= Ishikawa Station =

Ishikawa Station can refer to two railway stations in Aomori Prefecture, Japan:

- Ishikawa Station (JR East)
- Ishikawa Station (Kōnan Railway)

== See also ==
- In Aomori Prefecture
  - Ishikawa-Poolmae Station
- In Fukushima Prefecture
  - Iwaki-Ishikawa Station
- In Kanagawa Prefecture
  - Ishikawachō Station
- In Tokyo
  - Ishikawadai Station
