= Seiaichūkōmae Station =

Railway station in Hirosaki, Aomori Prefecture, Japan

Seiaichūkōmae Station 聖愛中高前駅
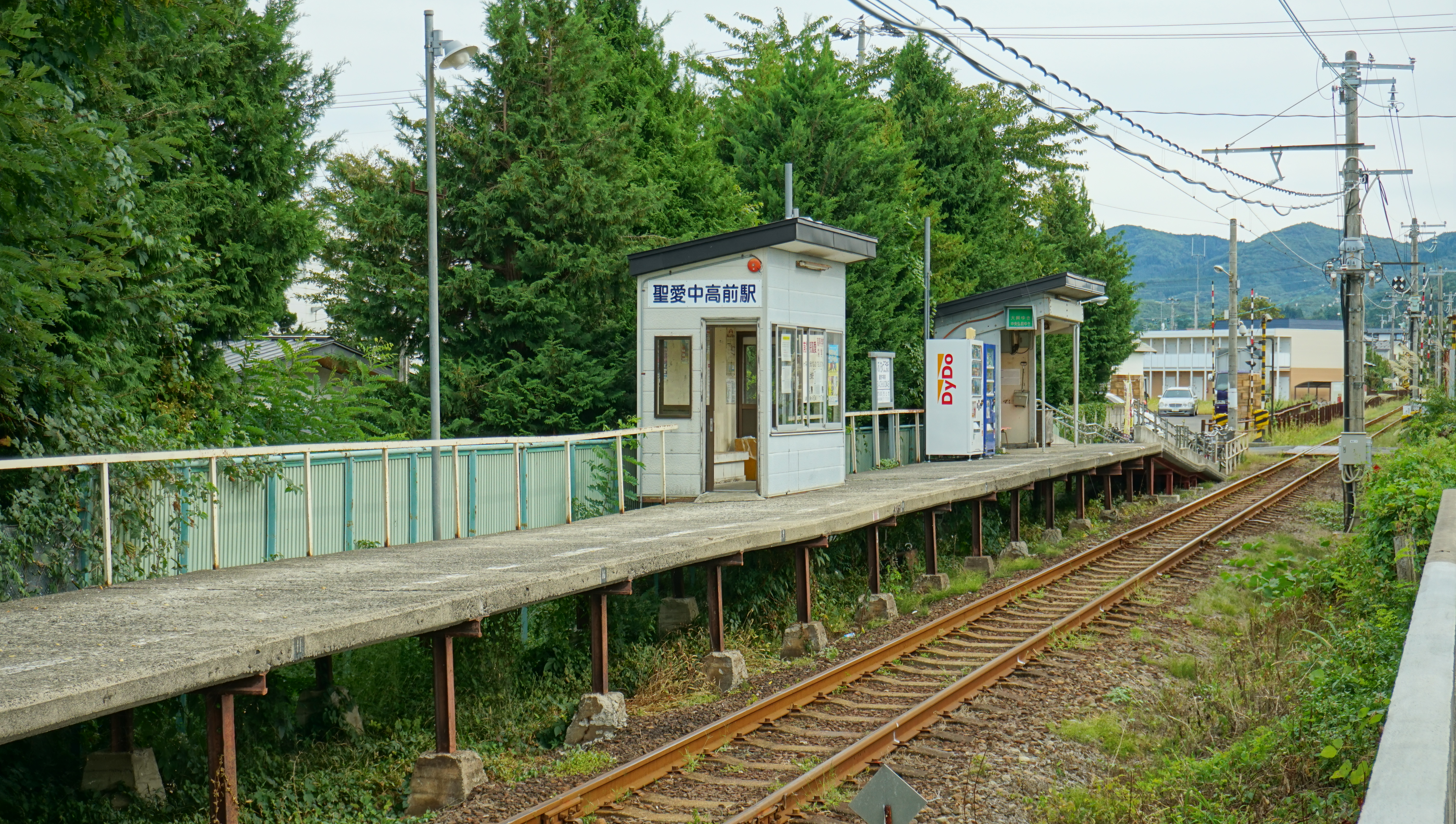
- Seiaichūkōmae Station, September 2019

General information
- Location: Nakano 3-5-11, Hirosaki-shi, Aomori-ken 036-8155; Japan
- Coordinates: 40°34′37.29″N 140°28′21.87″E
- Operator: Kōnan Railway
- Line: ■ Ōwani Line
- Distance: 11.3 km from Ōwani
- Platforms: 1 side platform

Other information
- Status: Unstaffed
- Website: Official website (in Japanese)

History
- Opened: January 26, 1952
- Former names: Jōnan (to 2008)

Passengers
- FY2015: 176
Location
- Location within Aomori Prefecture Location within Japan

Seiaichūkōmae Station (聖愛中高前駅, Seiaichūkōmae-eki) is a railway station in the city of Hirosaki, Aomori Prefecture, Japan, operated by the private railway operator, Kōnan Railway Company

== Lines ==
Seiaichūkōmae Station is served by the Kōnan Railway Ōwani Line, and lies 11.3 kilometers from the southern terminus of the line at Ōwani Station.

== Station layout ==
The station has one side platform serving a single bi-directional track. There is no station building, but only a weather shelter on the platform. The station is unattended.

== Adjacent stations ==
«	Service	»
Kōnan Railway Kōnan Line
Chitose	-	Hirosaki Gakuindai-mae

== History ==
Seiaichūkōmae Station was opened as Jōnan Station (城南駅, Jōnan-eki) on January 26, 1952, with the opening of the Ōwani Line. The station name was changed to its present name on September 1, 2008. The station has been unattended since April 1, 2009.

== Surrounding area ==
- Aomori Prefectural Hirosaki Vocational High School
- Seiai High School
- Seiai Middle School

== See also ==
- List of railway stations in Japan
