= Matsukitai Station =

Railway station in Hirosaki, Aomori Prefecture, Japan

Matsukitai Station 松木平駅
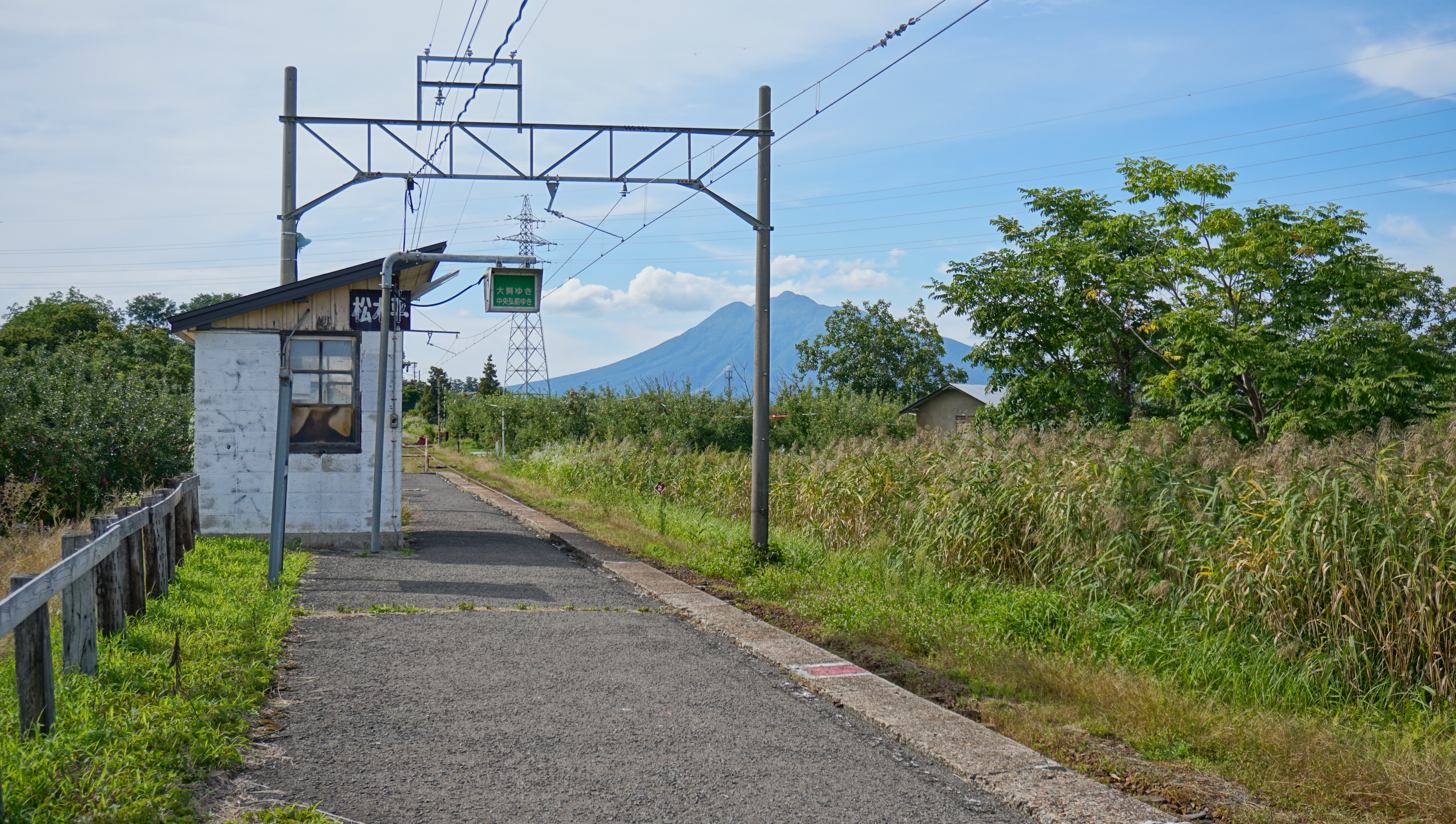
- Matsukitai Station in September 2019

General information
- Location: Osada-31-3 Koguriyama, Hirosaki-shi, Aomori-ken 036-8127; Japan
- Coordinates: 40°33′38.07″N 140°29′50.22″E
- Operator: Kōnan Railway
- Line: ■ Ōwani Line
- Distance: 8.4 km from Ōwani
- Platforms: 1 side platform

Other information
- Status: Unstaffed
- Website: Official website (in Japanese)

History
- Opened: January 26, 1952

Passengers
- FY2015: 26
Location
- Location within Aomori Prefecture Location within Japan

Matsukitai Station (松木平駅, Matsukitai-eki) is a railway station in the city of Hirosaki, Aomori Prefecture, Japan, operated by the private railway operator, Kōnan Railway Company

== Lines ==
Matsukitai Station is served by the Kōnan Railway Ōwani Line, and lies 8.4 kilometers from the southern terminus of the line at Ōwani Station.

== Station layout ==
The station has one side platform serving a single bi-directional track. There is no station building, but only a weather shelter on the platform. The station is unattended.

== Adjacent stations ==
«	Service	»
Kōnan Railway Kōnan Line
Tsugaru-Ōsawa	-	Koguriyama

== History ==
Matsukitai Station was opened on January 26, 1952, with the opening of the Ōwani Line.

== Surrounding area ==
- Shoeikai Matsuba Nursery

== See also ==
- List of railway stations in Japan
