= Shukugawara Station =

Shukugawara Station is the name of two train stations in Japan:

- Shukugawara Station (Aomori) (宿川原駅)
- Shukugawara Station (Kanagawa) (宿河原駅)
