= Tsugaru-Ōsawa Station =

Railway station in Hirosaki, Aomori Prefecture, Japan

Tsugaru-Ōsawa Station 津軽大沢駅
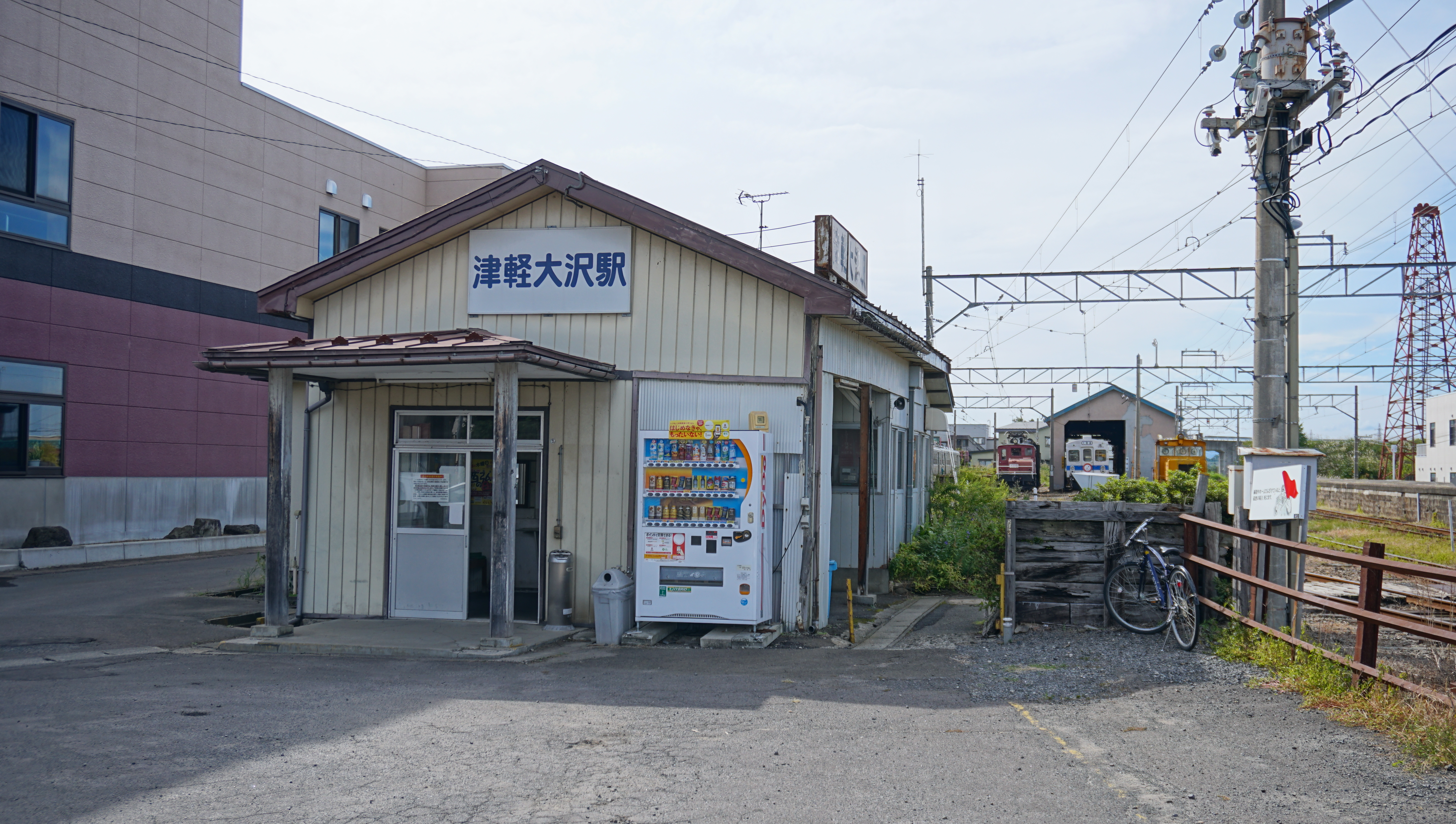
- Tsugaru-Ōsawa Station in September 2019

General information
- Location: Ōsawa Inamoto 1-1, Hirosaki-shi, Aomori-ken 036-8125; Japan
- Coordinates: 40°33′27.65″N 140°30′59.92″E
- Operator: Kōnan Railway
- Line: ■ Ōwani Line
- Distance: 6.7 km from Ōwani
- Platforms: 1 island platform

Other information
- Status: Staffed
- Website: Official website (in Japanese)

History
- Opened: January 26, 1952

Passengers
- FY2015: 116
Location
- Location within Aomori Prefecture Location within Japan

Tsugaru-Ōsawa Station (津軽大沢駅, Tsugaru-Ōsawa-eki) is a railway station in the city of Hirosaki, Aomori Prefecture, Japan, operated by the private railway operator, Kōnan Railway Company

== Lines ==
Gijukukōkōmae Station is served by the Kōnan Railway Ōwani Line, and lies 6.7 kilometers from the southern terminus of the line at Ōwani Station.

== Station layout ==
The station has a single island platform serving two tracks. The station building is staffed. The station also has a rail yard and maintenance and servicing facilities of the rolling stock of the Kōnan Railway, along with the electrical transformer station that provides power to the Ōwani Line.

=== Platforms ===
1	■ Kōnan Railway Ōwani Line	for Ōwani
2	■ Kōnan Railway Ōwani Line	forChūō-Hirosaki

== Adjacent stations ==
«	Service	»
Kōnan Railway Kōnan Line
Gijukukōkōmae	-	Matsukitai

== History ==
Tsugaru-Ōsawa Station was opened on January 26, 1952, with the opening of the Ōwani Line.

== Surrounding area ==
- Hakujuen Nursing Homeol

== See also ==
- List of railway stations in Japan
