= Ōwani Ikarigaseki Onsenkyō Prefectural Natural Park =

Natural park of Aomori prefecture, Japan

Coordinates: 40°24′33″N 140°38′39″E

- 大鰐碇ヶ関温泉郷県立自然公園
- Interactive map of Ōwani Ikarigaseki Onsenkyō Prefectural Natural Park
- Location: Aomori Prefecture, Japan
- Nearest city: Hirakawa/Ōwani
- Area: 67.30 km^{2} (25.98 sq mi)
- Established: 10 June 1953

Ōwani Ikarigaseki Onsenkyō Prefectural Natural Park (大鰐碇ヶ関温泉郷県立自然公園, Ōwani Ikarigaseki Onsenkyō kenritsu shizen-kōen) is a Prefectural Natural Park in southern Aomori Prefecture, Japan. Established in 1953, the park spans the borders of the municipalities of Hirakawa and Ōwani.

== See also ==
- National Parks of Japan
