= Hirokōshita Station =

Railway station in Hirosaki, Aomori Prefecture, Japan

Hirokōshita Station 弘高下駅
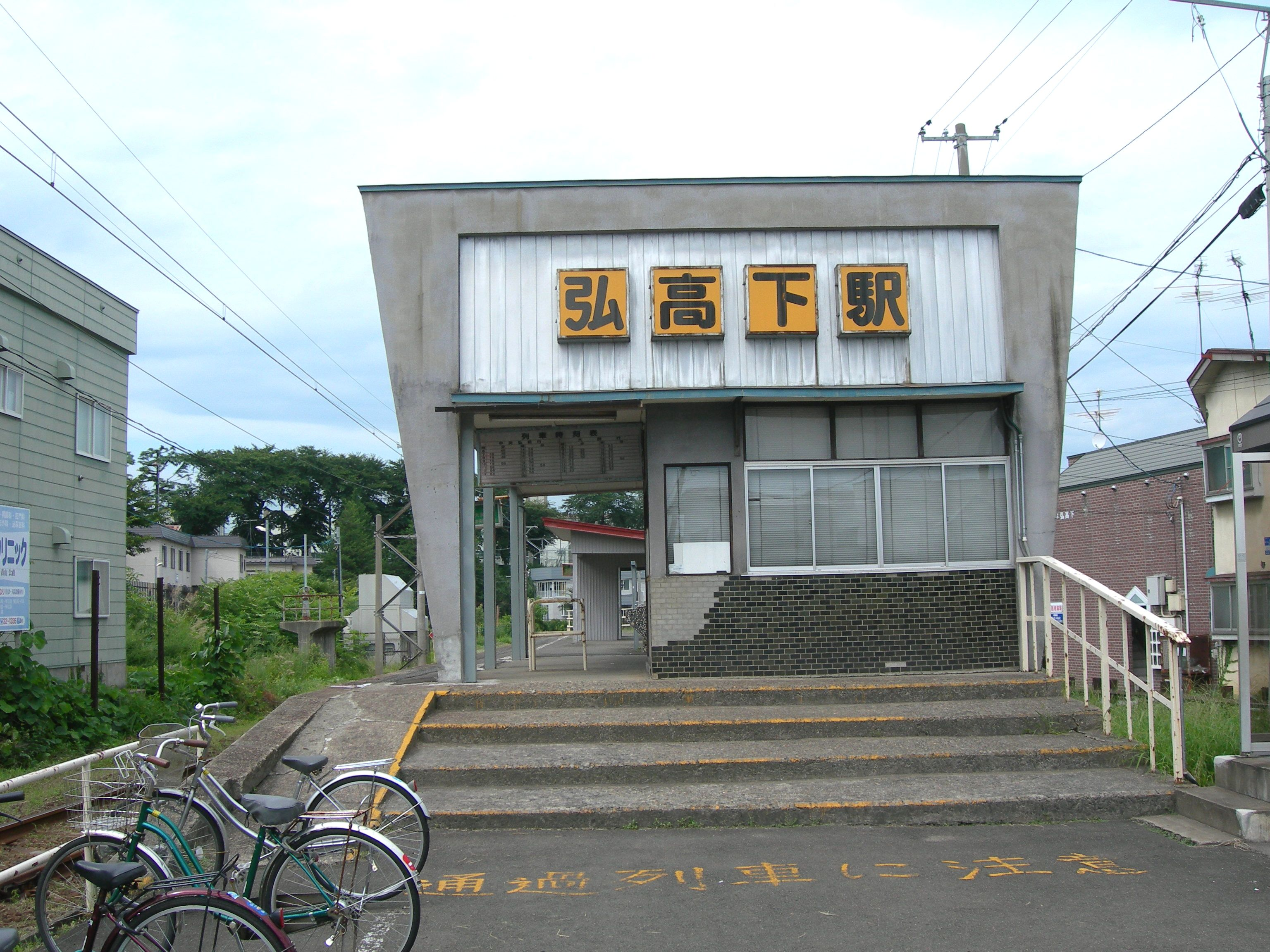
- Hirokōshita Station, August 2010

General information
- Location: Sakurabayashi-cho 9-7, Hirosaki-shi, Aomori-ken 036-8222; Japan
- Coordinates: 40°35′34.13″N 140°28′05.65″E
- Operator: Kōnan Railway
- Line: ■ Ōwani Line
- Distance: 13.1 km from Ōwani
- Platforms: 1 side platform

Other information
- Status: Unstaffed
- Website: Official website (in Japanese)

History
- Opened: January 26, 1952

Passengers
- FY2015: 85
Location
- Location within Aomori Prefecture Location within Japan

Hirokōshita Station (弘高下駅, Hirokōshita-eki) is a railway station in the city of Hirosaki, Aomori Prefecture, Japan, operated by the private railway operator, Kōnan Railway Company

== Lines ==
Hirokōshita Station is served by the Kōnan Railway Ōwani Line, and lies 13.1 kilometers from the southern terminus of the line at Ōwani Station.

== Station layout ==
The station has one side platform serving a single bi-directional track. There is no station building, but only a weather shelter on the platform. The station is unattended.

== Adjacent stations ==
«	Service	»
Kōnan Railway Kōnan Line
Hirosakigakuindaimae	-	Chūō-Hirosaki

== History ==
Hirokōshita Station was opened on January 26, 1952, with the opening of the Ōwani Line. Since August 5, 1974 it has been a kan'i itaku station.

== Surrounding area ==
- Hirosaki High School
- Hirosaki University

== See also ==
- List of railway stations in Japan
