= Gijukukōkōmae Station =

Railway station in Hirosaki, Aomori Prefecture, Japan

Gijukukōkōmae Station 義塾高校前駅
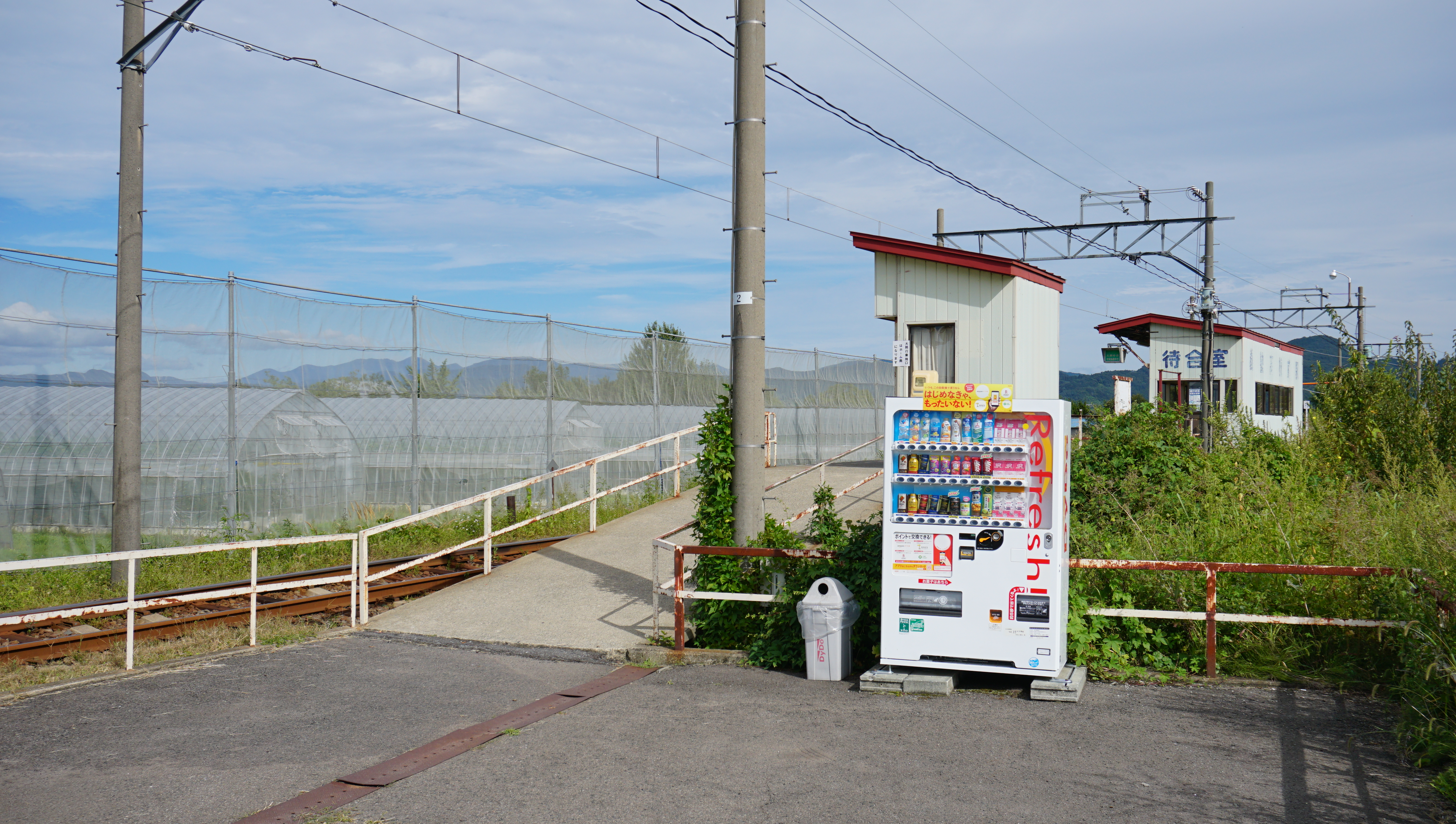
- Gijukukōkōmae Station in September 2019

General information
- Location: Nozaki-69-2 Ishikawa, Hirosaki-shi, Aomori-ken 036-8124; Japan
- Coordinates: 40°33′20.66″N 140°31′39.86″E
- Operator: Kōnan Railway
- Line: ■ Ōwani Line
- Distance: 5.7 km from Ōwani
- Platforms: 1 side platform

Other information
- Status: Unstaffed
- Website: Official website (in Japanese)

History
- Opened: November 1, 1987

Passengers
- FY2015: 156
Location
- Location within Aomori Prefecture Location within Japan

Gijukukōkōmae Station (義塾高校前駅, Gijukukōkōmae-eki) is a railway station in the city of Hirosaki, Aomori Prefecture, Japan, operated by the private railway operator, Kōnan Railway Company

== Lines ==
Gijukukōkōmae Station is served by the Kōnan Railway Ōwani Line, and lies 5.7 kilometers from the southern terminus of the line at Ōwani Station.

== Station layout ==
The station has one side platform serving a single bi-directional track. There is no station building, but only a weather shelter on the platform. The station is unattended.

== Adjacent stations ==
«	Service	»
Kōnan Railway Kōnan Line
Ishikawa	-	Tsugaru-Ōsawa

== History ==
Gijukukōkōmae Station was opened on November 1, 1987.

== Surrounding area ==
Toou Technical High School

== See also ==
- List of railway stations in Japan
