= Chitose Station =

Chitose Station is the name of three train stations in Japan:

- Chitose Station (Aomori) (千年駅)
- Chitose Station (Chiba) (千歳駅)
- Chitose Station (Hokkaido) (千歳駅)
