= Hirosakigakuindaimae Station =

Railway station in Hirosaki, Aomori Prefecture, Japan

Hirosakigakuindaimae Station 弘前学院大前駅
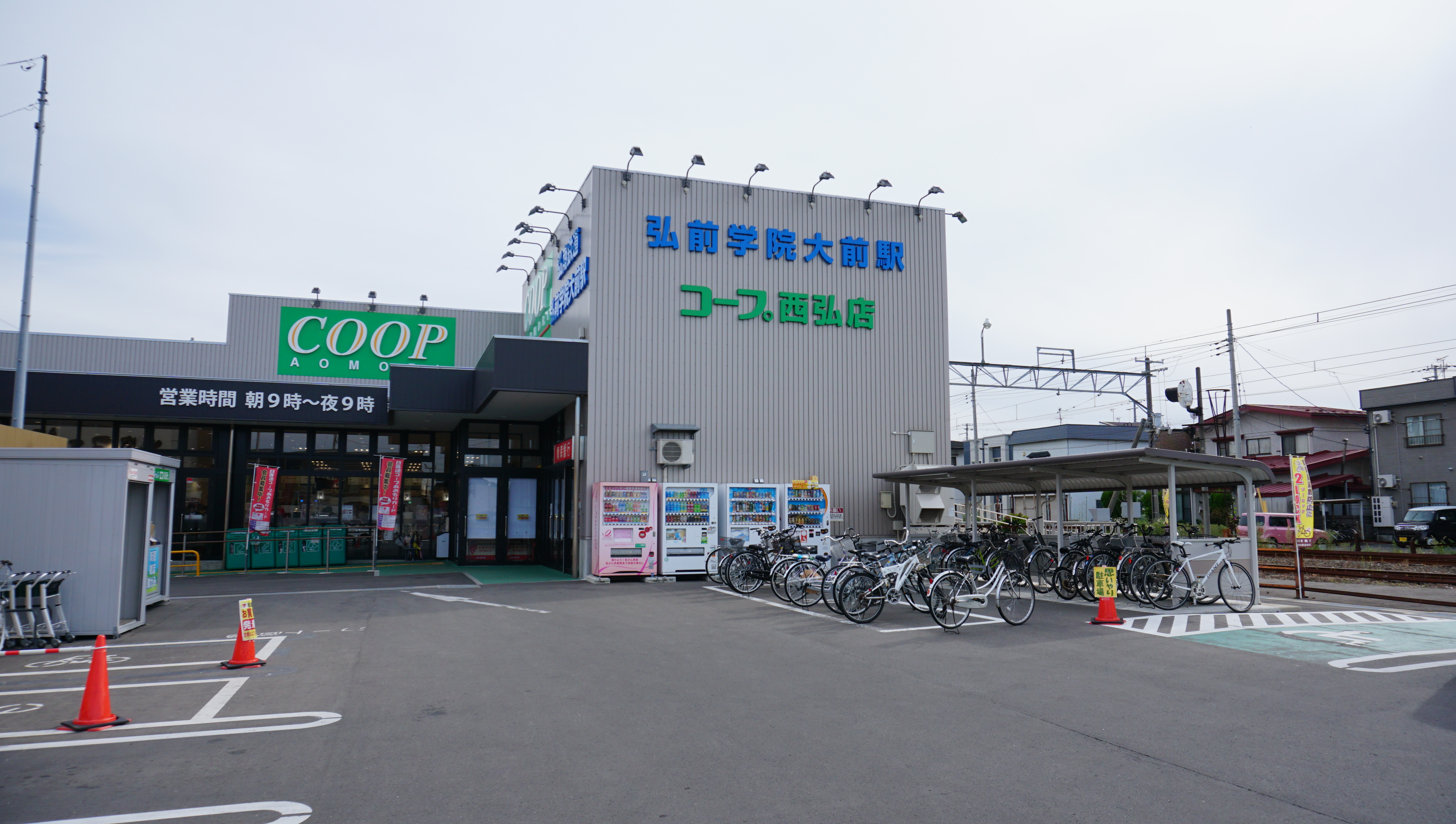
- Hirosakigakuindaimae Station

General information
- Location: Nakano 1-13-1, Hirosaki-shi, Aomori-ken 036-1451; Japan
- Coordinates: 40°35′01.69″N 140°28′14.30″E
- Operator: Kōnan Railway
- Line: ■ Ōwani Line
- Distance: 12.0 km from Ōwani
- Platforms: 1 island platform

Other information
- Status: Unstaffed
- Website: Official website (in Japanese)

History
- Opened: January 26, 1952
- Former names: Nishi-Hirosaki (to 1986)

Passengers
- FY2015: 327
Location
- Location within Aomori Prefecture Location within Japan

Hirosakigakuindaimae Station (弘前学院大前駅, Hirosakigakuindaimae-eki) is a railway station in the city of Hirosaki, Aomori Prefecture, Japan, operated by the private railway operator, Kōnan Railway Company. It is located in front of Hirosaki Gakuin University.

== Lines ==
Hirosakigakuindaimae Station is served by the Kōnan Railway Ōwani Line, and lies 12.0 kilometers from the southern terminus of the line at Ōwani Station.

== Station layout ==
The station has one island platform connected to the station building by a level crossing. The station is unattended.

=== Platforms ===
1	■ Kōnan Railway Ōwani Line	for Chūō-Hirosaki
2	■ Kōnan Railway Ōwani Line	for Ōwani

== Adjacent stations ==
«	Service	»
Kōnan Railway Kōnan Line
Seiaichūkōmae	-	Hirokōshita

== History ==
Hirosakigakuindaimai Station was opened as Nishi-Hirosaki Station (西弘前, Nishi-Hirosaki-eki) on January 26, 1952, with the opening of the Ōwani Line. On December 1, 1971 the first automatic ticket machines on the Kōnan Railway were installed at this station. It became a kan'i itaku station on October 1, 1985. The station name was changed to its present name on September 1, 2008. The station has been unattended since April 1, 2009.

== Surrounding area ==
- Hirosaki University
- Hirosaki Gakuin University
- Tohoku Women's College

== See also ==
- List of railway stations in Japan
