= Sabaishi Station =

Railway station in Ōwani, Akita Prefecture, Japan

Sabaishi Station 鯖石駅
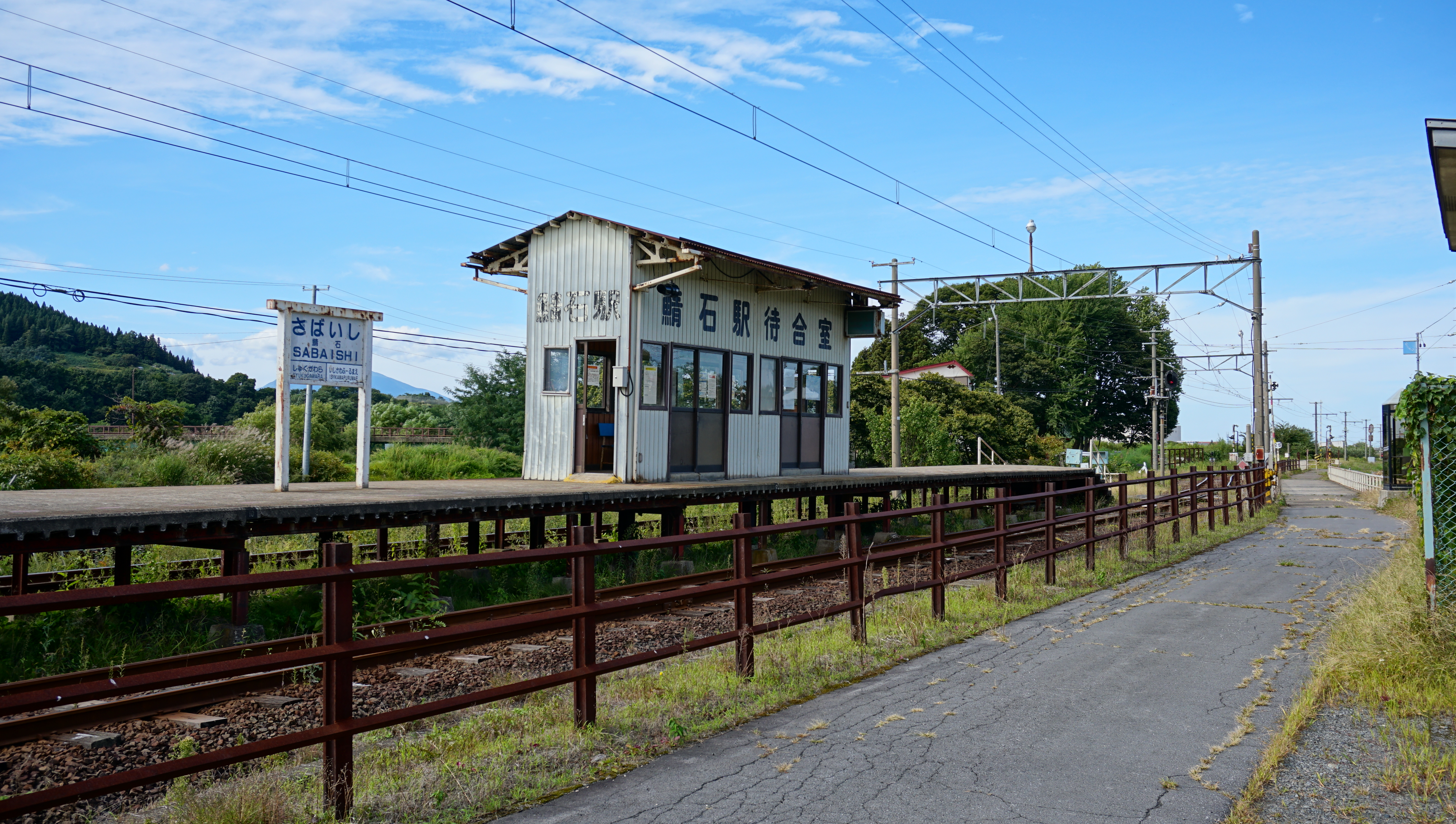
- Sabaishi Station in September 2019

General information
- Location: Sakuranoki Sabaishi, Ōwani-machi, Minamitsugaru-gun, Aomori-ken 038-0241; Japan
- Coordinates: 40°32′8.48″N 140°33′9.89″E
- Operator: Kōnan Railway
- Line: ■ Ōwani Line
- Distance: 2.2 km from Ōwani
- Platforms: 1 island platform

Other information
- Status: Unstaffed
- Website: Official website (in Japanese)

History
- Opened: January 26, 1952

Passengers
- FY2015: 111
Location
- Location within Aomori Prefecture Location within Japan

Sabaishi Station (鯖石駅, Sabaishi-eki) is a railway station in the town of Ōwani, Aomori Prefecture, Japan, operated by the private railway operator, Kōnan Railway Company.

== Lines ==
Sabaishi Station is served by the Kōnan Railway Ōwani Line, and lies 2.2 kilometers from the southern terminus of the line at Ōwani Station.

== Station layout ==
The station has one island platform. There is no station building, but only a weather shelter on the platform. The station is unattended.

=== Platforms ===
1	■ Kōnan Railway Ōwani Line	for Ōwani
2	■ Kōnan Railway Ōwani Line	for Chūō-Hirosaki

== Adjacent stations ==
«	Service	»
Kōnan Railway Kōnan Line
Shukugawara	-	Ishikawa Pool

== History ==
Sabaishi Station was opened on January 26, 1952 with the opening of the Kōnan Railway.

== Surrounding area ==
- Hirakawa River

== See also ==
- List of railway stations in Japan
