= Hirosaki University of Health and Welfare =

Private university in Hirosaki, Aomori Prefecture, Japan

Coordinates: 40°35′22″N 140°30′02″E

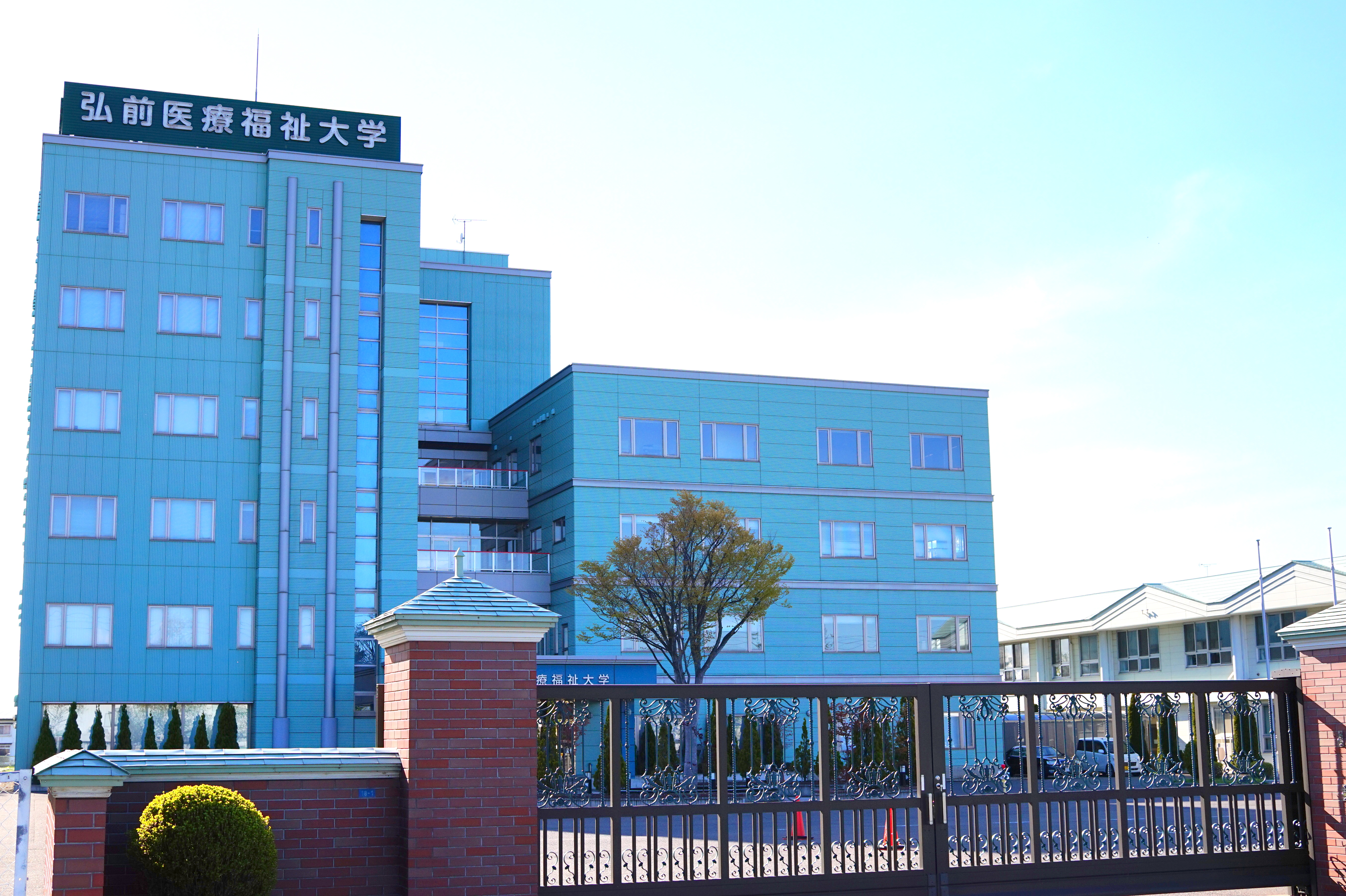
- 弘前医療福祉大学
- Type: Private
- Established: 2009
- Location: Hirosaki, Aomori, Japan
- Website: Official website

Hirosaki University of Health and Welfare (弘前医療福祉大学, Hirosaki iryō fukushi daigaku) is a private university in Hirosaki, Aomori Prefecture, Japan, established in 2009. The school operates as both a four-year and as a two-year junior college, specializing in nursing and medical social welfare.
