= Kōnan Railway Ōwani Line =

Railway line in Japan

Kōnan Railway Ōwani Line (大鰐線)
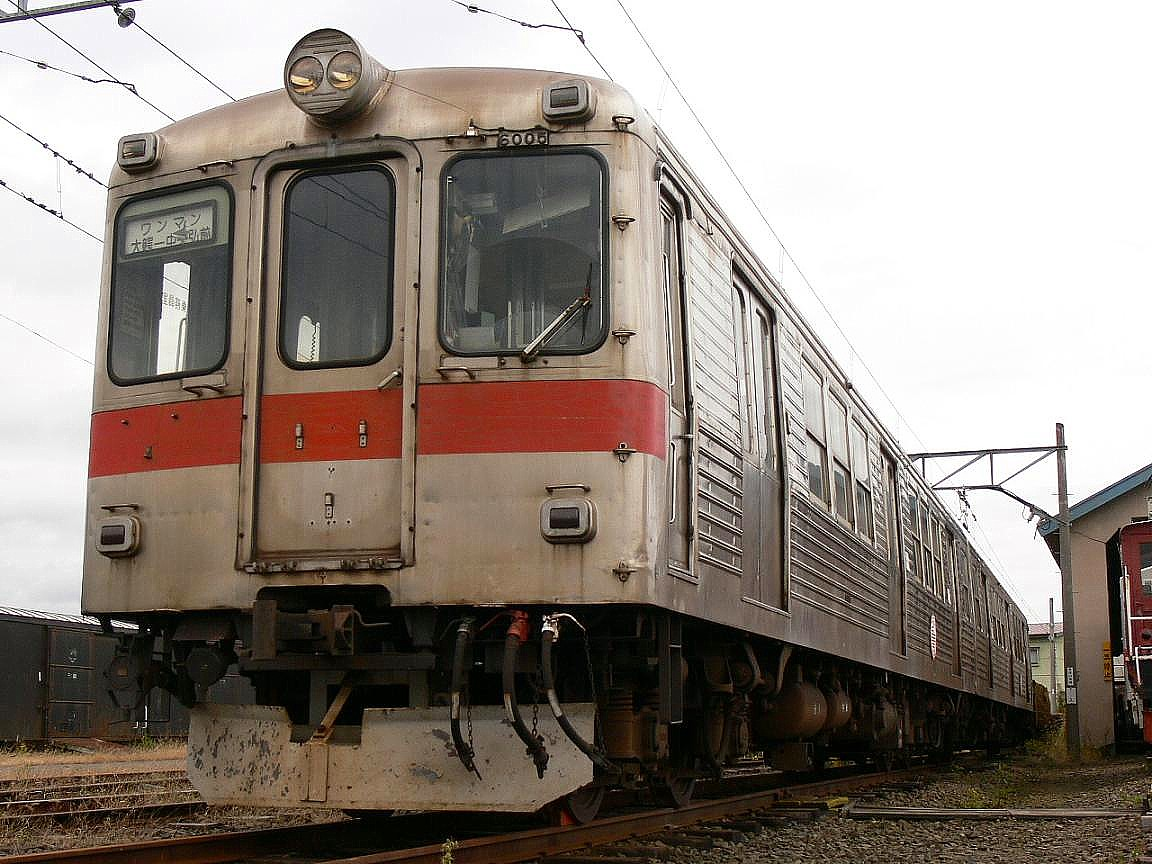
- Konan 6000 Series EMU at Ōwani Station

Overview
- Owner: Kōnan Railway Company
- Termini: Ōwani; Chūō-Hirosaki
- Stations: 14

Service
- Type: Heavy rail Passenger

History
- Opened: 1952

Technical
- Line length: 13.9 km (8.6 mi)
- Track gauge: 1,067 mm (3 ft 6 in)
- Electrification: 1,500 V DC with Overhead catenary

The Ōwani Line (大鰐線, Ōwani-sen) is a railway route operated by the Japanese private railway Kōnan Railway (弘南鉄道, Kōnan Tetsudō) in Aomori Prefecture, from Chūō-Hirosaki Station in Hirosaki to Ōwani Station in Ōwani.

== History ==
On July 25, 1949, the Hirosaki Electric Railway (弘前電気鉄道株式会社, Hirosaki Denki-Tetsudō Kabushika-kaisha) was established, and connected Ōwani Station with Chuo-Hirosaki Station by January 26, 1952. The company was founded by a combination of capital from the Hirosaki city government, and Mitsubishi Electric, with the line intended by Mitsubishi to be a test platform for future local train systems. On October 1, 1970, the Hirosaki Electric Railway was acquired by the Kōnan Railway Company, and its line became the Kōnan Railway Ōwani Line. At the same time all freight operations were suspended. A new automatic block signal system became operational from November 1, 2003. Express services were suspended from November 2006.

Station numbering was introduced on the Ōwani Line on October 5, 2020.

== Future closure ==
Due to a large decline in ridership, and chronic deficits, the Kōnan Railway Company announced intent to close the line in 2013. A council was established by passing municipalities to keep the line open shortly after, which dissolved in 2020. The company received funding to continue operating the line from passing municipalities in 2021. Suspension of the line was announced in November 2024. Operation on the line is planned to be indefinitely suspended from April 1, 2028.

== Station list ==
No.	Station	Japanese	Distance (km)		Transfers	Location
No.	Station	Japanese	Between Stations	Total	Transfers	Location
KW01	Ōwani	大鰐駅	-	0.0	JR East: ■ Ōu Main Line	Minamitsugaru District; Ōwani, Aomori Prefecture
KW02	Shukugawara	宿川原駅	0.7	0.7		Minamitsugaru District; Ōwani, Aomori Prefecture
KW03	Sabaishi	鯖石駅	1.5	2.5		Minamitsugaru District; Ōwani, Aomori Prefecture
KW04	Ishikawa Pool	石川プール前駅	0.8	3.0		Hirosaki, Aomori Prefecture
KW05	Ishikawa	石川駅	1.4	4.4		Hirosaki, Aomori Prefecture
KW06	Gijukukōkōmae	義塾高校前駅	1.3	5.7		Hirosaki, Aomori Prefecture
KW07	Tsugaru-Ōsawa	津軽大沢駅	1.0	6.7		Hirosaki, Aomori Prefecture
KW08	Matsukitai	松木平駅	1.7	8.4		Hirosaki, Aomori Prefecture
KW09	Koguriyama	小栗山駅	0.9	9.3		Hirosaki, Aomori Prefecture
KW10	Chitose	千年駅	0.7	10.0		Hirosaki, Aomori Prefecture
KW11	Seiaichūkō-mae	聖愛中高前駅	1.3	11.3		Hirosaki, Aomori Prefecture
KW12	Hirosaki Gakuindai-mae	弘前学院大前駅	0.7	12.0		Hirosaki, Aomori Prefecture
KW13	Hirokōshita	弘高下駅	1.1	13.1		Hirosaki, Aomori Prefecture
KW14	Chūō-Hirosaki	中央弘前駅	0.8	13.9		Hirosaki, Aomori Prefecture

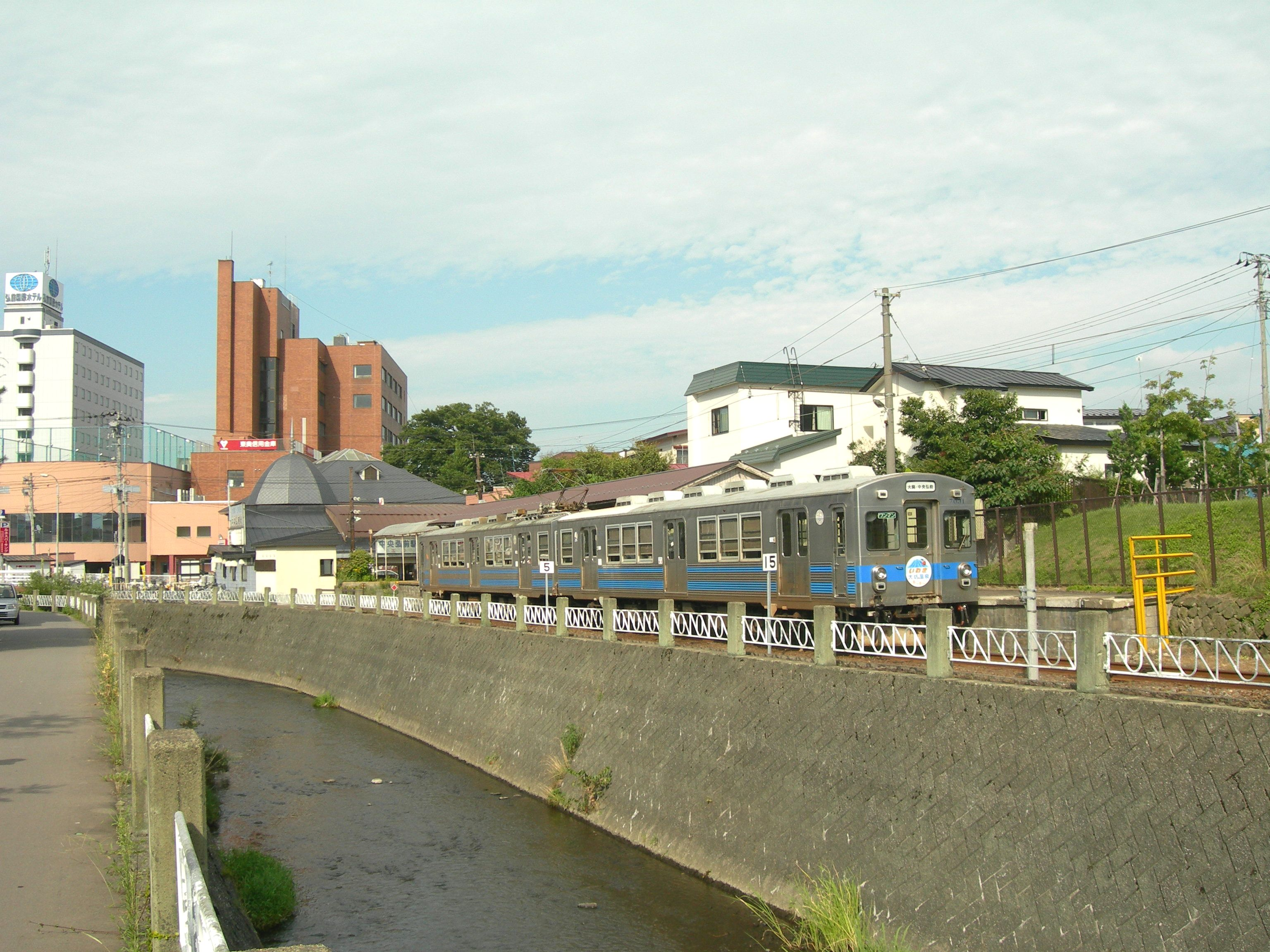
Train at north terminus of line (2010)

== Line Data ==
- Length: 13.9 km (8.6 mi)
- Number of stations: 14 (including termini)
- Tracks: single track
- Block Signal: Automatic Block Signal
