= Shibata Gakuen University =

College in Hirosaki, Japan

Coordinates: 40°35′22″N 140°28′42″E

- 柴田学園大学; Shibata Gakuen daigaku
- Type: Private
- Established: 1923
- Location: Hirosaki, Aomori, Japan
- Website: Official website

Shibata Gakuen University (柴田学園大学, Shibata Gakuen daigaku) is a private women's college in the city of Hirosaki, Aomori Prefecture, Japan, established in 1969. The predecessor of the school was founded in 1923.
