= Hirosaki =

City in Tōhoku, Aomori, Japan

Hirosaki 弘前市
- City
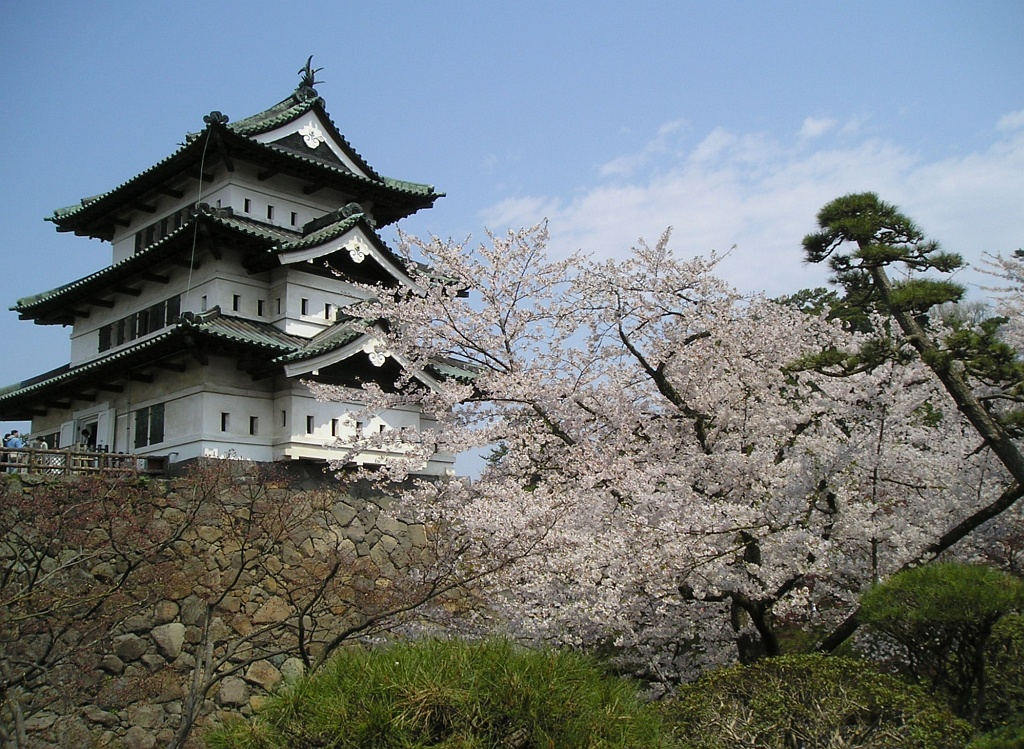
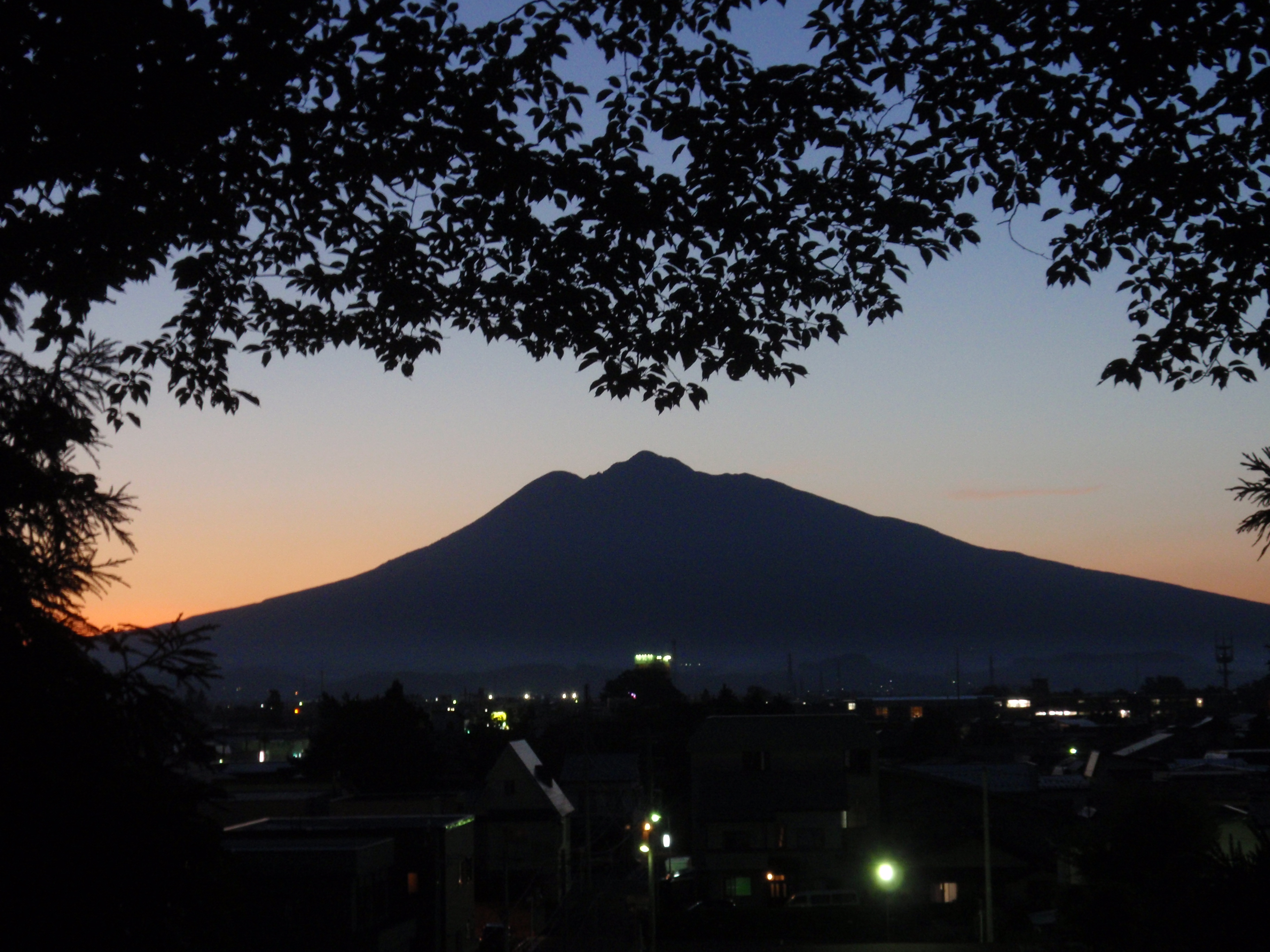
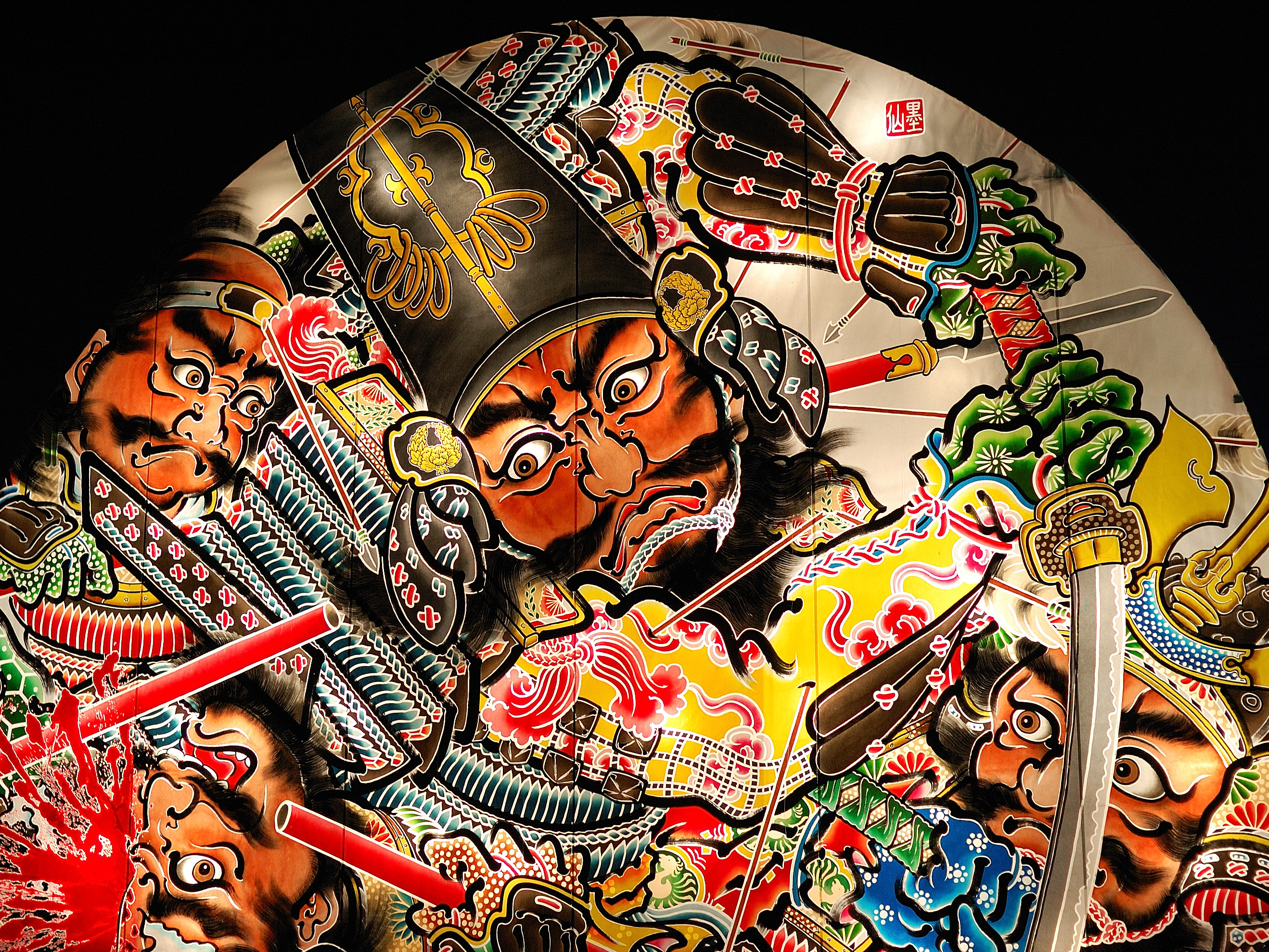
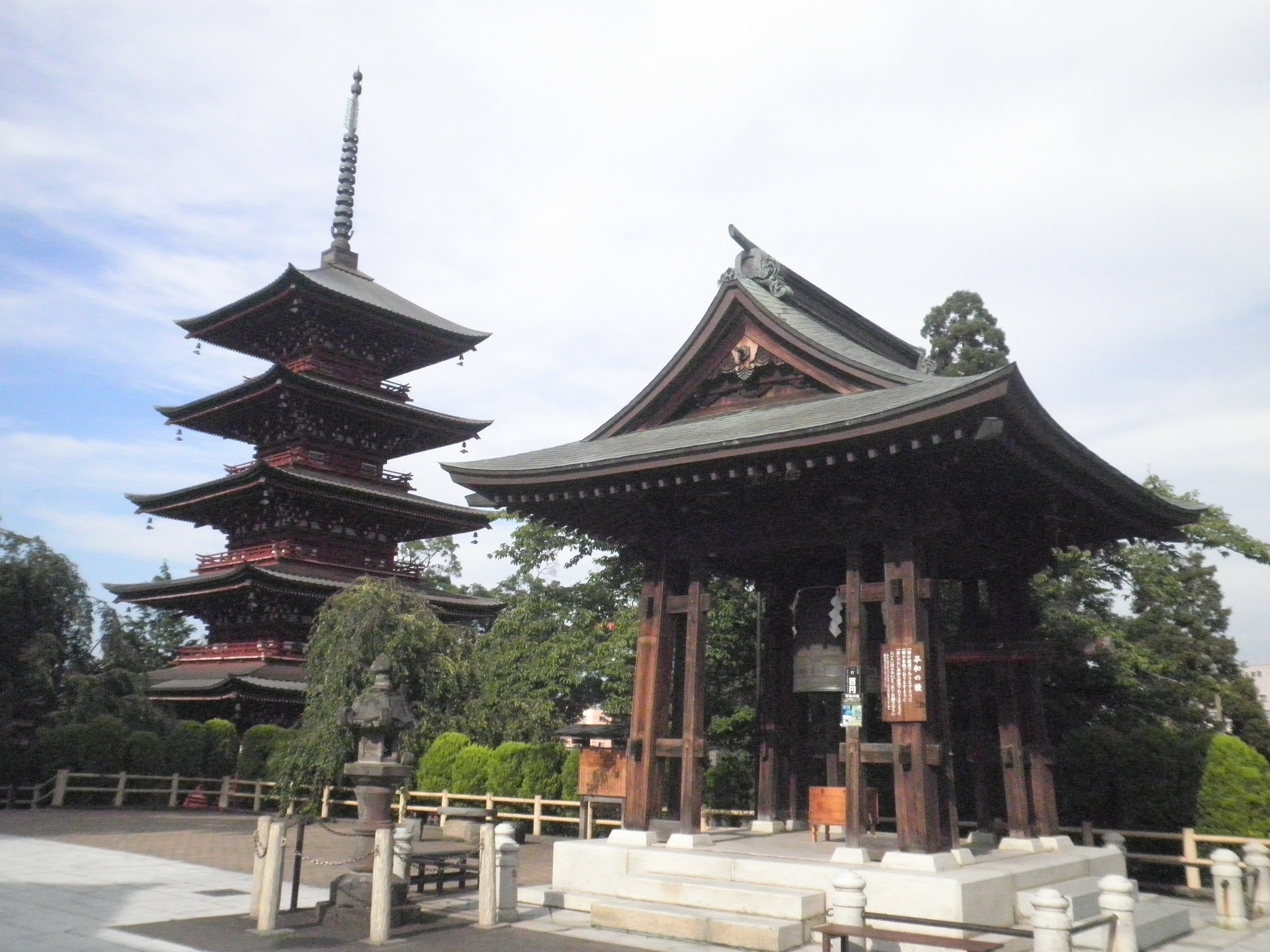
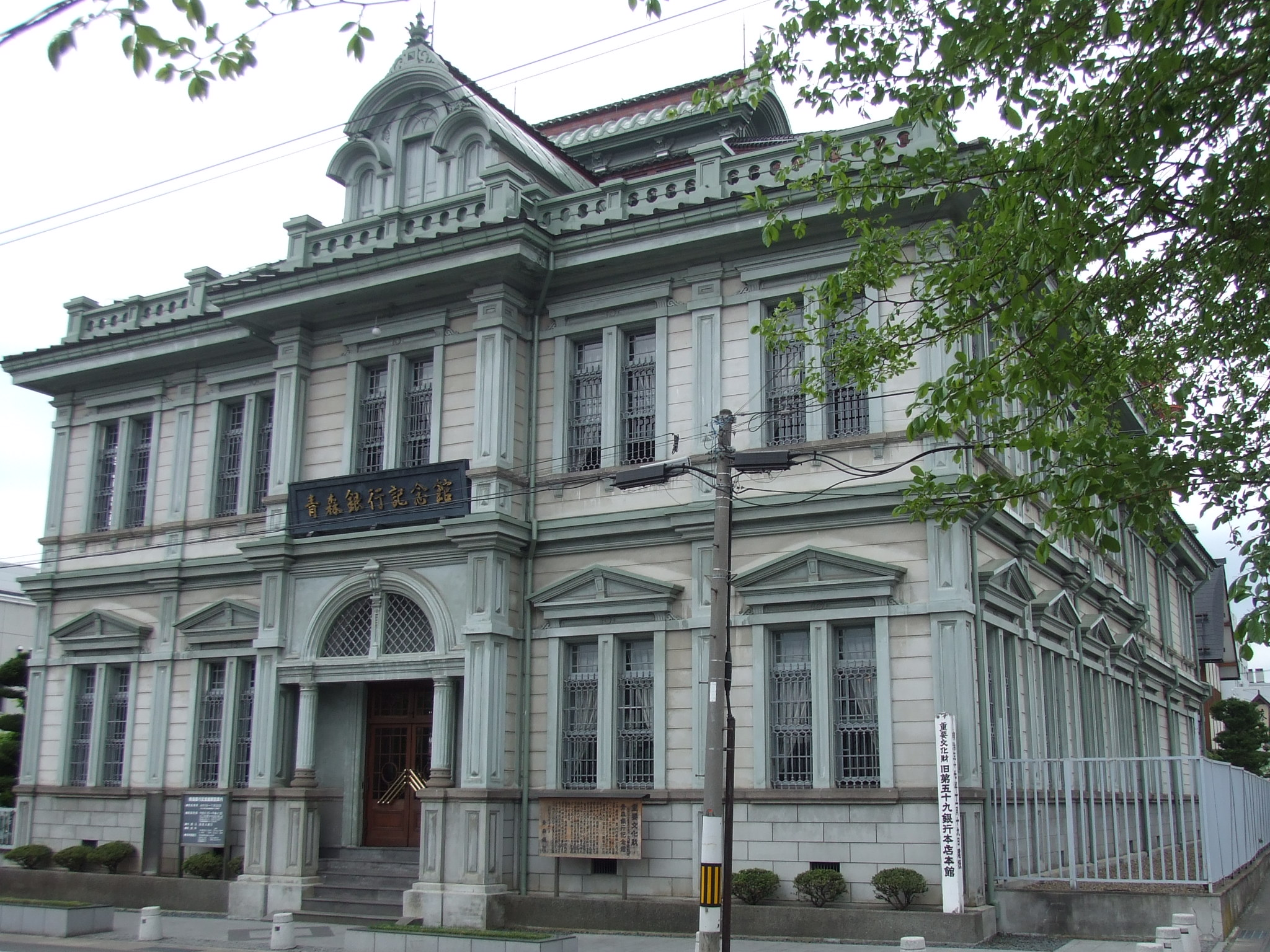
- Hirosaki Castle and Sakura
Mount Iwaki	Hirosaki Neputa Festival
Saisho-in temple	former 59 Bank HQ
- Flag Seal
- Location of Hirosaki in Aomori Prefecture

- Coordinates: 40°36′11″N 140°27′50″E
- Country: Japan
- Region: Tōhoku
- Prefecture: Aomori
- First official recorded: 1611 AD
- City Settled: April 1, 1889

Government
  - Mayor: Masato Tanikawa (谷川政人) - from April 2026

Area
  - Total: 524.20 km^{2} (202.39 sq mi)

Population (January 1, 2026)
  - Total: 157,031
  - Density: 299.56/km^{2} (775.86/sq mi)
- Time zone: UTC+9 (Japan Standard Time)
- Phone number: 0172-35-1111
- Address: 1-1 Kamishirogane-machi, Hirosaki-shi, Aomori-ken 036-8551
- Climate: Cfa/Dfa
- Website: Official website
- Symbols
- Flower: Cherry blossom
- Tree: Apple tree

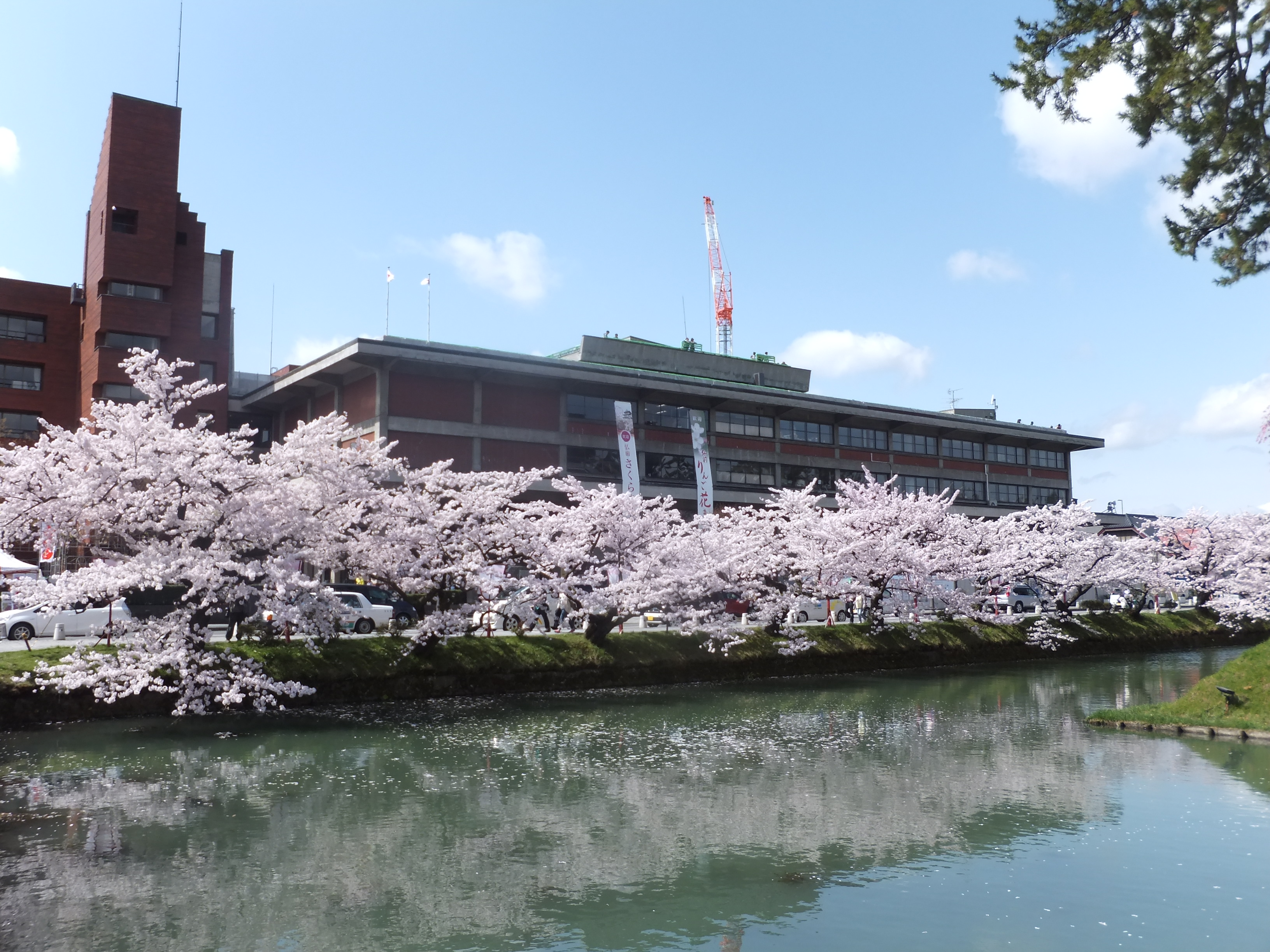
Hirosaki City Hall

Hirosaki (弘前市, Hirosaki-shi) is a city located in western Aomori Prefecture, Japan. As of 1 January 2026, the city had an estimated population of 157,031 in 84,998 households, and a population density of 300 per square kilometre (780/sq mi). The total area of the city is 524.20 square kilometers (202.39 sq mi).

Hirosaki developed as a castle town for the 100,000 koku Hirosaki Domain ruled by the Tsugaru clan. The city is currently a regional commercial center, and the largest producer of apples in Japan. The city government has been promoting the slogans "Apple Colored Town Hirosaki" and "Castle and Cherry Blossom and Apple Town" to promote the city image. The town is also noted for many western-style buildings dating from the Meiji period.

== Geography ==
Hirosaki is located in western Aomori Prefecture, at the southern end of the Tsugaru plains of the Tsugaru Peninsula, southeast of Mount Iwaki and bordering on Akita Prefecture. The eastern and southern flanks of Mount Iwaki and its peak are within the city's borders. The Iwaki River flows from the west to the northeast through the city.

=== Neighboring municipalities ===
Akita Prefecture

- Ōdate

Aomori Prefecture

- Ajigasawa
- Fujisaki
- Hirakawa
- Inakadate
- Itayanagi
- Nishimeya
- Ōwani
- Tsugaru
- Tsuruta

== Climate ==
Hirosaki has a humid continental climate (Köppen Dfa) characterized by hot summers and cold winters with heavy snowfall. The average annual temperature in Hirosaki is 10.5 °C. The average annual rainfall is 1357 mm with August as the wettest month and April as the driest. The temperatures are highest on average in August, at around 23.5 °C, and lowest in January, at around -1.5 °C.

Climate data for Hirosaki (elevation 30 m, 1991–2020 normals, extremes 1976–present)
Month	Jan	Feb	Mar	Apr	May	Jun	Jul	Aug	Sep	Oct	Nov	Dec	Year
Record high °C (°F)	12.5 (54.5)	17.8 (64.0)	23.8 (74.8)	28.0 (82.4)	33.3 (91.9)	33.7 (92.7)	36.4 (97.5)	39.3 (102.7)	36.7 (98.1)	28.7 (83.7)	24.2 (75.6)	18.0 (64.4)	39.3 (102.7)
Mean daily maximum °C (°F)	1.7 (35.1)	2.5 (36.5)	6.7 (44.1)	14.3 (57.7)	20.3 (68.5)	23.9 (75.0)	27.4 (81.3)	28.8 (83.8)	24.9 (76.8)	18.4 (65.1)	11.3 (52.3)	4.4 (39.9)	15.4 (59.7)
Daily mean °C (°F)	−1.5 (29.3)	−1.0 (30.2)	2.3 (36.1)	8.6 (47.5)	14.3 (57.7)	18.3 (64.9)	22.3 (72.1)	23.5 (74.3)	19.4 (66.9)	12.9 (55.2)	6.5 (43.7)	0.8 (33.4)	10.6 (51.1)
Mean daily minimum °C (°F)	−4.6 (23.7)	−4.6 (23.7)	−1.8 (28.8)	3.2 (37.8)	8.9 (48.0)	13.7 (56.7)	18.2 (64.8)	19.3 (66.7)	14.9 (58.8)	8.2 (46.8)	2.2 (36.0)	−2.4 (27.7)	6.3 (43.3)
Record low °C (°F)	−13.5 (7.7)	−16.2 (2.8)	−10.4 (13.3)	−5.9 (21.4)	−1.1 (30.0)	4.2 (39.6)	6.8 (44.2)	11.0 (51.8)	6.0 (42.8)	−0.4 (31.3)	−6.8 (19.8)	−11.6 (11.1)	−16.2 (2.8)
Average precipitation mm (inches)	125.5 (4.94)	99.9 (3.93)	82.3 (3.24)	65.8 (2.59)	66.3 (2.61)	71.9 (2.83)	115.3 (4.54)	140.7 (5.54)	136.3 (5.37)	107.7 (4.24)	113.7 (4.48)	130.1 (5.12)	1,255.3 (49.42)
Average snowfall cm (inches)	221 (87)	185 (73)	116 (46)	6 (2.4)	0 (0)	0 (0)	0 (0)	0 (0)	0 (0)	0 (0)	17 (6.7)	147 (58)	679 (267)
Average precipitation days (≥ 1.0 mm)	20.3	18.0	15.2	11.2	9.3	8.3	9.5	10.4	10.7	12.9	16.2	20.1	161.8
Mean monthly sunshine hours	44.3	65.7	119.5	182.9	204.4	182.3	159.3	184.5	158.3	140.8	90.0	52.9	1,585.1
Source: Japan Meteorological Agency (1991–2020 normals, extremes 1976–present)

== Demographics ==
Per Japanese census data, the population of Hirosaki peaked at around the year 2000 and has declined since then.

Historical population
Year	Pop.	±% p.a.
1960	170,919	—
1970	174,644	+0.22%
1980	192,291	+0.97%
1990	191,217	−0.06%
2000	193,297	+0.11%
2010	183,473	−0.52%
2020	168,466	−0.85%

== City emblem ==
Hirosaki uses a Buddhist manji as its official emblem. This came from the flag emblem of Tsugaru clan, the daimyō of Hirosaki Domain during the Edo period.

== History ==
Many human-shaped clay figures have been unearthed around the region which date as far back as 12,000 years. More of these figures date from the Jomon and Yayoi period.

The area around Hirosaki formed part of the domains of the Northern Fujiwara in the Heian period; Minamoto no Yoritomo awarded it to the Nanbu clan in the early Kamakura period after the defeat of the Northern Fujiwara (1189). During the Sengoku period a local retainer of the Nambu, Ōura Tamenobu, declared his independence (1571) and seized local castles. He pledged fealty to Toyotomi Hideyoshi at the Battle of Odawara in 1590, and was confirmed in his holdings with revenues of 45,000 koku. He also changed his name to "Tsugaru". After siding with Tokugawa Ieyasu at the Battle of Sekigahara, he was re-confirmed in his holdings with a nominal kokudaka of 47,000 koku and he began construction of a castle in Takaoka (present-day Hirosaki). This marked the start of Hirosaki Domain under the Tokugawa shogunate. His successor, Tsugaru Nobuhira, completed the castle in 1611, but its massive 5-story tenshu was lost to lightning in 1627. The domain's kokudaka increased to 100,000 koku in 1628.

The Tsugaru clan sided with the Satchō Alliance in the Boshin War of the Meiji Restoration, and was rewarded by the new Meiji government with an additional 10,000 koku. However, with the abolition of the han system on August 29, 1871, Hirosaki Domain was abolished, and replaced by Hirosaki Prefecture. The prefecture was renamed Aomori Prefecture in October of the same year, and the prefectural capital was relocated to the more centrally located Aomori.

Chōyō Elementary School was established on October 1, 1873. Apple horticulture was introduced to Hirosaki from 1877 and the 59th National Bank, the predecessor of Aomori Bank opened in March 1878. Hirosaki was proclaimed a city on April 1, 1889 with the establishment of the modern municipalities system and was thus one of the first 30 cities in Japan. It was also the third largest city in the Tōhoku region after Sendai and Morioka at the time. The Ōu Main Line connected Hirosaki with Aomori on December 1, 1894.

Hirosaki became the home garrison town for the Imperial Japanese Army's IJA 8th Division from October, 1898. The division was prominently active in the Russo-Japanese War.

Hirosaki City Hospital was established in 1901, and Hirosaki City Library in 1906. The first telephone service in the city started in 1909. The first Cherry Blossom Festival was held in 1918. In 1927, the Kōnan Railway connected Hirosaki with Onoe. Hirosaki University was established in 1949.

On March 1, 1955, Hirosaki expanded through annexation of neighboring villages of Shimizu, Wattoku, Toyoda, Horikoshi, Chitose, Fujishiro, Niina, Funazawa, Takasugi, Susono and Higashimeya. Nishimeya became an enclave. The city further expanded on September 1, 1957, through annexation of neighboring Ishikawa Village.

In 1979, the city was connected to the Tōhoku Expressway by a spur road named "Apple Road".

On February 27, 2006, old Hirosaki city, the town of Iwaki, and the village of Sōma were merged into an expanded city of Hirosaki.

In 2012, the city began partnering with the French commune of Beuvron-en-Auge in the Pays d'Auge region of Normandy, which has been granted appellation contrôlée status for its cider and calvados brandy made from cider. The partnership aims to promote economic and touristic development by creating opportunities related to apples.

== Government ==
Hirosaki has a mayor-council form of government with a directly elected mayor and a unicameral city legislature of 28 members. The city, together with the neighbouring village of Nishimeya, contributes six members to the Aomori Prefectural Assembly. In terms of national politics, the city is part of Aomori 3rd district of the lower house of the Diet of Japan.

== Economy ==
Hirosaki is the regional commercial center for southwest Aomori Prefecture. The main agricultural crops include apples and rice, with Hirosaki accounting for 20% of the total production of apples in Japan.

== Education ==
=== Colleges and universities ===
- Hirosaki University
  - Hirosaki Gakuin University
  - Hirosaki University of Health and Welfare
  - Hirosaki University of Heath and Welfare Junior College
  - School of Allied Medical Sciences, Hirosaki University
- Tohoku Women's College
  - Tohoku Women's Junior College

=== Primary and secondary education ===
Hirosaki has 31 public elementary schools and 15 public junior high schools operated by the city government. There is one national public elementary school and public junior high school, and one private combined elementary/junior high school and one private junior high school. The city also has five public high schools operated by the Aomori prefectural Board of Education and four private high schools.

Public high schools

- Hirosaki Chūō High School
- Hirosaki High School
- Hirosaki Minami High School
- Hirosaki Vocational High School
- Hirosaki Technical High School

Private high schools

- Hirosaki Gakuin Seiai Middle and High School
- Hirosaki Higashi High School
- Shibata Girls' High School
- Tōōgijuku High School

=== Other schools ===
Hirosaki has four special education schools for the handicapped, three of which are operated by Aomori Prefecture, and one by the national government.

== Transportation ==
=== Railways ===
East Japan Railway Company (JR East) – Ōu Main Line

- Ishikawa – Hirosaki – Naijōshi

Kōnan Railway Company – Kōnan Line

- Hirosaki – Hirosaki-Higashikōmae – Undōkōenmae – Nisato,

Kōnan Railway Company – Ōwani Line

- Chūō-Hirosaki – Hirokōshita – Hirosaki Gakuindai-mae – Seiaichūkō-mae – Chitose – Koguriyama – Matsukitai – Tsugaru-Ōsawa – Gijukukōkōmae – Ishikawa – Ishikawa-Poolmae

=== Highways ===
- Tōhoku Expressway
- National Route 7
- National Route 102
- National Route 339
- National Route 394

== Sports and culture ==
- Tsugaru-jamisen, a virtuosic style of Tsugaru-jamisen playing.

=== Sports teams ===
- Blancdieu Hirosaki FC, a football team.

=== Festivals ===
- Hirosaki Neputa Festival, held during the first week of August and was named one of the 100 Soundscapes of Japan by the Ministry of the Environment.
- Hirosaki Apple Blossom Festival, held in early May in Hirosaki Apple Park.
- Hirosaki Cherry Blossom Festival, held at Hirosaki Park surrounding Hirosaki Castle; usually begins in April when approximately 2,600 sakura (Japanese cherry trees) blossom during the Japanese Golden Week holiday period. In 2019, Sakura Miku, a cherry blossom-themed version of the moe anthropomorphic software mascot Hatsune Miku, was appointed the festival's official supporting character. The character also appeared on the cover of the 1 April issue (No. 315) of Kōhō Hirosaki (the city's municipal public relations newsletter).
- Hirosaki Castle Chrysanthemum and Autumn Leaves Festival, held every autumn since 1962. Celebration for the passing summer and upcoming winter season.
- Hirosaki Castle Snow Lantern Festival, first celebrated in 1977. The festival had attracted 310,000 visitors in 1999 and included 165 standing snow lanterns and 300 mini kamakura snow caves.

== Local attractions ==
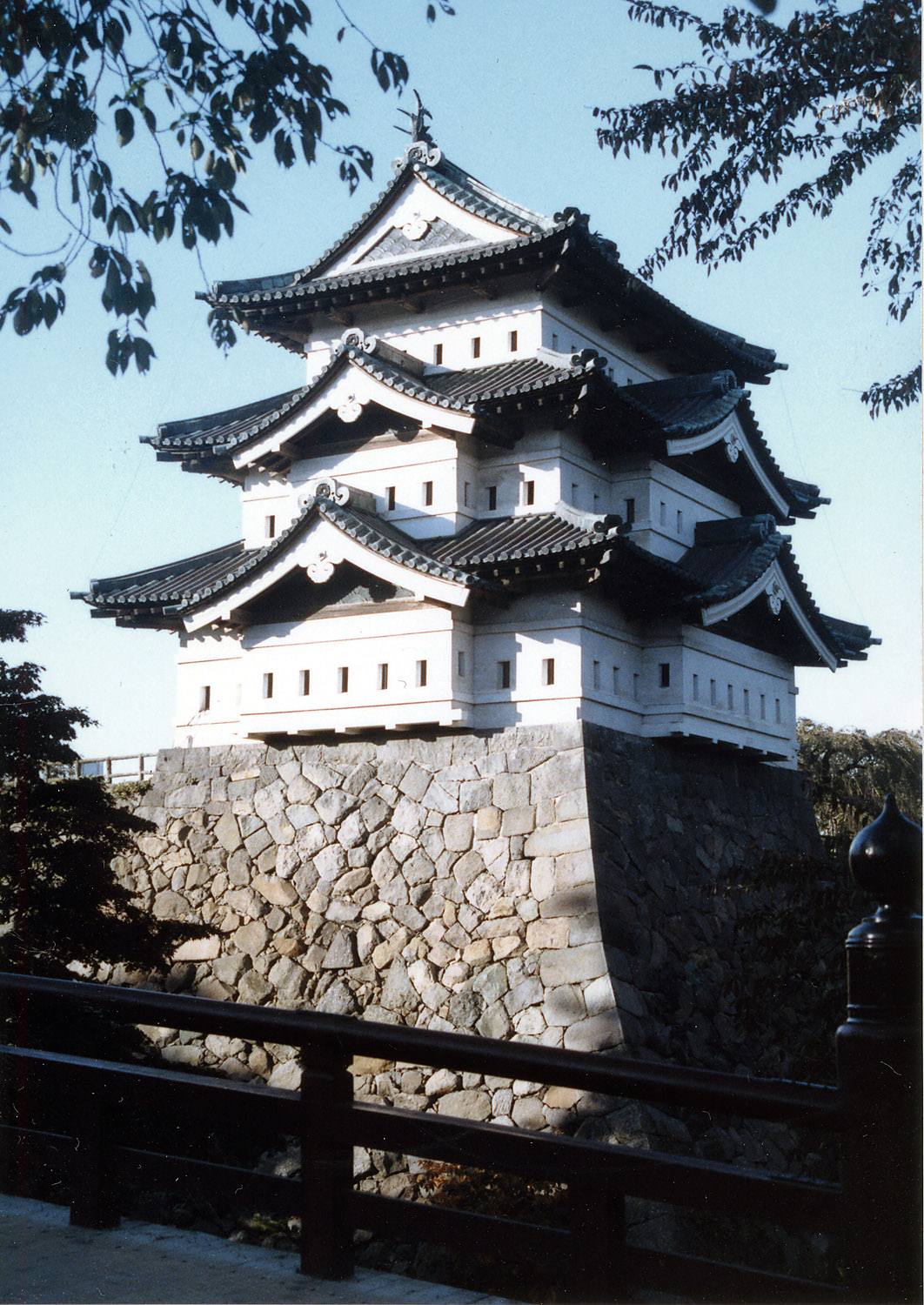
Hirosaki Castle

- Chosho-ji
- Fujita Memorial Japanese Garden
- Hirosaki Castle
- Hirosaki Tōshō-gū
- Iwaki Kōgen Prefectural Natural Park
- Nakamachi Samurai Houses
- Narita Family Gardens, National Place of Scenic Beauty
- Seishō-in
- Ōmori Katsuyama Site, National Historic Site
- Zuiraku-en, National Place of Scenic Beauty

== Notable people from Hirosaki ==
- Daigo Umehara, professional fighting game player and author
- Hirofumi Arai, Zainichi Korean actor (Real Name: Park Kyung-sik, Hangul: 박경식)
- Tomoko Aran, pop singer and lyricist
- Masakatsu Funaki, actor, mixed martial artist and professional wrestler
- Yōjirō Ishizaka, writer
- Ningen Isu 人間椅子(バンド), music band
- Wakanohana Kanji I, sumo wrestler
- Takanohana Kenshi, sumo wrestler
- Shunsuke Kikuchi, musician
- Norio Kudo, professional go player
- Mitsuyo Maeda, judo wrestler
- Goro Kumagai, printmaker, educator
- Juji Nakada, evangelist
- Yoshitomo Nara, modern artist
- Iwakiyama Ryūta, sumo wrestler
- Nui Sano, painter
- Takahiro Shimoyama, basketball player
- Wakanosato Shinobu, sumo wrestler
- Shūji Terayama, modern artist
- Hisashi Tonomura, musician
