= Iwaki Kōgen Prefectural Natural Park =

Aomori natural park

Coordinates: 40°37′19″N 140°20′26″E

- 岩木高原県立自然公園
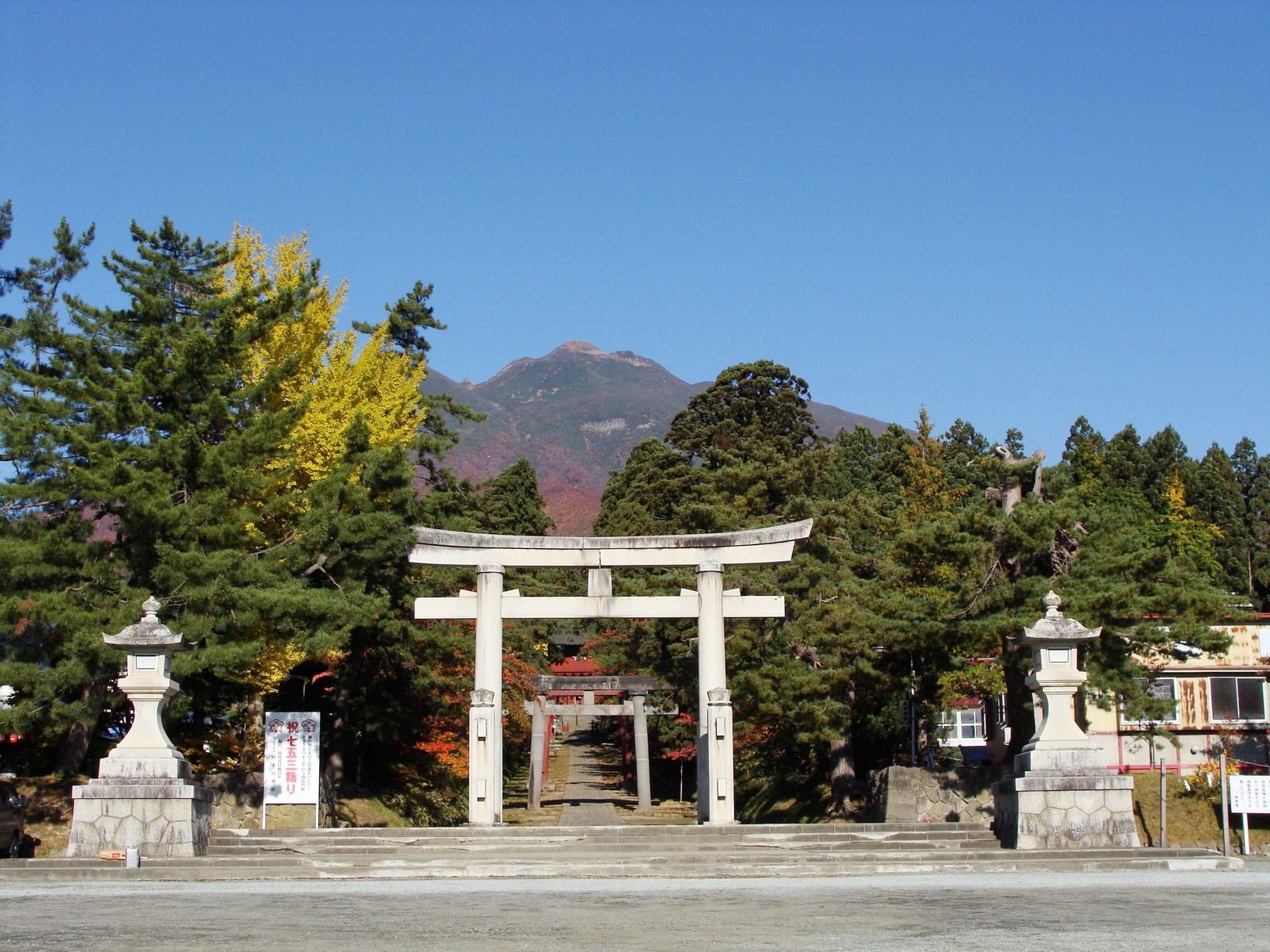
- Iwakiyama Jinja
- Interactive map of Iwaki Kōgen Prefectural Natural Park
- Location: Aomori Prefecture, Japan
- Nearest city: Hirosaki
- Area: 25.87 km^{2} (9.99 sq mi)
- Established: 14 October 1958

Iwaki Kōgen Prefectural Natural Park (岩木高原県立自然公園, Iwaki Kōgen kenritsu shizen-kōen) is a Prefectural Natural Park in southwest Aomori Prefecture, Japan. Established in 1958, the park lies wholly within the municipality of Hirosaki.

== See also ==
- National Parks of Japan
