= Chitose Station (Aomori) =

Railway station in Hirosaki, Aomori Prefecture, Japan

Chitose Station 千年駅
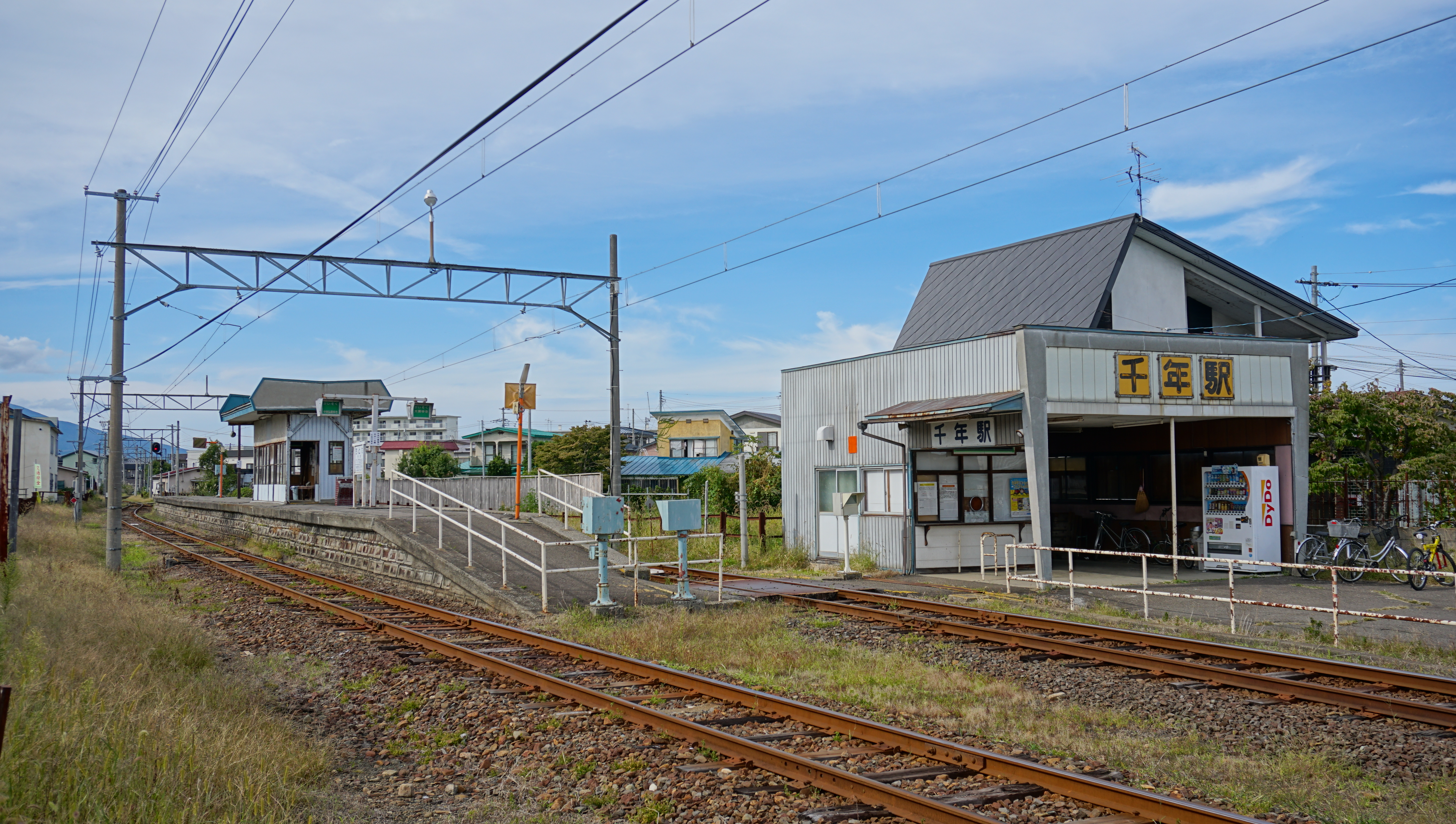
- Chitose Station, September 2019

General information
- Location: Matsubara-nishi 3-3-8, Hirosaki-shi, Aomori-ken 036-8142; Japan
- Coordinates: 40°34′01.71″N 140°28′50.70″E
- Operator: Kōnan Railway
- Line: ■ Ōwani Line
- Distance: 10.0 km from Ōwani
- Platforms: 1 island platform

Other information
- Status: Unstaffed
- Website: Official website (in Japanese)

History
- Opened: January 26, 1952
- Former names: Tsugaru-Chitose (to 2008)

Passengers
- FY2015: 114
Location
- Location within Aomori Prefecture Location within Japan

Chitose Station (千年駅, Chitose-eki) is a railway station in the city of Hirosaki, Aomori Prefecture, Japan, operated by the private railway operator, Kōnan Railway Company. The station's name is transliterated as "Titose" on its signage.

== Lines ==
Chitose Station is served by the Kōnan Railway Ōwani Line, and lies 10.0 kilometers from the southern terminus of the line at Ōwani Station.

== Station layout ==
Chitose Station has a single island platform with two tracks, connected to the station building by a level crossing. The station is attended only during morning and evening commuting hours.

=== Platforms ===
1	■ Kōnan Railway Ōwani Line	for Ōwani
2	■ Kōnan Railway Ōwani Line	forChūō-Hirosaki

== Adjacent stations ==
«	Service	»
Kōnan Railway Kōnan Line
Koguriyama	-	Seiaichūkō-mae

== History ==
Chitose Station was opened as Tsugaru-Chitose Station 津軽千年駅 (Tsugaru-Chitose-eki) on January 26, 1952, with the opening of the Ōwani Line. The station name was changed to its present name on April 1, 2008.

== Surrounding area ==
The station is located in a residential area of Hirosaki

== See also ==
- List of railway stations in Japan
