= Ishikawa Station (Kōnan Railway) =

Railway station in Hirosaki, Aomori Prefecture, Japan

Ishikawa Station 石川駅
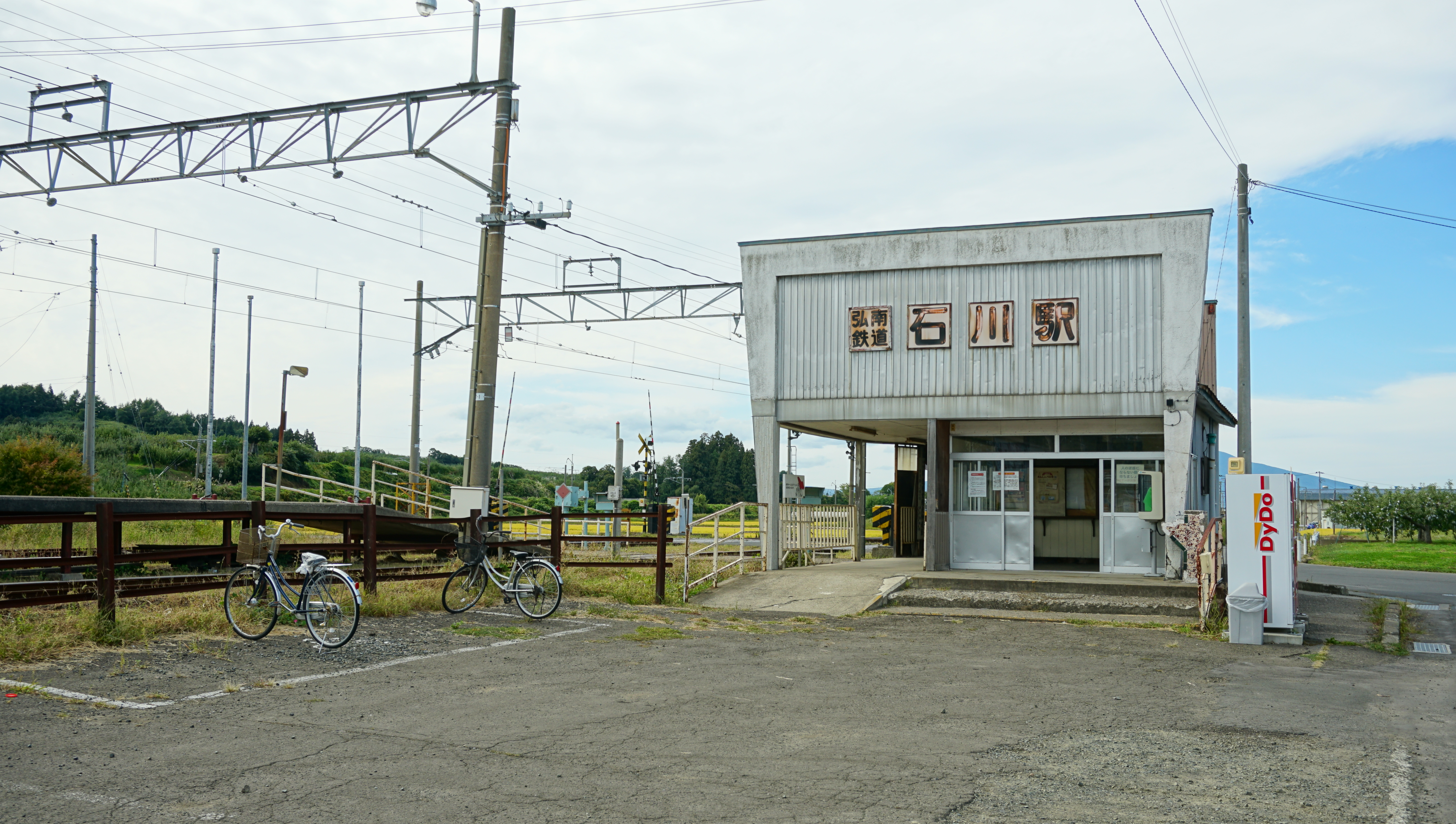
- Ishikawa Station I September 2019

General information
- Location: Ishikawa Daibutsushita 36, Hirosaki-shi, Aomori-ken 036-8124; Japan
- Coordinates: 40°33′4.01″N 140°32′27.92″E
- Operator: Kōnan Railway
- Line: ■ Ōwani Line
- Distance: 4.4 km from Ōwani
- Platforms: 1 island platform

Other information
- Status: Unstaffed
- Website: Official website (in Japanese)

History
- Opened: January 26, 1952
- Former names: Shin-Ishikawa (to 1986)

Passengers
- FY2015: 150
Location
- Location within Aomori Prefecture Location within Japan

Ishikawa Station (石川駅, Ishikawa-eki) is a railway station in the city of Hirosaki, Aomori Prefecture, Japan, operated by the private railway operator, Kōnan Railway Company

== Lines ==
Ishikawa Station is served by the Kōnan Railway Ōwani Line, and lies 4.4 kilometers from the southern terminus of the line at Ōwani Station.

== Station layout ==
The station has one island platform. There is no station building, but only a weather shelter on the platform. The station is unattended.

=== Platforms ===
1	■ Kōnan Railway Ōwani Line	forChūō-Hirosaki
2	■ Kōnan Railway Ōwani Line	for Ōwani

== Adjacent stations ==
The adjacent station towards Chuo-Hirosaki station is Gijukukōkōmae, and the adjacent station towards Ōwani station is Ishikawa Pool-Mae station.

«	Service	»
Kōnan Railway Kōnan Line
Ishikawa Pool	-	Gijukukōkōmae

== History ==
Ishikawa Station was opened on January 26, 1952 as Shin-Ishikawa Station (新石川駅, Shin-Ishikawa-eki), with the opening of the Kōnan Railway. It was renamed to its present name on April 1, 1986.

With the December, 2024 announcement that the Konan Owani line will close by the end of 2026, the station will most likely close as part of that process.

== Surrounding area ==
It is located approximately a kilometer away from the JR East Ishikawa Station on the Ōu Main Line.

== See also ==
- List of railway stations in Japan
