= Nagamine Station =

Railway station in Ōwani, Akita Prefecture, Japan

Nagamine Station 長峰駅
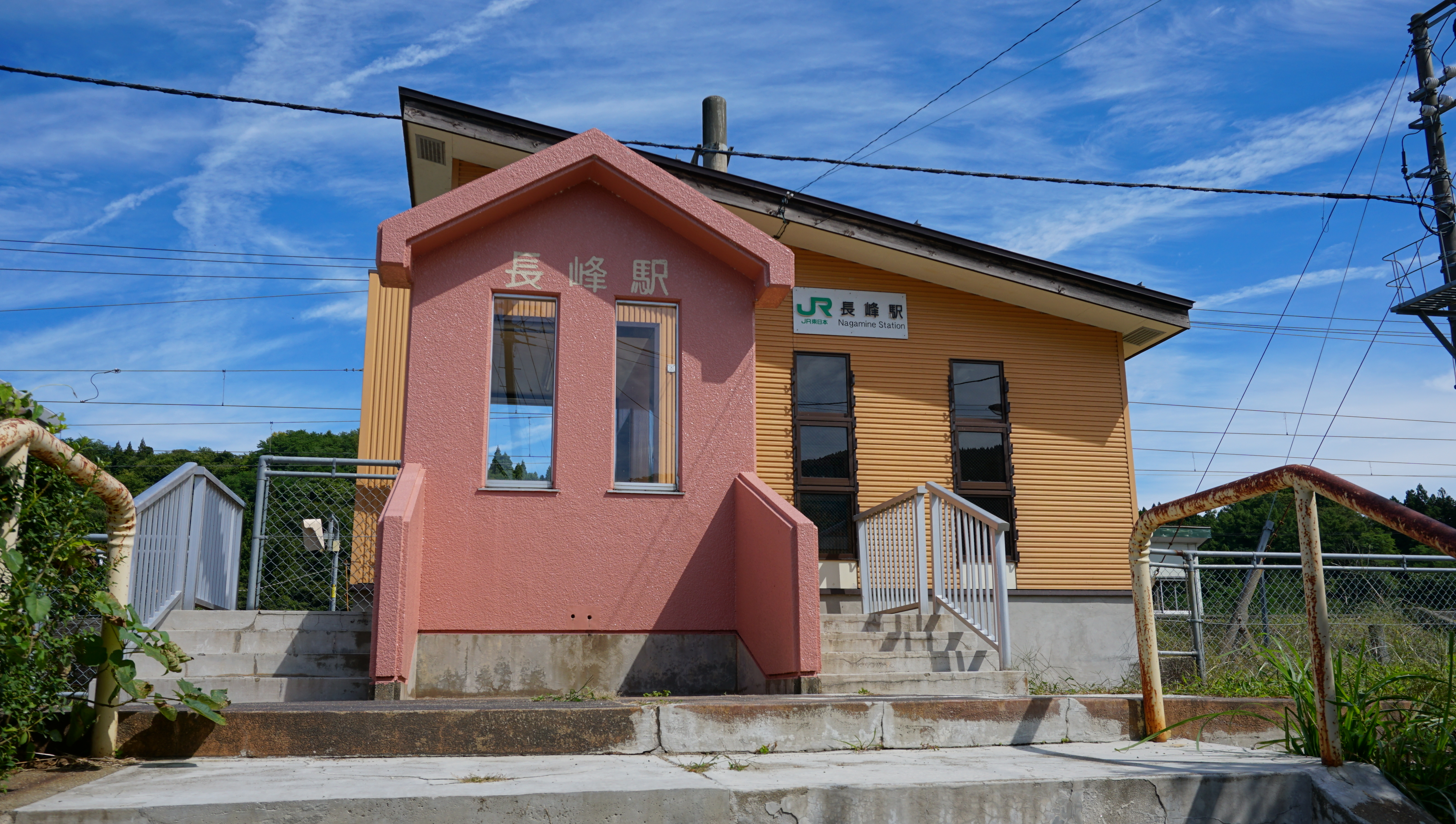
- Nagamine Station in September 2019

General information
- Location: 413-3 Nakamine Maeda, Ōwani-machi, Minamitsugaru-gun, Aomori-ken 038-0202; Japan
- Coordinates: 40°30′57.97″N 140°36′10.94″E
- Operator: JR East
- Line: ■ Ōu Main Line
- Distance: 432.0 km from Fukushima
- Platforms: 2 side platforms

Other information
- Status: Unstaffed
- Website: Official website

History
- Opened: December 1, 1952

Services
| Preceding station | JR East | Following station |
|---|---|---|
| Ikarigaseki towards Shinjō | Ōu Main Line Local | Ōwani-Onsen towards Aomori |
Location
- Location within Aomori Prefecture Location within Japan

Nagamine Station (長峰駅, Nagamine-eki) is a railway station on the northern Ōu Main Line in the town of Ōwani, Aomori Prefecture, Japan, operated by East Japan Railway Company (JR East).

== Lines ==
Nagamine Station is served by the Ōu Main Line, and is located 432.0 km from the starting point of the line at Fukushima.

== Station layout ==
Nagamine Station has two opposed side platforms connected by a footbridge, with a small station building adjacent to Track 1.

=== Platforms ===
| 1 | ■ Ōu Main Line | for Hirosaki and Aomori |
| 2 | ■ Ōu Main Line | for Ōdate and Akita |

== History ==
Nagamine Station was opened on December 1, 1952 as a station on the Japanese National Railways (JNR). It has been unattended since 1972. With the privatization of the JNR on April 1, 1987, it came under the operational control of JR East.

== Surrounding area ==
- Nagamine Post Office
- National Route 7

== See also ==
- List of railway stations in Japan
