= Ōwani, Aomori =

Ōwani 大鰐町
- Town
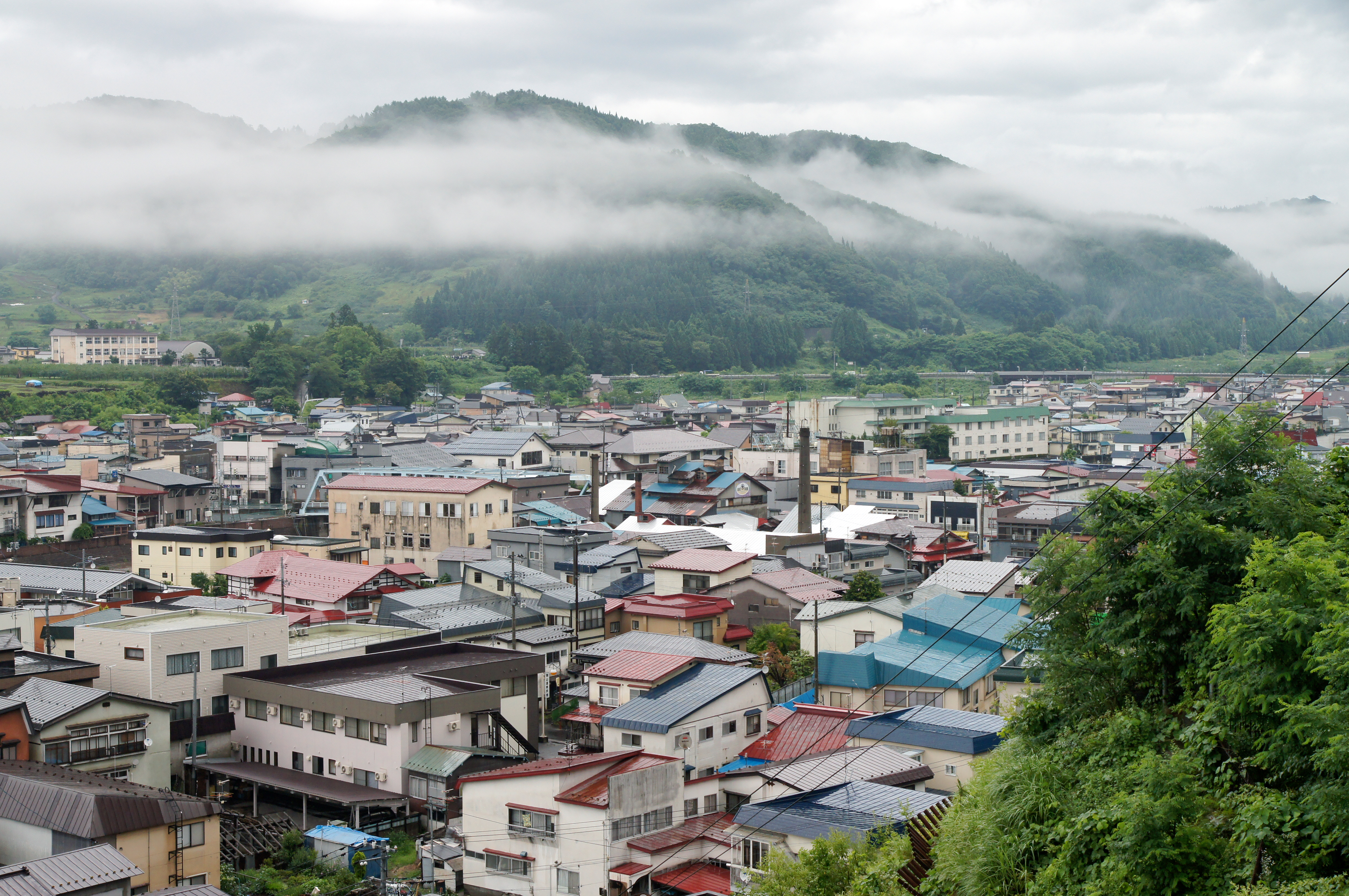
- View of Ōwani Onsen

- Flag Seal
- Location of Owani in Aomori Prefecture

- Coordinates: 40°31′06″N 140°34′04″E
- Country: Japan
- Region: Tōhoku
- Prefecture: Aomori
- District: Minamitsugaru

Area
  - Total: 163.43 km^{2} (63.10 sq mi)

Population (December 31, 2025)
  - Total: 8,009
  - Density: 49.01/km^{2} (126.9/sq mi)
- Time zone: UTC+9 (Japan Standard Time)
- Phone number: 0172-48-2111
- Address: Hagurodate 5-3, Ōwani-machi, Minamitsugaru-gun, Aomori-ken 038-0292
- Website: Official website
- Symbols
- Bird: Japanese bush warbler
- Flower: Rhododendron
- Tree: Katsura

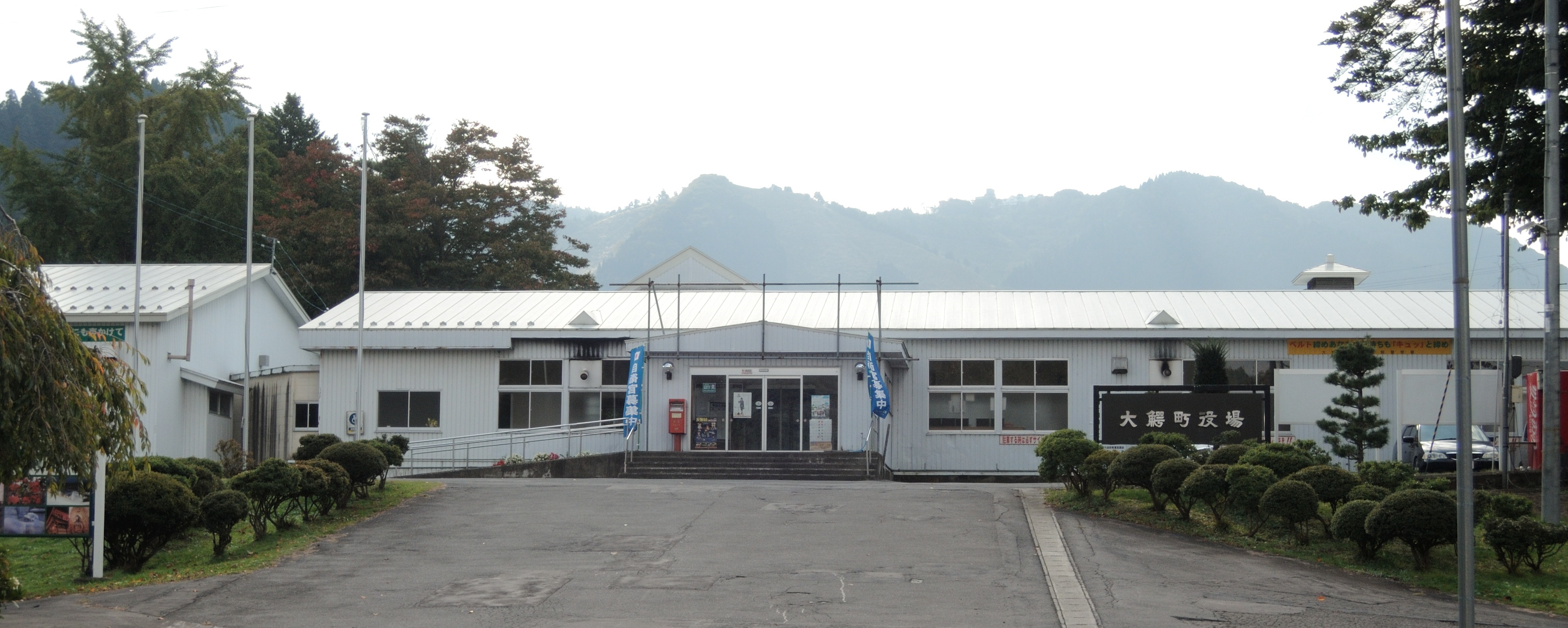
Ōwani town hall

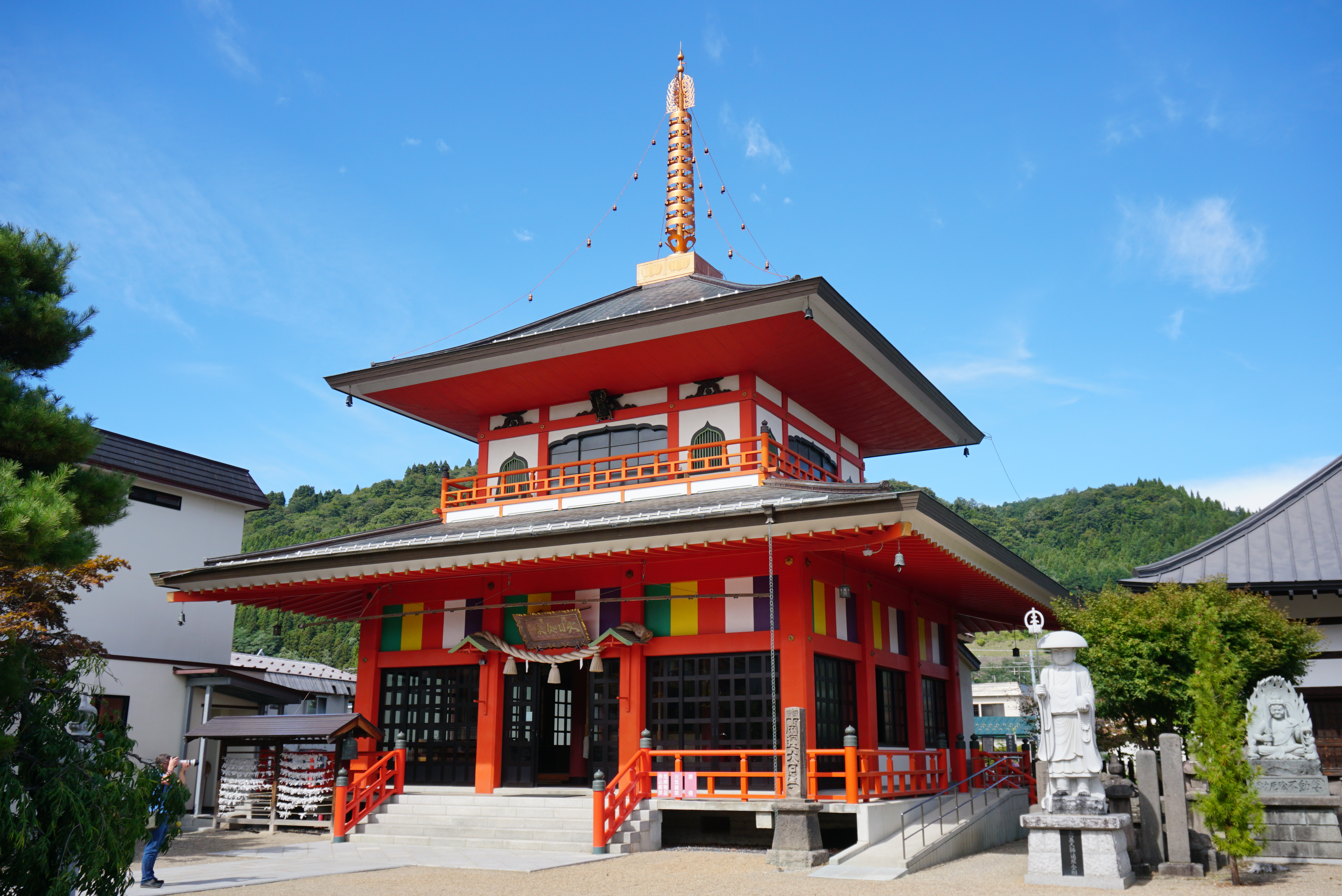
Daien-ji

Ōwani (大鰐町, Ōwani-machi) is a town located in Aomori Prefecture, Japan. As of 31 December 2025, the town had an estimated population of 8,009 people in 3978 households and a population density of 53 persons per km^{2}. The total area of the town is 163.41 square kilometres (63.09 sq mi). Skiing is very popular in Ōwani Town, and seven Olympic athletes have grown up there.

== Geography ==
Ōwani, located in Minamitsugaru District, occupies the hilly southern border between south-central Aomori Prefecture and northern Akita Prefecture, to the southeast of the city of Hirosaki.

=== Neighbouring municipalities ===
Akita Prefecture

- Ōdate

Aomori Prefecture

- Hirakawa
- Hirosaki

=== Climate ===
The town has a cold humid continental climate (Köppen Dfb) characterized by warm short summers and long cold winters with heavy snowfall. The average annual temperature in Ōwani is 9.6 °C. The average annual rainfall is 1397 mm with September as the wettest month. The temperatures are highest on average in August, at around 23.4 °C, and lowest in January, at around -3.0 °C.

== Demographics ==
Per Japanese census data, the population of Ōwani has decreased steadily over the past 60 years.

Historical population
Year	Pop.	±% p.a.
1960	18,777	—
1970	16,724	−1.15%
1980	16,312	−0.25%
1990	14,751	−1.00%
2000	12,881	−1.35%
2010	10,978	−1.59%
2020	8,665	−2.34%

== History ==
During the Edo period, the area around Ōwani was controlled by the Tsugaru clan of Hirosaki Domain. After the Meiji Restoration, it became a village within Minamitsugaru District of Aomori Prefecture with the establishment of the modern municipalities system on April 1, 1889. On April 1, 1923, Ōwani was proclaimed a town. On July 1, 1954, it annexed neighboring Kuradate Town, but lost a portion of its territory to Hirosaki City on September 30, 1964.

== Government ==
Ōwani has a mayor-council form of government with a directly elected mayor and a unicameral town legislature of 12 members. Ōwani, together with the city of Hirakawa contributes three members to the Aomori Prefectural Assembly. In terms of national politics, the town is part of Aomori 3rd district of the lower house of the Diet of Japan.

== Economy ==
The economy of Ōwani is heavily dependent on agriculture, horticulture and forestry. Tourism from ski resorts and onsen hot springs also contribute to the local economy. Mount Ajara was a venue for the 2003 Asian Winter Games.

== Education ==
Ōwani has one public elementary school and one public junior high school operated by the town government. The town's only high school, a branch of Hirosaki Minami High School, closed in 2013.

== Transportation ==
=== Railway ===
East Japan Railway Company (JR East) - Ōu Main Line

- Nagamine - Ōwani-Onsen

- Kōnan Railway Ōwani Line

- Ōwani - Shukugawara - Sabaishi

=== Highway ===
- Tōhoku Expressway – Owani Interchange
- National Route 7

== Local attractions ==
- Daien-ji
- Ōwani onsen

== Noted people from Ōwani ==
- Wakanohana Kanji II, sumo wrestler

=== Olympic skiers ===
- Shinzo Yamada, 1936 Winter Olympics
- Ginzo Yamada, 1936 Winter Olympics
- Kenichi Yamamoto, 1952 Winter Olympics
- Yuji Yamanaka, 1964 Winter Olympics
- Akiyoshi Matsuoka, 1968 Winter Olympics and 1972 Winter Olympics
- Hideaki Yamada, 1984 Winter Olympics
- Nobuko Fukuda, 2002 Winter Olympics, 2006 Winter Olympics and 2010 Winter Olympics

== Sister cities ==
- Novi, Michigan, United States (in Metro Detroit)
