= Ishikawa Pool Station =

Railway station in Hirosaki, Aomori Prefecture, Japan

Ishikawapūrumae Station 石川プール前駅
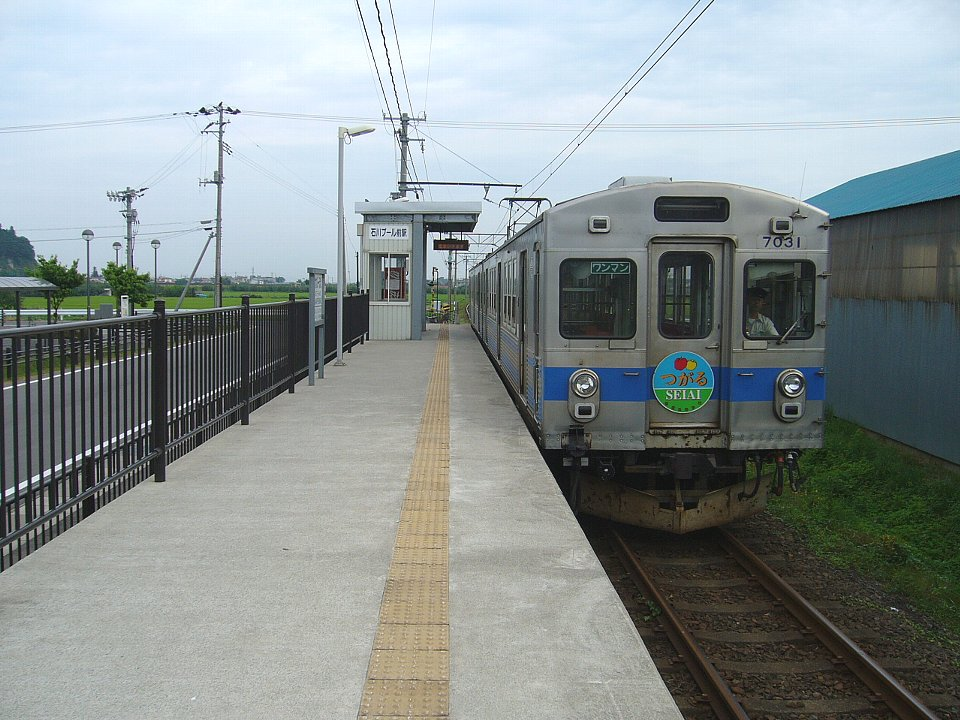
- Ishikawapūrumae Station

General information
- Location: Koganezaki Muramoto 60-5, Hirosaki-shi, Aomori-ken 036-8123; Japan
- Coordinates: 40°32′35.66″N 140°33′00.97″E
- Operator: Kōnan Railway
- Line: ■ Ōwani Line
- Distance: 3.0 km from Ōwani
- Platforms: 1 side platform

Other information
- Status: Unstaffed
- Website: Official website (in Japanese)

History
- Opened: October 1, 2002

Passengers
- FY2015: 41
Location
- Location within Aomori Prefecture Location within Japan

Ishikawa Pool Station (石川プール前駅, Ishikawapūrumae-eki) is a railway station in the city of Hirosaki, Aomori Prefecture, Japan, operated by the private railway operator, Kōnan Railway Company. The English station name has changed from Furigana spelling to English word "Pool" in 2020, when Station numbering was introduced.

== Lines ==
Ishikawa Pool Station is served by the Kōnan Railway Ōwani Line, and lies 3.0 kilometers from the southern terminus of the line at Ōwani Station.

== Station layout ==
The station has one side platform serving single bi-directional track. There is no station building, but only a weather shelter on the platform. The station is unattended.

== Adjacent stations ==
«	Service	»
Kōnan Railway Kōnan Line
Sabaishi	-	Ishikawa

== History ==
Ishikawa Pool Station was opened on October 1, 2002, with the opening of the Hirosaki City Ishikawa Swimming Pool. Its 25.3 million yen construction cost was financed by the Hirosaki City government.

== Surrounding area ==
- Hirosaki City Ishikawa Swimming Pool

== See also ==
- List of railway stations in Japan
