= Shukugawara Station (Aomori) =

Railway station in Ōwani, Akita Prefecture, Japan

Shukugawara Station 宿川原駅
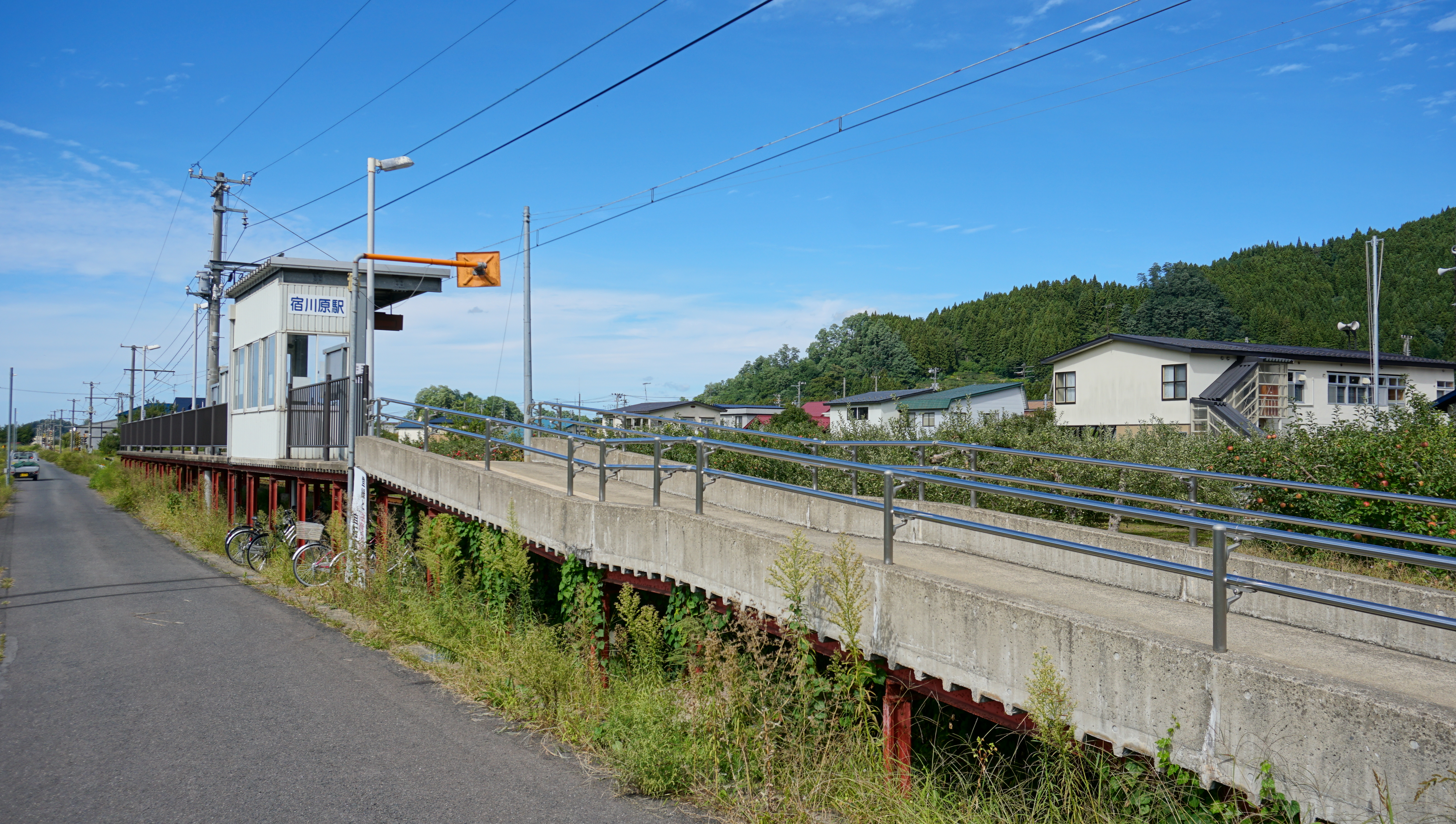
- Shukugawara Station I September 2019

General information
- Location: Kawasaki Shukugawara, Ōwani-machi, Minamitsugaru-gun, Aomori-ken 038-0231; Japan
- Coordinates: 40°31′30.53″N 140°33′27.31″E
- Operator: Kōnan Railway
- Line: ■ Ōwani Line
- Distance: 0.9 km from Ōwani
- Platforms: 1 side platform

Other information
- Status: Unstaffed
- Website: Official website (in Japanese)

History
- Opened: January 26, 1952

Passengers
- FY2015: 27
Location
- Location within Aomori Prefecture Location within Japan

Shukugawara Station (宿川原駅, Shukugawara-eki) is a railway station in the town of Ōwani, Aomori Prefecture, Japan, operated by the Kōnan Railway Company

== Lines ==
Shukugawara Station is served by the Kōnan Railway Ōwani Line, and lies 0.9 kilometers from the southern terminus of the line at Ōwani Station.

== Station layout ==
Shukugawara Station has one side platform serving single bi-directional track. There is no station building, but only a weather shelter on the platform. The station is unattended.

== Adjacent stations ==
«	Service	»
Kōnan Railway Kōnan Line
Ōwani	-	Sabaishi

== History ==
Shukugawara Station was opened on January 26, 1952 with the opening of the Kōnan Railway. In January 2002, the station was relocated 200 meters towards Sabaishi Station.

== Surrounding area ==
- Aomori Prefectural Route 201

== See also ==
- List of railway stations in Japan
