= Kenichi Yamamoto (skier) =

Japanese cross-country skier (1922–2002)

Kenichi Yamamoto (山本 謙一, Yamamoto Ken'ichi) (November 18, 1922 – February 26, 2002) was a Japanese cross-country skier who competed in the 1950s. He finished 22nd in the 18 km event at the 1952 Winter Olympics in Oslo.
