= Ōwani Station =

Railway station in Ōwani, Aomori Prefecture, Japan

Ōwani-Onsen Station 大鰐温泉駅
- Ōwani-Onsen Station in September 2024

General information
- Location: 34-20 Ōwani Maeda, Ōwani-machi Minamitsugaru-gun, Aomori-ken 038-0211; Japan
- Coordinates: 40°31′17.9″N 140°34′1.7″E
- Operator: JR East; Kōnan Railway Company
- Lines: ■ Ōu Main Line; ■ Kōnan Railway Ōwani Line
- Distance: 435.3 km from Fukushima
- Platforms: 2 island + 1 side platform

Other information
- Status: Staffed
- Website: Official website

History
- Opened: October 21, 1895
- Former names: Ōwani Station (until 1991)

Passengers
- FY2016: 212 daily

Services
Preceding station	JR East	Following station
Ikarigaseki towards Akita	Tsugaru	Hirosaki towards Aomori
Ikarigaseki towards Akita	Ōu Main Line Rapid	Hirosaki towards Aomori
Nagamine towards Shinjō	Ōu Main Line Local	Ishikawa towards Aomori
Preceding station	Kōnan Railway	Following station
Shukugawara towards Chūō-Hirosaki	Ōwani Line	Terminus
Location
- Location within Aomori Prefecture Location within Japan

Ōwani Station (大鰐駅, Ōwani-eki) of the Kōnan Railway Company and Ōwani-Onsen Station (大鰐温泉駅, Ōwani-Onsen-eki) of East Japan Railway Company (JR East) on the northern Ōu Main Line form an integrated railway station in the town of Ōwani, Minamitsugaru District, Aomori Prefecture, Japan.

== Lines ==
Ōwani-Onsen Station is served by the Ōu Main Line, and is located 435.3 km from the starting point of the line at Fukushima. Kōnan Railway's Ōwani Station is the southern terminus of the Kōnan Railway Ōwani Line.

== Station layout ==
JR Ōwani-Onsen Station has one island platform and one side platform serving tracks 1 to 3. The Kōnan Railway Ōwani Station has one island platform serving tracks 4 and 5; however, in practice only track 4 is in use.

=== Platforms ===
1	■ Ōu Main Line	for Hirosaki and Aomori
2, 3	■ Ōu Main Line	for Higashi-Noshiro and Akita
4, 5	■ Kōnan Railway Ōwani Line	for Chūō-Hirosaki

== History ==
The station opened on October 21, 1895 as Ōwani Station (大鰐駅) on the Japanese government railways, the predecessor to the Japanese National Railways (JNR). A footbridge connecting the platforms was completed in 1915, and the station building in 1921.

With the privatization of JNR on April 1, 1987, it came under the operational control of JR East. On March 16, 1991, it was renamed Ōwani-Onsen Station.

The Kōnan Railway Ōwani Station opened on January 26, 1952. On October 1, 1970 it was renamed Kōnan-Ōwani Station (大鰐駅) to distinguish it from the adjacent JNR station; however, it reverted to its original name on April 1, 1986.

== Passenger statistics ==
In fiscal 2016, the JR East station was used by an average of 212 passengers daily (boarding passengers only).

Ōwani Station 大鰐駅
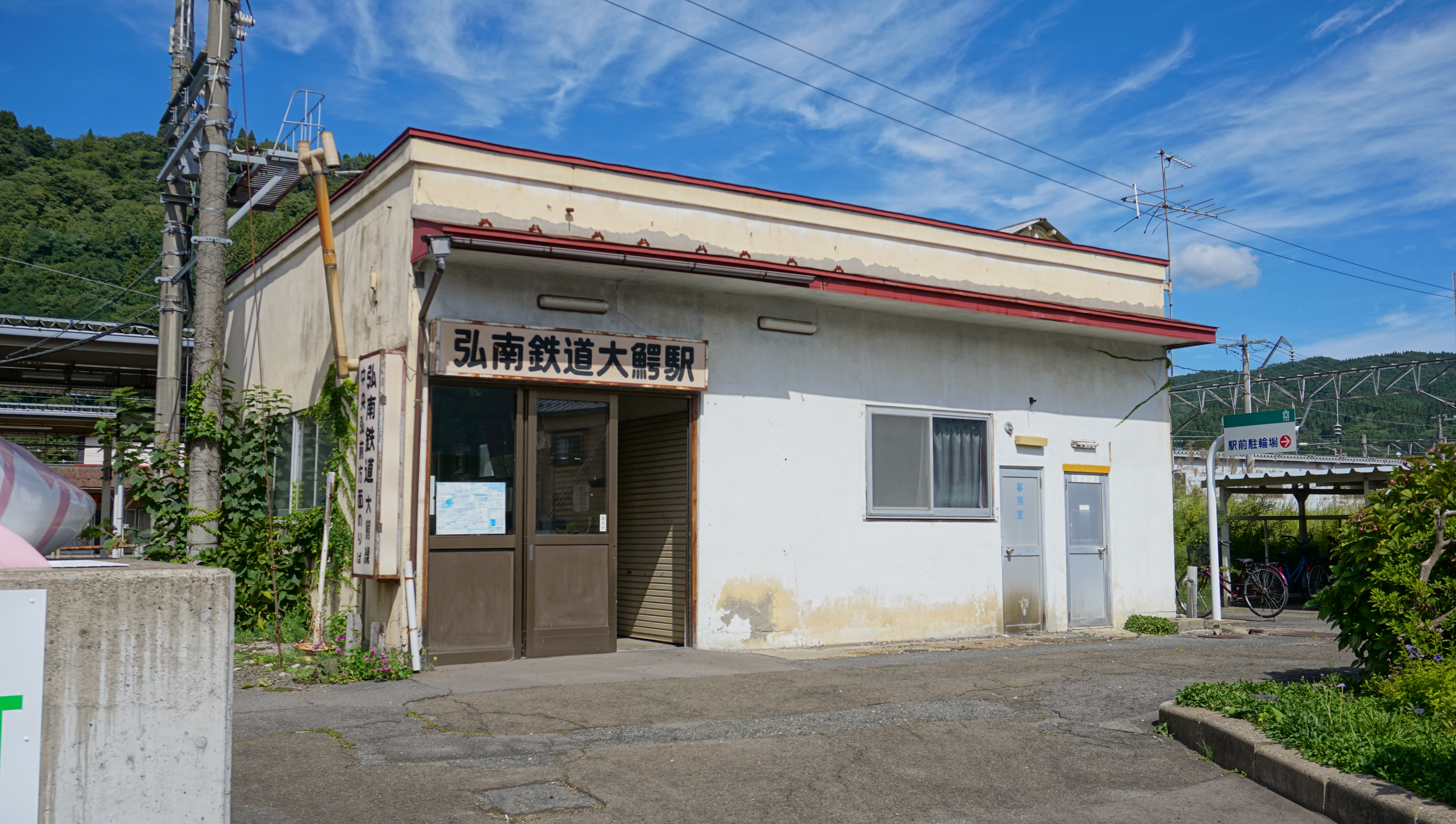
- Ōwani Station in September 2019

General information
- Location: 34-20 Ōwani Maeda, Ōwani-machi, Minamitsugaru-gun, Aomori-ken 038-0211; Japan
- Operator: Kōnan Railway Company
- Line: ■ Ōwani Line

History
- Opened: January 26, 1952
Location

== Surrounding area ==
- Aomori Bank Ōwani branch
- Ōwani Post Office
- Ōwani Onsen
- National Route 101

== See also ==
- List of railway stations in Japan
