= Nisato Station =

Railway station in Hirosaki, Aomori Prefecture, Japan

Nisato Station 新里駅
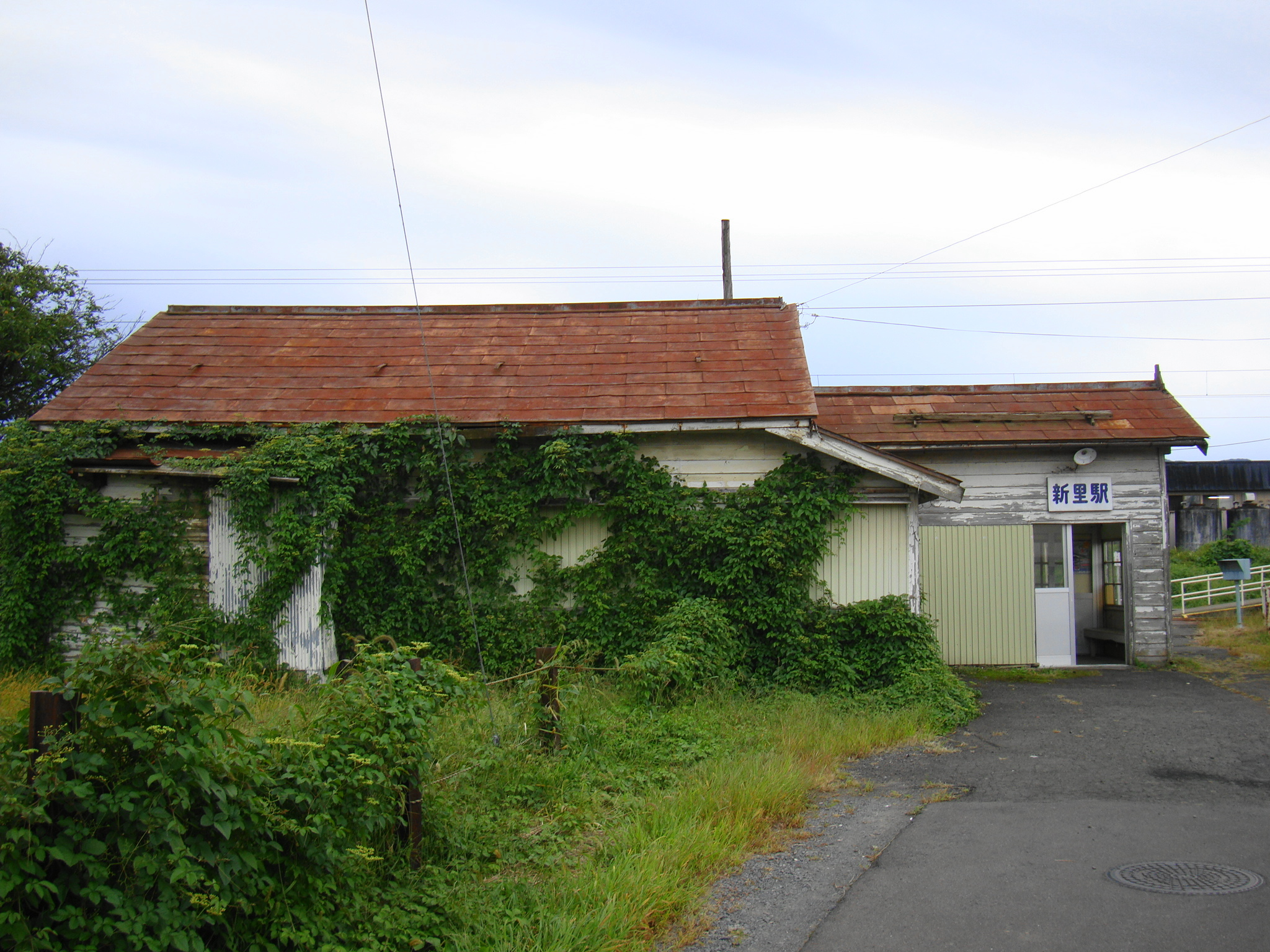
- Nisato Station in November 2012

General information
- Location: Nisato Higashi-Satomi 14-2, Hirosaki-shi, Aomori-ken 036-8083; Japan
- Coordinates: 40°35′14.73″N 140°31′14.42″E
- Operator: Kōnan Railway
- Line: ■ Kōnan Line
- Distance: 3.6 km from Hirosaki
- Platforms: 1 island platform
- Tracks: 2

Other information
- Status: Unstaffed
- Website: Official website (in Japanese)

History
- Opened: September 7, 1927
Location
- Location within Aomori Prefecture Location within Japan

Nisato Station (新里駅, Nisato-eki) is a railway station on the Kōnan Railway Kōnan Line in Hirosaki, Aomori, Japan, operated by the private railway operator Kōnan Railway Company.

== Lines ==
Nisato Station is served by the Kōnan Railway Kōnan Line, and lies 3.6 kilometers from the northern terminus of the line at Hirosaki,

== Station layout ==
Nisato Station has a one island platform. The station building is connected to the platform by a level crossing and is unattended.

=== Platforms ===
1	■ Kōnan Railway Kōnan Line	for Hirosaki
2	■ Kōnan Railway Kōnan Line	for Kuroishi

== Adjacent stations ==
«	Service	»
Kōnan Railway Kōnan Line
Undōkōenmae	-	Tachita

== History ==
Nisato Station was opened on September 7, 1927, as a signal stop. It was elevated to a full station on September 18, 1951. It became a kan'i itaku station in October 1968. Freight operations were discontinued in 1971. The station was unattended from July 1972 until April 1973, and again from November 1987 to the present.

== Surrounding area ==
- A JGR Class 8620 locomotive on display outside the station.

== See also ==
- List of railway stations in Japan
