= Tachita Station =

Railway station in Hirakawa, Aomori Prefecture, Japan

Tachita Station 館田駅
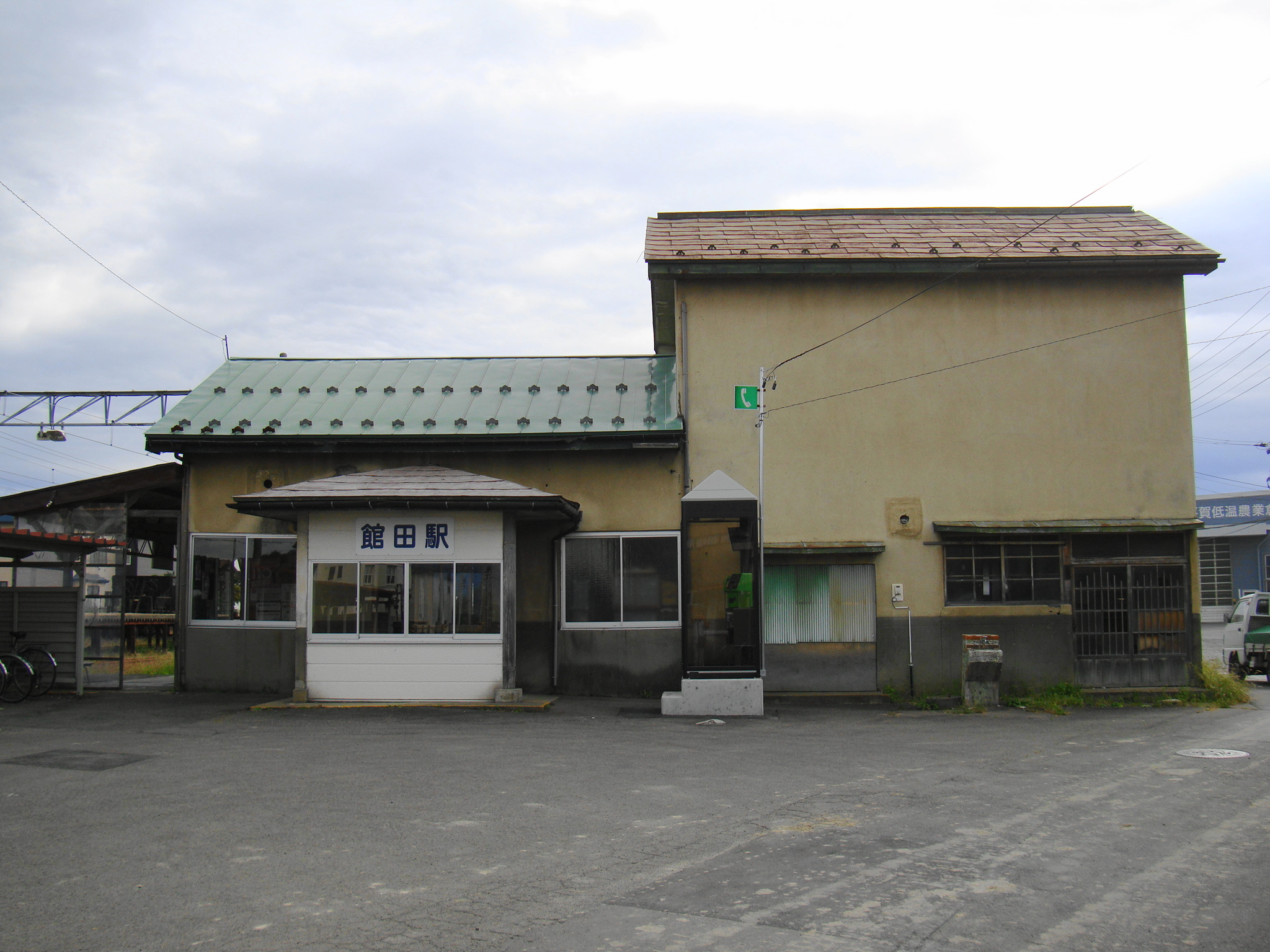
- Tachita Station in September 2010

General information
- Location: Tachita Nakamaeda 98-4, Hirakawa-shi, Aomori-ken 036-0155; Japan
- Coordinates: 40°35′06.35″N 140°32′16.77″E
- Operator: Kōnan Railway
- Line: ■ Kōnan Line
- Distance: 5.2 km from Hirosaki
- Platforms: 1 island platform

Other information
- Status: Unstaffed
- Website: Official website (in Japanese)

History
- Opened: September 7, 1927

Passengers
- FY2015: 164
Location
- Location within Aomori Prefecture Location within Japan

Tachita Station (館田駅, Tachita-eki) is a railway station in the city of Hirakawa, Aomori, Japan, operated by the private railway operator Kōnan Railway Company.

== Lines ==
Tachita Station is served by the Kōnan Railway Kōnan Line, and lies 5.2 kilometers from the northern terminus of the line at Hirosaki,

== Station layout ==
Tachita Station has a one island platform. The station building is connected to the platform by a level crossing and is unattended.

=== Platforms ===
1	■ Kōnan Railway Kōnan Line	for Hirosaki
2	■ Kōnan Railway Kōnan Line	for Kuroishi

== Adjacent stations ==
«	Service	»
Kōnan Railway Kōnan Line
Nisato	-	Hiraka

== History ==
Tachita Station was opened on September 7, 1927. It became a kan'i itaku station in October 1974. Freight operations were discontinued in 1984. On August 28, 1987, an accident occurred at Tachita Station when a conductor started his train without waiting for the signal to turn, thus resulting in a head-on collision with an incoming train. The station has been unattended since April 2006.

== Surrounding area ==
- Tachita onsen

== See also ==
- List of railway stations in Japan
