= Sakaimatsu Station =

Railway station in Kuroishi, Aomori Prefecture, Japan

Sakaimatsu Station 境松駅
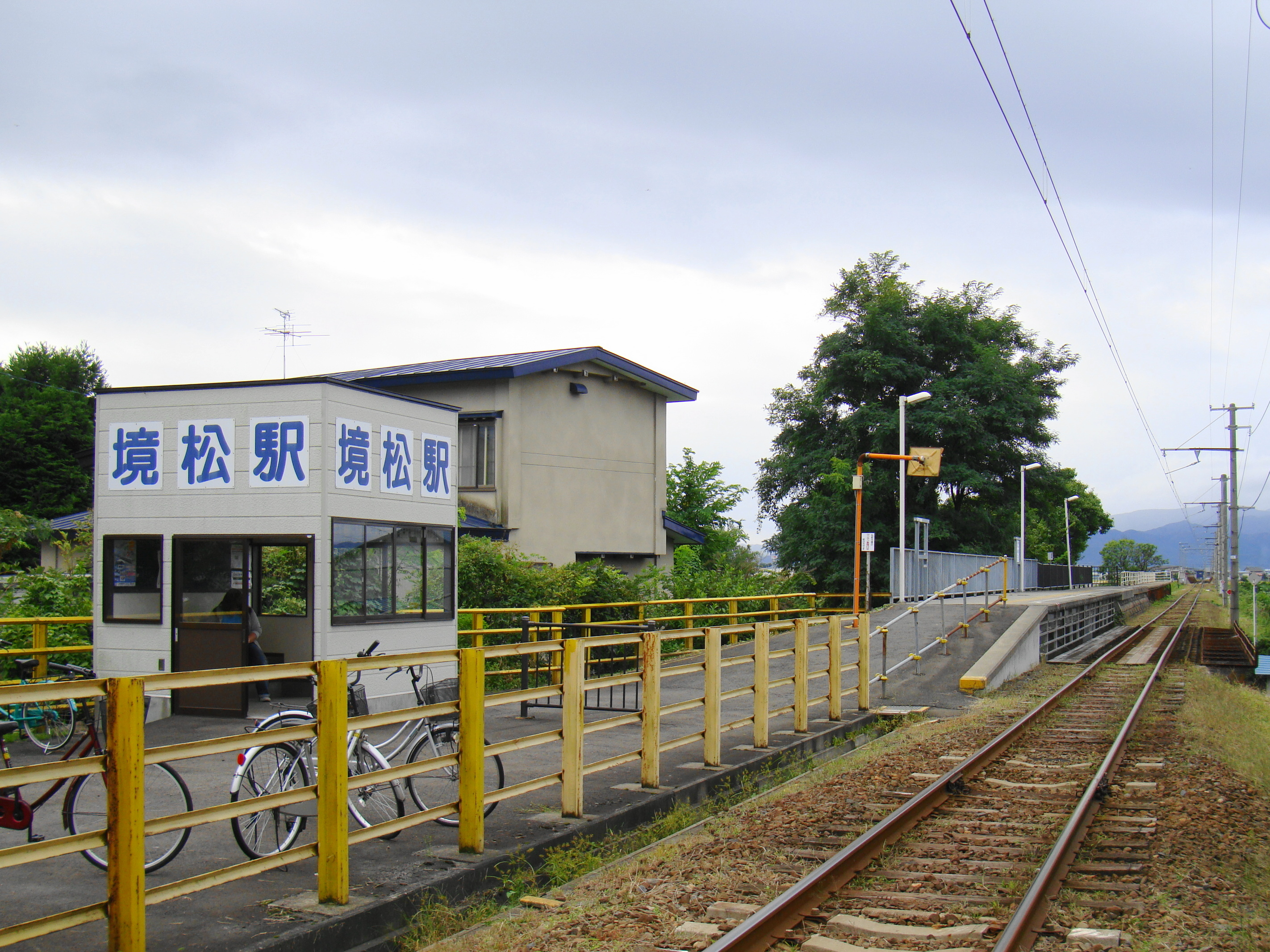
- Sakaimatsu Station in September 2010

General information
- Location: Sakaimatsu 2-46, Kuroishi-shi, Aomori-ken 036-0389; Japan
- Coordinates: 40°38′57.03″N 140°34′33.82″E
- Operator: Kōnan Railway
- Line: ■ Kōnan Line
- Distance: 15.3 km from Hirosaki
- Platforms: 1 side platform
- Tracks: 1

Other information
- Status: Unstaffed
- Website: Official website

History
- Opened: July 1, 1950
- Rebuilt: 1979
Location
- Location within Aomori Prefecture Location within Japan

Sakaimatsu Station (境松駅, Sakaimatsu-eki) is a railway station on the Kōnan Railway Kōnan Line in the city of Kuroishi, Aomori, Japan, operated by the private railway operator Konan Railway.

== Lines ==
Sakaimatsu Station is served by the 16.8 km Konan Railway Konan Line between Hirosaki and Kuroishi, and is located 15.3 km from the southern terminus of the line at Hirosaki.

== Station layout ==
The station has one side platform serving a single bidirectional line. It is unattended, and has no station building other than a small shelter on the platform.

== Adjacent stations ==
«	Service	»
Konan Railway Konan Line
Inakadate	Local	Kuroishi

== History ==
Sakaimatsu Station was opened on July 1, 1950. The station was operated as a (kan'i itaku station from October 1950 to December 1953 by the station master's family, and has been unattended since December 1953. A new station building was completed in July 1997.

== Surrounding area ==
The station is located in a rural area surrounded by farms, with only a few houses nearby.

== See also ==
- List of railway stations in Japan
