= Onoekōkōmae Station =

Railway station in Hirakawa, Aomori Prefecture, Japan

Onoekōkōmae Station 尾上高校前駅
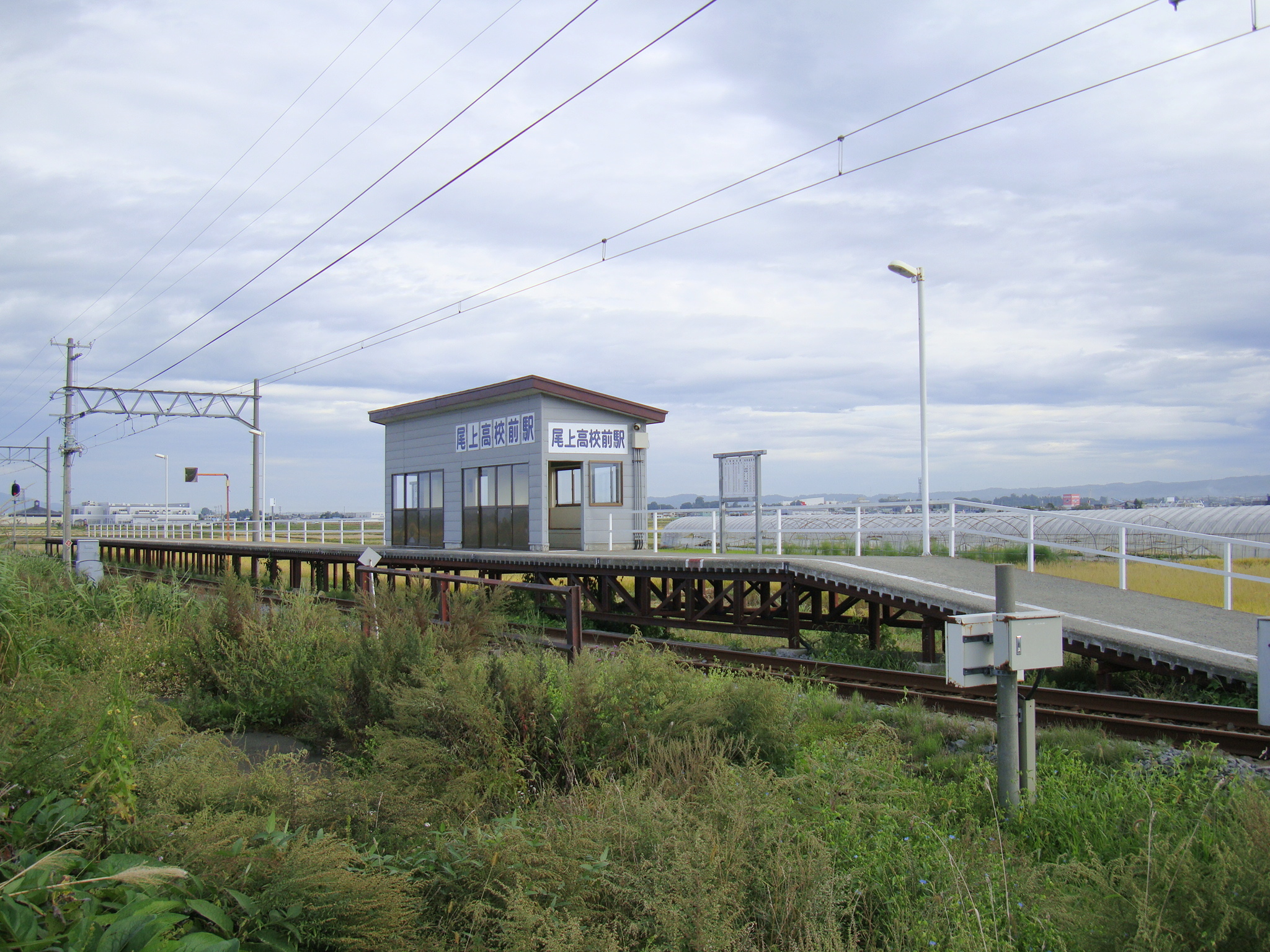
- Onoekōkōmae Station in September 2010

General information
- Location: 50-3 Saruga Kamikawa, Hirakawa-shi, Aomor-ken 036-0242; Japan
- Coordinates: 40°37′31.24″N 140°34′38.82″E
- Operator: Kōnan Railway
- Line: ■ Kōnan Line
- Distance: 12.5 km from Hirosaki
- Platforms: 1 side platform
- Tracks: 1

Other information
- Status: Unstaffed
- Website: Official website (in Japanese)

History
- Opened: April 1, 1999

Passengers
- FY2011: 151 daily
Location
- Location within Aomori Prefecture Location within Japan

Onoekōkōmae Station (尾上高校前駅, Onoekōkōmae-eki) is a railway station on the Kōnan Railway Kōnan Line in Hirakawa, Aomori, Japan, operated by the private railway operator Konan Railway.

== Lines ==
Onoekōkōmae Station is served by the 16.8 km Konan Railway Konan Line between Hirosaki and Kuroishi, and is located 12.5 km from the southern terminus of the line at Hirosaki.

== Station layout ==
The station has a one side platform serving a single bidirectional line. It is unattended, and has no station building other than a small shelter on the platform.

== Adjacent stations ==
«	Service	»
Konan Railway Konan Line
Tsugaru-Onoe	Local	Tamboāto

== History ==
Onoekōkōmae Station opened on April 1, 1999, primarily to serve the local prefectural high school.

== Passenger statistics ==
In fiscal 2011, the station was used by an average of 151 passengers daily.

== Surrounding area ==
- Aomori Prefectural Onoe Integrated High School (青森県立尾上総合高等学校), after which the station takes its name

== See also ==
- List of railway stations in Japan
