= Tamboāto Station =

Railway station in Inakadate, Aomori Prefecture, Japan

Tamboāto Station 田んぼアート駅
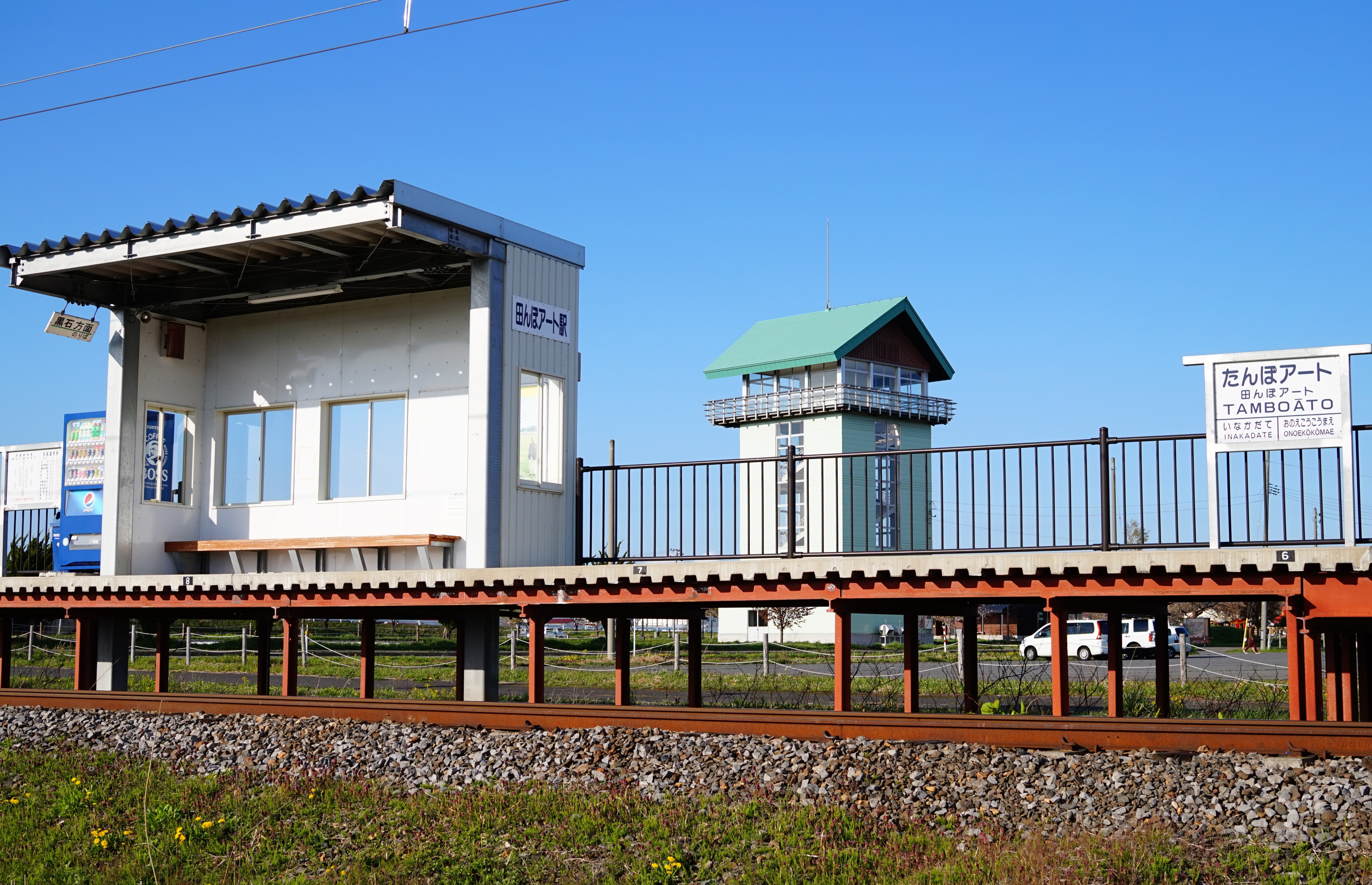
- Tamboāto Station platform in April 2016

General information
- Location: Inakadate, Minamitsugaru-gun, Aomori-ken 038-1111; Japan
- Coordinates: 40°38′00″N 140°34′24″E
- Operator: Kōnan Railway
- Line: ■ Konan Railway Konan Line
- Distance: 13.4 km from Hirosaki
- Platforms: 1 side platform
- Tracks: 1

Other information
- Status: Unstaffed
- Website: Official website

History
- Opened: 27 July 2013
Location
- Location within Aomori Prefecture Location within Japan

Tamboāto Station (田んぼアート駅, Tanboāto-eki) is a railway station on the Konan Railway Konan Line in Inakadate, Aomori, Japan, operated by the private railway operator Konan Railway.

== Lines ==
Tamboāto Station is served by the 16.8 km Konan Railway Konan Line between Hirosaki and Kuroishi and is located 13.4 kilometers from the terminus of the line at Hirosaki.

== Station layout ==
The station has one side platform serving a single bi-directional track. The station is open only between April and November.

== Adjacent stations ==
«	Service	»
Konan Railway Konan Line
Onoekōkōmae	Local	Inakadate

== History ==
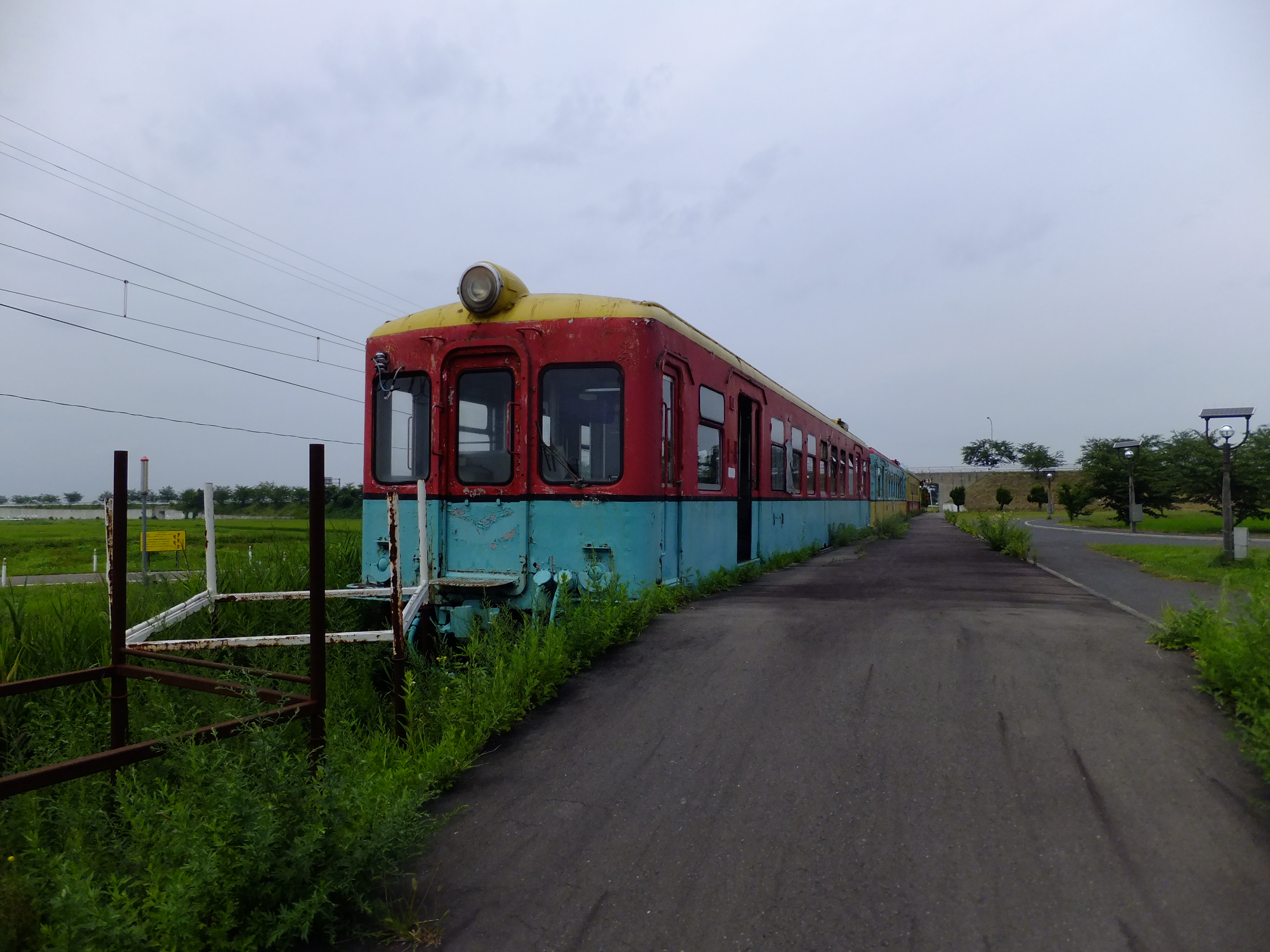
Three former diesel cars preserved next to the line near the site of the current station in August 2012

Originally scheduled to open on 1 August 2013, Tamboāto Station opened on 27 July 2013 at a cost of 31.2 million yen. Construction of the new station was funded entirely by the village of Inakadate.

Three former Konan Railway diesel cars, KiHa 2105, KiHa 2107, and KiHa 2230, were preserved next to the line for a number of years, painted in various bright colours, but these were due to cut up in November 2013 due to their poor condition.

== Surrounding area ==
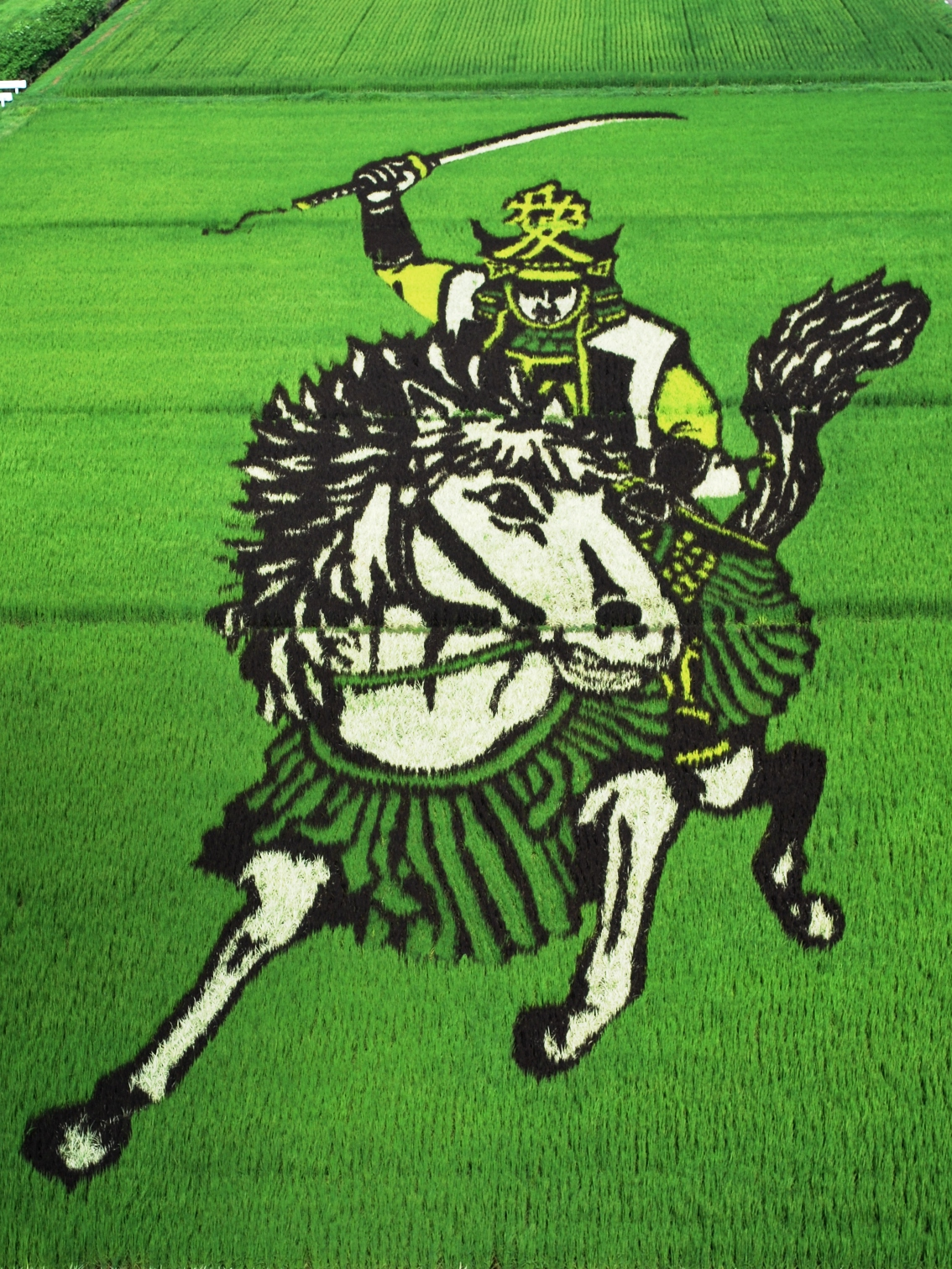
A rice paddy art creation in Inakadate

The station was built to provide access to the nearby rice paddies used for creating rice paddy art each year.

- Inakadate Relics Museum
- National Route 102

== See also ==
- List of railway stations in Japan
