= Inakadate Station =

Railway station in Inakadate, Aomori Prefecture, Japan

Inakadate Station 田舎館駅
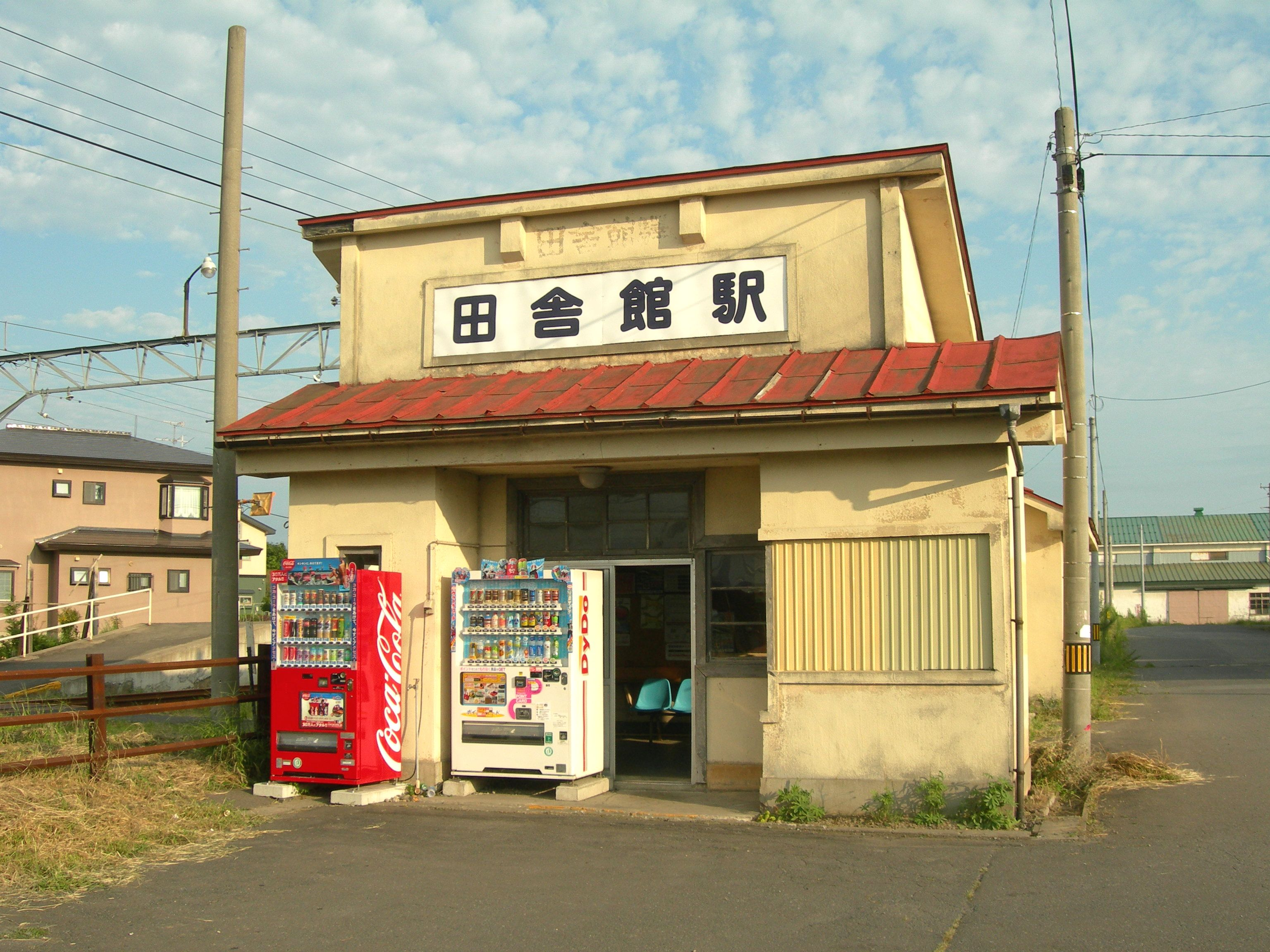
- Inakadate Station in August 2010

General information
- Location: 10-7 Takahi Fukayamabayashi, Inakadate-machi, Minamitsugaru-gun, Aomori-ken 038-1111; Japan
- Coordinates: 40°38′12.97″N 140°34′16.39″E
- Operator: Kōnan Railway
- Line: ■ Konan Railway Konan Line
- Distance: 13.8 km from Hirosaki
- Platforms: 1 island platform
- Tracks: 2

Other information
- Status: Unstaffed
- Website: Official website

History
- Opened: 1 July 1950

Passengers
- FY2011: 128 daily
Location
- Location within Aomori Prefecture Location within Japan

Inakadate Station (田舎館駅, Inakadate-eki) is a railway station on the Kōnan Railway Kōnan Line in the village of Inakadate, Minamitsugaru District, Aomori Prefecture, Japan, operated by the private railway operator Konan Railway.

== Lines ==
Inakadate Station is served by the 16.8 km Konan Railway Konan Line between Hirosaki and Kuroishi, and is located 13.8 km from the southern terminus of the line at Hirosaki.

== Station layout ==
The station has a single island platform serving two tracks connected to the station building by a level crossing. It is unattended.

=== Platforms ===
1	■ Konan Railway Konan Line	for Kuroishi
2	■ Konan Railway Konan Line	for Hirosaki

== Adjacent stations ==
«	Service	»
Konan Railway Konan Line
Tamboāto	Local	Sakaimatsu

== History ==
Inakadate Station opened on July 1, 1950. The station has been unattended since November 1, 1987.

== Passenger statistics ==
In fiscal 2011, the station was used by an average of 128 passengers daily.

== Surrounding area ==
- National Route 102

== See also ==
- List of railway stations in Japan
