= Hiraka Station =

Railway station in Hirakawa, Aomori Prefecture, Japan

Hiraka Station 平賀駅
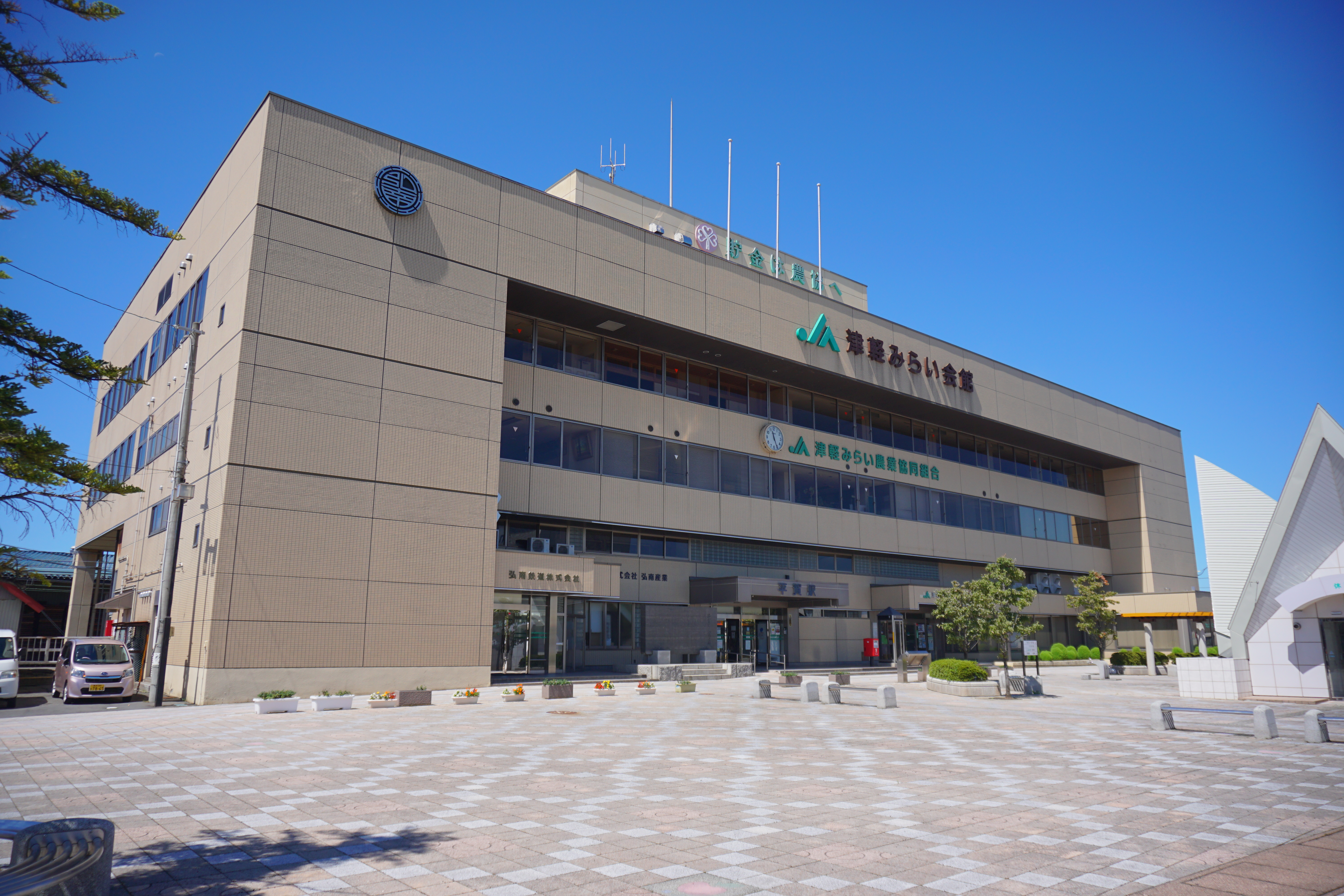
- Hiraka Station building, August 2022

General information
- Location: Motomachi Kitayanagida 23-5, Hirakawa-shi, Aomori-ken 036-0103; Japan
- Coordinates: 40°35′05.91″N 140°33′39.80″E
- Operator: Kōnan Railway
- Line: ■ Kōnan Line
- Distance: 7.5 km from Hirosaki
- Platforms: 1 island platform

Other information
- Status: Staffed
- Website: Official website (in Japanese)

History
- Opened: September 7, 1927

Passengers
- FY2015: 972
Location
- Location within Aomori Prefecture Location within Japan

Hiraka Station (平賀駅, Hiraka-eki) is a railway station in Hirakawa, Aomori, Japan, operated by the private railway operator Kōnan Railway Company.

== Lines ==
Hiraka Station is served by the Kōnan Railway Kōnan Line, and lies 7.5 kilometers from the northern terminus of the line at Hirosaki,

== Station layout ==
Hiraka Station has a two opposed side platforms with an elevated station building; however, one of the platforms has not been in use since the discontinuation of the Kuroishi Line in 1998. The station is staffed and also serves as the operational headquarters for the Kōnan Line.

=== Platforms ===
1	■ Kōnan Railway Kōnan Line	for Hirosaki and Kuroishi
2	■ Kōnan Railway Kōnan Line	(not in use)

== Adjacent stations ==
«	Service	»
Kōnan Railway Kōnan Line
Tachita	-	Hakunōkōkōmae

== History ==
Hiraka Station was opened on September 7, 1927. Freight operations were discontinued in 1984. Wicket gate operation was turned over to a separate company (kan'i itaku) in October 1985. A new station building was completed in December 1986. On June 12, 2007, an accident occurred at Hiraka Station when a Kuroishi-bound train derailed.

== Surrounding area ==
- former Hiraka Town Hall
- Hiraka Post Office

== See also ==
- List of railway stations in Japan
