= Hakunōkōkōmae Station =

Railway station in Hirakawa, Aomori Prefecture, Japan

Hakunōkōkōmae Station 柏農高校前駅
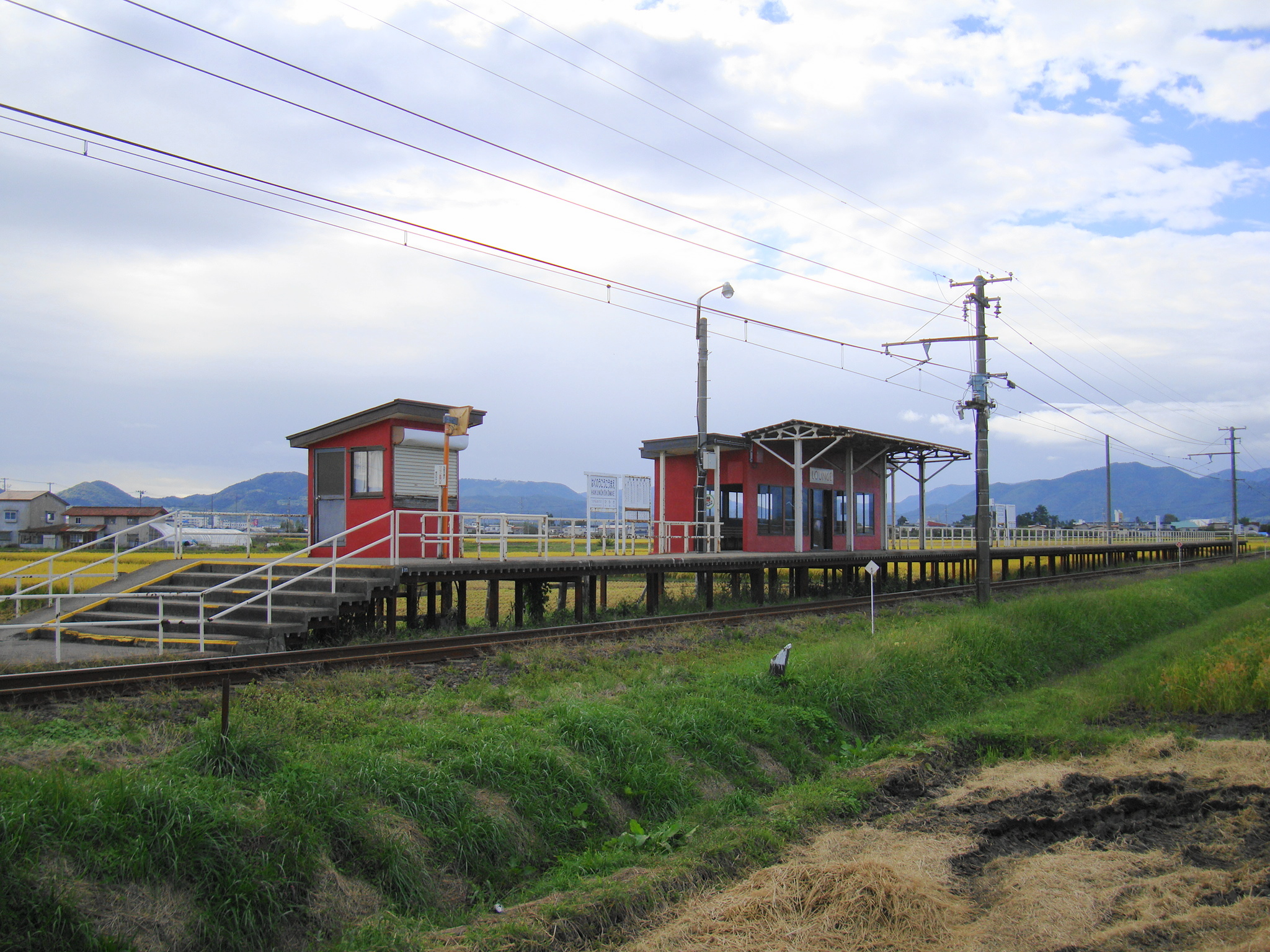
- Hakunōkōkōmae Station in September 2010

General information
- Location: 74-5 Arata Minamiokabe, Hirakawa-shi, Aomori-ken 036-0112; Japan
- Coordinates: 40°36′06.60″N 140°33′52.35″E
- Operator: Kōnan Railway
- Line: ■ Kōnan Line
- Distance: 9.5 km from Hirosaki
- Platforms: 1 side platform
- Tracks: 1

Other information
- Status: Unstaffed
- Website: Official website

History
- Opened: June 23, 1980
Location
- Location within Aomori Prefecture Location within Japan

Hakunōkōkōmae Station (柏農高校前駅, Hakunōkōkōmae-eki) is a railway station on the Kōnan Railway Kōnan Line in Hirakawa, Aomori, Japan, operated by the private railway operator Kōnan Railway Company.

== Lines ==
Hakunōkōkōmae Station is served by the Kōnan Railway Kōnan Line, and lies 9.5 kilometers from the northern terminus of the line at Hirosaki.

== Station layout ==
Hakunōkōkōmae Station has a one side platform serving a single bi-directional track. The station is unattended.

== Adjacent stations ==
«	Service	»
Kōnan Railway Kōnan Line
Hiraka	-	Tsugaru-Onoe

== History ==
Hakunōkōkōmae Station was opened on June 23, 1980, primarily to serve the local Prefectural Hirakawa Agricultural High School.

== Surrounding area ==
- Prefectural Hirakawa Agricultural High School.

== See also ==
- List of railway stations in Japan
