= Tsugaru-Onoe Station =

Railway station in Hirakawa, Aomori Prefecture, Japan

Tsugaru-Onoe Station 津軽尾上駅
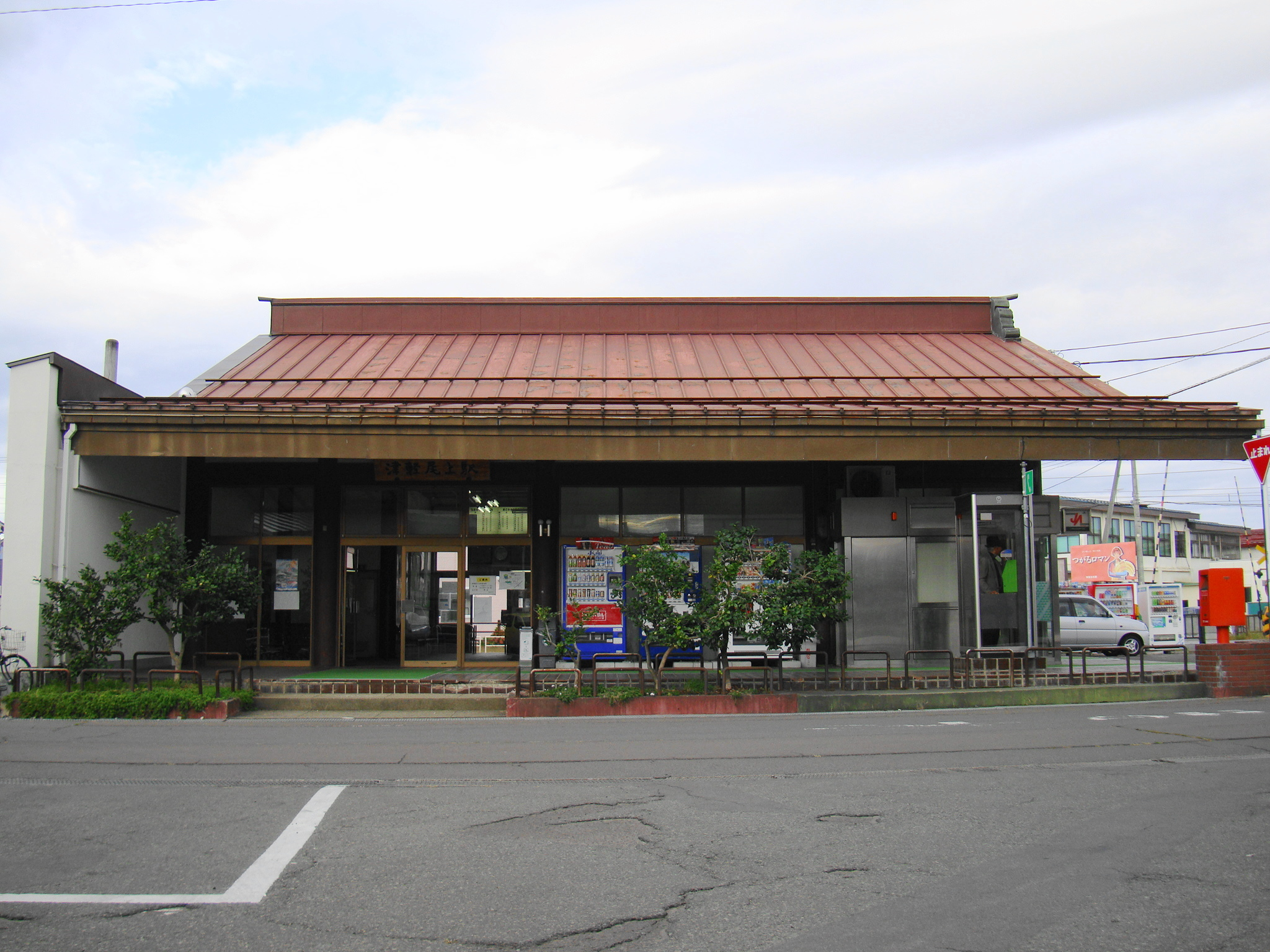
- Tsugaru-Onoe Station in September 2010

General information
- Location: 9-7 Nakasado Minamida, Hirakawa-shi, Aomori-ken 036-0221; Japan
- Coordinates: 40°36′50.83″N 140°34′35.53″E
- Operator: Kōnan Railway
- Line: ■ Kōnan Line
- Distance: 11.1 km from Hirosaki
- Platforms: 1 island platform
- Tracks: 2

Other information
- Status: Staffed
- Website: Official website

History
- Opened: September 7, 1927
- Rebuilt: 1979
Location
- Location within Aomori Prefecture Location within Japan

Tsugaru-Onoe Station (津軽尾上駅, Tsugaru-Onoe-eki) is a railway station on the Kōnan Railway Kōnan Line in Hirakawa, Aomori, Japan, operated by the private railway operator Kōnan Railway Company.

== Lines ==
Tsugaru-Onoe Station is served by the Kōnan Railway Kōnan Line, and lies 11.1 kilometers from the northern terminus of the line at Hirosaki.

== Station layout ==
Tsugaru-Onoe Station has a one island platform. The station building is connected to the platform by a level crossing and is staffed.

=== Platforms ===
1	■ Kōnan Railway Kōnan Line	for Hirosaki
2	■ Kōnan Railway Kōnan Line	for Kuroishi

== Adjacent stations ==
«	Service	»
Kōnan Railway Kōnan Line
Hakunōkōkōmae	-	Onoekōkōmae

== History ==
Tsugaru-Onoe Station was opened on September 1, 1927. Freight operations were discontinued in 1979. A new station building was completed in September 1979.

The station has been operated as a kan'i itaku station since October 1980.[citation needed]

== Surrounding area ==
- Hirakawa city office Onoe branch
- Onoe Post Office
- Aomori Bank Onoe branch

== See also ==
- List of railway stations in Japan
