= Undōkōenmae Station (Aomori) =

Railway station in Hirosaki, Aomori Prefecture, Japan

Undōkōenmae Station 運動公園前駅
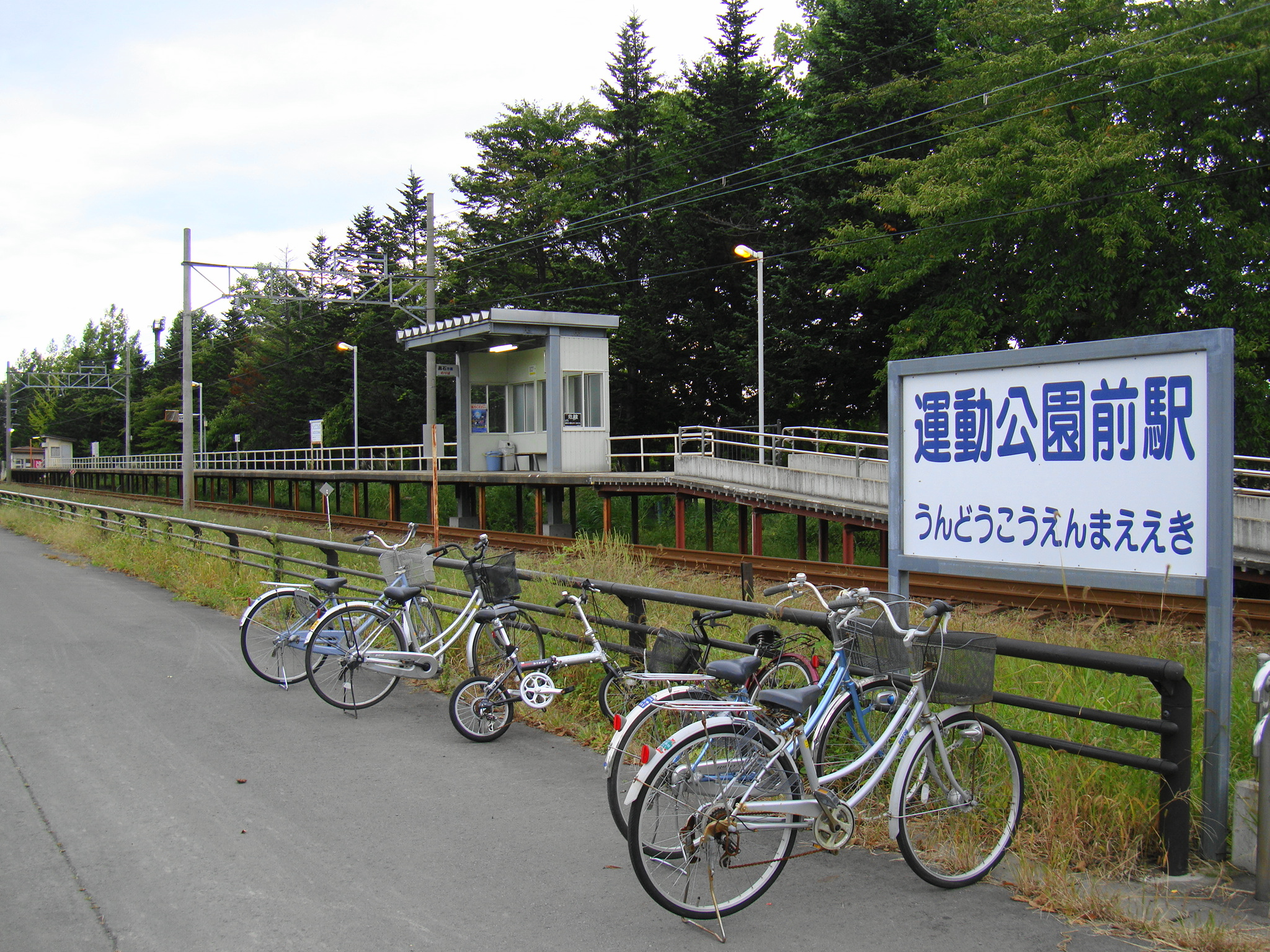
- Undōkōenmae Station in September 2010

General information
- Location: Tomita 91-3, Hirosak-shii, Aomori-ken 036-8101; Japan
- Coordinates: 40°35′22.64″N 140°30′8.38″E
- Operator: Kōnan Railway
- Line: ■ Kōnan Line
- Distance: 2.1 km from Hirosaki
- Platforms: 1 side platform

Other information
- Status: Unstaffed
- Website: Official website (in Japanese)

History
- Opened: September 10, 1977

Passengers
- FY2015: 200
Location
- Location within Aomori Prefecture Location within Japan

Undōkōenmae Station (運動公園前駅, Undōkōenmae-eki) is a railway station in the city of Hirosaki, Aomori, Japan, operated by the private railway operator Kōnan Railway Company.

== Lines ==
Undōkōenmae Station is served by the Kōnan Railway Kōnan Line, and lies 2.1 kilometers from the northern terminus of the line at Hirosaki,

== Station layout ==
Undōkōenmae Station has a one side platform serving a single bi-directional track. The station building is unattended.

== Adjacent stations ==
«	Service	»
Kōnan Railway Kōnan Line
Hirosaki-Higashikōmae	-	Nisato

== History ==
The station opened on September 10, 1977.

== Surrounding area ==
- Hirosaki Athletic Park and Sports Recreation Centre

== See also ==
- List of railway stations in Japan
