= Chūō-Hirosaki Station =

Railway station in Hirosaki, Aomori Prefecture, Japan

Chūō-Hirosaki Station 中央弘前駅
- Chūō-Hirosaki Station, May 2026

General information
- Location: Yoshino-cho 1-6, Hirosaki-shi, Aomori-ken 036-8188; Japan
- Coordinates: 40°35′58.61″N 140°28′21.71″E
- Operator: Kōnan Railway
- Line: ■ Ōwani Line
- Distance: 13.9 km from Ōwani
- Platforms: 1 side platform

Other information
- Status: Staffed
- Website: Official website (in Japanese)

History
- Opened: January 26, 1952

Passengers
- FY2015: 737
Location
- Location within Aomori Prefecture Location within Japan

Chūō-Hirosaki Station (中央弘前駅, Chūō-Hirosaki-eki) is a railway station in the city of Hirosaki, Aomori Prefecture, Japan, operated by the private railway operator, Kōnan Railway Company.

== Lines ==
Chūō-Hirosaki Station is the northern terminal of the Kōnan Railway Ōwani Line, and lies 13.9 kilometers from the southern terminus of the line at Ōwani Station.

== Station layout ==
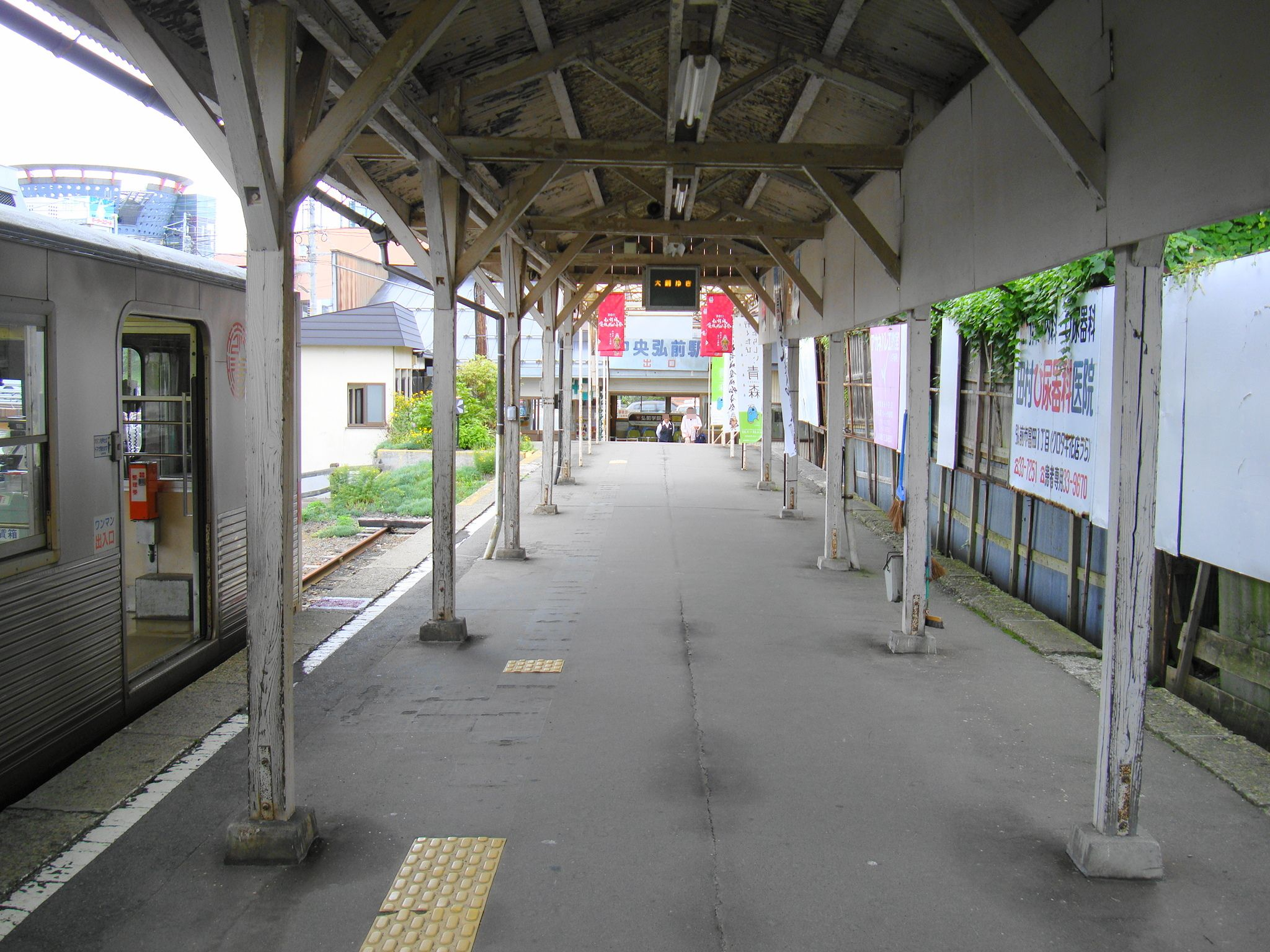
Chūōhirosaki Station

Chūō-Hirosaki Station has one deadheaded side platform serving a single track. The small station building houses an izakaya-style soba restaurant.

== Adjacent stations ==
«	Service	»
Kōnan Railway Kōnan Line
Hirokōshita	-	Terminus

== History ==
Chūō-Hirosaki Station was opened on January 26, 1952. From April 1, 1997 it has been a kan'i itaku station, run by a group of retired employees from the Kōnan Railway Company.

== Surrounding area ==
- downtown central Hirosaki

== See also ==
- List of railway stations in Japan
