= Kawabe Station (Aomori) =

Railway station in Inakadate, Aomori Prefecture, Japan

Kawabe Station 川部駅
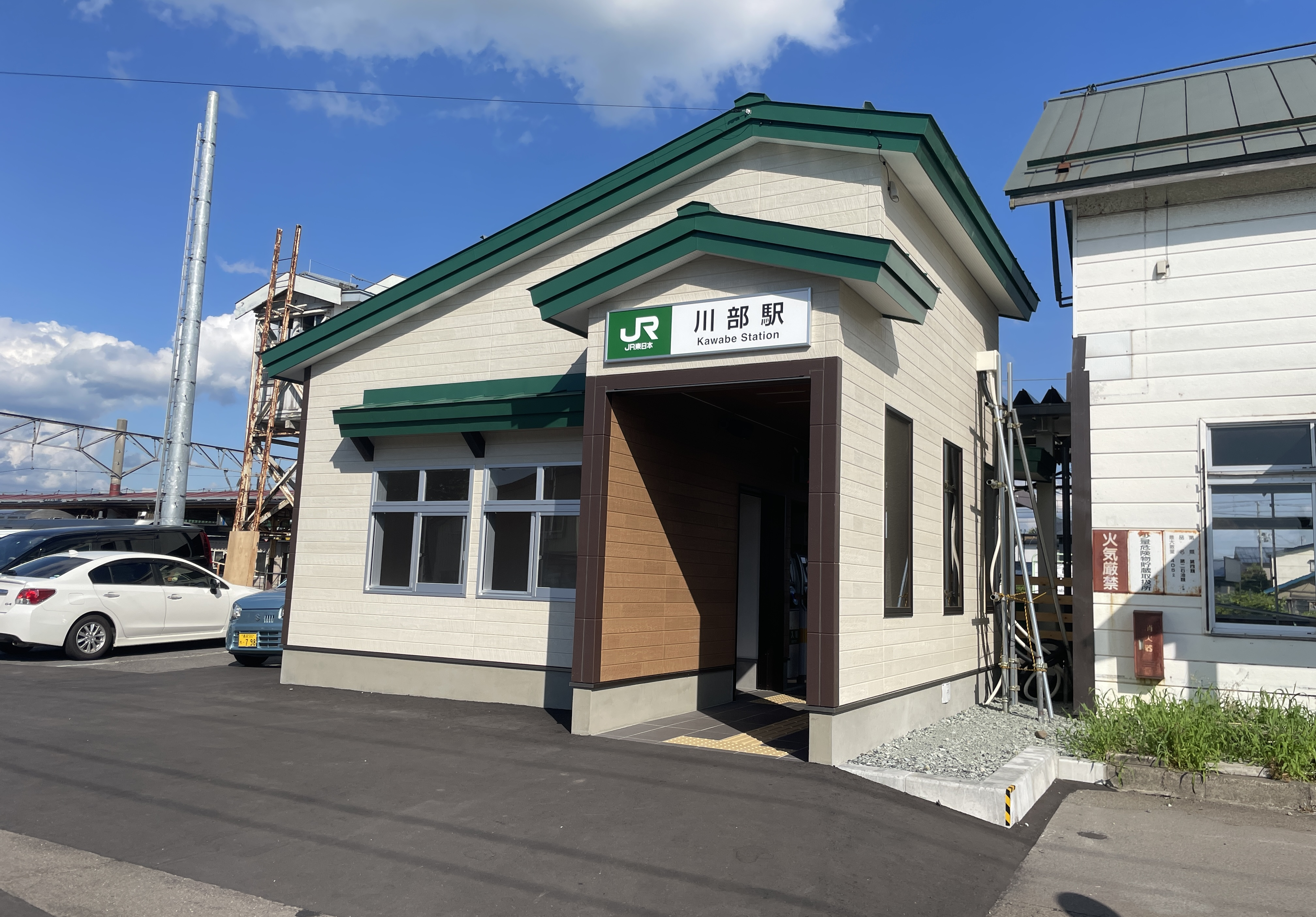
- Kawabe Station in August 2023

General information
- Location: 31-2 Kami-Nishida, Kawabe, Inakadate-mura, Minamitsugaru-gun, Aomori-ken 038-1141; Japan
- Coordinates: 40°38′47.82″N 140°31′15.32″E
- Operator: JR East
- Lines: ■ Ōu Main Line; ■ Gonō Line
- Distance: 453.4 km from Fukushima
- Platforms: 2 island platforms
- Tracks: 3

Other information
- Status: Unstaffed station
- Website: www.jreast.co.jp/estation/station/info.aspx?StationCd=534

History
- Opened: 1 December 1894

Passengers
- FY2018: 285 daily

Services
Preceding station	JR East	Following station
Hirosaki towards Akita	Ōu Main Line Rapid	Kita-Tokiwa towards Aomori
Naijōshi towards Shinjō	Ōu Main Line Local	Kita-Tokiwa towards Aomori
Fujisaki towards Higashi-Noshiro	Gonō Line Rapid	Naijōshi One-way operation
Fujisaki towards Higashi-Noshiro	Gonō Line Local	Naijōshi towards Hirosaki
Location
- Location within Aomori Prefecture Location within Japan

Kawabe Station (川部駅, Kawabe-eki) is a railway station on the Ōu Main Line and Gonō Line in the village of Inakadate, Aomori Prefecture, Japan, operated by East Japan Railway Company (JR East).

== Lines ==
Kawabe Station is served by the Ōu Main Line, and is 453.4 kilometers from the southern terminus of the line at Fukushima. It is also the northern terminal station for the Gonō Line.

== Station layout ==
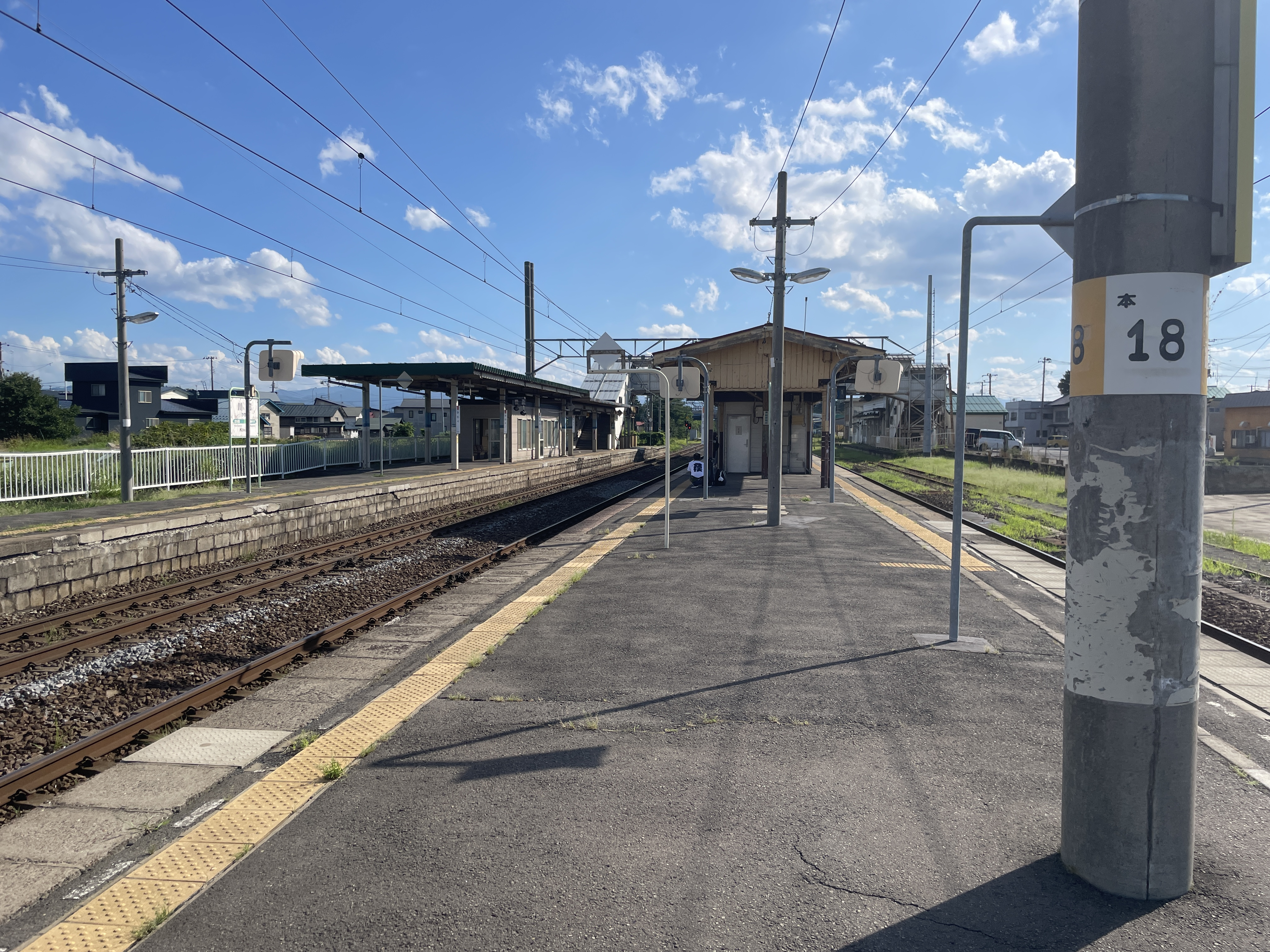
Platform in August, 2023

Kawabe Station has two ground level island platforms, serving three tracks, connected to the station building by a footbridge. The station has been unstaffed since March 18, 2023. A fourth track has not been in use since April 1, 1998 with the discontinuation of the Kuroishi Line.

=== Platforms ===
1	■ Gonō Line	for Goshogawara and Ajigasawa
1	■ Ōu Main Line	for Hirosaki
2	■ Ōu Main Line	for Namioka and Aomori
3	■ Ōu Main Line	for Hirosaki and Akita
3	■ Gonō Line	for Goshogawara and Ajigasawa

== History ==
Kawabe Station opened on December 1, 1894, as a station on the Japanese Government Railways, the predecessor to the Japanese National Railways (JNR) on the Ōu Northern Line. From August 15, 1912, a spur line opened to Kuroishi, and from September 25, 1918, the Mutsu Railway (present-day Gonō Line) began operations from Kawabe Station. On November 1, 1984, operations on the Kuroishi Line were transferred from JNR to the Konan Railway. All freight operations were discontinued from April 1987. With the privatization of JNR on April 1, 1987, it came under the operational control of JR East. The Kuroishi Line ceased operations from April 1, 1998.

== Passenger statistics ==
In fiscal 2018, the station was used by an average of 285 passengers daily (boarding passengers only).

== Surrounding area ==
- Kawabe-Izumi Post office

== Bus services ==
Kōnan Bus services for Kuroishi Station via Maeda-Yashiki.

== See also ==
- List of railway stations in Japan
