= Hirosaki-Higashikōmae Station =

Railway station in Hirosaki, Aomori Prefecture, Japan

Hirosaki-Higashikōmae Station 弘前東高前駅
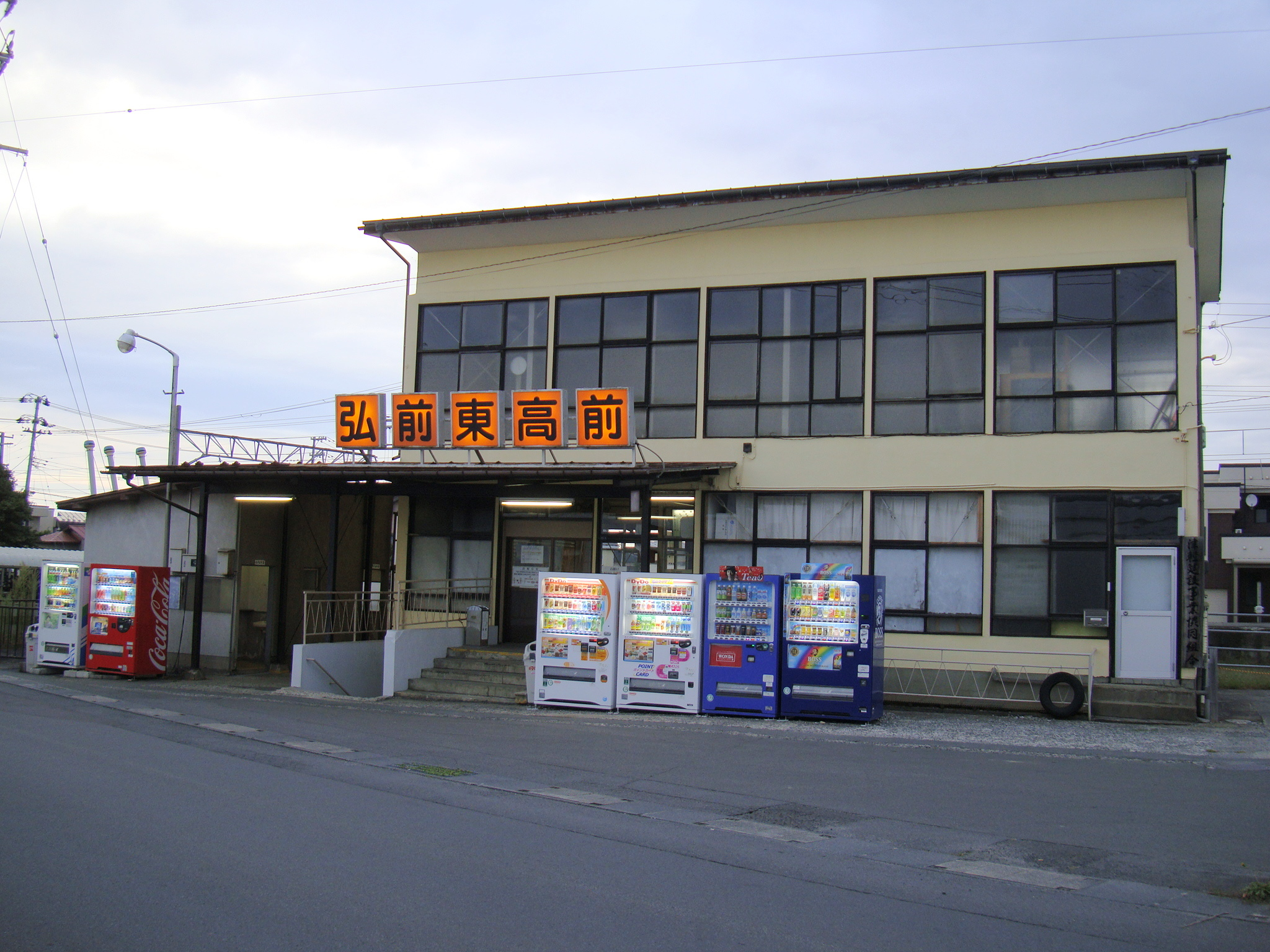
- Hirosaki-Higashikōmae Station, September 2010

General information
- Location: 4-11-1 Kawasaki, Hirosaki-shi, Aomori-len 036-8103; Japan
- Coordinates: 40°35′32.39″N 140°29′17.78″E
- Operator: Kōnan Railway
- Line: ■ Kōnan Line
- Distance: 0.9 km from Hirosaki
- Platforms: 1 side platform

Other information
- Status: Staffed
- Website: Official website (in Japanese)

History
- Opened: March 18, 1929
- Former names: Higashi-Kōgyōkōmae (until 2005)

Passengers
- FY2015: 331
Location
- Location within Aomori Prefecture Location within Japan

Hirosaki-Higashikōmae Station (弘前東高前駅, Hirosakihigashikōmae-eki) is a railway station in the city of Hirosaki, Aomori, Japan, operated by the private railway operator Kōnan Railway Company.

== Lines ==
Hirosaki-Higashikōmae Station is served by the Kōnan Railway Kōnan Line, and lies 0.9 kilometers from the northern terminus of the line at Hirosaki,

== Station layout ==
Hirosaki-Higashikōmae Station has a one side platform serving a single bi-directional track. The station building is attended during normal working hours.

== Adjacent stations ==
«	Service	»
Kōnan Railway Kōnan Line
Hirosaki	-	Undōkōenmae

== History ==
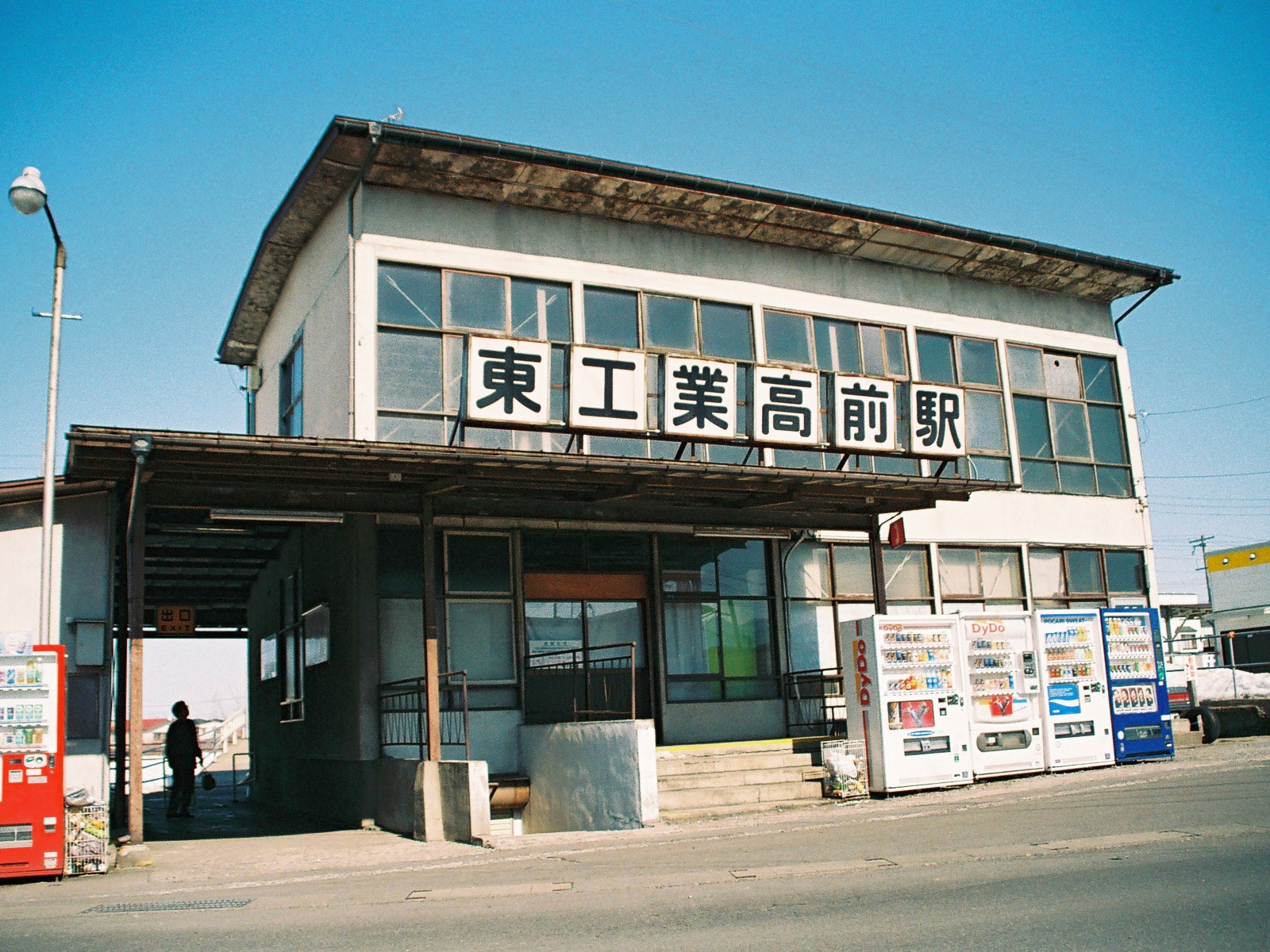
The station as named Higashi-Kōgyōkōmae, March 2003

The station opened on September 7, 1927, initially as a simple stop named Matsumori-chō Stop (松森町停留所). It became a full station from March 18, 1929, and renamed Minami-Hirosaki Station (南弘前駅) on June 17 of the same year. On April 1, 1988, the station was renamed Higashi-Kōgyōkōmae Station (東工業高前駅), and it was renamed Hirosaki-Higashikōmae Station on April 1, 2005.

== Surrounding area ==
- Hirosaki-Higashi High School
- Hirosaki Athletic Park and Sports Recreation Centre

== See also ==
- List of railway stations in Japan
