= Kōnan Railway Kuroishi Line =

Kuroishi Line
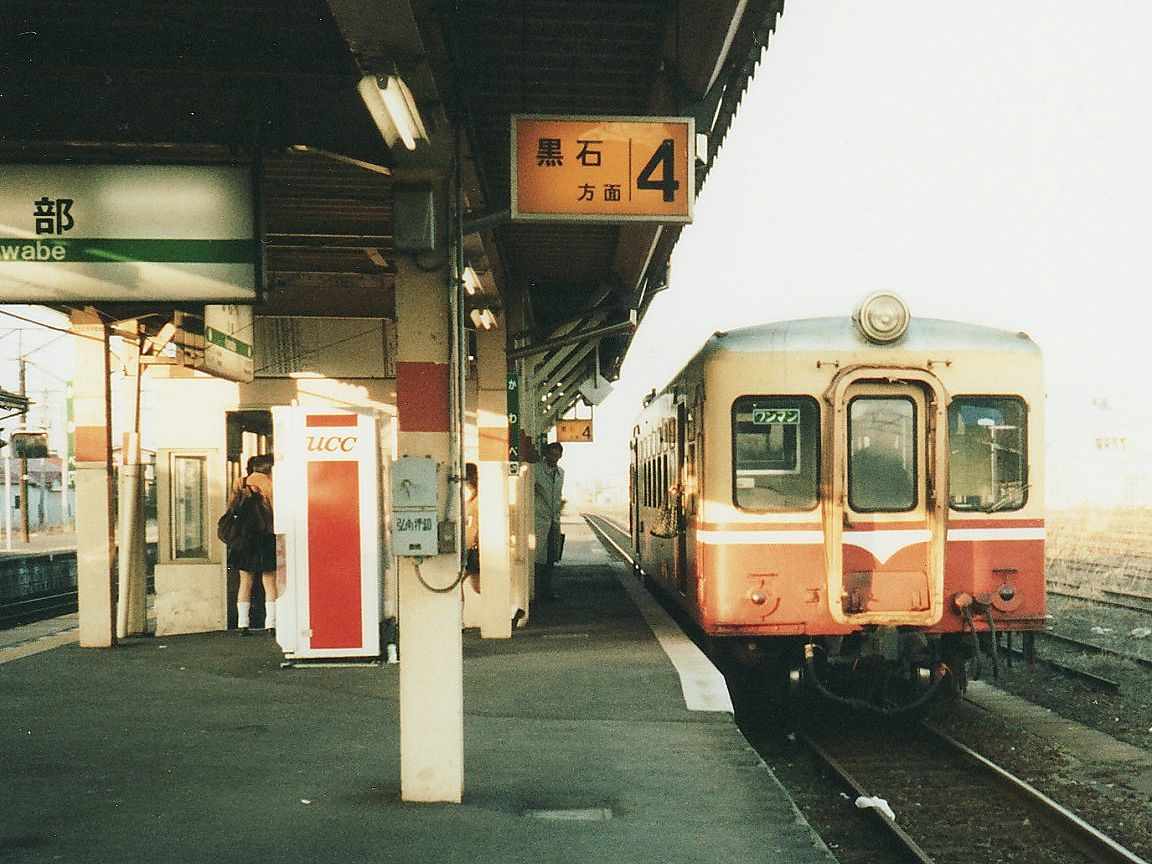
- Kawabe Station (1997)

Overview
- Native name: 黒石線
- Status: Ceased operation
- Owner: Kōnan Railway
- Locale: Aomori
- Termini: Kawabe; Kuroishi
- Stations: 3

Service
- Type: Commuter rail line
- Operator(s): Kōnan Railway

History
- Opened: 15 August 1912; 113 years ago
- Closed: 1 April 1998

Technical
- Line length: 6.2 km (3.9 mi)
- Number of tracks: Entirely Single-tracked
- Character: Rural and urban
- Track gauge: 1,067 mm (3 ft 6 in)
- Electrification: None

The Kuroishi Line (黒石線, Kuroishi-sen) was a rail line of a Japanese minor private railway, Kōnan Railway in Aomori Prefecture, from Kawabe Station in Inakadate to Kuroishi Station in Kuroishi. Originally the line was opened as Kuroishi Light railway (黒石軽便線, Kuroishi-keiben-sen) in 1912, merged to Kōnan Railway in 1984, and closed in 1998.

== History ==
The line was initially constructed by Ministry of Railways as Kuroishi Light railway line in August 1912. The phrase "Light railway" was removed from the name of the line in 1922. The line suffered from the decrease in passengers due to the opening of the Kōnan Railway Kōnan Line in 1950. In 1968, the Kōnan Railway offered to take over the operation of the line. The line was listed in the 1st phase of Specified local lines due to low passengers, and it was transferred to Konan Railway on 1984. However, through services through the Gonō Line were abolished, and overall fares were raised when the line was transferred which resulted in further decline in usage. The line closed in 1998 due to the lack of users, and the line was turned into a bus route operated by the name company.

== Route data ==
- Kōnan Railway Company
- Total distance: 6.2 km (Kawabe - Kuroishi) (6.6 km before 1984)
- Rail Gauge: 1067mm
- Stations: 3
- Tracks: Single-track
- Electrification: None
- Block system: Automatic block system

== Station list ==
| Name | | Distance (km) | Connections | Location |
|---|---|---|---|---|
| Kawabe | 川部 | 0.0 | ■ Ōu Main Line ■ Gonō Line | Minamitsugaru District, Inakadate |
| Maedayashiki | 前田屋敷 | 2.9 | | Minamitsugaru District, Inakadate |
| Kuroishi | 黒石 | 6.2 | ■ Kōnan Line | Kuroishi, Aomori |

- i
