= Ishikawa Station (JR East) =

Railway station in Hirosaki, Aomori Prefecture, Japan

Ishikawa Station 石川駅
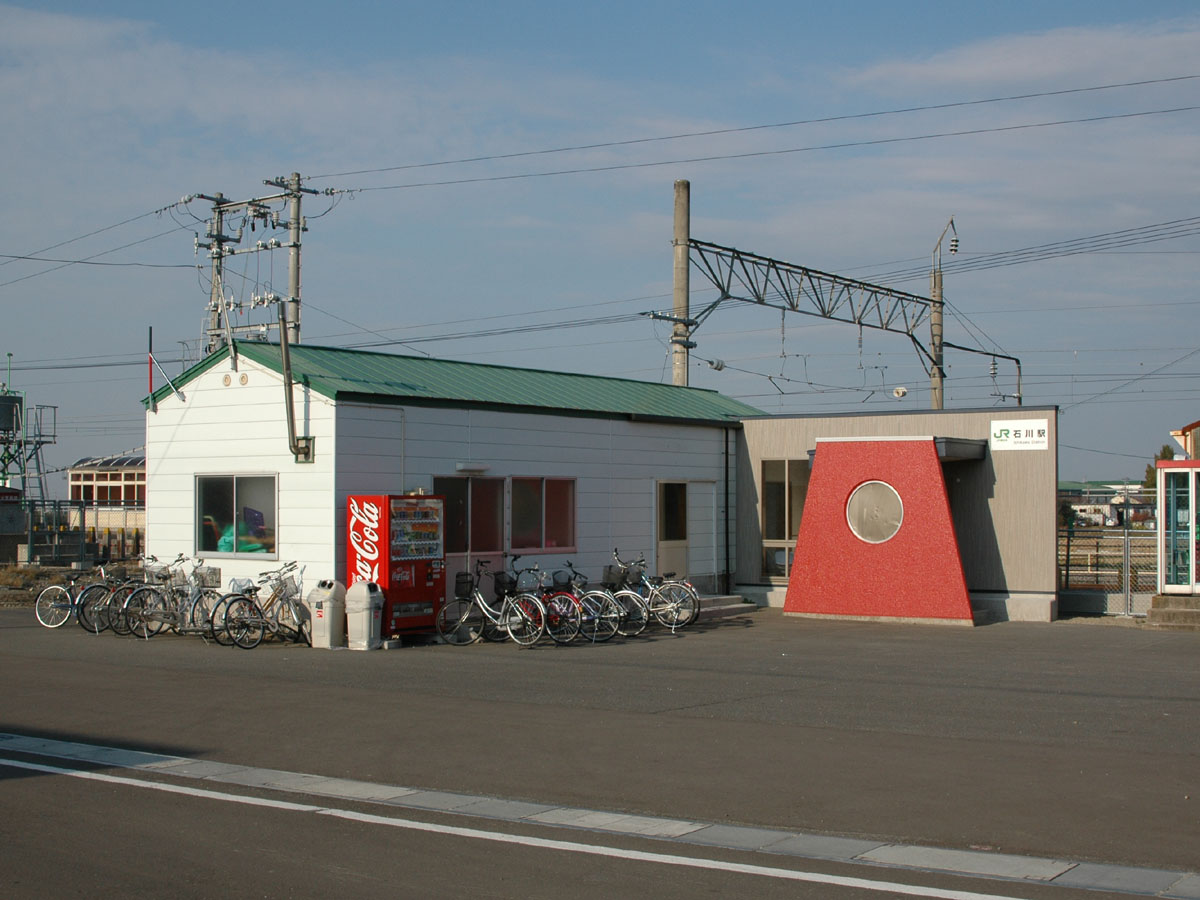
- Ishikawa Station in November 2006

General information
- Location: Ishikawa Nozaki 25, Hirosaki-shi, Aomori-ken 036-8124; Japan
- Coordinates: 40°33′19.92″N 140°31′52.41″E
- Operator: JR East
- Line: ■ Ōu Main Line
- Distance: 440.7 km from Fukushima
- Platforms: 1 side +1 island platform

Other information
- Status: Unstaffed
- Website: Official website

History
- Opened: July 7, 1916

Services
Preceding station	JR East	Following station
Ōwani-Onsen towards Shinjō	Ōu Main Line Local	Hirosaki towards Aomori
Location
- Location within Aomori Prefecture Location within Japan

Ishikawa Station (石川駅, Ishikawa-eki) is a railway station located in the city of Hirosaki, Aomori Prefecture, Japan, operated by East Japan Railway Company (JR East).

== Lines ==
Ishikawa Station is served by the Ōu Main Line, and is 440.7 kilometers from the southern terminus of the line at Fukushima.

== Station layout ==
Ishikawa Station has one ground level side platform and one ground-level island platform, connected to the station building by a level crossing. The station is unattended.

=== Platforms ===
1	■ Ōu Main Line	for Hirosaki and Aomori
2, 3	■ Ōu Main Line	for Ōdate and Akita

== History ==
Ishikawa Station was opened on July 7, 1916 as a station on the Japanese Government Railways (JGR). The JGR became the Japan National Railways (JNR) after World War II. With the privatization of the JNR on April 1, 1987, the station came under the operational control of JR East.

== Surrounding area ==
- Ishikawa Post Office
- Gijukukōkōmae Station on the Kōnan Railway Ōwani Line

== See also ==
- List of railway stations in Japan
