= Kōnan Bus Company =

Bus company in Japan

Kōnan Bus Company 弘南バス株式会社
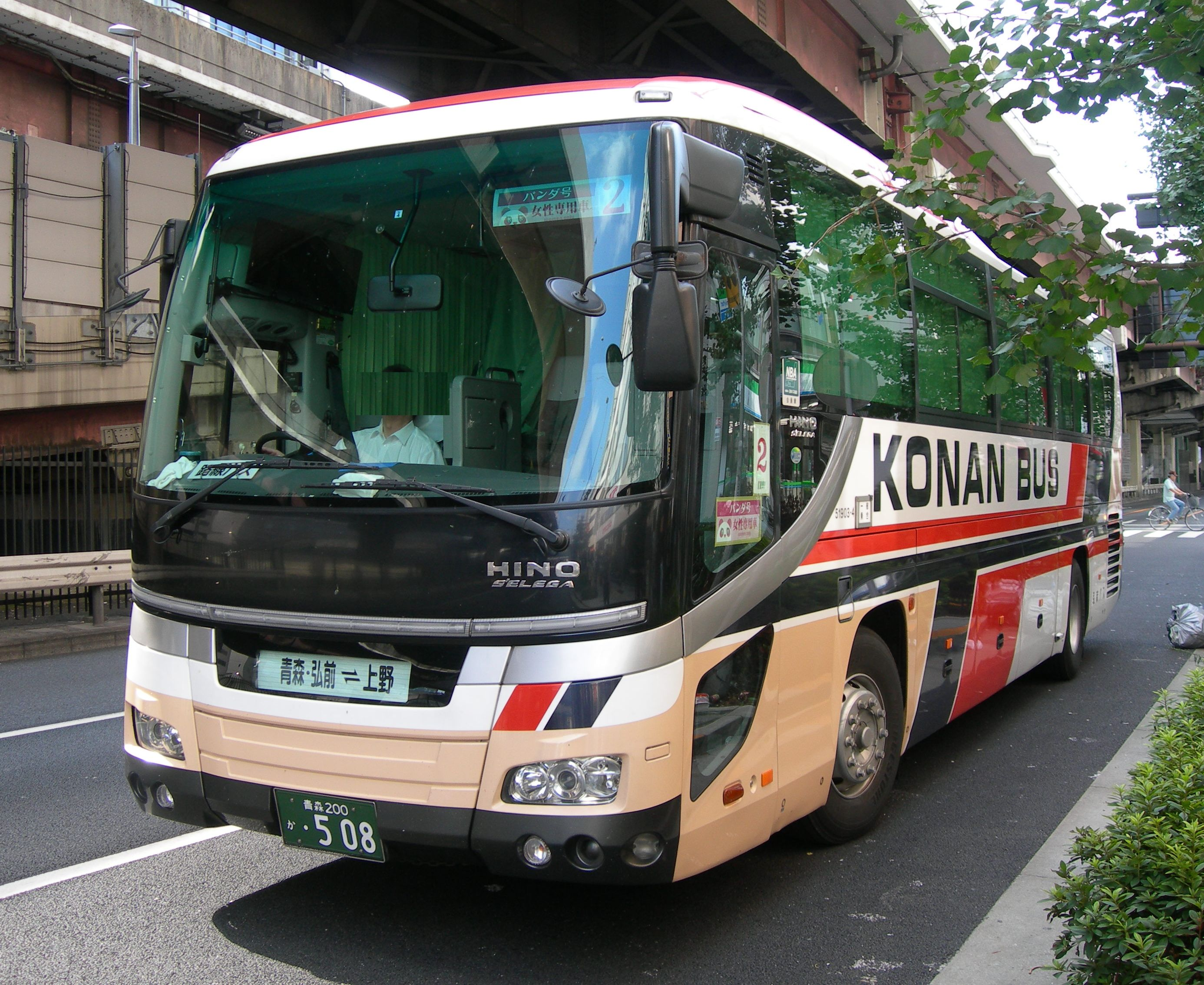
- Type: Kabushiki kaisha
- Industry: Public transportation
- Founded: April 17, 1941
- Headquarters: Hirosaki, Aomori Prefecture, Japan
- Parent: Nagoya Railroad
- Website: http://www.konanbus.com/

Kōnan Bus Company (弘南バス株式会社, Kōnan Bus Kabushiki-gaisha) is a bus company in Japan.

== Office ==
=== Bus garage ===
- Hirosaki Bus office (Hirosaki)
  - Wattoku Branch office (Hirosaki)
  - Fujishiro Branch office (Hirosaki)
- Kuroishi Bus office (Kuroishi)
- Goshogawara Bus office (Goshogawara)
  - Kodomari Branch office (Nakadomari)
- Ajigasawa Bus office (Ajigasawa)
- Aomori Bus office (Aomori)

=== Bus information desk ===
The bus information desk sell a commuter pass and a coupon.

- Hirosaki Bus terminal
- Hirosaki Station Information desk
- Ōwani Branch office Information desk
- Kuroishi Station Information desk
- Goshogawara Station Information desk (Goshogawara Bus terminal)
- Goshogawara Bus office Information desk
- Kodomari Branch office Information desk
- Ajigasawa Station Information desk
- Aomori Information center
- Aomori Bus office Information desk

== Lines ==
=== Highway bus ===
- Nocturne (ノクターン) (Goshogawara / Hirosaki - Hamamatsucho / Shinagawa / Yokohama)
- Tsugaru (津輕号) (Aomori - Tokyo)
- Panda (パンダ) (Aomori / Hirosaki - Ueno)
- Sky (スカイ号) (Aomori / Hirosaki - Ueno)
- Castle (キャッスル) (Hirosaki - Sendai)
- Blue City (ブルーシティ) (Sendai - Aomori)
- Yodel (ヨーデル) (Hirosaki - Morioka)
- Asunaro (あすなろ) (Aomori - Morioka)

=== Route bus ===
- Hirosaki - Fujisaki - Itayanagi - Turuta - Goshogawara
- Hirosaki - Fujisaki - Namioka
- Hirosaki - Inakadate - Kuroishi
- Hirosaki - Onoe
- Hirosaki - Senseji - Itayanagi - Tokoshinai
- Hirosaki - Hamanomachi - Tokoshinai - Ajigasawa
- Hirosaki - Ōwani - Ikarigaseki
- Kuroishi - Namioka - Aomori
- Kuroishi - Nijinoko - Nuruyu
- Goshogawara - Aomori
- Goshogawara - Kizukuri - Morita - Ajigasawa
- Goshogawara - Kanagi - Nakatato - Aiuchi - Kodomari
- Goshogawara - Kizukuri - Shariki - Jyūsan - Kodomari
- Ajigasawa - Fukaura
