= Kōnan Railway Kōnan Line =

Railway line in Aomori prefecture, Japan

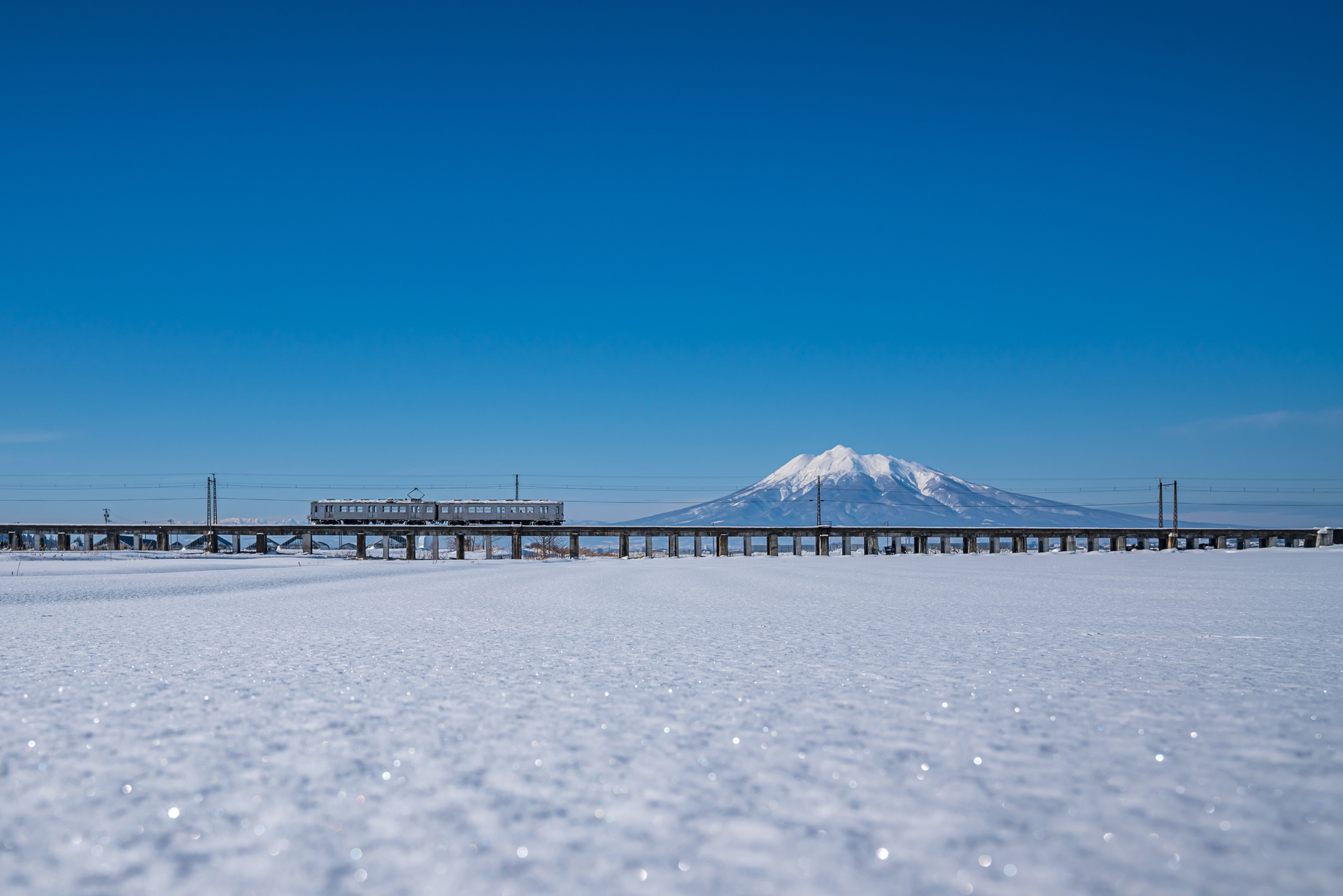
- Kōnan Line train and Mount Iwaki in January 2021

Overview
- Native name: 弘南線
- Status: Operational
- Owner: Kōnan Railway Company
- Locale: Aomori Prefecture
- Termini: Hirosaki; Kuroishi
- Stations: 13

Service
- Type: Heavy rail passenger

History
- Opened: 7 September 1927; 99 years ago

Technical
- Line length: 16.8 km (10.4 mi)
- Number of tracks: 1
- Track gauge: 1,067 mm (3 ft 6 in)
- Minimum radius: 240 m
- Electrification: 1,500 V DC with Overhead catenary
- Operating speed: 65 km/h (40 mph)

The Kōnan Line (弘南線, Kōnan-sen) is a railway route operated by the Japanese private railway operator Kōnan Railway in Aomori Prefecture, from Hirosaki Station in Hirosaki to Kuroishi Station in Kuroishi.

== Station list ==
No.	Station	Japanese	Distance (km)		Transfers	Location
No.	Station	Japanese	Between stations	Total	Transfers	Location
KK01	Hirosaki	弘前	-	0.0	■ Ou Main Line ■ Gono Line	Hirosaki
KK02	Hirosaki-Higashikōmae	弘前東高前	0.9	0.9		Hirosaki
KK03	Undōkōenmae	運動公園前	1.2	2.1		Hirosaki
KK04	Nisato	新里	1.5	3.6		Hirosaki
KK05	Tachita	館田	1.6	5.2		Hirakawa
KK06	Hiraka	平賀	2.3	7.5		Hirakawa
KK07	Hakunōkōkōmae	柏農高校前	2.0	9.5		Hirakawa
KK08	Tsugaru-Onoe	津軽尾上	1.6	11.1		Hirakawa
KK09	Onoekōkōmae	尾上高校前	1.4	12.5		Hirakawa
KK10	Tamboāto*	田んぼアート	0.9	13.4		Inakadate, Minamitsugaru District
KK11	Inakadate	田舎館	0.4	13.8		Inakadate, Minamitsugaru District
KK12	Sakaimatsu	境松	1.5	15.3		Kuroishi
KK13	Kuroishi	黒石	1.5	16.8		Kuroishi

- Tamboāto Station is open from April to November only.

== Rolling stock ==
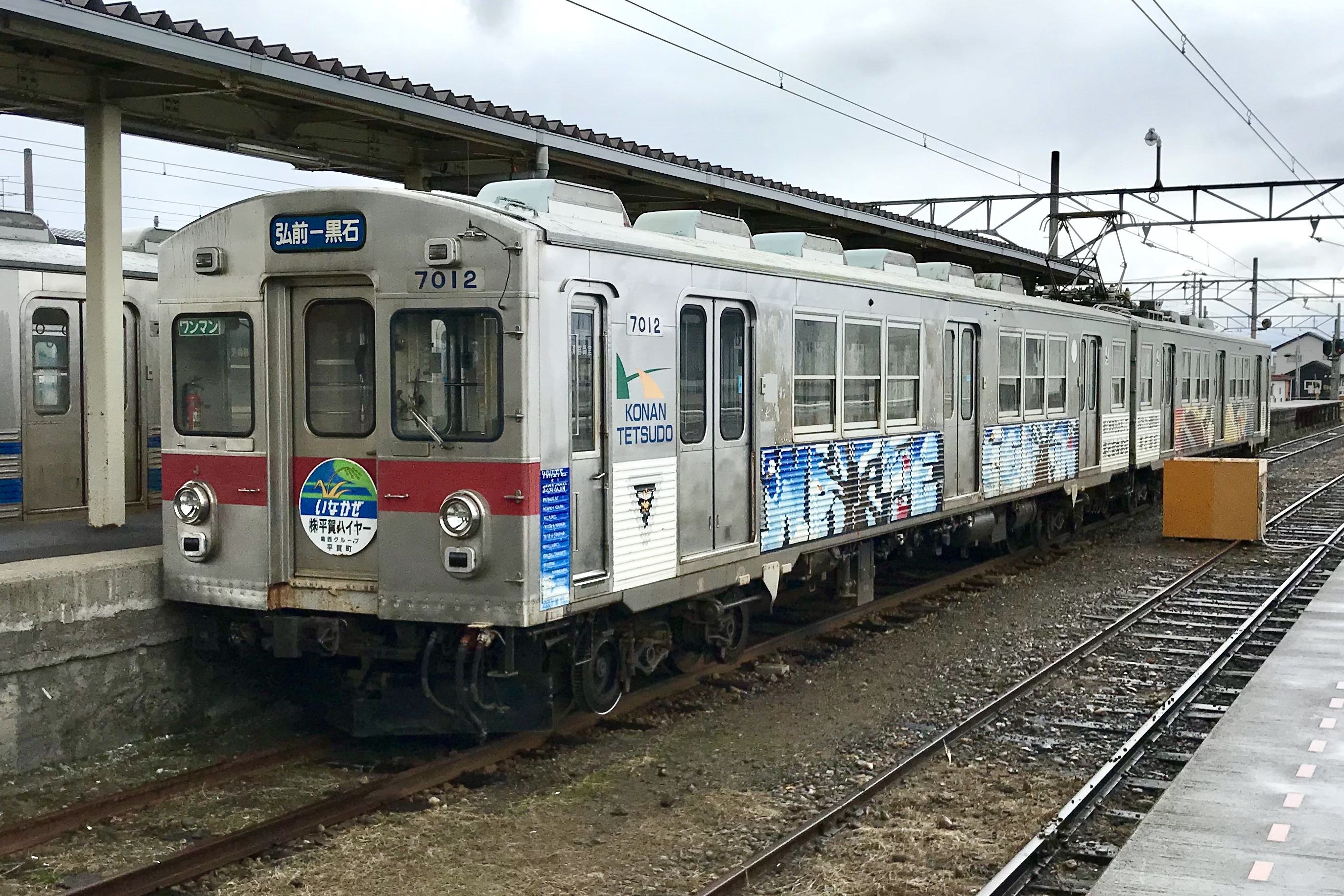
A Konan 7000 series EMU at Kuroishi Station

Rolling stock on the line consists of former Tokyu 6000 and 7000 series EMUs. Ex-Nankai Railway 1521 series 4-door EMUs were also previously used, but these were withdrawn in 2008 following the discontinuation of limited-stop "Rapid" services. An electric locomotive is also available for use on winter snow-clearing duties.

== History ==
The Kōnan Railway was founded on March 27, 1926, and began operations between Hirosaki and Tsugaru-Onoe Station on September 7, 1927. On July 1, 1948, the line was electrified at 600 volts DC. The line was extended to Kōnan-Kuroishi Station (present-day Kuroishi Station) on July 1, 1950. Voltage on the line was raised to 750 volts on April 1, 1954, and to 1,500 volts on September 1, 1961.

Freight services ceased in 1984.

=== Former connecting lines ===
- Kuroishi station - The 7 km (4.3 mi) line to Kawabe on the Ou Main Line was opened in 1912 by the JGR, transferred to the Konan Railway Co. in 1984, the year that freight services ceased, and closed in 1998.

== Accidents ==
A train derailed at Hiraka Station on June 12, 2007, but no injuries were reported.
