= Kuroishi Station (Aomori) =

Railway station in Kuroishi, Aomori Prefecture, Japan

Kuroishi Station 黒石駅
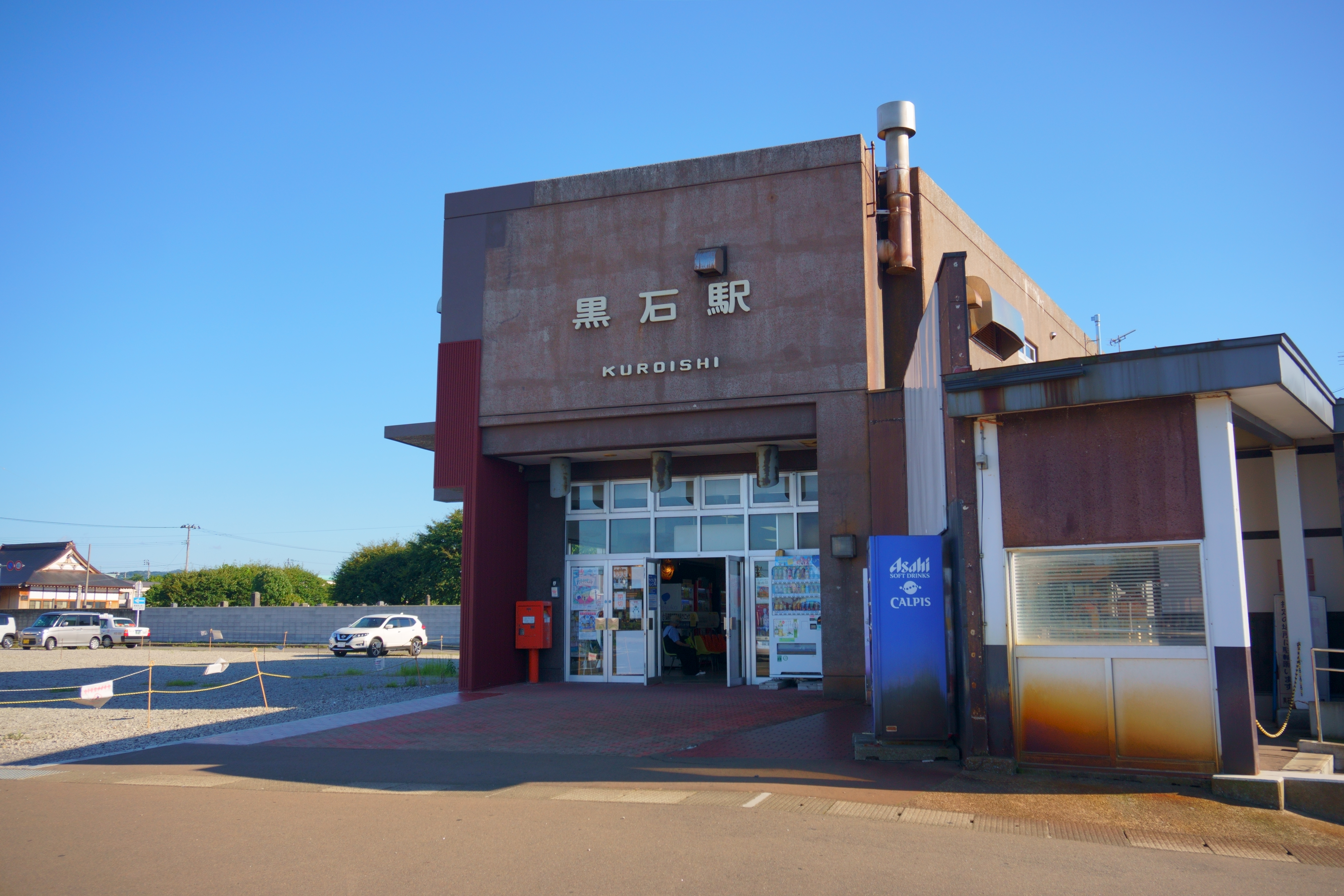
- Kuroishi Station in August 2022

General information
- Location: 1-115 Midori-chō, Kuroishi-shi, Aomori-ken 036-0383; Japan
- Coordinates: 40°38′53.62″N 140°35′30.84″E
- Operator: Kōnan Railway
- Line: ■ Kōnan Line
- Distance: 16.8 km from Hirosaki
- Platforms: 1 bay platform
- Tracks: 2

Other information
- Status: Staffed
- Website: Official website

History
- Opened: August 15, 1912
- Rebuilt: 1986
- Former names: Kōnan Kuroishi (until 1986)
Location
- Location within Aomori Prefecture Location within Japan

Kuroishi Station (黒石駅, Kuroishi-eki) is a railway station on the Kōnan Railway Kōnan Line in the city of Kuroishi, Aomori, Japan, operated by the private railway operator Konan Railway.

== Lines ==
Kuroishi Station is a terminal station on Kōnan Railway Kōnan Line, and is located 16.8 km from the starting point of the line at Hirosaki. Previously, it was a terminal on the now-defunct Kōnan Railway Kuroishi Line.

== Station layout ==
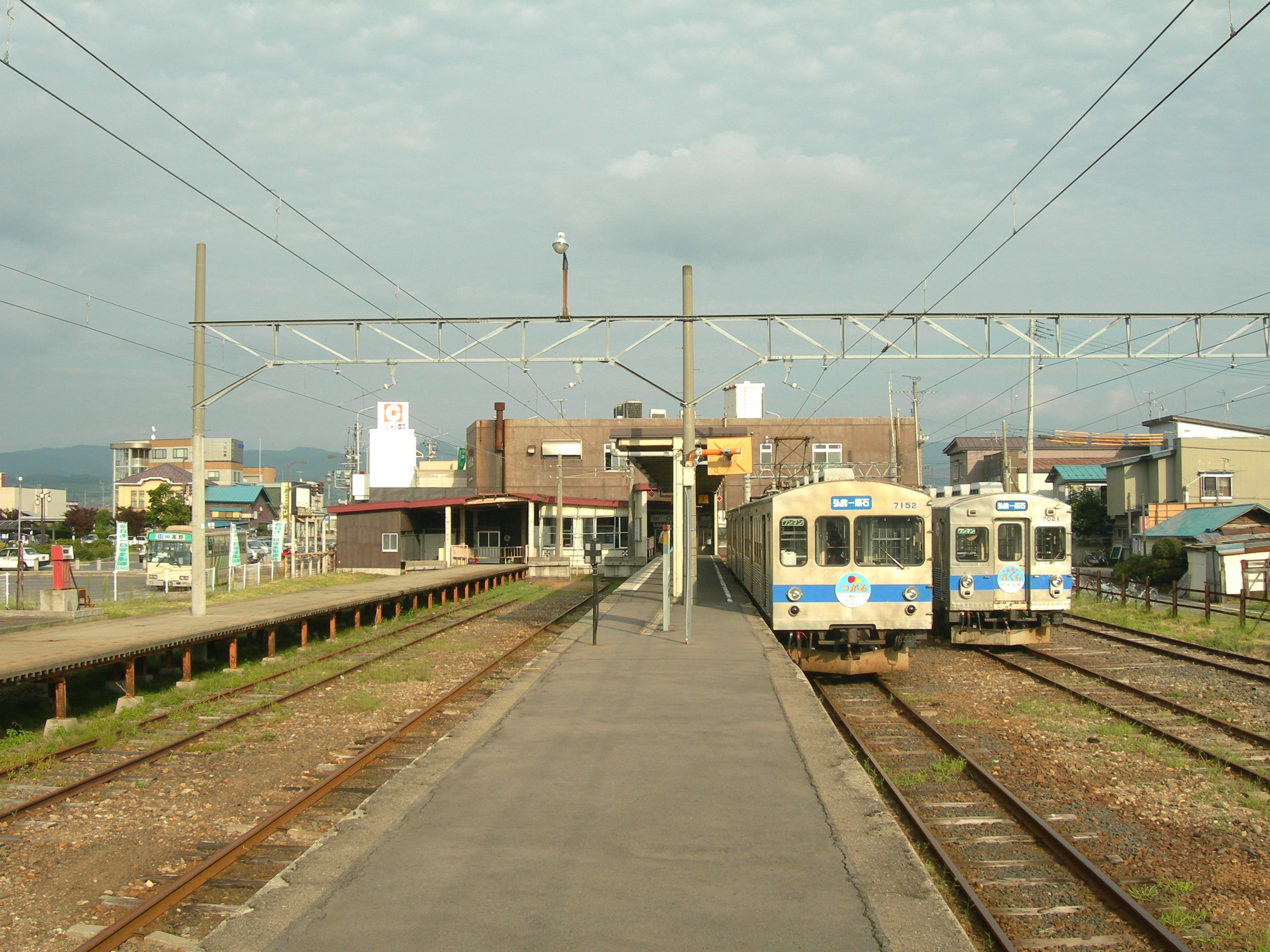
Kuroishi Station platform

The station has a single bay platform serving two tracks, although Track 2 is seldom used. The station is fully attended.

=== Platforms ===
1	■ Kōnan Railway Kōnan Line	for Hiraka and Hirosaki
2	■ Kōnan Railway Kōnan Line	(unused)

== Adjacent stations ==
«	Service	»
Kōnan Railway Kōnan Line
Sakaimatsu	Local	Terminus

== History ==
Kuroishi Station was opened on August 15, 1912 on the Japanese Government Railways Kuroishi Light Railway Line (黒石軽便線, Kuroishi-keiben-sen). An adjacent Kōnan Kuroishi Station was built in 1950 for use by the Kōnan Line. On November 1, 1984, the Kuroishi Light Railway was sold to the Kōnan Railway Company, and the original Kuroishi Station was demolished. The station has been operated as a (kan'i itaku station) since November 1984. On April 1, 1986 a new station building was completed, and the station reverted to its original name. The Kuroishi Line ceased operations on April 1, 1998.

== Surrounding area ==
- Kuroishi City Hall
- Kuroishi Post Office

== Bus services ==
- Kōnan Bus Company
  - For Aomori-Yadamae via Tobinai, Namioka, Shinjō and Aomori
  - For Kōya via Mayajiri, Tobinai, Namioka and Tarusawa
  - For Namioka Station via Hongō
  - For Hirosaki Bus terminal
    - via Tujinoki, Inakadate and Sakaizeki
    - via Guminoki, Takada, Hatakenaka, Toyomaki, and Wattoku-Kitaguchi
  - For Kawabe via Maeda-Yasiki
  - For Nijinoko-kōen via Yamagatachō and Itadome
  - For Nurukawa via Yamagatachō, Itadome and Nijinoko-kōen
  - For Ōwani Bus office via Tujinoki, Onoe, and Hiraka

== See also ==
- List of railway stations in Japan
