= Kan'i itaku station =

Type of railway station in Japan

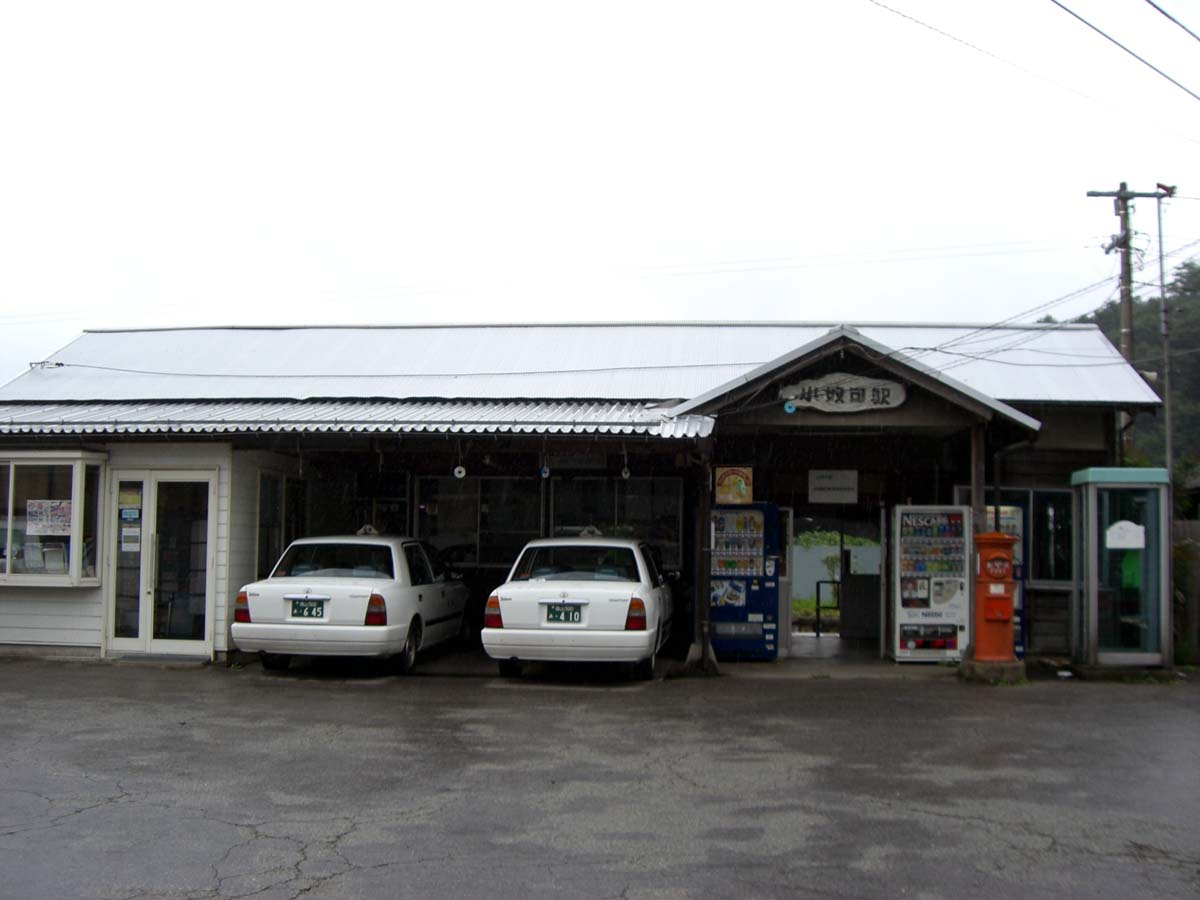
Onuka Station, a kantaku station on the JR West Geibi Line (2006-09-17).

A kan'i itaku station (簡易委託駅, kan'i itaku eki), sometimes abbreviated as kantaku station (簡託駅, kantaku eki), is a form of railway station in Japan which is operated by an entity other than the railway company using the station. These stations are commonly operated by the local municipality, an agricultural cooperative, a store in front of the station, or a private individual. Other than the entity operating the station, there is no difference to the passenger using the station.

The station attendant generally sells passenger tickets through a ticket window and posts the train schedules, while the train conductor or driver handles collection and validation of tickets in most cases. Because the station attendant does not directly deal with the passengers outside of ticket sales, the types of tickets they can sell is generally limited to fare tickets and books of tickets. Because of this, kantaku stations are considered only one step above an unstaffed station. There are a few places within the JR East and JR Kyushu, however, where the station attendant at a kantaku station handles the collection of the tickets as well as selling the tickets.

An exception to this are many of the kantaku stations operating within the area serviced by JR Central which have the MARS logo above the ticket window. These stations can sell tickets for any train within the JR Group, though most cannot be exchanged at a regular railway company operated station.
