= Hirosaki Station =

Railway station in Hirosaki, Aomori Prefecture, Japan

Hirosaki Station 弘前駅
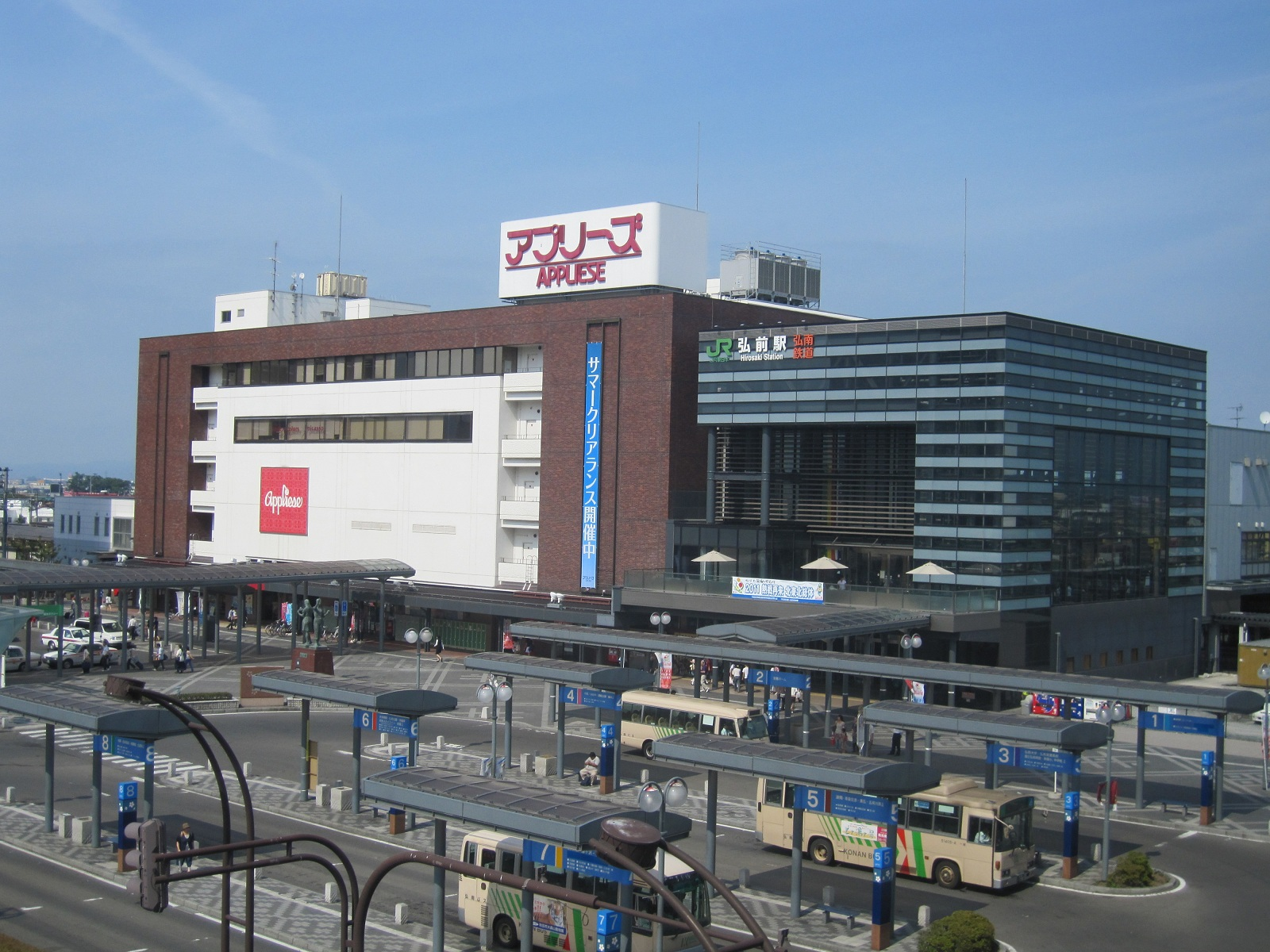
- Hirosaki Station in August 2011

General information
- Location: 1-1 Omotemachi, Hirosaki-shi, Aomori-ken 036-8096; Japan
- Coordinates: 40°35′56.22″N 140°29′6.12″E
- Operator: JR East; Kōnan Railway; JR Freight
- Lines: ■ Ōu Main Line; ■ Kōnan Line
- Distance: 447.1 km from Fukushima
- Platforms: 1 side + 1 island + 1 bay platform
- Connections: Bus stop

Other information
- Status: Staffed (Midori no Madoguchi )
- Website: Official website

History
- Opened: December 1, 1894

Passengers
- FY 2018: 4497 daily (JR East)

Services
Preceding station	JR East	Following station
Ōwani-Onsen towards Akita	Tsugaru	Namioka towards Aomori
Ōwani-Onsen towards Akita	Ōu Main Line Rapid	Kawabe towards Aomori
Ishikawa towards Shinjō	Ōu Main Line Local	Naijōshi towards Aomori
Terminus	Gonō Line Rapid; Local	Naijōshi towards Higashi-Noshiro
Preceding station	Kōnan Railway	Following station
Terminus	Kōnan Line	Hirosaki-Higashikōmae towards Kuroishi
Location
- Location within Aomori Prefecture Location within Japan

Hirosaki Station (弘前駅, Hirosaki-eki) is a railway station in the city of Hirosaki, Aomori Prefecture, Japan, jointly operated by East Japan Railway Company (JR East) and the private railway operator Kōnan Railway. It is also a freight terminal for the Japan Freight Railway Company.

== Lines ==
Hirosaki Station is served by the Ōu Main Line, and is located 447.1 km from the southern starting point of the Ōu Main Line at Fukushima. Although the terminus of the Gonō Line is at Kawabe, most trains continue on to terminate at Hirosaki for ease of connections. It also forms the terminus of the 16.8 km private Kōnan Railway Kōnan Line to Kuroishi.

== Limited express trains ==
Hirosaki Station is served by the following limited express train services.

- Tsugaru (Aomori - Akita)
- Akebono overnight sleeper service (Ueno - Aomori)
- Nihonkai overnight sleeper service (Osaka - Aomori)

== Station layout ==
Hirosaki Station is an elevated station. The JR portion has a single side platform and an island platform, serving three tracks, and the Kōnan Railway has a bay platform serving another two tracks. The station has a JR East Midori no Madoguchi staffed ticket office and View Plaza travel agency.

=== JR East platforms ===
1-3	■ Ou Main Line	for Ōdate and Akita
1-3	■ Ou Main Line	for Namioka and Aomori
1-3	■ Gono Line	for Goshogawara and Fukaura

=== Konan Railway platforms ===
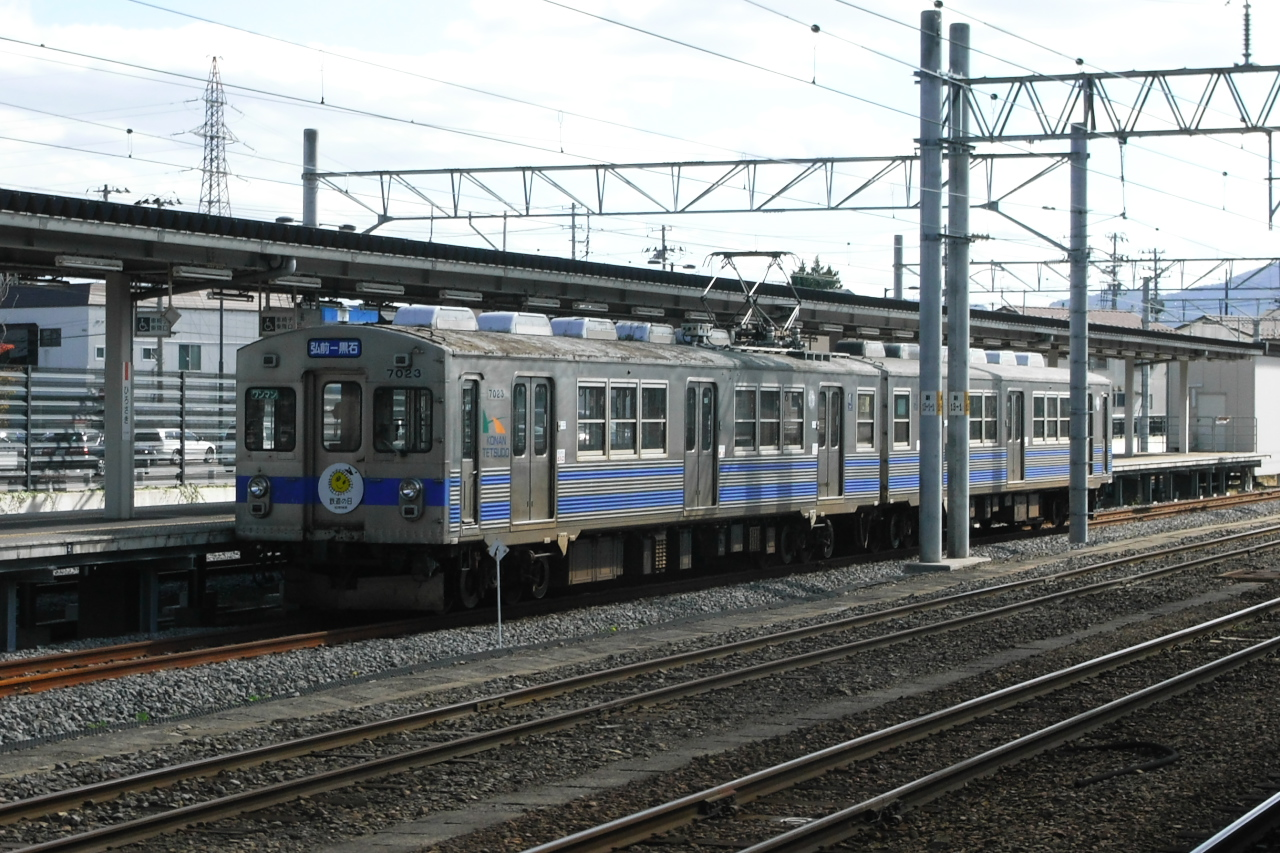
The Konan Railway platforms, October 2008

1-2	■ Kōnan Line	Hiraka and Kuroishi

== History ==
Hirosaki Station opened on December 1, 1894. On September 7, 1927, the Konan Railway also began operations at Hirosaki Station. The station building was again reconstructed in 1981 to incorporate a shopping center. With the privatization of JNR on April 1, 1987, the station came under the operational control of JR East. A new station building was completed in December 2004.

== Passenger statistics ==
In fiscal 2018, the JR East station was used by an average of 4,497 passengers daily (boarding passengers only). The Konan Railway station was used by an average of 2,851 passengers daily in fiscal 2011. The JR East passenger figures for previous years are as shown below.

Fiscal year	Daily average
2000	4,578
2005	4,424
2010	4,348
2015	4,625

== Surrounding area ==
- Hirosaki Post office
- Hirosakiekimae Post Office
- Hirosaki Bus terminal

== Bus services ==
=== Local services ===
- Kōnan Bus
  - For Karekitaira via Dake hot spring
  - For Fujishiro via Hamanomashi or Komagoshi
  - For Goshogawara Station via Fujisaki, Itayanagi and Tsuruta
  - For Namioka via Fujisaki
  - For Kuroishi Station via Inakadate
  - For Koguriyama via Hirosaki University
  - For Sōma via Akudo
  - For Tashiro via Kuniyoshi
  - For Aomori Airport (Express bus)

=== Long-distance bus services ===
- Jodel (ヨーデル, Yōderu) (operated by Kōnan Bus, JR Bus Tohoku, Iwate-Kenpoku Bus, and Iwate-Kenkōtsu)
  - For Morioka Station

== See also ==
- List of railway stations in Japan
