= Kōnan Railway Company =

Railway company in Japan

Konan Tetsudo Co., Ltd. 弘南鉄道株式会社
- Type: Unlisted stock company
- Industry: Transportation
- Founded: March 27, 1926
- Headquarters: Hirakawa, Aomori, Japan
- Area served: Aomori Prefecture, Japan
- Website: konantetsudo.jp

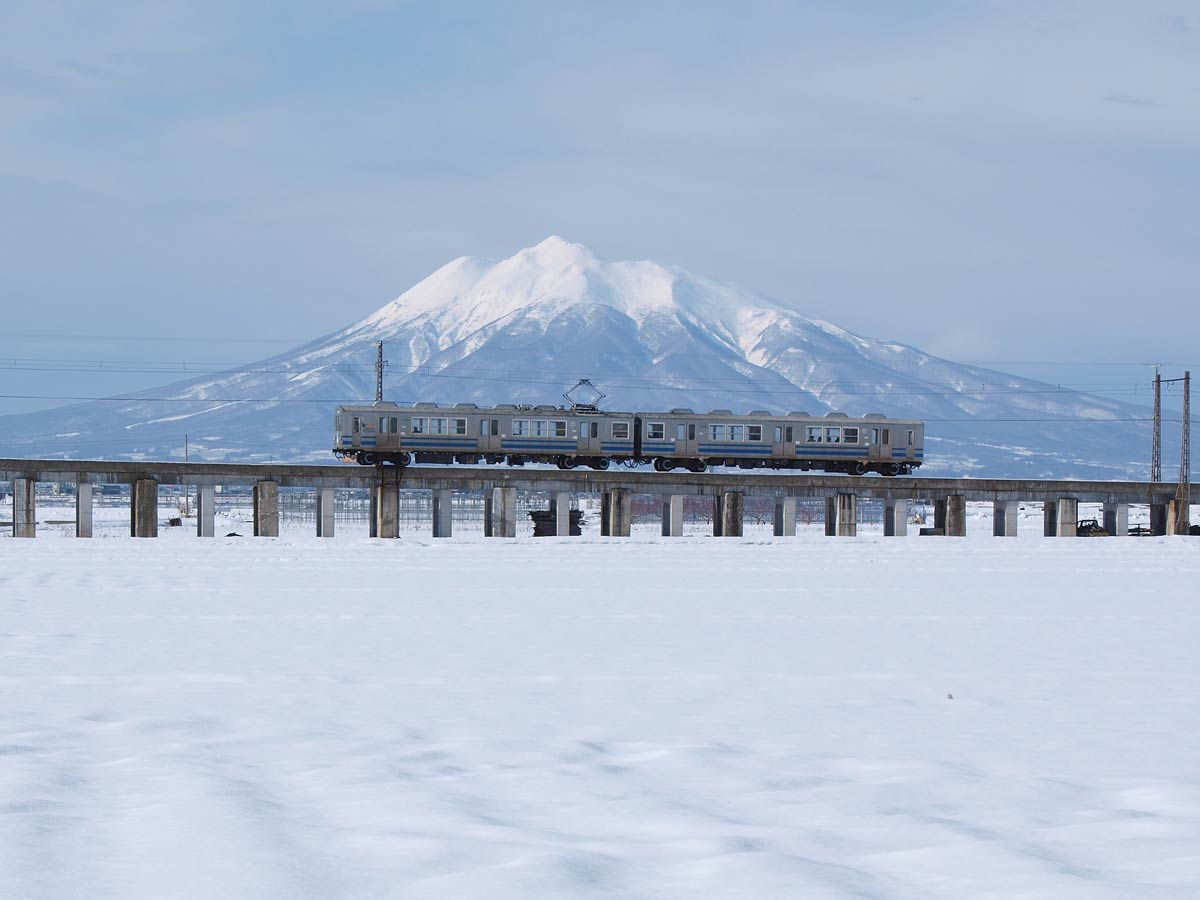
Kōnan Railway 7000 Series EMU and Mount Iwaki

The Kōnan Railway Company (弘南鉄道株式会社, Kōnan Tetsudō Kabushiki-gaisha), also known as Konan Tetsudo, is a railway company that provides transportation services in western Aomori Prefecture, Japan. The company operates two regional railway lines: the Kōnan Line, which connects Hirosaki Station in the city of Hirosaki and Kuroishi Station in the city of Kuroishi, and the Ōwani Line, which connects Hirosaki with Ōwani Station on the JR Ōu Main Line. The company also operates an extensive bus network. It is headquartered in the city of Hirakawa.

Between November 1, 1984, and April 1, 1998, the company also operated the Kuroishi Line, a former line of Japanese National Railways.

== Lines ==
Lines map

- Kōnan Line
- Ōwani Line

== History ==
The company was founded on March 27, 1926, and began operations between Hirosaki and Tsugaru-Onoe Station on September 7, 1927. Bus operations began on June 24, 1931, and were divested to a subsidiary company (the forerunner of the Kōnan Bus Company) on April 17, 1940.

On July 1, 1948, the Konan line was electrified at 600 VDC. The line was extended to Kuroishi Station by July 1, 1950.

On July 25, 1949, the Hirosaki Electric Railway (弘前電気鉄道株式会社, Hirosaki Denki-Tetsudō Kabushika-kaisha) was established, and connected Ōwani Station with Chuo-Hirosaki Station by January 26, 1952.

Voltage on the line was raised from 600 VDC to 750 VDC on April 1, 1954, and to 1500 VDC on September 1, 1961.

On October 1, 1970, the Hirosaki Electric Railway was acquired by the Kōnan Railway Company, and its line became the Kōnan Railway Ōwani Line.

On November 1, 1984, the former Japan National Railway Kuroshi Line was privatized by the government and acquired by the Kōnan Railway Company, becoming the Kōnan Railway Kuroishi Line, but was subsequently closed in 1998.

== See also ==
- List of railway companies in Japan
