= List of dams in Aomori Prefecture =

The following is a list of dams in Aomori Prefecture, Japan.

== List ==
Name	Location	Started	Opened	Height	Length	Image	DiJ number
Akaishi Dam		1953	1955	23.1 m (76 ft)	50.5 m (166 ft)		0190
Asamushi Dam		1981	2002	9 m (30 ft)	215 m (705 ft)		0222
Aseishigawa Dam		1971	1988	91 m (299 ft)			0207
Hanaki Dam		1966	1972	27 m (89 ft)	125.8 m (413 ft)		0200
Hayaseno Dam		1968	1985	56 m (184 ft)	285.9 m (938 ft)		0206
Hisayoshi Dam		1980	1995	57 m (187 ft)			0212
Hongō Dam		1950	1956	21.8 m (72 ft)	84.5 m (277 ft)		3005
Ichinowatari Dam		1930	1931	15.6 m (51 ft)	65.5 m (215 ft)		0183
Iizume Dam		1967	1973	38 m (125 ft)	234 m (768 ft)		0201
Kawauchi Dam		1973	1994	55 m (180 ft)	137 m (449 ft)		0210
Kodomari Dam		1988	1996	33.5 m (110 ft)			3004
Komagome Dam		1982		84.5 m (277 ft)	290.1 m (952 ft)		0224
Matakido Dam		1968	1988	34.6 m (114 ft)	179.6 m (589 ft)		0204
Meya Dam							
Namioka Dam		1973	1982	52.4 m (172 ft)	304.5 m (999 ft)		0209
Natsusaka Dam		1960	1966	27.5 m (90 ft)	141 m (463 ft)		0196
Ninokura Dam		1967	1970	37 m (121 ft)	106 m (348 ft)		0199
Nishonai Dam		1973	1995	86 m (282 ft)	430.8 m (1,413 ft)		0219
Odagawa Dam		1971	1975	31 m (102 ft)	203 m (666 ft)		0203
Okiura Dam		1933 (Note: Submerged in 1988 when Aseishigawa Dam was completed.)	1944				
Ominato Dam							
Sakuda Dam		1969	1979	31.5 m (103 ft)	257 m (843 ft)		0205
Sashikubo Dam		1985	2011	37.8 m (124 ft)	200 m (660 ft)		0215
Shimizume Dam		1976	2000	33.5 m (110 ft)	195 m (640 ft)		0208
Shimoyu Dam		1971	1988	70 m (230 ft)	783.5 m (2,571 ft)		0213
Shinkodoroku Dam			1967	23.8 m (78 ft)	294 m (965 ft)		0197
Shiwa Bosai Dam		1950	1961	22.8 m (75 ft)	121.2 m (398 ft)		0193
Soma Dam		1974	2003	52.4 m (172 ft)	222 m (728 ft)		0214
Tanosawa Tameike Dam		1932	1945	21 m (69 ft)	205 m (673 ft)		0187
Tenma Dam		1960	1970	50.5 m (166 ft)	202.8 m (665 ft)		0198
Tobe Dam		1968	1974	43 m (141 ft)	158 m (518 ft)		0202
Tsugaru Dam		29 Apr 2017	29 Apr 2017	97.2 m (319 ft)			2996
Tsukari Dam		1951	1962	30.2 m (99 ft)	268 m (879 ft)		0195
Wada Dam		1971	1996	44 m (144 ft)	303 m (994 ft)		0211
Yomasari Dam		1976	2003	52 m (171 ft)			0218

== See also ==
- Media related to Dams in Aomori prefecture at Wikimedia Commons
