= List of mergers in Aomori Prefecture =

Here is a list of mergers in Aomori Prefecture, Japan since the Heisei era.

== Mergers from April 1, 1999 to Present ==
- On July 1, 2004 - the village of Kuraishi (from Sannohe District) was merged into the expanded town of Gonohe.
- On January 1, 2005 - the old city of Towada absorbed the town of Towadako (from Kamikita District) to create the new and expanded city of Towada.
- On February 11, 2005 - the town of Kizukuri, and the villages of Inagaki, Kashiwa, Morita and Shariki (all from Nishitsugaru District), were merged to create the city of Tsugaru.
- On March 14, 2005 - the towns of Kawauchi and Ōhata, and the village of Wakinosawa (all from Shimokita District), were merged into the expanded city of Mutsu.
- On March 28, 2005 - the old city of Goshogawara (1st generation) absorbed the town of Kanagi, and the village of Shiura (both from Kitatsugaru District) to create the new and expanded city of Goshogawara (2nd generation).
- On March 28, 2005 - the town of Kanita, and the villages of Tairadate and Minmaya (all from Higashitsugaru District), were merged to create the town of Sotogahama.
- On March 28, 2005 - the village of Tokiwa (from Minamitsugaru District) was merged into the expanded town of Fujisaki.
- On March 28, 2005 - the town of Nakasato, and the village of Kodomari (both from Kitatsugaru District), were merged to create the town of Nakadomari.
- On March 31, 2005 - the village of Nangō (from Sannohe District) was merged into the expanded city of Hachinohe.
- On March 31, 2005 - the village of Iwasaki (from Nishitsugaru District) was merged into the expanded town of Fukaura.
- On March 31, 2005 - the village of Tenmabayashi (from Kamikita District) was merged into the expanded town of Shichinohe.
- On March 31, 2005 - the town of Kamikita (from Kamikita District) was merged into the expanded town of Tōhoku.
- On April 1, 2005 - the old city of Aomori absorbed the town of Namioka (from Minamitsugaru District) to create the new and expanded city of Aomori.
- On January 1, 2006 - the town of Nagawa, and the village of Fukuchi (both from Sannohe District) were merged into the expanded town of Nanbu.
- On January 1, 2006 - the towns of Hiraka and Onoe, and the village of Ikarigaseki (all from Minamitsugaru District) were merged to form the new city of Hirakawa.
- On February 27, 2006 - the old city of Hirosaki absorbed the town of Iwaki, and the village of Sōma (both from Nakatsugaru District) to create the new and expanded city of Hirosaki.
- On March 1, 2006 - the towns of Momoishi and Shimoda (from Kamikita District) were merged to create the town of Oirase.
- On September 1, 2007 - a portion of the Namioka part of the city of Aomori left Aomori and was merged into the town of Fujisaki.
