= Ikarigaseki, Aomori =

Ikarigaseki 碇ヶ関村
- Former municipality
- Flag Emblem

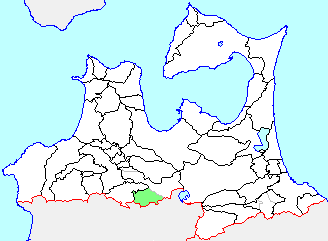
- Location of Ikarigaseki in Aomori Prefecture

- Location in Japan
- Coordinates: 40°28′30.8″N 140°37′46.6″E
- Country: Japan
- Region: Tōhoku
- Prefecture: Aomori Prefecture
- District: Minamitsugaru
- Merged: January 1, 2006 (now part of Hirakawa)

Area
  - Total: 105.33 km^{2} (40.67 sq mi)

Population (January 1, 2006)
  - Total: 3,140
  - Density: 29.8/km^{2} (77/sq mi)
- Time zone: UTC+09:00 (JST)
- Climate: Dfa
- Symbols
- Bird: Japanese bush warbler
- Flower: Rhododendron subg. Hymenanthes
- Tree: Cryptomeria

Ikarigaseki (碇ヶ関村, Ikarigaseki-mura) was a village located in Minamitsugaru District in central Aomori Prefecture, Japan.

Ikarigaseki was founded on April 1, 1889.

On January 1, 2006, Ikarigaseki, along with the towns of Hiraka and Onoe (all from Minamitsugaru District), was merged to create the new city of Hirakawa, and thus no longer exists as an independent municipality.

At the time of its merger, Ikarigaseki had an estimated population of 3,140 and a population density of 29.8 persons per km^{2}. The total area was 105.33 km^{2}.

Ikarigaseki was served by National Routes 7 and 282 as well as an interchange on the Tōhoku Expressway. Train service was provided by Tsugaru-Yunosawa Station and Ikarigaseki Station on the Ōu Main Line.

== Climate ==
Climate data for Ikarigaseki (1991−2020 normals, extremes 1976−present)
Month	Jan	Feb	Mar	Apr	May	Jun	Jul	Aug	Sep	Oct	Nov	Dec	Year
Record high °C (°F)	10.5 (50.9)	15.0 (59.0)	19.1 (66.4)	29.2 (84.6)	31.8 (89.2)	33.0 (91.4)	36.1 (97.0)	37.9 (100.2)	34.1 (93.4)	26.8 (80.2)	21.7 (71.1)	15.8 (60.4)	37.9 (100.2)
Mean daily maximum °C (°F)	0.4 (32.7)	1.5 (34.7)	5.6 (42.1)	13.3 (55.9)	19.6 (67.3)	23.4 (74.1)	26.6 (79.9)	28.0 (82.4)	24.0 (75.2)	17.4 (63.3)	10.0 (50.0)	3.0 (37.4)	14.4 (57.9)
Daily mean °C (°F)	−3.0 (26.6)	−2.4 (27.7)	1.0 (33.8)	7.3 (45.1)	13.5 (56.3)	17.7 (63.9)	21.6 (70.9)	22.6 (72.7)	18.3 (64.9)	11.6 (52.9)	5.1 (41.2)	−0.6 (30.9)	9.4 (48.9)
Mean daily minimum °C (°F)	−6.9 (19.6)	−6.8 (19.8)	−3.4 (25.9)	1.8 (35.2)	7.8 (46.0)	12.8 (55.0)	17.5 (63.5)	18.4 (65.1)	13.5 (56.3)	6.5 (43.7)	0.9 (33.6)	−4.1 (24.6)	4.8 (40.7)
Record low °C (°F)	−16.7 (1.9)	−17.2 (1.0)	−13.5 (7.7)	−8.4 (16.9)	−1.2 (29.8)	1.4 (34.5)	7.9 (46.2)	9.1 (48.4)	3.6 (38.5)	−1.9 (28.6)	−8.0 (17.6)	−15.6 (3.9)	−17.2 (1.0)
Average precipitation mm (inches)	112.0 (4.41)	101.1 (3.98)	110.8 (4.36)	111.0 (4.37)	106.0 (4.17)	97.3 (3.83)	164.0 (6.46)	209.4 (8.24)	163.1 (6.42)	137.4 (5.41)	157.6 (6.20)	141.7 (5.58)	1,620.8 (63.81)
Average snowfall cm (inches)	192 (76)	165 (65)	110 (43)	5 (2.0)	0 (0)	0 (0)	0 (0)	0 (0)	0 (0)	0 (0)	19 (7.5)	133 (52)	621 (244)
Average precipitation days (≥ 1.0 mm)	18.7	17.0	16.1	13.1	11.5	9.8	11.6	12.0	11.9	13.4	16.7	19.4	171.2
Average snowy days (≥ 3 cm)	19.4	17.1	12.9	0.6	0	0	0	0	0	0	2.4	13.5	65.9
Mean monthly sunshine hours	47.1	64.2	108.5	164.0	178.4	155.7	131.2	159.3	137.9	133.8	86.9	54.9	1,401.9
Source: Japan Meteorological Agency
