= Jimba Station =

Railway station in Ōdate, Akita Prefecture, Japan

Jimba Station 陣場駅
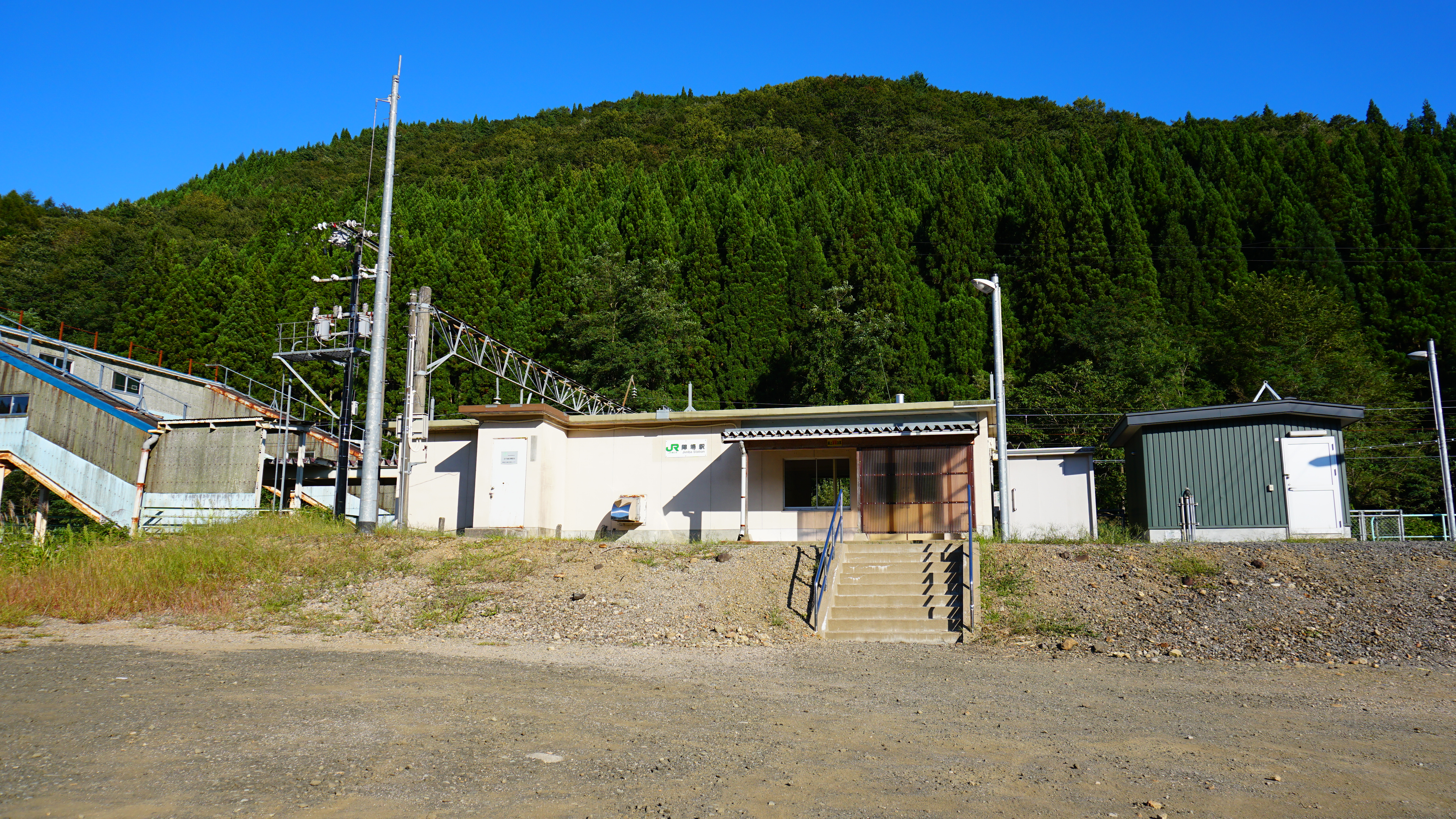
- Jimba Station (Sep 17, 2018)

General information
- Location: Sozendai Shakanai, Ōdate-shi, Akita-ken 017-0012; Japan
- Coordinates: 40°23′56.6″N 140°36′27.0″E
- Operator: JR East
- Line: ■ Ōu Main Line
- Distance: 416.5 kilometers from Fukushima
- Platforms: 1 side + 1 island platform

Other information
- Status: Unstaffed
- Website: Official website

History
- Opened: June 21, 1899

Services
Preceding station	JR East	Following station
Shirasawa towards Shinjō	Ōu Main Line Local	Tsugaru-Yunosawa towards Aomori
Location
- Location within Akita Prefecture Location within Japan

Jimba Station (陣場駅, Jinba-eki) is a railway station located in the city of Ōdate, Akita Prefecture, Japan, served by the East Japan Railway Company (JR East).

== Lines ==
Jimba Station is served by the Ōu Main Line, and is located 416.5 km from the terminus of the line at Fukushima.

== Station layout ==
The station consists of a single island platform and a single side platform serving three tracks, connected to the station building by a footbridge. However, Platform 2 is not in use. The station is unattended.

=== Platforms ===
1	■ Ōu Main Line	for Hirosaki and Aomori
2	■ Ōu Main Line	siding
3	■ Ōu Main Line	for Higashi-Noshiro and Akita

== History ==
Jimba Station was opened on June 21, 1899 a station on the Japanese Government Railways (JGR), serving village of Yatate, Akita. The JGR became the Japan National Railways (JNR) after World War II. The station was relocated to its present location in November 1970. The station has been unattended since October 1971. The station was absorbed into the JR East network upon the privatization of the JNR on April 1, 1987.

== Surrounding area ==
National Route 7

- Hikage Onsen
- Yatate Onsen

== See also ==
- List of railway stations in Japan
