= Nyango Star =

Mascot and drummer

Nyango Star にゃんごすたー
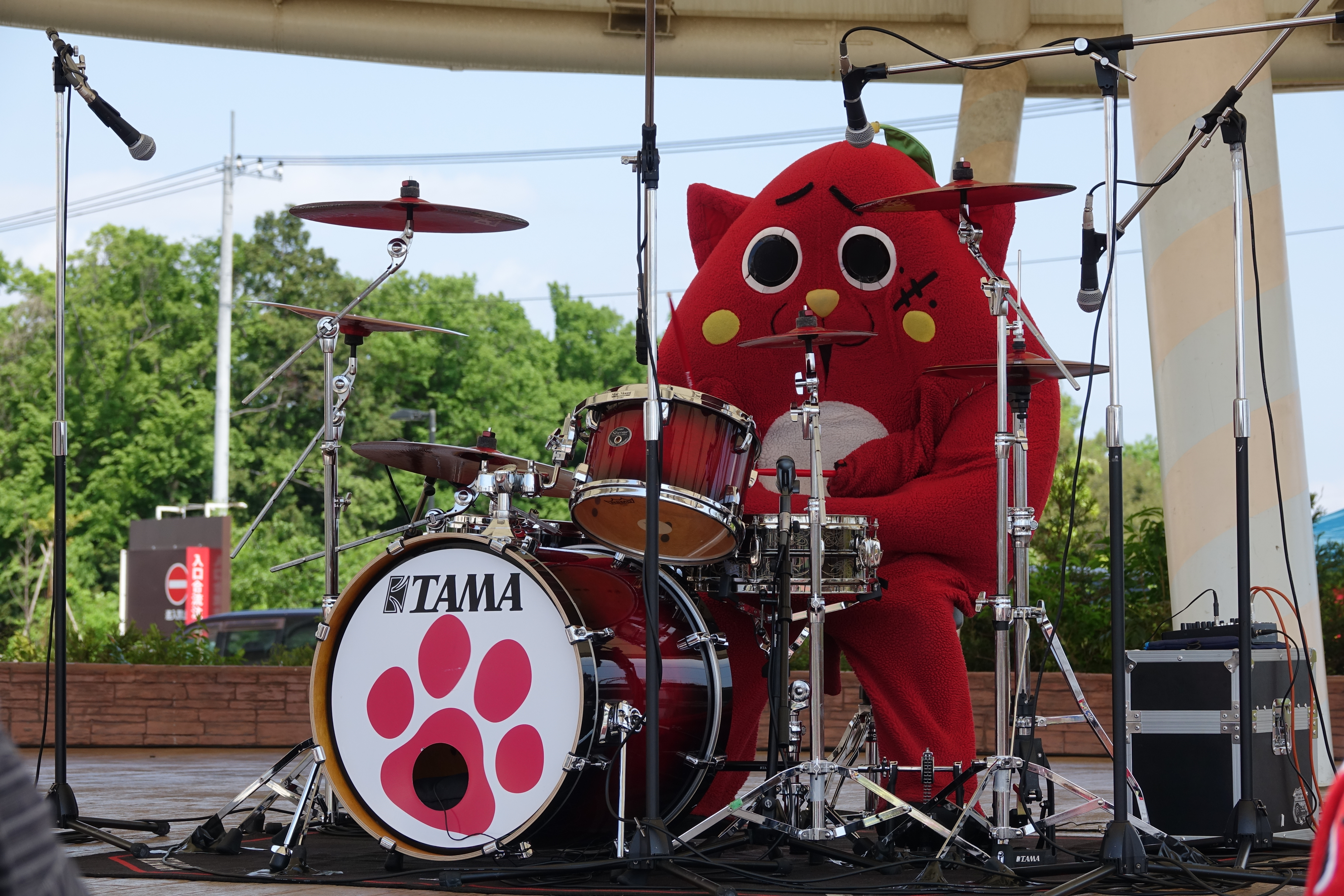
- Nyango Star in 2019

Background information
- Origin: Kuroishi, Aomori, Japan
- Genres: Heavy metal; death metal
- Instrument: Drum kit
- Years active: 2010s–present
- Website: https://nyangostar.jp/

Nyango Star (Japanese: にゃんごすたー) is a yuru-chara and drummer who is the mascot of Kuroishi, Aomori, Japan. The character is a hybrid of an apple and a cat. His name is inspired by drummer Ringo Starr. Played by an anonymous performer, Nyango Star plays heavy metal drums. The character's concerts and merchandise increases revenue and attention for Kuroishi, a farming community with a declining population. Videos of Nyango Star performing the theme song to Anpanman went viral in Japan in 2019 and became an international internet meme the following year. He is one of the most famous yuru-chara.

== Character ==
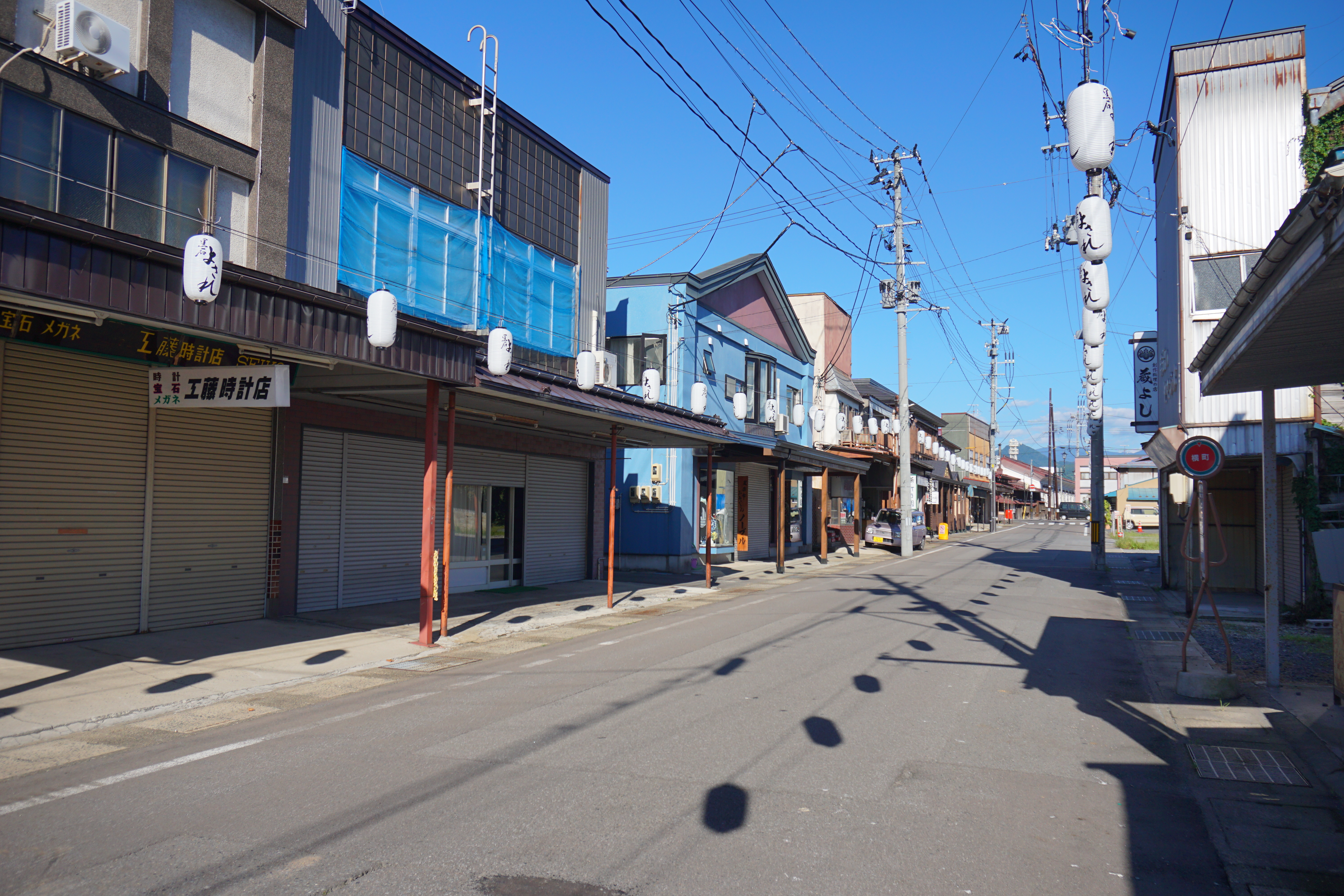
Kuroishi, Aomori, the home of Nyango Star

Nyango Star is a yuru-chara, a type of Japanese mascot that municipalities have used to increase tourism. He represents Kuroishi, a farming community in central Aomori Prefecture in northeastern Japan. Kuroishi has an aging population, like much of Japan, and its rate of population decline in 2019 was double the national average. The region recovered from a large earthquake in 2011. Nyango Star's performances and merchandise are a source of money for Kuroishi, and attention to the character increases awareness of the municipality.

The character is a monster hybrid of an apple and a cat. The apple design is inspired by the apple industry of Aomori. He is a plush mascot with a cute, child-oriented design. His name combines the Japanese words for meow (にゃん, nyan) and apple (林檎, ringo) with the name of drummer Ringo Starr. In his fictional backstory, Nyango Star was a cat who died in an apple orchard and reincarnated as an apple, and he must become a famous musician to restore his original form.

Nyango Star plays the drums in a fast heavy metal or death metal style. He performs concerts for children as well as larger concerts and music festivals. He has a YouTube channel on which he performs cover versions of songs, including songs from Slipknot, Babymetal, Linkin Park, and the soundtrack of Skyrim. He has performed with Japanese musicians such as Shō Kiryūin of the band Golden Bomber. In 2019, Nyango Star's YouTube channel posted a video of him performing with nu metal band Maximum the Hormone, playing its song “Shimi.”

The character's creator performs as Nyango Star and owns the rights to him. The performer is anonymous, as is the norm for yuru-chara. The character's merchandise is produced by Being Group and has included a collaboration with Hello Kitty. Nyango Star has appeared in advertisements for products such as Pepsi, the film Bohemian Rhapsody, and an apple-flavored yogurt.

== Popularity and reception ==
A video of Nyango Star drumming the theme song to Anpanman went viral on Twitter in March 2017, receiving over 90,000 retweets and 110,000 likes. This made him a celebrity in Japan, and fans asked him for autographs. Nyango Star's Anpanman performance went viral again after being posted on Twitter by music writer Eric Alper in October 2018, with the caption, "When you’re overqualified for the job." The video became an internet meme and he gained international fame. Nyango Star and Kuroishi were the subject of a 2019 documentary by Vice News.

Nyango Star is one of the most famous yuru-chara. In a reader survey by Ultimate Guitar of the top 15 new drummers of the 2010s, Nyango Star ranked number one, behind Will Ferrell at number zero.
