= Kuroishi Onsenkyō Prefectural Natural Park =

Japanese Natural Park

Coordinates: 40°34′5″N 140°43′56″E

- 黒石温泉郷県立自然公園
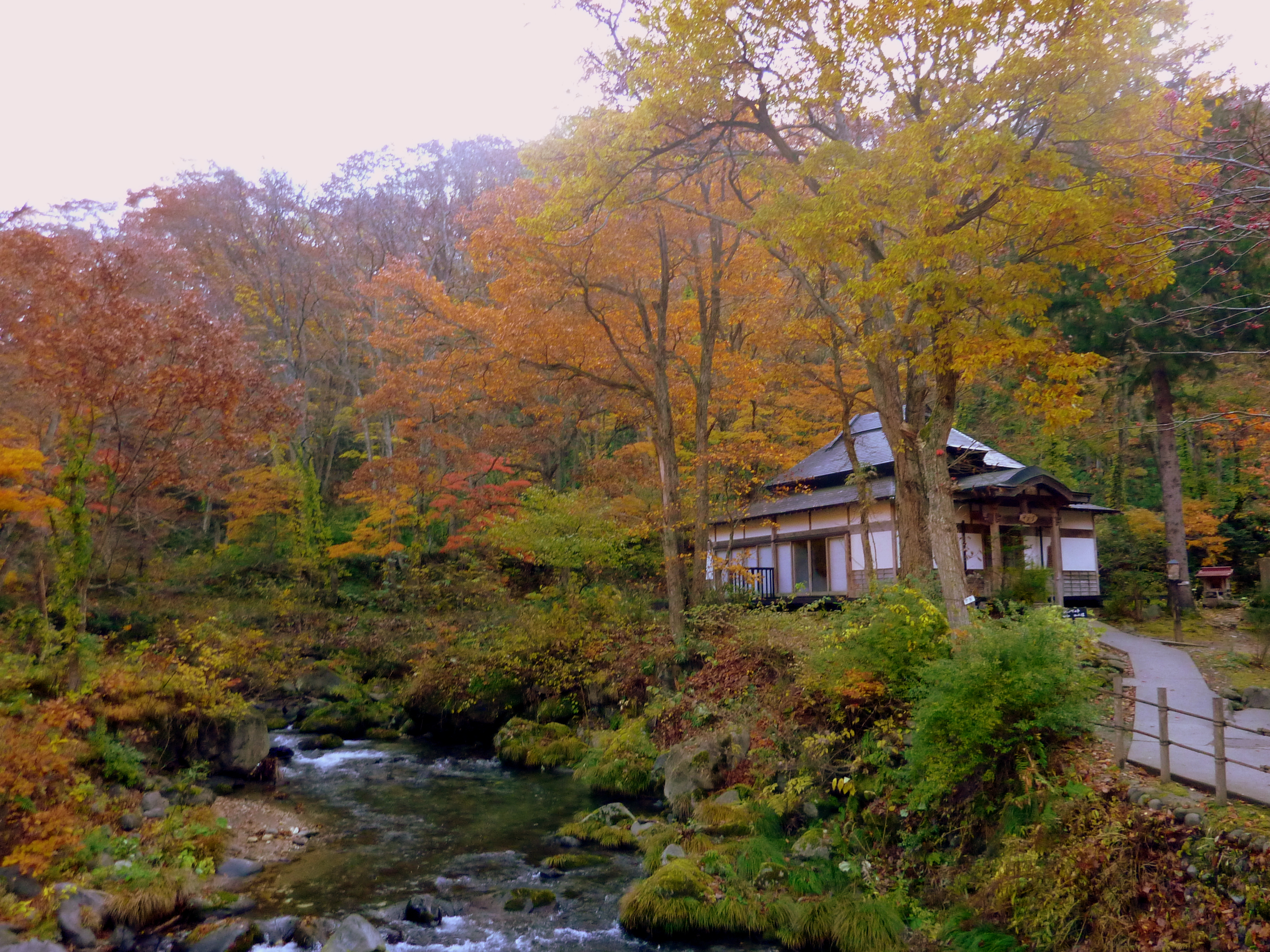
- Aoni Onsen
- Interactive map of Kuroishi Onsenkyō Prefectural Natural Park
- Location: Aomori Prefecture, Japan
- Nearest city: Kuroishi/Hirakawa
- Area: 51.00 km^{2} (19.69 sq mi)
- Established: 14 October 1958

Kuroishi Onsenkyō Prefectural Natural Park (黒石温泉郷県立自然公園, Kuroishi Onsenkyō kenritsu shizen-kōen) is a Prefectural Natural Park in central Aomori Prefecture, Japan. Established in 1958, the park spans the borders of the municipalities of Kuroishi and Hirakawa. It derives its name from the onsen of Kuroishi Onsenkyō (黒石温泉郷).

== See also ==
- National Parks of Japan
