= Ujaku Akita =

Japanese author (1883–1962)

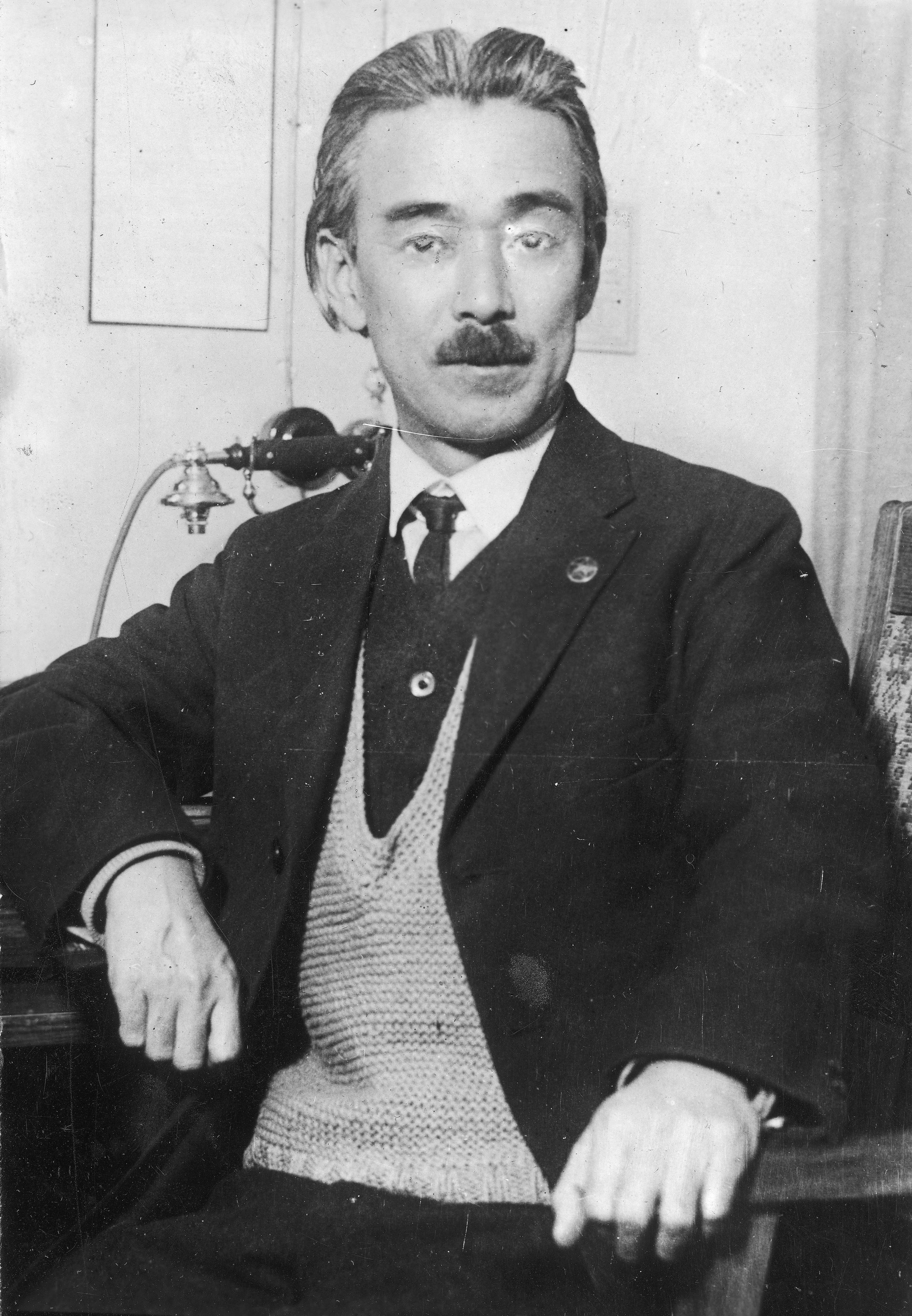
Akita in 1927

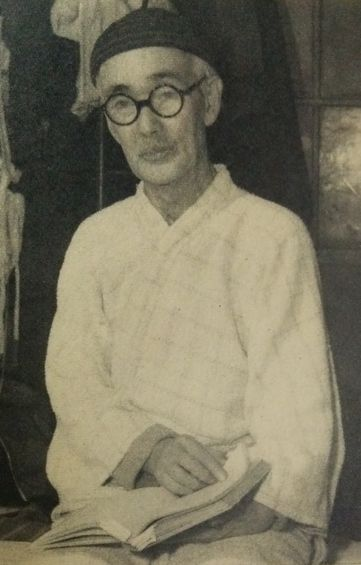
Akita in 1956

Ujaku Akita (秋田 雨雀, Akita Ujaku; 30 January 1883 – 12 May 1962) was the pseudonym of Tokuzō Akita (秋田 徳三, Akita Tokuzō), a Japanese author and Esperantist. He is best known for his plays, books, and short stories for children.

== Biography ==
Born in Kuroishi, Aomori Prefecture, he studied English literature at Waseda University and became interested in socialism. In 1913 he learnt Esperanto from Vasili Eroshenko, as a result of a chance meeting, and soon became a leader of the proletarian Esperanto movement, and a member of the "La Semanto" group in 1921. He visited the USSR in 1927 for the celebrations of the tenth anniversary of the revolution. In January 1931 he helped found the national organization, Japana Prolet-Esperantista Unio (JPEU), with about 150 members, and with Akita as president. He translated Eroshenko's writings into Japanese, and wrote a textbook on Esperanto.

The rise of militarism in Japan led to difficulties for Akita; in the autumn of 1933 he was detained for several weeks, and forced to write a long statement about his activities. Nevertheless, he continued to work, founding a magazine the next year, Teatoro (named after the Esperanto word for theatre), which still exists. He joined the New Cooperative Theatre (Shinkyō Gekidan) but its activities were limited because it was no longer safe to stage plays with political themes. The JPEU was shut down by the police.

After the war he established a performing arts school and was active in other organizations, such as the New Japan Literary Society (Shin Nihon Bungakukai) and established the Japan Militant Atheists' Alliance (Nihon Sentokteki Mushinronsha Domei). He died in 1962. A museum in his hometown was opened in 1979.

== Selected works ==
=== In Japanese ===
- Higashi no Kodomo ("Children in the East", anthology, 1921)
- Taiyô to Hanazono ("The Sun and the Flower Garden", anthology, 1921)
- Mohan Esuperanto-Dokusyu: Memlernanto de Esperanto ("Esperanto by Self-Study", with Osaka Kenji, textbook, 1927)
- Ujaku jiden ("Autobiography", 1953)

=== Translated into Esperanto ===
- Tri dramoj ("Three plays" translated in 1927 by Haĵime Ŝuzui, Kaname Susuki)
  - Fonto de sudroj ("Shudras' Fountain")
  - Danco de skeletoj ("Skeleton Dance")
  - Nokto ĉe landolimoj. ("Night at the Frontiers")
- Tiuj, kiuj ĉirkaŭas la ĉerkon ("Those who gather round the coffin" translated c. 1925 by Junko Sibata)
