= Aseishigawa Dam =

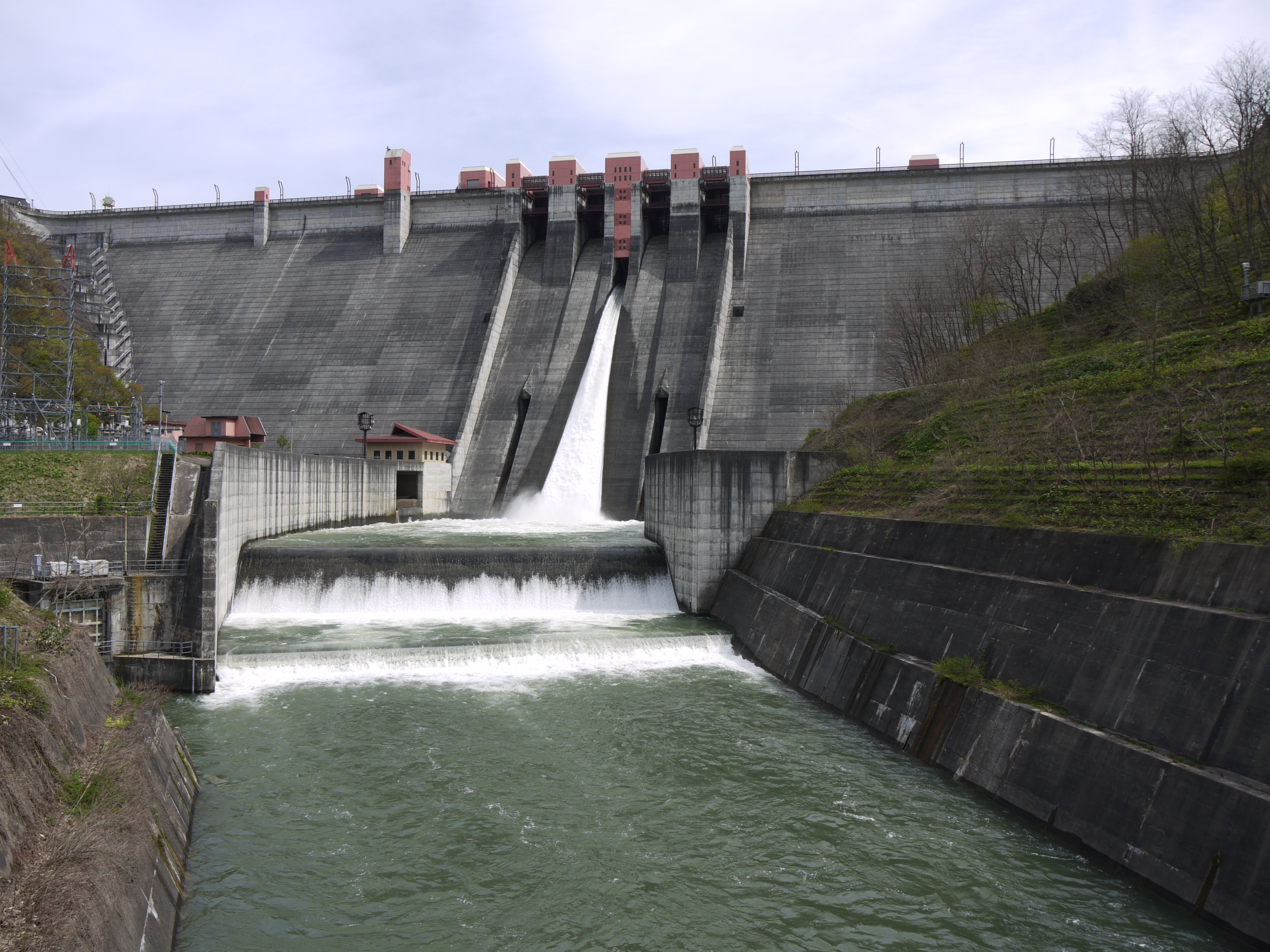
- Aseishigawa Dam

- Location within Aomori Prefecture Location within Japan
- Official name: 浅瀬石川ダム
- Location: Kuroishi, Aomori, Japan
- Coordinates: 40°35′49″N 140°41′23″E
- Construction began: 1971
- Opening date: 1988

Dam and spillways
- Type of dam: Gravity
- Impounds: Aseishi River
- Height: 91 m (299 ft)
- Length: 256 m (840 ft)
- Dam volume: 700,000 m^{3} (25,000,000 cu ft)

Reservoir
- Creates: Nijino Lake
- Total capacity: 53,100,000 m^{3} (1.88×10^{9} cu ft)
- Catchment area: 225.1 km^{2} (86.9 sq mi)
- Surface area: 220 ha (540 acres)

Aseishigawa Dam (浅瀬石川ダム, Aseishigawa damu) is a multi-purpose dam on the Aseishi River, a tributary of the Iwaki River in the city of Kuroishi in Aomori Prefecture, Japan. Construction began on the dam in 1971, and it was completed in 1988.
