= Kuroishi, Aomori =

Kuroishi 黒石市
- City
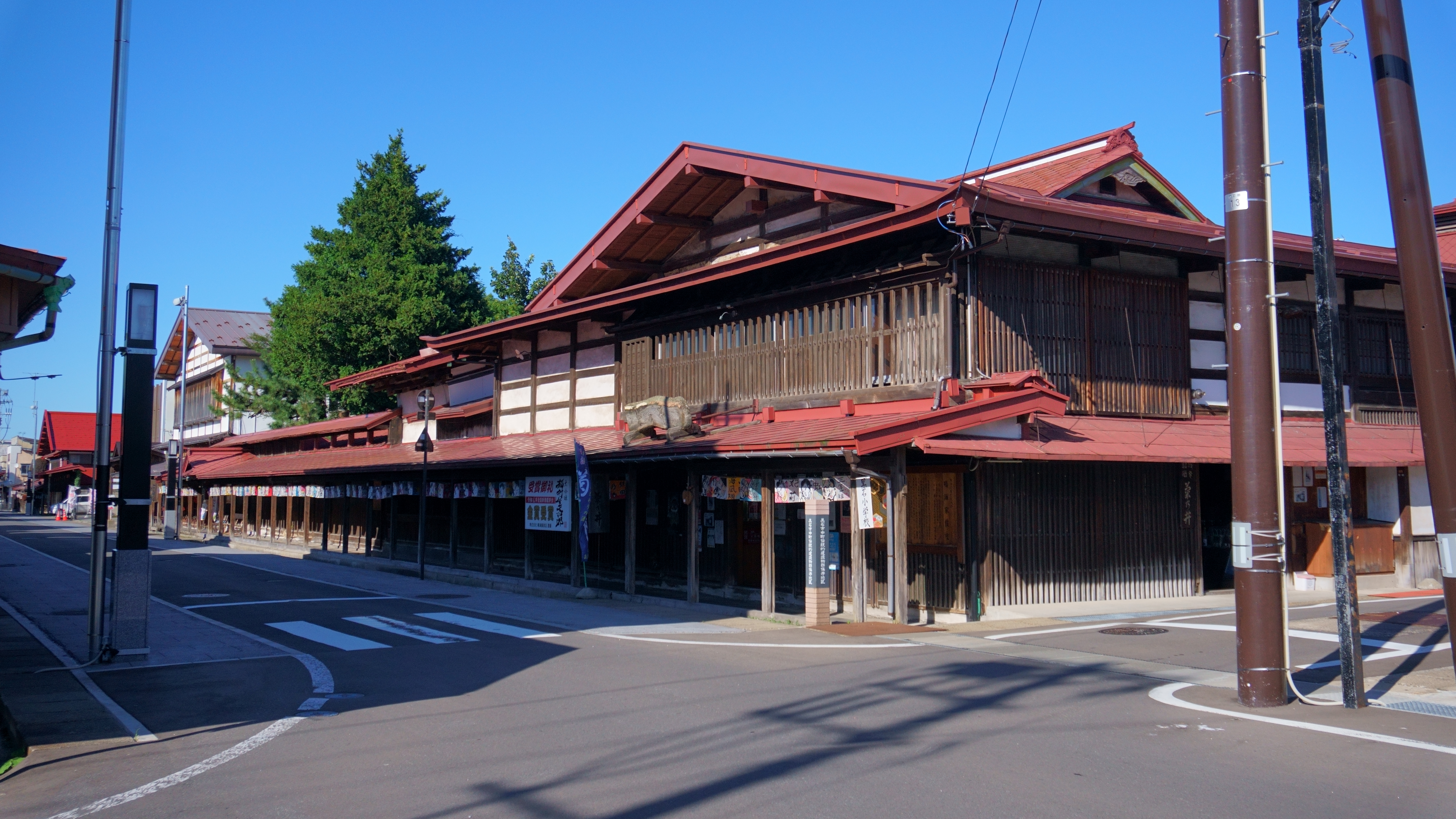
- Nakamachi district, Kuroishi City

- Flag Seal
- Interactive map of Kuroishi
- Coordinates: 40°38′33.4″N 140°36′40.7″E
- Country: Japan
- Region: Tōhoku
- Prefecture: Aomori

Area
  - Total: 217.05 km^{2} (83.80 sq mi)

Population (January 31, 2023)
  - Total: 31,540
  - Density: 145.3/km^{2} (376.4/sq mi)
- Time zone: UTC+9 (Japan Standard Time)
- Phone number: 0173-42-2111
- Address: 11-1 Ichinomachi, Kuroishi-shi, Aomori-ken 036-0396
- Climate: Cfa/Dfa
- Website: Official website
- Symbols
- Bird: Japanese wagtail (Motacilla grandis)
- Flower: Apple (Malus domestica)
- Tree: Painted maple (Acer mono)

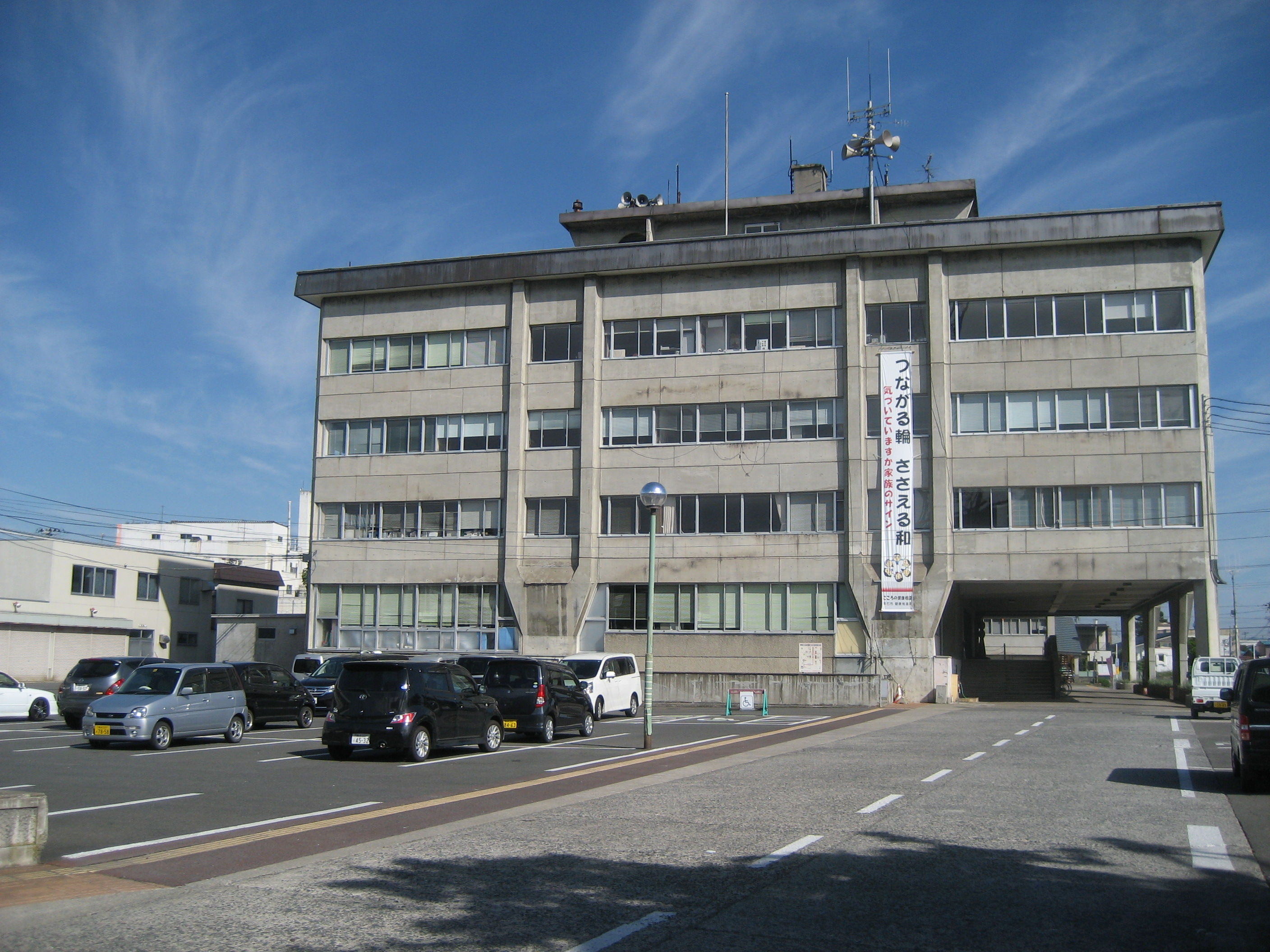
Kuroishi City Hall

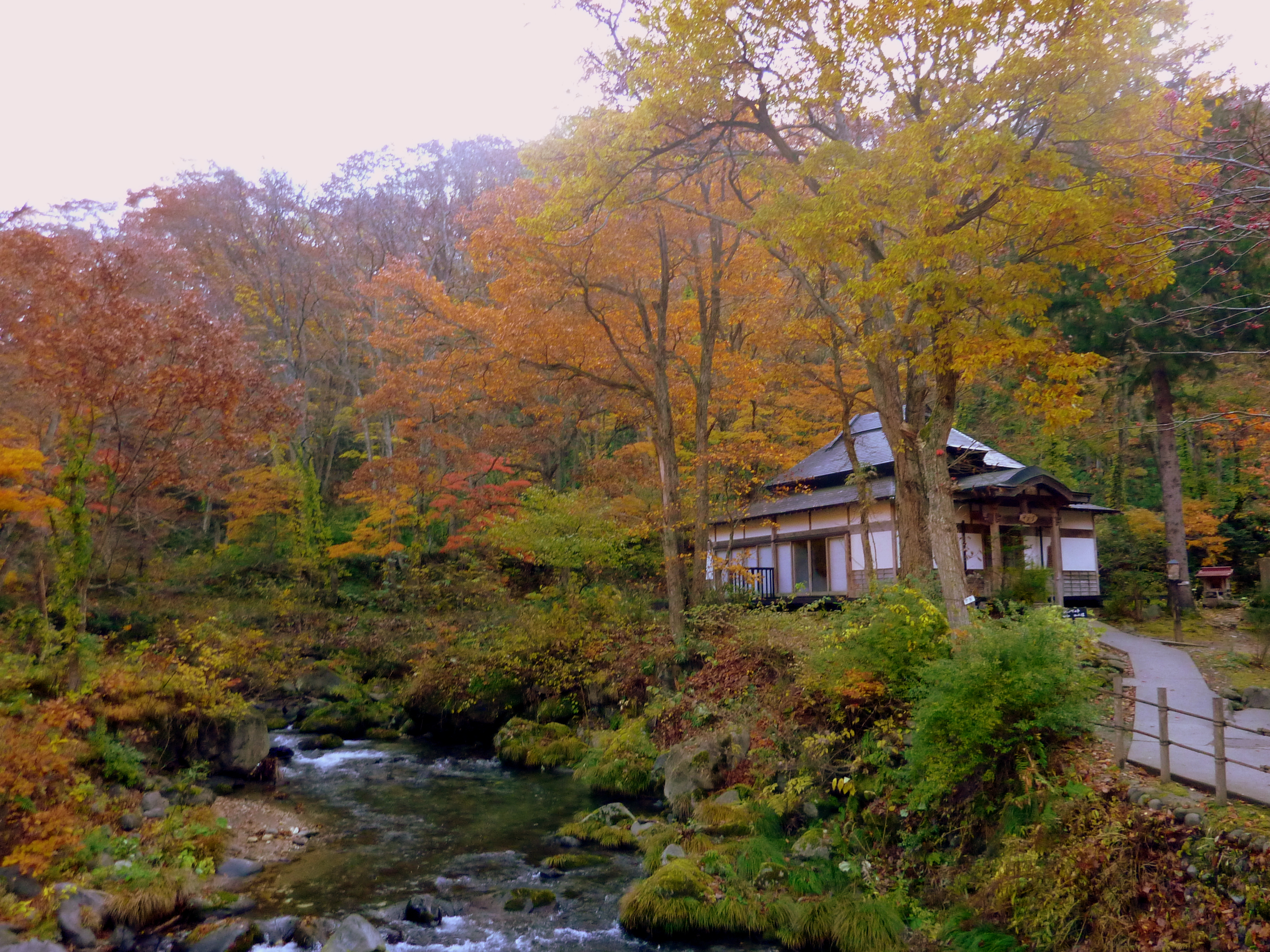
Aoni Onsen in the mountains of Kuroishi

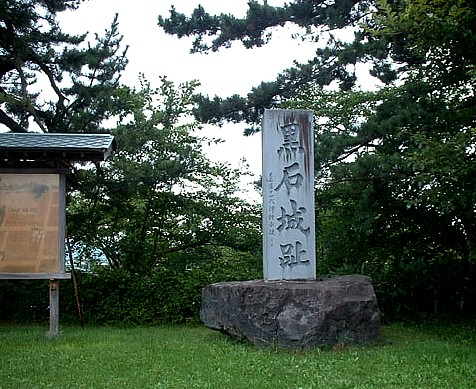
Site of Kuroishi Castle

Kuroishi (黒石市, Kuroishi-shi) is a city located in Aomori Prefecture, Japan. As of 31 January 2023, the city had an estimated population of 31,540 in 13,948 households and a population density of 150 people per km^{2}. The total area of the city is 217.05 square kilometers (83.80 sq mi).

== Geography ==
Kuroishi is located in west-central Aomori Prefecture, bordered by the Hakkōda Mountains to be east. The urban area is on the western edge of the city. Part of the city is within the borders of the Kuroishi Onsenkyō Prefectural Natural Park.

=== Neighboring municipalities ===
- Aomori Prefecture:
  - Aomori
  - Fujisaki
  - Hirakawa
  - Inakadate

== Climate ==
The city has a cold humid continental climate (Köppen Dfa) characterized by warm short summers and long cold winters with heavy snowfall. The average annual temperature in Kuroishi is 9.6 °C (49.3 °F). The average annual rainfall is 1,343 mm (52.9 in) with September as the wettest month. The temperatures are highest on average in August, at around 23.3 °C (73.9 °F), and lowest in January, at around −2.9 °C (26.8 °F).

Climate data for Kuroishi (elevation 30 m, 1991–2020 normals, extremes 1976–present)
| Month | Jan | Feb | Mar | Apr | May | Jun | Jul | Aug | Sep | Oct | Nov | Dec | Year |
|---|---|---|---|---|---|---|---|---|---|---|---|---|---|
| Record high °C (°F) | 11.3 (52.3) | 17.1 (62.8) | 19.9 (67.8) | 27.4 (81.3) | 31.8 (89.2) | 32.5 (90.5) | 35.9 (96.6) | 36.4 (97.5) | 35.0 (95.0) | 28.3 (82.9) | 23.2 (73.8) | 16.6 (61.9) | 36.4 (97.5) |
| Mean daily maximum °C (°F) | 1.1 (34.0) | 1.9 (35.4) | 5.8 (42.4) | 13.6 (56.5) | 19.3 (66.7) | 22.7 (72.9) | 26.2 (79.2) | 27.6 (81.7) | 24.2 (75.6) | 17.9 (64.2) | 10.8 (51.4) | 3.9 (39.0) | 14.6 (58.3) |
| Daily mean °C (°F) | −1.8 (28.8) | −1.4 (29.5) | 2.0 (35.6) | 8.3 (46.9) | 14.0 (57.2) | 17.9 (64.2) | 21.8 (71.2) | 23.0 (73.4) | 19.0 (66.2) | 12.7 (54.9) | 6.5 (43.7) | 0.7 (33.3) | 10.2 (50.4) |
| Mean daily minimum °C (°F) | −5.2 (22.6) | −5.2 (22.6) | −2.1 (28.2) | 3.3 (37.9) | 9.1 (48.4) | 13.9 (57.0) | 18.2 (64.8) | 19.2 (66.6) | 14.5 (58.1) | 7.8 (46.0) | 2.3 (36.1) | −2.6 (27.3) | 6.1 (43.0) |
| Record low °C (°F) | −18.3 (−0.9) | −16.5 (2.3) | −14.4 (6.1) | −6.4 (20.5) | 0.8 (33.4) | 4.7 (40.5) | 10.0 (50.0) | 9.1 (48.4) | 4.8 (40.6) | −1.9 (28.6) | −10.4 (13.3) | −13.3 (8.1) | −18.3 (−0.9) |
| Average precipitation mm (inches) | 82.1 (3.23) | 60.5 (2.38) | 49.1 (1.93) | 58.4 (2.30) | 63.4 (2.50) | 66.3 (2.61) | 117.5 (4.63) | 127.9 (5.04) | 125.9 (4.96) | 107.2 (4.22) | 108.7 (4.28) | 92.9 (3.66) | 1,060.1 (41.74) |
| Average precipitation days (≥ 1.0 mm) | 18.3 | 15.2 | 12.7 | 10.3 | 9.0 | 8.2 | 9.2 | 10.1 | 10.9 | 12.9 | 16.0 | 18.6 | 151.8 |
| Mean monthly sunshine hours | 37.6 | 58.1 | 119.1 | 177.3 | 199.1 | 179.5 | 158.4 | 182.8 | 159.1 | 138.0 | 87.6 | 48.1 | 1,544.8 |
Source: Japan Meteorological Agency (1991–2020 normals, extremes 1976–present)

== Demographics ==
Per Japanese census data, the population of Kuroishi has declined over the past 40 years.

Historical population
| Year | Pop. | ±% p.a. |
|---|---|---|
| 1960 | 41,033 | — |
| 1970 | 37,690 | −0.85% |
| 1980 | 40,755 | +0.78% |
| 1990 | 39,213 | −0.38% |
| 2000 | 39,059 | −0.04% |
| 2010 | 36,132 | −0.78% |
| 2020 | 31,946 | −1.22% |

== History ==
The area of Kuroishi was part of the holdings of the Tsugaru clan of Hirosaki Domain in the Edo period, and became the semi-independent Kuroishi Domain in 1809. The Nakamachi neighborhood has rows of shops connected by a covered arcade. This arcade dates from 1656 and is a Registered Tangible Cultural Property. After the Meiji Restoration, the town of Kuroishi was established in within Minamitsugaru District in Aomori Prefecture with the establishment of the modern municipalities system on April 1, 1889. The city was founded on 1 July 1954, from the merger of the town of Kuroishi absorbing the villages of Nakagō, Rokugō, Yamagata and Aseishi. On 1 October 1956, Kuroishi absorbed a portion of the neighboring town of Onoe.

== Government ==
Kuroishi has a mayor–council form of government with a directly elected mayor and a unicameral city legislature of 16 members. Kuroishi contributes one member to the Aomori Prefectural Assembly. In terms of national politics, the city is part of Aomori 3rd district of the lower house of the Diet of Japan.

== Economy ==
The economy of Kuroishi is heavily dependent on agriculture. The city serves as a minor regional commercial center. Agricultural produce includes rice and apples.

== Art and culture ==
Kuroishi has a yuru-chara known as Nyango Star.

== Education ==
Kuroishi has four public elementary schools and two public junior high schools operated by the city government and two public high schools operated by the Aomori Prefectural Board of Education. The prefecture also operates one special education school for the handicapped.

== Transportation ==
=== Railway ===
Kōnan Railway Company - Kōnan Line

- Kuroishi - Sakaimatsu

=== Highway ===
- Tōhoku Expressway
- National Route 102
- National Route 394

== Sister cities ==
- Miyako, Iwate Prefecture, Japan – since April 1, 1966
- Wenatchee, Washington, United States – since October 5, 1971
- Yeongcheon, Gyeongsangbuk-do, South Korea – since August 17, 1984

== Local attractions ==
- Apple Research Institute
- Kuroishi Neputa Festival
- Kuroishi Onsenkyō Prefectural Natural Park
- Kanehiranari-en, National Place of Scenic Beauty
- Nakamachi Komise Street, Registered Tangible Cultural Property
- Nakano Momiji Mountain
- Tsugaru Traditional Arts and Crafts Museum, Tsugaru Kokeshi Museum

== Noted people from Kuroishi ==
- Ujaku Akita, playwright, author of children's books
- Takahito Kudo, professional baseball player
