= Shirasawa Station (Akita) =

Railway station in Ōdate, Akita Prefecture, Japan

Shirasawa Station 白沢駅
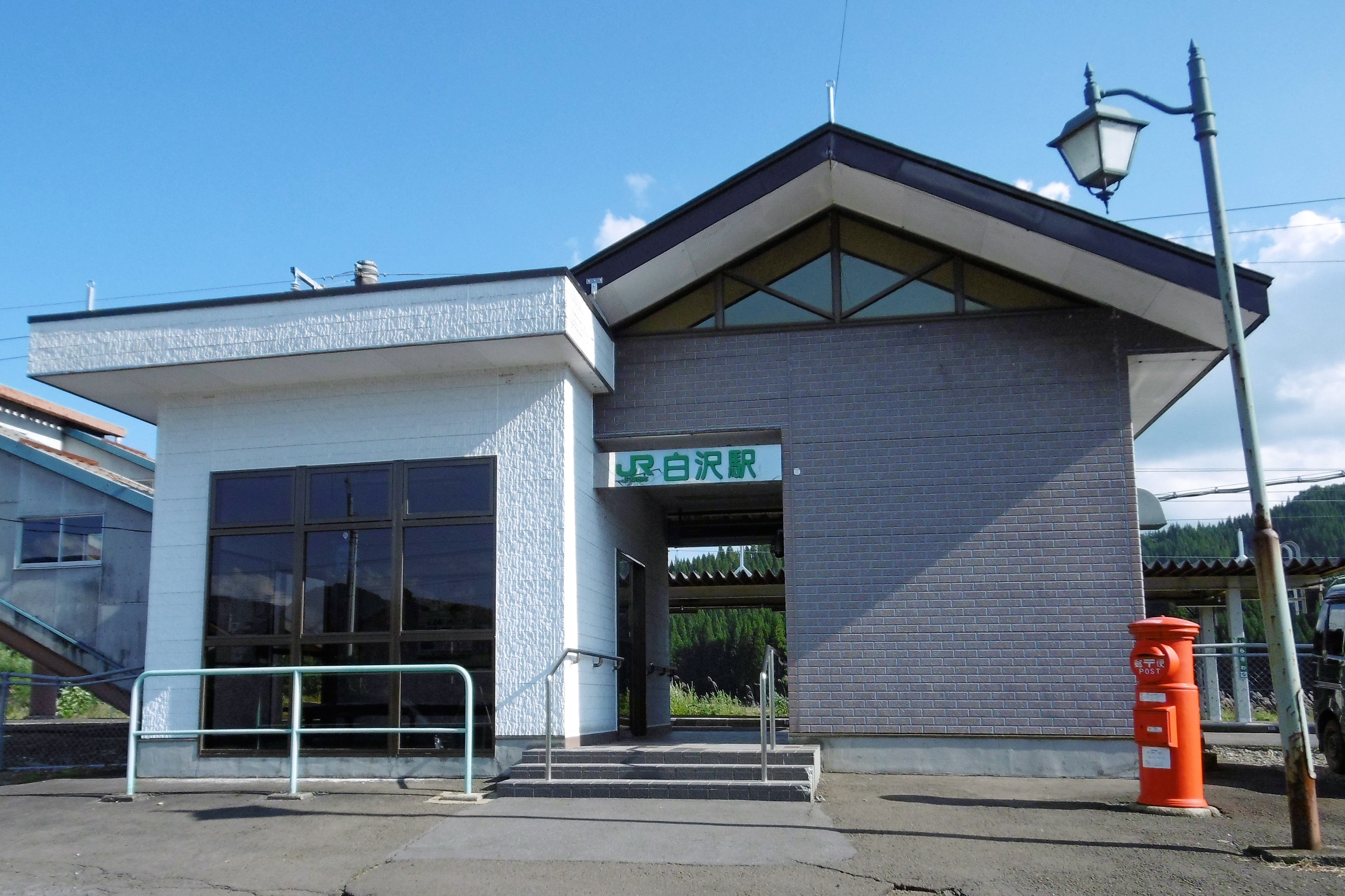
- Shirasawa Station (September 2017)

General information
- Location: 62 Shirasawa, Ōdate-shi, Akita-ken 017-0002; Japan
- Coordinates: 40°20′18.38″N 140°35′30.54″E
- Operator: JR East
- Line: ■ Ōu Main Line
- Distance: 409.4 kilometers from Fukushima
- Platforms: 1 side + 1 island platform

Other information
- Status: Unstaffed
- Website: Official website

History
- Opened: June 21, 1899

Services
Preceding station	JR East	Following station
Ōdate towards Shinjō	Ōu Main Line Local	Jimba towards Aomori
Location
- Location within Akita Prefecture Location within Japan

Shirasawa Station (白沢駅, Shirasawa-eki) is a railway station located in the city of Ōdate, Akita Prefecture, Japan, served by the East Japan Railway Company (JR East).

== Lines ==
Shirasawa Station is served by the Ōu Main Line, and is located 409.4 km from the terminus of the line at Fukushima.

== Station layout ==
The station consists of a single island platform and a single side platform serving three tracks, connected to the station building by a footbridge. However, Platform 3 is not in use. The station is unattended.

=== Platforms ===
1	■ Ōu Main Line	for Hirosaki and Aomori
2	■ Ōu Main Line	for Higashi-Noshiro and Akita
3	■ Ōu Main Line	not normally in service

== History ==
Shirasawa Station was opened on June 21, 1899 a station on the Japanese Government Railways (JGR), serving village of Yatate, Akita. The JGR became the Japan National Railways (JNR) after World War II. The station was absorbed into the JR East network upon the privatization of the JNR on April 1, 1987.

== Surrounding area ==
National Route 7

== See also ==
- List of railway stations in Japan
