= Tobe Dam =

Dam in Aomori Prefecture, Japan

- Location within Japan
- Location: Aomori Prefecture, Japan
- Coordinates: 40°25′37″N 140°38′58″E
- Construction began: 1968
- Opening date: 1974

Dam and spillways
- Height: 43 m (141 ft)
- Length: 158 m (518 ft)

Reservoir
- Total capacity: 1,420,000 m^{3} (50,000,000 cu ft)
- Catchment area: 8.3 km^{2} (3.2 sq mi)
- Surface area: 11 hectares (27 acres)

Tobe Dam is a gravity dam located in Aomori Prefecture in Japan. The dam is used for flood control. The catchment area of the dam is 8.3 km^{2}. The dam impounds about 11 ha of land when full and can store 1420 thousand cubic meters of water. The construction of the dam was started on 1968 and completed in 1974.
