= Komagome Dam =

Dam in Aomori Prefecture, Japan

- Location within Japan
- Location: Aomori Prefecture, Japan
- Coordinates: 40°42′34″N 140°53′09″E
- Construction began: 1982

Dam and spillways
- Height: 84.5 m (277 ft)
- Length: 290.1 m (952 ft)

Reservoir
- Total capacity: 7800 thousand cubic meters
- Catchment area: 55.9 sq. km
- Surface area: 38 hectares

Komagome Dam is a gravity dam located in Aomori Prefecture in Japan. The dam is used for flood control and power production. The catchment area of the dam is 55.9 km^{2}. The dam impounds about 38 ha of land when full and can store 7800 thousand cubic meters of water. The construction of the dam was started on 1982.
