= Shimizume Dam =

Dam in Aomori Prefecture, Japan

- Location within Japan
- Location: Aomori Prefecture, Japan
- Coordinates: 40°48′40″N 141°4′34″E
- Construction began: 1976
- Opening date: 2000

Dam and spillways
- Height: 33.5 m (110 ft)
- Length: 195 m (640 ft)

Reservoir
- Total capacity: 2,630,000 m^{3} (93,000,000 cu ft)
- Catchment area: 17 km^{2} (6.6 sq mi)
- Surface area: 29 hectares (72 acres)

Shimizume Dam is a gravity dam located in Aomori Prefecture in Japan. The dam is used for flood control. The catchment area of the dam is 17 km^{2}. The dam impounds about 29 ha of land when full and can store 2630 thousand cubic meters of water. The construction of the dam was started in 1976 and completed in 2000.
