= Ichinowatari Dam =

Dam in Aomori Prefecture, Japan

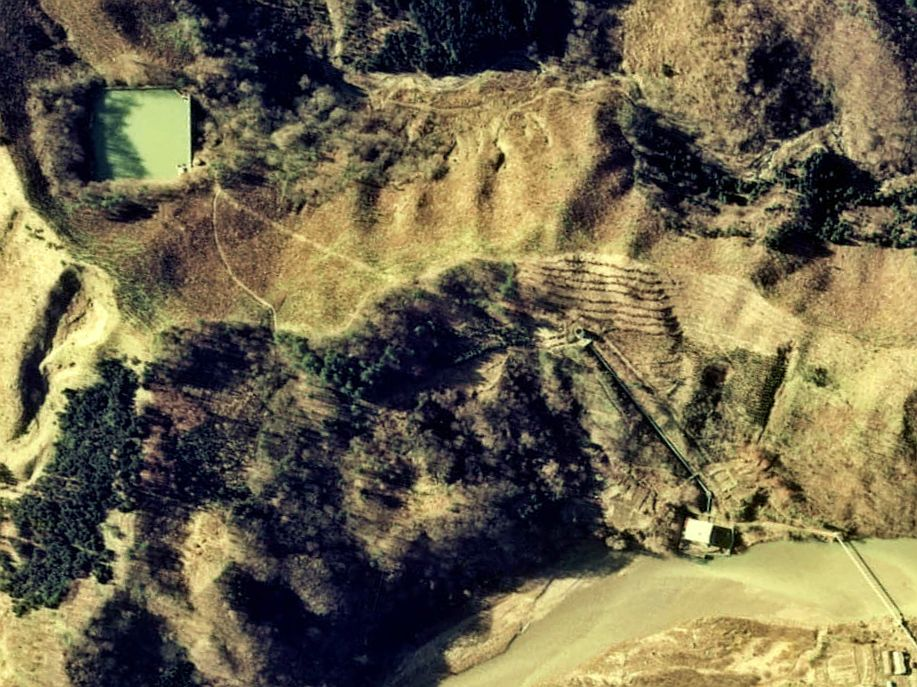

- Location within Japan
- Interactive map of Ichinowatari Dam
- Location: Aomori Prefecture, Japan
- Coordinates: 40°33′24″N 140°40′56″E
- Construction began: 1930
- Opening date: 1931

Dam and spillways
- Type of dam: Gravity
- Impounds: Fuka River tributary
- Height: 15.6 m (51 ft)
- Length: 65.5 m (215 ft)

Reservoir
- Total capacity: 28,000 m^{3} (990,000 cu ft)
- Catchment area: 129.2 km^{2} (49.9 sq mi)
- Surface area: 1 ha (2.5 acres)

Ichinowatari Dam is a gravity dam located in Aomori Prefecture in Japan. The dam is used for power production. The catchment area of the dam is 129.2 km^{2}. The dam impounds about 1 ha of land when full and can store 28 thousand cubic meters of water. The construction of the dam was started on 1930 and completed in 1931.
