= Tenma Dam =

Dam in Aomori Prefecture, Japan

- Location within Japan
- Location: Aomori Prefecture, Japan
- Coordinates: 40°47′18″N 141°3′51″E
- Construction began: 1960
- Opening date: 1970

Dam and spillways
- Height: 50.5 m (166 ft)
- Length: 202.8 m (665 ft)

Reservoir
- Total capacity: 19,584,000 m^{3} (691,600,000 cu ft)
- Catchment area: 63.5 km^{2} (24.5 sq mi)
- Surface area: 116 hectares (290 acres)

Tenma Dam is a gravity dam located in Aomori Prefecture in Japan. The dam is used for flood control and irrigation. The catchment area of the dam is 63.5 km^{2}. The dam impounds about 116 ha of land when full and can store 19584 thousand cubic meters of water. The construction of the dam was started on 1960 and completed in 1970.
