= Ninokura Dam =

Dam in Aomori Prefecture, Japan

- Location within Japan
- Location: Aomori Prefecture, Japan
- Coordinates: 40°25′38″N 141°4′45″E
- Construction began: 1967
- Opening date: 1970

Dam and spillways
- Height: 37 m (121 ft)
- Length: 106 m (348 ft)

Reservoir
- Total capacity: 2810 thousand cubic meters
- Catchment area: 21.5 sq. km
- Surface area: 20 hectares

Ninokura Dam is an asphalt dam located in Aomori Prefecture in Japan. The dam is used for flood control. The catchment area of the dam is 21.5 km^{2}. The dam impounds about 20 ha of land when full and can store 2810 thousand cubic meters of water. The construction of the dam was started on 1967 and completed in 1970.
