= Shiwa Dam =

Dam in Aomori Prefecture, Japan

- Location within Japan
- Location: Aomori Prefecture, Japan
- Coordinates: 40°29′59″N 141°6′16″E
- Construction began: 1950
- Opening date: 1961

Dam and spillways
- Height: 22.8 m (75 ft)
- Length: 121.2 m (398 ft)

Reservoir
- Total capacity: 825,000 m^{3} (29,100,000 cu ft)
- Catchment area: 22.9 km^{2} (8.8 sq mi)
- Surface area: 11 hectares (27 acres)

Shiwa Dam is an earthfill dam located in Aomori Prefecture in Japan. The dam is used for flood control. The catchment area of the dam is 22.9 km^{2}. The dam impounds about 11 ha of land when full and can store 825 thousand cubic meters of water. The construction of the dam was started on 1950 and completed in 1961.
