= Hayaseno Dam =

Dam in Aomori Prefecture, Japan

- Location within Japan
- Interactive map of Hayaseno Dam
- Location: Aomori Prefecture, Japan
- Coordinates: 40°28′02″N 140°32′42″E
- Construction began: 1968
- Opening date: 1985

Dam and spillways
- Type of dam: Embankment
- Impounds: Nijikai River
- Height: 56 m (184 ft)
- Length: 285.9 m (938 ft)

Reservoir
- Total capacity: 13,500,000 m^{3} (480,000,000 cu ft)
- Catchment area: 22.8 km^{2} (8.8 sq mi)
- Surface area: 75 ha (190 acres)

Hayaseno Dam is a rockfill dam located in Aomori Prefecture in Japan. The dam is used for irrigation. The catchment area of the dam is 22.8 km^{2}. The dam impounds about 75 ha of land when full and can store 13,500,000 cubic meters of water. The construction of the dam was started on 1968 and completed in 1985.
