= Hongo Dam =

Dam in Aomori Prefecture, Japan

- Location within Japan
- Interactive map of Hongo Dam
- Location: Aomori Prefecture, Japan
- Coordinates: 40°41′28″N 140°38′13″E
- Construction began: 1950
- Opening date: 1956

Dam and spillways
- Type of dam: Embankment
- Height: 21.8 m (72 ft)
- Length: 84.5 m (277 ft)

Reservoir
- Total capacity: 200,000 m^{3} (7,100,000 cu ft)
- Catchment area: 7.8 km^{2} (3.0 sq mi)
- Surface area: 4 ha (9.9 acres)

Hongo Dam is an earthfill dam located in Aomori Prefecture in Japan. The dam is used for irrigation. The catchment area of the dam is 7.8 km^{2}. The dam impounds about 4 ha of land when full and can store 200 thousand cubic meters of water. The construction of the dam was started on 1950 and completed in 1956.
