= Sashikubo Dam =

Dam in Aomori Prefecture, Japan

- Location within Japan
- Location: Aomori Prefecture, Japan
- Coordinates: 40°29′52″N 141°8′47″E
- Construction began: 1985
- Opening date: 2011

Dam and spillways
- Height: 37.8 m (124 ft)
- Length: 200 m (660 ft)

Reservoir
- Total capacity: 2,922,000 m^{3} (103,200,000 cu ft)
- Catchment area: 28.4 km^{2} (11.0 sq mi)
- Surface area: 24 hectares (59 acres)

Sashikubo Dam is a rockfill dam located in Aomori Prefecture in Japan. The dam is used for irrigation. The catchment area of the dam is 28.4 km^{2}. The dam impounds about 24 ha of land when full and can store 2922 thousand cubic meters of water. The construction of the dam was started on 1985 and completed in 2011.
