= Hisayoshi Dam =

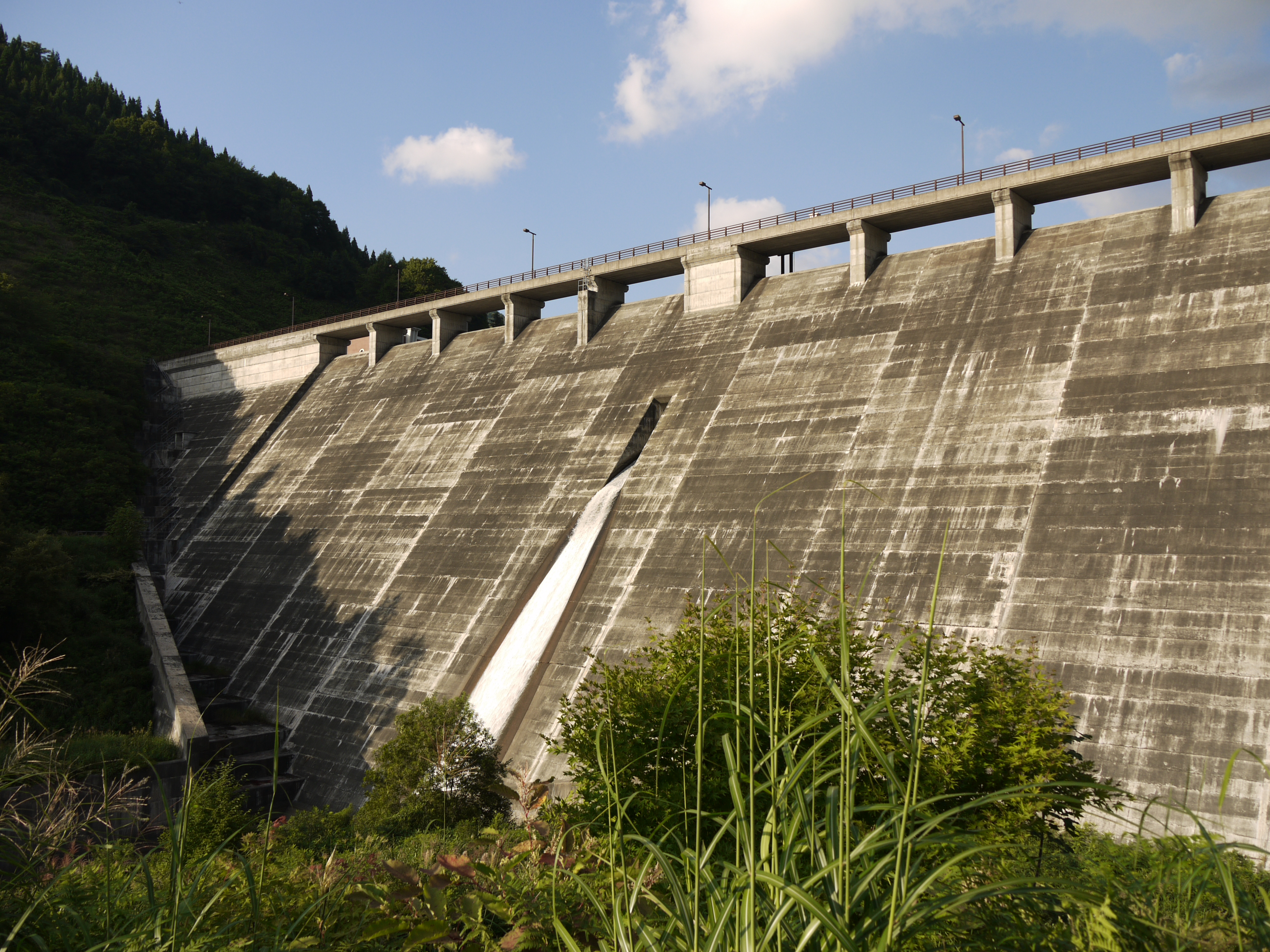
- Official name: 久吉ダム
- Country: Japan
- Location: Hirakawa, Aomori Japan
- Coordinates: 40°26′33″N 140°41′31″E
- Purpose: FNW
- Status: Operational
- Construction began: 1980
- Opening date: 1995
- Built by: Obayashi Corporation
- Operator(s): Aomori Prefecture

Dam and spillways
- Type of dam: Gravity dam
- Impounds: Hirakawa River
- Height: 57 meters
- Length: 317 meters

Reservoir
- Creates: Lake Omokage
- Total capacity: 6,730,000 m³
- Active capacity: 6,070,000 m³
- Catchment area: 21.8 km²
- Surface area: 41 hectares

The Hisayoshi Dam (久吉ダム, Hisayoshi damu) is a dam located in the city of Hirakawa, Aomori Prefecture in the Tohoku region of Japan.

The dam is a concrete gravity dam across the Hirakawa River, a tributary of the Iwaki River. Construction on the dam was begun in 1980 by a consortium led by the Obayashi Corporation, and the dams as completed in 1995. across the Kodomari River. It is a multipurpose dam to provide water for irrigation, flood control and drinking water.
