= Tanosawa Tameike Dam =

Dam in Aomori Prefecture, Japan

Tanosawa Tameike
- Location within Japan
- Location: Aomori Prefecture, Japan
- Coordinates: 40°53′54″N 140°59′28″E
- Construction began: 1932
- Opening date: 1945

Dam and spillways
- Height: 21 m (69 ft)
- Length: 205 m (673 ft)

Reservoir
- Total capacity: 1,174,000 m^{3} (41,500,000 cu ft)
- Catchment area: 0.8 km^{2} (0.31 sq mi)
- Surface area: 10 hectares (25 acres)

Tanosawa Tameike is an earthfill dam located in Aomori Prefecture in Japan. The dam is used for irrigation. The catchment area of the dam is 0.8 km^{2}. The dam impounds about 10 ha of land when full and can store 1174 thousand cubic meters of water. The construction of the dam was started on 1932 and completed in 1945.
