= Akaishi Dam =

Dam in Aomori Prefecture, Japan

- Location within Japan
- Location: Aomori Prefecture, Japan
- Coordinates: 40°32′08″N 140°6′40″E
- Construction began: 1953
- Opening date: 1955

Dam and spillways
- Type of dam: Gravity
- Impounds: Akaishi River
- Height: 23.1 m (76 ft)
- Length: 50.5 m (166 ft)

Reservoir
- Total capacity: 831,000 m^{3} (29,300,000 cu ft)
- Catchment area: 45.6 km^{2} (17.6 sq mi)
- Surface area: 12 ha (30 acres)

Akaishi Dam is a gravity dam located in Aomori Prefecture in Japan. The dam is used for power production. The catchment area of the dam is 45.6 km^{2}. The dam impounds about 12 ha of land when full and can store 831 thousand cubic meters of water. The construction of the dam was started on 1953 and completed in 1955.
