= Nishonai Dam =

Dam in Aomori Prefecture, Japan

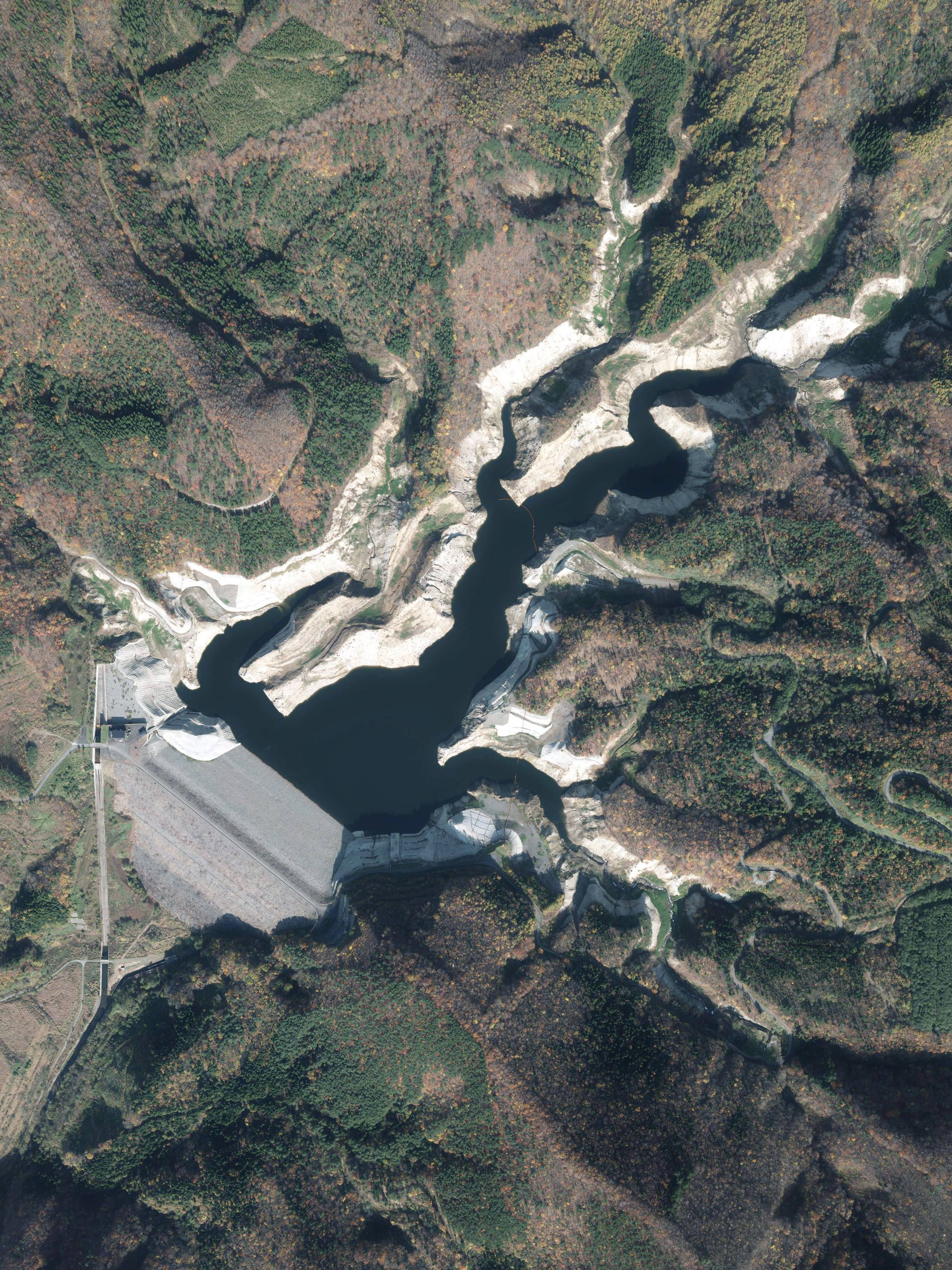

- Location within Japan
- Location: Aomori Prefecture, Japan
- Coordinates: 40°35′17″N 140°43′43″E
- Construction began: 1973
- Opening date: 1995

Dam and spillways
- Height: 86 m (282 ft)
- Length: 430.8 m (1,413 ft)

Reservoir
- Total capacity: 15,600,000 m^{3} (550,000,000 cu ft)
- Catchment area: 31.9 km^{2} (12.3 sq mi)
- Surface area: 65 hectares (160 acres)

Nishonai Dam is a rockfill dam located in Aomori Prefecture in Japan. It is used for irrigation and as an industrial water dam. The catchment area of the dam is 31.9 km^{2}. The dam impounds about 65 ha of land when full and can store 15 600 000 m³ of water. It is 86 metres tall and has a width of 430.8 m. The construction of the dam was started in 1973 and completed in 1995.
