= Natsusaka Dam =

Dam in Aomori Prefecture, Japan

- Location within Japan
- Location: Aomori Prefecture, Japan
- Coordinates: 40°17′29″N 140°59′21″E
- Construction began: 1960
- Opening date: 1966

Dam and spillways
- Height: 27.5 m (90 ft)
- Length: 141 m (463 ft)

Reservoir
- Total capacity: 810 thousand cubic meters
- Catchment area: 19.8 sq. km
- Surface area: 12 hectares

Natsusaka Dam is a gravity dam located in Aomori Prefecture in Japan. The dam is used for flood control. The catchment area of the dam is 19.8 km^{2}. The dam impounds about 12 ha of land when full and can store 810 thousand cubic meters of water. The construction of the dam was started on 1960 and completed in 1966.
