= Hirakawa, Aomori =

Hirakawa 平川市
- City
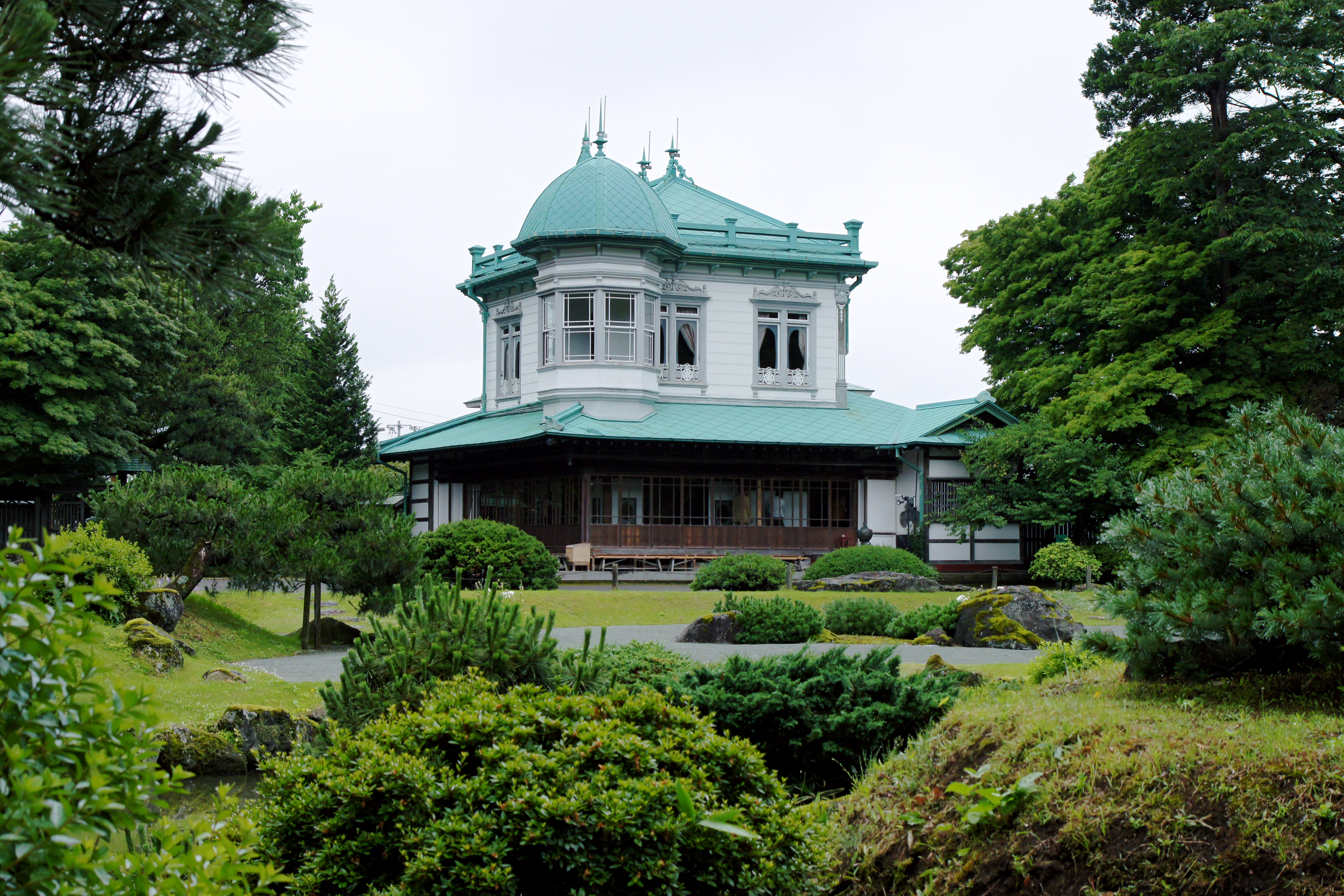
- Seibi-en

- Flag Seal
- Interactive map of Hirakawa
- Coordinates: 40°35′2.8″N 140°33′59.3″E
- Country: Japan
- Region: Tōhoku
- Prefecture: Aomori
- Ikarigaseki and Onoue village settled: April 1, 1889
- Onoue town settled: April 1, 1937
- Hiraga town settled: March 1, 1955
- Current Hirakawa city merged: January 1, 2006

Government
  - Mayor: Takahiro Kudō (工藤貴弘) - from December 2025

Area
  - Total: 346.01 km^{2} (133.60 sq mi)

Population (January 31, 2023)
  - Total: 30,086
  - Density: 86.951/km^{2} (225.20/sq mi)
- Time zone: UTC+9 (Japan Standard Time)
- Phone number: 0172-44-1111
- Address: 25-6 Kashiwagichō Fujiwara, Hirakawa-shi, Aomori-ken 036-0104
- Website: Official website
- Symbols
- Bird: Oriental turtle dove (Streptopelia orientalis)
- Flower: Indian lotus (Nelumbo nucifera)
- Tree: Japanese black pine

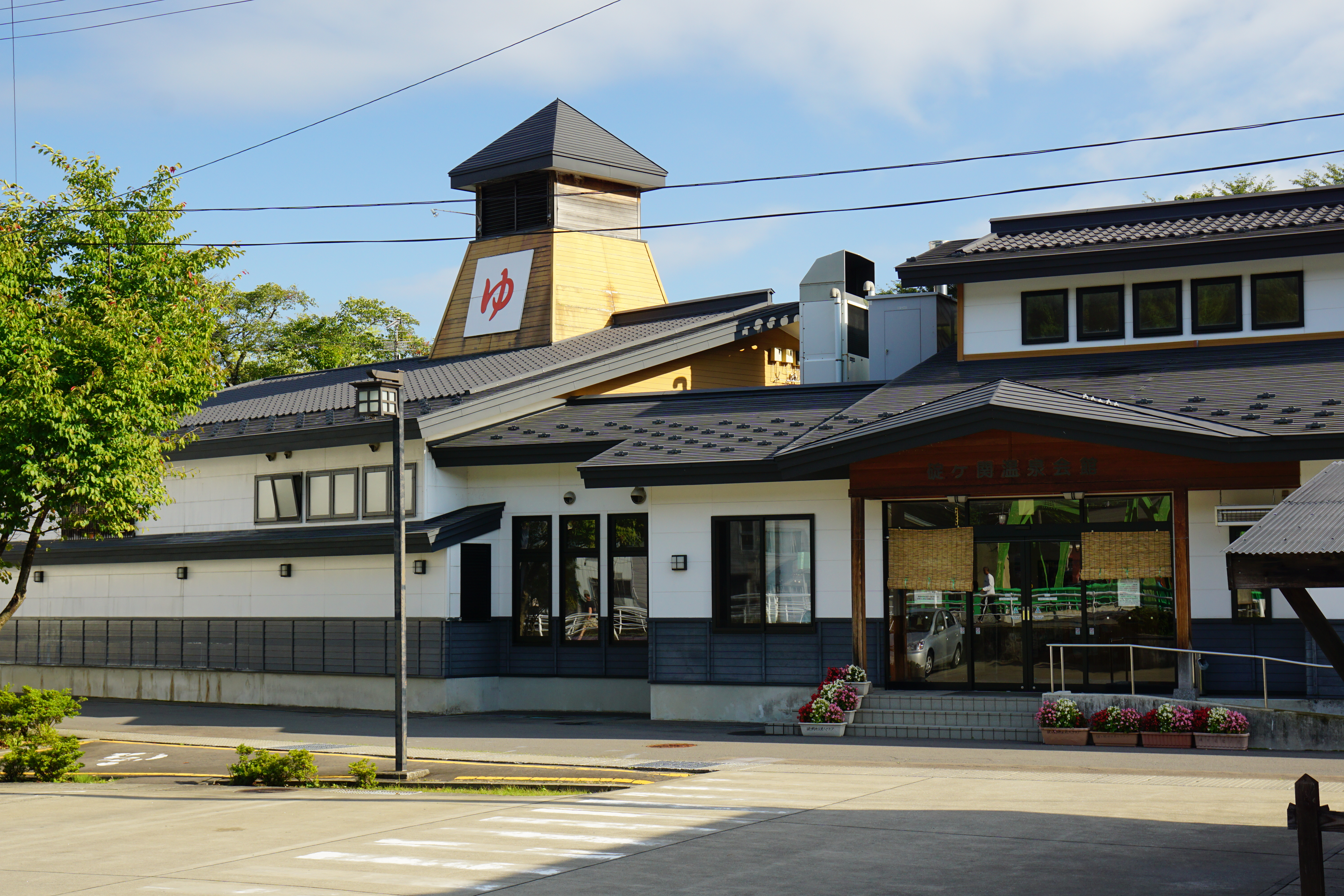
Ikarigaseki Onsen

Hirakawa (平川市, Hirakawa-shi) is a city located in Aomori Prefecture, Japan. As of 31 January 2023, the city had an estimated population of 30,086 in 14,181 households, and a population density of 89 persons per km^{2}. The total area of the city is 346.01 square kilometres (133.60 sq mi).

== Geography ==
Hirakawa is located in the mountains and hills to the northwest of Lake Towada. The Iwaki River flows through the city. Part of the city is within the borders of the Kuroishi Onsenkyō Prefectural Natural Park.

=== Neighbouring municipalities ===
Akita Prefecture

- Kosaka
- Ōdate

Aomori Prefecture

- Aomori
- Hirosaki
- Inakadate
- Kuroishi
- Owani
- Towada

== Climate ==
The city has a cold humid continental climate (Köppen Dfa) characterized by warm short summers and long cold winters with heavy snowfall. The average annual temperature in Hirakawa is 8.8 °C. The average annual rainfall is 1413 mm with September as the wettest month. The temperatures are highest on average in August, at around 22.5 °C, and lowest in January, at around -3.8 °C.

Climate data for Ikarigaseki, Hirakawa (elevation 135 m, 1991–2020 normals, extremes 1976–present)
Month	Jan	Feb	Mar	Apr	May	Jun	Jul	Aug	Sep	Oct	Nov	Dec	Year
Record high °C (°F)	10.5 (50.9)	15.6 (60.1)	22.5 (72.5)	29.2 (84.6)	31.8 (89.2)	33.0 (91.4)	36.1 (97.0)	37.9 (100.2)	34.1 (93.4)	27.2 (81.0)	21.7 (71.1)	15.8 (60.4)	37.9 (100.2)
Mean daily maximum °C (°F)	0.4 (32.7)	1.5 (34.7)	5.6 (42.1)	13.3 (55.9)	19.6 (67.3)	23.4 (74.1)	26.6 (79.9)	28.0 (82.4)	24.0 (75.2)	17.4 (63.3)	10.0 (50.0)	3.0 (37.4)	14.4 (57.9)
Daily mean °C (°F)	−3.0 (26.6)	−2.4 (27.7)	1.0 (33.8)	7.3 (45.1)	13.5 (56.3)	17.7 (63.9)	21.6 (70.9)	22.6 (72.7)	18.3 (64.9)	11.6 (52.9)	5.1 (41.2)	−0.6 (30.9)	9.4 (48.9)
Mean daily minimum °C (°F)	−6.9 (19.6)	−6.8 (19.8)	−3.4 (25.9)	1.8 (35.2)	7.8 (46.0)	12.8 (55.0)	17.5 (63.5)	18.4 (65.1)	13.5 (56.3)	6.5 (43.7)	0.9 (33.6)	−4.1 (24.6)	4.8 (40.6)
Record low °C (°F)	−16.7 (1.9)	−17.2 (1.0)	−13.5 (7.7)	−8.4 (16.9)	−1.2 (29.8)	1.4 (34.5)	7.9 (46.2)	9.1 (48.4)	3.6 (38.5)	−1.9 (28.6)	−8.0 (17.6)	−15.6 (3.9)	−17.2 (1.0)
Average precipitation mm (inches)	112.0 (4.41)	101.1 (3.98)	110.8 (4.36)	111.0 (4.37)	106.0 (4.17)	97.3 (3.83)	164.0 (6.46)	209.4 (8.24)	163.1 (6.42)	137.4 (5.41)	157.6 (6.20)	141.7 (5.58)	1,620.8 (63.81)
Average snowfall cm (inches)	192 (76)	165 (65)	110 (43)	5 (2.0)	0 (0)	0 (0)	0 (0)	0 (0)	0 (0)	0 (0)	19 (7.5)	133 (52)	621 (244)
Average precipitation days (≥ 1.0 mm)	18.7	17.0	16.1	13.1	11.5	9.8	11.6	12.0	11.9	13.4	16.7	19.4	171.2
Mean monthly sunshine hours	47.1	64.2	108.5	164.0	178.4	155.7	131.2	159.3	137.9	133.8	86.9	54.9	1,401.9
Source: Japan Meteorological Agency (1991–2020 normals, extremes 1976–present)

== History ==
The area around Hirakawa was part of the Hirosaki Domain of the Tsugaru clan during the Edo period. After the Meiji Restoration, with the establishment of the modern municipalities system on April 1, 1889, it became part of Minamitsugaru District, Aomori. The village of Onoe was raised to town status on April 1, 1937. The city of Hirakawa was established on January 1, 2006, from the merger of the towns of Hiraka and Onoe, and the village of Ikarigaseki.

== Demographics ==
Per Japanese census data, the population of Hirakawa has decreased steadily over the past 60 years.

Historical population
Year	Pop.	±% p.a.
1960	42,492	—
1970	39,360	−0.76%
1980	38,979	−0.10%
1990	37,948	−0.27%
2000	36,454	−0.40%
2010	33,764	−0.76%
2020	30,567	−0.99%

== Government ==
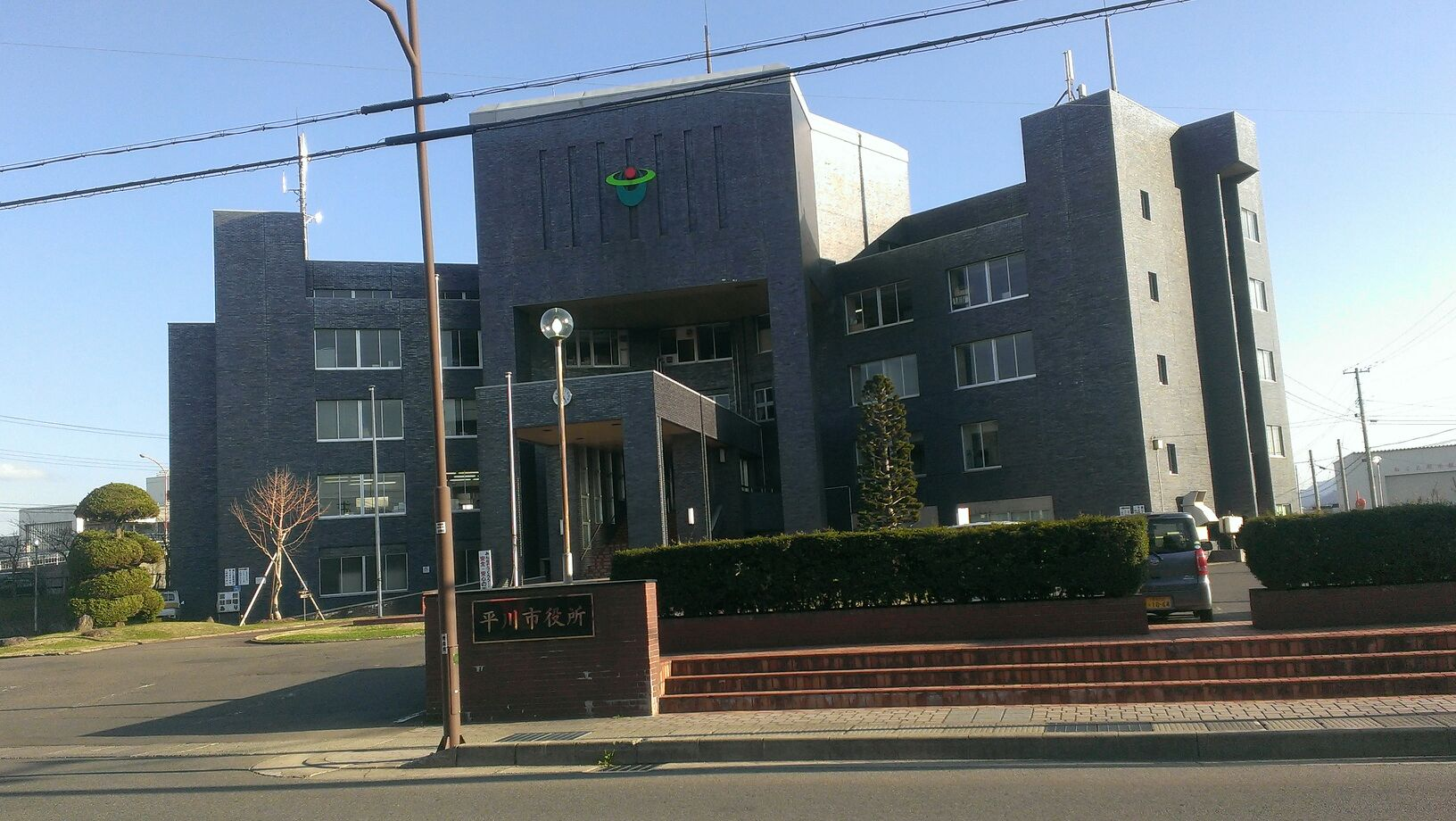
Hirakawa city hall

Hirakawa has a mayor-council form of government with a directly elected mayor and a unicameral city legislature of 16 members. The city elects two members to the Aomori Prefectural Assembly. In terms of national politics, the city is part of Aomori 3rd district of the lower house of the Diet of Japan.

== Economy ==
The economy of Hirakawa is primarily agricultural, with rice and apples as the predominant crops. The city government is encouraging the development of highland vegetables and a local brand of beef.

== Education ==
Hirakawa has nine public elementary schools and four public junior high schools operated by the city government, and two public high schools operated by the Aomori Prefectural Board of Education.

== Transportation ==
=== Railway ===
East Japan Railway Company (JR East) - Ōu Main Line

- Tsugaru-Yunosawa, Ikarigaseki

Kōnan Railway Company - Kōnan Railway Kōnan Line

- Tachita, Hiraka, Hakunōkōkōmae, Tsugaru-Onoe, Onoekōkōmae

=== Highway ===
- Tōhoku Expressway

National Route 7
National Route 102
National Route 182
National Route 454

== Local attractions ==
- Hisayoshi Dam
- Ikarigaseki onsen
- Kuroishi Onsenkyō Prefectural Natural Park
- Nurukawa onsen
- Saruka Jinja
- Seibi-en, National Place of Scenic Beauty
- Seitō Shoin Teien, National Place of Scenic Beauty
