= Odagawa Dam =

Dam in Aomori Prefecture, Japan

- Location within Japan
- Location: Aomori Prefecture, Japan
- Coordinates: 40°53′19″N 140°32′26″E
- Construction began: 1971
- Opening date: 1975

Dam and spillways
- Height: 31 m (102 ft)
- Length: 203 m (666 ft)

Reservoir
- Total capacity: 9,700,000 m^{3} (340,000,000 cu ft)
- Catchment area: 16 km^{2} (6.2 sq mi)
- Surface area: 87 hectares (210 acres)

Odagawa Dam is a rockfill dam located in Aomori Prefecture in Japan. The dam is used for irrigation. The catchment area of the dam is 16 km^{2} (6.2 sq mi). The dam impounds about 87 ha (210 acres) of land when full and can store 9700 thousand cubic meters of water. The construction of the dam was started in 1971 and completed in 1975.
