= Minamitsugaru District, Aomori =

District in Aomori prefecture, Japan

Coordinates: 40°28′30″N 140°32′53″E

- Japan > Tōhoku region > Aomori Prefecture > Minamitsugaru District

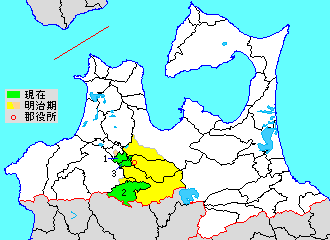
Map showing original extent of Minamitsugaru District in Aomori Prefecture green - current yellow - former extent in early Meiji period: 1. - Fujisaki; 2. – Ōwani; 3. - Inakadate

Minamitsugaru District (南津軽郡, Minamitsugaru-gun) is a rural district located in Aomori Prefecture, Japan.

As of September 2013, the district had an estimated population of 33,815 and an area of 222.98 km^{2}. All of the cities of Kuroishi and Hirakawa, and parts of the cities of Aomori and Hirosaki and the town of Itayanagi were formerly part of Minamitsugaru District. In terms of national politics, the district is represented in the Diet of Japan's House of Representatives as a part of the Aomori 3rd district.

== Towns and villages ==
- Fujisaki
- Inakadate
- Ōwani

== History ==
The area of Minamitsugaru District was formerly part of Mutsu Province. At the time of the Meiji restoration of 1868, the area consisted of one towns (Kuroishi) and 22 villages formerly under the control of Kuroishi Domain and 117 villages under the control of Hirosaki Domain. Aomori Prefecture was founded on December 13, 1871, and Minamitsugaru District was carved out of the former Tsugaru District on October 30, 1878.

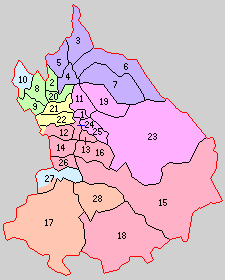
Historic Map of Minamitsugaru District: 1.Kuroishi 2.Tomikidate 3. Ōsugi 4.Megasawa 5.Nozawa 6.Namioka 7.Gogō 8.Junisato 9.Fujisaki 10.Hataoka 11.Nakagō 12.Saruga 13.Kanata 14.Daikōji 15.Takedate 16.Ōsaki 17.Ōwani 18.Ikarigaseki 19.Rokugō 20.Tokiwa 21.Kōdenji 22.Inakadate 23.Yamasugi 24.Onoe 25.Aseishi 26.Kashiwagi 27.Ishikawa 28.Kuradate Purple=to Aomori City, Pink=Kuroishi, Red=Hirakawa, Yellow=Inakadate, Green=Fujisaki, Orange= Ōwani, Light Blue (upper)=to Kitatsugaru District, Light Blue (lower)=to Hirosaki City

With the establishment of the municipality system on April 1, 1889, Minamitsugaru District, was organized into one town (Kuroishi) and 27 villages were established.

- 1923 – Ishikawa, Ōwani and Fujisaki were elevated to town status.
- 1929 – Kashiwagi was elevated to town status.
- 1937 – Onoe was elevated to town status.
- 1940 – Namioka was elevated to town status.
- 1943 – Daikoji was elevated to town status.
- 1951 – Kuradate was elevated to town status.
- 1954 – Kuroishi merged with four neighboring villages and was elevated to city status. Kuradate merged with Ōwani.
- 1955 – Hiraga Town was created by the merger of Kashiwagi, Daikoji and three villages. Hataoka villages was transferred to Kitatsugaru District.
- 1957 – The town of Ishikawa was absorbed into Kuroishi
- On March 28, 2005, the village of Tokiwa merged into the town of Fujisaki.
- On April 1, 2005, the town of Namioka merged into the city of Aomori.
- On January 1, 2006, the towns of Hiraka and Onoe and the village of Ikarigaseki merged to form the new city of Hirakawa.
