= Shimoyu Dam =

Dam in Aomori Prefecture, Japan

- Location within Japan
- Location: Aomori Prefecture, Japan
- Coordinates: 40°41′30″N 140°46′44″E
- Construction began: 1971
- Opening date: 1988

Dam and spillways
- Height: 70 m (230 ft)
- Length: 783.5 m (2,571 ft)

Reservoir
- Total capacity: 12,600,000 m^{3} (440,000,000 cu ft)
- Catchment area: 63.7 km^{2} (24.6 sq mi)
- Surface area: 63 hectares (160 acres)

Shimoyu Dam is a rockfill dam located in Aomori Prefecture in Japan. The dam is used for flood control and water supply. The catchment area of the dam is 63.7 km^{2}. The dam impounds about 63 ha of land when full and can store 12600 thousand cubic meters of water. The construction of the dam was started on 1971 and completed in 1988.
