= Hiraka, Aomori =

Hiraka 平賀町
- Former municipality
- Flag Emblem

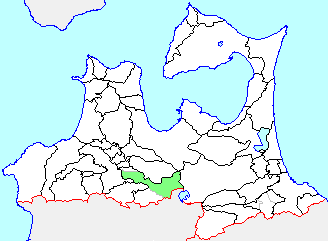
- Location of Hiraka in Aomori Prefecture

- Location in Japan
- Coordinates: 40°35′1.7″N 140°33′59.2″E
- Country: Japan
- Region: Tōhoku
- Prefecture: Aomori Prefecture
- District: Minamitsugaru
- Merged: January 1, 2006 (now part of Hirakawa)

Area
  - Total: 221.61 km^{2} (85.56 sq mi)

Population (January 1, 2006)
  - Total: 22,053
  - Density: 99.5/km^{2} (258/sq mi)
- Time zone: UTC+09:00 (JST)
- Symbols
- Bird: Copper pheasant
- Flower: Apple
- Tree: Sakura

Hiraka (平賀町, Hiraka-machi) was a town located in Minamitsugaru District in central Aomori Prefecture, Japan.

Hiraka was founded on March 1, 1955 through the merger of the towns of Taikoji and Kashiwagi with the villages of Takedate, Ozaki and Machiya.

On January 1, 2006, Hiraka, along with the town of Onoe, and the village of Ikarigaseki (all from Minamitsugaru District), was merged to create the new city of Hirakawa, and thus no longer exists as an independent municipality.

An inland village, Hiraka had an agriculture-based economy and was noted for its production of apples. At the time of its merger, Hiraka had an estimated population of 22,053 and a population density of 99.5 persons per km^{2}. The total area was 221.61 km^{2}.

Hiraka was served by Japan National Route 102 and Japan National Route 454 highways, as well as by four stations on the Kōnan Railway Kōnan Line.
