= Shinkodoroku Dam =

Dam in Aomori Prefecture, Japan

- Location within Japan
- Location: Aomori Prefecture, Japan
- Coordinates: 40°46′02″N 140°19′47″E
- Opening date: 1967

Dam and spillways
- Height: 23.8 m (78 ft)
- Length: 294 m (965 ft)

Reservoir
- Total capacity: 1,750,000 m^{3} (62,000,000 cu ft)
- Catchment area: 24.1 km^{2} (9.3 sq mi)
- Surface area: 24 hectares (59 acres)

Shinkodoroku Dam is an earthfill dam located in Aomori Prefecture in Japan. The dam is used for flood control and irrigation. The catchment area of the dam is 24.1 km^{2}. The dam impounds about 24 ha of land when full and can store 1750 thousand cubic meters of water. The construction of the dam was completed in 1967.
