= Namioka, Aomori =

Namioka 浪岡町
- Former municipality
- Flag Seal

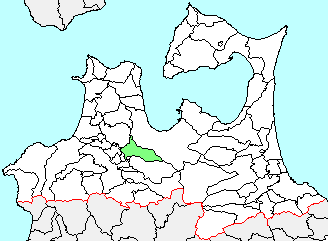
- Location of Namioka in Aomori Prefecture

- Location in Japan
- Coordinates: 40°42′N 140°35′E
- Country: Japan
- Region: Tōhoku
- Prefecture: Aomori Prefecture
- District: Minamitsugaru
- Merged: March 28, 2005 (now part of Aomori)

Area
  - Total: 132.13 km^{2} (51.02 sq mi)

Population (March 1, 2005)
  - Total: 20,543
  - Density: 155.48/km^{2} (402.7/sq mi)
- Time zone: UTC+09:00 (JST)
- Symbols
- Bird: Oriental turtle-dove
- Flower: Gentian
- Tree: Zelkova

Namioka (浪岡町, Namioka-machi) was a town located in Minamitsugaru District in central Aomori Prefecture, Japan.

Namioka Town was located in the plains of central Aomori Prefecture, bordered by the Ōu Mountains to the east. The area was part of Hirosaki Domain during the Edo period. In 1889, after the Meiji Restoration, Namioka Village was created on April 1, 1889. It was elevated to town status on June 1, 1940. It annexed the four neighboring villages of Megasawa, Osugi, Nozawa and Gogo on December 15, 1954, and annexed a portion of Nanawa Village from Kitatsugaru District in 1956.

On April 1, 2005, Namioka was merged with the neighboring and expanded city of Aomori, and thus no longer exists as an independent municipality.

The merger was very controversial; after the agreement was made with the city of Aomori and the Aomori Prefectural Parliament had approved the change, strong objections were made by Namioka residents, who had not been consulted. The town mayor was recalled on December 26, 2004. A new mayor was elected on February 13, 2005, who indicated his opposition to the merger. On March 27, 2005, a referendum was held showing strong opposition to the plan, but five days later the merger went into effect in accordance with the previously settled agreement.

At the time of its merger, Namioka had an estimated population of 20,543 and a density of 155.48 persons per km^{2}. The total area was 15.19 km^{2}.

== Noted residents of Namioka ==
- Takanosato Toshihide – sumo wrestler
- Bushūyama Takashi – sumo wrestler
