= Matakido Dam =

Dam in Aomori Prefecture, Japan

- Location within Japan
- Location: Aomori Prefecture, Japan
- Coordinates: 40°27′40″N 141°5′09″E
- Construction began: 1968
- Opening date: 1988

Dam and spillways
- Height: 34.6 m (114 ft)
- Length: 179.6 m (589 ft)

Reservoir
- Total capacity: 1236 thousand cubic meters
- Catchment area: 14.5 sq. km
- Surface area: 13 hectares

Matakido Dam is an earthfill dam located in Aomori Prefecture in Japan. The dam is used for flood control. The catchment area of the dam is 14.5 km^{2}. The dam impounds about 13 ha of land when full and can store 1236 thousand cubic meters of water. The construction of the dam was started on 1968 and completed in 1988.
