= Kawauchi Dam =

Dam in Aomori Prefecture, Japan

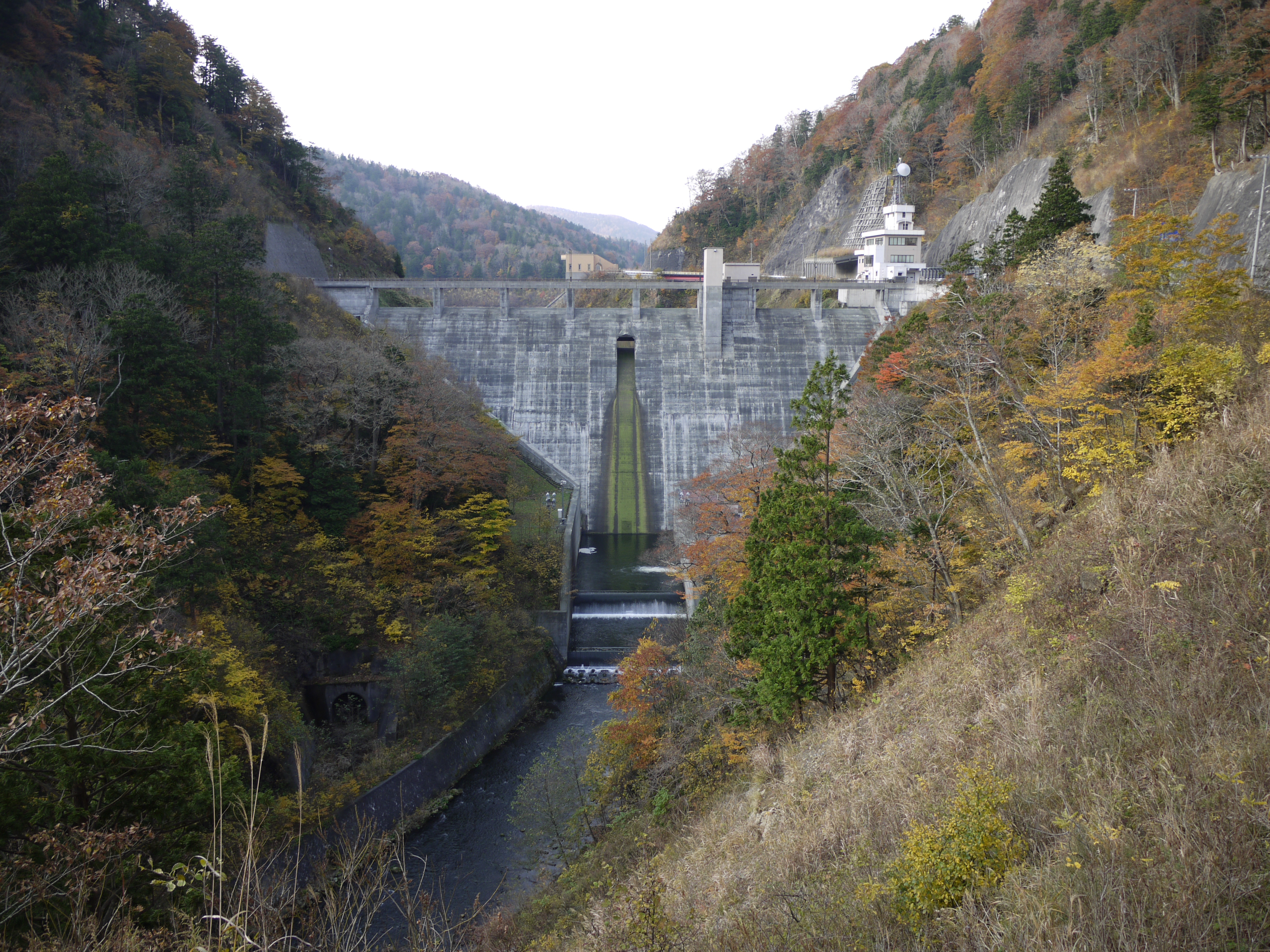

- Location within Japan
- Location: Aomori Prefecture, Japan
- Coordinates: 41°16′30″N 140°53′41″E
- Construction began: 1973
- Opening date: 1994

Dam and spillways
- Height: 55 m (180 ft)
- Length: 137 m (449 ft)

Reservoir
- Total capacity: 16500 thousand cubic meters
- Catchment area: 48 sq. km
- Surface area: 147 hectares

Kawauchi Dam is a gravity dam located in Aomori Prefecture in Japan. The dam is used for flood control. The catchment area of the dam is 48 km^{2}. The dam impounds about 147 ha of land when full and can store 16500 thousand cubic meters of water. The construction of the dam was started in 1973 and completed in 1994.
