= Sakuda Dam =

Dam in Aomori Prefecture, Japan

- Location within Japan
- Location: Aomori Prefecture, Japan
- Coordinates: 40°42′50″N 141°3′23″E
- Construction began: 1969
- Opening date: 1979

Dam and spillways
- Height: 31.5 m (103 ft)
- Length: 257 m (843 ft)

Reservoir
- Total capacity: 1,282,000 m^{3} (45,300,000 cu ft)
- Catchment area: 11 km^{2} (4.2 sq mi)
- Surface area: 15 hectares (37 acres)

Sakuda Dam is a rockfill dam located in Aomori Prefecture in Japan. The dam is used for flood control. The catchment area of the dam is 11 km^{2}. The dam impounds about 15 ha of land when full and can store 1282 thousand cubic meters of water. The construction of the dam was started on 1969 and completed in 1979.
