= Tsugaru-Yunosawa Station =

Railway station in Hirakawa, Aomori Prefecture, Japan

Tsugaru-Yunosawa Station 津軽湯の沢駅
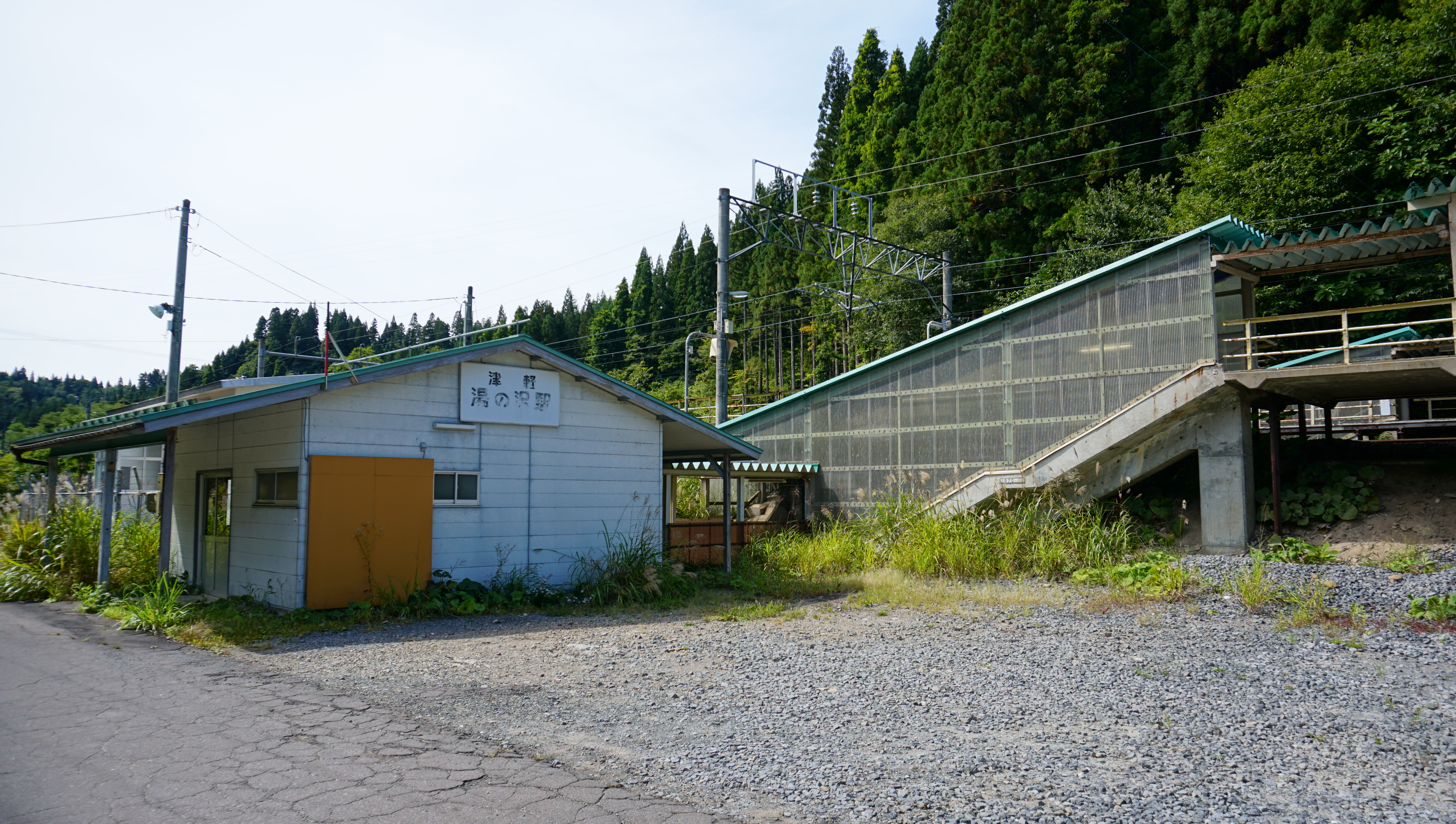
- Tsugaru-Yunosawa Station in September 2019

General information
- Location: Ikarigaseki,[Hirakawa-shi, Aomori-ken 038-0101; Japan
- Coordinates: 40°26′31.32″N 140°37′56.07″E
- Operator: JR East
- Line: ■ Ōu Main Line
- Distance: 422.3 km from Fukushima
- Platforms: 2 side platforms

Other information
- Status: Unstaffed
- Website: Official website

History
- Opened: June 1, 1949

Services
Preceding station	JR East	Following station
Jimba towards Shinjō	Ōu Main Line Local	Ikarigaseki towards Aomori
Location
- Location within Aomori Prefecture Location within Japan

Tsugaru-Yunosawa Station (津軽湯の沢駅, Tsugaru-Yunosawa eki) is a railway station on the northern Ōu Main Line in the city of Hirakawa, Aomori Prefecture, Japan, operated by East Japan Railway Company (JR East).

== Lines ==
Tsugaru-Yunosawa Station is served by the Ōu Main Line, and is located 422.3 km from the starting point of the line at Fukushima.

== Station layout ==
The station has two opposed side platforms located on an embankment, with station building located at a lower level. There is no connection between platforms, each of which has a separate exit.

=== Platforms ===
1	■ Ōu Main Line	for Higashi-Noshiro and Akita
2	■ Ōu Main Line	for Hirosaki and Aomori

== History ==
Tsugaru-Yunosawa Station was opened on June 1, 1949 as a station on the Japan National Railways (JNR). It has been unattended since October 1, 1971. With the privatization of the JNR on April 1, 1987, it came under the operational control of JR East.

== Surrounding area ==
- Yunosawa Onsen

National Route 7
National Route 282

== See also ==
- List of railway stations in Japan
