= Ikarigaseki Station =

Railway station in Hirakawa, Aomori Prefecture, Japan

Ikarigaseki Station 碇ヶ関駅
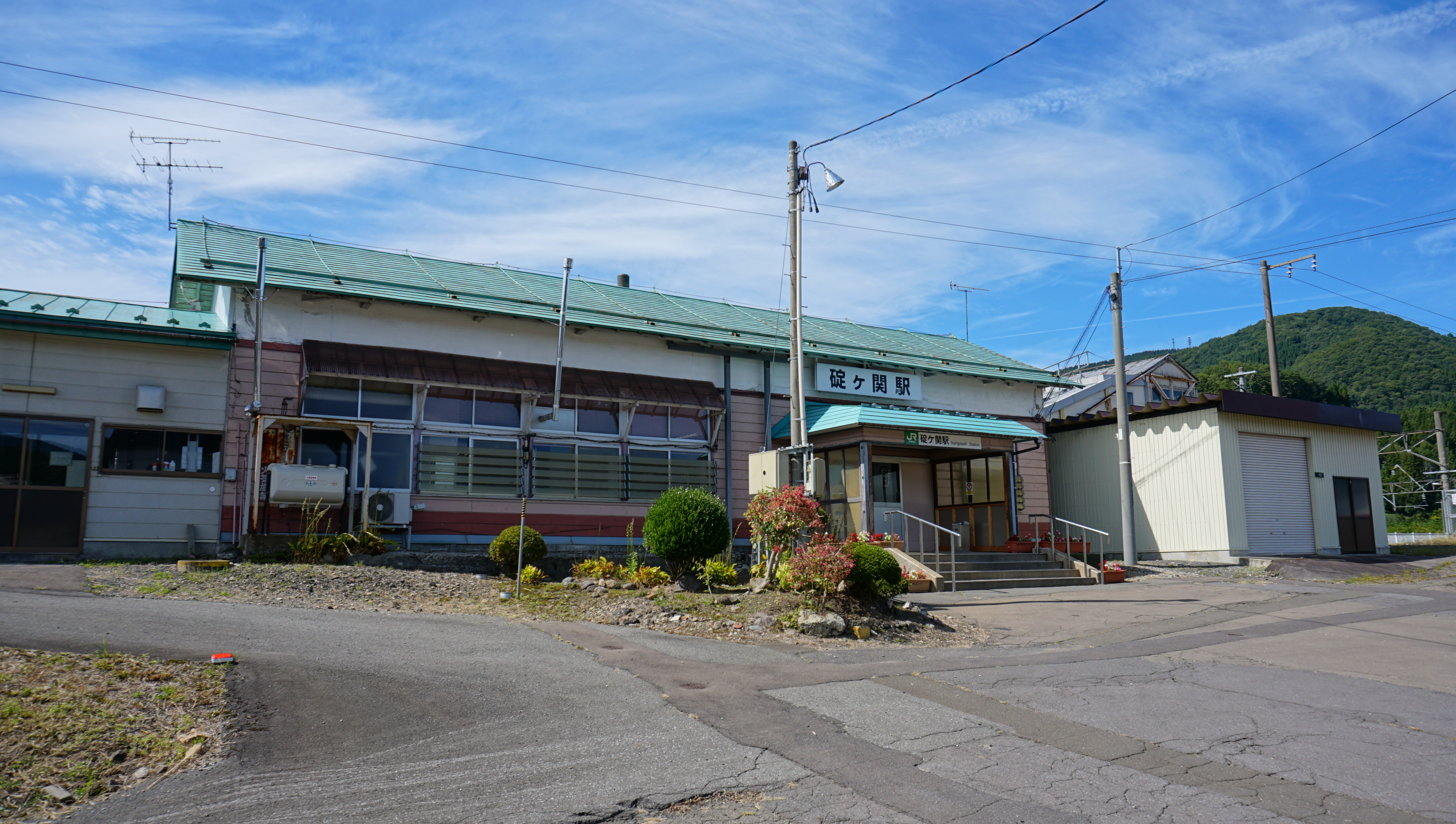
- Ikarigaseki Station in September 2019

General information
- Location: 13 Takada, Ikarigaseki, Hirakawa-shi, Aomori-ken 038-0101; Japan
- Coordinates: 40°28′46.19″N 140°37′20.39″E
- Operator: JR East
- Line: ■ Ōu Main Line
- Distance: 427.2 km from Fukushima
- Platforms: 1 side + 1 island platform

Other information
- Status: Staffed
- Website: Official website

History
- Opened: 21 October 1895

Passengers
- FY2015: 113 daily

Services
Preceding station	JR East	Following station
Ōdate towards Akita	Tsugaru	Ōwani-Onsen towards Aomori
Ōdate towards Akita	Ōu Main Line Rapid	Ōwani-Onsen towards Aomori
Tsugaru-Yunosawa towards Shinjō	Ōu Main Line Local	Nagamine towards Aomori
Location
- Location within Aomori Prefecture Location within Japan

Ikarigaseki Station (碇ヶ関駅, Ikarigaseki-eki) is a railway station on the northern Ōu Main Line in the city of Hirakawa, Aomori Prefecture, Japan, operated by East Japan Railway Company (JR East).

== Lines ==
Ikarigaseki Station is served by the Ōu Main Line, and is located 427.2 km from the starting point of the Ōu Main Line at Fukushima.

== Station layout ==
The station has one side platform and one island platform serving three tracks, connected to the station building by a footbridge. The station is staffed.

=== Platforms ===
1	■ Ōu Main Line	for Higashi-Noshiro and Akita
2	■ Ōu Main Line	(not normally used)
3	■ Ōu Main Line	for Hirosaki and Aomori

== History ==
Ikarigaseki Station was opened on 21 October 1895 as a station on the Japanese Government Railways system, which later became the Japanese National Railways (JNR). With the privatization of JNR on 1 April 1987, it came under the operational control of JR East.

== Passenger statistics ==
In fiscal 2015, the station was used by an average of 113 passengers daily (boarding passengers only).

== Surrounding area ==
- Ikarigasaki Post Office
- Former Ikarigaseki village hall
- Ikarigaseki Elementary School
- Ikarigaseki Junior High School

== See also ==
- List of railway stations in Japan
