= Asamushi Dam =

Dam in Aomori Prefecture, Japan

- Location within Japan
- Interactive map of Asamushi Dam
- Location: Aomori Prefecture, Japan
- Coordinates: 40°53′07″N 140°52′19″E
- Construction began: 1981
- Opening date: 2002

Dam and spillways
- Height: 9 m (30 ft)
- Length: 215 m (705 ft)

Reservoir
- Total capacity: 300 thousand cubic meters
- Catchment area: 5 sq. km
- Surface area: 4 hectares

Asamushi Dam is a gravity dam located in Aomori Prefecture in Japan. The dam is used for flood control. The catchment area of the dam is 5 km^{2}. The dam impounds about 4 ha of land when full and can store 300 thousand cubic meters of water. The construction of the dam was started on 1981 and completed in 2002.
