= Tsukari Dam =

Dam in Aomori Prefecture, Japan

- Location within Japan
- Location: Aomori Prefecture, Japan
- Coordinates: 40°26′36″N 140°40′23″E
- Construction began: 1951
- Opening date: 1962

Dam and spillways
- Height: 30.2 m (99 ft)
- Length: 268 m (879 ft)

Reservoir
- Total capacity: 451,000 m^{3} (15,900,000 cu ft)
- Catchment area: 23.3 km^{2} (9.0 sq mi)
- Surface area: 8 hectares (20 acres)

Tsukari Dam is an earthfill dam located in Aomori Prefecture in Japan. The dam is used for irrigation. The catchment area of the dam is 23.3 km^{2}. The dam impounds about 8 ha of land when full and can store 451 thousand cubic meters of water. The construction of the dam was started on 1951 and completed in 1962.
