= Iizume Dam =

Dam in Aomori Prefecture, Japan

- Location within Japan
- Interactive map of Iizume Dam
- Location: Aomori Prefecture, Japan
- Coordinates: 40°50′27″N 140°30′58″E
- Construction began: 1967
- Opening date: 1973

Dam and spillways
- Height: 38 m (125 ft)
- Length: 234 m (768 ft)

Reservoir
- Total capacity: 2380 thousand cubic meters
- Catchment area: 11.7 sq. km
- Surface area: 24 hectares

Iizume Dam is an earthfill dam located in Aomori Prefecture in Japan. The dam is used for flood control and water supply. The catchment area of the dam is 11.7 km^{2}. The dam impounds about 24 ha of land when full and can store 2380 thousand cubic meters of water. The construction of the dam was started on 1967 and completed in 1973.
