= Hanaki Dam =

Dam in Aomori Prefecture, Japan

- Location within Japan
- Interactive map of Hanaki Dam
- Location: Aomori Prefecture, Japan
- Coordinates: 40°15′18″N 141°0′30″E
- Construction began: 1966
- Opening date: 1972

Dam and spillways
- Height: 27 m (89 ft)
- Length: 125.8 m (413 ft)

Reservoir
- Total capacity: 576 thousand cubic meters
- Catchment area: 18.5 sq. km
- Surface area: 8 hectares

Hanaki Dam is a rockfill dam located in Aomori Prefecture in Japan. The dam is used for flood control. The catchment area of the dam is 18.5 km^{2}. The dam impounds about 8 ha of land when full and can store 576 thousand cubic meters of water. The construction of the dam was started on 1966 and completed in 1972.
