= Soma Dam =

Dam in Aomori Prefecture, Japan

- Location within Japan
- Location: Aomori Prefecture, Japan
- Coordinates: 40°33′16″N 140°18′55″E
- Construction began: 1974
- Opening date: 2003

Dam and spillways
- Height: 52.4 m (172 ft)
- Length: 222 m (728 ft)

Reservoir
- Total capacity: 6,560,000 m^{3} (232,000,000 cu ft)
- Catchment area: 25.9 km^{2} (10.0 sq mi)
- Surface area: 54 hectares (130 acres)

Soma Dam is a rockfill dam located in Aomori Prefecture in Japan. The dam is used for flood control and irrigation. The catchment area of the dam is 25.9 km^{2}. The dam impounds about 54 ha of land when full and can store 6560 thousand cubic meters of water. The construction of the dam was started on 1974 and completed in 2003.
