= Tokiwa, Aomori =

Tokiwa 常盤村
- Former municipality
- Flag Seal

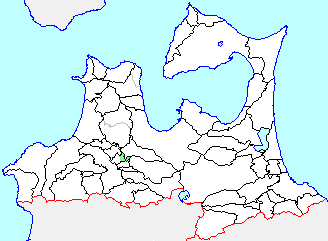
- Location of Tokiwa in Aomori Prefecture

- Location in Japan
- Coordinates: 40°40′33.5″N 140°42′36.3″E
- Country: Japan
- Region: Tōhoku
- Prefecture: Aomori Prefecture
- District: Minamitsugaru
- Merged: March 28, 2005 (now part of Fujisaki)

Area
  - Total: 15.19 km^{2} (5.86 sq mi)

Population (March 1, 2005)
  - Total: 6,626
  - Density: 436.21/km^{2} (1,129.8/sq mi)
- Time zone: UTC+09:00 (JST)

Tokiwa (常盤村, Tokiwa-mura) was a village located in Minamitsugaru District in central Aomori Prefecture, Japan.

== History ==
Tokiwa Village was founded on April 1, 1889. It was elevated to town status on April 1, 1937. It merged with neighboring Tonogidate Village on May 3, 1954 and annexed a portion of Inakadate Village on June 10, 1956.

On March 28, 2005, Tokiwa was merged into the neighboring and expanding town of Fujisaki, and thus no longer exists as an independent municipality.

== Population ==
At the time of its merger, Tokiwa had an estimated population of 6,626 and a density of 436.21 persons per km^{2}. The total area was 15.19 km^{2}.

== Access ==
Tokiwa was served by Japan National Route 7 highway, and Kita-Tokiwa Station on the Ōu Main Line.
