= Namioka Dam =

Dam in Aomori Prefecture, Japan

- Location within Japan
- Location: Aomori Prefecture, Japan
- Coordinates: 40°43′10″N 140°40′30″E
- Construction began: 1973
- Opening date: 1982

Dam and spillways
- Height: 52.4 m (172 ft)
- Length: 304.5 m (999 ft)

Reservoir
- Total capacity: 7600 thousand cubic meters
- Catchment area: 15.3 sq. km
- Surface area: 55 hectares

Namioka Dam is a rockfill dam located in Aomori Prefecture in Japan. The dam is used for irrigation. The catchment area of the dam is 15.3 km^{2}. The dam impounds about 55 ha of land when full and can store 7600 thousand cubic meters of water. The construction of the dam started in 1973 and was completed in 1982.
