= Wada Dam =

Dam in Aomori Prefecture, Japan

- Location within Japan
- Location: Aomori Prefecture, Japan
- Coordinates: 40°41′21″N 141°5′13″E
- Construction began: 1971
- Opening date: 1996

Dam and spillways
- Type of dam: Embankment
- Impounds: Takase River
- Height: 44 m (144 ft)
- Length: 303 m (994 ft)

Reservoir
- Total capacity: 3,055,000 m^{3} (107,900,000 cu ft)
- Catchment area: 21.8 km^{2} (8.4 sq mi)
- Surface area: 33 ha (82 acres)

Wada Dam is a rockfill dam located in Aomori Prefecture in Japan. The dam is used for flood control and has a catchment area of 21.8 square kilometres (8.4 sq mi). It impounds about 33 hectares (82 acres) of land when full and can store 3,055,000 m^{3} of water. The construction of the dam was started on 1971 and completed in 1996.
