= Onoe, Aomori =

Onoe 尾上町
- Former municipality
- Flag Seal

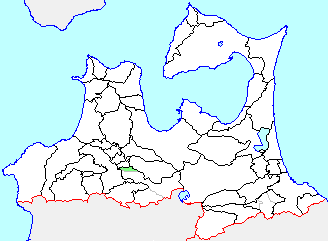
- Location of Onoe in Aomori Prefecture

- Location in Japan
- Coordinates: 40°36′53.8″N 140°34′21.3″E
- Country: Japan
- Region: Tōhoku
- Prefecture: Aomori Prefecture
- District: Minamitsugaru
- Merged: January 1, 2006 (now part of Hirakawa)

Area
  - Total: 18.87 km^{2} (7.29 sq mi)

Population (January 1, 2006)
  - Total: 10,102
  - Density: 535.35/km^{2} (1,386.6/sq mi)
- Time zone: UTC+09:00 (JST)
- Symbols
- Bird: Oriental turtle-dove
- Flower: Lotus
- Tree: Japanese black pine

Onoe (尾上町, Onoe-machi) was a town located in Minamitsugaru District in central Aomori Prefecture, Japan.

== History ==
Onoe Village was founded on April 1, 1889. It was elevated to town status on April 1, 1937. It merged with neighboring Saruga Village on January 1, 1955, and annexed a portion of Inakadate Village on June 10, 1956.

== Merge ==
On January 1, 2006, Onoe, along with the town of Hiraka, and the village of Ikarigaseki (all from Minamitsugaru District), was merged to create the new city of Hirakawa, and thus no longer exists as an independent municipality.

== Population ==
At the time of its merger, Onoe had an estimated population of 10,102 and a population density of 535.35 persons per km^{2}. The total area was 18.87 km^{2}.

== Transportation ==
Ikarigaseki was served by Japan National Route 102 highway, and by two stations on the Kōnan Railway Kōnan Line.
