= Saruka Shrine =

Shinto shrine in Aomori Prefecture, Japan

Saruka Jinja 猿賀神社
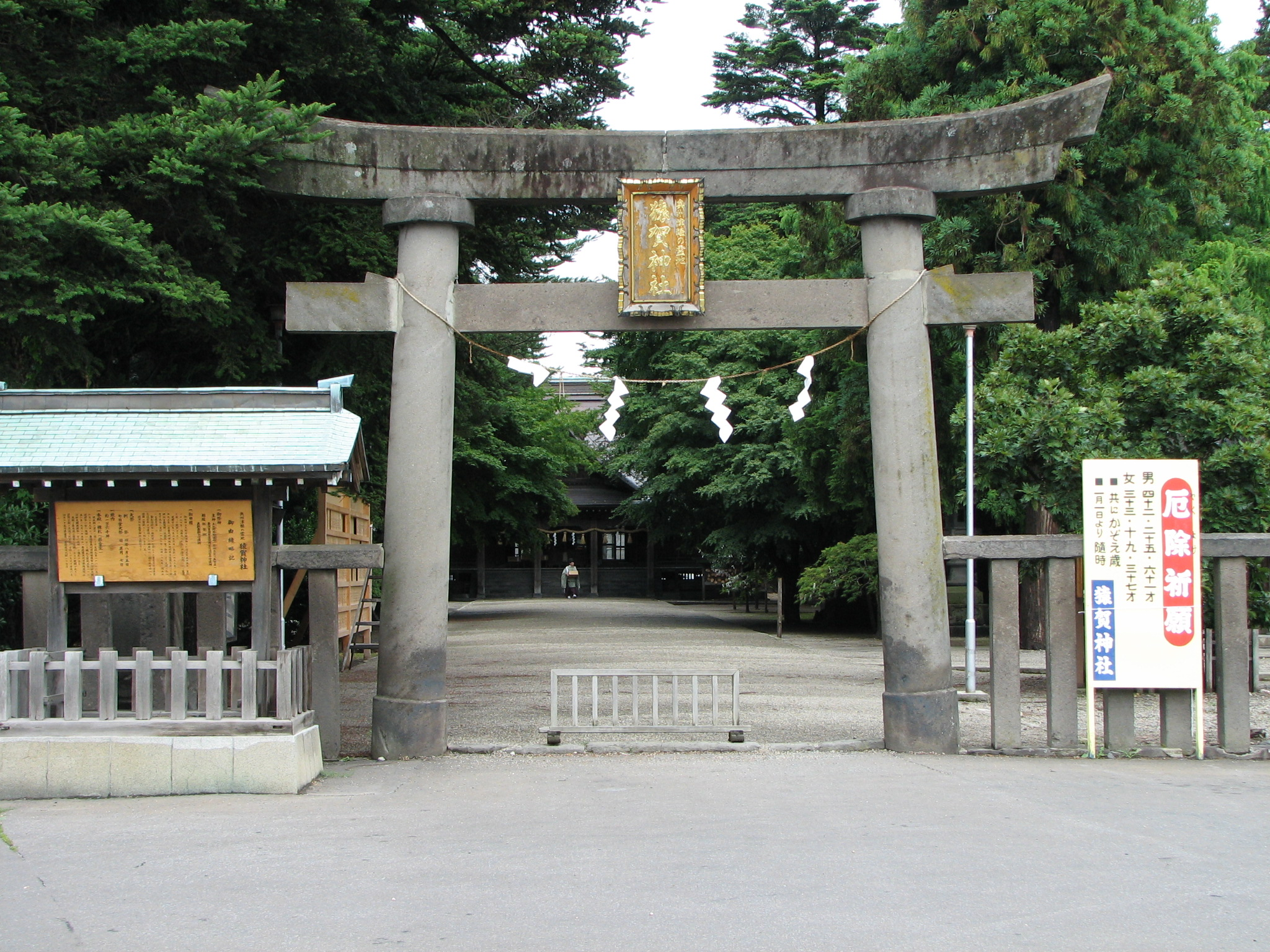
- Torii on the approach to Saruka Jinja

- Location within Aomori Prefecture Location within Japan

Religion
- Affiliation: Shinto

Location
- Location: Hirakawa, Aomori Prefecture
- Interactive map of Saruka Jinja 猿賀神社
- Coordinates: 40°37′01″N 140°33′47″E

Architecture
- Established: 807

Saruka Jinja (猿賀神社), sometimes rendered Saruga, is a Shinto shrine in Hirakawa, Aomori Prefecture, Japan. The shrine is said to have been founded in 807, when Sakanoue no Tamuramaro came north during the campaigns against the Ezo. The Honden, dating to 1826, is a Prefecturally-designated Important Cultural Property. Preserved building records (棟札) are a City-designated Important Cultural Property (Historic Materials). There is an annual rice-planting festival and a pond of pink lotus. The main kami enshrined here is Kamitsukenokimitaji no mikoto (上毛野君田道命).

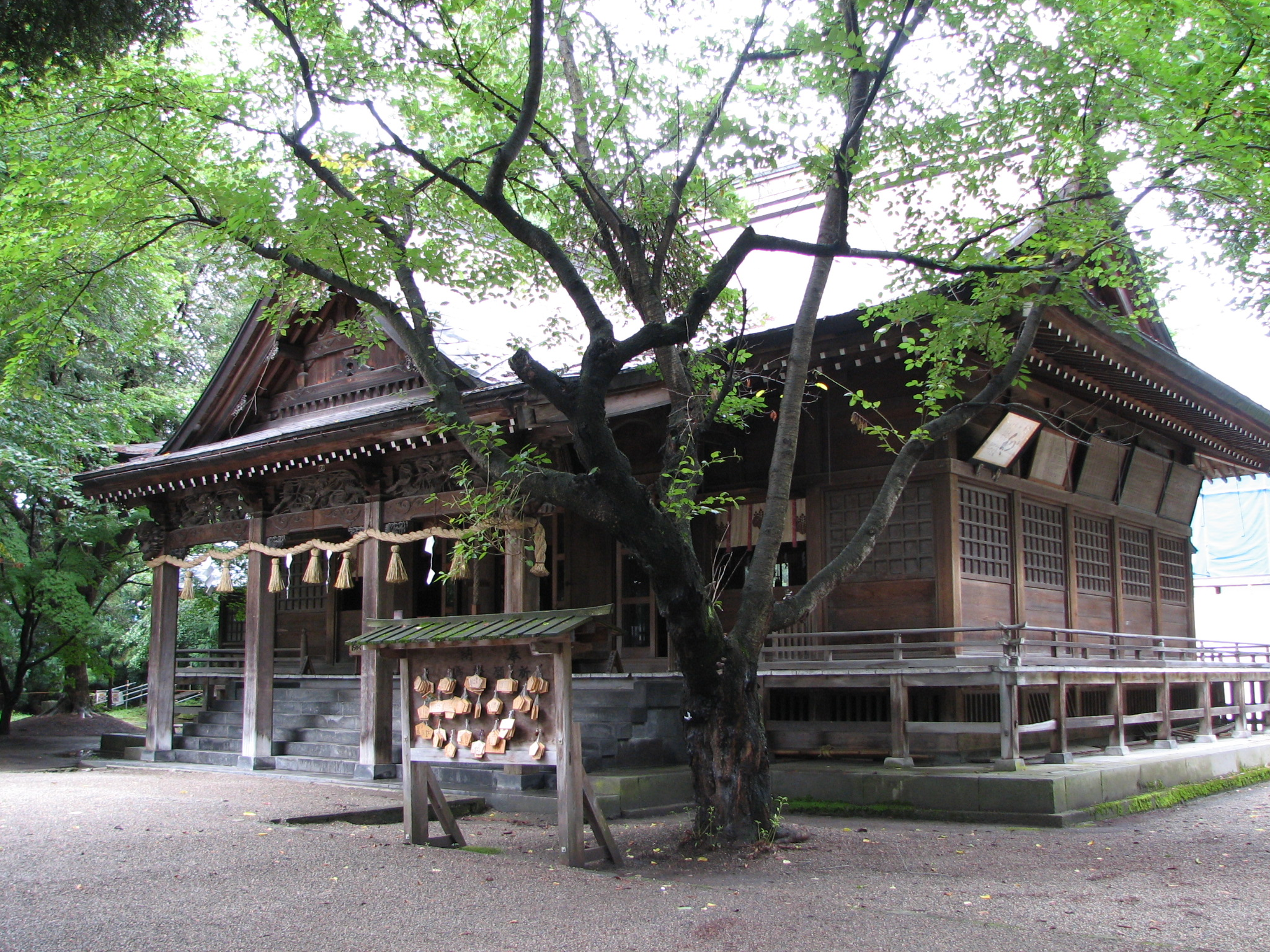
The haiden of Saruka Shrine

== See also ==
- Seito shoin teien
- Seibi-en
