= Hakodate Museum of Art, Hokkaido =

- 北海道立函館美術館
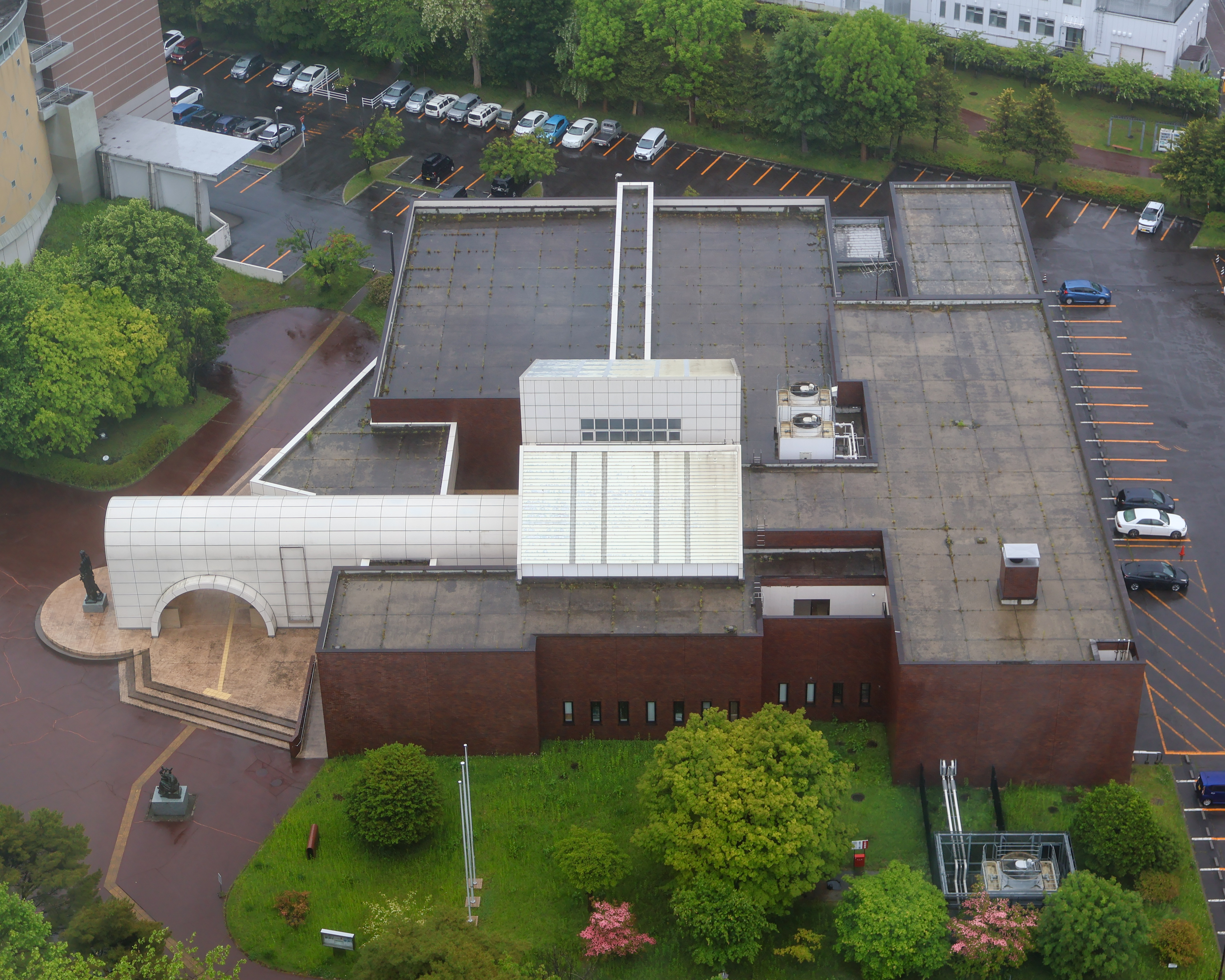
- Hakodate Museum of Art as viewed from Goryōkaku Tower in 2026
- Interactive map of the Hakodate Museum of Art, Hokkaido area

General information
- Location: 37-6 Goryōkaku-chō, Hakodate, Hokkaidō, Japan
- Coordinates: 41°47′36″N 140°45′17″E
- Opened: September 1986

Website
- Official website

Hakodate Museum of Art, Hokkaido (北海道立函館美術館, Hokkaidō-ritsu Hakodate Bikutsukan) opened in Hakodate, Hokkaidō, Japan in 1986. The collection focuses on works from southern Hokkaidō, including paintings by Kakizaki Hakyō and calligraphy by Kaneko Ōtei (金子鴎亭), and special exhibitions are also mounted.

== See also ==
- Hakodate City Museum
- Hakodate City Museum of Literature
- Hakodate City Museum of Northern Peoples
- Hakodate Jōmon Culture Center
- Goryōkaku
