= Takayama Uichi Memorial Museum of Art =

Museum in Japan

- 七戸町立鷹山宇一記念美術館
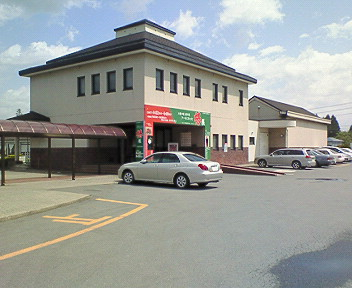
- The Takayama Uichi Memorial Museum of Art in 2007

General information
- Location: 67-94 Arakumanai, Shichinohe, Aomori Prefecture, Japan
- Coordinates: 40°43′01″N 141°09′21″E
- Opened: 1 August 1994

Website
- www.takayamamuseum.jp

Takayama Uichi Memorial Museum of Art (七戸町立鷹山宇一記念美術館, Shichinohe chōritsu Takayama Uichi kinen bijutsukan) opened in Shichinohe, Aomori Prefecture, Japan, in 1994 as a part of Roadside Station Shichinohe. The collection comprises four main areas: three rooms with paintings by four artists from or otherwise associated with Shichinohe, namely Takayama Uichi (鷹山宇一) (1908–1999) and fellow yōga artist Hirano Shirō (平野四郎) (1904–1983), Nihonga artist Toya Banzan (鳥谷幡山) (1876–1966), and Kamiizumi Kayō (上泉華陽) (1892–1979), who specialised in painting horses; the Lamp Hall, with its nucleus in Takayama Uichi's collection of nineteenth-century western and Meiji lamps; the Ema Hall, with folk artefacts centred upon ema, hagoita, and other related items from nearby Mirumachi Kannon-dō (見町観音堂) and Kodako Fudō-dō (小田子不動堂) that have been designated Important Tangible Folk Cultural Properties; and a Spanish Folk Ceramic Hall.

== See also ==
- Aomori Museum of Art
- List of Cultural Properties of Japan - paintings (Aomori)
- List of Important Tangible Folk Cultural Properties
- Mingei
