= List of places of scenic beauty of Japan (Aomori) =

This list is of the places of scenic beauty of Japan located within the Prefecture of Aomori.

== National Places of Scenic Beauty ==
As of 26 December 2025, eleven Places have been designated at a national level (including one *Special Place of Scenic Beauty); Lake Towada-Oirase River spans the prefectural borders with Akita.

| Site | Municipality | Comments | Image | Coordinates | Type | Ref. |
|---|---|---|---|---|---|---|
| *Lake Towada-Oirase River 十和田湖および奥入瀬渓流; Towada-ko oyobi Oirase-keiryū | Towada | also a Natural Monument; designation includes an area of Kosaka in Akita Prefecture | | 40°28′17″N 140°52′33″E | 6 | |
| Kanehiranari-en 金平成園（澤成園） Kanehiranari-en (Sawanari-en) | Kuroishi | | | 40°38′36″N 140°35′33″E | 1 | |
| Zuiraku-en 瑞楽園; Zuiraku-en | Hirosaki | | | 40°38′58″N 140°24′51″E | 1 | |
| Sutō Family Gardens (Seishō-en) 須藤氏庭園（青松園） Sutō-shi teien (Seishō-en) | Hirosaki | | | 40°39′24″N 140°26′17″E | 1 | |
| Seitō Family Shoin Gardens 清藤氏書院庭園; Seitō-shi shoin teien | Hirakawa | | | 40°36′57″N 140°34′11″E | 1 | |
| Seibi-en 盛美園; Seibi-en | Hirakawa | | | 40°37′02″N 140°34′11″E | 1 | |
| Tanesashi Coast 種差海岸; Tanesashi-kaigan | Hachinohe | | | 40°31′01″N 141°35′28″E | 4, 8 | |
| Tsushima Family Gardens 對馬氏庭園; Tsushima-shi teien | Hirosaki | | | 40°38′41″N 140°24′41″E | 1 | |
| Narita Family Gardens 成田氏庭園; Narita-shi teien | Hirosaki | | | 40°35′36″N 140°27′26″E | 1 | |
| Hotoke-ga-ura 仏宇多（仏ヶ浦） Hotoke-uta (Hotoke-ga-ura) | Sai | also a Natural Monument | | 41°18′24″N 140°48′13″E | 4, 8 | |
| Seisen-en 静川園; Seisen-en | Nakadomari | | | 40°58′51″N 140°25′38″E | 1 | |

== Prefectural Places of Scenic Beauty ==
As of 1 May 2025, one Place has been designated at a prefectural level.

| Site | Municipality | Comments | Image | Coordinates | Type | Ref. |
|---|---|---|---|---|---|---|
| Teishō-ji Gardens 貞昌寺庭園; Teishōji teien | Hirosaki | | | 40°35′40″N 140°27′42″E | | |

== Municipal Places of Scenic Beauty ==
As of 1 May 2025, thirteen Places have been designated at a municipal level.

== Registered Places of Scenic Beauty ==
As of 1 December 2025, four Monuments have been registered (as opposed to designated) as Places of Scenic Beauty at a national level.

| Place | Municipality | Comments | Image | Coordinates | Type | Ref. |
|---|---|---|---|---|---|---|
| Former Kikuchi Family Gardens 旧菊池氏庭園（弘前明の星幼稚園庭園） kyū-Kikuchi-shi teien (Hirosaki Ake-no-hoshi yōchi-en teien) | Hirosaki | | | 40°36′53″N 140°27′48″E | | |
| Tandō Family Gardens (Former Mikami Family Gardens) 丹藤氏庭園（旧三上氏庭園） Tandō-shi teien (kyū-Mikami-shi teien) | Hirosaki | | | 40°37′22″N 140°23′27″E | | |
| Narumi Family Gardens 鳴海氏庭園; Narumi-shi teien | Kuroishi | | | 40°38′40″N 140°35′48″E | | |
| Yōki-en 揚亀園; Yōki-en | Hirosaki | | | 40°36′41″N 140°28′10″E | | |

== See also ==
- Cultural Properties of Japan
- List of Historic Sites of Japan (Aomori)
- List of parks and gardens of Aomori Prefecture
- List of Cultural Properties of Japan – paintings (Aomori)
