= Seibi =

Seibi may refer to:

- Seibi University (成美大学), university in Fukuchiyama, Kyoto, Japan
- Seibi-en (盛美園), landscape garden in Hirakawa, Aomori Prefecture, Japan
