= List of important tangible folk cultural properties =

As of January 24, 2026, there were 229 designated important tangible folk cultural properties of Japan.

== Selection criteria ==
Important tangible folk cultural properties are designated based on the following designation criteria:

Categories

1. Necessities of life: clothes, accessories, eating and drinking tools, household furnishings and other residential items
2. Manufacture, livelihood: farming implements, fishing and hunting gear, artisan tools, spinning and weaving equipment, other items related to work
3. Traffic, transportation, communication: means of transport, boats, express messenger implements and other items related to barriers
4. Trade, commerce: calculation and measurement tools, signs, licenses, and other shop related items
5. Social life: gift exchange, implements for guards and judgements, boarding houses
6. Religious faith: ritual implements, implements for Buddhist mass, votive offerings, idols, magic implements, and other items associated with shrines
7. Knowledge of folk customs: calendars, implements for fortune telling, medical tools, and other items related to institutional education
8. Folk entertainment, amusement, games: costumes, implements, musical instruments, masks, dolls, toys, and other items related to the stage
9. Related to the life of people: upbringing, important celebrations in family relationships, maternity rooms
10. Annual functions or events: implements for the Japanese New Year, seasonal festivals or the Bon Festival

Criteria

Materials from any of the above categories are then judged based on whether they exemplify:

1. historical change
2. a characteristic typical for the period
3. a regional characteristic
4. a characteristic of the level of life
5. a functional aspect

== Statistics ==
Statistics for important tangible folk cultural properties
Category	National treasures
Necessities of life	29
Manufacture, livelihood	102
Traffic, transportation, communication	19
Trade, commerce	1
Social life	1
Religious faith	41
Knowledge of folk customs	7
Folk entertainment, amusement, games	23
Related to the life of people	3
Annual functions or events	3

== Designated cultural properties ==
=== Necessities of life ===
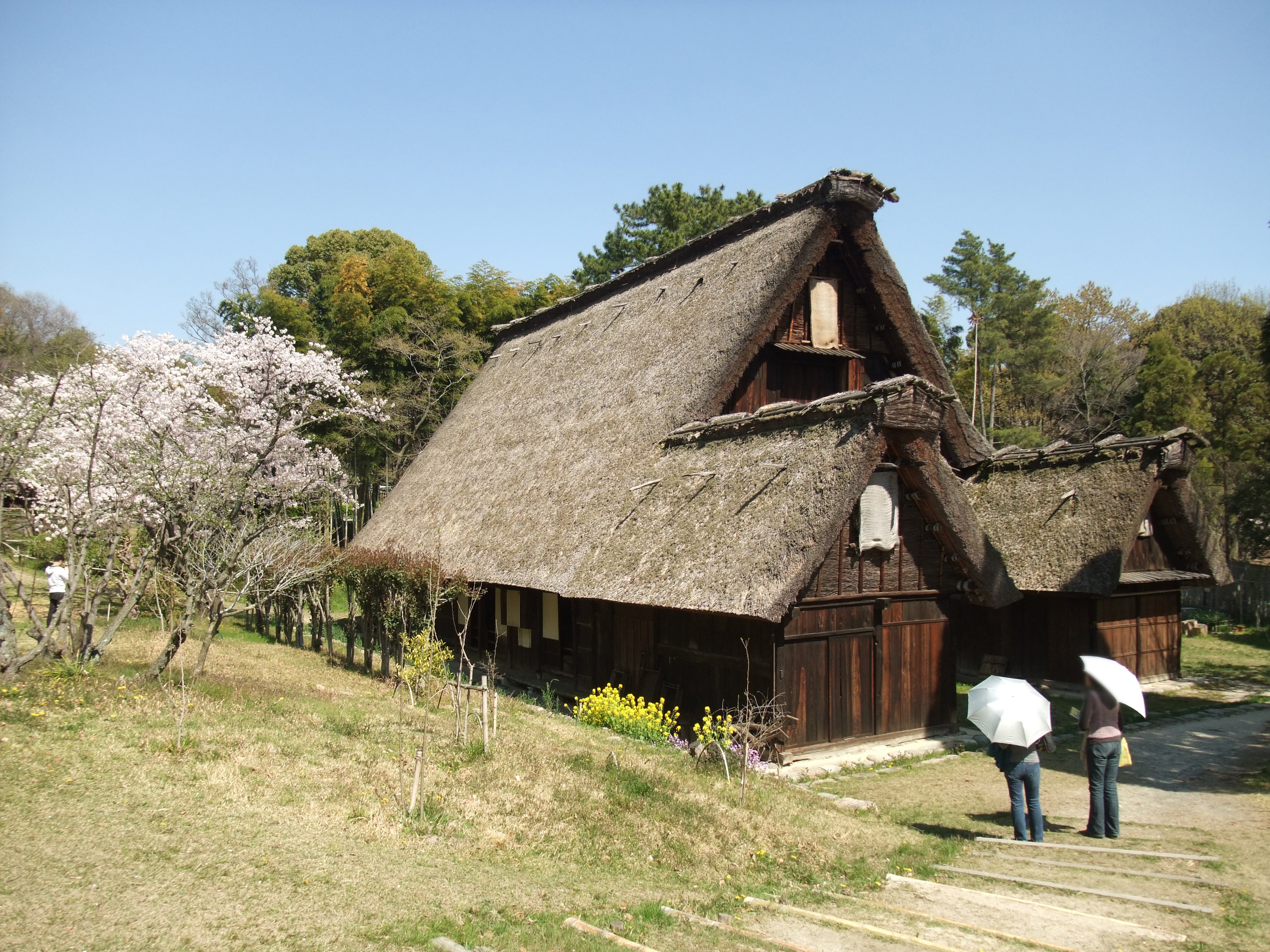
Gasshō-zukuri minka house from Shirakawa

Necessities of life
Name	Criteria	Location
Collection of implements of daily life of the Ainu people (アイヌの生活用具コレクション, ainu no seikatsu yōgu korekushon)	1.1, 1.2, 2.3	Hakodate City Museum of Northern Peoples, Hakodate, Hokkaidō
Implements of daily life of the Ainu people from Nibutani, Hokkaidō, and surroundings (北海道二風谷及び周辺地域のアイヌ生活用具コレクション, hokkaidō nibutani oyobi shūhen chiiki no ainu seikatsu yōgu korekushon)	1.1, 1.2, 2.3	Nibutani Ainu Culture Museum and Kayano Shigeru Nibutani Ainu Archive (萱野茂二風谷アイヌ資料館, kayano shigeru nibutani ainu shiryōkan), Biratori, Hokkaidō
Southern Tsugaru quilted clothes (津軽・南部のさしこ着物, tsugaru nanbu no sashiko kimono)	1.1, 2.3	Aomori Prefectural Museum, Aomori, Aomori
Collection of southern quilted work clothes (南部のさしこ仕事着コレクション, nanbu no sashiko shigotogi korekushon)	1.1, 1.2, 2.3	Misawa Memorial Hall for Forerunners (三沢市先人記念館, misawashi senjin kinenkai), Misawa, Aomori
Items for use during snowy periods from Sawauchi and surroundings (沢内及び周辺地域の積雪期用具, sawauchi oyobi shūhen chiiki no sekisetsuki yōgu)	1.1, 1.2, 2.3	Hekishōji Temple Museum (碧祥寺博物館, hekishōji hakubutsukan), Nishiwaga, Iwate
Collection of masks for work (作業用覆面コレクション, sagyōyō fukumen korekushon)	1.1, 1.2, 2.3	North Asia University Snow Country Folklore Museum (ノースアジア大学附属雪国民俗館), Akita, Akita
Collection of Kurimono and related tools from Shōnai and surrounding areas (庄内および周辺地のくりものコレクション 附 工具, shōnai oyobi shūhenchi no kurimono korekushon tsuketari kōgu)	1.1, 2.3, 2.5	Chidō Museum, Tsuruoka, Yamagata
Shōnai collection of work clothes (庄内の仕事着コレクション, shōnai no shigotogi korekushon)	1.1, 1.2, 2.3	Chidō Museum, Tsuruoka, Yamagata
Shōnai collection of wooden drinking vessels (庄内の木製酒器コレクション, shōnai no mokusei shuki korekushon)	1.1, 2.3	Chidō Museum, Tsuruoka, Yamagata
Collection of Daihō-ji pottery (大宝寺焼コレクション, daihō-ji-yaki korekushon)	1.1, 2.3	Chidō Museum, Tsuruoka, Yamagata
Implements of life and private house from upper Fujiwara (old Kumogoshi residence) (上州藤原（旧雲越家）の生活用具及び民家, jōshū fujiwara (kyū-kumogoshi-ke) no seikatsu yōgu oyobi minka)	1.1, 1.2	Kumogoshi Historical Residence (雲越家住宅資料館), Fujiwara, Minakami, Gunma
Implements of life from the Hamura private house (old Shimoda residence) (羽村の民家（旧下田家）とその生活用具, hamura no minka (kyūshimodake) to sono seikatsu yōgu)	1.1, 1.2, 2.3	Hamura City Folk Art Museum (羽村市郷土博物館), Daishoji Shikiji, Hamura, Tokyo
Collection of mountain hakama (yamabakama) (hinagata miniature clothes, momohiki pantaloons, underpants, outer garments and improved work clothes) (山袴コレクション 附 引解 雛形 モモヒキ 下穿 上衣 改良仕事服, yama-bakama korekushon tsuketari himotoki hinagata momohiki shitabaki uwagi kairyō-shigoto-gi)	1.1, 2.1, 2.3	Miyamoto Memorial Foundation (宮本記念財団), Tokyo
Kiyose uchiori (清瀬のうちおり, kiyose no uchiori)	1.1, 2.2, 2.3	Kiyose City Folk Museum, Kiyose, Tokyo
Items for use during snowy periods from Tōkamachi (十日町の積雪期用具, tōkamachi no sekisetsuki yōgu)	1.1, 1.2, 2.3	Tōkamachi City Museum, Tōkamachi, Niigata
Items for use during snowy periods from the Tōhoku region (東北日本の積雪期用具 附 改良形用具, tōhoku nihon no sekisetsuki yōgu tsuketari kairyōgata yōgu)	1.1, 1.2, 2.3	Nagaoka Municipal Science Museum (長岡市立科学博物館) (229 items) and Nagaoka City Museum of Local History (長岡市郷土史料館) (14 items), Nagaoka, Niigata
Items for use during snowy periods from the foot of Mount Haku (白山麓の積雪期用具, hakusanroku no sekisetsuki yōgu)	1.1, 1.2, 2.3	(有形民俗文化財収蔵庫), Daishoji Shikiji, Kaga, Ishikawa
Implements of life from Shiramine (白峰の出作り生活の用具, shiramine no dezukuri seikatsu yōgu)	1.1, 1.2, 2.3	Hakusan Folk Museum (石川県立白山ろく民俗資料館), Hakusan, Ishikawa
Shiramine minka ("mountain hut") and implements of life (白峰の出作り民家（山の小屋）と生活用具, shiramine no dezukuri minka (yama no koya) to seikatsu yōgu)	1.1, 1.2, 2.3	Hakusan Folk Museum (石川県立白山ろく民俗資料館), Hakusan, Ishikawa
Lamps used around Shinano and woodblock prints (信濃及び周辺地域の灯火用具 附 版画等関係資料, shinano oyobi shūhen chiiki no tōka yōgu tsuketari hanga tō kankei shiryō)	1.1, 2.1, 2.3	Japanese Lamp Museum (日本のあかり博物館), Obuse, Nagano
Collection of Someya ware pottery (染屋焼コレクション, someyayaki korekushon)	1.1, 2.2, 2.3	UEDA City Museum (上田市立博物館), Ueda, Nagano
Items for use during snowy periods from Miyagawa and surroundings (宮川及び周辺地域の積雪期用具, miyagawa oyobi shūhen chiiki no sekisetsuki yōgu)	1.1, 1.2, 2.3	Hida Miyagawa Anthropology Museum (飛騨みやがわ考古民俗館), Miyagawa, Hida, Gifu
Articles for daily life and manufacture from the Yamaki site (山木遺跡の生産・生活用具, yamaki iseki no seisan seikatsu yōgu)	1.1. ,1.2, 2.2	Nirayama Historical Museum (韮山郷土史料館), Izunokuni, Shizuoka
Collection of hyōsoku oil lamps (秉燭コレクション, hyōsoku korekushon)	1.1	Gamagori City Museum (蒲郡市博物館), Gamagōri, Aichi
Collection of Tanba ware pottery (丹波焼コレクション, tanbayaki korekushon)	1.1, 2.1, 2.3	Kyoto
Minka (Gasshō-zukuri house from Shirakawa) (民家（白川の合掌造, minka (shirakawa no gasshō-zukuri)	1.1	Open-Air Museum Of Old Japanese Farm Houses (日本民家集落博物館), Hattori Ryokuchi Park, Toyonaka, Osaka
Items for use during snowy periods from Okuiishi and environment (奥飯石および周辺地域の積雪期用具, okuiishi oyobi shūhen chiiki no sekisetsuki yōgu)	1.1, 2.3	Iinan Folk Museum (飯南町民俗資料館), Iinan, Shimane
Footwear collection (はきものコレクション, hakimono korekushon)	1.1, 2.1, 2.3	Japan Footwear Museum (日本はきもの博物館), Matsunaga-chō, Fukuyama, Hiroshima
Implements of life from Tarutoko and Yawata mountain villages and a private house (樽床・八幡山村生活用具および民家, tarutoko, yawatasan son seikatsu yōgu oyobi minka)	1.1, 1.2, 2.3	Geihoku Folklore Museum (芸北民俗博物館), Nishiyawatahara, Kitahiroshima, Hiroshima

=== Traffic, transportation, communication ===
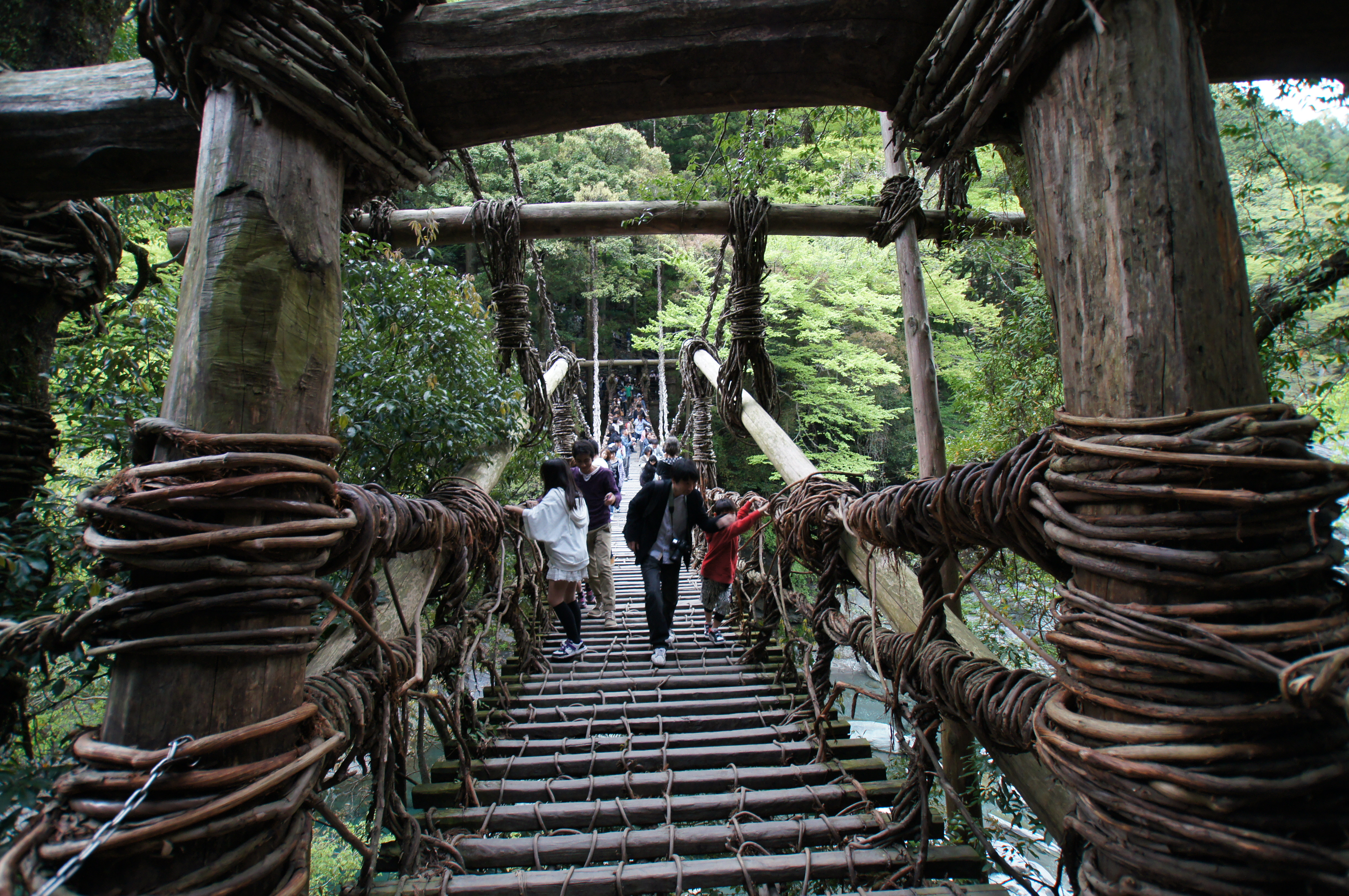
Iya Valley vine bridge

Traffic, transportation, communication
Name	Criteria	Location
Ainu dugout canoe (Kashōyō) (アイヌのまるきぶね(河沼用), ainu no marukibune (kashōyō))	1.3, 1.2	Hokkaido University Natural History Museum (北方民族資料室) (Botanical Gardens), Sapporo, Hokkaidō
Collection of mudamahagi type fishing boats from Tsugaru Strait and surrounding areas (津軽海峡及び周辺地域のムダマハギ型漁船コレクション, tsugaru kaikyō oyobi shūhen chiiki no mudamahagi-gata gyosen korekushon)	1.3, 2.3	Michinoku Traditional Wooden Boat Museum, Aomori, Aomori
Dugout boat from Tomari (泊のまるきぶね, tomari no marukibune)	1.3, 1.2	Aomori Prefectural Museum, Aomori, Aomori
Dugout boat from Ōfunato (大船渡のまるた, ōfunato no maruta)	1.3, 1.2	Ōfunato City Museum (大船渡市立博物館), Ōfunato, Iwate
Dugout boat from Sawauchi (沢内のまるきぶね, sawauchi no marukibune)	1.3	Hekishōji Temple Museum (碧祥寺博物館, hekishōji hakubutsukan), Nishiwaga, Iwate
Box-shaped dugout boat from Ōnuma (Kittsu) (大沼の箱形くりぶね (きっつ), ōnuma no hakogata kuribune (kittsu))	1.3, 1.2	North Asia University Snow Country Folklore Museum (ノースアジア大学附属雪国民俗館), Akita, Akita
Dugout canoe of Oga (男鹿のまるきぶね, oga no marukibune)	1.3, 1.2	Oga Civic Cultural Hall (男鹿市市民文化会館, Oga-shi shimin bunka kaikan), Oga, Akita
Dugout canoe of Lake Tazawa (田沢湖のまるきぶね, tazawako no marukibune)	1.3, 1.2	Lake Tazawa Local History Museum (田沢湖郷土史料館), Semboku, Akita
Collection of Bandori from Shōnai (庄内のばんどりコレクション, shōnai no bandori korekushon)	1.3, 2.3	Chidō Museum, Tsuruoka, Yamagata
Dobune (Hanakiri) with scull, oars and water scoop (どぶね(はなきり) 附 櫓 櫂 あかとり, dobune (hanakiri) tsuketari ro kai akatori)	1.3, 1.2	Jōetsu Aquarium, Jōetsu, Niigata
Collection of transport implements used by porters along the Himekawa river valley of Echigo Province (越後姫川谷のボッカ運搬用具コレクション, echigo himekawadani no bokka unpan yōgu korekushon)	1.3, 1.4, 2.3	Salt Road Museum, Itoigawa, Niigata
Dobune of Noto Uchiura (能登内浦のドブネ, noto uchiura no dobune)	1.2, 2.3	Noto, Ishikawa
Collection of Hida sledges (飛騨のそりコレクション, hida no sori korekushon)	1.3, 2.3	Hida Minzoku Mura Folk Village, Takayama, Gifu
Collection of back carrying equipment (背負運搬具コレクション, seoi unpangu korekushon)	1.3, 2.3	National Museum of Ethnology, Suita, Osaka
Soriko (そりこ)	3, 2	Miho Jinja, Matsue, Shimane
Tomodo (トモド)	3, 2	Nishinoshima Furusatokan (西ノ島ふるさと館), Nishinoshima, Shimane
Esaki dugout canoe (江崎のまるきぶね, Esaki no marukibune)	3	Ochayamachi, Hōfu, Yamaguchi
Iya vine bridge (祖谷の蔓橋, Iya no kazurabashi)	3	Zentoku, Nishiiyayamamura, Miyoshi, Tokushima
Collection of carrying implements from Western Japan (西日本の背負運搬具コレクション, nishi nihon seoi unpongu korekushon)	1.3, 2.1, 2.3	Seto Inland Sea Folk History Museum (瀬戸内海歴史民俗資料館), Takamatsu, Kagawa

=== Trade, commerce ===
Trade, commerce
Name	Criteria	Location
Articles of the medicine pebblers of Toyama (富山の売薬用具, toyama no baiyaku yōgu)	2, 4, 3	Museum of Medicine Peddlers, Toyama Municipal Folkcraft Village, Toyama, Toyama

=== Social life ===
Social life
Name	Criteria	Location
Hamada no tomariya (浜田の泊屋)	1,5	Yamana-chō Yoshina, Sukumo, Kōchi

=== Religious faith ===
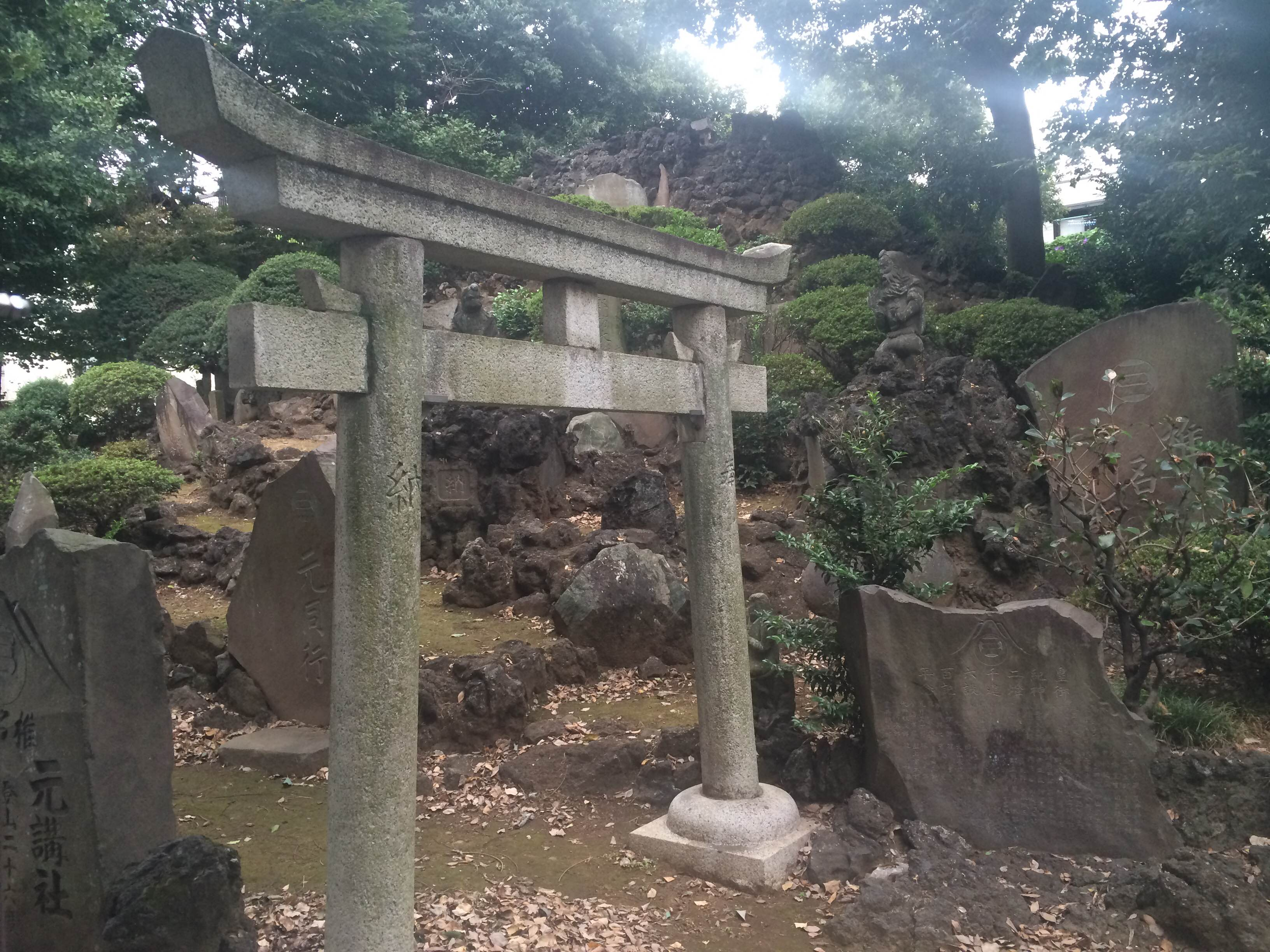
Fujizuka of Toshima-Nagasaki

Religious faith
Name	Criteria	Location
Marine Faith Materials Dedicated to Engaku-ji (円覚寺奉納海上信仰資料, engakuji hōnō kaijō shinkō shiryō)	1.6	Engaku-ji, Fukaura, Aomori
Items related to the folk beliefs of Nanbu Shichinohe Mirumachi Kannon Hall (南部七戸見町観音堂庶民信仰資料, nanbu shichinohe mirumachi kannon-dō shomin shinkō shiryō)	1.6, 2.2, 2.3	Takayama Uichi Memorial Museum of Art, Shichinohe, Aomori
Ema dedicated to Nanbu Shichinohe Kodakko Fudō Hall (南部七戸小田子不動堂奉納絵馬, nanbu shichinohe kodakko fudō-dō hōnō ema)	1.6, 2.2, 2.3	Takayama Uichi Memorial Museum of Art, Shichinohe, Aomori
Kuroishi 13 mounds (黒石の十三塚, kuroishi no jūsan-zuka)	1.6	Kuroishi-chō, Mizusawaku, Ōshū, Iwate
Ema votive plaques related to the sericulture, offered to Bishamon-dō, Fukuō-ji (福應寺毘沙門堂奉納養蚕信仰絵馬, fukuō-ji bishamon-dō hōnō yōsan shinkō ema)	1.6, 2.3	Tōhoku History Museum, Tagajō, Miyagi
Items related to the folk beliefs around the Iwaya Jyuhachiya Kannon (岩谷十八夜観音庶民信仰資料, iwaya jūhachi-ya kannon shomin shinkō shiryō)	1.6, 1.7, 2.3	Nakayama-machi Municipal Folk History Museum (中山町立歴史民俗資料館), Nakayama, Yamagata
Folk implements of mountain worship in the Okitama region and gyōya huts (置賜の登拝習俗用具及び行屋, okitama no tohai jūzoku yōgu oyobi gyōya)	1.6, 2.3	Farming Village Cultural Research Institute Museum (農村文化研究所置賜民俗資料館) and Yonezawa City Uesugi Museum, Yonezawa, Yamagata
Miniature pagodas and vessels for depositing ashes offered to Hachiyō-ji (八葉寺奉納小型納骨塔婆及び納骨器, hachiyōji hōnō kogata nōkotsu tōba oyobi nōkotsu-ki)	1.6	Hachiyō-ji (八葉寺), Aizuwakamatsu, Fukushima
Hitachi Float (日立風流物, hitachi furyū-mono)	1.6	Kamine Shrine (神峰神社), Hitachi, Ibaraki
Chichibu Festival Floats (秩父祭屋台, chichibu matsuri yatai)	1.6	Chichibu, Saitama
Fujizuka of Kizoru (木曽呂の富士塚, kizoru no fujizuka)	1.6	Kawaguchi, Saitama
Tagoyama Fujizuka of Shiki (志木の田子山富士塚, shiki no tagoyama fujizuka)	1.6	Shikishima Shrine (敷島神社), Shiki, Saitama
Fujizuka of Shitaya-sakamoto (下谷坂本の富士塚, shitaya sakamoto no fujizuka)	1.6	Shitaya, Taitō, Tokyo
Fujizuka of Ekoda (江古田の富士塚, ekoda no fujizuka)	1.6	Kotake-chō, Nerima, Tokyo
Fujizuka of Toshima-Nagasaki (豊島長崎の富士塚, toshima nagasaki no fujizuka)	1.6	Takamatsu, Toshima, Tokyo
Model ships offered to Kotohira Shrine (金刀比羅神社奉納模型和船, kotohira jinja hōnō mokei wasen)	1.6	Kotohira Shrine (金刀比羅神社), Niigata, Niigata
Model ships and boat ema offered to Arakawa Shrine (荒川神社奉納模型和船および船絵馬, arakawa jinja hōnō mokei wasen oyobi funa-ema)	1.6	Tainai city Cultural Properties Storage Room (胎内市文化財収蔵庫), Tainai, Niigata
Marine Faith Materials of Nō Hakusan Shrine (能生白山神社の海上信仰資料, nō hakusan jinja no kaijō shinkō shiryō)	1.6	Nō Hakusan Shrine (能生白山神社), Itoigawa, Niigata
Boat ema offered to Shirayama Hime Shrine (白山媛神社奉納船絵馬, shirayama hime jinja hōnō funa-ema)	1.6	Nagaoka, Niigata
Offerings of Echigo-jōfu streamers (奉納越後上布幟, hōnō echigo jōfu ori)	1.6, 2.2, 2.3	Hachimangū, Minamiuonuma, Niigata
Takaoka Mikurumayama (高岡御車山, takaoka mikurumayama)	1.6	Mikurumayama Museum (高岡御車山収蔵庫), Takaoka, Toyama
Tateyama religious articles (立山信仰用具, tateyama shinkō yōgu)	1.6, 2.3	Tateyama Museum of Toyama (富山県立山博物館), Tateyama, Toyama
Materials related to childbirth and child upbringing dedicated to Shinjō-ji (真成寺奉納産育信仰資料, shinjōji hōnō saniku shinkō shiryō)	1.6, 1.9, 2.3	Shinjō-ji (真成寺), Kanazawa, Ishikawa
Collection of items related to folk beliefs (民間信仰資料コレクション, minkan shinkō shiryō korekushon)	1.6, 2.3	Matsumoto City Museum (松本市立博物館), Matsumoto, Nagano
Takayama Festival floats (高山祭屋台, takayama matsuri yatai)	1.6	Takayama, Gifu
Gion Matsuri yamaboko-floats (祇園祭山鉾, gion matsuri yamaboko)	1.6	Kyoto, Kyoto
Prayer ema for raising children offered to Miyake Hachiman Shrine (三宅八幡神社奉納子育て祈願絵馬, miyake hachiman jinja hōnō kosodate kigan ema)	1.6, 2.3	Miyake Hachiman Ema Museum (絵馬展示資料館), Kyoto, Kyoto
Items related to the folk belief of Rokuharamitsu-ji (六波羅蜜寺の庶民信仰資料, rokuharamitsuji no shomin shinkō shiryō)	1.6	Rokuharamitsu-ji, Kyoto, Kyoto
Collection of oshirasama dolls (おしらさまコレクション, oshirasama korekushon)	1.6, 2.3	National Museum of Ethnology, Suita, Osaka
Kanaya 13 mounds (金屋の十三塚, kanaya no jūsan-zuka)	1.6	Kanaya, Sannan-chō, Tanba, Hyōgo
Mitsuyama models at Harima Sōsha (播磨総社「三ツ山」ひな型, harima sōsha mitsuyama hinagata)	1.6	Itatehyōzu Shrine, Himeji, Hyōgo
Items related to the folk belief of Gangō-ji (元興寺庶民信仰資料, gangōji shomin shinkō shiryō)	1.6	Gangō-ji, Nara, Nara
Ikoma Jūsan-tōge 13 mounds (生駒十三峠の十三塚, ikoma jūsan-tōge no jūsan-zuka)	1.6	Heguri, Ikoma District, Nara and Yao, Osaka
Morotabune (諸手船)	1.3, 1.6	Miho Shrine, Matsue, Shimane
Musical instruments dedicated to Miho Shrine (美保神社奉納鳴物, miho jinja hōnō narimono)	1.6	Miho Shrine, Matsue, Shimane
Toyomatsu religious articles (豊松の信仰用具, toyomatsu no shinkō yōgu)	1.6, 2.3	Jinsekikōgen, Hiroshima
Public Bathhouse at Amida-ji with iron water kettle and the remains of an iron vessel (阿弥陀寺の湯屋 附 旧鉄湯釜 旧鉄湯舟残欠, amidaji no yuya tsuketari kyū tetsuyugama kyū tetsuyubune zanketsu)	1.6	Amida-ji Hōfu, Yamaguchi
Yama-no-Kami forests on Futaoi-jima (蓋井島「山ノ神」の森, futaoijima yama no kami no mori)	1.6	four locations on Futaoi-jima, Shimonoseki, Yamaguchi
Boat ema dedicated to Susa Hōsen-ji Kōteisha (須佐宝泉寺・黄帝社奉納船絵馬, susa hōsenji kōteisha hōnō funaema)	1.6, 2.2	The Hagi Museum (博物館), Hagi, Yamaguchi
Items related to the folk beliefs of Konpira (金毘羅庶民信仰資料, konpira shomin shinkō shiryō)	1.6, 2.1	Kotohira, Kagawa
Religious articles of Nagasaki Kakure Kirishitan (長崎のかくれキリシタン信仰用具, nagasaki no kakure kirishitan shinkō yōgu)		Nagasaki Museum of History and Culture, Sotome Museum of History and Folklore and Father De Rotz Memorial Museum, Nagasaki; Hirado Kirishitan Museum and Hirado City Ikitsuki-jima no Yakata Museum, Hirado; Geihinkan Museum, Shin-Kamigotō; Goto Tourism and Historical Materials Museum, Nagasaki

=== Knowledge of folk customs ===
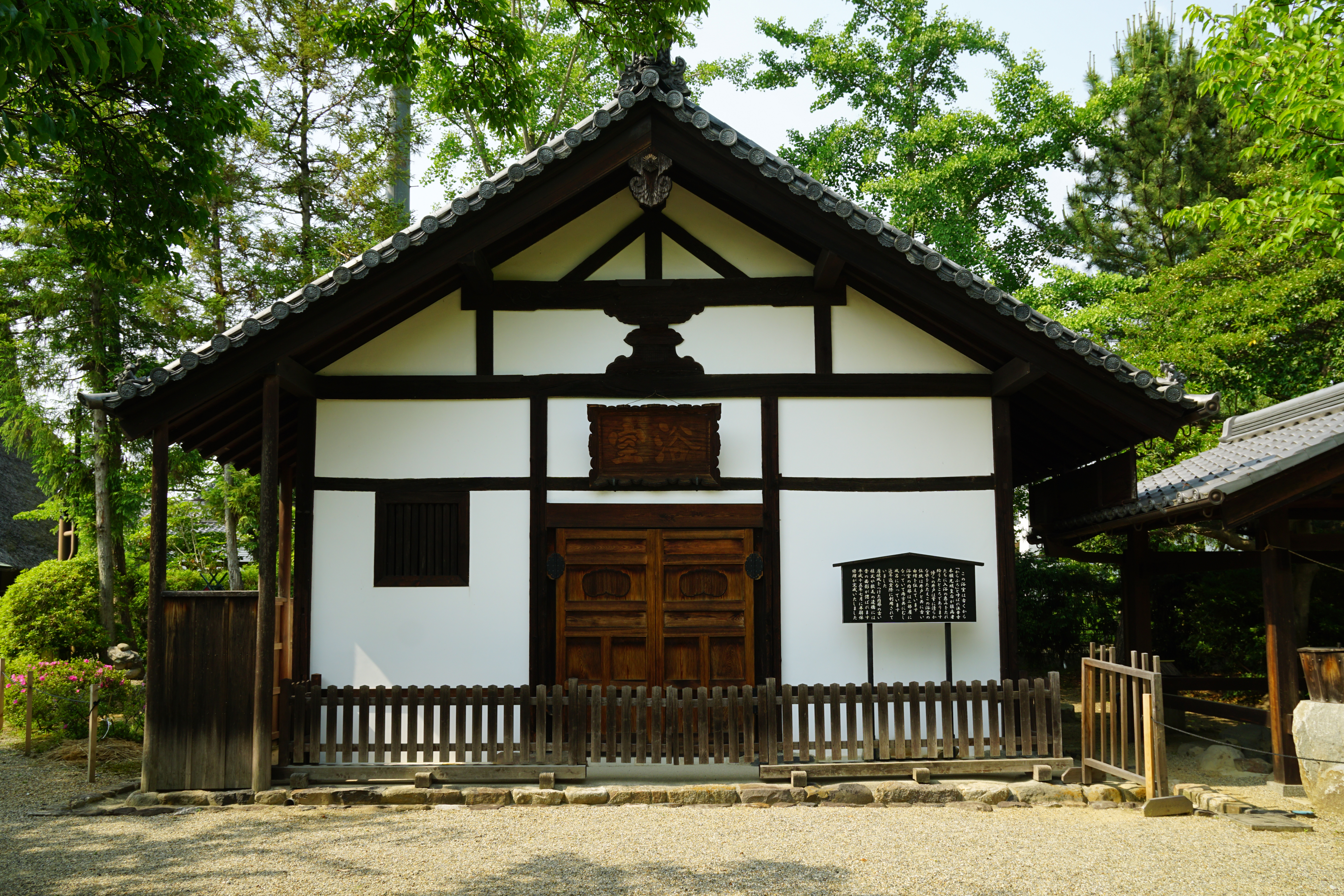
Hokke-ji Karaburo bath house

Knowledge of folk customs
Name	Criteria	Location
Watanabe Gakuen collection of miniature clothes and teaching tools (渡辺学園裁縫雛形コレクション 附 教具類他, Watanabe Gakuen saihō hinagata korekushon tsuketari kyōgu rui hoka)	7	Kasei University Museum, Tokyo
Hokke-ji bath, with 1766 inscription on ridge tag and water well (法華寺のカラブロ 附 明和三年銘棟札、井戸, Hokke-ji no karaburo tsuketari meiwa san-nen mei-munafuda, ido)	7	Hokke-ji, Nara, Nara
Yu-no-yama old hot spring spot (湯ノ山明神旧湯治場, Yu no yama myōjin kyūtōjiba)	7, 6	Wada, Yuki-chō, Saeki, Hiroshima, Hiroshima
Kishimi no ishiburo (岸見の石風呂)	7	Hachiman, Kishimi, Tokuji, Yamaguchi, Yamaguchi
Kuka no ishiburo (久賀の石風呂)	7	Kuka, Suō-Ōshima, Yamaguchi
Yamaga no ishiburo (山香の石風呂)	7	Nagata, Yamaura, Yamagamachi, Kitsuki, Ōita
Ozaki no ishiburo (尾崎の石風呂)	7	Oate, Ogatamachi, Bungo-ōno, Ōita

=== Folk entertainment, amusement, games ===
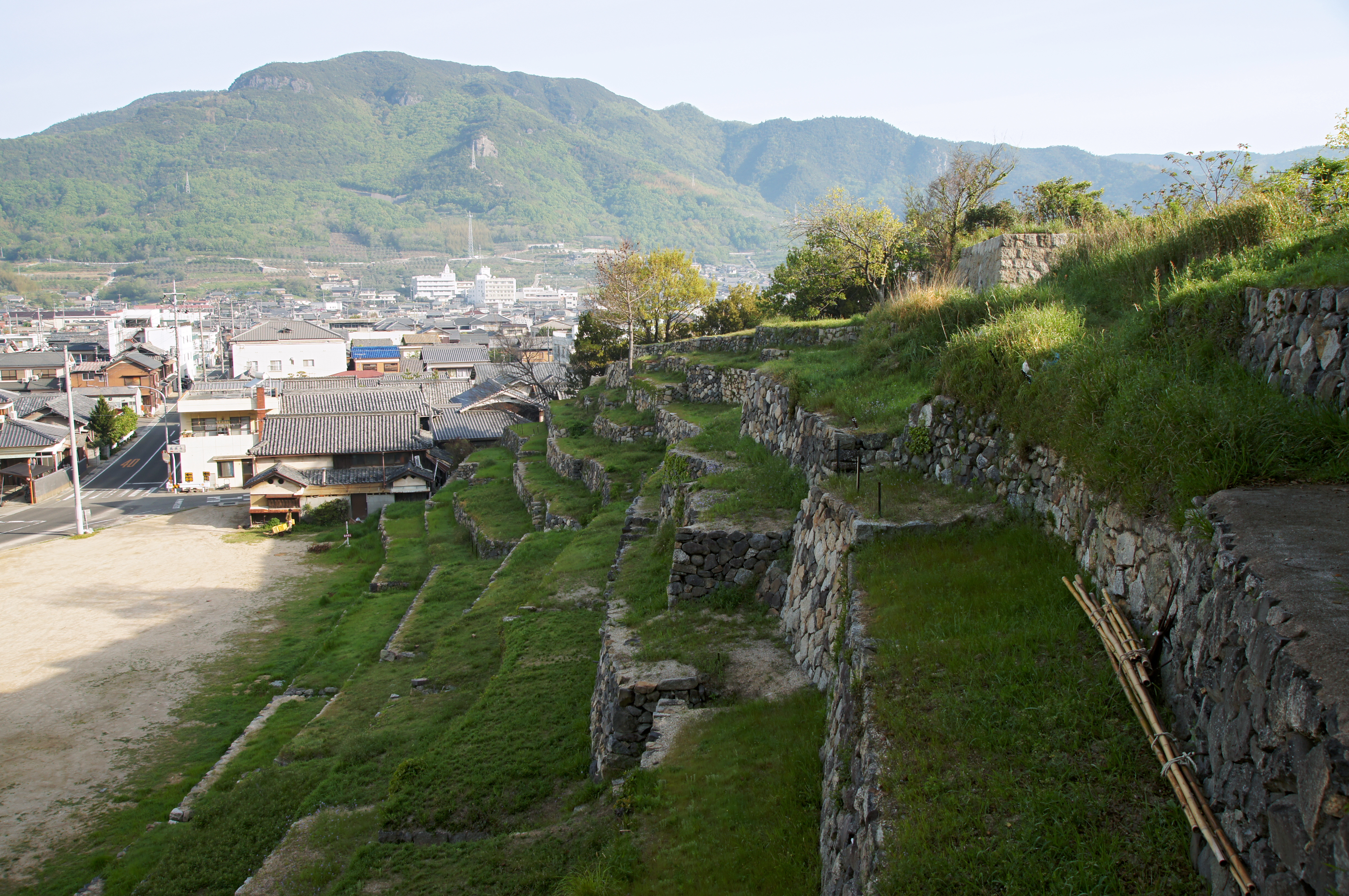
Ikeda no sajiki

Folk entertainment, amusement, games
Name	Criteria	Location
Ōmomo stage (大桃の舞台, ōmomo no butai)	1.8	Ōmomo, Minamiaizu, Fukushima
Hinoemata stage (檜枝岐の舞台, hinoemata no butai)	1.8	Shimonohara, Hinoemata, Fukushima
Kamimiharada Kabuki stage (上三原田の歌舞伎舞台, kamimiharada no kabuki butai)	1.8	Kamimiharada, Akagi, Shibukawa, Gunma
Kyūfunakoshi (旧船越の舞台, kyūfunakoshi no butai)	1.8	Nihon Minka-en, Kawasaki, Kanagawa
Shimokuroda stage (下黒田の舞台, shimokuroda no butai)	1.8	Kamisatokuroda, Iida, Nagano
Kagami stage (各務の舞台, kagami no butai)	1.8	Kagamiogase-chō, Kakamigahara, Gifu
Lion mask collection and Hida lion dance articles (獅子頭コレクションと飛騨の獅子舞用具, shishikashira korekushon to hida no shishimai yōgu)	1.8, 1.6, 2.3	Gifu
Makuwa puppet theatre stage (真桑の人形舞台, makuwa no ningyō butai)	1.8	Kamimakuwa, Motosu, Gifu
Kadowasa stage (門和佐の舞台, kadowasa no butai)	1.8	Kadowasa, Gero, Gifu
Shimotanigami stage (下谷上の舞台, shimotanigami no butai)	1.7	Kitayamadacho, Kōbe, Hyōgo
Kazurahata stage (Shibaidō) (葛畑の舞台(芝居堂), kazurahata no butai (shibaidō))	1.7	Kazurahata, Yabu, Hyōgo
Kamimikawa stage (上三河の舞台, kamimikawa no butai)	1.7	Kamimikawa, Sayō, Hyōgo
Tanokuma stage (田熊の舞台, tanokuma no butai)	1.8	Tanokuma, Tsuyama, Okayama
Akasaki Shrine Outdoor Theatre (赤崎神社楽桟敷, akasaki jinja gaku sajiki)	1.8	Higashifukawa, Nagato, Yamaguchi
Inukai stage (犬飼の舞台, inukai no butai)	1.8	Goō Shrine, Hachiya, Hata-chō, Tokushima, Tokushima
Sakashū stage (坂州の舞台, sakashū no butai)	1.8	Hachiman Shrine, Sakashū, Naka, Tokushima
Ikeda reviewing stand (池田の桟敷, ikeda no sajiki)	1.6, 1.7	Kameyama Hachiman Shrine, Ikeda, Shōdoshima, Kagawa
Nakayama stage (中山の舞台, nakayama no butai)	1.8	Kasuga Shrine, Nakayama, Shōdoshima, Kagawa
Hitoyama stage (肥土山の舞台, hitoyama no butai)	1.8	Rikyū Hachiman Shrine, Hitoyama, Tonoshō, Kagawa
Takano stage (高野の舞台, takano no butai)	1.8, 1.6	Mishima Shrine, Takano, Tsuno, Kōchi
Yashiro stage (八代の舞台, yashiro no butai)	1.8	Hachiman Shrine, Ino, Kōchi
Puppets (傀儡子, kugutsu)	1.6, 1.8, 2.2	Hachiman Koyō Shrine, Yoshitomi, Fukuoka
Puppets (傀儡子, kugutsu)	1.6, 1.8, 2.2	Koyō Shrine, Nakatsu, Ōita

=== Related to the life of people ===
Related to the life of people
Name	Criteria	Location
Articles related to the human life of people in Hakusan Nishitani and a private house (白山麓西谷の人生儀礼用具及び民家, hakusanroku nishitani no jinsei girei yōgu oyobi minka)	1, 9, 3	Komatsu Municipal Museum, Komatsu, Ishikawa
Articles related to the human life, celebrations and death of people in Okumino (奥美濃の人生儀礼用具 附 祝儀・不祝儀帳等, okumino no jinsei girei yōgu tsuketari jūgi fushūgicho tō)	9, 3	Meihō Folk Museum, Gujō, Gifu
Name register and kurobako (名つけ帳・黒箱, natsukechō kurobako)	9, 1, 3	Wakayama Prefectural Museum, Wakayama, Wakayama

=== Annual functions or events ===
Annual functions or events
Name	Criteria	Location
Koshōgatsu articles from Jōshū (上州の小正月ツクリモノ, jōshū no koshōgatsu tsukurimono)	10	Gunma Prefectural Museum of History, Takasaki, Gunma
Collection of Tanabata dolls (七夕人形コレクション, tanabata ningyō korekushon)	3, 8, 10	Matsumoto City Museum, Matsumoto, Nagano
Uto rainmaking Ōdaiko and related articles (宇土の雨乞い大太鼓 附関連資料, uto no amagoi ōdaiko tsuketari kannen shiryō)	10, 3	Uto City Ōdaiko Collection Hall (宇土市大太鼓収蔵館), Uto, Kumamoto
