= Seito =

Seito (せいと), Seitō, Seitou or Seitoh (せいとう) may refer to:

== People ==
- Seito Saibara (西原 清東, Saibara Seitō; 1861–1939), Japanese parliament member
- Seito Sakakibara (酒鬼薔薇 聖斗, Sakakibara Seito), alias of the perpetrator of the Kobe child murders
- Seito Yamamoto (山本 聖途, Yamamoto Seito; born 1992), Japanese pole vaulter

== Places ==
- Seito (西都), the historical name for Dazaifu and Dazaifu, Fukuoka
- Seito (成都), the Japanese name for Chengdu
- Seito (西都), the fictional place in Kamen Rider Build
- Seito (青島), a Japanese name for Qingdao

== Other uses ==
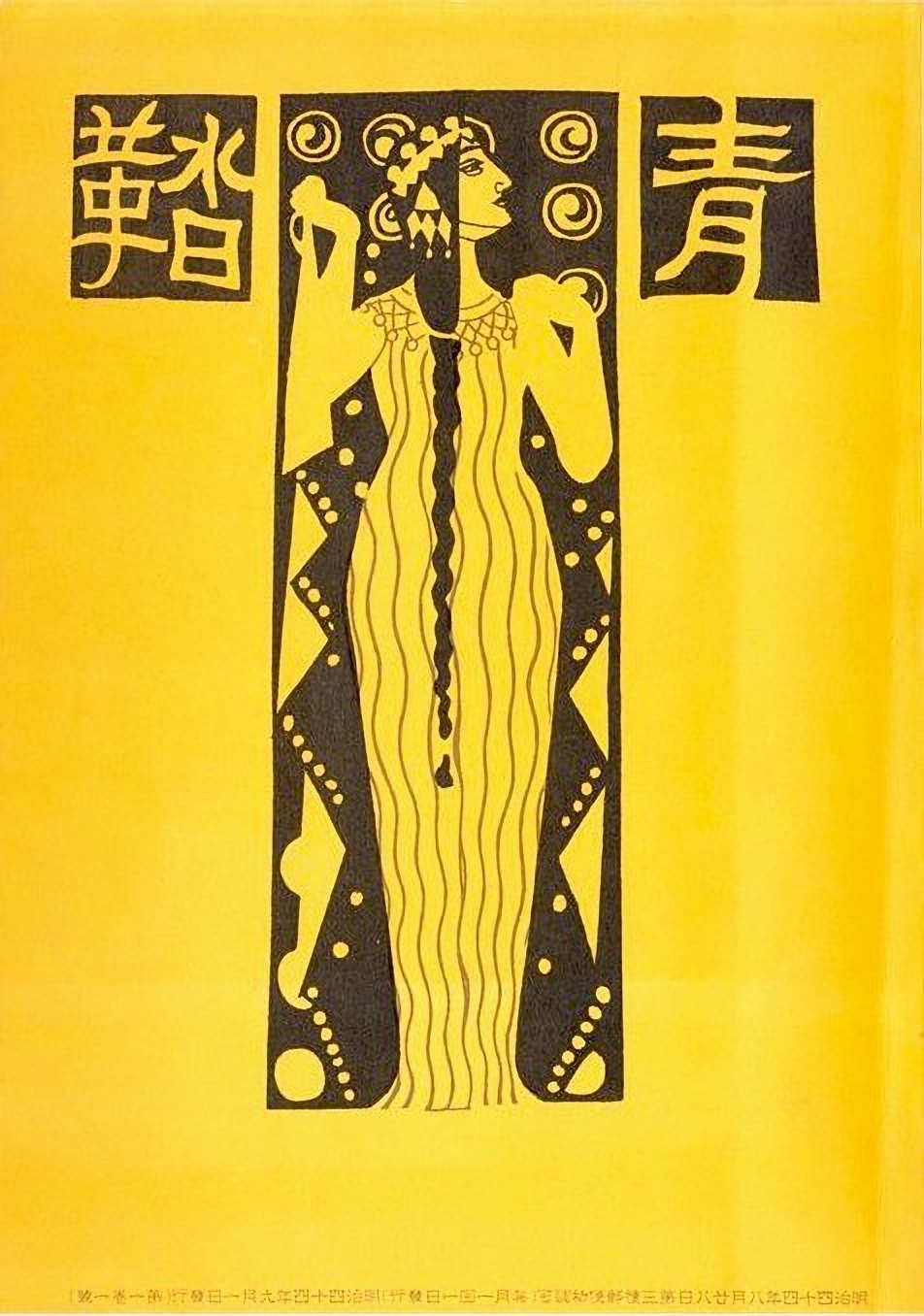
The first issue of Seitō with cover illustration by Chieko Naganuma

- Seitō (magazine) (青鞜) or Bluestocking, a literary magazine created in 1911

== See also ==
- Seitō Shoin Teien (清藤氏書院庭園), Seitō-shi Shoin Teien), a Japanese dry landscape garden
