= Aomori Museum of History =

- あおもり北のまほろば歴史館
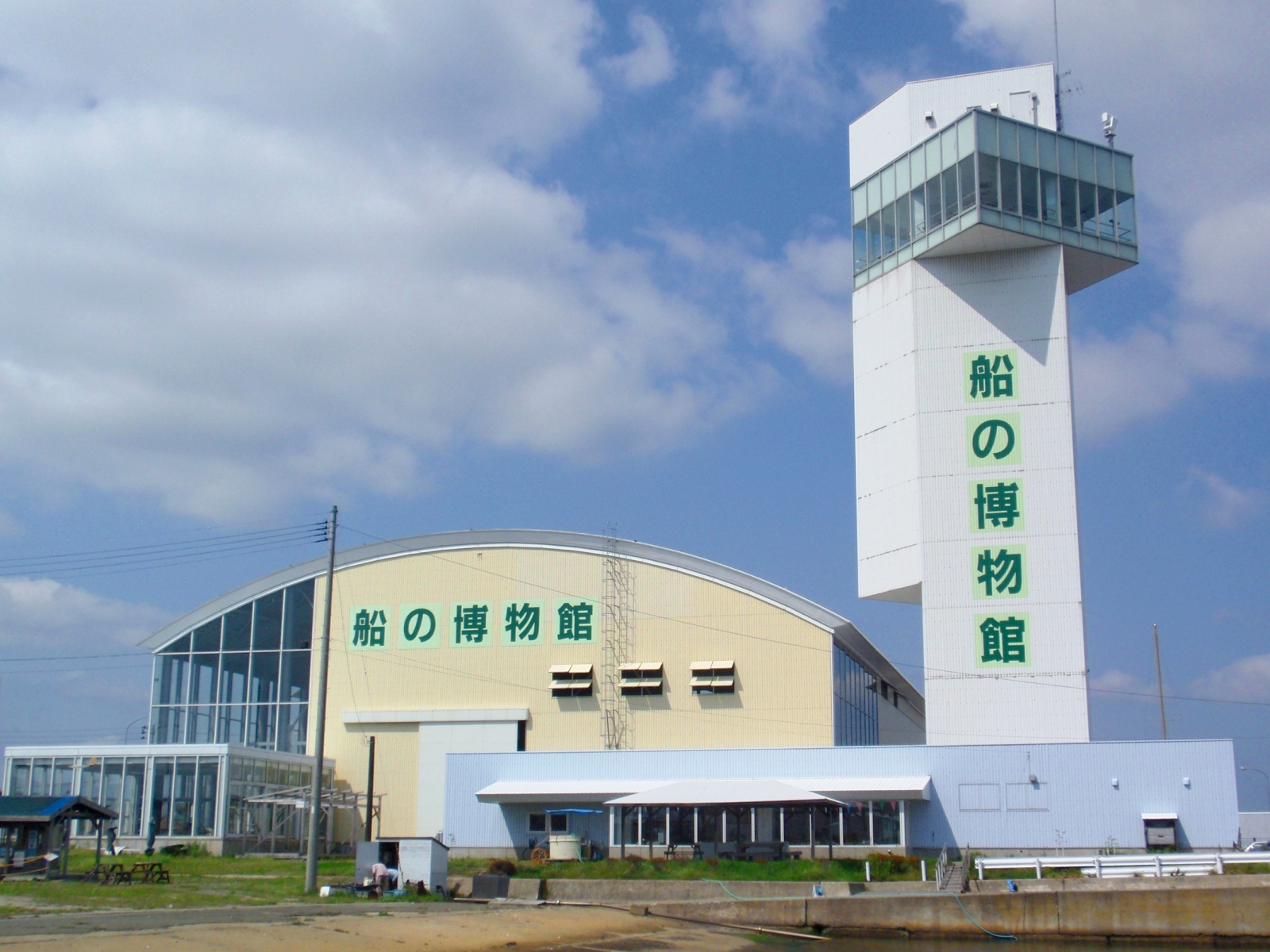

General information
- Location: 2-1 Okidate ni-chōme, Aomori, Aomori Prefecture, Japan
- Coordinates: 40°50′14″N 140°43′31″E
- Opened: July 2015

Website
- Official website

Aomori Museum of History (あおもり北のまほろば歴史館, Aomori Kita no Mahoroba Rekishi-kan) opened in Aomori, Aomori Prefecture, Japan, in 2015. Formerly the Michinoku Traditional Wooden Boat Museum (みちのく北方漁船博物館, Michinoku Hoppyō Gyosen Hakubutsukan), the collection introduces the history and folk culture of Aomori City and includes the Important Tangible Folk Cultural Property Collection of mudamahagi fishing boats from Tsugaru Strait and surrounding areas.

== See also ==
- List of Historic Sites of Japan (Aomori)
- Mutsu Province
- Aomori Prefectural Museum
- List of Important Tangible Folk Cultural Properties
