= Zuiraku-en =

Japanese dry landscape garden in Hirosaki, Aomori, Japan

- 瑞楽園
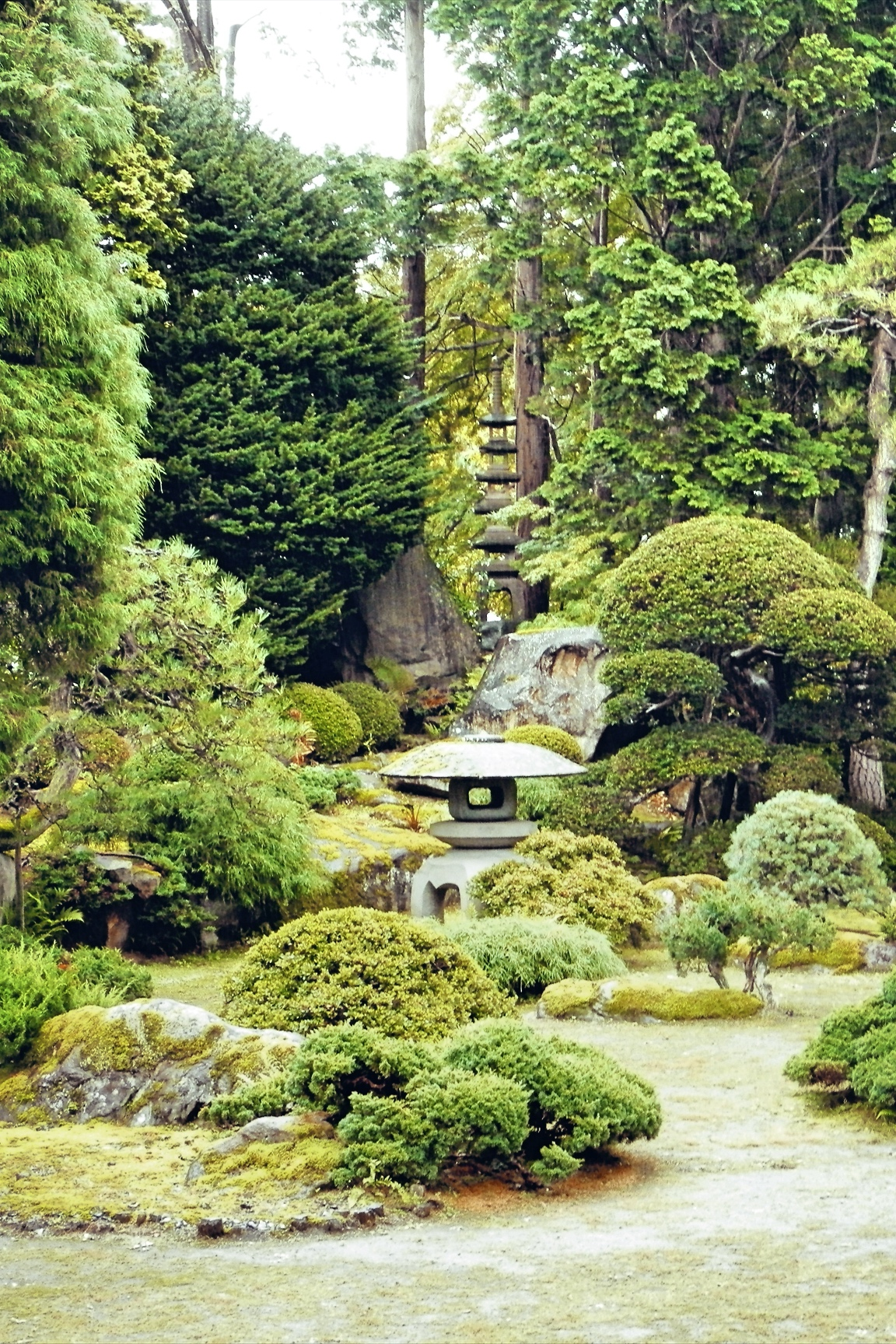
- Zuiraku-en

- Location within Aomori Prefecture Location within Japan
- Type: Urban park
- Location: Hirosaki, Aomori, Japan
- Coordinates: 40°38′58″N 140°24′49″E
- Area: 4,900 square metres (1.2 acres)
- Created: 1890-1936
- Operator: Hirosaki city
- Status: Open 20 April to 20 November
- National Palace of Scenic Beauty

Zuiraku-en (瑞楽園) (also Tsushima Family Gardens) is a Japanese dry landscape garden and nationally designated Place of Scenic Beauty in the city of Hirosaki, Aomori Prefecture, Japan. The gardens are a nationally designated Place of Scenic Beauty.

== Overview ==
This garden was laid out in the late Meiji period and early Shōwa period as a Shoin-teien for the Tsushima family, who were very wealthy landlords under Hirosaki Domain in the Edo period. During the first phase of construction, from 1890 to 1905, Takahashi Teizan, the leading gardener of the Oishi Bugaku Ryu style of Japanese gardens, initiated the project. This was completed by two of his pupils from 1928 to 1936.

The garden occupies the wide space to the south side of a shoin-style building constructed in 1839. The garden features a dry fall, a dry pond and a stone bridge across the pond. A low miniature hill at the right side and a taller hill on the left side flank the garden, which also contains large rocks and tōrō (Japanese stone lanterns). The original design drawings of the gardens are also preserved at the site.

== See also ==
- List of Places of Scenic Beauty of Japan (Aomori)
