= List of cultural properties of Japan – paintings (Aomori) =

This list is of the cultural properties of Japan designated in the category of paintings (絵画, kaiga) for the Prefecture of Aomori.

== National Cultural Properties ==
As of 1 July 2019, zero properties have been designated as being of national significance.

== Prefectural Cultural Properties ==
As of 26 March 2019, six properties have been designated at a prefectural level.

Property	Date	Municipality	Ownership	Comments	Image	Dimensions	Coordinates	Ref.
Byōbu with map of the world 世界地図屏風 sekai chizu byōbu	early Edo period	Aomori	private	6 panels			40°49′34″N 140°45′00″E	
Shinran and associated figures 親鸞上人連座御影; Shinran shōnin renza miei	Muromachi period	Ajigasawa	Raishō-ji (来生寺)	1 scroll, colours on silk; at the top is Hōnen and, below, Shinran (founder of the Jōdo Shinshū school) and his disciples		143.0 centimetres (56.3 in) by 48.0 centimetres (18.9 in)	40°46′57″N 140°12′05″E	
Amida Nyorai 阿弥陀如来像; Amida Nyorai zō	Muromachi period	Ajigasawa	Raishō-ji (来生寺)	1 scroll, colours on silk; the 48 rays of light symbolise Amida's 48 vows		134.0 centimetres (52.8 in) by 38.0 centimetres (15.0 in)	40°46′57″N 140°12′05″E	
Taima Mandala, colours on silk 絹本著色当麻曼荼羅図 kenpon chakushoku Taima Mandara-zu	Kamakura period	Hirosaki	Teishō-ji (貞昌寺)	displayed every year at the spring and autumn equinox; affected by flaking			40°35′39″N 140°27′42″E	
Byōbu with scenes of cherry- and maple-viewing, colours on paper (by the brush of Arai Seihō) 新井晴峰筆紙本著色観桜観楓図屏風; Arai Seihō-hitsu shihon chakushoku kanō kanpō-zu byōbu	late Edo period	Hirosaki	Hirosaki City (at Hirosaki City Museum)	pair of screens, each with 6 panels			40°36′19″N 140°27′45″E	
Shōbō, colours on silk 絹本著色聖宝僧正像 kenpon chakushoku Shōbō sōjō zō	C14 (first half)	Fukaura	Engaku-ji (円覚寺)	1 scroll; brought to Engaku-ji in the Meiji period; during repairs in 2003 two paper slips dating to repairs in 1772 were discovered, documenting that prior to that year the painting was housed in the Jōrokudō at Daigo-ji, founded by Shōbō; there are few mediaeval images of important non-Zen Buddhist figures in Tōhoku			40°38′32″N 139°55′22″E	

== See also ==
- Cultural Properties of Japan
- Japanese painting
- List of Historic Sites of Japan (Aomori)
- Aomori Prefectural Museum
