= Hokkaido Museum of Northern Peoples =

- 北海道立北方民族博物館
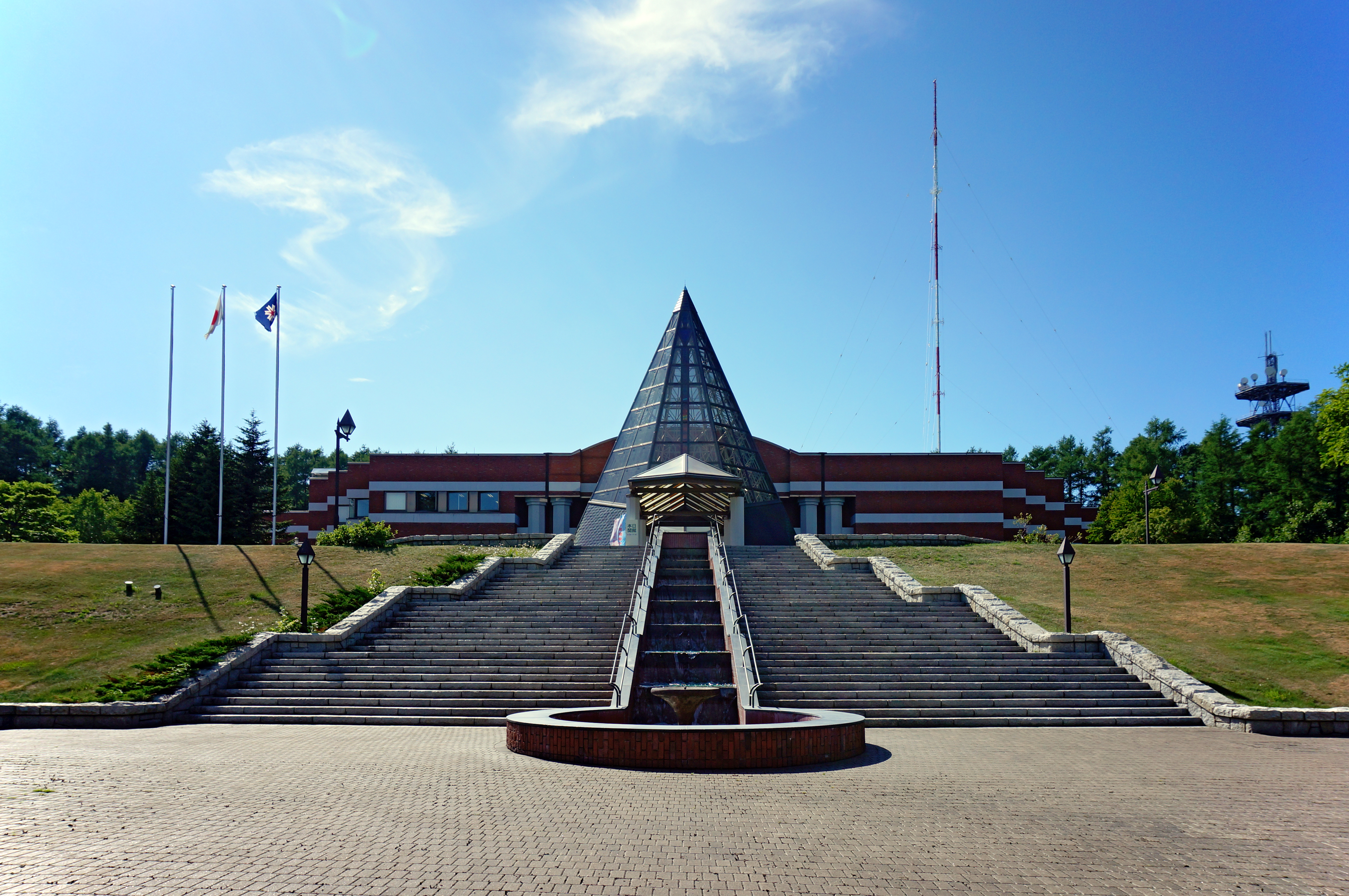

- Location within Hokkaido Location within Japan

General information
- Location: 309-1 Shiomi, Abashiri, Hokkaidō, Japan
- Coordinates: 43°59′49″N 144°14′23″E
- Opened: 10 February 1991

Website
- Official website

The Hokkaido Museum of Northern Peoples (北海道立北方民族博物館, Hokkaidō-ritsu Hoppō Minzoku Hakubutsukan) opened in Abashiri, Hokkaidō, Japan in 1991. Dedicated to the various peoples of the North, across Eurasia and the Americas, the collection includes items relating to the Sámi, Nanai, Nivkhs, and Northwest Coast Indians, as well as the more local Okhotsk culture and Ainu.

== See also ==
- Hokkaido Museum
- Hakodate City Museum of Northern Peoples
- List of Historic Sites of Japan (Hokkaidō)
