= Tōkamachi City Museum =

Museum in Kashiba, Nara, Japan

- 十日町市博物館
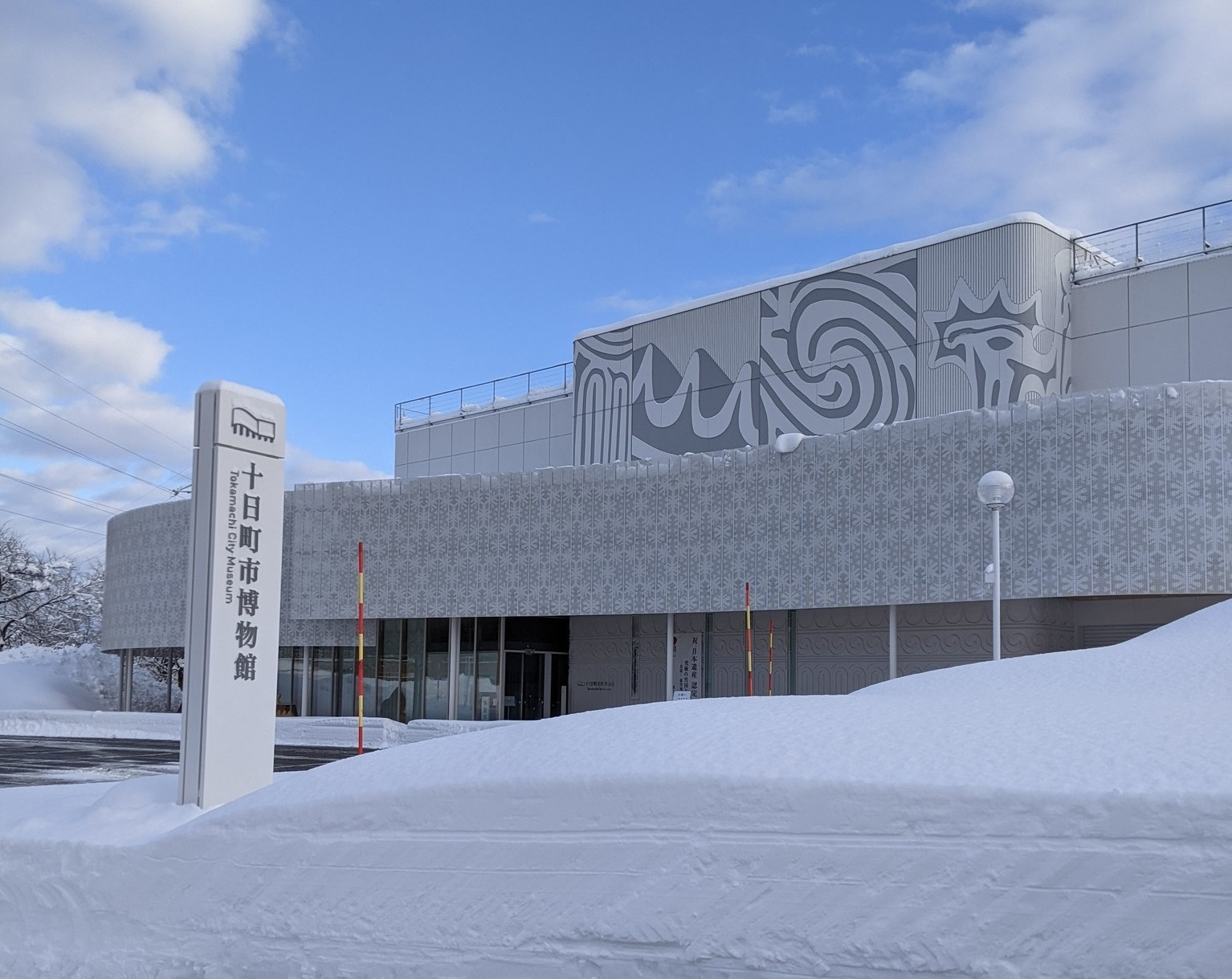

General information
- Location: 1-448-9 Nishihon-chō, Tōkamachi, Niigata Prefecture, Japan
- Coordinates: 37°08′27″N 138°45′25″E
- Opened: April 1979

Website
- Official website

Tōkamachi City Museum (十日町市博物館, Tōkamachi-shi Hakubutsukan) opened in Tōkamachi, Niigata Prefecture, Japan in 1979, reopening in a new building in 2020. The collection includes a grouping of 57 Jōmon pots from Sasayama Site that has been designated a National Treasure.

== Gallery ==
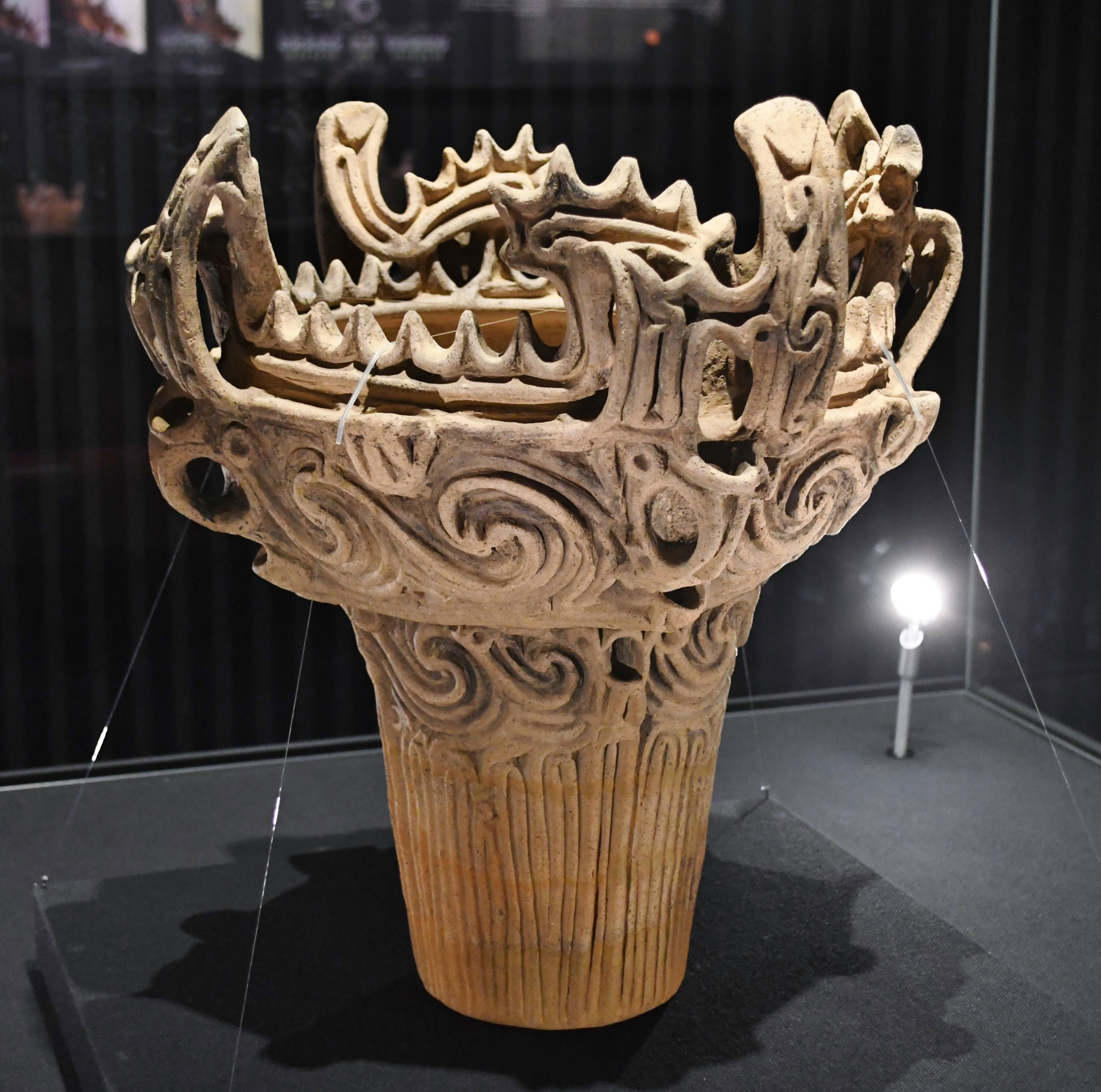
Fire-flame pot (NT)

== See also ==
- List of National Treasures of Japan (archaeological materials)
- List of Important Tangible Folk Cultural Properties
- Niigata Prefectural Museum of History
