= Kanehiranari-en =

Park in Aomori Prefecture, Japan

- 金平成園
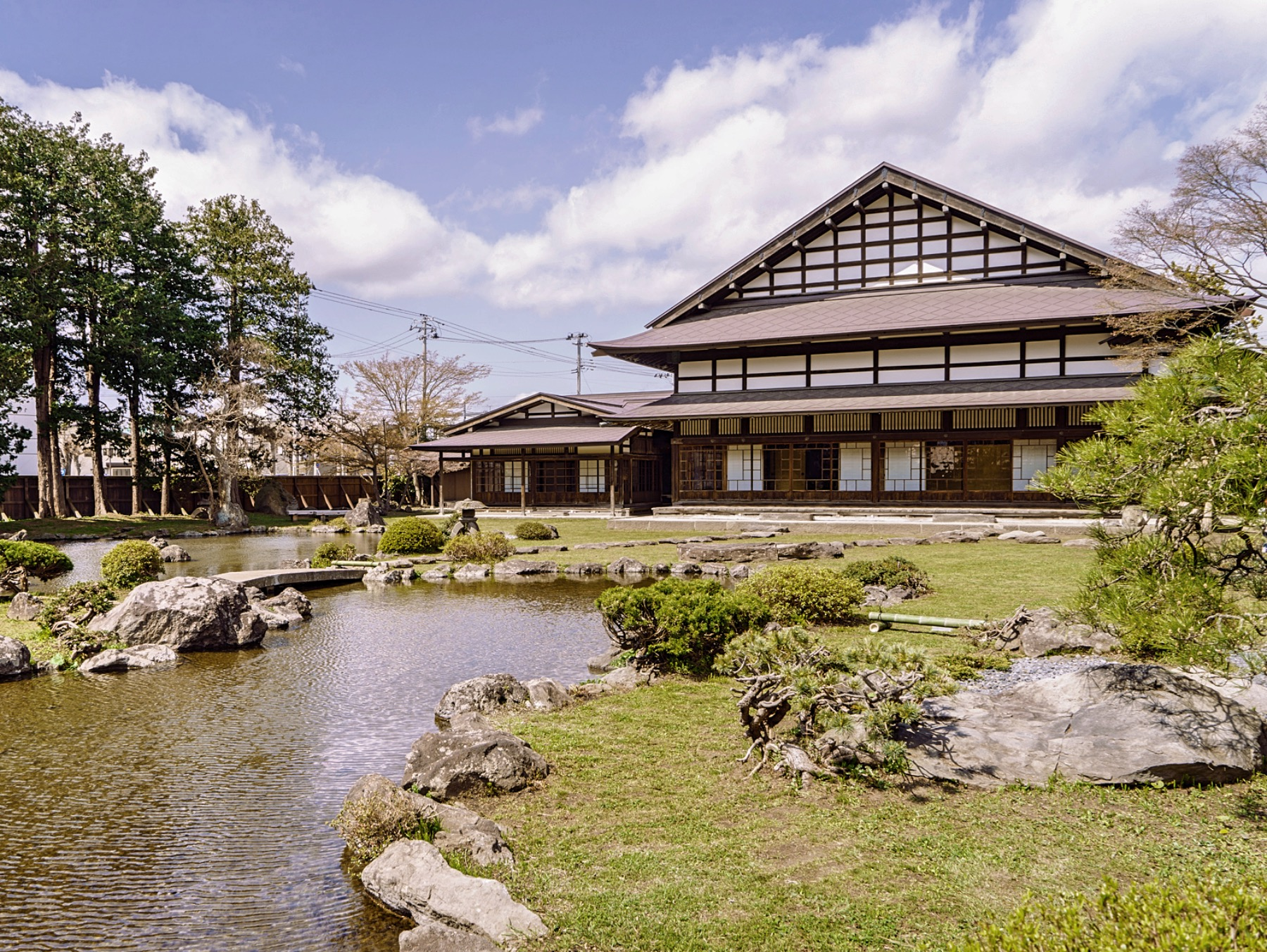
- Kanehiranari-en

- Location within Aomori Prefecture Location within Japan
- Type: Urban park
- Location: Kuroishi, Aomori, Japan
- Coordinates: 40°38′36.3″N 140°35′33″E
- Area: 5,662 square metres (1.399 acres)
- Created: 1882-1902
- Operator: Kuroishi city
- Status: Open May through November
- National Palace of Scenic Beauty

Kanehiranari-en (金平成園), also known as Sawanari-en (澤成園) is a Japanese landscape garden and nationally designated Place of Scenic Beauty in the city of Kuroishi, Aomori Prefecture, Japan.

== Overview ==
This garden was laid out in the late Meiji period Katō Uehei, a wealthy local businessman and politician, and was initially intended as a work of charity to provide employment to impoverished local farmers. It was designed by Takahashi Teizan, the leading gardener of the Oishi Bugaku Ryu style of Japanese gardens in 1882 and was completed by two of his pupils in 1902. The garden consists of a large pond on the left hand side of the main building with a complex stone-structured shoreline. Stepping stones extend from the main building in two directions, and the garden is studded with large megaliths, including a large conical mound intended to emulate Mount Iwaki and several stone Tōrō (Japanese lanterns).

On the west side of the garden is the former Katō family residence, which consists of a main house and a detached tea room, which were constructed in 1902. The garden remained in private hands until it was donated to Kuroishi city in November 2019.

The gardens are about an eight minute walk from Kuroishi Station on the Kōnan Line.

== See also ==
- List of Places of Scenic Beauty of Japan (Aomori)
