= Yonezawa City Uesugi Museum =

- 米沢市上杉博物館
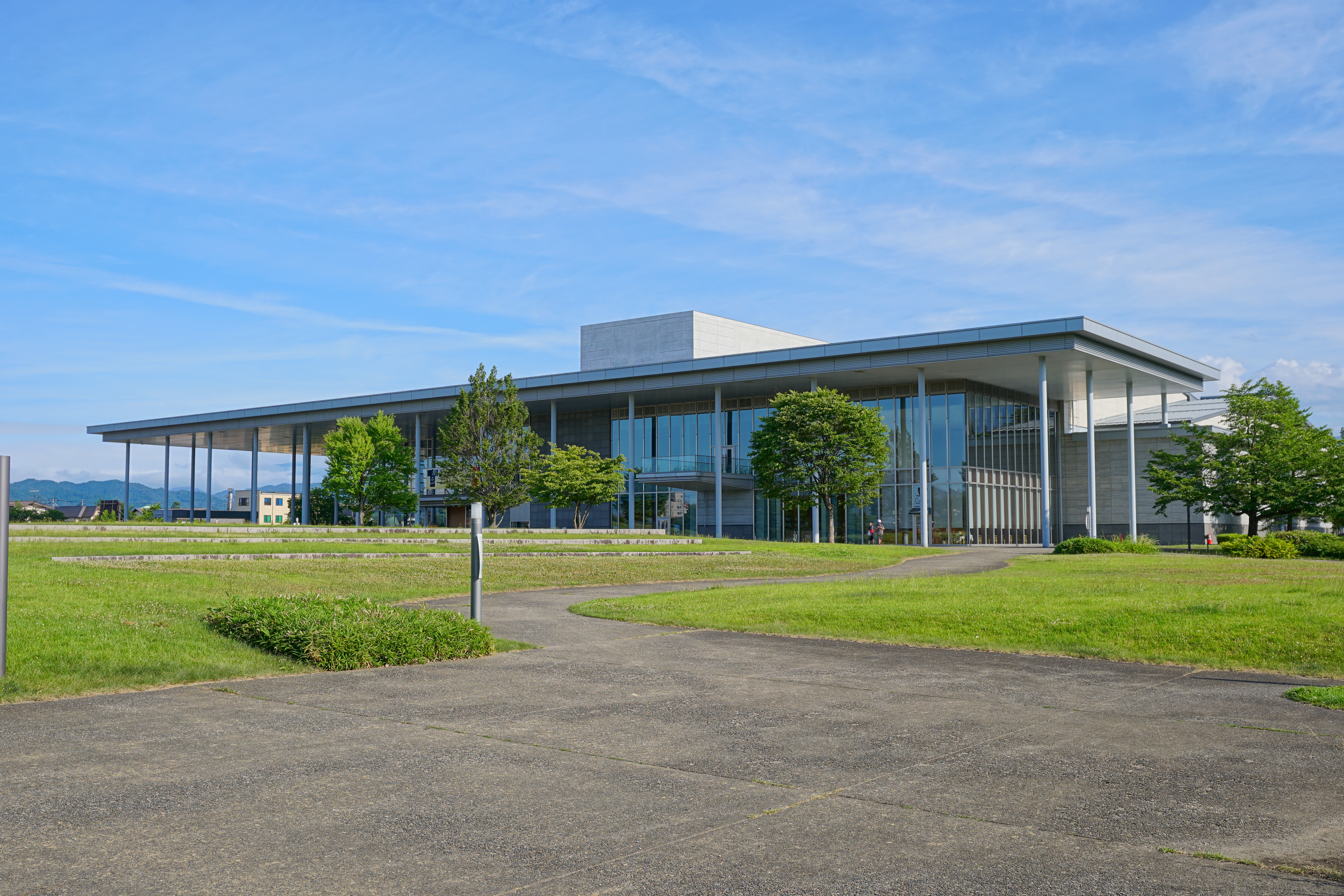

General information
- Location: 1-2-1 Marunouchi, Yonezawa, Yamagata Prefecture, Japan
- Coordinates: 37°54′27″N 140°06′24″E
- Opened: 29 September 2001

Website
- Official website

Yonezawa City Uesugi Museum (米沢市上杉博物館, Yonezawa-shi Uesugi hakubutsukan) opened in the former grounds of Yonezawa Castle in Yonezawa, Yamagata Prefecture, Japan, in 2001. The collection of some 18,800 objects includes the National Treasures Scenes In and Around the Capital (紙本金地著色洛中洛外図), by Kanō Eitoku, and Uesugi Family Documents (上杉家文書).

== See also ==
- Yamagata Prefectural Museum
- List of National Treasures of Japan (paintings)
- List of National Treasures of Japan (ancient documents)
- List of Important Tangible Folk Cultural Properties
