= Kiyose City Folk Museum =

- Location within Japan
- Established: 1985
- Location: 2-6-41 Kamikiyoto, Kiyose, Tokyo 997-0036 Japan
- Coordinates: 35.779761°N 139.520948°E
- Type: Folk museum
- Public transit access: Kiyose Station

The Kiyose City Folk Museum (清瀬市郷土博物館, Kiyose-shi kyōdo hakubutsukan) is a folk museum in Kiyose, Tokyo. It was established in November 1985 and — unlike other municipal museums at the time — the aim was to go beyond the mere display of items and to provide an interactive personal experience.

== See also ==
- List of Important Tangible Folk Cultural Properties
