= Hirosaki City Museum =

- 弘前市立博物館
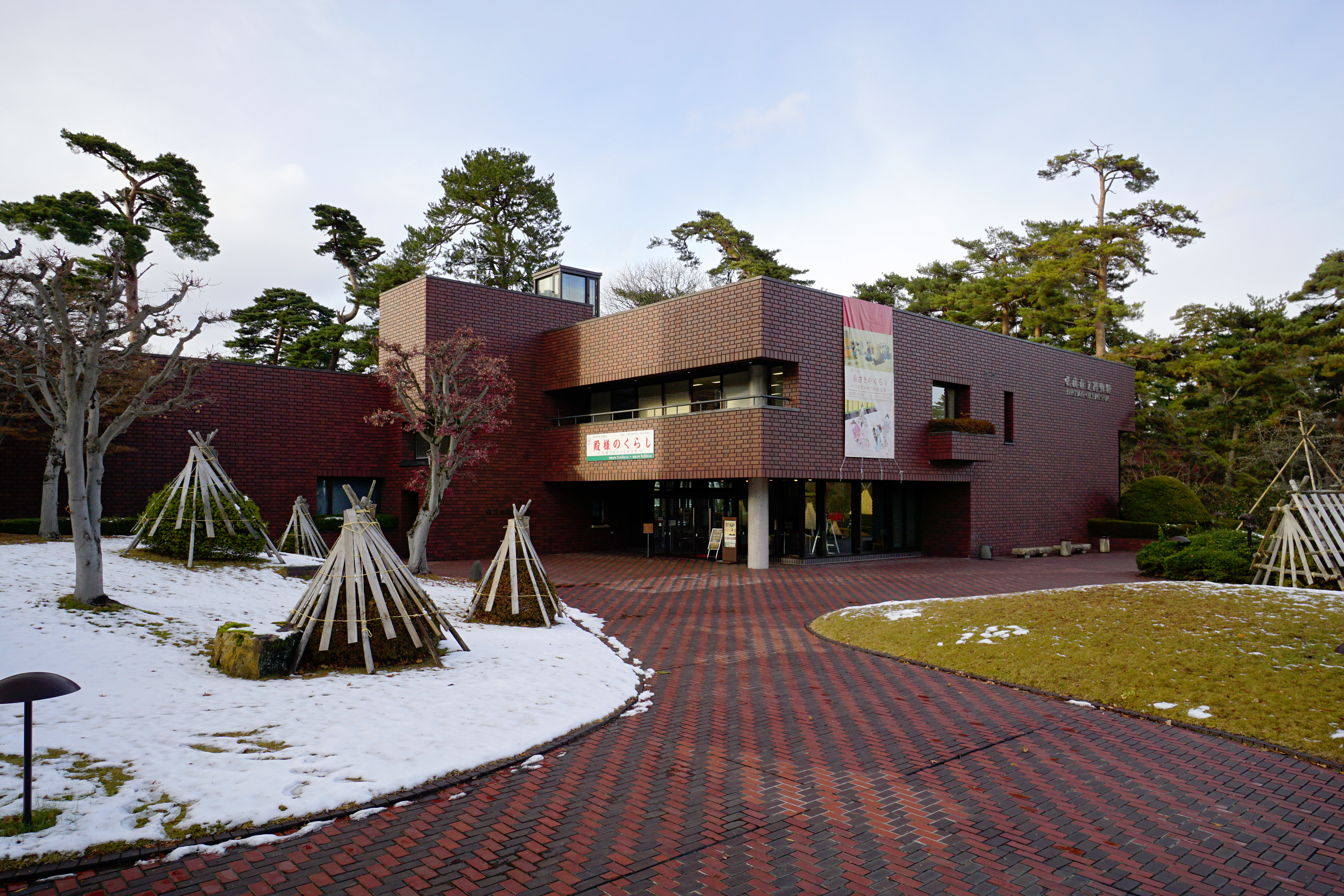

General information
- Location: 1-6 Shimoshirogane-chō, Hirosaki, Aomori Prefecture, Japan
- Coordinates: 40°36′19″N 140°27′45″E
- Opened: 20 April 1977

Website
- Official website

Hirosaki City Museum (弘前市立博物館, Hirosaki Shiritsu Hakubutsukan) opened in Hirosaki, Aomori Prefecture, Japan in 1977. It lies within Hirosaki Park, in the former grounds of Hirosaki Castle. As of March 2016, the collection numbered some eighteen thousand items, including an assemblage of artefacts excavated from the Sunazawa Site that have been designated an Important Cultural Property.

== See also ==
- List of Historic Sites of Japan (Aomori)
- Aomori Prefectural Museum
