= Hakodate City Museum of Northern Peoples =

Building in Hakodate, Hokkaido Prefecture, Japan

- 函館市北方民族資料館
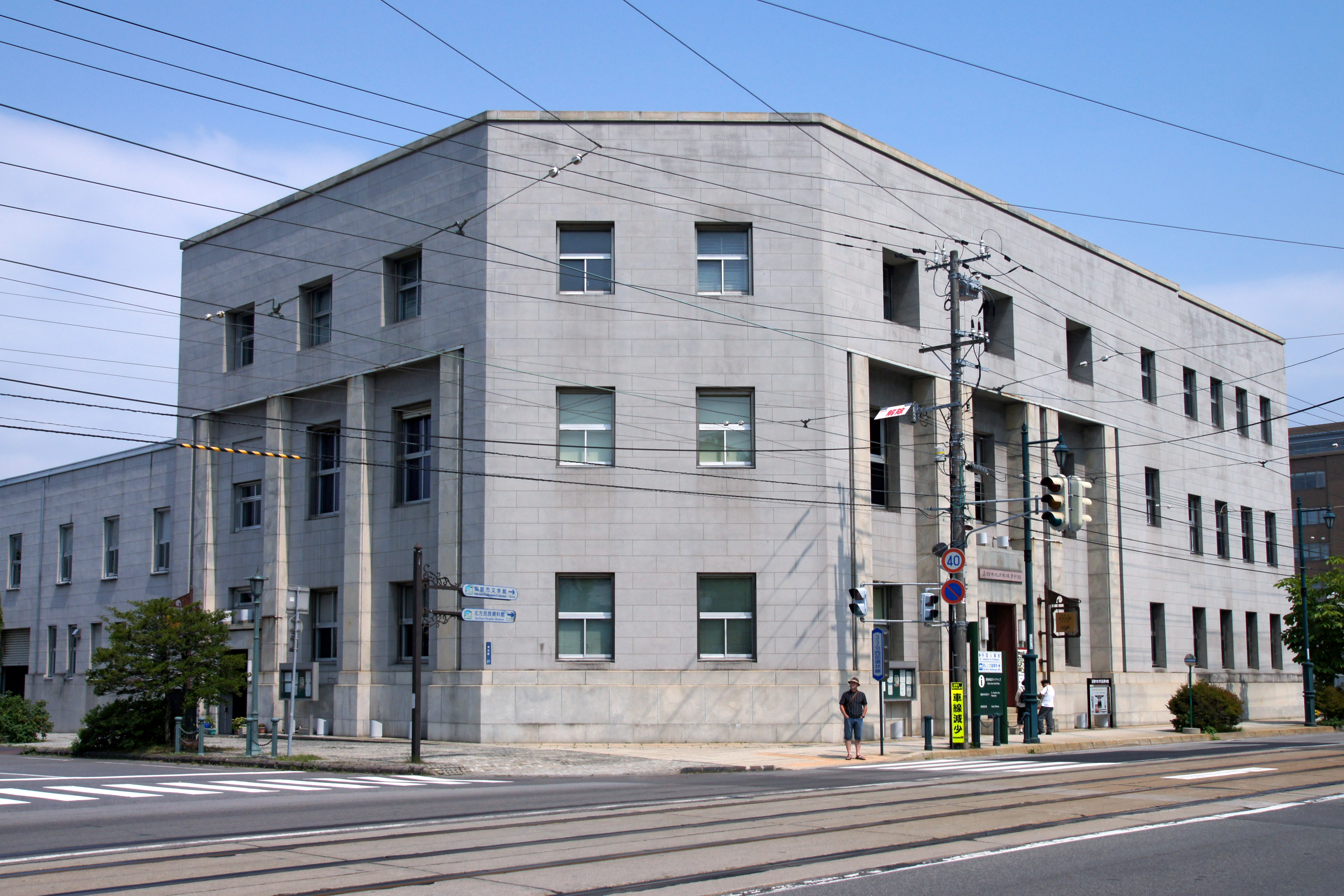
- Interactive map of the Hakodate City Museum of Northern Peoples area

General information
- Location: 21-7 Suehiro-chō, Hakodate, Hokkaidō, Japan
- Coordinates: 41°46′02″N 140°42′43″E
- Opened: November 1989

Website
- Official website

Hakodate City Museum of Northern Peoples (函館市北方民族資料館, Hakodate-shi Hoppō Minzoku Shiryōkan) first opened as the Hakodate City Museum of Northern Peoples and Ishikawa Takuboku (函館市北方民族・石川啄木資料館) in Hakodate, Hokkaidō, Japan in 1989. Located in the former Bank of Japan Hakodate Branch building of 1926, after the transfer of materials relating to the poet to the Hakodate City Museum of Literature (函館市文学館), the museum reopened in its current guise in April 1993. It displays objects that were formerly part of the collection of the Hakodate City Museum (市立函館博物館), including materials relating to the Orok as well as 750 items used in the daily life of the Ainu that have been jointly designated an Important Tangible Folk Cultural Property.

== See also ==
- Hokkaido Museum of Northern Peoples
- List of Important Tangible Folk Cultural Properties
- Nibutani Ainu Culture Museum
- Hokkaido Museum
- Goryōkaku
