= Hakodate City Museum of Literature =

- 函館市文学館
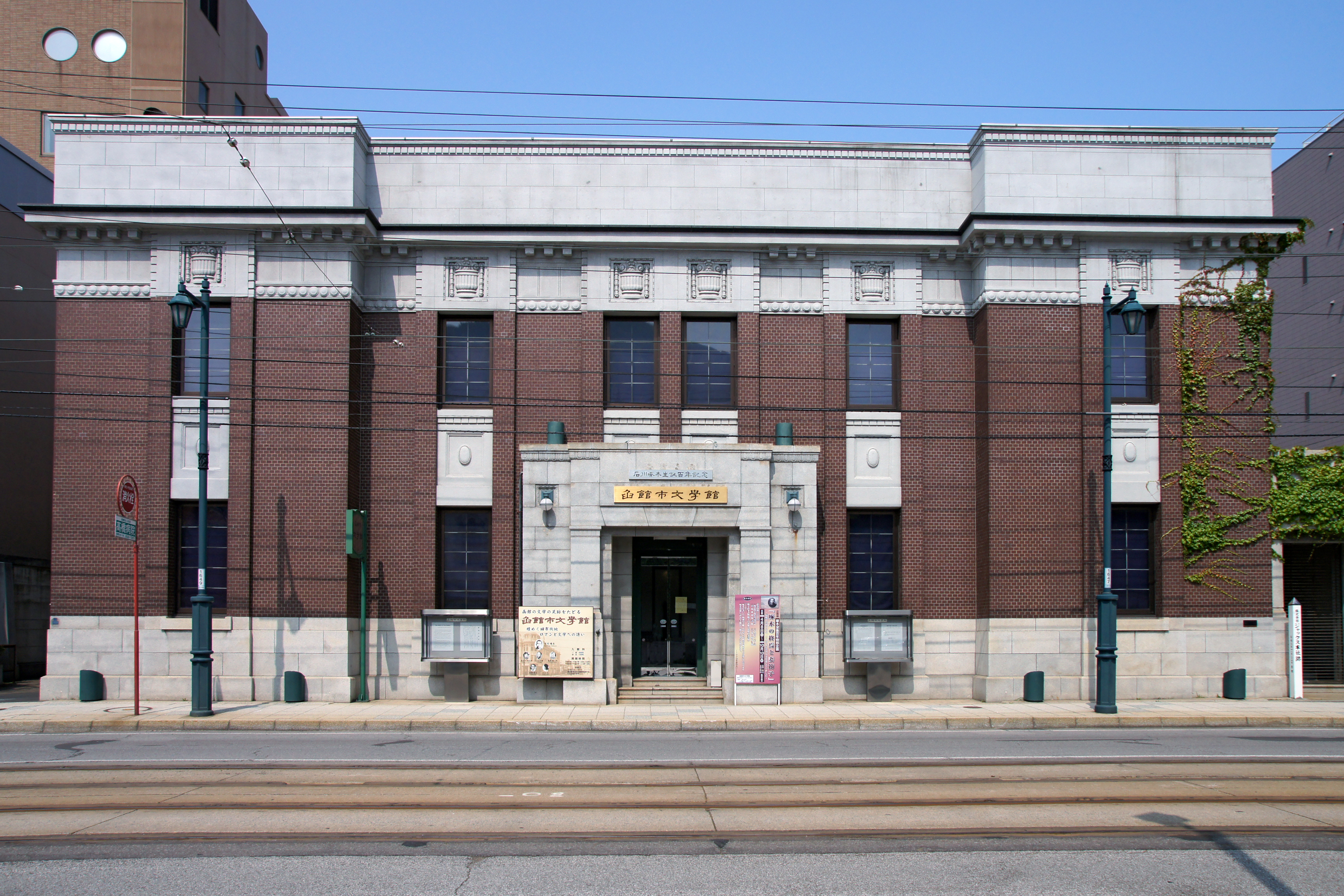
- Interactive map of the Hakodate City Museum of Literature area

General information
- Location: 22-5 Suehiro-chō, Hakodate, Hokkaidō, Japan
- Coordinates: 41°45′59″N 140°42′48″E
- Opened: April 1993

Website
- Official website

The Hakodate City Museum of Literature (函館市文学館, Hakudate-shi Bungaku-kan) opened in Hakodate, Hokkaidō, Japan in 1993. It exhibits materials relating to Ishikawa Takuboku and other contributors to the Hakodate literary scene.

The building in which the museum is housed was constructed in 1921 as the Hakodate Branch of the Dai-Ichi Bank. After the bank moved premises in 1964, the building was taken over by the JACCS company (ja), which donated it to the city in November 1989, to be used for the promotion of culture.

== See also ==
- Hakodate City Museum of Northern Peoples
- Hakodate City Museum
