= Fujizuka =

Manmade hills representing Mount Fuji

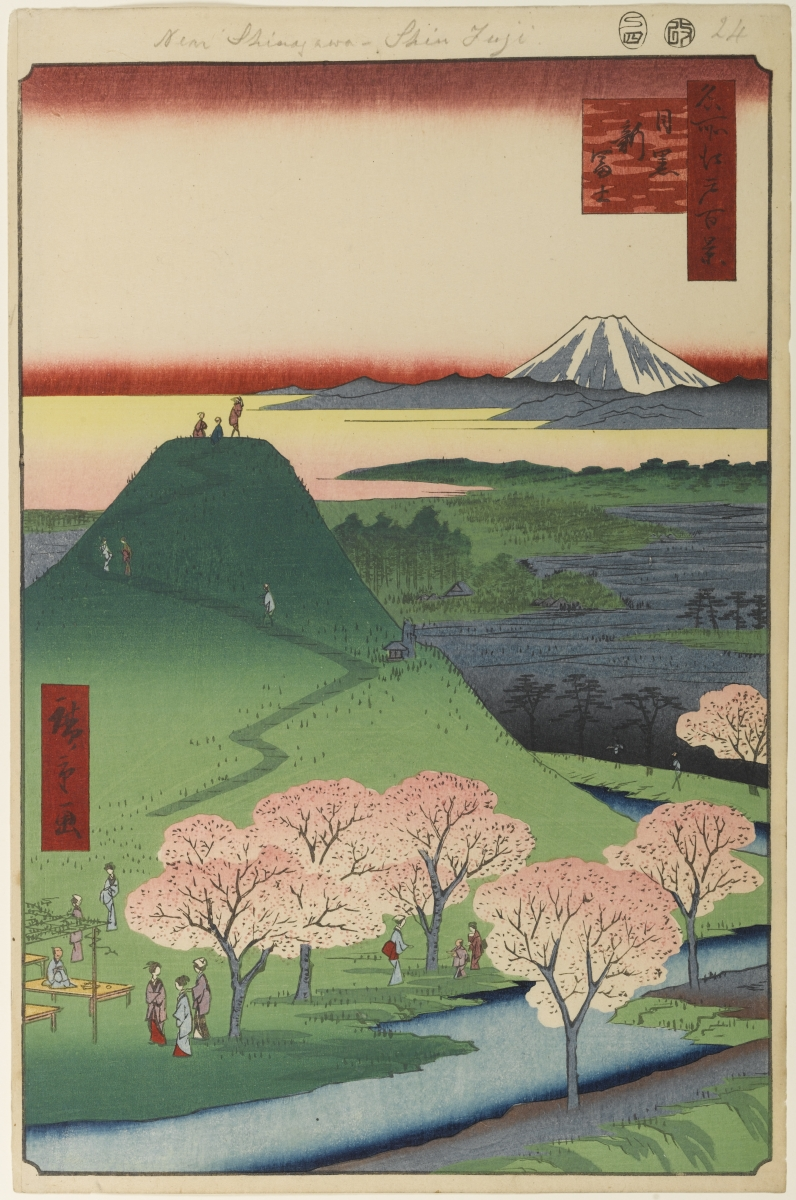
From One Hundred Famous Views of Edo: "New Fuji" in Meguro, with Mount Fuji looming in the distance

Fujizuka (富士塚) are small mounds, commonly found in and around Tokyo, which represent Mount Fuji. During the Edo period (1603–1868), a cult arose around the mountain, one of whose major devotional rites was to climb to the peak. Pilgrims who were unable through age, infirmity or gender to climb Mount Fuji would ascend one of these surrogates instead. They were usually around ten feet high, and replicate the 10 stations on Fuji itself, from the foot of the mountain to the summit. Some were also situated so as to provide pleasant views of their surrounding area, such as the Moto-Fuji at Meguro.

Although they are not included among the objects that make up the Cultural World Heritage Site, there are many Fujizuka that have been designated as Cultural Properties by the national government of Japan or by local governments. Famous Fujizuka within the precincts of Tokyo include the Shitaya-sakamoto Fuji (within the grounds of the Onoterusaki shrine), the Nagasaki Fuji (beside the main shrine building of the Fuji Sengen shrine) and the Ekoda Fuji (within the grounds of the Ekoda Sengen shrine). One such Fujizuka is found at Shinagawa shrine near Shimbamba Station in Tokyo. According to the shrine's kannushi, Mr. Suzuki, the Fujizuka, built between 1869 and 1872, is a relatively late addition, and is said to bestow the same benefit on those who climb it as climbing Mt. Fuji. In the United Kingdom there is a Fujizuka in the grounds of Fanhams Hall, Hertfordshire.
