= Seibi-en =

Garden in Hirakawa, Japan

- 盛美園
- Seibi-en

- Location within Aomori Prefecture Location within Japan
- Type: Urban park
- Location: Hirakawa, Aomori, Japan
- Coordinates: 40°37′00″N 140°34′12″E
- Area: 12,000 square metres (3.0 acres)
- Created: 1901
- Operator: private
- Status: Open mid-April to mid-November
- National Palace of Scenic Beauty

Seibi-en (盛美園) is a Japanese landscape garden and nationally designated Place of Scenic Beauty in the city of Hirakawa, Aomori Prefecture, Japan.

== Overview ==
The garden was laid out between 1902 and 1911 by the 24th generation head of the Seitō family, Seitō Morihide, and covers an area of 9,360 square metres (100,800 sq ft). In the Oishi Bugaku Ryu style of Japanese gardens, it incorporates a large pond, with standing and stepping stones, and stone bridges reminiscent of Momoyama period garden layouts. The gardens are attached to the Seibikan (盛美館), the Giyōfū style mansion that was formerly the residence of the Seitō family. This building is a Meiji-period fusion of Japanese and Western architectural styles, with an octagonal turret, a faux marble pillar in the tokonoma, and tatami floors.

In 2002, the Place of Scenic Beauty designation was expanded by 2100 square meters to encompass the intake weir that led to the pond and the surrounding forest area.

The Seitō family claims descent from Seitō Morihide, a retainer of Hōjō Tokiyori in the Kamakura period. According to legend, Hōjō Tokiyori had an affair with a lady-in-waiting named Karaito Gozen. This incurred the wrath of his wife, and fearing for Karaito Gozen's safety, he entrusted her to Seitō Morihide with orders to hide her in a distant location with promises that they would eventually be reunited. Seitō Morihide took her to distant Tsuruga by sea, to a village in what is now Fujisaki, Aomori. However, after years went by, Karaito Gozen feared that Hōjō Tokiyori had a change of heart and she committed suicide by throwing herself in a pond. Unable to face Tokiyori, Seitō Morihide decided to remain in Tsugaru. His descendants became great landholders. In the Meiji period, Seitō Moriyoshi served as village mayor and founded the Aomori Commercial Bank and Onoe Bank, and eventually became president of Onoe Bank. The garden remains in the hands of his descendants, but is open to the public.

== See also ==
- List of Places of Scenic Beauty of Japan (Aomori)
- Seitō Shoin Teien
