= Seitō Shoin Teien =

Garden in Hirakawa, Japan

- 清藤氏書院庭園
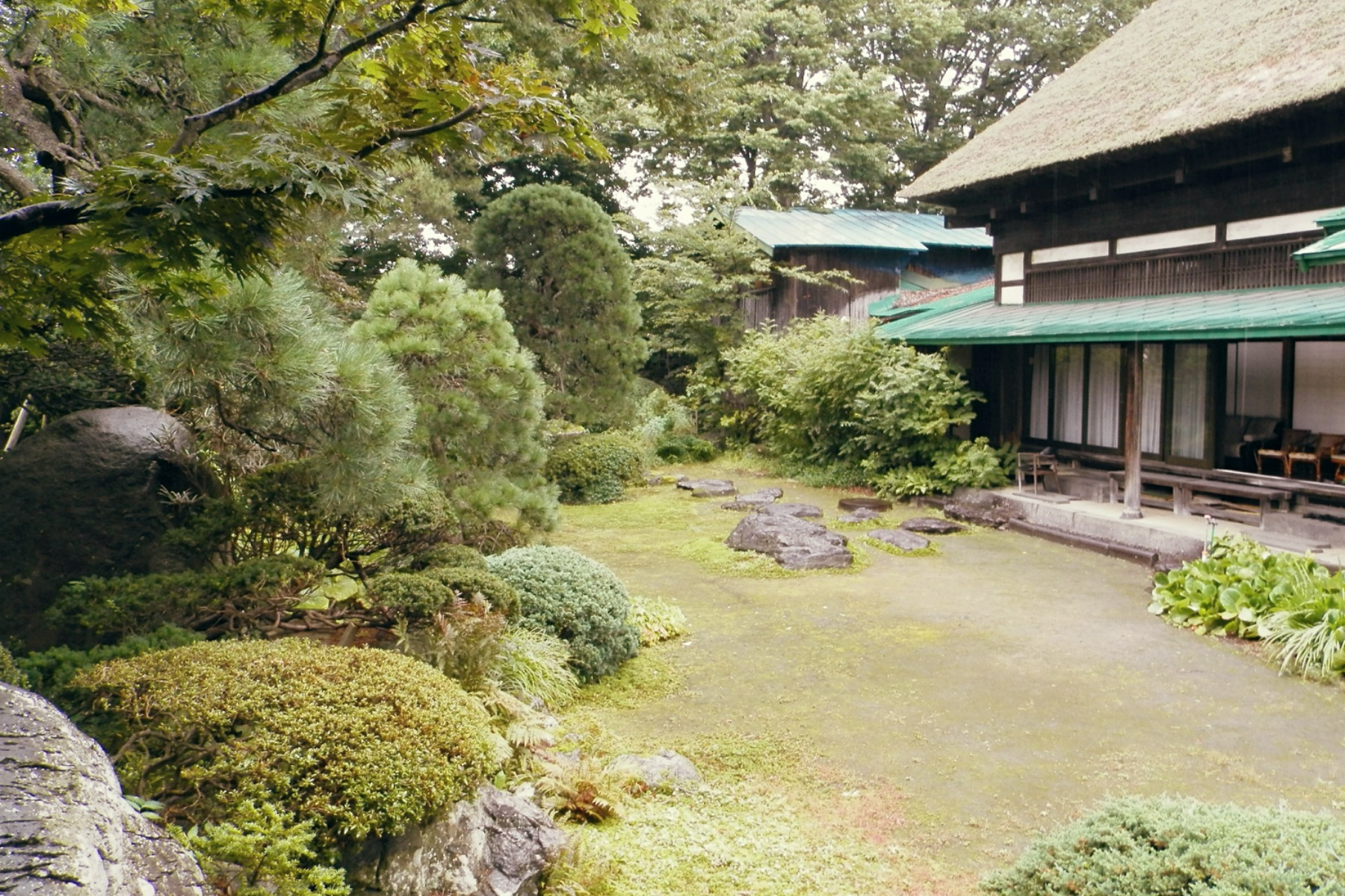
- Seitō Shoin Teien

- Location within Aomori Prefecture Location within Japan
- Type: Urban park
- Location: Hirakawa, Aomori, Japan
- Coordinates: 40°36′57.2″N 140°34′11.4″E
- Area: 2,881.43 square metres (0.71202 acres)
- Created: 1668-1703
- Operator: private
- National Palace of Scenic Beauty

Seitō Shoin Teien (清藤氏書院庭園) is a Japanese dry landscape garden and nationally designated Place of Scenic Beauty in the city of Hirakawa, Aomori Prefecture, Japan.

== Overview ==
The garden was laid out in the Genroku era of the Edo period (1668-1703) at the residence of the Seitō family, to commemorate the visit of a court noble, Fujiwara Tadanaga, to this location to plant a keyaki tree. The Seitō family claimed descent from Seitō Morihide, a retainer of Hōjō Tokiyori in the Kamakura period. According to legend, Hōjō Tokiyori had an affair with a lady-in-waiting named Karaito Gozen. This incurred the wrath of his wife, and fearing for Karaito Gozen's safety, he entrusted her to Seitō Morihide with orders to hide her in a distant location with promises that they would eventually be reunited. Seitō Morihide took her to distant Tsuruga by sea, to a village in what is now Fujisaki, Aomori. However, after years went by, Karaito Gozen feared that Hōjō Tokiyori had a change of heart and she committed suicide by throwing herself in a pond. Unable to face Tokiyori, Seitō Morihide decided to remain in Tsugaru. His descendants became great landholders, and Fujiwara Tadanaga was visiting sites connected with this legend.

The garden covers an area of 2,881.43 square metres (31,015.5 sq ft). The original keyaki tree no longer exists, and the garden was extensively renovated in the late Edo period; however, it can be considered a prototype of the Oishi Bugaku Ryu style of Japanese gardens, as later seen at the nearby Seibi-en.

The garden is approximately a 10 minute walk from Tsugaru-Onoe Station on the Kōnan Railway.

== See also ==
- List of Places of Scenic Beauty of Japan (Aomori)
- Seibi-en
