= Aomori Prefectural Museum =

Museum in Aomori Prefecture, Japan

Coordinates: 40.8273°N 140.7487°E

- 青森県立郷土館
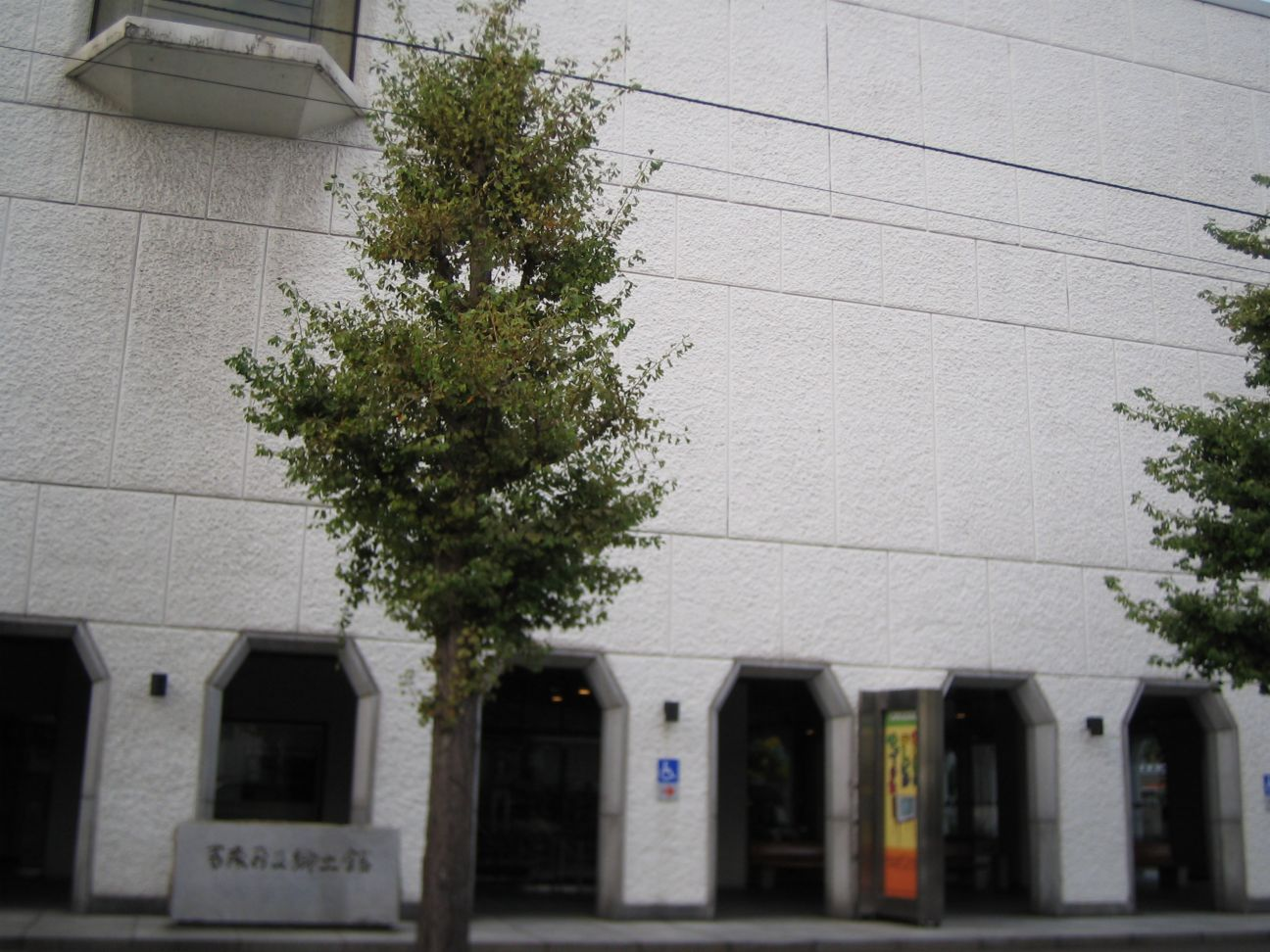
- Location: 8-14 Honchō-nichōme, Aomori, Aomori Prefecture, Japan
- Website: Official website

The Aomori Prefectural Museum (青森県立郷土館, Aomori Kenritsu Kyōdokan) is a museum located in Aomori, Aomori Prefecture, Japan.

The museum has a collection of artifacts from the Jōmon Period, as well as exhibits detailing Aomori's culture and history. The museum opened in 1973.

== See also ==
- List of Important Tangible Folk Cultural Properties
