= Japan National Route 281 =

National highway in Iwate Prefecture, Japan

National Route 281
- 国道281号
- Japan National Route 281 highlighted in red
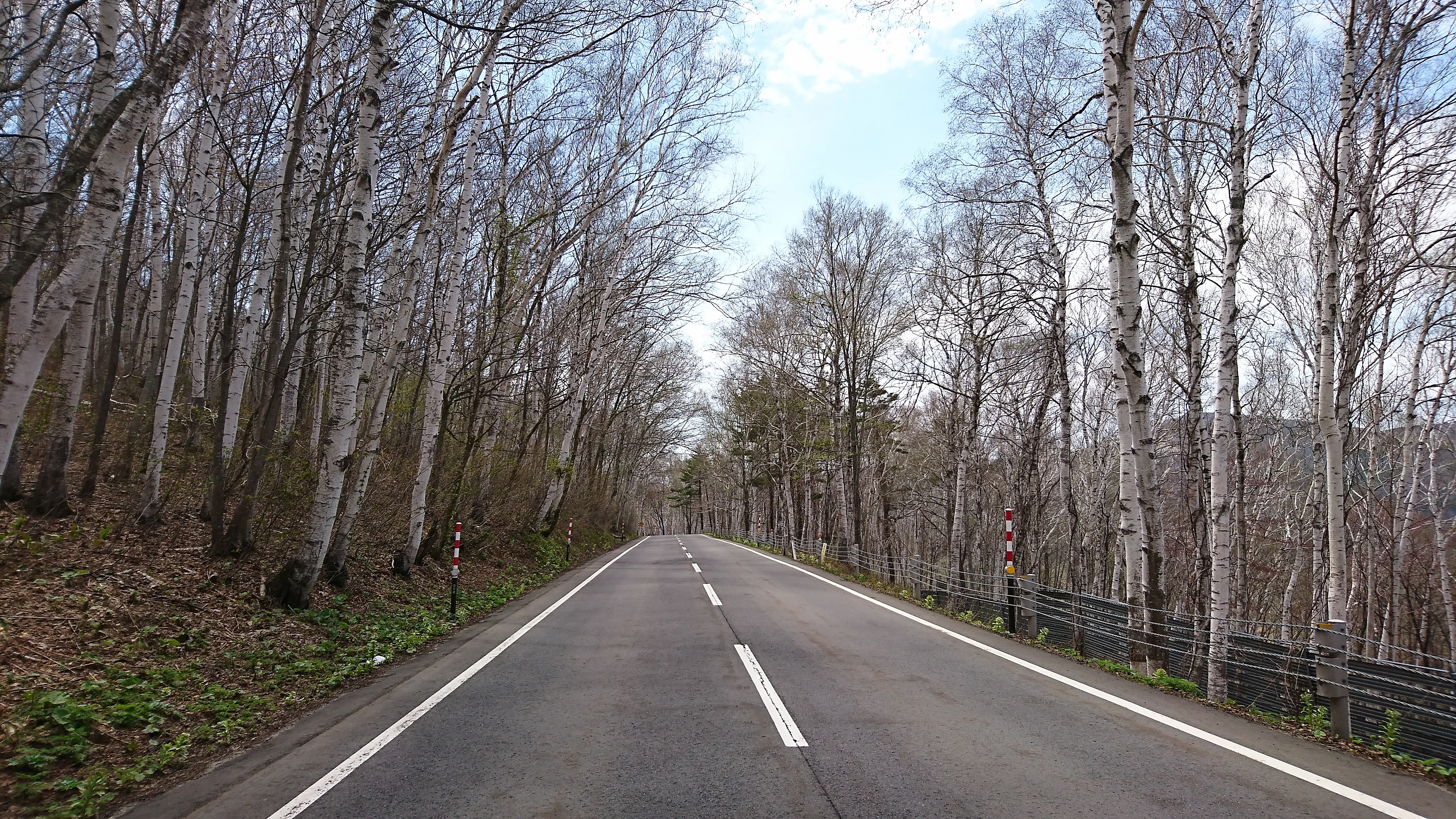

Route information
- Length: 111 km (69 mi)

Major junctions
- West end: National Route 4 / National Route 282 in Morioka
- East end: National Route 45 in Kuji

Location
- Country: Japan

Highway system
- National highways of Japan; Expressways of Japan
← National Route 280	→ National Route 282

National Route 281 (国道281号, Kokudō Nihyaku hachi-juichigō) is a national highway of Japan that traverses the prefecture of Iwate in a southwest–northeast routing. It connects the prefecture's capital city, Morioka to the coastal city of Kuji. It has a total length of 111 kilometers (69 mi).

== Route description ==
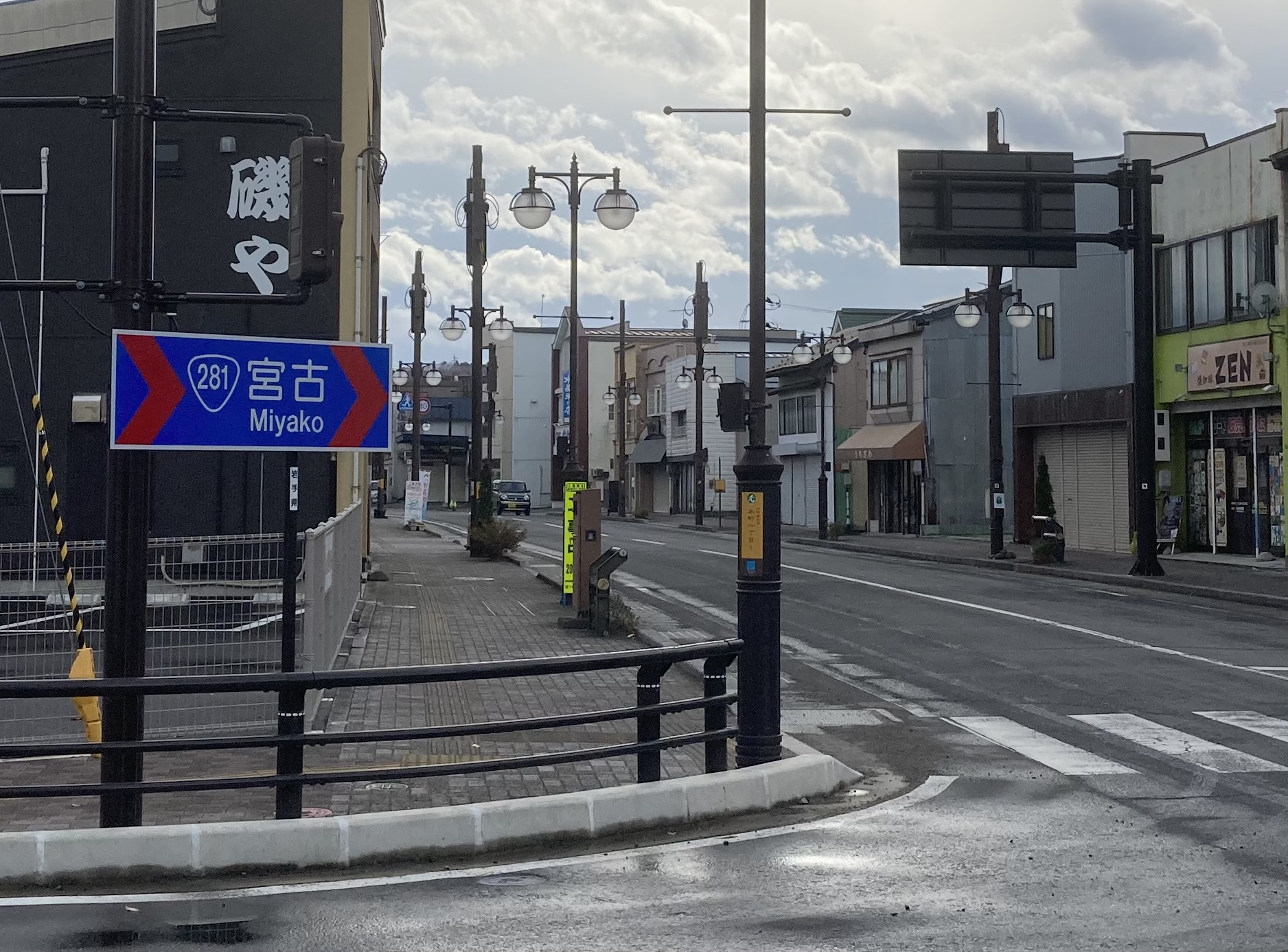
National Route 281 in central Kuji

National Route 281 crosses Iwate Prefecture in a southwest–northeast routing. Beginning at a junction with national routes 4 and 282 in the prefecture's capital city, Morioka, it travels north alongside the two routes out of Morioka. In the city of Takizawa, National Route 282 leaves the concurrency near Takizawa Interchange on the Tōhoku Expressway. The concurrency of national routes 4 and 281 continues northeast, briefly crossing back in to Morioka, before entering the town of Iwate. In Iwate, National Route 281 leaves National Route 4, traveling east across the Kitakami Mountains towards the coastal city of Kuji. In the mountains, it passes through the town of Kuzumaki where it briefly has a concurrency with National Route 340. Upon crossing over the crest of the mountains, the highway enters Kuji. From there, it follows the Kuji River down to the central district of the city. After passing through the central part of Kuji, the highway terminates at a junction with National Route 45. It has a total length of 111 kilometers (69 mi), though only 76.4 kilometers (47.5 mi) of that total distance is routed independently from National Route 4.

== History ==
On 20 January 1954, a section of the Katsumaki–Numakunai route from the then-town of Kuji to the town of Numakunai was designated as a major local road that would later be included into National Route 281. On 16 August of the same year, the Iwate Prefectural Government certified the Kuji–Numakunai Route as a prefectural route. On 1 April 1970, National Route 281 was created when it was designated as General National Route 281 between the cities of Morioka and Kuji.

The highway served as an evacuation route for the city of Kuji following the 2011 Tōhoku earthquake and subsequent tsunami. Following the disaster, a mountainous section of the highway was rebuilt as a part of the region-wide recovery effort to improve the effectiveness of the highway during future evacuations. The straightening project is set to be completed in 2020.

== Major intersections ==
The route lies entirely within Iwate Prefecture.

Location	km	mi	Destinations	Notes
Morioka	0.0	0.0	National Route 4 south / National Route 282 ends – Sendai, Hanamaki, Kitakami	Western terminus; highway continues south as National Route 4
Morioka	1.7	1.1	Iwate Prefecture Route 220 south – Morioka Station, Prefecture Office	
Takizawa	9.1	5.7	National Route 282 north (Ippongi Bypass) – Hachimantai; Iwate Prefecture Route 16 (Morioka Belt Highway) – Koiwai	Eastern end of National Route 282 concurrency
Takizawa	9.8	6.1	Tōhoku Expressway – to Hachinohe Expressway, Sendai, Tokyo, Aomori	E4 exit 43 (Takizawa Interchange)
Morioka	15.8	9.8	Iwate Prefecture Route 169 south – Iwaizumi; Iwate Prefecture Route 301 north – Tamayama Branch Office	
Morioka	21.0	13.0	Iwate Prefecture Route 129 west – Hachimantai	
Iwate	25.2	15.7	Iwate Prefecture Route 157 north – Iwate-Kawaguchi Station	
Iwate	31.8	19.8	Iwate Prefecture Route 17 – Hachimantai, Numakunai	
Iwate	35.1	21.8	National Route 4 north – Towada, Ninohe	Eastern end of National Route 4 concurrency
Iwate	36.8	22.9	Iwate Prefecture Route 17 west – Iwate-Numakunai Station	
Kuzumaki	49.7	30.9	Iwate Prefecture Route 253 west – Kitayamagata	
Kuzumaki	62.1	38.6	Iwate Prefecture Route 30 west	Iwate Prefecture Route 30 is closed to through traffic
Kuzumaki	64.1	39.8	Iwate Prefecture Route 15 north – Ichinohe	
Kuzumaki	68.0	42.3	National Route 340 south – Iwaizumi	Western end of National Route 340 concurrency
Kuzumaki	69.0	42.9	National Route 340 north – Hachinohe, Ninohe	Eastern end of National Route 340 concurrency
Kuji	76.1	47.3	Iwate Prefecture Route 29 east – Noda	
Kuji	82.9	51.5	Iwate Prefecture Route 272 west – Nikarube	
Kuji	89.3	55.5	Iwate Prefecture Route 5 west – Kunohe	
Kuji	97.0	60.3	Iwate Prefecture Route 42 west – to Hachinohe Expressway, Ninohe, Karumai	
Kuji	108.9	67.7	Iwate Prefecture Route 124 east – Kuji Station	
Kuji	109.0	67.7	Iwate Prefecture Route 7 south	
Kuji	111.0	69.0	National Route 45 – Hachinohe, Miyako; Iwate Prefecture Route 268 east – Kosode	Eastern terminus; roadway continues as Iwate Prefecture Route 268
1.000 mi = 1.609 km; 1.000 km = 0.621 mi: Closed/former; Concurrency terminus
