= 701 (disambiguation) =

701 may refer to:

- 701, the year
- 701 series, a Japanese train type
- IBM 701, IBM's first commercial computer
- IBM ThinkPad 701, a subnotebook series by IBM
- 701, a common name for the Yamaha Superjet
- Seven-O-One, or 701, a Canadian information television series (1960–1963)
- Area code 701 for North Dakota, United States
- Class 701 train, a British train type
- March 701, a Formula One racing car

== See also ==
- List of highways numbered 701
