= Oku-nakayama kōgen Station =

Railway station in Ichinohe, Iwate Prefecture, Japan

Oku-nakayama kōgen Station 奥中山高原駅
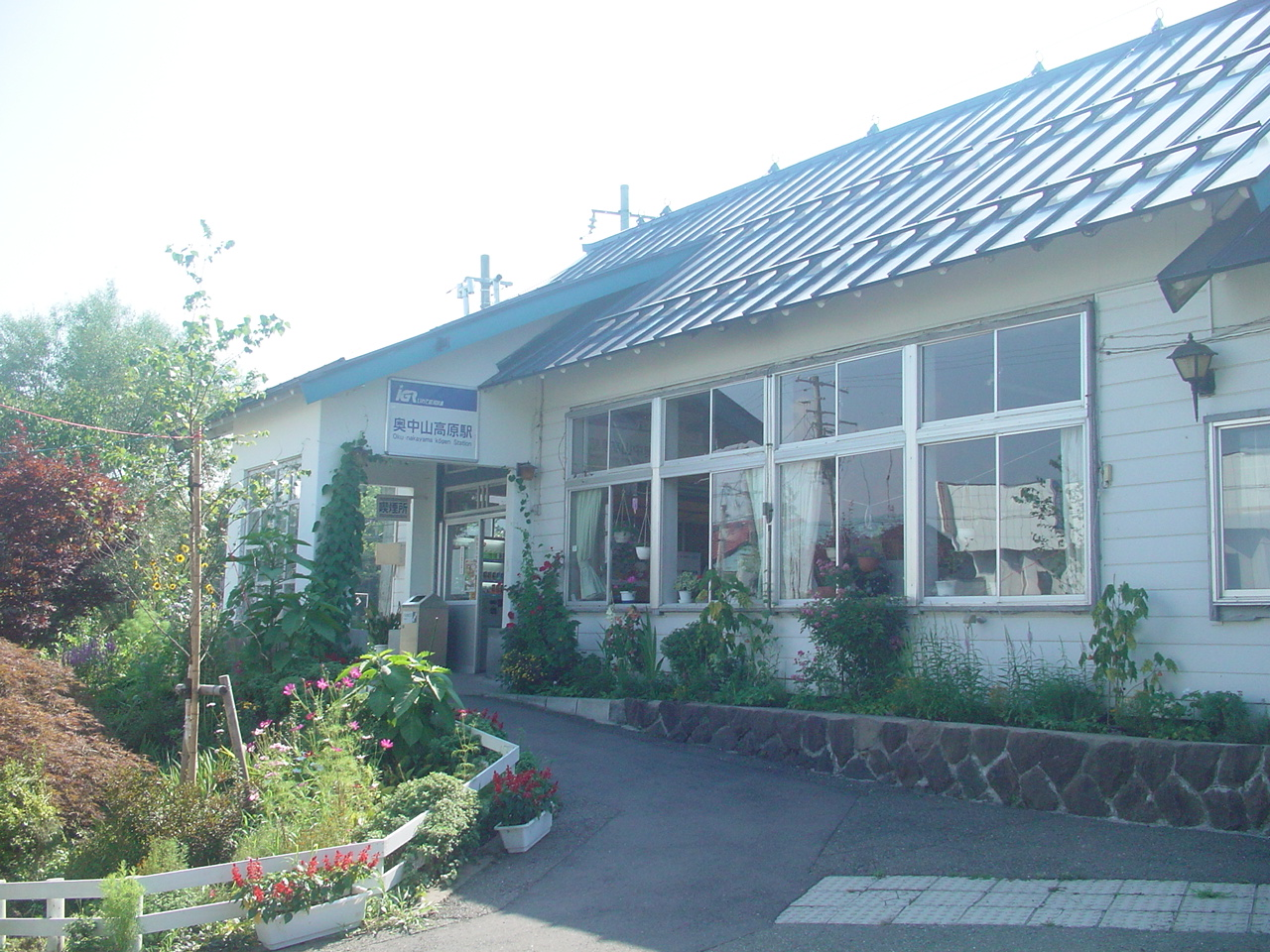
- Oku-nakayama kōgen Station, October 2007

General information
- Location: 76-3 Nakayama Otsuka, Ichinohe-machi, Ninohe-gun, Iwate-ken 028-5133; Japan
- Coordinates: 40°03′58″N 141°13′43″E
- Operator: Iwate Galaxy Railway Company
- Line: ■ Iwate Ginga Railway Line
- Distance: 44.4 km from Morioka
- Platforms: 1 island + 1 side platform
- Tracks: 3

Construction
- Structure type: At grade

Other information
- Status: Staffed
- Website: Official website

History
- Opened: 1 September 1891
- Former names: Nakayama (until 1915); Okunakayama (until 2002)

Passengers
- FY2015: 355 daily
Location
- Location within Japan

Oku-nakayama kōgen Station (奥中山高原駅, Oku-nakayama kōgen-eki) is a railway station on the Iwate Ginga Railway Line in the town of Ichinohe, Iwate Prefecture, Japan operated by the third-sector railway operator Iwate Ginga Railway Company.

== Lines ==
Oku-nakayama kōgen Station is served by the Iwate Ginga Railway Line, and is located 44.4 kilometers from the starting point of the line at Morioka Station and 579.7 kilometers from Tokyo Station.

== Station layout ==
Oku-nakayama kōgen Station has an island platform and a single side platform connected to the station building by a footbridge. The station is staffed.

=== Platforms ===
1	■ Iwate Ginga Railway Line	for Iwate-Numakunai and Morioka
2	■ Iwate Ginga Railway Line	(passing loop)
3	■ Iwate Ginga Railway Line	for Ninohe and Hachinohe

== Adjacent stations ==
«	Service	»
Iwate Ginga Railway Line
Midō	-	Kotsunagi

== History ==
The station opened on 1 September 1891 as Nakayama Station (中山駅). It was renamed Okunakayama Station (奥中山駅) on 11 September 1915. The station was absorbed into the JR East network upon the privatization of Japanese National Railways (JNR) on 1 April 1987 and was transferred to the Iwate Ginga Railway on 1 September 2002. It was renamed Oku-nakayama kōgen Station at the same time.

== Passenger statistics ==
In fiscal 2015, the station was used by an average of 355 passengers daily.

== Surrounding area ==
- Okunakayama Post Office

== Climate ==
Climate data for Oku-nakayama (1991−2020 normals, extremes 1977−present)
Month	Jan	Feb	Mar	Apr	May	Jun	Jul	Aug	Sep	Oct	Nov	Dec	Year
Record high °C (°F)	10.8 (51.4)	11.2 (52.2)	17.9 (64.2)	26.5 (79.7)	31.1 (88.0)	30.8 (87.4)	33.4 (92.1)	33.5 (92.3)	30.9 (87.6)	26.6 (79.9)	19.4 (66.9)	15.1 (59.2)	33.5 (92.3)
Mean daily maximum °C (°F)	−1.0 (30.2)	0.1 (32.2)	4.1 (39.4)	11.8 (53.2)	18.0 (64.4)	21.5 (70.7)	24.5 (76.1)	25.6 (78.1)	21.6 (70.9)	15.4 (59.7)	8.3 (46.9)	1.6 (34.9)	12.6 (54.7)
Daily mean °C (°F)	−4.5 (23.9)	−3.9 (25.0)	−0.3 (31.5)	6.0 (42.8)	12.1 (53.8)	16.1 (61.0)	19.9 (67.8)	20.9 (69.6)	16.7 (62.1)	10.1 (50.2)	3.8 (38.8)	−1.9 (28.6)	7.9 (46.2)
Mean daily minimum °C (°F)	−9.6 (14.7)	−9.2 (15.4)	−5.5 (22.1)	0.3 (32.5)	6.1 (43.0)	11.3 (52.3)	16.2 (61.2)	17.1 (62.8)	12.3 (54.1)	4.9 (40.8)	−1.0 (30.2)	−6.1 (21.0)	3.1 (37.6)
Record low °C (°F)	−20.7 (−5.3)	−21.5 (−6.7)	−20.1 (−4.2)	−13.2 (8.2)	−4.2 (24.4)	−0.2 (31.6)	6.3 (43.3)	6.0 (42.8)	−0.8 (30.6)	−4.5 (23.9)	−13.1 (8.4)	−18.2 (−0.8)	−21.5 (−6.7)
Average precipitation mm (inches)	51.1 (2.01)	44.6 (1.76)	63.2 (2.49)	66.0 (2.60)	83.7 (3.30)	105.2 (4.14)	182.6 (7.19)	179.0 (7.05)	155.4 (6.12)	117.4 (4.62)	84.2 (3.31)	77.0 (3.03)	1,203 (47.36)
Average snowfall cm (inches)	156 (61)	134 (53)	112 (44)	16 (6.3)	0 (0)	0 (0)	0 (0)	0 (0)	0 (0)	0 (0)	24 (9.4)	133 (52)	571 (225)
Average precipitation days (≥ 1.0 mm)	13.1	12.2	12.4	11.1	10.9	10.5	12.6	12.7	12.5	12.6	14.0	14.6	148.0
Average snowy days	18.6	16.0	13.1	2.5	0.0	0.0	0.0	0.0	0.0	0.0	2.9	14.3	67.2
Mean monthly sunshine hours	69.0	83.5	129.4	169.8	189.4	157.1	127.8	142.7	130.1	137.7	106.7	69.9	1,516.2
Source 1: JMA
Source 2: JMA

== See also ==
- List of railway stations in Japan
