= Kotsunagi Station =

Railway station in Ichinohe, Iwate Prefecture, Japan

Kotsunagi Station 小繋駅
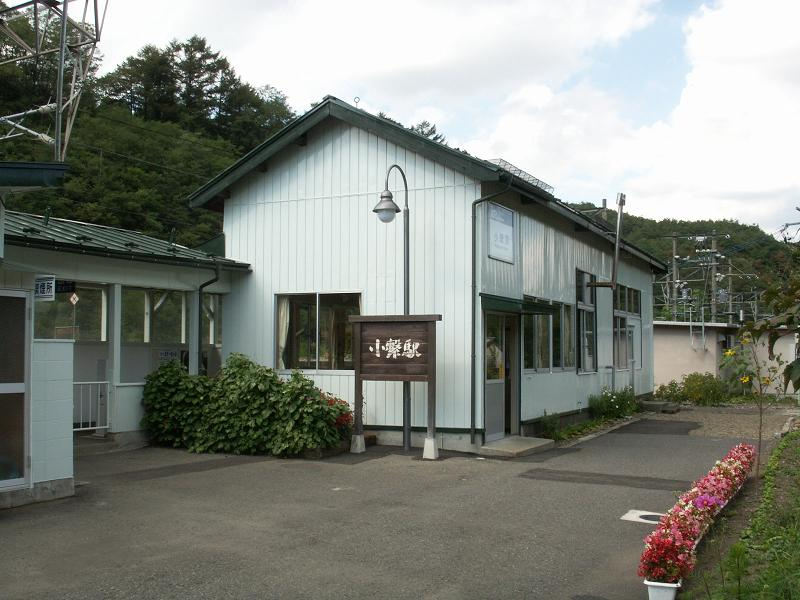
- Kotsunagi Station in September 2006

General information
- Location: 3-2 Kotsunagi Nishidashi, Ichinohe-machi, Ninohe-gun, Iwate-ken 028-5132; Japan
- Coordinates: 40°07′23″N 141°15′38″E
- Operator: Iwate Galaxy Railway Company
- Line: ■ Iwate Ginga Railway Line
- Distance: 52.2 km from Morioka
- Platforms: 2 side platforms
- Tracks: 2

Construction
- Structure type: At grade

Other information
- Status: Staffed
- Website: Official website

History
- Opened: 21 September 1909

Passengers
- FY2015: 16 daily
Location
- Location within Japan

Kotsunagi Station (小繋駅, Kotsunagi-eki) is a railway station on the Iwate Ginga Railway Line in Ichinohe, Iwate Prefecture, Japan, operated by the third-sector railway operator Iwate Ginga Railway Company.

== Lines ==
Kotsunagi Station is served by the Iwate Ginga Railway Line, and is located 52.2 kilometers from the starting point of the line at Morioka Station and 587.5 kilometers from Tokyo Station.

== Station layout ==
Kotsunagi Station has two opposed ground-level side platforms connected to the station building by an overhead crossing. The station is staffed.

=== Platforms ===
1	■ Iwate Ginga Railway Line	for Ninohe and Hachinohe
2	■ Iwate Ginga Railway Line	for Iwate-Numakunai and Morioka

== Adjacent stations ==
«	Service	»
Iwate Ginga Railway Line
Oku-nakayama kōgen	-	Kozuya

== History ==
The station opened on 21 September 1909, on the site of a watering stop for steam locomotives that existed since 31 December 1904. The station was absorbed into the JR East network upon the privatization of Japanese National Railways (JNR) on 1 April 1987, and was transferred to the Iwate Ginga Railway on 1 September 2002.

== Passenger statistics ==
In fiscal 2015, the station was used by an average of 16 passengers daily.

== Surrounding area ==
- National Route 4

== See also ==
- List of railway stations in Japan
