= 707 =

707 may refer to:

- 707 (number), a number
- 707 (band), an American rock band
- AD 707, a year in the 8th century
- 707 BC, a year in the 8th century BC
- The 7 July 2005 London bombings, a terrorist attack
- 707th Special Mission Unit, a military unit in South Korea
- Area code 707, for telephones in northwestern California
- Boeing 707, a passenger airplane
- Avro 707, an experimental airplane
- Roland TR-707, a drum machine
- Submarine 707R, an anime and manga
- 707, a character from the game Mystic Messenger
- British Rail Class 707, an electric multiple unit train built by Siemens
- "Pacific 707", a 1989 record by 808 State
- Jetway 707, a limousine based on the Oldsmobile Toronado

== See also ==
- List of highways numbered 707
