= Ichinohe Station =

Railway station in Ichinohe, Iwate Prefecture, Japan

Ichinohe Station 一戸駅
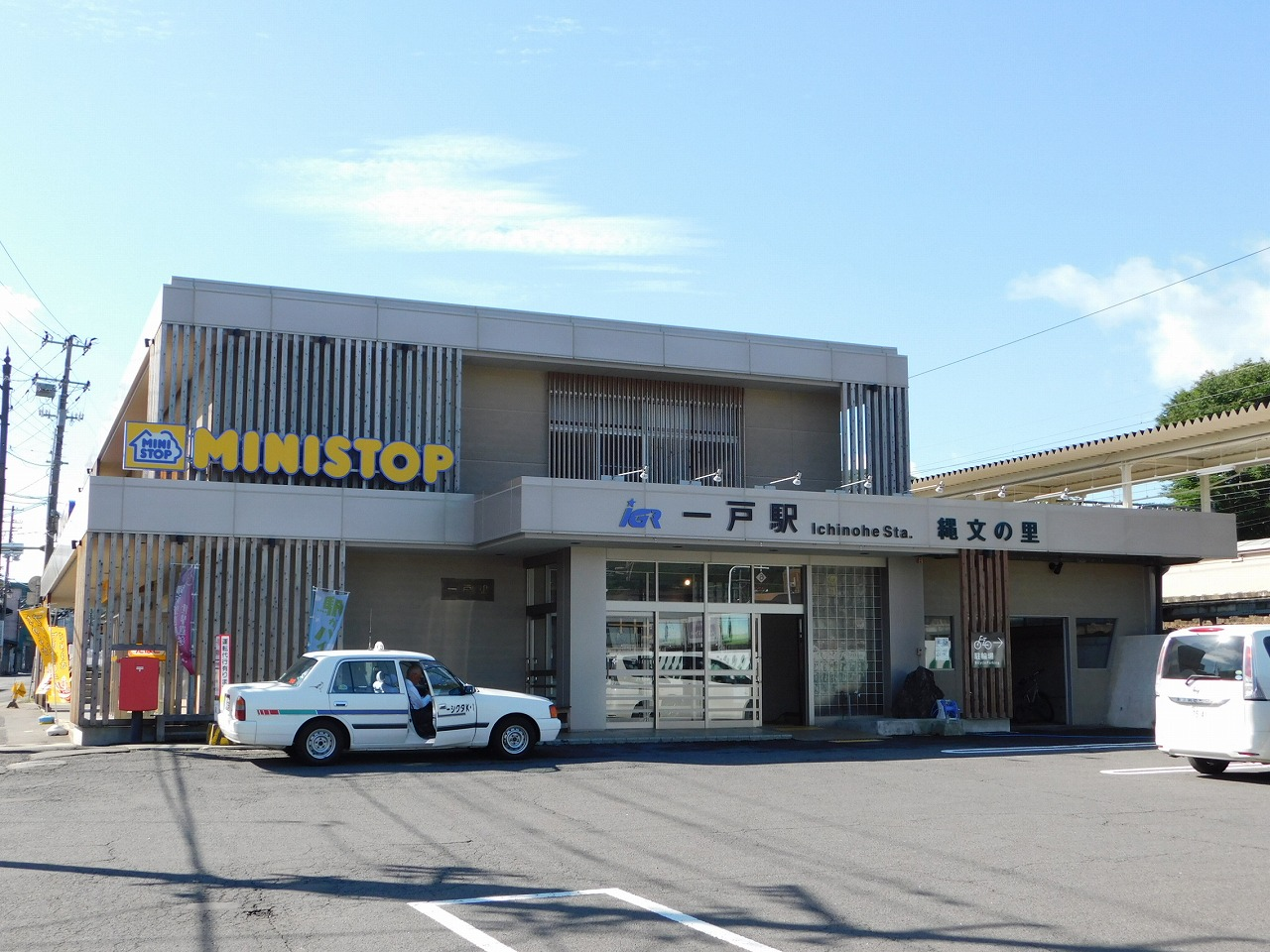
- Ichinohe Station in May 2018

General information
- Location: Saihoji Inari, Ichinohe-machi, Ninohe-gun, Iwate-ken 028-5301; Japan
- Coordinates: 40°12′36″N 141°17′51″E
- Operator: Iwate Galaxy Railway Company
- Line: ■ Iwate Ginga Railway Line
- Distance: 64.5 km from Morioka
- Platforms: 1 island platform
- Tracks: 2

Construction
- Structure type: At grade

Other information
- Status: Staffed
- Website: Official website

History
- Opened: 15 February 1893

Passengers
- FY2015: 587 daily
Location
- Location within Japan

Ichinohe Station (一戸駅, Ichinohe-eki) is a railway station on the Iwate Ginga Railway Line in the town of Ichinohe, Iwate Prefecture, Japan, operated by the third-sector railway operator Iwate Ginga Railway Company.

== Lines ==
Ichinohe Station is served by the Iwate Ginga Railway Line, and is located 64.5 kilometers from the starting point of the line at Morioka Station and 599.8 kilometers from Tokyo Station.

== Station layout ==
Ichinohe Station has a single island platform connected to the station building by an underground passage. The station is staffed.

=== Platforms ===
1	■ Iwate Ginga Railway Line	for Iwate-Numakunai and Morioka
2	■ Iwate Ginga Railway Line	for Ninohe and Hachinohe

== Adjacent stations ==
«	Service	»
Iwate Ginga Railway Line
Kozuya	-	Ninohe

== Route bus ==
- JR Bus Tohoku
  - For Ninohe Station
  - For Kuzumaki via Kozuya
- Nanbu Bus
- Iwate-Kenhoku Bus

== History ==
The station was opened on 15 February 1893, with the name rendered in Japanese as 一ノ戸駅. The kanji characters for the name were changed to 一戸駅 on 1 November 1907. The station was absorbed into the JR East network upon the privatization of Japanese National Railways (JNR) on 1 April 1987, and was transferred to the Iwate Ginga Railway on 1 September 2002.

== Passenger statistics ==
In fiscal 2015, the station was used by an average of 587 passengers daily.

== Surrounding area ==
- Ichinohe Town Hall
- Ichinohe Post Office

== See also ==
- List of railway stations in Japan
