= Midō Station =

Railway station in Iwate, Iwate Prefecture, Japan

Midō Station 御堂駅
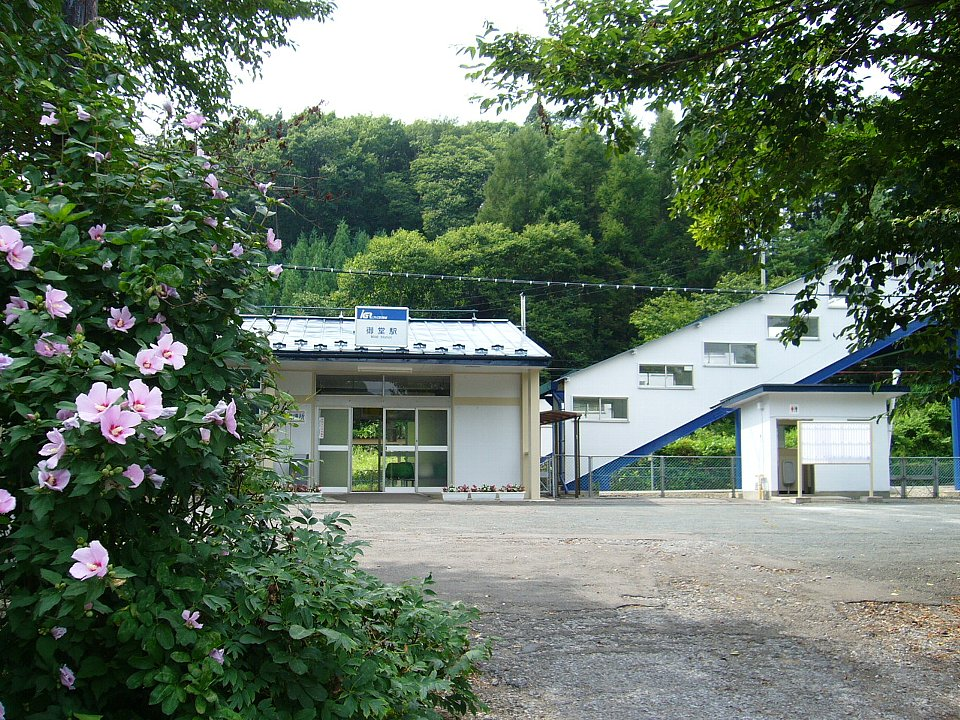
- Midō Station in August 2006

General information
- Location: 4-33 Itsukaichi, Iwate-machi, Iwate-gun, Iwate-ken 028-4307; Japan
- Coordinates: 40°00′16″N 141°14′13″E
- Operator: Iwate Galaxy Railway Company
- Line: ■ Iwate Ginga Railway Line
- Distance: 37.3 km from Morioka
- Platforms: 2 side platforms
- Tracks: 2

Construction
- Structure type: At grade

Other information
- Status: Staffed
- Website: Official website

History
- Opened: 1 November 1918

Passengers
- FY2015: 52 daily
Location
- Location within Japan

Midō Station (御堂駅, Midō-eki) is a railway station on the Iwate Ginga Railway Line in the town of Iwate, Iwate Prefecture, Japan, operated by the Iwate Ginga Railway.

== Lines ==
Midō Station is served by the Iwate Ginga Railway Line, and is located 37.3 kilometers from the terminus of the line at Morioka Station and 572.6 kilometers from Tokyo Station.

== Station layout ==
Midō Station has two opposed side platforms connected to the station building by a footbridge. The station is staffed.

=== Platforms ===
1	■ Iwate Ginga Railway Line	for Iwate-Numakunai and Morioka
2	■ Iwate Ginga Railway Line	for Ninohe and Hachinohe

== Adjacent stations ==
«	Service	»
Iwate Ginga Railway Line
Iwate-Numakunai	-	Okunakayama-Kōgen

== History ==
Midō Station began as a signal stop on 1 November 1918. It was elevated to a full passenger station on 15 April 1961. The station was absorbed into the JR East network upon the privatization of the Japanese National Railways (JNR) on 1 April 1987 and was transferred to the Iwate Ginga Railway on 1 September 2002.

== Passenger statistics ==
In fiscal 2015, the station was used by an average of 52 passengers daily.

== Surrounding area ==
- Japan National Route 4
- Kitakami River
