= Iwate =

Iwate can refer to:

- Iwate Prefecture, a prefecture of Japan
- Iwate, Iwate, a town in Iwate Prefecture, Japan
- Japanese cruiser Iwate, an armored cruiser of the Imperial Japanese Navy from 1900 to the end of World War II
