= Ginga Tetsudō =

Ginga Tetsudō (銀河鉄道) may refer to:

- Night on the Galactic Railroad, a Japanese novel by Kenji Miyazawa, written around 1927
- Galaxy Express 999, a manga written and drawn by Leiji Matsumoto, and the anime based on it
- The Galaxy Railways, a sci-fi anime series produced by Leiji Matsumoto
- Iwate Ginga Railway Line, a railway line running between Iwate and Aomori Prefectures, in Japan
