= Goshono site =

Archaeological type site

Goshono ruins
- 御所野遺跡 (Japanese)
- Reconstructed Jōmon period dwelling at Goshōno

- Goshono ruins Goshono site (Japan)
- 40°11′52.2″N 141°18′22.1″E
- Type: settlement, necropolis
- Periods: Jōmon period
- Location: Ichinohe, Iwate, Japan
- Region: Tōhoku region

History
- Built: 2500 BCE

Site notes
- Height: 190 m (620 ft)
- Area: 75,842 square metres (820,000 sq ft)
- Public access: Yes
- Website: Official website

Goshono ruins (御所野遺跡, Goshono iseki) is a middle Jōmon period archaeological site in the town of Ichinohe, Iwate Prefecture, in the Tōhoku region of northern Japan. Discovered during the construction of an industrial park in 1989, the area was designated a National Historic Site in 1993 by the Japanese government.

== Overview ==
The Goshono ruins consist of a large scale residential settlement from the middle Jōmon Period, approximately 2500 BC to 2000 BC. The site is located on a river terrace on the east bank of the Mabechi River, on raised ground at an altitude of approximately 190 meters, in an area forested with beech, zelkova and chestnut trees. There are the foundations of over 800 pit dwellings extending over 75,000 m^{2} and the site has only partially been excavated.

The settlement contains two or three groups of pit-house dwellings, located to the east and west of a central ceremonial area containing a necropolis and ritual buildings. Nearby earthen mounds have yielded burned animal bones, seeds, pottery shards and stone tools.

The eastern settlement contains more than 250 pit-dwellings of various sizes and a number of graves. The central settlement has two stone circles, with diameters of 80 meters by 50 meters, surrounding grave pits, encircled by what appear to be post holes to create a colonnade and to support ritual buildings. The southern portion of this area is raised earthen work, within which a large amount of pottery, stone tools, and burnt bone and plant remnants. The number of structures is also estimated to be between 300 and 500. The area also contains at least 20 dome-shaped kofun burial tumuli, with diameters of 8–10 meters, most of which have the remnants of horseshoe-shaped moats. The western area is largely unexcavated, but appears to be a residential area with between 70 and 100 dwellings.

The site is now open to the public as an archaeological park which contains a museum and reconstructions of some pit-dwellings and other structures. The museum building, which was designed after the mud-roofed buildings of the site, has won various awards such as the 2003 Good Design Award, and has a glass floor, under which a burnt-down pit dwelling from 4000 years ago can be viewed.

The site is one of several submitted for inscription on the UNESCO World Heritage List as one of the Jōmon Archaeological Sites in Hokkaidō, Northern Tōhoku, and other regions.

The site is located about 20 minutes by car from JR East Ninohe Station.

== See also ==
- List of Historic Sites of Japan (Iwate)
