= 702 (disambiguation) =

702 is a year.

702 may also refer to:

- 702 (number), the number 702
- Area code 702, the area code of Las Vegas, Nevada
- 702 (band), an American R&B band from Las Vegas
- Radio 702, a radio station in Johannesburg, South Africa
- 702 ABC Sydney, the local radio station of the Australian Broadcasting Corporation in Sydney, Australia.
- Section 702 of the FISA in the United States which authorizes warrantless electronic surveillance
- Boeing 702, a communications satellite design.
- IOS version history#iOS 7, the 7.0.2 update to Apple's iOS operating system

== See also ==
- List of highways numbered 702
