= Kozuya Station =

Railway station in Ichinohe, Iwate Prefecture, Japan

Kozuya Station 小鳥谷駅
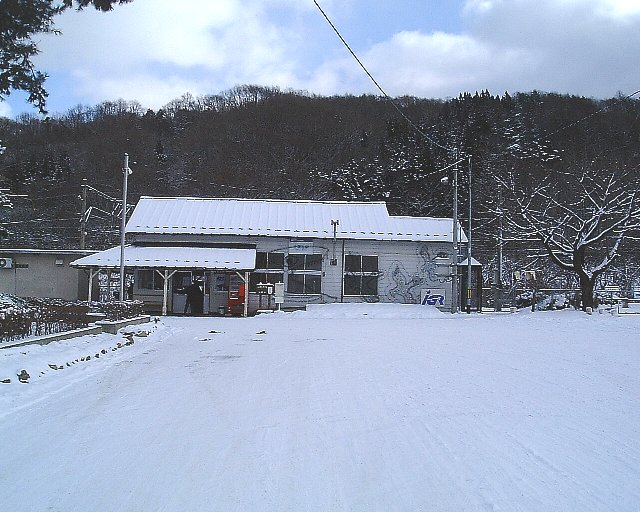
- Kozuya Station in December 2002

General information
- Location: 1 Kozuya Nakayashiki, Ichinohe-machi, Ninohe-gun, Iwate-ken 028-5221; Japan
- Coordinates: 40°10′16″N 141°18′28″E
- Operator: Iwate Galaxy Railway Company
- Line: ■ Iwate Ginga Railway Line
- Distance: 59.8 km from Morioka
- Platforms: 1 island + 1 side platform
- Tracks: 3

Construction
- Structure type: At grade

Other information
- Status: Staffed
- Website: Official website

History
- Opened: 1 September 1891

Passengers
- FY2015: 130 daily
Location
- Location within Japan

Kozuya Station (小鳥谷駅, Kozuya-eki) is a railway station on the Iwate Ginga Railway Line in the town of Ichinohe, Iwate Prefecture, Japan, operated by the third-sector railway operator Iwate Ginga Railway Company.

== Lines ==
Kozuya Station is served by the Iwate Ginga Railway Line, and is located 59.8 kilometers from the starting point of the line at Morioka Station and 595.1 kilometers from Tokyo Station.

== Station layout ==
Kozuya Station has one island platform and a single side platform connected to the station building by a footbridge. The station is staffed.

=== Platforms ===
1-2	■ Iwate Ginga Railway Line	for Ninohe and Hachinohe
3	■ Iwate Ginga Railway Line	for Iwate-Numakunai and Morioka

== Adjacent stations ==
«	Service	»
Iwate Ginga Railway Line
Kotsunagi	-	Ichinohe

== History ==
Kozuya Station opened on 1 September 1891. The station was absorbed into the JR East network upon the privatization of Japanese National Railways (JNR) on 1 April 1987, and was transferred to the Iwate Ginga Railway on 1 September 2002.

== Passenger statistics ==
In fiscal 2015, the station was used by an average of 130 passengers daily.

== Surrounding area ==
- Kozuya Post Office
- Mabechi River
- Kozuya Elementary School

== See also ==
- List of railway stations in Japan
