= List of highways numbered 705 =

Route 705, or Highway 705, may refer to:

== Canada ==
- New Brunswick Route 705
- Saskatchewan Highway 705

== Costa Rica ==
- National Route 705

== India ==
- National Highway 705

== United Kingdom ==
- A705 road (Great Britain)

== United States ==
- Interstate 705
- Florida State Road 705
- Georgia State Route 705 (former)
- Kentucky Route 705
- Louisiana Highway 705
- Maryland Route 705
- Nevada State Route 705
- County Route 705 (Camden County, New Jersey)
  - County Route 705 (Cumberland County, New Jersey)
  - County Route 705 (Gloucester County, New Jersey)
  - County Route 705 (Hudson County, New Jersey)
  - County Route 705 (Passaic County, New Jersey)
- North Carolina Highway 705
- Ohio State Route 705
- Farm to Market Road 705
- Virginia State Route 705
- West Virginia Route 705

Territories

- Puerto Rico Highway 705

| Preceded by 704 | Lists of highways 705 | Succeeded by 706 |
