= Iwate-Kawaguchi Station =

Railway station in Iwate, Iwate Prefecture, Japan

Iwate-Kawaguchi Station 岩手川口駅
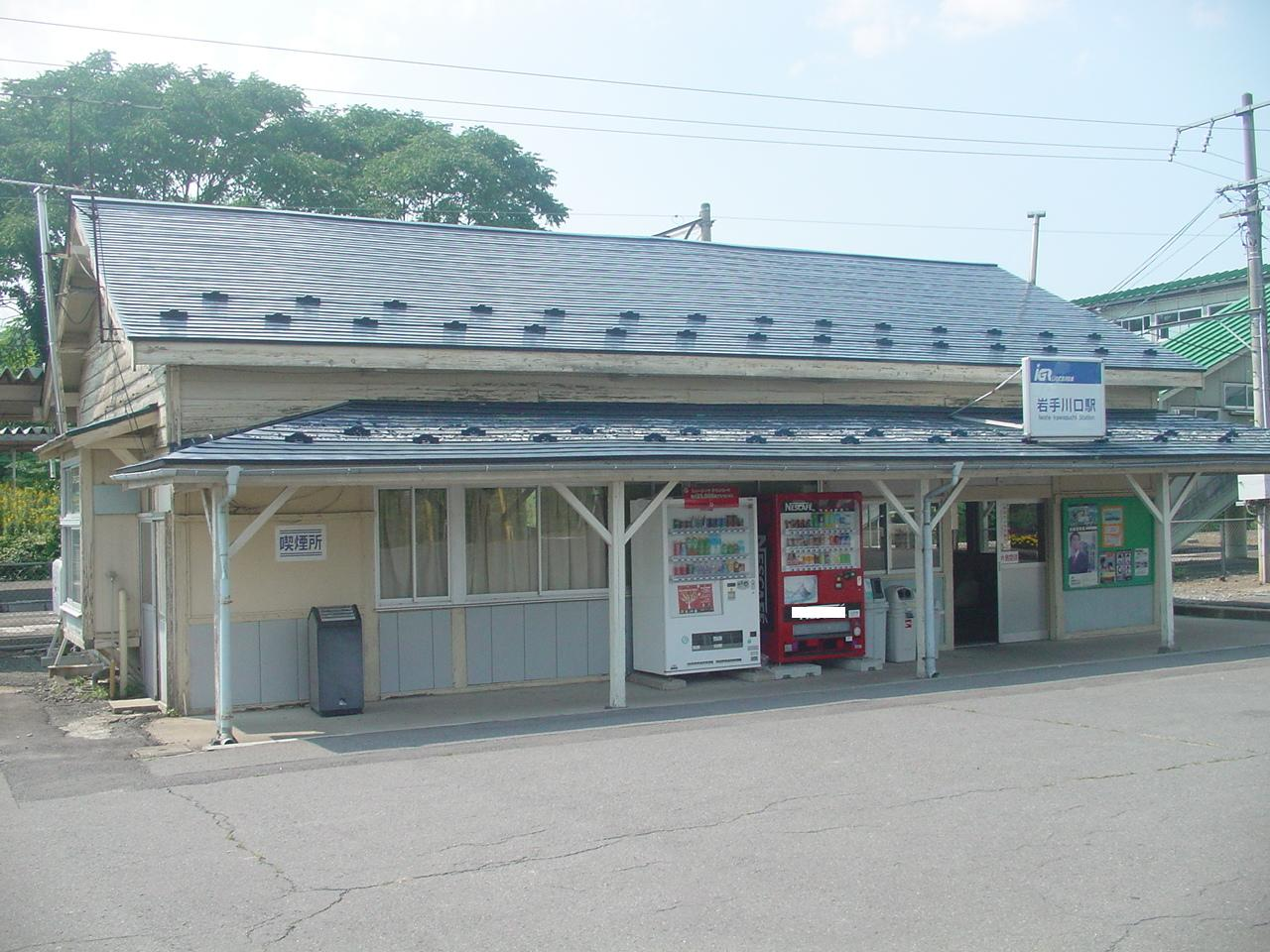
- Iwate-Kawaguchi Station in August 2007

General information
- Location: Kawaguchi dai-9 jiwari 68-1, Iwate-machi, Iwate-gun, Iwate-ken 028-4211; Japan
- Coordinates: 39°55′09″N 141°11′58″E
- Operator: Iwate Galaxy Railway Company
- Line: ■ Iwate Ginga Railway Line
- Distance: 26.9 km from Morioka
- Platforms: 1 island +1 side platform
- Tracks: 3

Construction
- Structure type: At grade

Other information
- Status: Staffed
- Website: Official website

History
- Opened: 11 January 1898
- Former names: Kawaguchi Station (to 1934)

Passengers
- FY2015: 296 daily
Location
- Location within Japan

Iwate-Kawaguchi Station (岩手川口駅, Iwate-Kawaguchi-eki) is a railway station on the Iwate Ginga Railway Line in the town of Iwate, Iwate Prefecture, Japan, operated by the Iwate Ginga Railway.

== Lines ==
Iwate-Kawaguchi Station is served by the Iwate Ginga Railway Line, and is located 26.9 kilometers from the terminus of the line at Morioka Station and 562.2 kilometers from Tokyo Station.

== Station layout ==
Iwate-Kawaguchi Station has an island platform and a single side platform connected to the station building by a footbridge. The station is staffed.

=== Platforms ===
1	■ Iwate Ginga Railway Line	for Iwate-Numakunai, Ninohe and Hachinohe
2	■ Iwate Ginga Railway Line	(passing loop)
3	■ Iwate Ginga Railway Line	for Kōma and Morioka

== Adjacent stations ==
«	Service	»
Iwate Ginga Railway Line
Kōma	-	Iwate-Numakunai

== History ==
Iwate-Kawaguchi Station was opened as Kawagichi Station (川口駅, Kawaguchi-eki) on 11 January 1898. It was renamed to its present name on 1 February 1934. The station was absorbed into the JR East network upon the privatization of the Japanese National Railways (JNR) on 1 April 1987 and was transferred to the Iwate Ginga Railway on 1 September 2002.

== Passenger statistics ==
In fiscal 2015, the station was used by an average of 296 passengers daily.

== Surrounding area ==
- Kawaguchi Post Office
- Kawaguchi Elementary School
- Kawaguchi Middle School
