= List of highways numbered 704 =

The following highways are numbered 704:

== Canada ==
- Highway 704

== Costa Rica ==
- National Route 704

== United States ==
- SR 704
- MD 704
- NC 704
- PR-704
- FM 704
- SR 704

Preceded by 703	Lists of highways 704	Succeeded by 705
