= 701 series =

Japanese train type

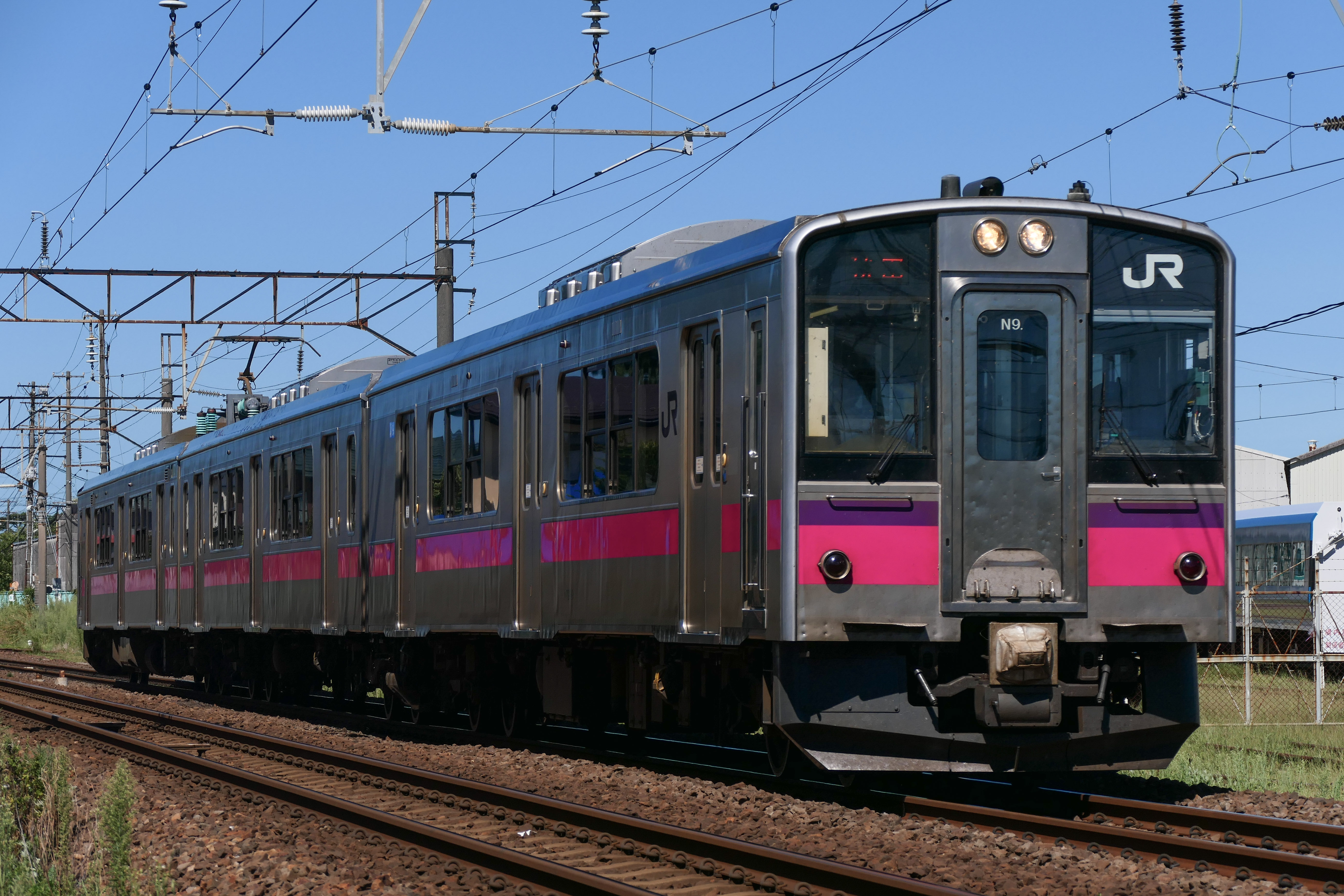
- An Akita area 701-0 series in September 2020
- In service: 1993–present
- Manufacturers: JR East, Kawasaki Heavy Industries
- Replaced: JNR 50 series, 715 series
- Constructed: 1993–2001
- Entered service: 21 June 1993
- Number built: 274 cars
- Number in service: 274 cars
- Formation: 2, 3 or 4 cars per trainset
- Operators: JR East, Aoimori Railway Company, Iwate Galaxy Railway Company
- Depots: Akita, Aomori, Morioka, Sendai, Yamagata

Specifications
- Car body construction: Stainless steel
- Car length: 20 m (65 ft 7 in)
- Width: 2.8 m (9 ft 2 in)
- Height: 3.62 m (11 ft 11 in)
- Doors: 3 pairs per side
- Maximum speed: 110 km/h (68 mph)
- Traction system: Variable frequency (Power transistor, IGBT)
- Electric system: Overhead line, 20 kV 50 Hz AC
- Current collection: Pantograph
- Safety systems: ATS-Ps (-0/100/1000/1500); ATS-P (-5000/5500)
- Multiple working: E721 series
- Track gauge: 1,067 mm (3 ft 6 in) (-0/100/1000/1500); 1,435 mm (4 ft 8 1/2 in) (-5000/5500)

The 701 series (701系, 701-kei) is an AC electric multiple unit (EMU) train type operated on local services by East Japan Railway Company (JR East), Aoimori Railway, and Iwate Galaxy Railway (IGR) in Japan. The design is derived from the 209 series commuter EMU, and was intended to replace locomotive-hauled trains formed of JNR 50 series coaches in the north of Japan.

== Variants ==
- 701-0 series: 2/3-car narrow-gauge sets based at Akita Depot
- 701-100 series: 2/3-car narrow-gauge sets based at Akita and Sendai Depot
- 701-1000 series: 2/4-car narrow-gauge sets based at Morioka and Sendai Depot
- 701-1500 series: 2-car narrow-gauge sets based at Sendai Depot
- 701-5000 series: 2-car standard-gauge sets based at Akita Depot
- 701-5500 series: 2-car standard-gauge sets based at Yamagata Depot
- Aoimori 701 series: 2-car narrow-gauge sets operated by the Aoimori Railway
- IGR 7000 series: 2-car narrow-gauge sets operated by the Iwate Galaxy Railway

== 701-0 series ==
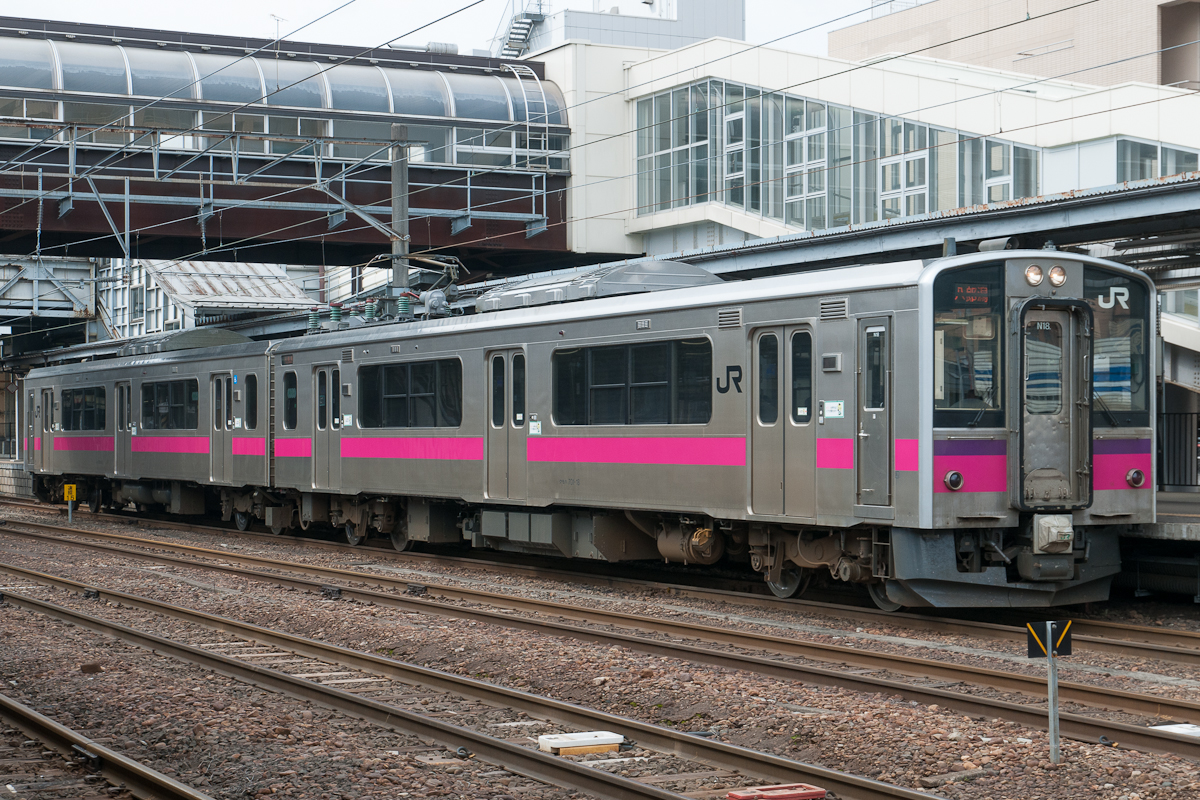
Akita-based 701-0 series 2-car set N18 in April 2012

89 701-0 series cars were delivered in 1993, formed as three-car sets (N1 to N13) and two-car sets (N14 to N38), all based at Akita Depot. Three two-car sets (N36 to N38) were later modified with some transverse seating, and from 2005, the entire fleet had the original PS104 scissors-type pantographs replaced with PS109 single-arm pantographs. Snowploughs were also added to the front ends at the same time.

These sets are used on the Uetsu Main Line between Tsuruoka and Akita, on the Ōu Main Line between Shinjō and Aomori, and on the Tsugaru Line between Aomori and Kanita. The sets with transverse seating are mainly used on the Ōu Main Line between Shinjō and Akita.

=== Formations ===
==== 3-car sets N1-N13 ====
Designation	Mc	T	Tc'
Numbering	KuMoHa 701	SaHa 701	KuHa 700

The KuMoHa 701 car is fitted with one pantograph. The KuHa 700 car is fitted with a toilet and wheelchair space.

==== 2-car sets N14-N38 ====
Designation	Mc	Tc'
Numbering	KuMoHa 701	KuHa 700

The KuMoHa 701 car is fitted with one pantograph. The KuHa 700 car is fitted with a toilet and wheelchair space.

=== Interior ===
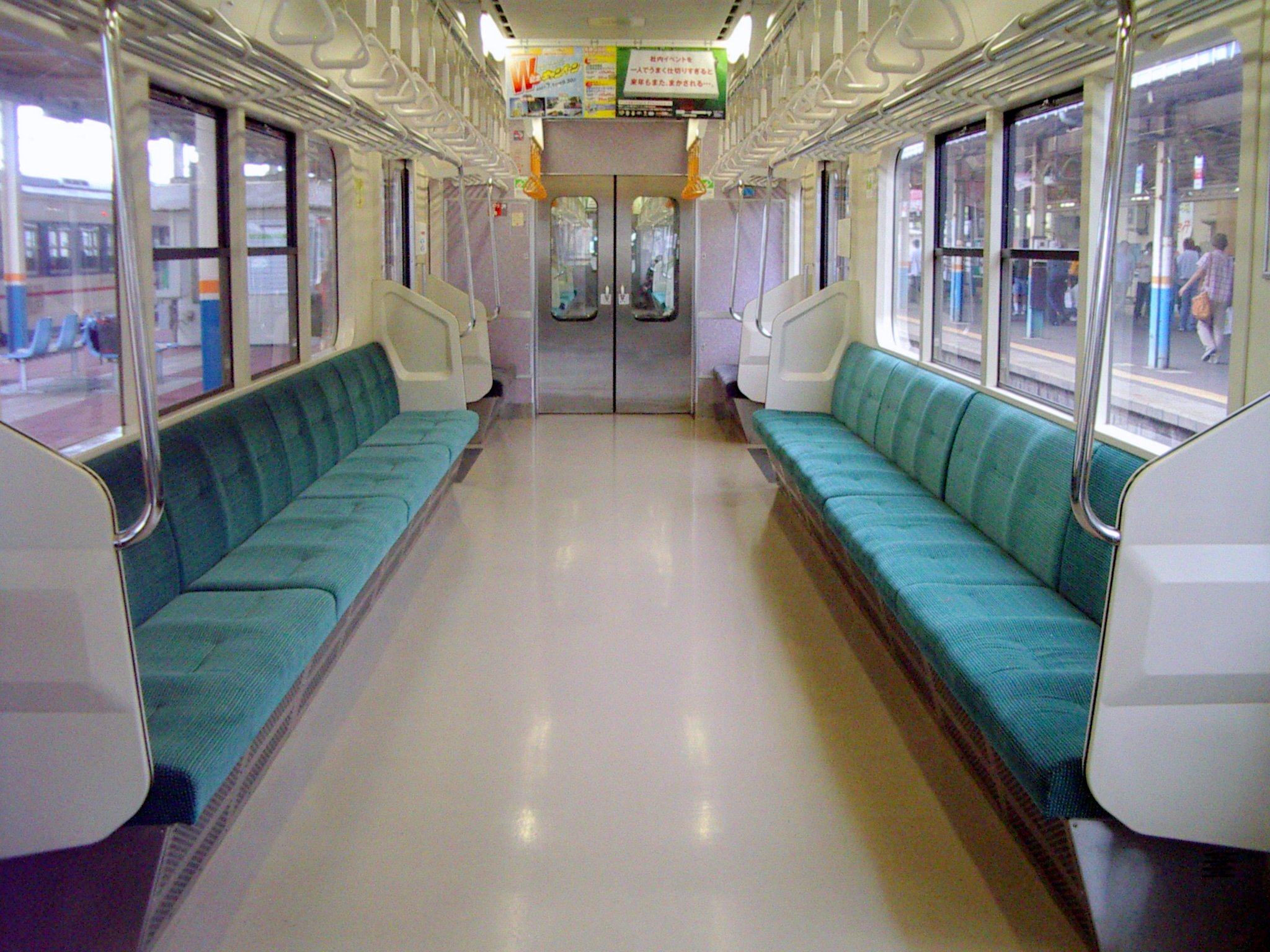
Interior view of Akita set N1 in July 2007, showing longitudinal seating

== 701-100 series ==
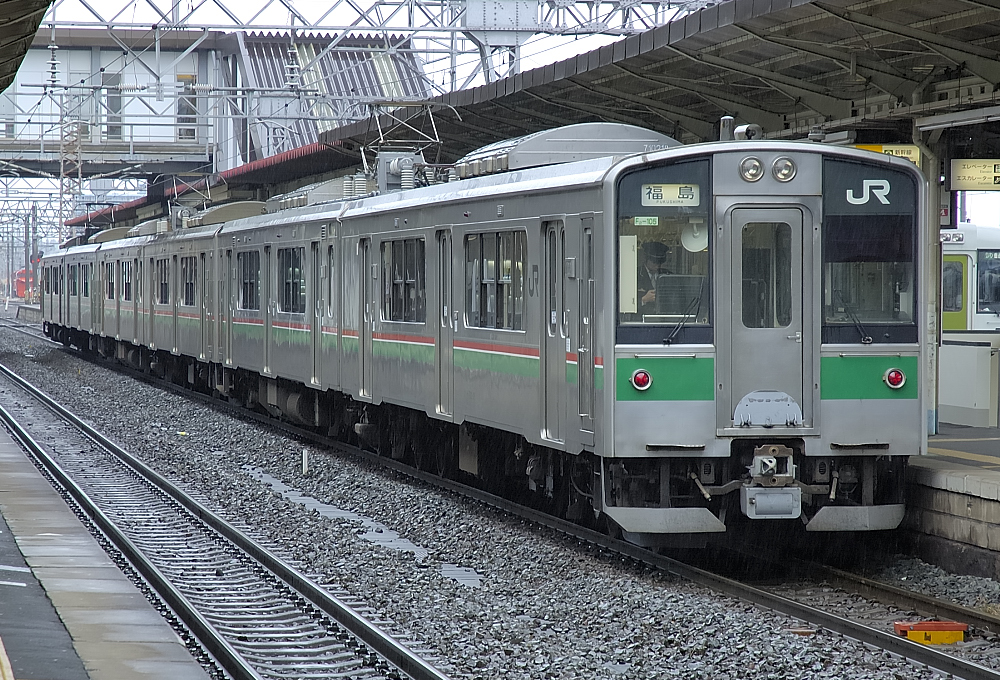
Sendai-based 701-100 series set at Koriyama Station in March 2007

Thirteen 701-100 series cars were delivered in 1994, formed as one 3-car set and five 2-car sets. All sets were initially based at Akita Depot, but four of the 2-car sets were subsequently transferred to Sendai. The Akita-based sets had the original PS104 scissors-type pantographs replaced with PS109 single-arm pantographs between 2007 and 2008. Snowploughs were also added to the front ends at the same time. The Sendai-based sets had the original PS104 scissors-type pantographs replaced with lower-profile PS105 lozenge-type pantographs in 2002 to allow operation through limited-clearance tunnels on the Senzan Line.

The Sendai-based sets are normally used on the Joban Line between Iwaki and Iwanuma, and on the Tohoku Main Line between Iwanuma and Sendai. They are also available for use on Senzan Line services if required. The Akita-based sets are used interchangeably alongside the 701-0 series sets.

=== Formations ===
==== 3-car set N101 ====
Designation	Mc	T	Tc'
Numbering	KuMoHa 701-100	SaHa 701-100	KuHa 700-100

The KuMoHa 701 car is fitted with one pantograph. The KuHa 700 car is fitted with a toilet and wheelchair space.

==== 2-car sets N102 and F2-103–106 ====
Designation	Mc	Tc'
Numbering	KuMoHa 701-100	KuHa 700-100

The KuMoHa 701 car is fitted with one pantograph. The KuHa 700 car is fitted with a toilet and wheelchair space.

== 701-1000 series ==
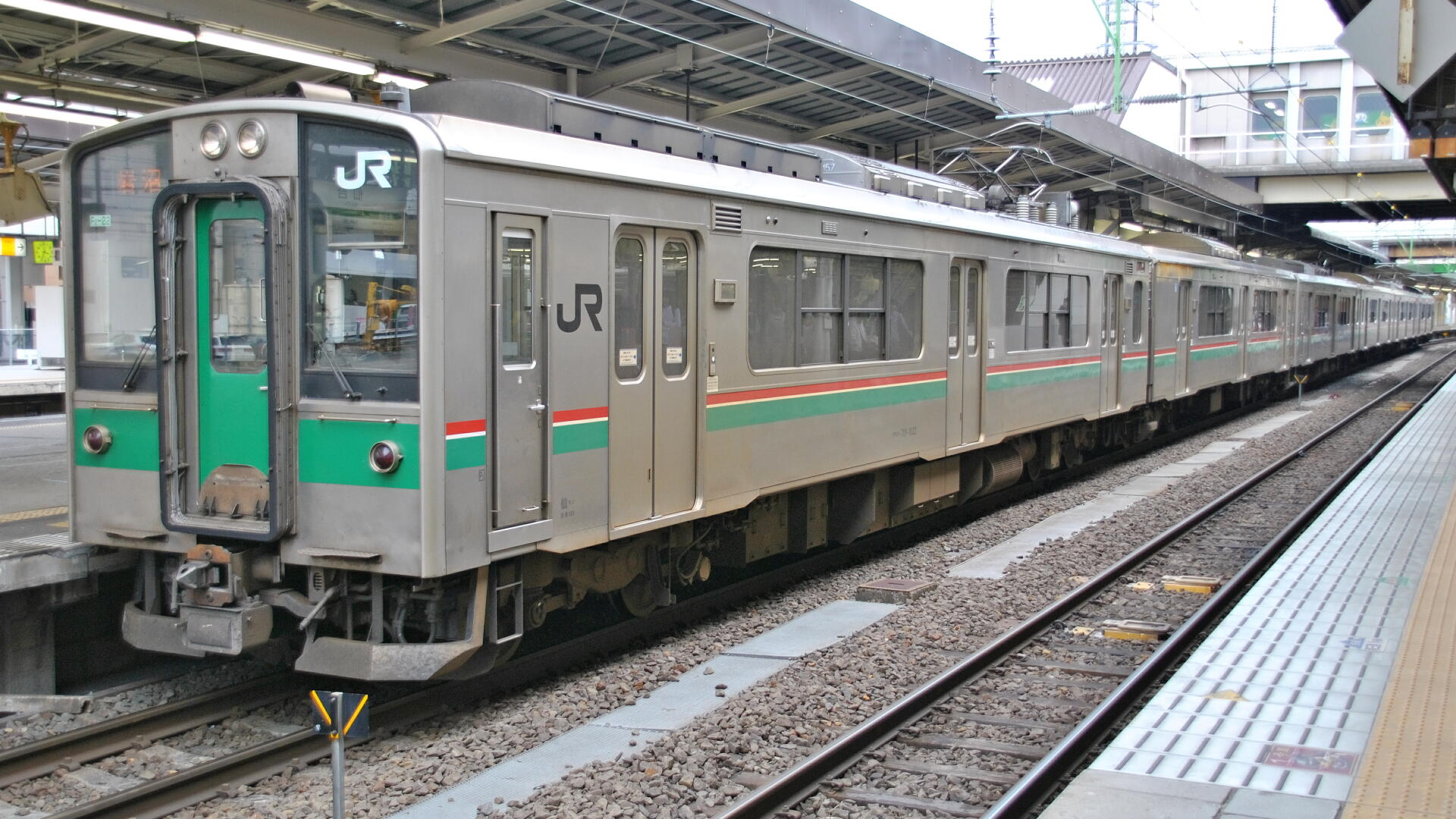
Sendai-based 701-1000 series set in May 2010

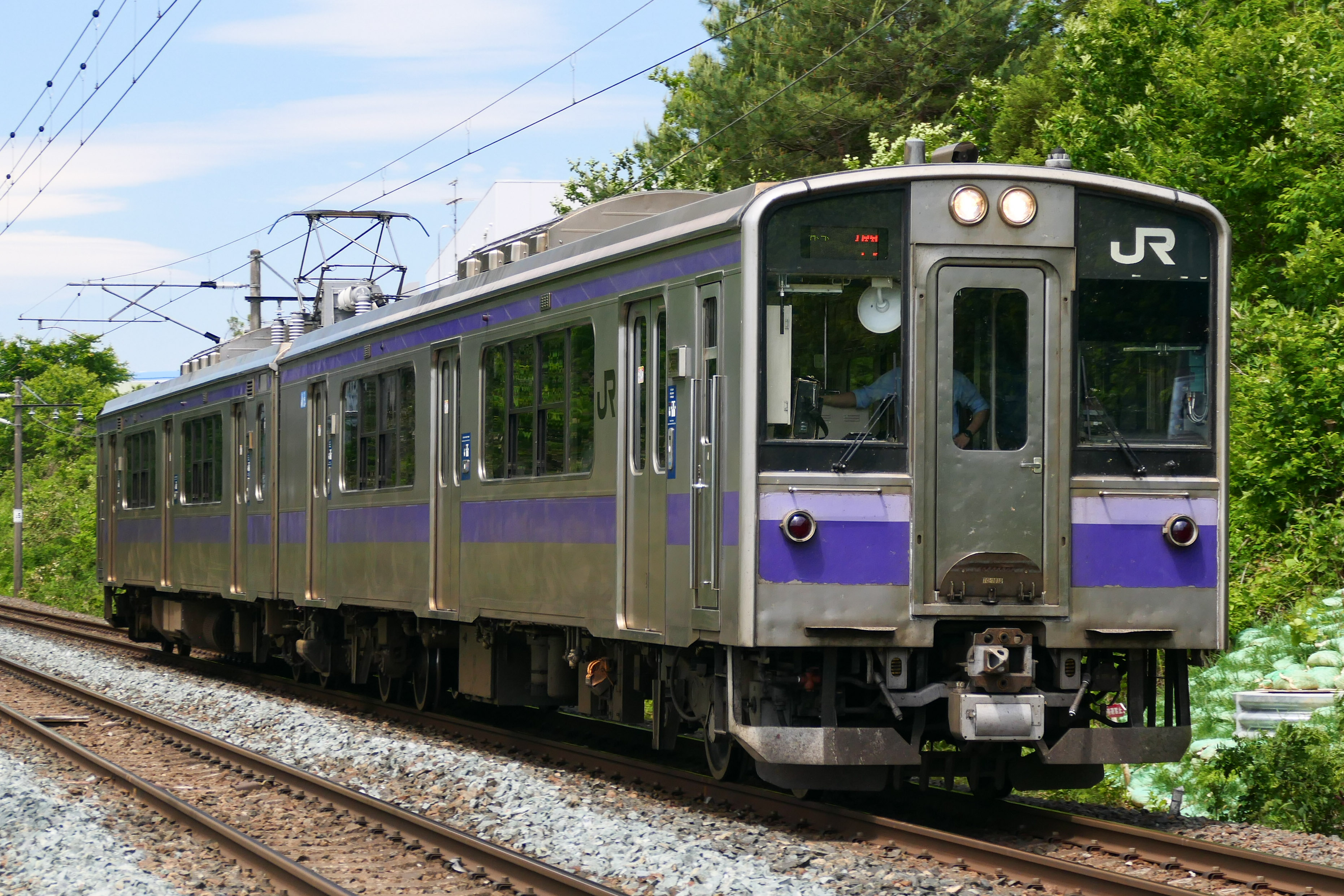
Morioka-based 701‑1000 series set in May 2024

92 701-1000 series cars were delivered between 1994 and 1995 to Morioka and Sendai depots, formed as 2- and 4-car units. As of 2010, 14 cars (seven 2-car sets), 30 cars (fifteen 2-car sets) are based at Morioka, and 36 cars (four 4-car sets and ten 2-car sets) are based at Sendai. Eight of the original 2-car sets were transferred to the Iwate Galaxy Railway Line, becoming IGR 7000-0 series (see below), and one 2-car set was transferred to the Aoimori Railway, becoming Aoimori 700-0 series (see below). On 28 October 1999, one Aomori-based 2-car set (KuMoHa 701-1033 + KuHa 700-1033) was damaged by storm surge at Aomori Station. New bodies were manufactured for this set in 2000, and it was renumbered KuMoHa 701-1508 + KuHa 700-1508 and reallocated to Sendai depot.

A further seven 701-1000 series two-car sets were transferred to the Aoimori Railway during 2010, becoming Aoimori 700-0 series.

The Sendai-based sets are used on the Tohoku Main Line between Kuroiso and Ichinoseki, including the branch line to Rifu, and on the Senzan Line. The Morioka-based sets are used on the Tohoku Main Line between Ichinoseki and Morioka, and on the Iwate Galaxy Railway Line between Morioka and Iwate-Numakunai. The Aomori-based sets are used on the Tohoku Main Line between Hachinohe and Aomori.

=== Formations ===
==== 4-car sets ====
Designation	Mc	T'	M	Tc'
Numbering	KuMoHa 701-1000	SaHa 700-1000	MoHa 701-1000	KuHa 700-100

The KuMoHa 701 and MoHa 701 cars are each fitted with one PS105 lozenge-type pantograph. The KuHa 700 car is fitted with a toilet and wheelchair space.

==== 2-car sets ====
Designation	Mc	Tc'
Numbering	KuMoHa 701-1000	KuHa 700-1000

The KuMoHa 701 car is fitted with one PS105 lozenge-type pantograph. The KuHa 700 car is fitted with a toilet and wheelchair space.

== 701-1500 series ==
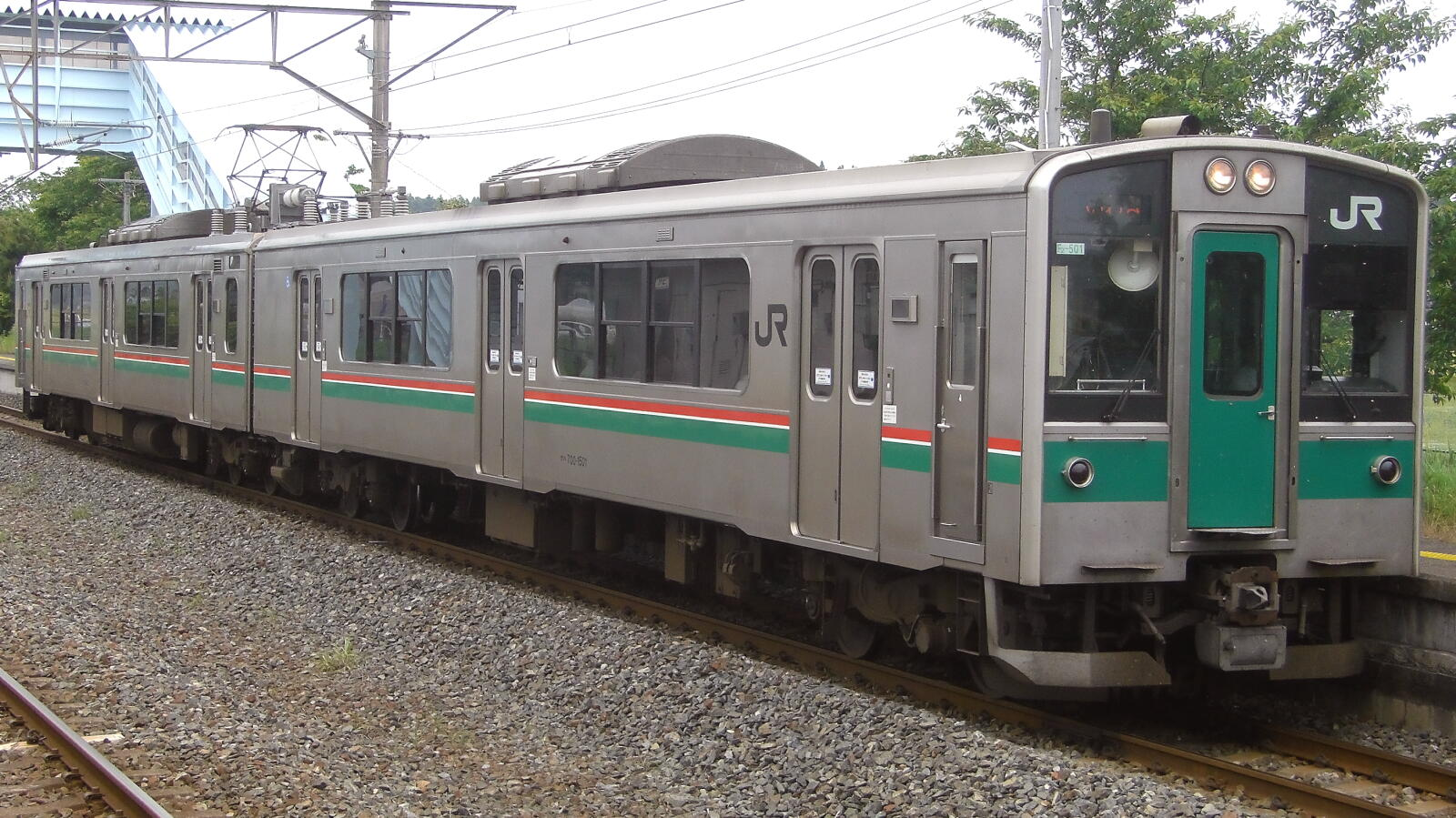
Sendai area 701-1500 series at Iwaki-Ōta Station in June 2008

Eighteen two-car sets (numbered F2-501 to F2-518) were delivered to Sendai depot between 1998 and 2001, including set F2-508, which was rebuilt from an earlier damaged 701-1000 series unit. Sets from F2-509 onward were fitted with wheelchair spaces and ATS-Ps from new. They are used interchangeably with Sendai 701-1000 series sets.

=== Formation ===
Designation	Mc	Tc'
Numbering	KuMoHa 701-1500	KuHa 700-1500

The KuMoHa 701 car is fitted with one PS105 lozenge-type pantograph. The KuHa 700 car is fitted with a toilet and wheelchair space.

== 701-5000 series ==
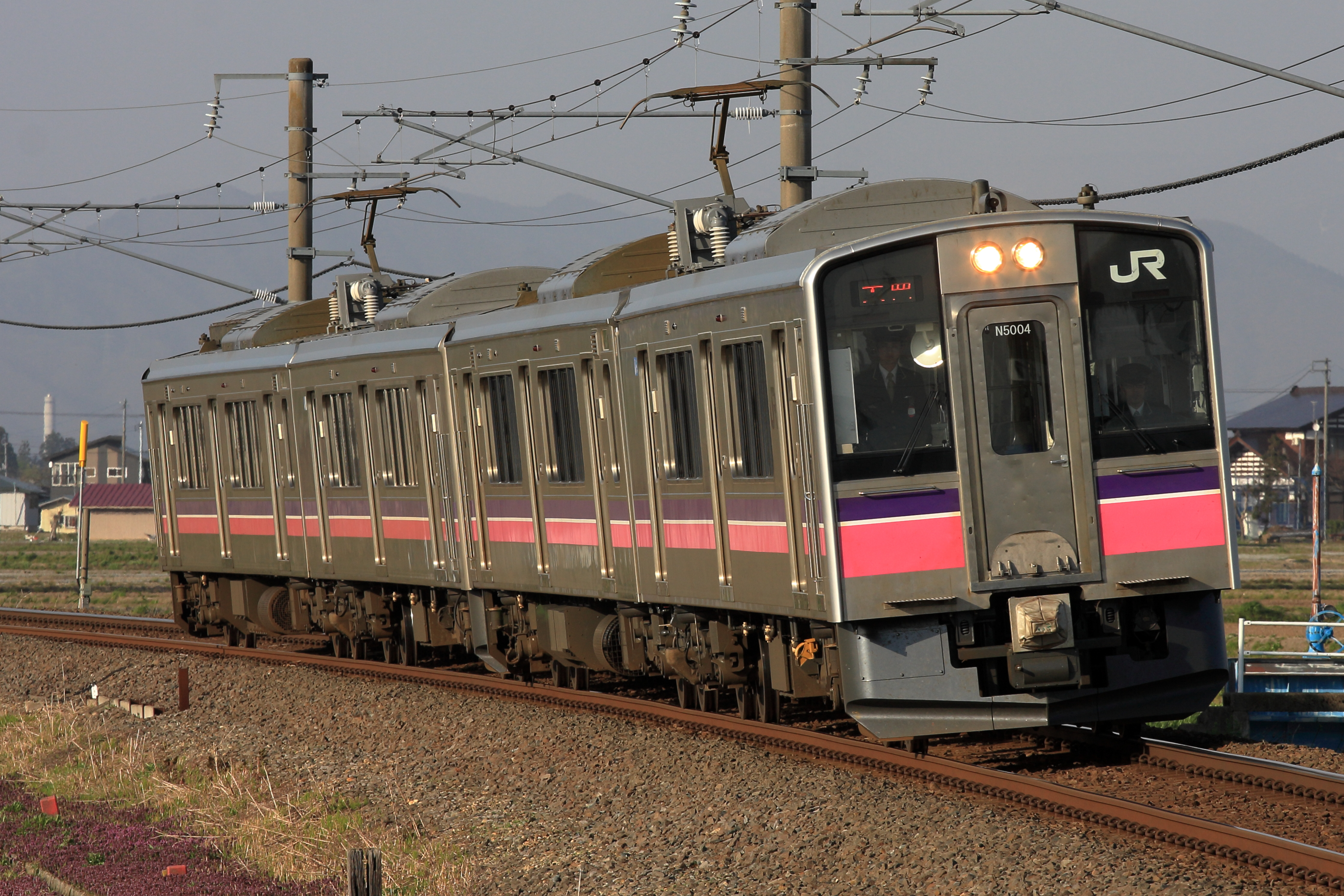
Tazawako Line 701-5000 series in 2015

Ten 2-car sets (numbered N5001 to N5010) were delivered to Akita depot between 1996 and 1997, entering service from 22 March 1997 on the 1,435 mm (4 ft 8 1/2 in) standard gauge sections of the Tazawako Line between Morioka and Ōmagari, and on the Ōu Main Line between Ōmagari and Akita. These sets were based on the earlier 701-1000 series, with some transverse seating, PS106 single-arm pantographs, and ATS-P.

=== Formation ===
Designation	Mc	Tc'
Numbering	KuMoHa 701-5000	KuHa 700-5000

The KuMoHa 701 car is fitted with one PS105 lozenge-type pantograph. The KuHa 700 car is fitted with a toilet and wheelchair space.

=== Interior ===
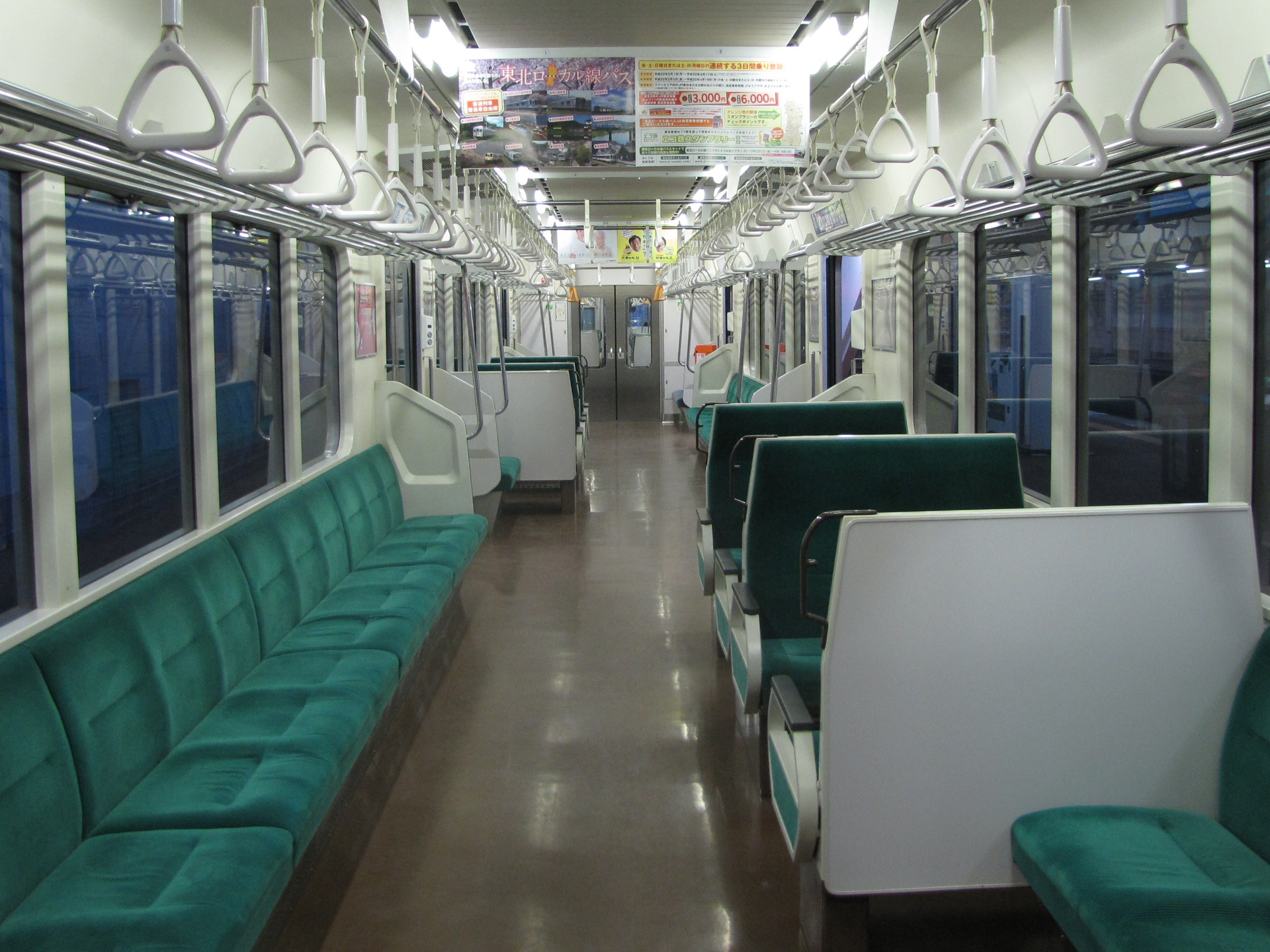
Interior view of KuMoHa 701-5002, showing mixed longitudinal and transverse seating

== 701-5500 series ==
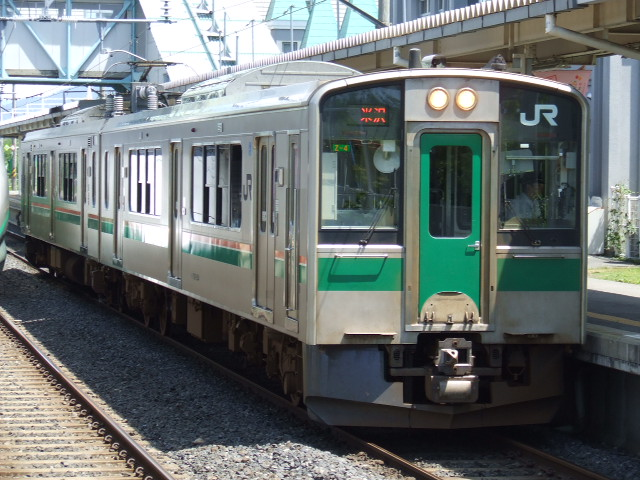
Ōu Main Line 701-5500 series set Z4 in June 2007

Nine two-car 1,435 mm (4 ft 8 1/2 in) standard gauge sets (numbered Z1 to Z9) were delivered to Yamagata depot in 1999, ahead of the opening of the extension of the Yamagata Shinkansen to Shinjō in November 1999. During 2001, the original PS105 lozenge-type pantographs were replaced with PS106B single-arm pantographs. Snowploughs were added to the front ends at the same time.

The fleet is used on the Ōu Main Line between Yonezawa and Shinjō.

The fleet of nine trainsets underwent a programme of refurbishment between 2013 and 2016. Improvements included replacement of electrical converters and transformers with similar equipment to that used on the later E721 series trains, as well as new flooring material internally.

=== Formation ===
Designation	Mc	Tc'
Numbering	KuMoHa 701-5000	KuHa 700-5000

The KuMoHa 701 car is fitted with one PS105 lozenge-type pantograph. The KuHa 700 car is fitted with a toilet and wheelchair space.

== Aoimori 701 series ==
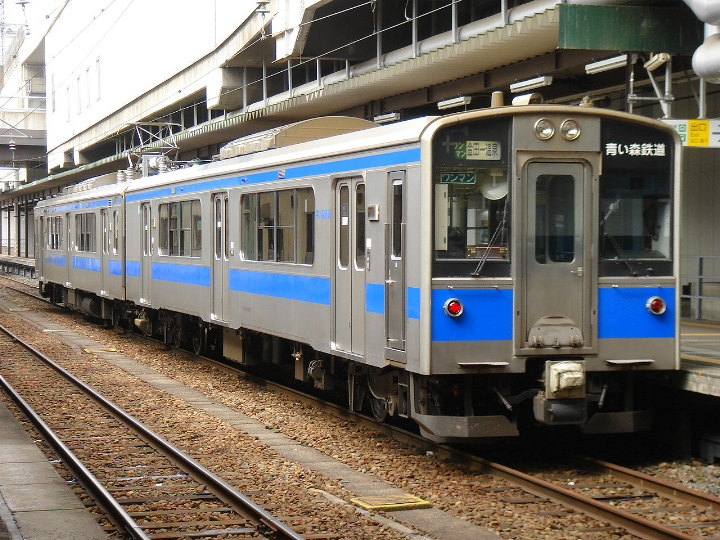
Aoimori Railway 701 series at Morioka Station in March 2007

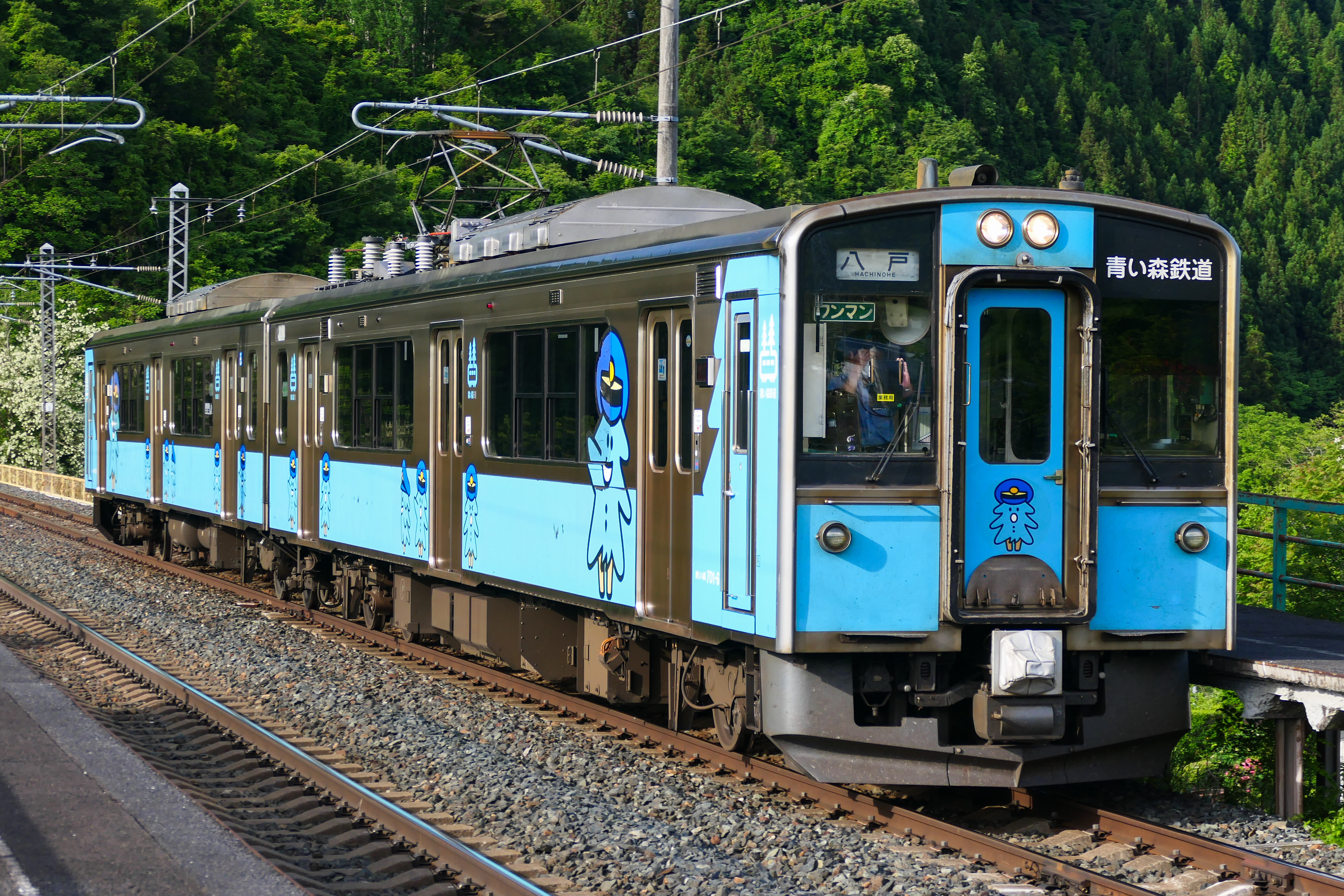
Aoimori Railway 701 series in new livery at Metoki Station in May 2024

The Aoimori Railway 701 series fleet consists of one 701-0 series set, which was originally a JR East 701-1000 series set transferred from Morioka in December 2002, and a newly built 701-100 series set delivered in September 2002. The 701-100 series set has some transverse seating.

A further seven two-car (former 701-1000 series) sets were transferred from JR East during 2010 ahead of the transfer of passenger operations from JR East on the section from Hachinohe to Aomori when the Tohoku Shinkansen extension to Shin-Aomori opened in December 2010. These units are modified with the addition of some transverse seating. The Aoimori Railway fleet was repainted into a new lighter blue livery incorporating the railway's "Mori" mascot logo.

=== Formation ===
Designation	Mc	Tc'
Numbering	Aoimori 701	Aoimori 700

The Aoimori 701 car is fitted with a PS105 lozenge-type pantograph. The Aoimori 700 car is fitted with a toilet and wheelchair space.

== IGR 7000 series ==
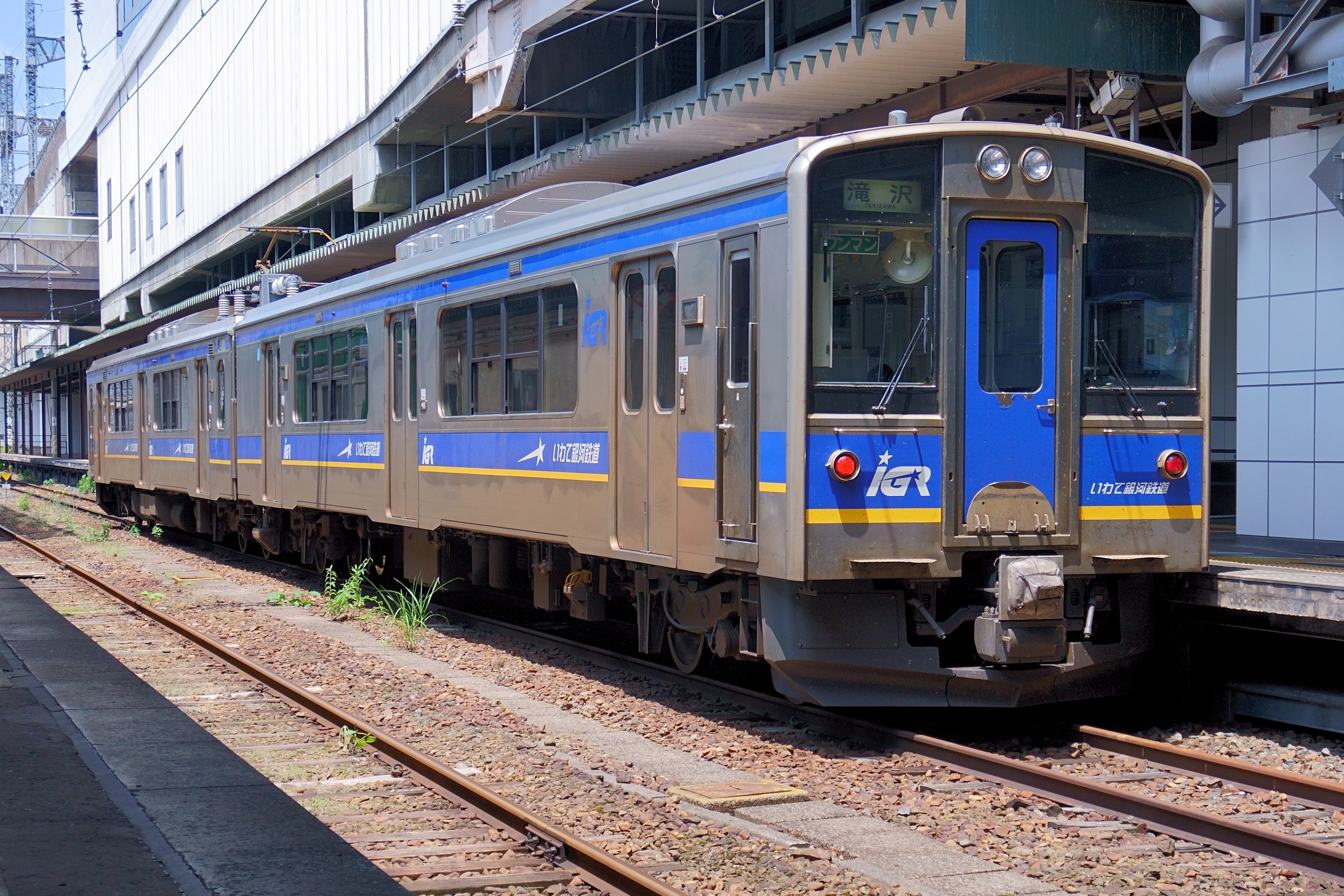
IGR 7000 series at Morioka Station in June 2023

The Iwate Galaxy Railway Line 7000 series fleet consists of four 7000-0 series sets, which were originally JR East 701-1000 series sets transferred from Morioka in December 2002, and three newly built 7000-100 series sets delivered in September 2002. The 7000-100 series sets have some transverse seating.

=== Formations ===
==== IGR 7000-0 series ====
Designation	Mc	Tc'
Numbering	IGR 7001	IGR 7000
Capacity (total/seated)	135/54	133/48

The 7001 car is fitted with a PS105 lozenge-type pantograph. The 7000 car is fitted with a toilet and wheelchair space.

==== IGR 7000-100 series ====
Designation	Mc	Tc'
Numbering	IGR 7001-100	IGR 7000-100
Capacity (total/seated)	133/56	125/46

The 7001 car is fitted with a PS105 lozenge-type pantograph. The 7000 car is fitted with a toilet and wheelchair space.

== Livery variations ==
Operating area	Front end	Body side
Aomori/Morioka
Tazawako Line (Standard gauge)
Akita
Sendai
Yamagata (Standard gauge)
Aoimori Railway (until 2010)
Iwate Galaxy Railway
