= List of highways numbered 706 =

The following highways are numbered 706:

== Costa Rica ==
- National Route 706

== United States ==
- SR 706
- MD 706
- PA 706
- PR-706
- FM 706
- SR 706

Preceded by 705	Lists of highways 706	Succeeded by 707
