= List of highways numbered 703 =

The following highways are numbered 703:

== Canada ==
- Highway 703

== Costa Rica ==
- National Route 703

== United States ==
- SR 703
- SR 703
- MD 703
- FM 703

Preceded by 702	Lists of highways 703	Succeeded by 704
