= List of highways numbered 702 =

The following highways are numbered 702:

== Costa Rica ==
- National Route 702

== United States ==
- SR 702 (former)
- MD 702
- PA 702
- PR-702
- FM 702
- SR 702

Preceded by 701	Lists of highways 702	Succeeded by 703
