= Ichinohe, Iwate =

Ichinohe 一戸町
- Town
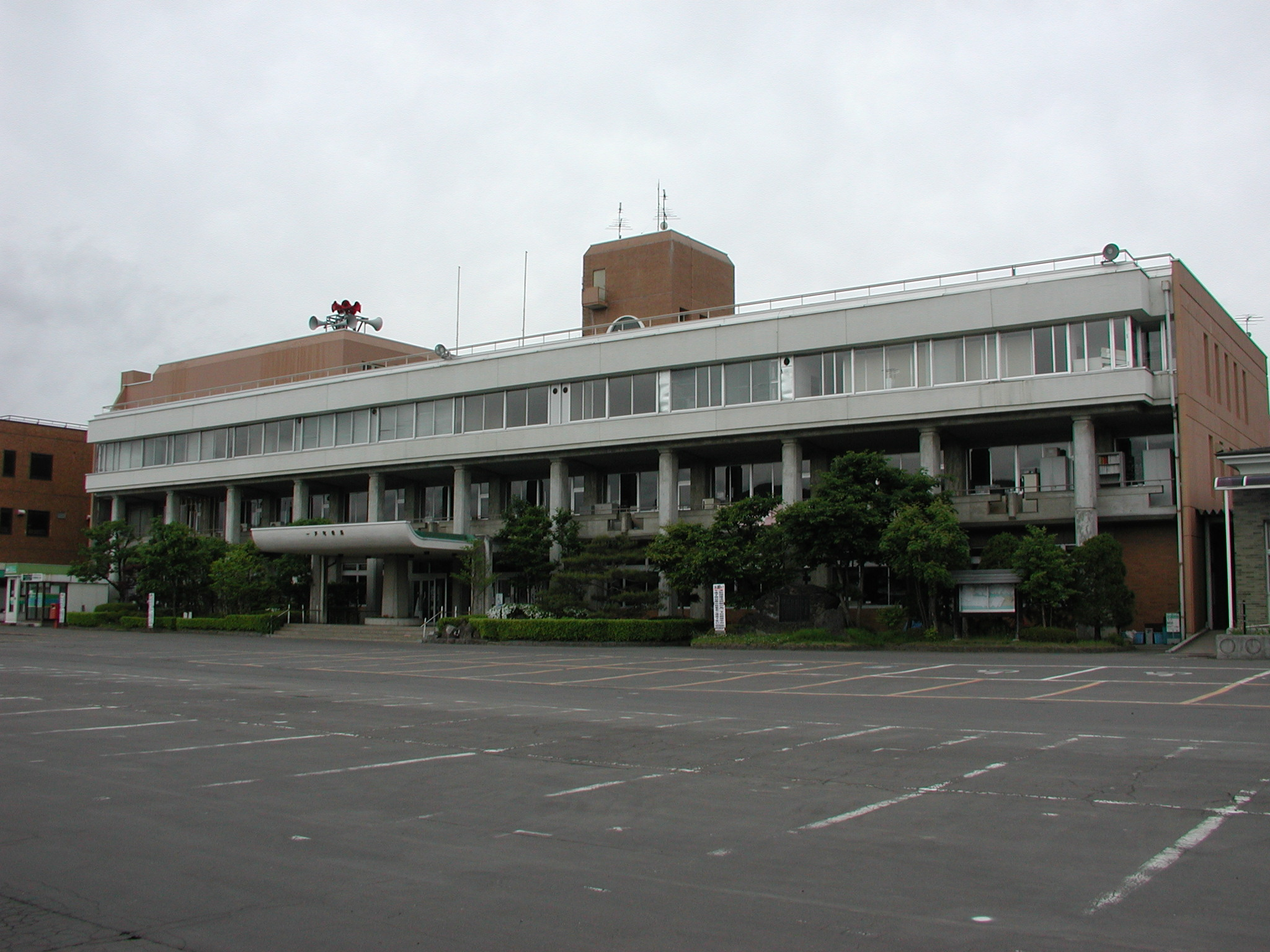
- Ichinohe Town Hall

- Flag Seal

- Location of Ichinohe in Iwate Prefecture

- Coordinates: 40°12′46.4″N 141°17′43.6″E
- Country: Japan
- Region: Tōhoku
- Prefecture: Iwate
- District: Ninohe

Area
  - Total: 300.03 km^{2} (115.84 sq mi)

Population (April 1, 2020)
  - Total: 12,053
  - Density: 40.173/km^{2} (104.05/sq mi)
- Time zone: UTC+9 (Japan Standard Time)
- Phone number: 0195-33-2111
- Address: Kōzenji-Ōkawabachi 24-9, Ichinohe-machi, Ninohe-gun, Iwate 028-5391
- Climate: Dfb
- Website: Official website
- Symbols
- Bird: Copper pheasant
- Flower: Sakura
- Tree: Oak

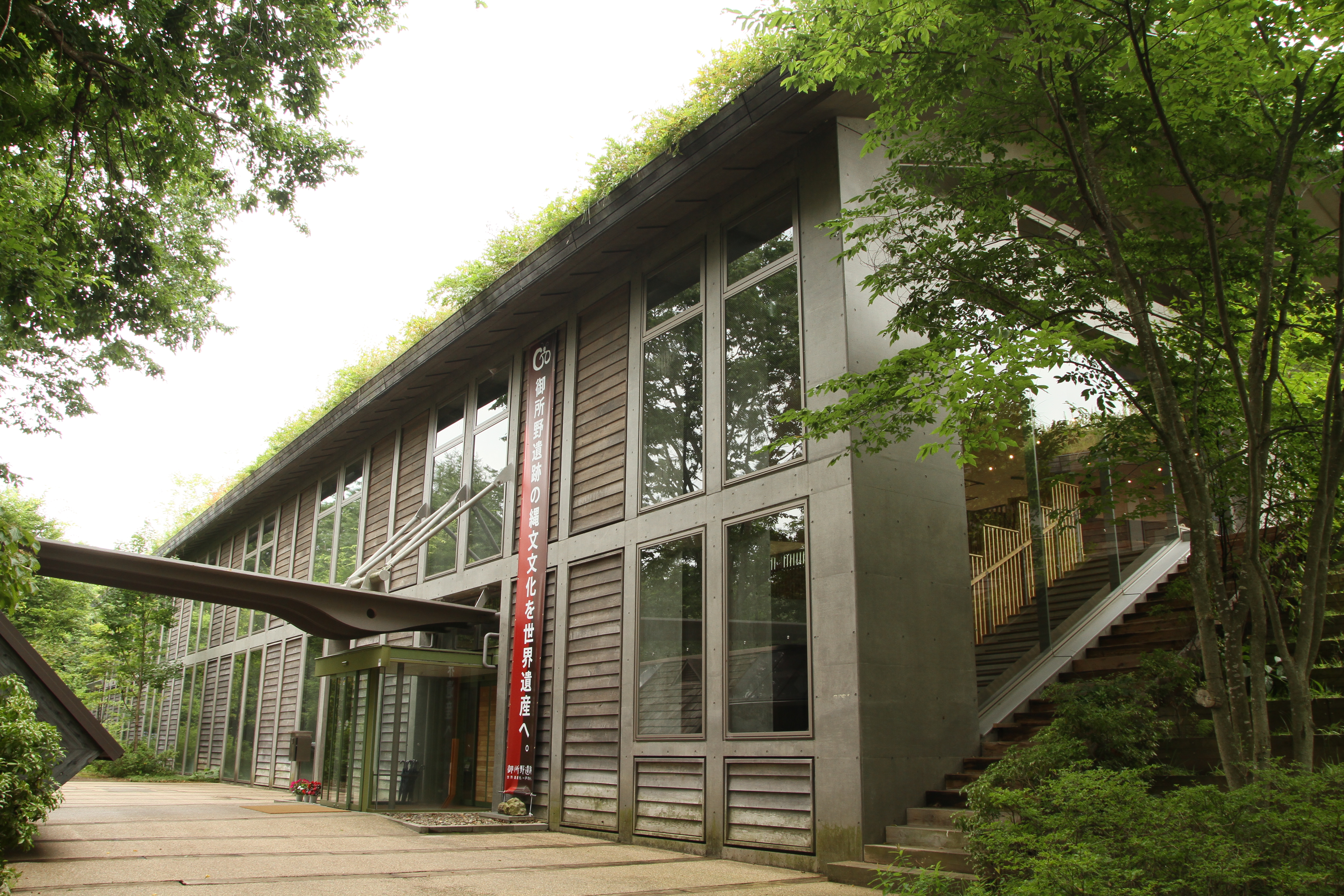
Goshono Jōmon Museum

Ichinohe (一戸町, Ichinohe-machi) is a town located in Iwate Prefecture, Japan. As of 1 April 2020, the town had an estimated population of 12,053, and a population density of 40 persons per km^{2} in 5645 households. The total area of the town is 300.03 square kilometres (115.84 sq mi).

== Geography ==
Ichinohe is located in far north-central Iwate Prefecture, roughly in between the Ōu Mountains and the Kitakami Mountains. Approximately 61% of the town's area is covered in mountains and forest. The Mabechi River flows through the town.

=== Neighboring municipalities ===
Iwate Prefecture

- Hachimantai
- Iwate
- Kunohe
- Kuzumaki
- Ninohe

== Climate ==
Ichinohe has a cold humid continental climate (Köppen Dfb) characterized by mild summers and cold winters with heavy snowfall. The average annual temperature in Ichinohe is 8.1 °C. The average annual rainfall is 1372 mm with September as the wettest month and February as the driest month. The temperatures are highest on average in August, at around 21.6 °C, and lowest in January, at around -4.3 °C.

Climate data for Okunakayama, Ichinohe (elevation 430 m, 1991–2020 normals, extremes 1977–present)
Month	Jan	Feb	Mar	Apr	May	Jun	Jul	Aug	Sep	Oct	Nov	Dec	Year
Record high °C (°F)	10.8 (51.4)	12.4 (54.3)	18.2 (64.8)	26.7 (80.1)	31.1 (88.0)	30.9 (87.6)	33.6 (92.5)	33.5 (92.3)	31.5 (88.7)	26.6 (79.9)	20.4 (68.7)	15.1 (59.2)	33.6 (92.5)
Mean daily maximum °C (°F)	−1.0 (30.2)	0.1 (32.2)	4.1 (39.4)	11.7 (53.1)	18.0 (64.4)	21.5 (70.7)	24.5 (76.1)	25.6 (78.1)	21.6 (70.9)	15.4 (59.7)	8.3 (46.9)	1.6 (34.9)	12.6 (54.7)
Daily mean °C (°F)	−4.5 (23.9)	−3.9 (25.0)	−0.3 (31.5)	6.0 (42.8)	12.1 (53.8)	16.1 (61.0)	19.9 (67.8)	20.9 (69.6)	16.7 (62.1)	10.1 (50.2)	3.8 (38.8)	−1.9 (28.6)	7.9 (46.2)
Mean daily minimum °C (°F)	−9.6 (14.7)	−9.2 (15.4)	−5.5 (22.1)	0.3 (32.5)	6.1 (43.0)	11.3 (52.3)	16.2 (61.2)	17.1 (62.8)	12.3 (54.1)	4.9 (40.8)	−1.0 (30.2)	−6.1 (21.0)	3.1 (37.6)
Record low °C (°F)	−20.7 (−5.3)	−21.5 (−6.7)	−20.1 (−4.2)	−13.2 (8.2)	−4.2 (24.4)	−0.2 (31.6)	6.3 (43.3)	6.0 (42.8)	−0.8 (30.6)	−4.5 (23.9)	−13.1 (8.4)	−18.2 (−0.8)	−21.5 (−6.7)
Average precipitation mm (inches)	51.1 (2.01)	44.6 (1.76)	63.2 (2.49)	66.0 (2.60)	83.7 (3.30)	105.2 (4.14)	182.6 (7.19)	179.0 (7.05)	155.4 (6.12)	117.4 (4.62)	84.2 (3.31)	77.0 (3.03)	1,203 (47.36)
Average snowfall cm (inches)	156 (61)	134 (53)	112 (44)	16 (6.3)	0 (0)	0 (0)	0 (0)	0 (0)	0 (0)	0 (0)	24 (9.4)	133 (52)	571 (225)
Average precipitation days (≥ 1.0 mm)	13.1	12.2	12.4	11.1	10.9	10.5	12.6	12.7	12.5	12.6	14.0	14.6	148.0
Mean monthly sunshine hours	69.0	83.5	129.4	169.8	189.4	157.1	127.8	142.7	130.1	137.7	106.7	69.9	1,516.2
Source: Japan Meteorological Agency (1991–2020 normals, extremes 1977–present)

== Demographics ==
Per Japanese census data, the population of Ichinohe peaked in the 1950s has declined steadily over the past 60 years.

Historical population
Year	Pop.	±%
1920	16,592	—
1930	19,095	+15.1%
1940	20,048	+5.0%
1950	25,273	+26.1%
1960	26,228	+3.8%
1970	23,176	−11.6%
1980	20,861	−10.0%
1990	18,610	−10.8%
2000	16,933	−9.0%
2010	14,189	−16.2%
2020	11,494	−19.0%

== History ==
The area of present-day Ichinohe was part of ancient Mutsu Province, and has been settled since at least the Jōmon period. Many Jōmon and Kofun period remains have been found. Inhabited by the Emishi tribes, the Nihon Shoki describes the penetration of the area by forces of the imperial dynasty in the Nara period; however, it was not under effective control of the central government until the mid-Heian period. The area was dominated by the Nanbu clan from the early Muromachi period, and was named for one of the nine numbered stockades, or fortified ranches, that established to secure this frontier area. During the Edo period Tokugawa shogunate, the area was under the control of Morioka Domain.

In the early Meiji period, the modern town of Ichinohe was created within Ninohe District on April 1, 1889, with the establishment of the modern municipalities system. The neighboring villages of Anetai, Kozuya, Chōkai, and Namiuchi were merged with Ichinohe on January 1, 1955.

== Government ==
Ichinohe has a mayor-council form of government with a directly elected mayor and a unicameral town council of 14 members. Ichinohe, and the city of Ninohe together contribute two seats to the Iwate Prefectural legislature. In terms of national politics, the town is part of Iwate 2nd district of the lower house of the Diet of Japan.

== Economy ==
The economy of Ichinohe is based primarily on agriculture.

== Education ==
Ichinohe has seven public elementary schools and four public middle schools operated by the town government, and two public high schools operated by the Iwate Prefectural Board of Education. The prefecture also operates two special education schools for the handicapped.

== Transportation ==
=== Railway ===
Iwate Ginga Railway Line

- Okunakayama-Kōgen - Kotsunagi- Kozuya - Ichinohe

=== Highway ===
- Hachinohe Expressway – Ichinohe IC
- National Route 4

== Local attractions ==
- Basenkyo ravine on the Mabechi River, a National Place of Scenic Beauty.
- Goshono Site (御所野遺跡, Goshono-isseki) is a park containing extensive Jōmon period remains, including the foundations for numerous pit dwellings. The area is a National Historic Site and has been submitted for inscription on the UNESCO World Heritage List as one of the Jōmon Archaeological Sites in Hokkaidō, Northern Tōhoku, and other regions
- Ōshū Kaidō (奥州街道, Ōshū Kaidō) - a number of sections of the Ōshū Kaidō, an ancient highway linking Kyoto with northern Japan has been preserved within Ichinohe as a National Historic Site

== Notable people from Ichinohe ==
- Yasutake Funakoshi, sculptor
