= Iwate, Iwate =

Iwate 岩手町
- Town
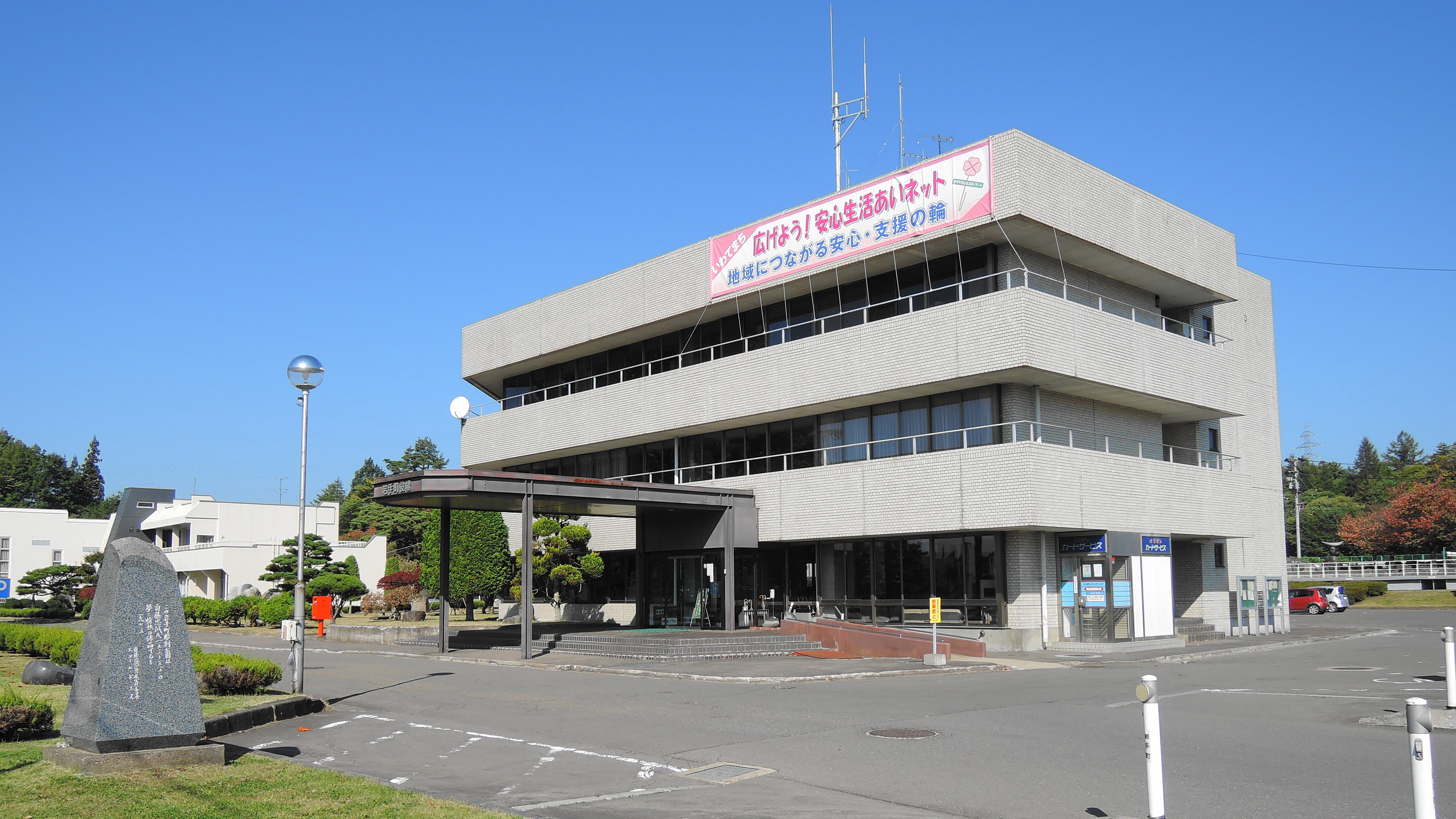
- Iwate Town Hall

- Flag Seal

- Location of Iwate in Iwate Prefecture

- Location within Japan
- Coordinates: 39°58′22″N 141°12′43.8″E
- Country: Japan
- Region: Tōhoku
- Prefecture: Iwate
- District: Iwate

Government
  - Mayor: Kōji Sasaki

Area
  - Total: 360.46 km^{2} (139.17 sq mi)

Population (February 29, 2020)
  - Total: 13,111
  - Density: 36.373/km^{2} (94.206/sq mi)
- Time zone: UTC+9 (Japan Standard Time)
- City symbols
  - Tree: Pine
  - Flower: Rindo
  - Bird: Green pheasant
- Phone number: 0195-62-2111
- Address: Itsukaichi dai-10 jiwari 44, Iwate-machi, Iwate-gun, Iwate-ken 028-4395
- Website: Official website

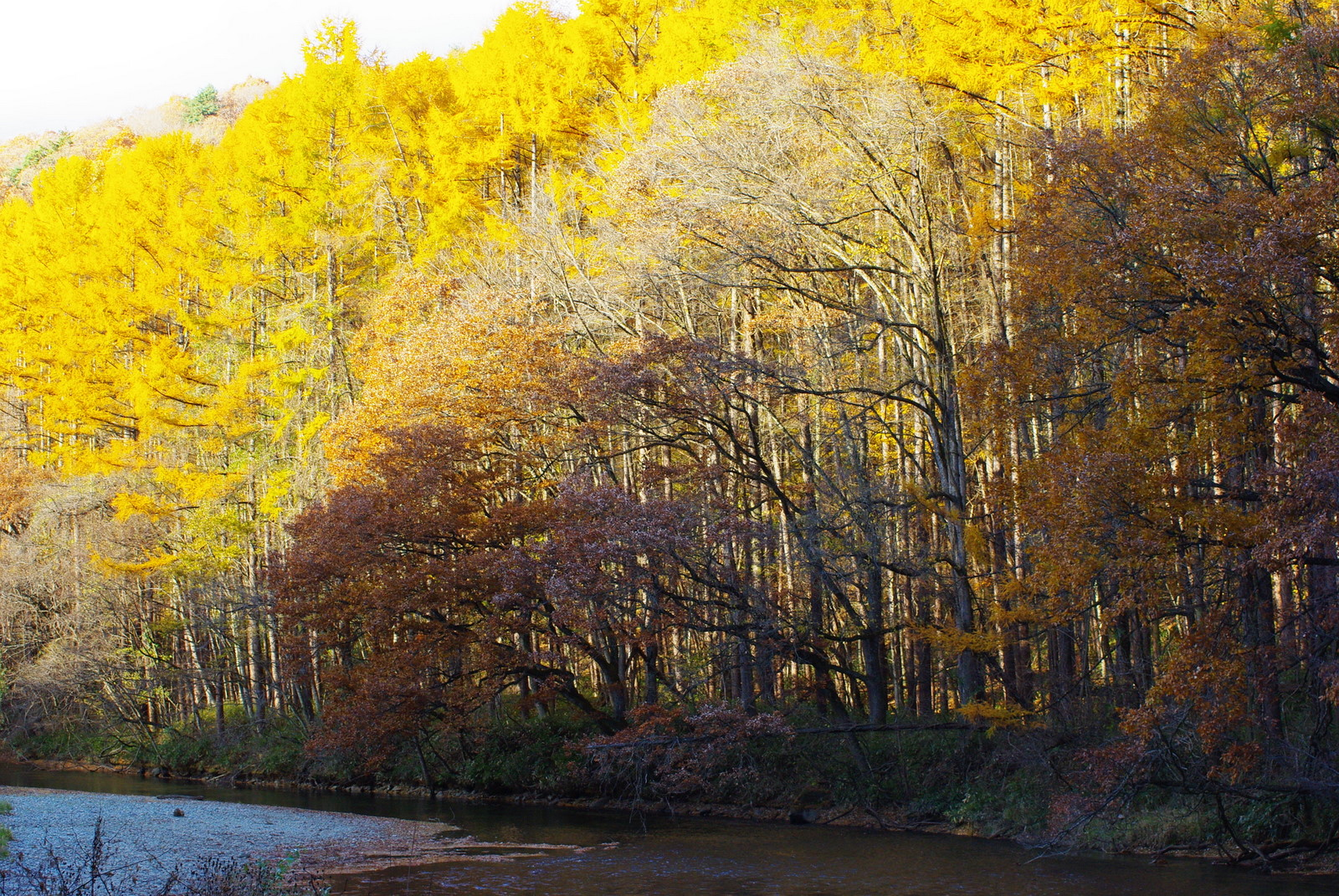
Tando River in Iwate

Iwate (岩手町, Iwate-machi) is a town located in Iwate Prefecture, Japan. As of 29 February 2020, the town had an estimated population of 13,111, and a population density of 36 persons per km^{2} in 5455 households. The total area of the town is 360.46 square kilometres (139.17 sq mi).

== Geography ==
Iwate is located in an inland region in northwest Iwate Prefecture.

=== Neighboring municipalities ===
Iwate Prefecture

- Hachimantai
- Ichinohe
- Kuzumaki
- Morioka

=== Climate ===
Iwate Town has a humid continental climate (Köppen climate classification Dfa) characterized by mild summers and cold winters. The average annual temperature in Iwate is 8.4 °C. The average annual rainfall is 1384 mm with September as the wettest month, and February as the driest month. The temperatures are highest on average in August, at around 22.0 °C, and lowest in January, at around -4.1 °C.

== Demographics ==
Per Japanese census data, the population of Iwate has steadily declined over the past 60 years.

Historical population
Year	Pop.	±%
1920	12,922	—
1930	14,592	+12.9%
1940	16,134	+10.6%
1950	20,744	+28.6%
1960	23,230	+12.0%
1970	21,725	−6.5%
1980	20,350	−6.3%
1990	19,141	−5.9%
2000	17,372	−9.2%
2010	14,988	−13.7%
2020	12,285	−18.0%

== History ==
The area of present-day Iwate was part of ancient Mutsu Province. It was under the control of the Nambu clan during the Edo period, who ruled Morioka Domain under the Tokugawa shogunate.

Numakunai, Kawaguchi, Ikkatai and Midō villages were created within Kita-Iwate District on April 1, 1889, with the establishment of the modern municipality system. Kita-Iwate and Minami-Iwate Districts merged to form Iwate District on March 29, 1896. The four villages merged to form Iwate Town on July 21, 1955.

== Government ==
Iwate has a mayor-council form of government with a directly elected mayor and a unicameral town council of 14 members. Iwate, together with the city of Hachimantai and the town of Kuzumaki, contributes two seats to the Iwate Prefectural legislature. In terms of national politics, the town is part of Iwate 2nd district of the lower house of the Diet of Japan.

== Economy ==
The local economy is based on agriculture. Iwate is famous for its blueberry production.

== Education ==
Iwate has five public elementary schools and three public middle schools operated by the town government, and one public high school operated by the Iwate Prefectural Board of Education.

== Sports ==
Iwate is home to FC Zebra Ladies Iwate, a women's football team playing in the Tohoku Women's Football League Division 2.

== Transportation ==
=== Railway ===
East Japan Railway Company (JR East) - Tōhoku Shinkansen

- Iwate-Numakunai

Iwate Ginga Railway Line

- Iwate-Kawaguchi - Iwate-Numakunai - Midō

=== Highway ===
- National Route 4 – Ishigami-no-oka roadside station
- National Route 281

== Local attractions ==
- Ishigami-no-Oka Art Museum

== Notable people from Iwate ==
- Seishirō Itagaki, Imperial Japanese Army general
- Sayaka Nakaya, voice actress
