= Iwate Galaxy Railway Line =

Railway line in Japan

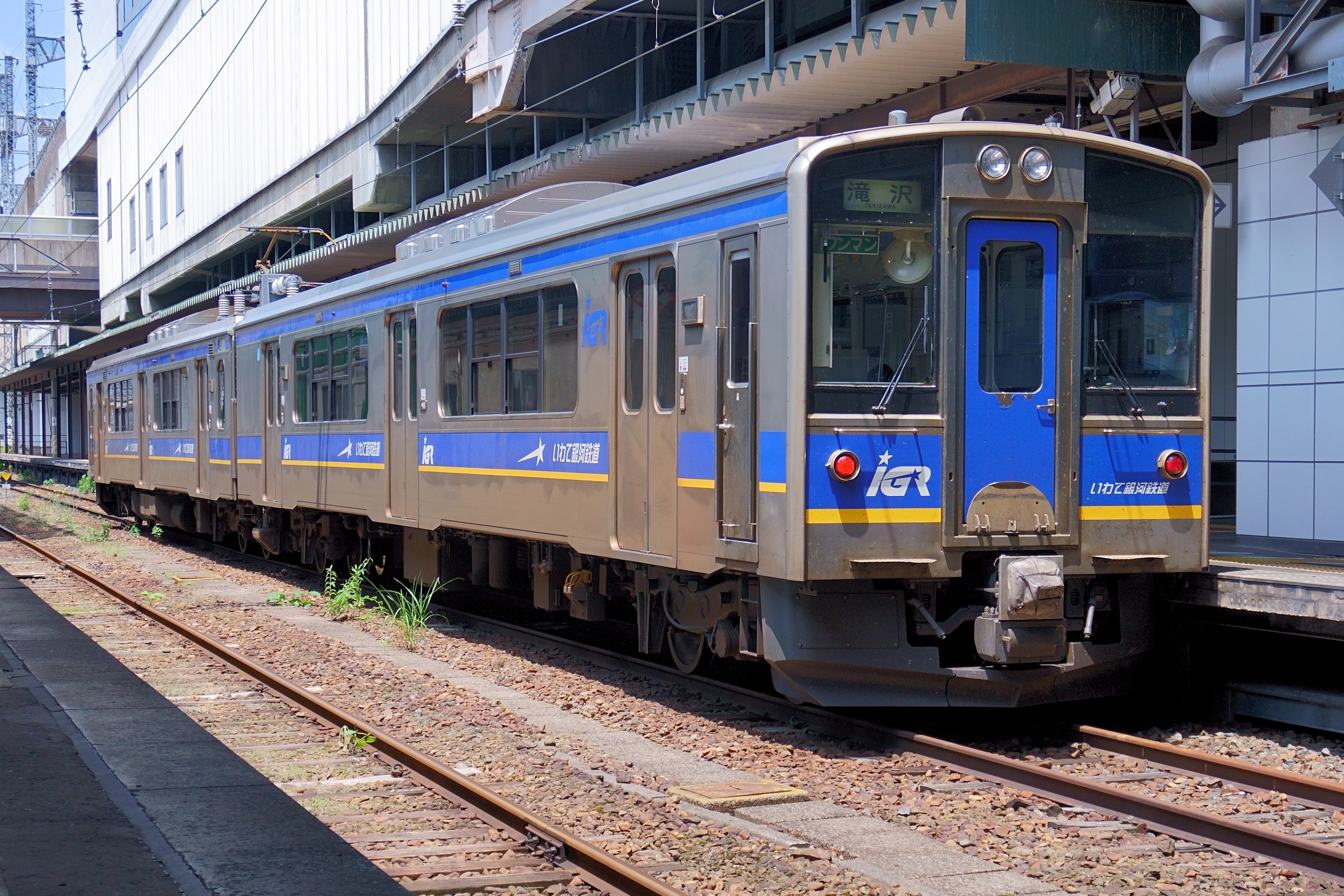
- IGR 7000 series EMU at Morioka Station, June 2023

Overview
- Native name: いわて銀河鉄道線
- Owner: Iwate Galaxy Railway Company
- Locale: Iwate Prefecture
- Termini: Morioka; Metoki
- Stations: 16

Service
- Rolling stock: IGR 7000 series

History
- Opened: 1 December 2002

Technical
- Line length: 82 km (51 mi)
- Number of tracks: 2
- Track gauge: 1,067 mm (3 ft 6 in)
- Electrification: Overhead line, 20 kV 50 Hz AC
- Operating speed: 100 km/h (62 mph)
Route map

The Iwate Galaxy Railway Line (Japanese: いわて銀河鉄道線, Hepburn: Iwate Ginga Tetsudō-sen) is a railway line in Japan operated by third-sector railway company Iwate Galaxy Railway Company. It connects Morioka Station in Morioka, Iwate to Metoki Station in Sannohe, Aomori.

Formerly part of the East Japan Railway Company (JR East) Tōhoku Main Line, the line was separated on 1 December 2002 with the opening of the Tōhoku Shinkansen which parallels the route. JR Freight services continue to travel over the line.

== Operation ==
All trains operate as local services, stopping at every station.

Trains from Morioka terminate at various stations along the line, including Koma, Takizawa and Iwate-Numakunai. No trains terminate at Metoki; trains serving the station continue as a through service to or from Hachinohe on the Aoimori Railway Line.

== Station list ==
Station	Distance in km (mi)		Transfers	Location	
Station	Between stations	Total	Transfers	Location	
Morioka 盛岡	—N/a	0.0 (0)	Akita Shinkansen; Tōhoku Shinkansen; Tazawako Line; Tōhoku Main Line; Yamada Line	Morioka	Iwate
Aoyama 青山	3.2 (2.0)	3.2 (2.0)		Morioka	Iwate
Kuriyagawa 厨川	2.4 (1.5)	5.6 (3.5)		Morioka	Iwate
Sugo 巣子	4.6 (2.9)	10.2 (6.3)		Takizawa	Iwate
Takizawa 滝沢	2.0 (1.2)	12.2 (7.6)		Takizawa	Iwate
Shibutami 渋民	4.4 (2.7)	16.6 (10.3)		Morioka	Iwate
Kōma 好摩	4.7 (2.9)	21.3 (13.2)	Hanawa Line (through service)	Morioka	Iwate
Iwate-Kawaguchi 岩手川口	5.6 (3.5)	26.9 (16.7)		Iwate	Iwate
Iwate-Numakunai いわて沼宮内	5.1 (3.2)	32.0 (19.9)	Tōhoku Shinkansen	Iwate	Iwate
Midō 御堂	5.3 (3.3)	37.3 (23.2)		Iwate	Iwate
Okunakayama-Kōgen 奥中山高原	7.1 (4.4)	44.4 (27.6)		Ichinohe	Iwate
Kotsunagi 小繋	7.8 (4.8)	52.2 (32.4)		Ichinohe	Iwate
Kozuya 小鳥谷	7.6 (4.7)	59.8 (37.2)		Ichinohe	Iwate
Ichinohe 一戸	4.7 (2.9)	64.5 (40.1)		Ichinohe	Iwate
Ninohe 二戸	6.3 (3.9)	70.8 (44.0)	Tōhoku Shinkansen	Ninohe	Iwate
Tomai 斗米	2.9 (1.8)	73.7 (45.8)		Ninohe	Iwate
Kintaichi-Onsen 金田一温泉	4.7 (2.9)	78.4 (48.7)		Ninohe	Iwate
Metoki 目時	3.6 (2.2)	82.0 (51.0)	Aoimori Railway Line (through service)	Sannohe	Aomori
↑ Through-running to/from Hachinohe via the Aoimori Railway Line ↓

== Rolling stock ==
The Iwate Galaxy Railway Company operates a fleet of seven IGR 7000 series 2-car electric multiple unit (EMU) trains. Its fleet comprises four 7000-0 series sets, originally JR East 701-1000 series sets transferred in December 2002, and three newly built 7000-100 series sets.

== History ==
The section of the line between Morioka and Metoki first opened on 1 September 1891, and was nationalized on 1 November 1906. The line was double-tracked by 12 July 1968, and it was electrified on 22 August 1968. With the privatization of Japanese National Railways (JNR) on 1 April 1987, the line came under the control of East Japan Railway Company (JR East). From 1 December 2002, with the opening of the parallel Tohoku Shinkansen extension to Hachinohe, ownership of the line was transferred to the third-sector Iwate Galaxy Railway Company.
