= List of highways numbered 707 =

The following highways are numbered 707:

== Costa Rica ==
- National Route 707

== United States ==
- SR 707 (former)
- MD 707
- PA 707
- PR-707
- FM 707

Preceded by 706	Lists of highways 707	Succeeded by 708
