= List of highways numbered 701 =

The following United States highways are numbered 701:

== United States ==
- U.S. Route 701
- Georgia State Route 701 (former)
- Ohio State Route 701
- Puerto Rico Highway 701

Preceded by 700	Lists of highways 701	Succeeded by 702
