= Ninohe Station =

Railway station in Ninohe, Iwate Prefecture, Japan

Ninohe Station 二戸駅
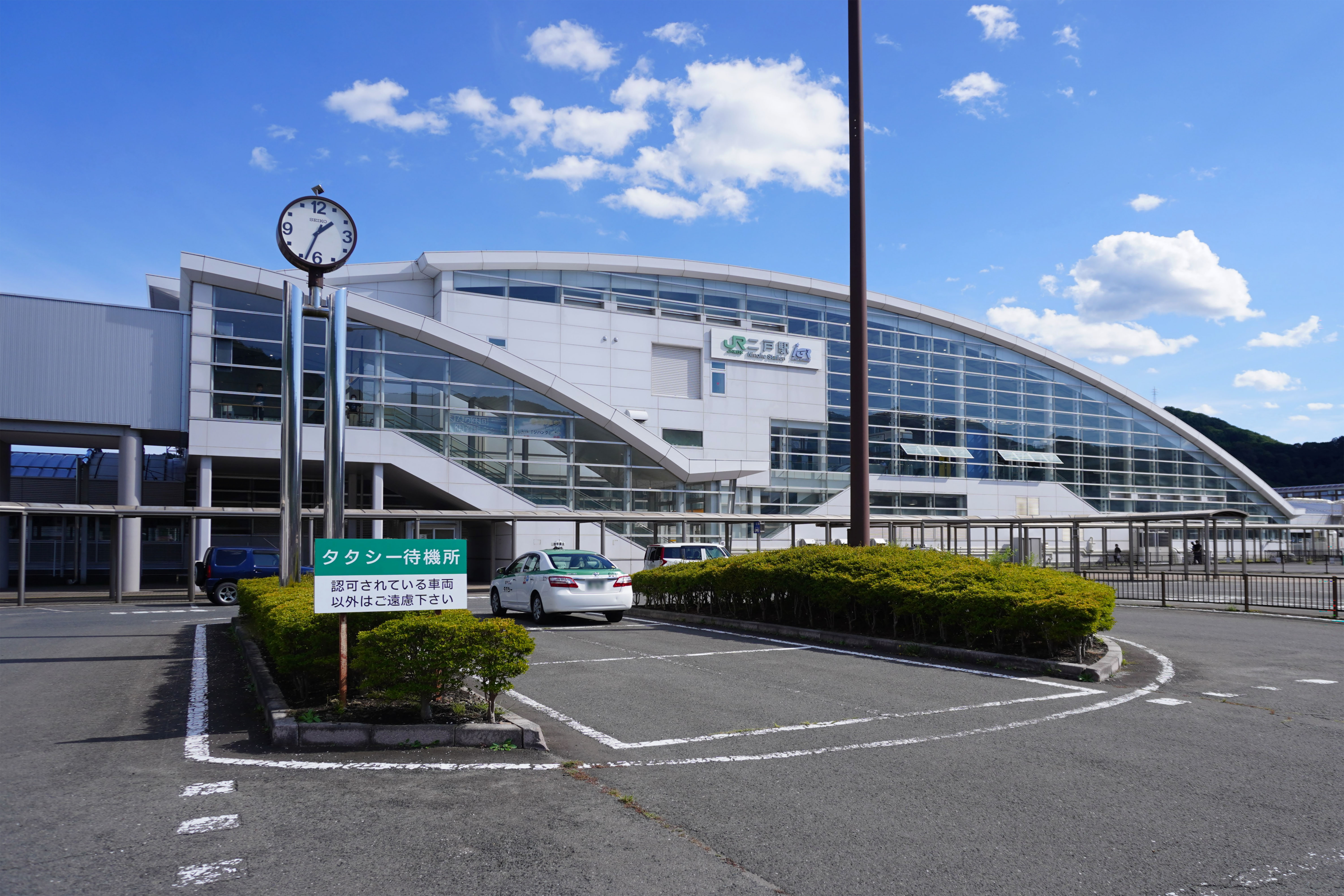
- Ninohe Station west entrance in September 2023

General information
- Location: Ishikiridokoro, Ninohe-shi, Iwate-ken 028-6103; Japan
- Coordinates: 40°15′36″N 141°17′09″E
- Operator: JR East; Iwate Galaxy Railway
- Lines: Tōhoku Shinkansen; Iwate Galaxy Railway Line
- Distance: 601.0 km (373.4 mi) from Tokyo
- Platforms: 3 side + 1 island platform
- Tracks: 5

Construction
- Structure type: Elevated

Other information
- Status: Staffed (Midori no Madoguchi)
- Website: Official website

History
- Opened: 20 December 1891; 134 years ago
- Former names: Fukuoka (until 1921); Kita-Fukuoka (until 1987)

Passengers
- FY2019: 788 daily (JR East); 721 daily (Iwate Ginga Railway)

Services
Preceding station	JR East	Following station
Iwate-Numakunai towards Tokyo	Tōhoku Shinkansen Hayabusa	Hachinohe towards Shin-Aomori
Morioka Terminus	Tōhoku Shinkansen Hayate	Hachinohe towards Shin-Aomori
Preceding station	Iwate Galaxy Railway	Following station
Ichinohe towards Morioka	Iwate Galaxy Railway Line	Tomai towards Metoki
Location
- Location within Iwate Prefecture Location within Japan

Ninohe Station (二戸駅, Ninohe-eki) is a junction railway station in the city of Ninohe, Iwate, Japan, operated by JR East for the Tohoku Shinkansen and the third-sector railway operator Iwate Ginga Railway Company for local services.

== Lines ==
Ninohe Station is served by the Tōhoku Shinkansen high-speed line from Tokyo to Shin-Aomori, and is 601.0 kilometers from the terminus of the line at Tokyo Station. It is also a station on the Iwate Ginga Railway Line, and is 70.8 kilometers from the terminus of that line at Morioka Station.

== Station layout ==
The JR East Ninohe Station has two elevated opposed side platforms, with the station building located underneath. The platforms have chest-high platform edge doors, and the tracks are covered with a roof to form a snow shelter. The station has a Midori no Madoguchi staffed ticket office.

The adjacent Iwate Ginga Railway Station has a ground level island platform and a single side platform connected to the three-story station building by an overhead crossing. The station is staffed.

=== Platforms ===
1	■ Tohoku Shinkansen	for Morioka, Sendai, and Tokyo
2	■ Tohoku Shinkansen	for Hachinohe and Shin-Aomori

1	■ Iwate Ginga Railway Line	for Ichinohe, and Morioka
2	■ Iwate Ginga Railway Line	(passing loop)
3	■ Iwate Ginga Railway Line	for Sannohe and Hachinohe

Some Shinkansen trains pass this station.

== Connecting bus routes ==
- JR Bus Tohoku
  - For Morioka Station via Jōbōji and Araya-Shinmachi Station (Highway Bus "Super Yuyu")
  - For Kuji Station (Tohoku Shinkansen Relay Bus "Swallow")
  - For Kintaichi-Onsen Station, Kintaichi Onsen (Kintaichi Hot Spring) and Karumai Hospital
  - For Jōbōji
  - For Ichinohe Station
  - For Kuzumaki via Ichinohe Station and Kozuya Station
- Iwate Kenpoku Bus
  - For Ibonai

== History ==
The station opened on 20 December 1891 as Fukuoka Station (福岡駅). It was renamed Kita-Fukuoka Station (北福岡駅) on 1 June 1921, and Ninohe Station on 1 February 1987. The station was absorbed into the JR East network upon the privatization of the Japanese National Railways (JNR) on 1 April 1987, and was transferred to the Iwate Ginga Railway on 1 September 2002. Services on the Tohoku Shinkansen commenced 1 December 2002.

== Passenger statistics ==
In fiscal 2018, the JR East portion of the station was used by an average of 788 passengers daily (boarding passengers only). The Iwate Ginga Railway portion of the station was used by an average of 721 passengers daily.

== Surrounding area ==
- JR Bus Tōhoku Ninohe Bus office
- Ninohe Police station
- Ninohe City office Ishikiri branch office
- Ninohe Post office
- Iwate prefectural Fukuoka industry senior high school

== See also ==
- List of railway stations in Japan
