= Iwate-Numakunai Station =

Railway station in Iwate, Iwate Prefecture, Japan

Iwate-Numakunai Station いわて沼宮内駅
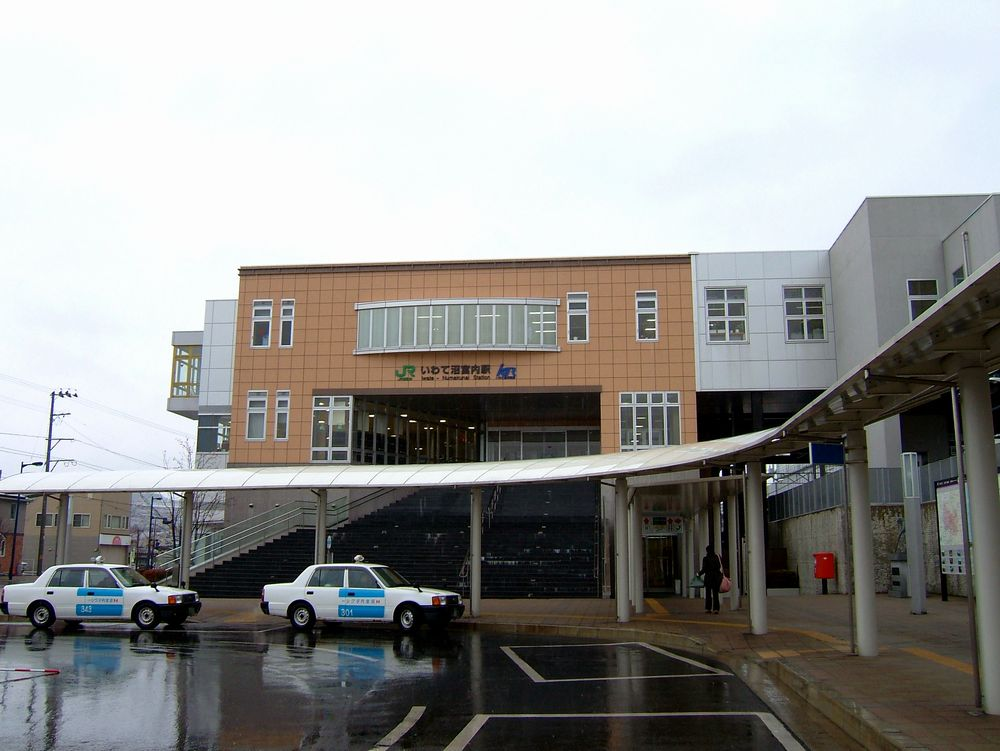
- Iwate-Numakunai Station in January 2007

General information
- Location: Ekarinai, Iwate-machi, Iwate-gun, Iwate-ken 028-4303; Japan
- Coordinates: 39°57′39″N 141°13′3.55″E
- Operator: JR East; Iwate Galaxy Railway
- Lines: Tōhoku Shinkansen; Iwate Galaxy Railway Line
- Distance: 566.2 km (351.8 mi) from Tokyo
- Platforms: 3 side + 1 island platforms
- Connections: Bus station

Construction
- Structure type: Elevated

Other information
- Status: Staffed (Midori no Madoguchi)
- Website: Official website

History
- Opened: 20 December 1891; 134 years ago
- Former names: Numakunai (until 2002)

Passengers
- FY2018: 83 daily (JR East); 869 daily (Iwate Ginga Railway)

Services
Preceding station	JR East	Following station
Morioka towards Tokyo	Tōhoku Shinkansen Hayabusa	Ninohe towards Shin-Aomori
Preceding station	Iwate Galaxy Railway	Following station
Iwate-Kawaguchi towards Morioka	Iwate Galaxy Railway Line	Midō towards Metoki
Location
- Location within Iwate Prefecture Location within Japan

Iwate-Numakunai Station (いわて沼宮内駅, Iwate-Numakunai-eki) is a junction railway station in the town of Iwate, Iwate, Japan, operated by JR East for the Tohoku Shinkansen and the third-sector railway operator Iwate Ginga Railway Company for local services.

== Lines ==
Iwate-Numakunai Station is served by both the Tohoku Shinkansen and the Iwate Ginga Railway Line. It is located 32.0 rail kilometers from the terminus of the Iwate Ginga Railway Line at Morioka Station and 566.2 rail kilometers from Tokyo Station by the Tōhoku Shinkansen.

== Station layout ==
The JR East Iwate-Numakunai Station has a four-story station building, with two elevated opposed side platforms on the fourth floor. The platforms have chest-high platform edge doors. The station has a Midori no Madoguchi staffed ticket office.

The adjacent Iwate Ginga Railway Station has a ground level island platform and a single side platform connected to the three-story station building by an overhead crossing. The station is staffed.

=== Platforms ===
1	■ Tohoku Shinkansen	for Hachinohe and Shin-Aomori
2	■ Tohoku Shinkansen	for Morioka, Sendai, and Tokyo

1	■ Iwate Ginga Railway Line	for Ninohe, Sannohe and Hachinohe
2	■ Iwate Ginga Railway Line	(passing loop)
3	■ Iwate Ginga Railway Line	for Kōma and Morioka

== Connecting bus routes ==
- JR Bus Tōhoku
  - For Kuji Station via Kuzumaki
  - For Morioka Station
- Iwate Kenhoku Bus via Iwate-Shibutami
  - For Morioka Bus Center via Morioka Station

== History ==
The station opened as Numakunai Station (沼宮内駅) on 1 September 1891. It was absorbed into the JR East network upon the privatization of the Japanese National Railways (JNR) on 1 April 1987 and was transferred to the Iwate Ginga Railway on 1 September 2002. Services on the Tohoku Shinkansen commenced 1 December 2002. The station was renamed Iwate-Numakunai at that time.

== Passenger statistics ==
In fiscal 2018, the JR East portion of the station was used by an average of 83 passengers daily (boarding passengers only). The Iwate Ginga Railway portion of the station was used by an average of 869 passengers daily.

== Surrounding area ==
- Iwate-Numakunai Eki-mae Post Office

== See also ==
- List of railway stations in Japan
