= Japan National Route 104 =

National highway in Japan

National Route 104
- 国道104号
- Japan National Route 104 highlighted in red

Route information
- Length: 126.3 km (78.5 mi)
- Existed: 1953–present

Major junctions
- East end: National Route 45 in Hachinohe, Aomori
- West end: National Route 7 / National Route 103 in Ōdate, Akita

Location
- Country: Japan

Highway system
- National highways of Japan; Expressways of Japan
← National Route 103	→ National Route 105

National Route 104 (国道104号, Kokudō Hyakuyongō) is a national highway of Japan connecting the cities of Hachinohe in southeastern Aomori Prefecture and Ōdate in northern Akita Prefecture in northern Japan. It travels east to west and has a total length of 126.3 kilometers (78.5 mi).

== Route description ==
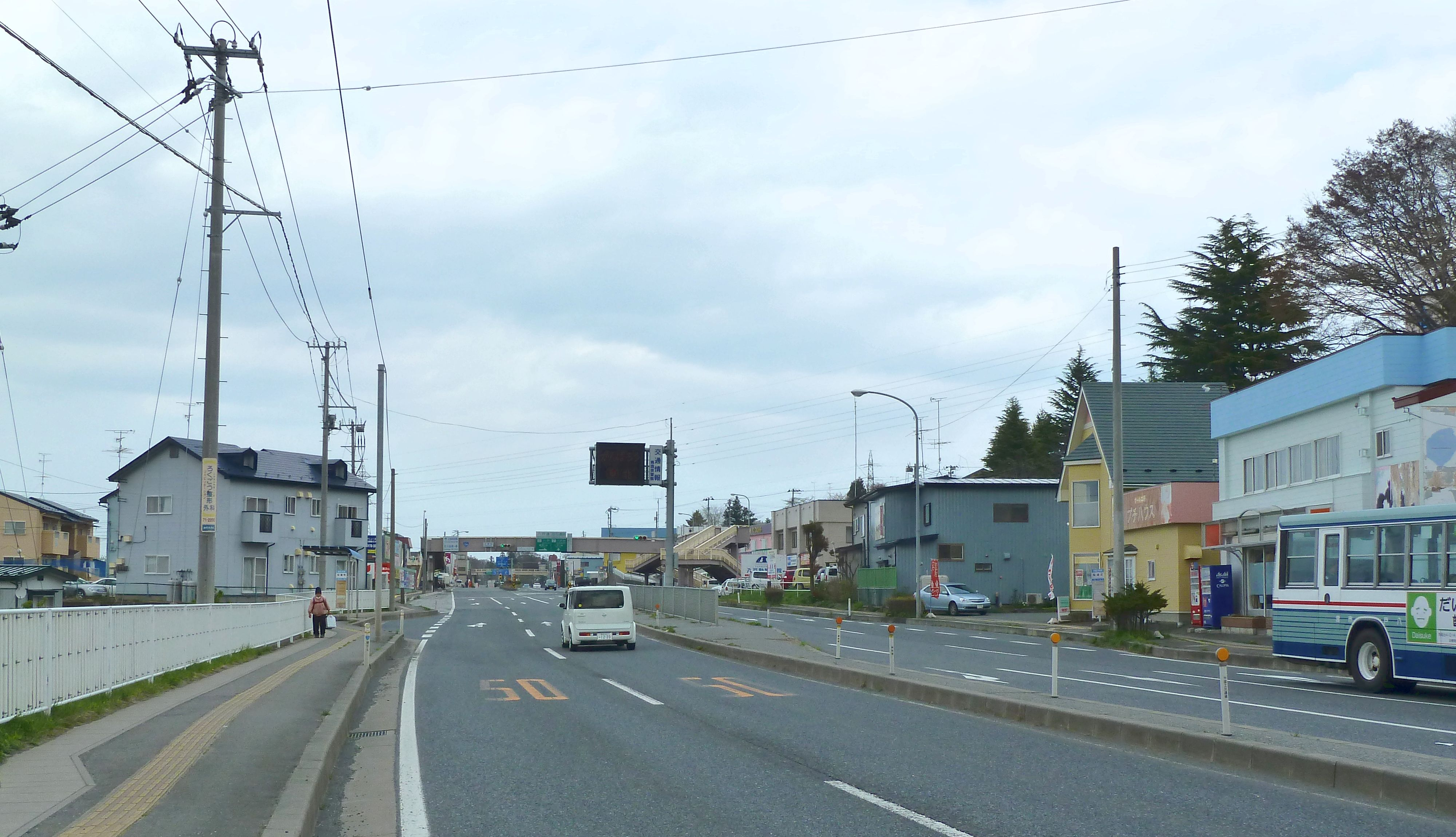
National Route 104 in Hachinohe

National Route 104 has a total length of 126.3 kilometers (78.5 mi). From its junction with National Route 454 in Hachinohe to the beginning of its unsigned concurrency with National Route 103 in Kazuno, the highway is known as the Shirahagi Line.

== History ==
National Route 104 was established by the Cabinet of Japan as a second-class national highway in 1953. The system of different classes of national highways was abolished in 1970, in turn, the highway was designated as National Route 104.

== Major intersections ==
All junctions listed are at-grade intersections unless noted otherwise.

Prefecture	Location	km	mi	Destinations	Notes
Aomori	Hachinohe	0.0	0.0	National Route 45 (Hachinohe Bypass) – to National Route 4, Aomori, Towada, Miyako, Kuji; Aomori Prefecture Route 8 north – Takadate	Eastern terminus; road continues as Aomori Prefecture Route 8
Aomori	Hachinohe	1.2	0.75	National Route 454 west – Gonohe, Hachinohe Station, Aomori Prefecture Route 19 north – Ferry Wharf	
Aomori	Hachinohe	2.6	1.6	Aomori Prefecture Route 251 east – Hachinohe City Office	
Aomori	Hachinohe	4.9	3.0	Aomori Prefecture Route 29 east – to Hachinohe Expressway, Hachinohe New Town	
Aomori	Hachinohe	7.7	4.8	Aomori Prefecture Route 134 south	
Aomori	Hachinohe	10.1	6.3	Aomori Prefecture Route 225 south – Nangō, Fukuchi Industrial Park	
Aomori	Nanbu	14.1	8.8	Aomori Prefecture Route 223 south – Fukuda	
Aomori	Nanbu	15.9	9.9	Aomori Prefecture Route 155 south – Kenyoshi Station	
Aomori	Nanbu	17.6	10.9	Aomori Prefecture Route 33 south – Karumai, Nangō	
Aomori	Nanbu	18.2	11.3	National Route 4 – Morioka, Ninohe, Aomori, Towada	Eastern end of National Route 4 concurrency
Aomori	See National Route 4				
Aomori	Sannohe	30.8	19.1	National Route 4 – Towada, Hachinohe, Morioka, Ninohe; Aomori Prefecture Route 258 north – Central Sannohe	Interchange; western end of National Route 4 concurrency
Aomori	Sannohe	33.5	20.8	Aomori Prefecture Route 182 south – Oshita	
Aomori	Sannohe	35.2	21.9	Aomori Prefecture Route 217 north – Kaimori	
Aomori	Takko	38.8	24.1	Aomori Prefecture Route 143 east – Kaimori	
Aomori	Takko	38.9	24.2	Aomori Prefecture Route 32 south – Ninohe	
Aomori	Takko	40.0	24.9	Aomori Prefecture Route 21 west – Lake Towada	
Aomori	Takko	50.1	31.1	Aomori Prefecture Route 181 south – Jōbōji	
Akita	Kazuno	73.0	45.4	Akita Prefecture Route 128 north – Tashirotai	
Akita	Kazuno	78.1	48.5	National Route 103 – Lake Towada, Ōdate	Eastern end of National Route 103 concurrency. National Route 104 is unsigned.
Akita	Kazuno	90.6	56.3	Akita Prefecture Route 66 south – Hanawa, Ōyu Stone Circle	
Akita	Kazuno	97.2	60.4	National Route 282 / National Route 285 west – Yuze, Hanawa, Hirakawa, Kosaka,	Eastern terminus of unsigned National Route 285; northern end of unsigned National Route 285 concurrency
Akita	Kazuno	106.1	65.9	Tōhoku Expressway – Aomori, Morioka, Sendai, Hachinohe Expressway	E4 exit 49 (Towada Interchange)
Akita	Ōdate	98.3	61.1	Akita Prefecture Route 66 south – Osarizawa	Interchange
Akita	Ōdate	115.4	71.7	National Route 285 west – Akita, Kitaakita, Odate–Noshiro Airport	Southern end of unsigned National Route 285 concurrency
Akita	Ōdate	122.5	76.1	Akita Prefecture Route 102 – Hinai, Central Ōdate	
Akita	Ōdate	123.8	76.9	Akita Expressway – Kitaakita, Hirosaki, Odate–Noshiro Airport	E7 exit 26 (Ōdate-minami Interchange)
Akita	Ōdate	126.3	78.5	National Route 7 – Noshiro, Kitaakita, Odate–Noshiro Airport, Central Ōdate	Western terminus; southern terminus of National Route 103
1.000 mi = 1.609 km; 1.000 km = 0.621 mi: Concurrency terminus
