= Japan National Route 103 =

National highway in Japan

National Route 103
- 国道103号
- Japan National Route 103 highlighted in red

Route information
- Length: 130.0 km (80.8 mi)
- Existed: 18 May 1953–present

Major junctions
- North end: National Route 4 in Aomori, Aomori
- National Route 394; National Route 102; National Route 454; National Route 104; National Route 282; Tōhoku Expressway; National Route 285; Akita Expressway
- South end: National Route 7 in Ōdate, Akita

Location
- Country: Japan

Highway system
- National highways of Japan; Expressways of Japan
| ← National Route 102 | → National Route 104 |

National Route 103 (国道103号, Kokudō Hyakusangō) is a national highway of Japan connecting the capital of Aomori Prefecture, Aomori to Ōdate in northeastern Akita Prefecture. It has a total length of 130.0 km (80.8 mi).

== Route description ==
=== Traveling out of Aomori city ===
The route's northern terminus is an intersection with Japan National Route 4 in the center of the city of Aomori. From here it begins its journey south through the city. Within the urbanized parts of the city it is known as Kankō Dori (Tourism Road). After passing by the headquarters of Michinoku Bank, the highway crosses over the Aoimori Railway Line. It then travels through a heavily commercialized area of the city before reaching an intersection with the Aomori Belt Highway (National Route 7) and the Aomori Expressway. Route 7 serves as a frontage road to the expressway and as an eventual access point to it at Aomori-chūō Interchange.

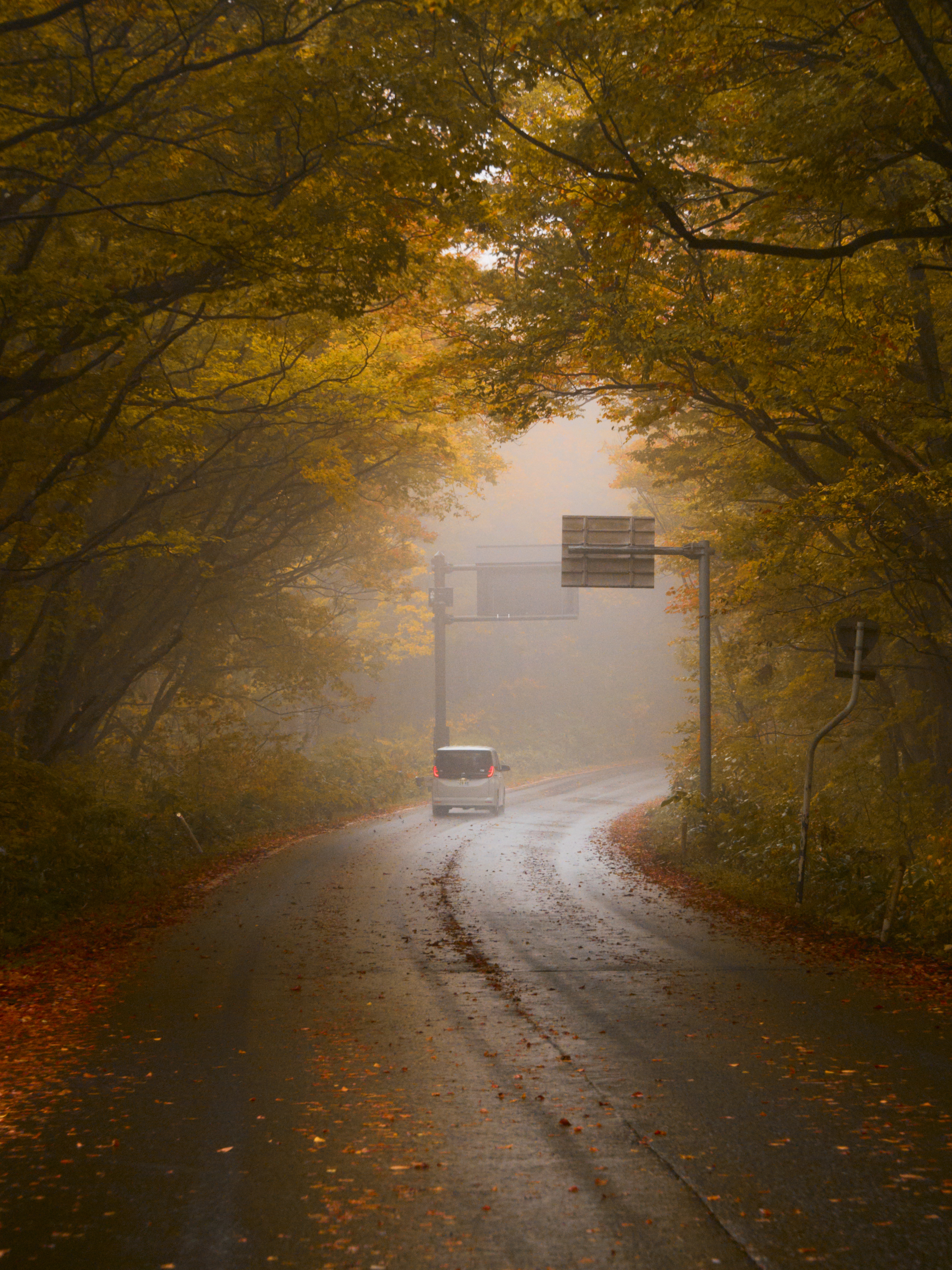
National Route 103 near its junction with Aomori Prefecture Route 40 in the Hakkōda Mountains

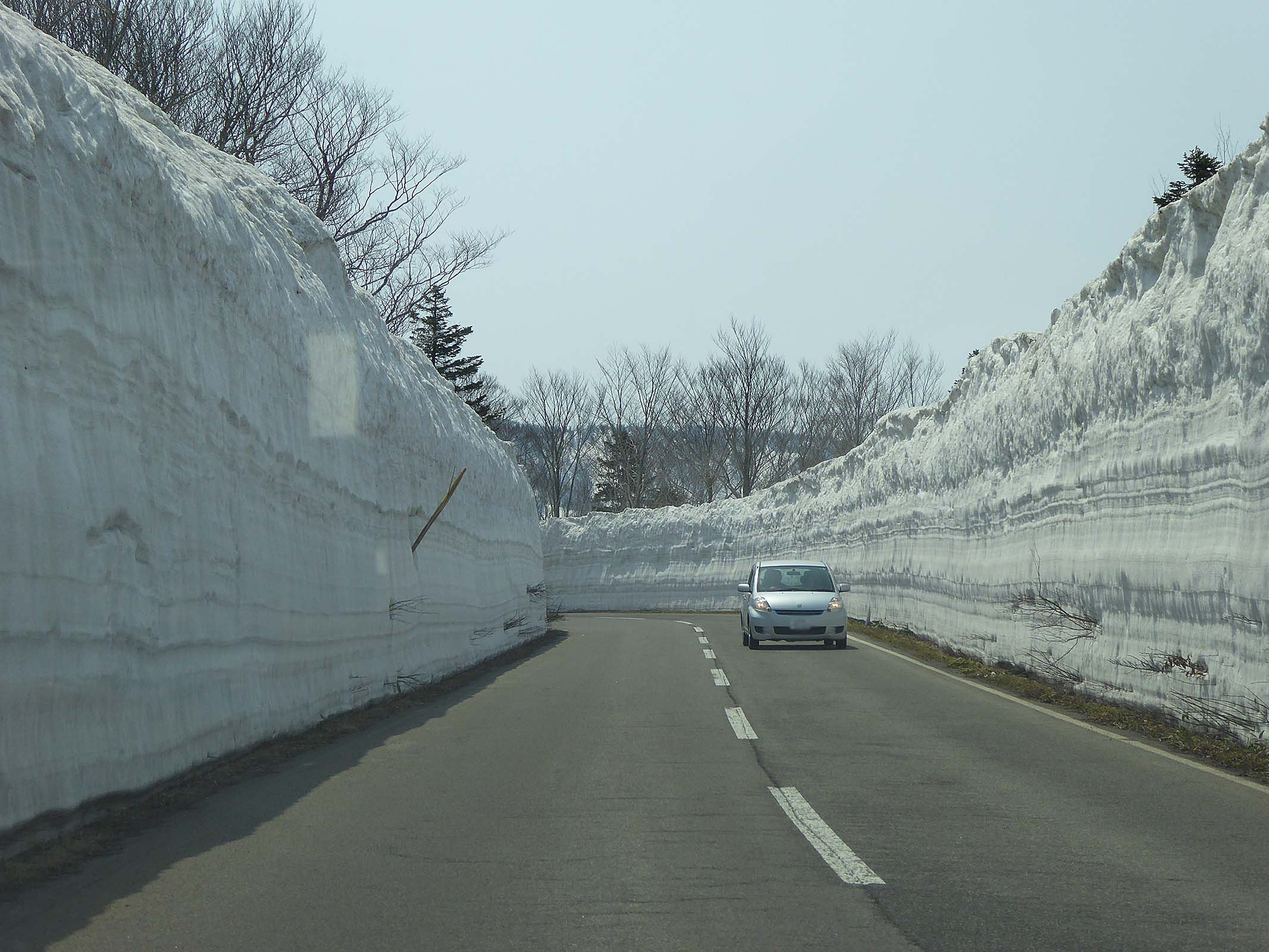
The Hakkōda Gold Line snow corridor near Sukayu Onsen.

Continuing out of the commercial area, the highway passes Aomori Chuo Gakuin University. After passing the institution the road divides with the western route serving as a bypass to the main highway to the east. At this point the highway is known as the Hakkōda Gold Line. After passing through a residential area, the main highway and bypass begin the ascent of the Hakkōda Mountains. The highways merge near Aomori Public University, now known solely as the Hakkōda Gold Line. Continuing its ascent up the mountain the route crosses into Towada-Hachimantai National Park and shortly after, the route meets Aomori Prefecture Route 40, a route that provides access to the nearby memorial of the Hakkōda Mountains incident and then travels southeast to Towada, Aomori. Route 103 winds its way up the mountain where it reaches the Hakkōda Ropeway, a cable car that takes skiers and hikers to the peak of Mount Tamoyachi of the Hakkōda Mountains. After a short descent, the road meets Japan National Route 394 at a signaled intersection. Just a couple of kilometers from here is Sukayu Onsen, the snowiest inhabited place on earth famous for its 1,000 person mixed-use bath. The road continues winding down the mountain in southeasterly path, passing other onsen and resorts along the way. This section of road is closed during the winter, but is reopened in early spring as a "snow corridor" where visitors are allowed to walk. It meets Japan National Route 102 at a junction near the Oirase River. Route 103 begins a concurrency with Route 102 here, traveling to southwest towards Lake Towada, while Route 102's eastbound traffic continues following the river's flow towards the city of Towada.

=== Lake Towada ===
The concurrency follows the Oirase River upstream until it reaches Lake Towada. At the shore of the lake, the concurrency ends with Route 102 forming the northeast and northern parts of a road that circles the lake, while Route 103 forms the eastern and southern part of the road. As the road begins to travel along the southern shore of the lake it meets Japan National Route 454 where the routes form a concurrency. Along the southern part of this circular road, Routes 103 and 454 cross into Akita Prefecture. Continuing along the lake's southern shore, the road meets the western end of the concurrency, Route 454 continues toward Route 102 as the remaining portion of the road to circle the lake while Route 103 begins traveling to the southeast.

=== Akita Prefecture ===
The road meets Japan National Route 104 and turns to the southwest towards Kazuno, Akita. In Kazuno it passes by the Ōyu Stone Circles a Jōmon period site. It continues into the city of Kazuno. In the city it passes under the Tōhoku Expressway and then crosses over the Yoneshiro River where it has a junction with the expressway. The road again crosses the Yoneshiro River several times as it crosses into Ōdate. In Ōdate the road first meets Japan National Route 285, it later has a junction with the Akita Expressway, shortly after the route again meets National Route 7 at Route 103's southern terminus.

== History ==
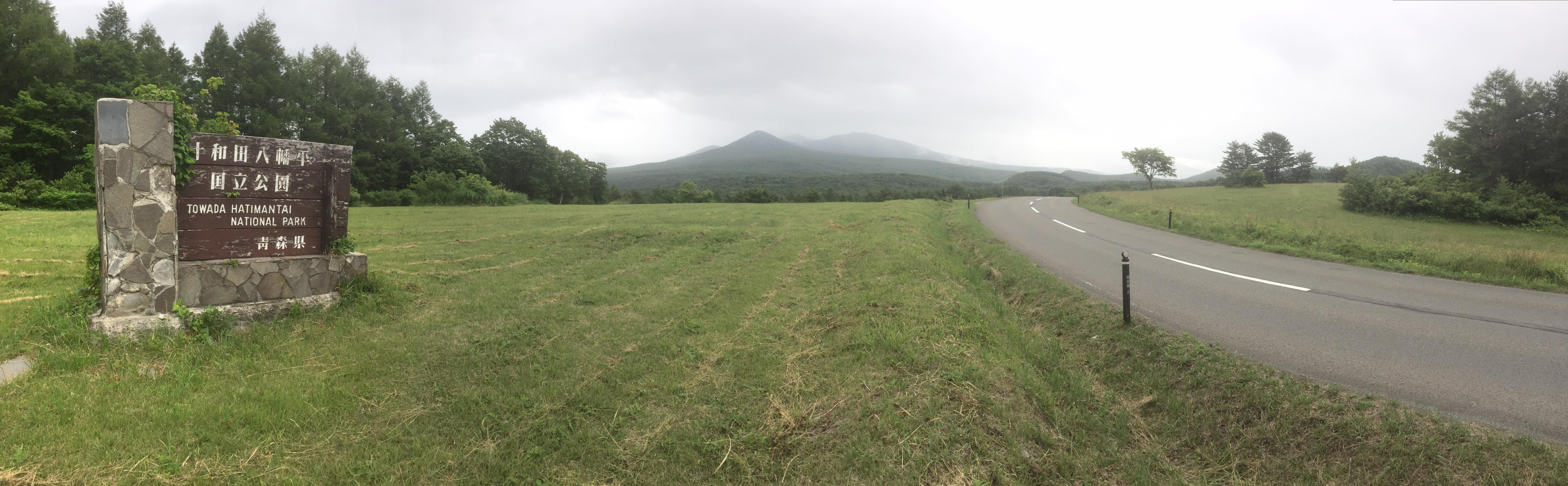
National Route 103's entrance to Towada-Hachimantai National Park with the Hakkōda Mountains in the background.

National Route 103 was established by the Cabinet of Japan between Towadako, Aomori and Ōdate, Akita in 1953. In 1993, the northern terminus of the highway was moved north from Towada to its current location in the city of Aomori.

== List of major junctions ==
All junctions listed are at-grade intersections unless noted otherwise.

| Prefecture | Location | km | mi | Destinations | Notes |
|---|---|---|---|---|---|
| Aomori | Aomori | 0.0 | 0.0 | National Route 4 / National Route 45 –Hirosaki, Shin-Aomori Station, Towada, Noheji | Northern terminus, road continues north as Zeimusho-dori |
| Aomori | Aomori | 3.2 | 2.0 | National Route 7 (Aomori Belt Highway) – Hirosaki, Aomori-chūō, Towada, Noheji | |
| Aomori | Aomori | 5.4 | 3.4 | Aomori Prefecture Route 44 – Fujisaki, Aomori Airport, Towada, Michinoku Toll Road | |
| Aomori | Aomori | 18.0 | 11.2 | Aomori Prefecture Route 40 east – Tashirotai | |
| Aomori | Aomori | 24.9 | 15.5 | National Route 394 south – Jogakura Bridge, Kuroishi, | Northern end of National Route 394 concurrency |
| Aomori | Towada | 35.3 | 21.9 | National Route 394 north – Tashirotai, Shichinohe | Southern end of National Route 394 concurrency |
| Aomori | Towada | 46.6 | 29.0 | National Route 102 east – Towada, National Route 4, Lake Towada, Oirase Gorge | Northern end of National Route 102 concurrency |
| Aomori | Towada | 50.4 | 31.3 | National Route 102 south (Oirase Bypass) – Hirosaki, Kuroishi | |
| Aomori | Towada | 60.3 | 37.5 | National Route 102 west – Hirosaki, Kuroishi, Tōhoku Expressway | Southern end of National Route 102 concurrency |
| Aomori | Towada | 64.2 | 39.9 | National Route 454 east – Gonohe, Mayogatai | Northern end of National Route 454 concurrency |
| Akita | Kazuno | 73.5 | 45.7 | National Route 454 west – Hirosaki, Kuroishi, Okawatai | Southern end of National Route 454 concurrency |
| Akita | Kazuno | 77.0 | 47.8 | Akita Prefecture Route 2 (Jyukai Line) west – Kosaka | |
| Akita | Kazuno | 81.8 | 50.8 | National Route 104 east (Shirahagi Line) – Sannohe | Northern end of unsigned National Route 104 concurrency |
| Akita | Kazuno | 94.3 | 58.6 | Akita Prefecture Route 66 south – Hanawa, Ōyu Stone Circle | |
| Akita | Kazuno | 100.9 | 62.7 | National Route 282 / National Route 285 west – Yuze, Hanawa, Hirakawa, Kosaka, | Eastern terminus of unsigned National Route 285; northern end of unsigned National Route 285 concurrency |
| Akita | Kazuno | 102.0 | 63.4 | Tōhoku Expressway – Aomori, Morioka, Sendai, Hachinohe Expressway | E4 exit 49 (Towada Interchange) |
| Akita | Ōdate | 110.4 | 68.6 | Akita Prefecture Route 66 south – Osarizawa | Interchange |
| Akita | Ōdate | 119.1 | 74.0 | National Route 285 west – Akita, Kitaakita, Odate–Noshiro Airport | Southern end of unsigned National Route 285 concurrency |
| Akita | Ōdate | 126.2 | 78.4 | Akita Prefecture Route 102 – Hinai, Central Ōdate | |
| Akita | Ōdate | 127.5 | 79.2 | Akita Expressway – Kitaakita, Hirosaki, Odate–Noshiro Airport | E7 exit 26 (Ōdate-minami Interchange) |
| Akita | Ōdate | 130.0 | 80.8 | National Route 7 – Noshiro, Kitaakita, Odate–Noshiro Airport, Central Ōdate | Southern terminus; western terminus of unsigned National Route 104 |
1.000 mi = 1.609 km; 1.000 km = 0.621 mi: Concurrency terminus
