= Kuraishi, Aomori =

Kuraishi 倉石村
- Former municipality
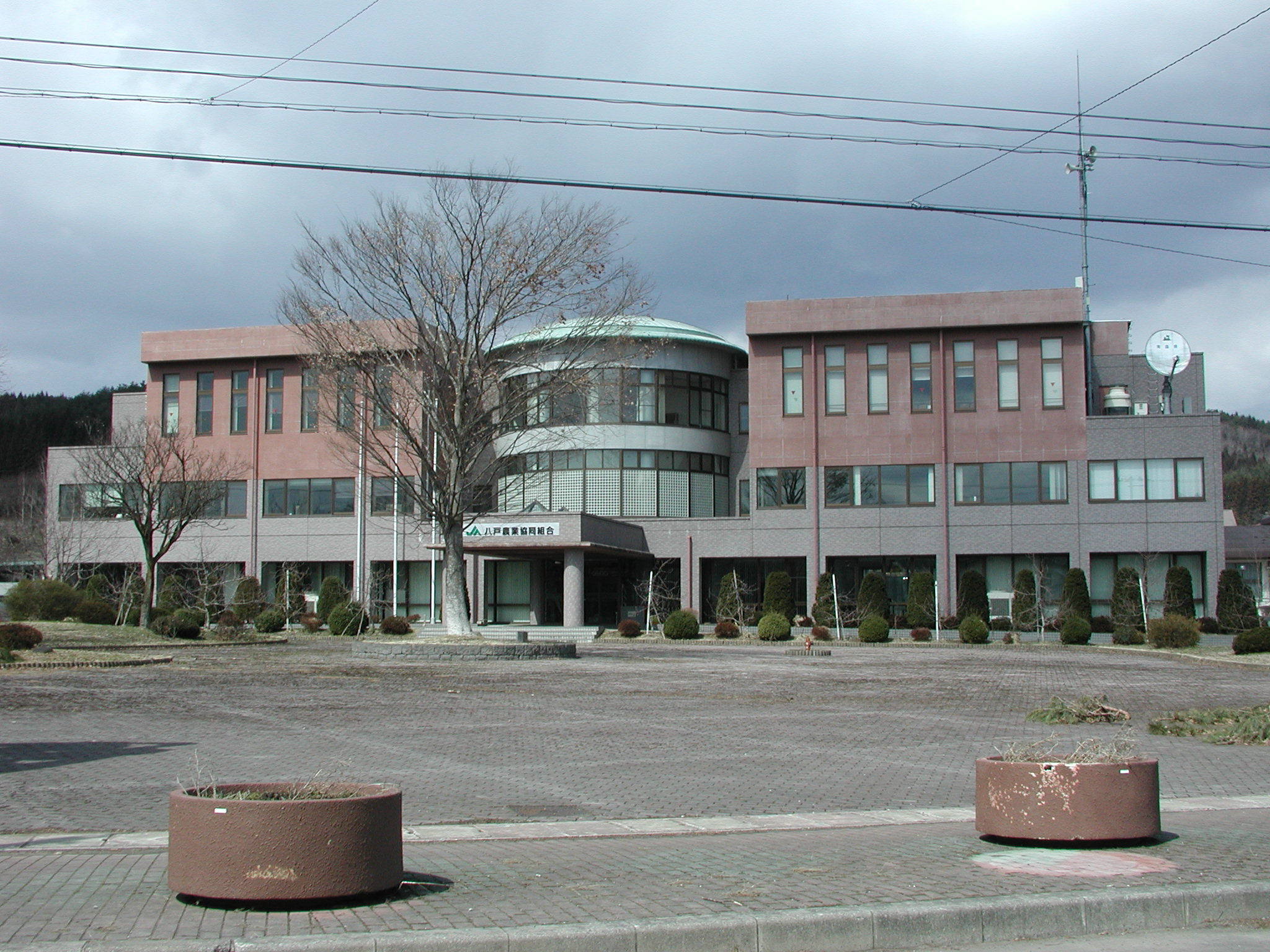
- former Kuraishi Village Hall, now home to Kuraishi branch of JA-Hachinohe agricultural cooperative

- Flag Emblem

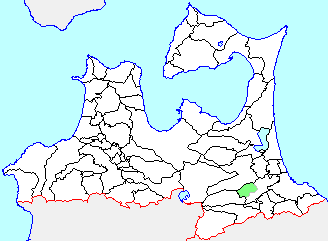
- Location of Kuraishi in Aomori Prefecture

- Location in Japan
- Coordinates: 40°30′21.2″N 141°15′10.1″E
- Country: Japan
- Region: Tōhoku
- Prefecture: Aomori Prefecture
- District: Sannohe
- Merged: July 1, 2004 (now part of Gonohe)

Area
  - Total: 55.68 km^{2} (21.50 sq mi)

Population (July 1, 2004)
  - Total: 3,363
  - Density: 60.4/km^{2} (156/sq mi)
- Time zone: UTC+09:00 (JST)
- Website: https://web.archive.org/web/*/http://www.kuraishimura.com/
- Symbols
- Flower: Kobushi Magnolia
- Tree: Japanese Red Pine

Kuraishi (倉石村, Kuraishi-mura) was a village located in Sannohe District in central Aomori Prefecture, Japan.

Kuraishi Village was founded on April 1, 1889.

On July 1, 2004, Kuraishi was merged into the expanded town of Gonohe, and thus no longer exists as an independent municipality.

An inland village, Kuraishi had an agriculture-based economy and was noted for its production of apples. Today, the former village lends its name to Aomori Kuraishi beef, a branded black-haired wagyu raised in Gonohe.

At the time of its merger, Kuraishi had an estimated population of 3,363 and a population density of 60.4 persons per km^{2}. The total area was 55.68 km^{2}.

Kuraishi was served by Route 454 (Japan) highway, but had no rail service.
