= Japan National Route 284 =

Road in Iwate prefecture, Japan

National Route 284
- 国道284号
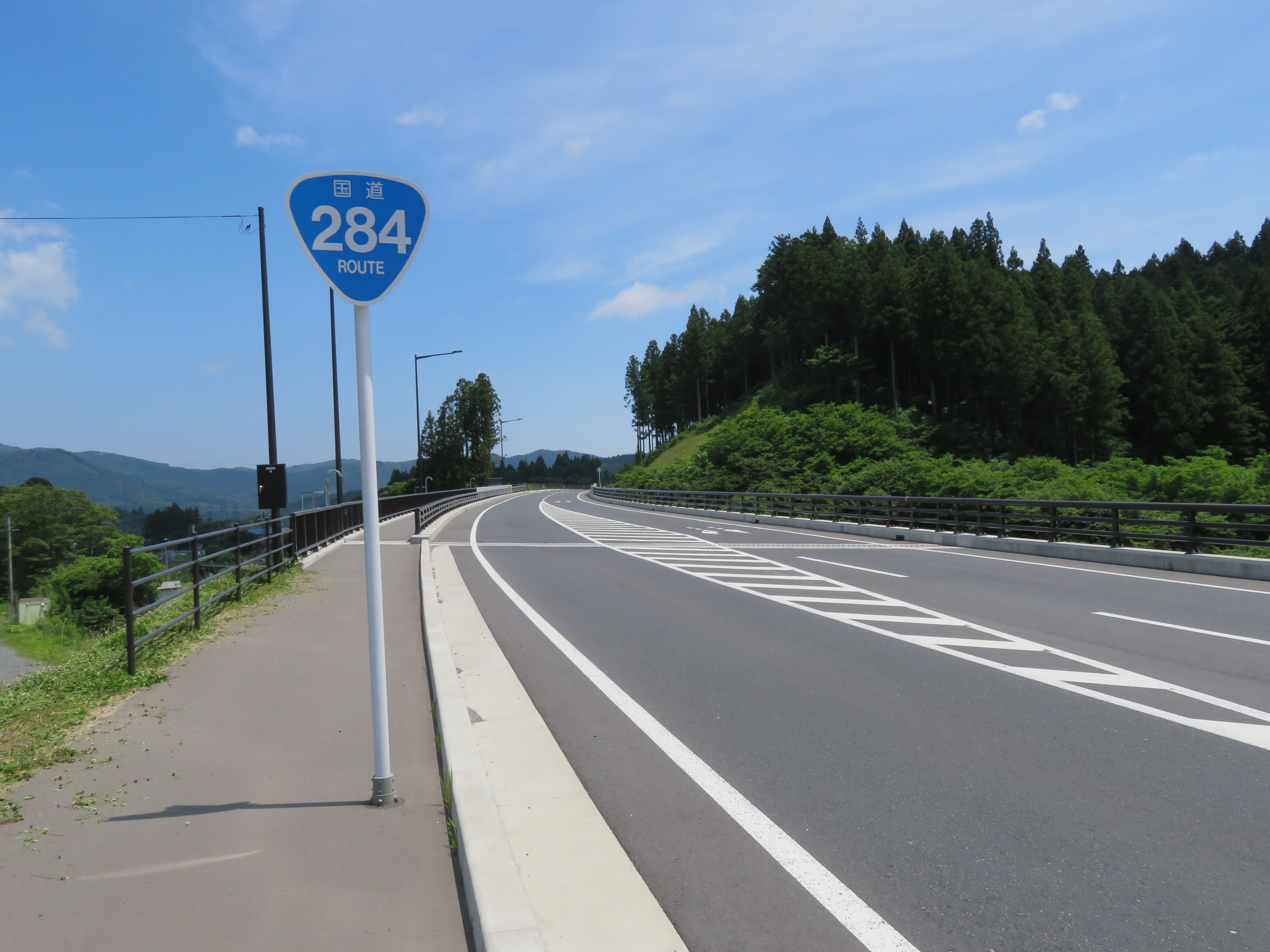

Route information
- Length: 71.9 km (44.7 mi)

Location
- Country: Japan

Highway system
- National highways of Japan; Expressways of Japan
← National Route 283	→ National Route 285

National Route 284 is a national highway of Japan connecting Rikuzentakata, Iwate and Ichinoseki, Iwate in Japan, with a total length of 71.9 km (44.68 mi).
