= Jōgakura Bridge =

Bridge in Aomori Prefecture, Japan

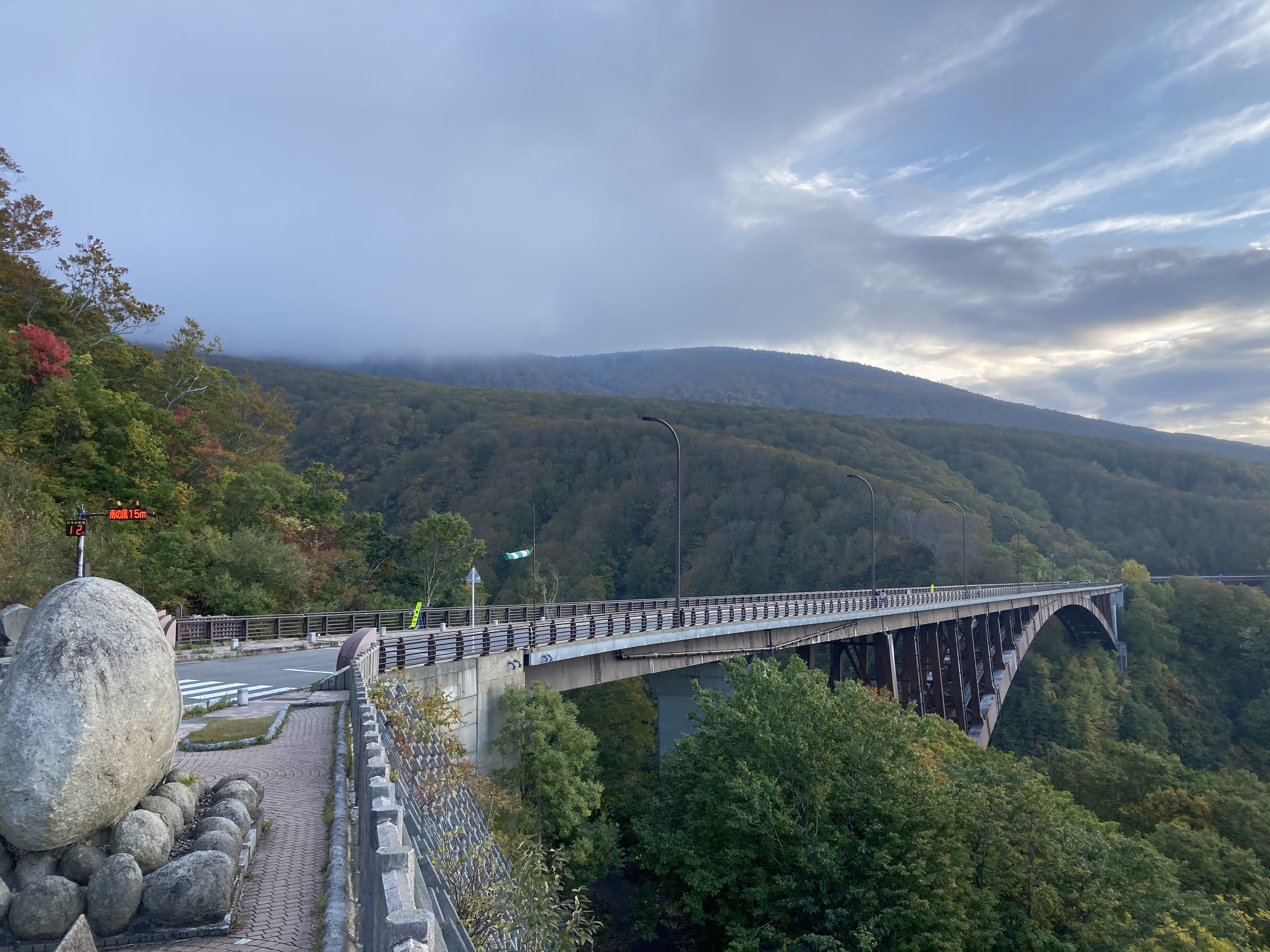
- Jōgakura Bridge seen from the north
- Coordinates: 40°38′59.9″N 140°49′32.9″E
- Carries: National Route 394
- Crosses: Jōgakura Creek
- Locale: Aomori, Aomori Prefecture
- Maintained by: Ministry of Land, Infrastructure, Transport and Tourism

Characteristics
- Design: Deck arch bridge
- Total length: 360 meters (1,180 ft)
- Longest span: 255 meters (837 ft)

History
- Opened: 1995

Location
- Interactive map of Jōgakura Bridge

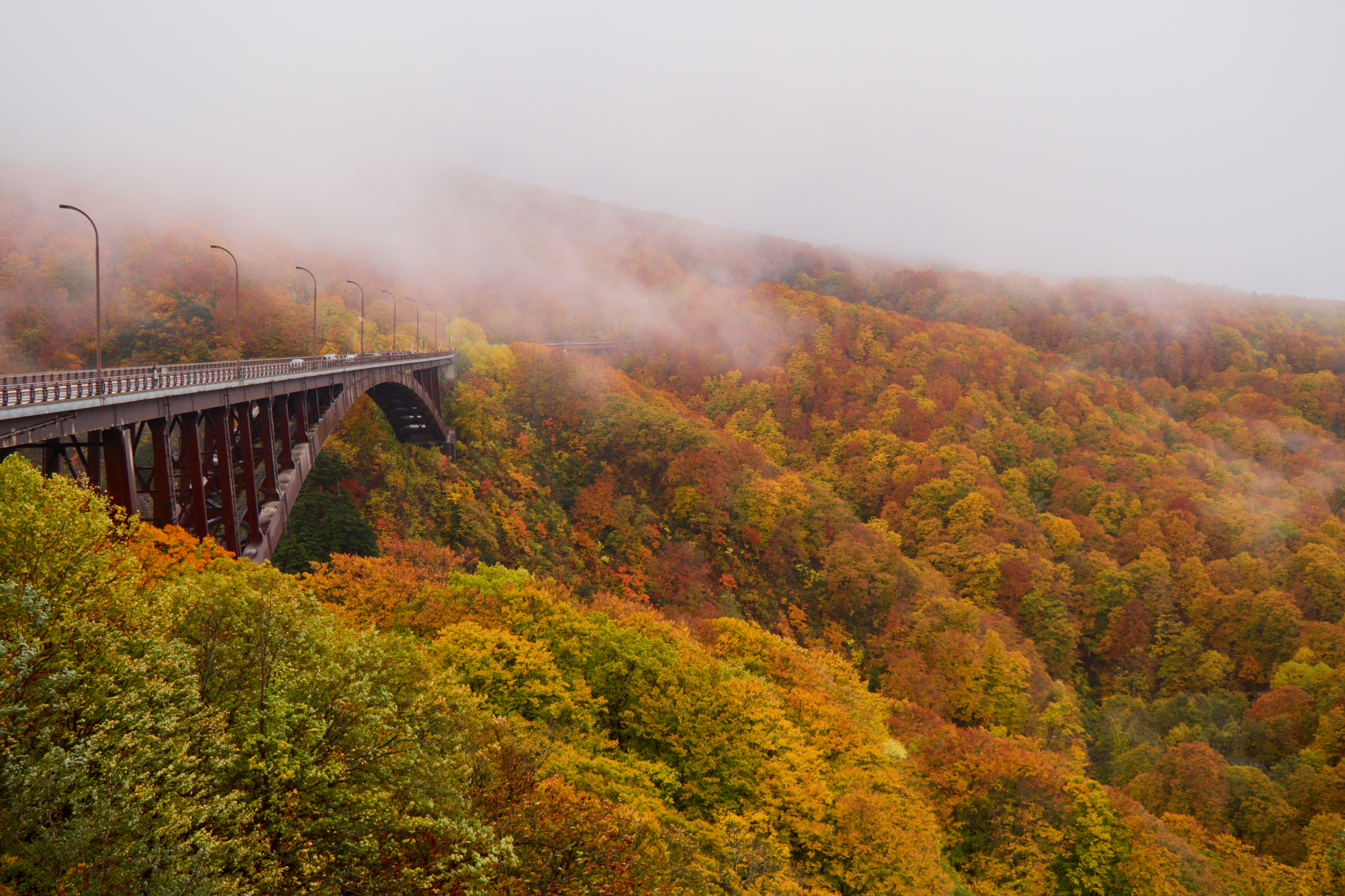
The Jogakura Bridge spanning a forested valley in the Hakkoda Mountains during autumn foliage season.

Jōgakura Bridge (城ヶ倉大橋, Jōgakura-ōhashi) is a 360-meter-long (1,180 ft) deck arch bridge in the southern Hakkōda Mountains in the city of Aomori in Aomori Prefecture, Japan. It carries National Route 394 at a height of 122 meters (400 ft) above Jōgakura Creek. Located inside of Towada-Hachimantai National Park, the bridge is known as being a place for observing the area's scenic beauty as well as being the longest of its type in Japan.

== Description ==
The Jōgakura Bridge is a 360-meter-long (1,180 ft) and 11.5-meter-wide (38 ft) deck arch bridge that carries National Route 394 at a height of 122 meters (400 ft) above Jōgakura Creek. The bridge's main span has a length of 255 meters (837 ft). It is equipped with two meter-wide sidewalks on each side of the bridge. It is the longest deck arch bridge in Japan. The bridge is known as tourist destination because the panoramic views it affords of the Hakkōda Mountains in Towada-Hachimantai National Park. The Jōgakura Bridge becomes especially crowded with tourists when the surrounding Siebold's beech forests begin to change color during autumn.

== History ==
Jōgakura Bridge was opened to traffic on 27 October 1995, replacing an older bridge that was heavily impacted by the rapid deterioration of the columnar jointed andesite rock that it was built on. The total cost of its construction was 87 billion yen.

== Suicides ==
The bridge's height makes it a target for jumpers. In the event of someone jumping from the bridge, the approaches to the bridge are closed to traffic while helicopter teams attempt to recover the jumper from the valley below. Some blame paranormal activity for the suicides, claiming that the bridge and its surroundings are haunted by the spirits of the troops that died in the Hakkōda Mountains incident and that they pull or compel visitors off the bridge, usually at night.
