= Sannohe District, Aomori =

District in Aomori prefecture, Japan

Coordinates: 40°26′13″N 141°19′17″E

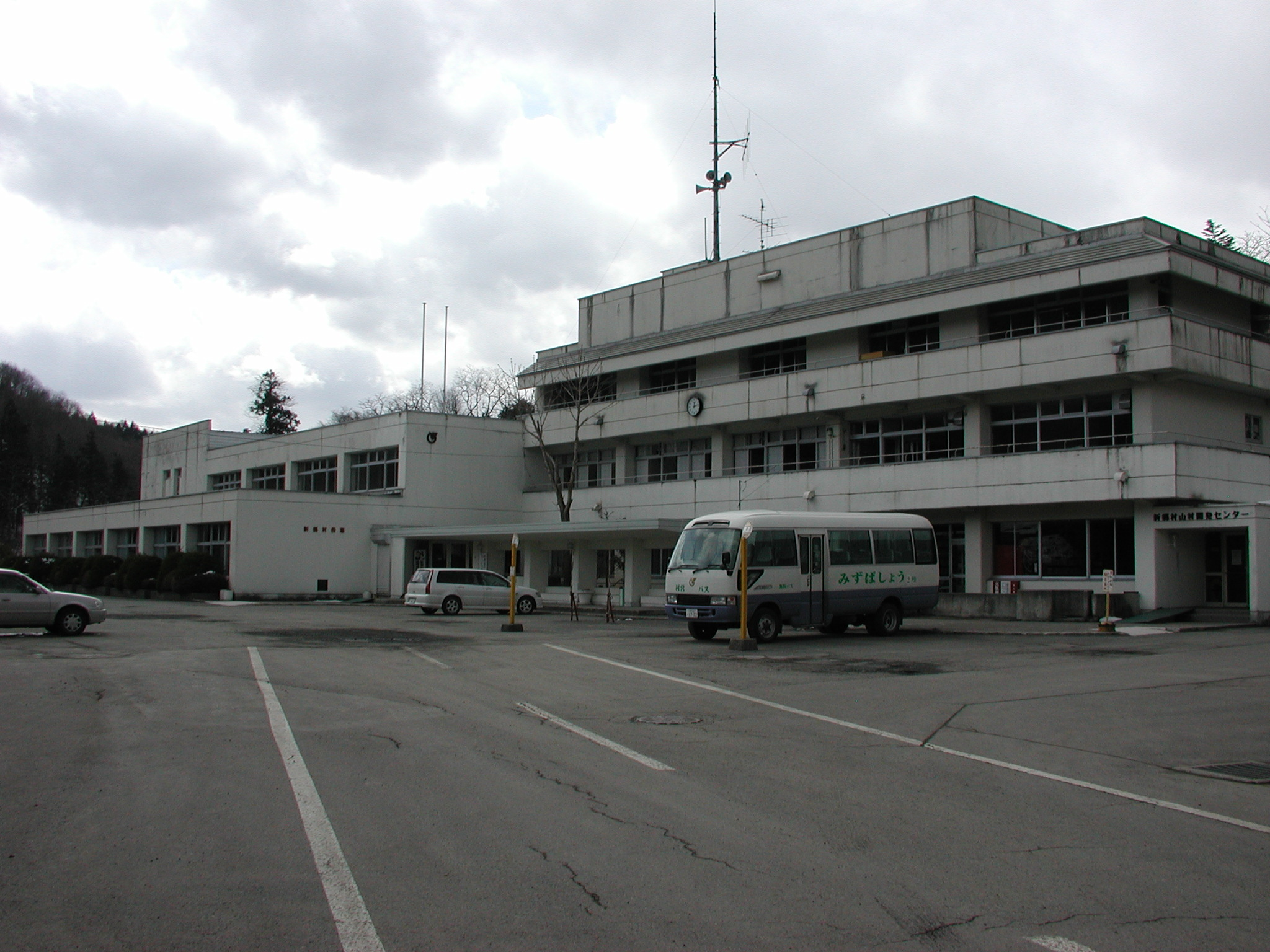
Shingō Village Office

Location of Sannohe District in Aomori Prefecture.

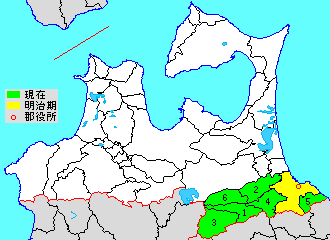
Location of Sannohe-gun, Aomori Prefecture, highlighted in green; with former areas in yellow.

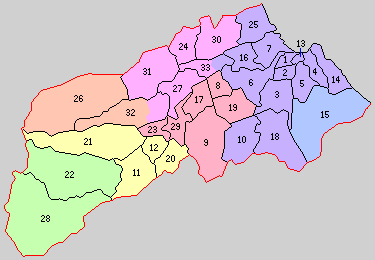
Colored areas are in this district.

Sannohe District (三戸郡, Sannohe-gun) is a district located in Aomori Prefecture, Japan. It occupies the southeast corner of the prefecture, bordering Iwate Prefecture.

As of June 1, 2019, the district has an estimated population of 63,205 and a density of 65.2 persons per km^{2}. The total area was 969.34 km^{2}.

== Politics ==
In terms of national politics, the district is represented in the Diet of Japan's House of Representatives as a part of the Aomori 2nd district.

== Towns and villages ==
The district consists of five towns and one village. The city of Hachinohe was formerly part of the district.

- Gonohe
- Hashikami
- Nanbu
- Sannohe
- Shingō
- Takko

== History ==
During the Edo period, the area was part of the Morioka han feudal domain of the Nanbu clan, with portions belonging to Hachinohe Domain and Shichinohe Domain.

The Nanbu clan sided with the Ōuetsu Reppan Dōmei during the Boshin War of the Meiji Restoration and were punished by the new Meiji government by loss of their northern territories. In November 1869, large portions of Kita-gun (Shimokita and Kamikita) and Sannohe District became part of the newly created Tonami Domain (斗南藩, Tonami-han), a 30,000 koku holding created to resettle the dispossessed Matsudaira clan from Aizu-Wakamatsu. In July 1871, with the abolition of the han system, Tonami Domain became Tonami Prefecture, and was merged into the newly created Aomori Prefecture in September 1871.

During the early Meiji period cadastral reform of April 1, 1889, the district was reorganized into two towns and 31 villages.

=== District Background ===
pre-1889	April 1, 1889	1889 - 1949	1950- 1989		1989–present	present		
	Hachinohe-machi	July 1, 1901; Hachinohe-machi	May 1, 1929; Hachinohe-shi	Hachinohe-shi	Hachinohe-shi	Hachinohe-shi	Hachinohe-shi	Hachinohe
	Choja-mura	July 1, 1901; Hachinohe-machi	May 1, 1929; Hachinohe-shi	Hachinohe-shi	Hachinohe-shi	Hachinohe-shi	Hachinohe-shi	Hachinohe
	Konakano-mura	November 10, 1924; Konakano-machi	May 1, 1929; Hachinohe-shi	Hachinohe-shi	Hachinohe-shi	Hachinohe-shi	Hachinohe-shi	Hachinohe
	Minato-mura	November 10, 1924; Minato-machi	May 1, 1929; Hachinohe-shi	Hachinohe-shi	Hachinohe-shi	Hachinohe-shi	Hachinohe-shi	Hachinohe
	Same-mura	Same-mura	May 1, 1929; Hachinohe-shi	Hachinohe-shi	Hachinohe-shi	Hachinohe-shi	Hachinohe-shi	Hachinohe
	Shimonaganawashiro-mura	Shimonaganawashiro-mura	April 1, 1942 merged with Hachinohe-shi	Hachinohe-shi	Hachinohe-shi	Hachinohe-shi	Hachinohe-shi	Hachinohe
	Korekawa-mura	Korekawa-mura	Korekawa-mura	December 1, 1954 merged with Hachinohe-shi	Hachinohe-shi	Hachinohe-shi	Hachinohe-shi	Hachinohe
	Ichikawa-mura	Ichikawa-mura	Ichikawa-mura	Ichikawa-mura	April 1, 1955 merged with Hachinohe-shi	Hachinohe-shi	Hachinohe-shi	Hachinohe
	Tachi-mura	Tachi-mura	Tachi-mura	Tachi-mura	April 1, 1955 merged with Hachinohe-shi	Hachinohe-shi	Hachinohe-shi	Hachinohe
	Kaminaganawashiro-mura	Kaminaganawashiro-mura	Kaminaganawashiro-mura	Kaminaganawashiro-mura	April 1, 1955 merged with Hachinohe-shi	Hachinohe-shi	Hachinohe-shi	Hachinohe
	Toyosaki-mura	Toyosaki-mura	Toyosaki-mura	Toyosaki-mura	October 20, 1955 merged with Hachinohe-shi	Hachinohe-shi	Hachinohe-shi	Hachinohe
	Odate-mura	Odate-mura	Odate-mura	Odate-mura	September 10, 1958 merged with Hachinohe-shi	Hachinohe-shi	Hachinohe-shi	Hachinohe
	Shimamori-mura	Shimamori-mura	Shimamori-mura	Shimamori-mura	March 31, 1957; Nango-mura		March 31, 2005 merged with Hachinohe-shi	Hachinohe
	Nakazawa-mura	Nakazawa-mura	Nakazawa-mura	Nakazawa-mura	March 31, 1957; Nango-mura		March 31, 2005 merged with Hachinohe-shi	Hachinohe
	Hashikami-mura	Hashikami-mura	Hashikami-mura	Hashikami-mura	May 1, 1980; Hashikami-machi		Hashigami-machi	Hashigami-machi
	Tanabe-mura	Tanabe-mura	Tanabe-mura	Tanabe-mura	April 1, 1955; Fukuchi-mura		January 1, 2006; Nambu-machi	Nambu-machi
	Jibiki-mura	Jibiki-mura	Jibiki-mura	Jibiki-mura	April 1, 1955; Fukuchi-mura		January 1, 2006; Nambu-machi	Nambu-machi
	Nakui-mura	Nakui-mura	Nakui-mura	Nakui-mura	July 20, 1955; Naku-machi		January 1, 2006; Nambu-machi	Nambu-machi
	Kitagawa-mura	Kitagawa-mura	Kitagawa-mura	Kitagawa-mura	July 20, 1955; Naku-machi		January 1, 2006; Nambu-machi	Nambu-machi
	Hirasaki-mura	Hirasaki-mura	Hirasaki-mura	Hirasaki-mura	April 20, 1955; Nanbu-mura	February 11, 1959; Nanbu-machi	January 1, 2006; Nambu-machi	Nambu-machi
	Muko-mura	Muko-mura	Muko-mura	Muko-mura	April 20, 1955; Nanbu-mura	February 11, 1959; Nanbu-machi	January 1, 2006; Nambu-machi	Nambu-machi
	Kuraishi-mura	Kuraishi-mura	Kuraishi-mura	Kuraishi-mura	Kuraishi-mura		July 1, 2004 merged with Gonohe-machi	Gonohe-machi
	Gonohe-mura	November 1, 1915; Gonohe-machi	Gonohe-machi	Gonohe-machi	July 1, 1955; Gonohe-machi	Gonohe-machi	Gonohe-machi	Gonohe-machi
	Kawauchi-mura	Kawauchi-mura	Kawauchi-mura	Kawauchi-mura	July 1, 1955; Gonohe-machi	Gonohe-machi	Gonohe-machi	Gonohe-machi
	Asada-mura	Asada-mura	Asada-mura	Asada-mura	July 1, 1955; Gonohe-machi	Gonohe-machi	Gonohe-machi	Gonohe-machi
	Nozawa-mura	Nozawa-mura	Nozawa-mura	Nozawa-mura	July 29, 1955 merged with Gonohe-machi (Tekurabashi)	Gonohe-machi	Gonohe-machi	Gonohe-machi
	Nozawa-mura	Nozawa-mura	Nozawa-mura	Nozawa-mura	July 29, 1955; Shingo-mura (Nishikoshi)	Shingo-mura	Shingo-mura	Shingo-mura
	Herai-mura	Herai-mura	Herai-mura	Herai-mura	July 29, 1955; Shingo-mura	Shingo-mura	Shingo-mura	Shingo-mura
	Sannohe-machi	Sannohe-machi	Sannohe-machi	Sannohe-machi	March 20, 1955; Sannohe-machi		Sannohe-machi	Sannohe-machi
	Sarube-mura	Sarube-mura	Sarube-mura	Sarube-mura	March 20, 1955; Sannohe-machi		Sannohe-machi	Sannohe-machi
	Tonai-mura	Tonai-mura	Tonai-mura	Tonai-mura	March 20, 1955; Sannohe-machi		Sannohe-machi	Sannohe-machi
	Tomesaki-mura	Tomesaki-mura	Tomesaki-mura	Tomesaki-mura	March 20, 1955; Sannohe-machi		Sannohe-machi	Sannohe-machi
	Takko-mura	Takko-mura	November 10, 1928; Takko-machi	Takko-machi	March 1, 1955; Takko-machi		Takko-machi	Takko-machi
	Kamigo-mura	Kamigo-mura	Kamigo-mura	Kamigo-mura	March 1, 1955; Takko-machi		Takko-machi	Takko-machi

=== Recent mergers ===
- On July 1, 2004 - The village of Kuraishi was merged into the expanded town of Gonohe.
- On March 31, 2005 - The village of Nangō was merged into the expanded city of Hachinohe.
- On January 1, 2006 - The town of Nagawa and the village of Fukuchi were merged into the expanded town of Nanbu.
