= Japan National Route 394 =

National highway in Japan

National Route 394
- 国道394号
- Japan National Route 394 highlighted in red
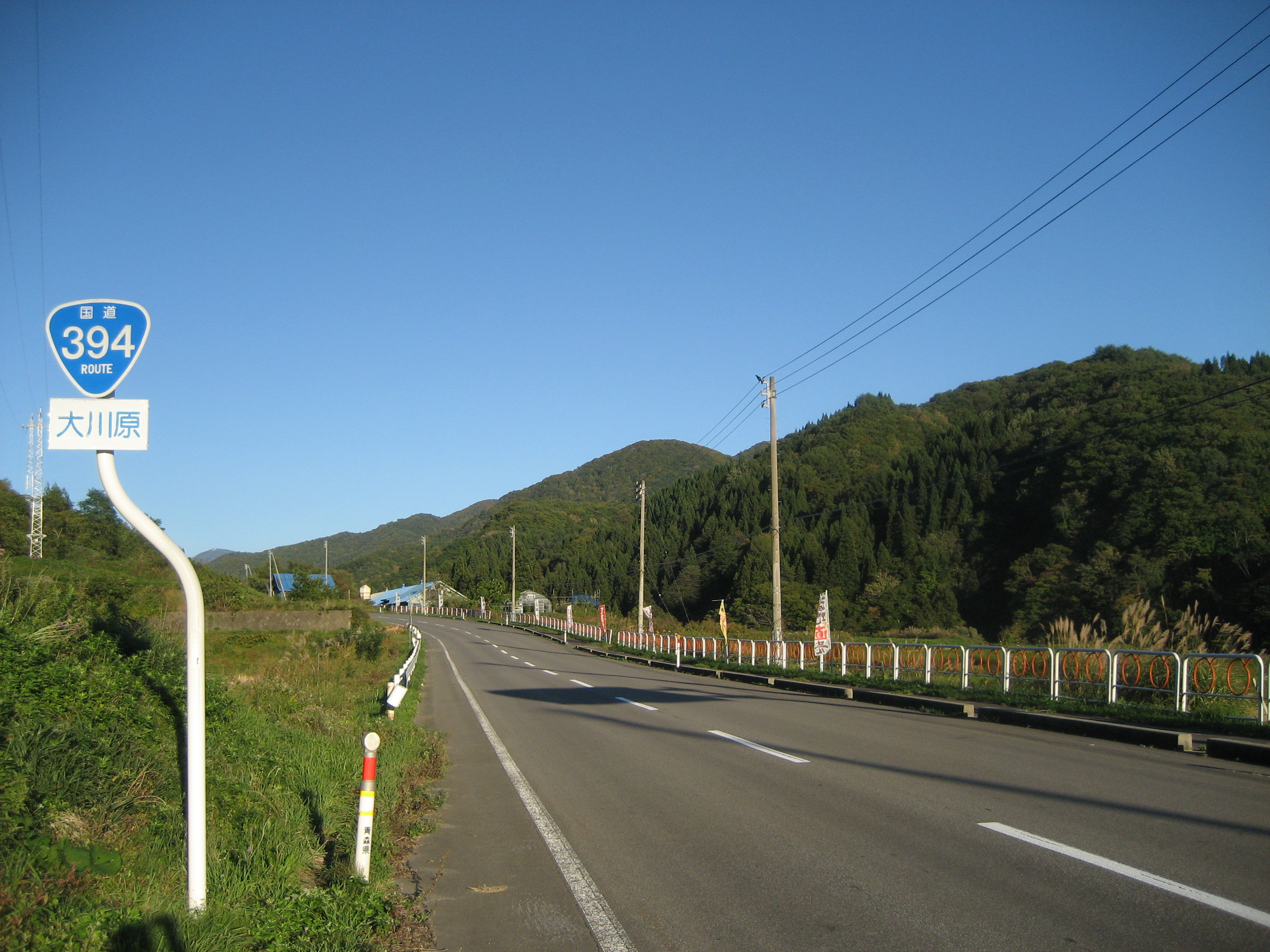

Route information
- Length: 185.0 km (115.0 mi)
- Existed: 1 April 1982–present

Major junctions
- North end: National Route 279 in Mutsu, Aomori
- National Route 338; Shimokita Expressway; Kamikita Expressway; National Route 4; National Route 103; National Route 102
- South end: National Route 7 in Hirosaki, Aomori

Location
- Country: Japan

Highway system
- National highways of Japan; Expressways of Japan
← National Route 393	→ National Route 395

National Route 394 (国道394号, Kokudō San hyaku kyū jūyongō) is a national highway in the Japanese prefecture of Aomori. Route 394 stretches 185 km (115 miles) from National Routes 279 and 338 in Mutsu southwest to National Route 7 in Hirosaki.

== Route description ==
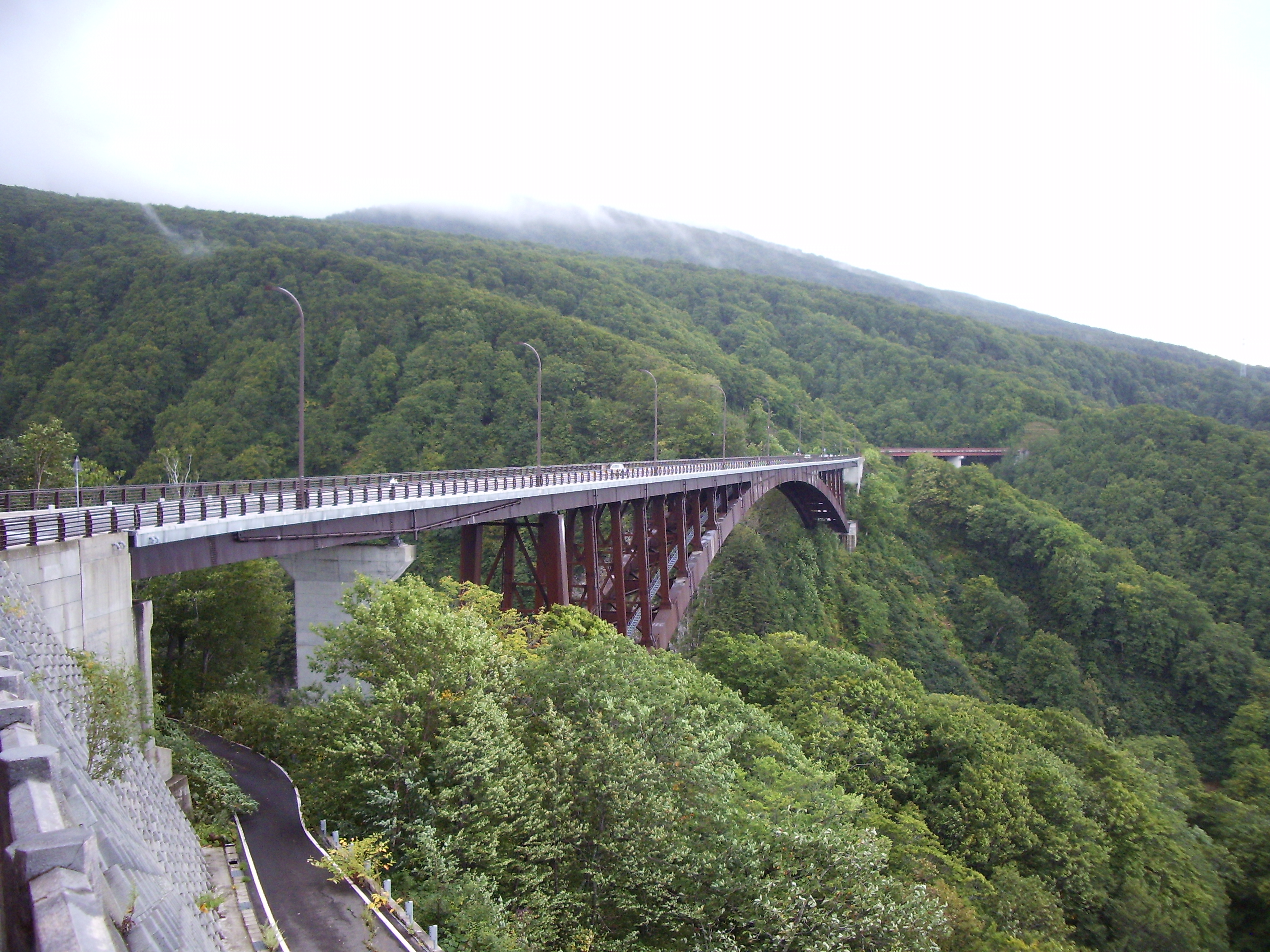
Jōgakura Bridge on National Route 394 is a popular place in Aomori to look at the forest scenery of the Hakkōda Mountains

The route has a total length of 185 km (114.95 mi). It travels southwest across Aomori Prefecture connecting the cities of Mutsu and Hirosaki by traveling over the Hakkōda Mountains in the center of the prefecture.

== History ==
National Route 394 was designated as route connecting Mutsu to Aomori in 1982; however, many of the sections of roadway that make up the highway predate this designation, including a bridge along the highway over Lake Ogawara that was built in 1958. Its routing has changed since its designation. In Shichinohe, the road used to parallel National Route 4 and National Route 45 for a short distance until March 2015. In the same town on 27 November 2018, the route was moved slightly to the west to better facilitate the junction between it and the Kamikita Expressway.

== Future ==
Improvements on the highway near the interchange with the Kamikita Expressway continue. A project to straighten a 1.9-kilometer-long (1.2 mi) section of the road north of the junction is planned by the government of Aomori Prefecture.

== Major junctions and features ==
The route lies entirely within Aomori Prefecture. Distance markers reflect distance traveled from the junction with National Route 338 in Rokkasho.

Location	km	mi	Destinations	Notes
Mutsu			National Route 279 / National Route 338 north	Northern terminus; northern end of unsigned National Route 338 concurrency
See National Route 338
Rokkasho	0	0.0	National Route 338 south	Southern end of unsigned National Route 338 concurrency; beginning of distance markers
Shichinohe	24.5	15.2	Kamikita Expressway east	Current western terminus of the Kamikita Expressway
Shichinohe	29.7	18.5	National Route 4 / National Route 45	National Route 45 is unsigned
Aomori	54.0	33.6	Aomori Prefecture Route 40 (Aomori-Tashiro-Towada route)	
Towada	60.4	37.5	National Route 103 south	Northern end of National Route 103 concurrency
Aomori	70.8	44.0	National Route 103 north	Southern end of National Route 103 concurrency
Aomori	71.4– 71.8	44.4– 44.6	Jōgakura Bridge	
Kuroishi	87.9	54.6	National Route 102 east	Northern end of National Route 102 concurrency (National Route 394 is unsigned)
Kuroishi	94.2	58.5	Tōhoku Expressway– Morioka, Aomori	Interchange; Tōhoku Expressway exit 52
Hirosaki	103.5	64.3	National Route 7	Interchange; southern end of National Route 102 concurrency; southern terminus
1.000 mi = 1.609 km; 1.000 km = 0.621 mi: Concurrency terminus
