= Japan National Route 454 =

National highway of Japan

National Route 454
- 国道454号
- Japan National Route 454 highlighted in red

Route information
- Length: 102.1 km (63.4 mi)
- Existed: 1993–present

Major junctions
- East end: National Route 104 in Hachinohe
- National Route 4; Hachinohe Expressway; National Route 103; National Route 102
- West end: National Route 7 in Ōwani

Location
- Country: Japan

Highway system
- National highways of Japan; Expressways of Japan
← National Route 453	→ National Route 455

National Route 454 (国道454号, Kokudō Yonhyaku go-juyongō) is a national highway of Japan that traverses southern Aomori Prefecture and briefly crosses into the northeastern edge of Akita before returning in to Aomori. It connects Hachinohe in eastern Aomori to Ōwani in the western part of the prefecture.

== Route description ==
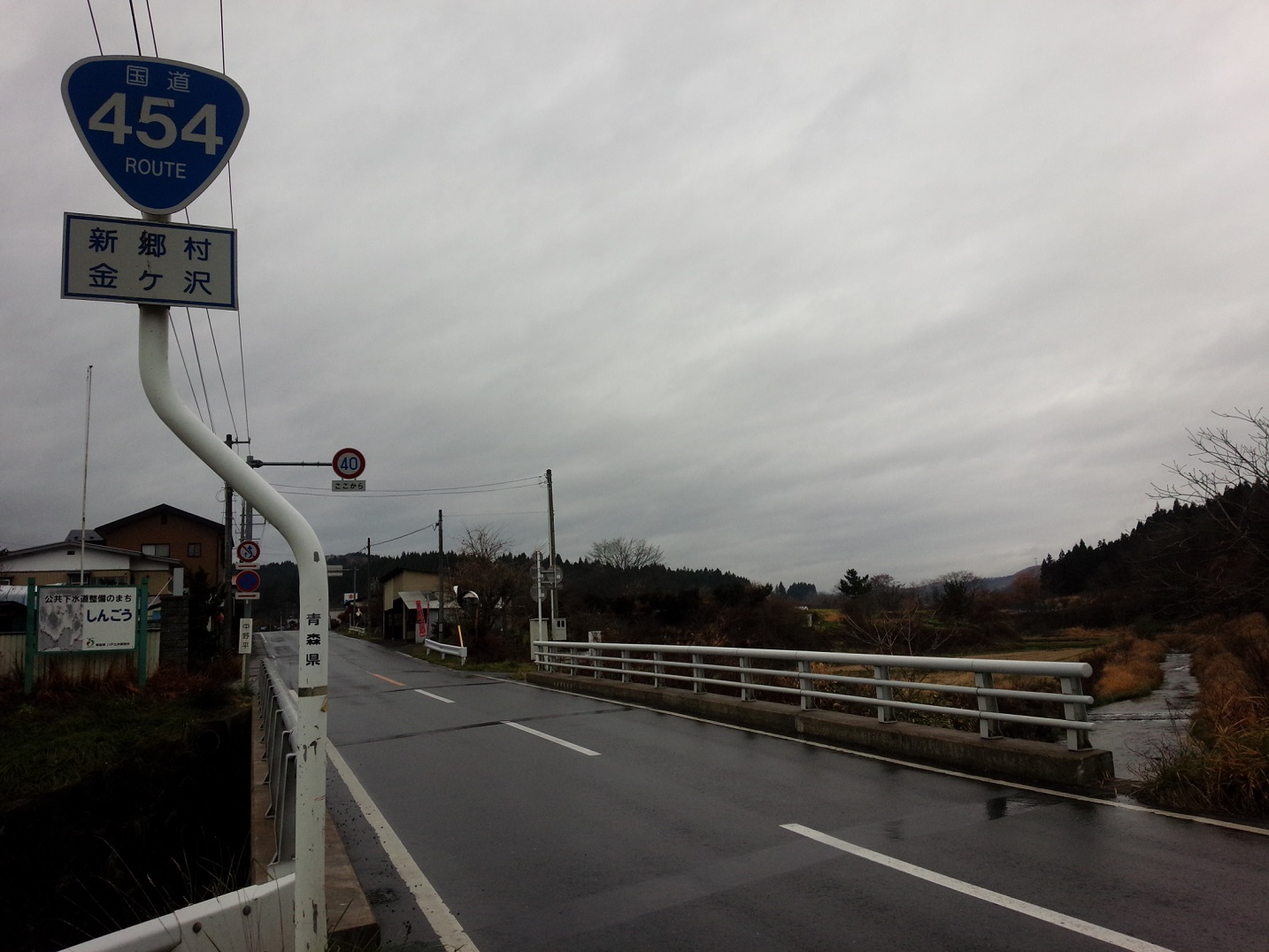
National Route 454 in Shingō

National Route 454 begins at an intersection with National Route 104 near the central district of Hachinohe in eastern Aomori Prefecture. From there, the highway travels through the city headed west. It has a junction with the branch route of the Hachinohe Expressway that is accessible only if drivers have electronic toll collection enabled. Continuing west to the town of Gonohe, the road runs concurrently with National Route 4 for about four kilometers traveling north. After departing the concurrency heading west once again the road enters the village of Shingō, then crosses into Akita Prefecture. Curving to the north, the road reaches the southern shore of Lake Towada and reenters Aomori Prefecture where it shares a concurrency with National Route 103 as the roads travel west along the shore of the lake. The concurrency enters Akita Prefecture once again before National Route 103 leaves the concurrency, heading southwest while National Route 454 continues north along the western shore. Upon reaching the northern shore of the lake, the route enters Aomori Prefecture once more and has a junction with National Route 102 immediately after. At the junction the routes merge, sharing a concurrency traveling northwest away from the lake. After about fifteen kilometers together, the routes separate, with National Route 454 heading southwest through Hirakawa. The road crosses into Ōwani where it terminates upon meeting National Route 7.

== History ==
National Route 454 was established by the Cabinet of Japan along its current route in April 1993.

== Major intersections ==
All junctions listed are at-grade intersections unless noted otherwise.

Prefecture	Location	km	mi	Destinations	Notes
Aomori	Hachinohe	0.0	0.0	National Route 104 (Shirahagi Line) – to National Route 45, Towada, Nanbu, City Office, Hachinohe Portal Museum; Aomori Prefecture Route 19 north – Ferry Wharf, Misawa	Eastern terminus; road continues as Aomori Prefecture Route 19
Aomori	Hachinohe	2.4	1.5	Aomori Prefecture Route 20 south – Nanbu, Hachinohe Station (East exit)	Eastern end of Aomori Prefecture Route 20 concurrency
Aomori	Hachinohe	4.1	2.5	Aomori Prefecture Route 20 north – Rokunohe	Western end of Aomori Prefecture Route 20 concurrency
Aomori	Hachinohe	5.0	3.1	Hachinohe Expressway (branch route) – Misawa, Morioka	E4A exit 5-2 (Hachinohe-nishi Smart Interchange) (electronic payment only)
Aomori	Gonohe	11.4	7.1	Aomori Prefecture Route 214 – Nanbu, Central Gonohe	
Aomori	Gonohe	14.7	9.1	National Route 4 south – Morioka, Nanbu	Eastern end of National Route 4 concurrency
Aomori	Gonohe	17.7	11.0	Aomori Prefecture Route 15 – Gonohe Town Office, Shingō	Interchange
Aomori	Gonohe	19.1	11.9	National Route 4 north – Aomori, Towada	Western end of National Route 4 concurrency; interchange
Aomori	Gonohe	25.6	15.9	Aomori Prefecture Route 142 east – Asamizu	
Aomori	Shingō	30.4	18.9	Aomori Prefecture Route 145 north – Towada	
Aomori	Shingō	31.0	19.3	Aomori Prefecture Route 45 south – Sannohe, Shingō Village Office	Eastern end of Aomori Prefecture Route 45 concurrency
Aomori	Shingō	35.9	22.3	Aomori Prefecture Route 45 north – Kawadai	Western end of Aomori Prefecture Route 45 concurrency
Aomori	Shingō	36.6	22.7	Aomori Prefecture Route 218 (Green Road) east – Yokosawa	
Aomori	Shingō	39.3	24.4	Aomori Prefecture Route 216 east – Sannohe	
Aomori	Shingō	42.2	26.2	Aomori Prefecture Route 21 south – to National Route 104, Takko	
Akita	Kazuno	43.5	27.0	Akita Prefecture Route 128 south – Ōdate	
Aomori	Towada	50.9	31.6	National Route 103 north – Aomori, Nenokuchi	Eastern end of National Route 103 concurrency
Akita	Kosaka	60.2	37.4	National Route 103 south – to Tōhoku Expressway, Ōdate, Kazuno, Hachimantai	Western end of National Route 103 concurrency
Aomori	Hirakawa	73.0	45.4	National Route 102 east – Towada, Nenokuchi	Eastern end of National Route 102 concurrency
Aomori	Hirakawa	89.5	55.6	National Route 102 west – to Tōhoku Expressway, Hirosaki	Western end of National Route 102 concurrency
Aomori	Hirakawa	91.5	56.9	Aomori Prefecture Route 282 west	
Aomori	Ōwani	102.1	63.4	National Route 7 – Ōdate, Hirakawa, Aomori, Hirosaki	Western terminus
1.000 mi = 1.609 km; 1.000 km = 0.621 mi: Concurrency terminus; Electronic toll collection
