= Shingō, Aomori =

Shingō 新郷村
- Village
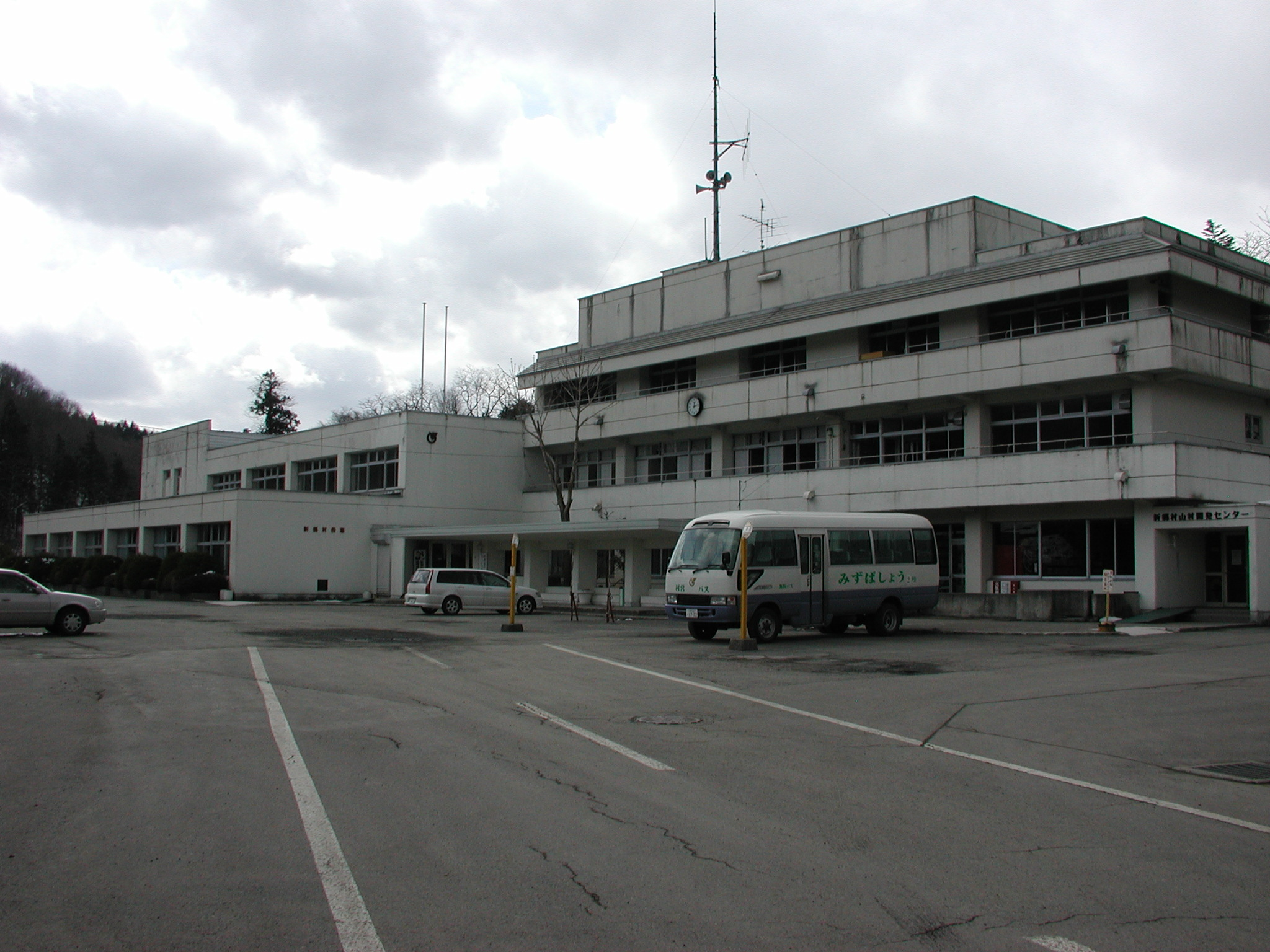
- Shingō Village Office

- Flag Seal
- Location of Shingō in Aomori Prefecture

- Coordinates: 40°27′57″N 141°10′24″E
- Country: Japan
- Region: Tōhoku
- Prefecture: Aomori
- District: Sannohe

Area
  - Total: 150.77 km^{2} (58.21 sq mi)

Population (31 December 2025)
  - Total: 1,965
  - Density: 13.03/km^{2} (33.76/sq mi)
- Time zone: UTC+9 (Japan Standard Time)
- Phone number: 0178-78-2111
- Address: 039-0801
- Website: Official website
- Symbols
- Flower: Asian skunk cabbage
- Tree: Japanese horse chestnut

Shingō (新郷村, Shingō-mura) is a village located in Aomori Prefecture, Japan. As of 28 February 2023, the village has an estimated population of 1,965 in 869 households and a population density of 13 persons per km^{2}. The total area of the village is 150.77 square kilometres (58.21 sq mi).

== Geography ==
Shingō is in south-central Aomori Prefecture, east of Lake Towada. The western edge of the village borders Akita Prefecture. Much of the village is mountainous with the outer ring mountains of Lake Towada, including Mt. Okomagatake (1,144 metres (3,753 ft)) and Mt. Toraidake (1,159 m (3,802 ft)). The village area extends along National Route 454, which connects Hachinohe, Aomori Prefecture and Lake Towada.

=== Neighboring municipalities ===
Aomori Prefecture

- Sannohe District
  - Gonohe
  - Nanbu
  - Sannohe
- Towada

Akita Prefecture

- Kazuno

=== Climate ===
The village has a cold humid continental climate characterized by cool short summers and long cold winters with very heavy snowfall (Köppen climate classification Dfa). The average annual temperature in Shingō is 8.7 °C (47.7 °F). The average annual rainfall is 1,342 mm (52.8 in), with September as the wettest month. The temperatures are highest on average in August, at around 22.2 °C (72.0 °F), and lowest in January, at around −3.7 °C (25.3 °F).

== Demographics ==
Per Japanese census data, the population of Shingō has declined steadily over the past 70 years.

Historical population
Year	Pop.	±% p.a.
1950	6,411	—
1960	6,409	−0.00%
1970	4,754	−2.94%
1980	4,332	−0.93%
1990	3,724	−1.50%
2000	3,343	−1.07%
2010	2,851	−1.58%
2020	2,197	−2.57%

== History ==
The area around Shingō was controlled by the Nanbu clan of Morioka Domain during the Edo period. During the post-Meiji Restoration establishment of the modern municipalities system on 1 April 1889, Herai Village and neighboring Nozawa Village were formed. On 29 July 1955, the western portion of Nozawa Village merged into Herai, which was then renamed Shingō.

== Government ==
Shingō has a mayor-council form of government with a directly elected mayor and a unicameral village council of eight members. Shingō is part of Sannohe District which contributes three members to the Aomori Prefectural Assembly. In terms of national politics, the village is part of Aomori 2nd district of the House of Representatives of the National Diet.

== Education ==
Shingō has one public elementary school, one public middle school, and a preschool operated by the village government. The village does not have a high school.

== Economy ==
The economy of Shingō is heavily dependent on agriculture and tourism. Notable crops include garlic, edible chrysanthemum, Japanese yam and tobacco. Traditionally a horse breeding area, Shingō is also known for its cattle ranches.

== Transportation ==
=== Railway ===
- The village has no passenger railway service. The nearest train station is JR East Hachinohe Station, served by the Tohoku Shinkansen and Hachinohe Lines, and the Aoimori Railway Aoimori Railway Line.

=== Highway ===
- National Route 454

== Local attractions ==
=== "Tomb of Jesus" ===
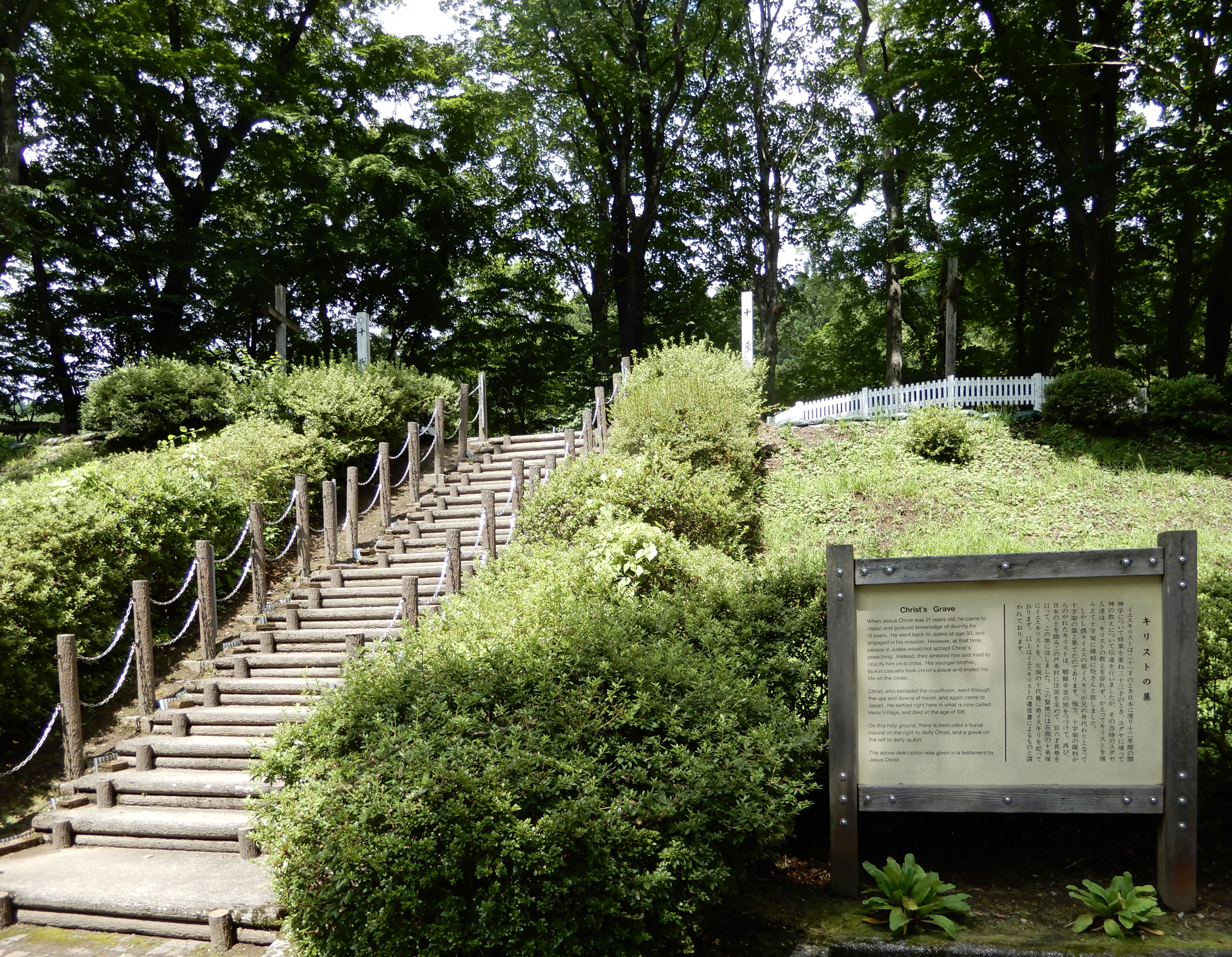
Alleged tomb of Jesus in Shingō village

Shingō is the location of what is purported to be the resting place of Jesus, the "Tomb of Christ" (Kirisuto no haka), and the residence of Jesus' descendants, the Sawaguchi family. According to these claims, Jesus Christ did not die on the cross at Golgotha. Instead, a man alleged to be his brother, Isukiri (literally "Jesus Chri"), took his place on the cross, while Jesus escaped across Siberia to Mutsu Province, in northern Japan.
