= Japan National Route 102 =

National highway in Japan

National Route 102
- 国道102号
- National Route 102 highlighted in red

Route information
- Length: 102.5 km (63.7 mi)
- Existed: 18 May 1953–present

Major junctions
- West end: National Route 7 in Hirosaki
- Tōhoku Expressway; National Route 394; National Route 454; National Route 103
- East end: National Route 4 / National Route 45 in Towada

Location
- Country: Japan

Highway system
- National highways of Japan; Expressways of Japan
← National Route 101	→ National Route 103

National Route 102 (国道102号, Kokudō Hyaku nigō) is a national highway in the Japanese prefecture of Aomori. Route 102 stretches 102.8 kilometers (63.9 mi) from National Route 7 in Hirosaki east to National Routes 4 and 45 in Towada.

== Route description ==
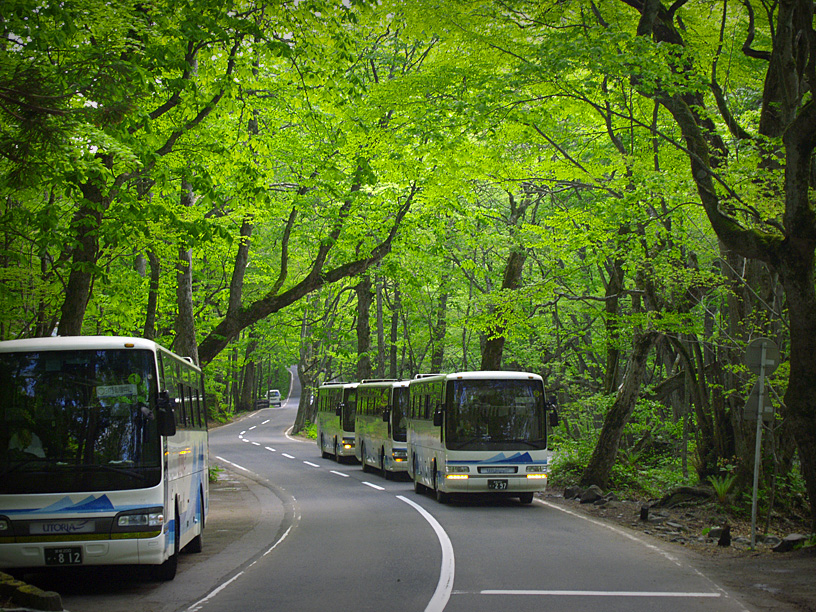
Buses on National Route 102 near the Oirase River

The highway crosses the central part Aomori Prefecture, linking Towada in the east to Hirosaki in the west. From Towada, the highway parallels the Oirase River to Lake Towada where it runs along the northern shore of the caldera crater lake. On the shore of the lake, it comes close to crossing into Akita Prefecture, but remains in Aomori. It then heads northwest passing through Hirakawa and Kuroishi. In Kuroishi, the road has a junction with the Tōhoku Expressway. West of this junction to the route's western terminus in Hirosaki, National Route 102 is designated as a Regional High-Standard Highway. The highway ends at a junction with National Route 7 near the center of Hirosaki.

== History ==
National Route 102 was originally designated on 18 May 1953 as route connecting Hirosaki to Hachinohe. On 1 April 1963, the route was shortened to Towada and the section between Towada and Hachinohe was incorporated into National Route 45.

== Major junctions ==
The route lies entirely within Aomori Prefecture.

Location	km	mi	Destinations	Notes
Hirosaki	0.0	0.0	National Route 7	Interchange; western end of unsigned Route 394 concurrency; western terminus
Kuroishi	9.3	5.8	Tōhoku Expressway – Morioka, Aomori	Interchange; Tōhoku Expressway exit 52 (Kuroishi Interchange)
Kuroishi	15.6	9.7	National Route 394 north	Eastern end of unsigned Route 394 concurrency
Hirakawa	24.0	14.9	National Route 454 west	Western end of Route 454 concurrency
Hirakawa	40.5	25.2	National Route 454 west	Eastern end of Route 454 concurrency
Towada	53.4	33.2	National Route 102 north (Oirase Bypass) – Aomori, Towada	
Towada	59.8	37.2	National Route 103 south – Ōdate	Western end of Route 103 concurrency
Towada	69.7	43.3	National Route 102 south (Oirase Bypass) – Kuroishi, Hirosaki	
Towada	73.5	45.7	National Route 103 north – Aomori	Eastern end of Route 103 concurrency
Towada	85.5	53.1	Aomori Prefecture Route 118 – Shichinohe	
Towada	85.5	53.1	Aomori Prefecture Route 40 – Aomori	
Towada	94.0	58.4	Aomori Prefecture Route 45 north	Western end of Prefecture Route 45 concurrency
Towada	95.0	59.0	Aomori Prefecture Routes 45/145 south	Eastern end of Prefecture Route 45 concurrency
Towada	101.8	63.3	National Route 4 / National Route 45	Eastern terminus
1.000 mi = 1.609 km; 1.000 km = 0.621 mi: Concurrency terminus
