= Takko =

Takko 田子町
- Town
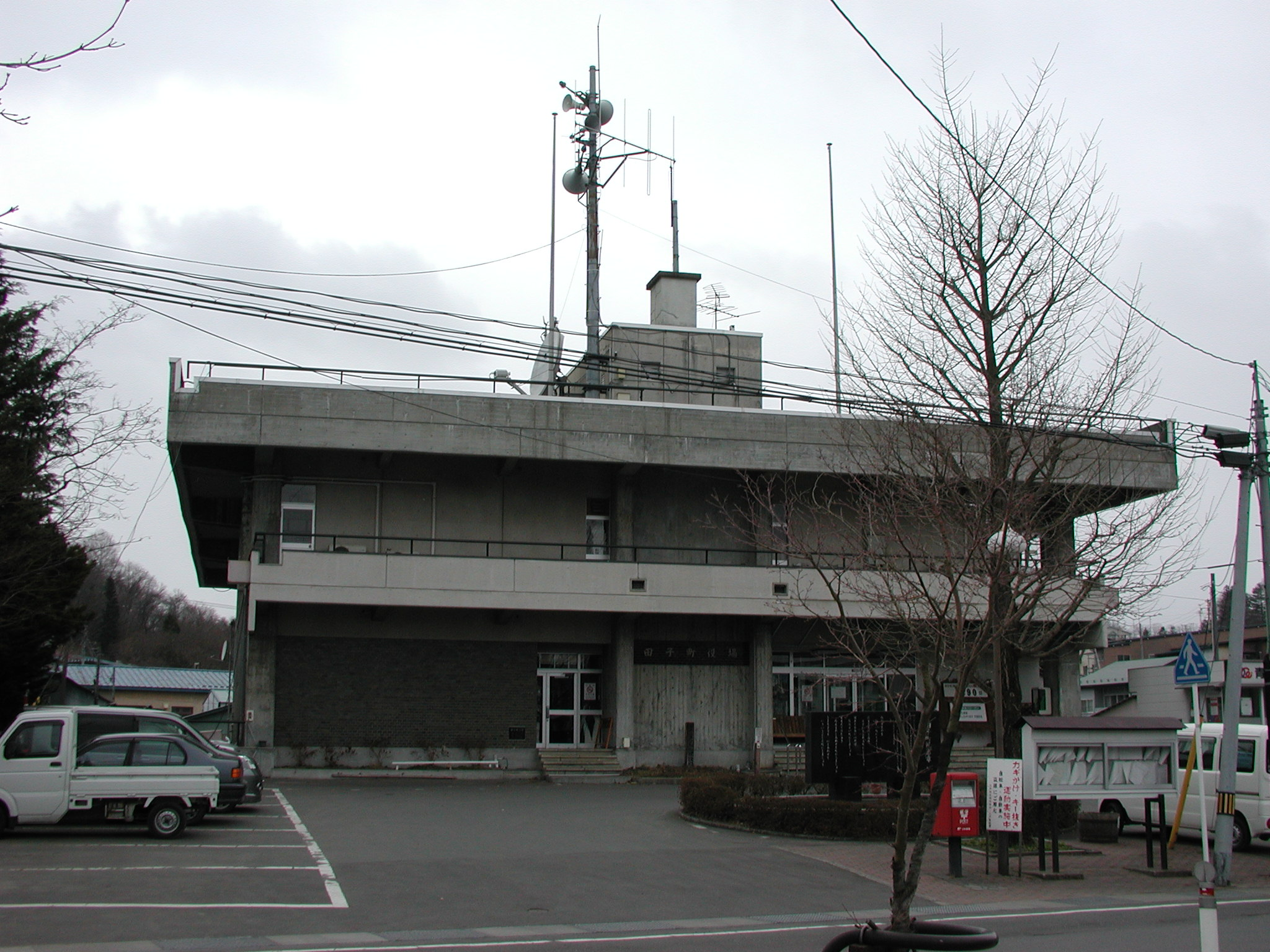
- Takko Town Hall

- Flag Seal
- Location of Takko in Aomori Prefecture

- Location within Japan
- Coordinates: 40°20′24″N 141°09′07″E
- Country: Japan
- Region: Tōhoku
- Prefecture: Aomori
- District: Sannohe

Government
  - Type: 'Mayor-council government'
  - Mayor: Harumi Yamamoto

Area
  - Total: 241.98 km^{2} (93.43 sq mi)

Population (December 31, 2025)
  - Total: 4,592
  - Density: 18.98/km^{2} (49.15/sq mi)
- Time zone: UTC+9 (Japan Standard Time)
- Phone number: 0179-32-3111
- Address: 81 Tenjindōtai Tako-machi, Sannohe-gun, Aomori-ken 039-0201
- Website: www.town.takko.lg.jp
- Symbols
- Bird: Wagtail
- Flower: Azalea
- Tree: Japanese rowan

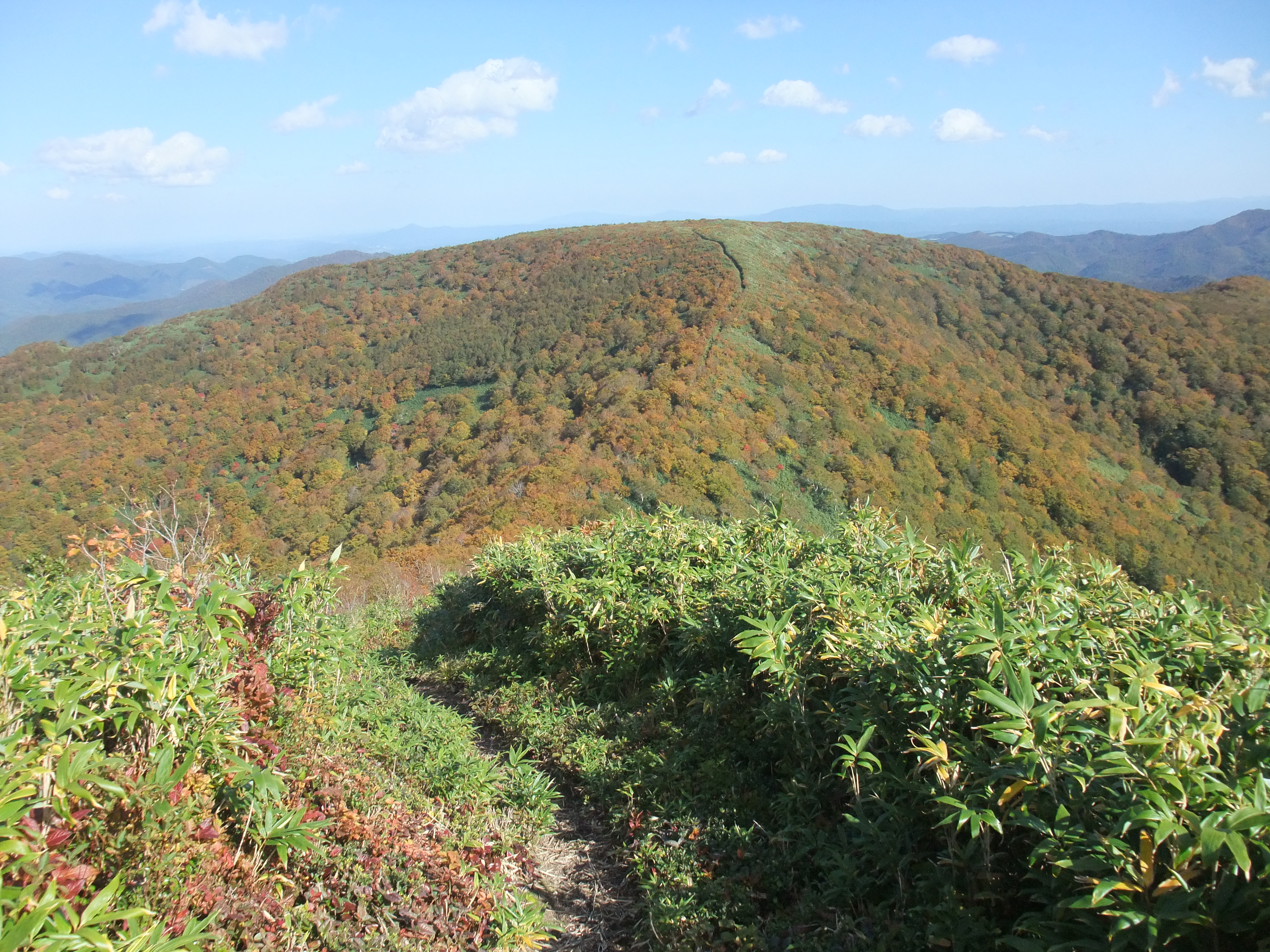
Shikakudake on the border of Takko with Iwate Prefecture and Akita Prefecture

Takko (田子町, Takko-machi) is a town located in Aomori Prefecture, Japan. As of 31 December 2025, the town had an estimated population of 4,592 in 20507 households and a population density of 19 persons per km^{2} The total area of the town is 241.98 square kilometres (93.43 sq mi).

== Geography ==
Takko occupies the far southeast corner of Aomori Prefecture, south of the Hakkōda Mountains. Much of the town is mountainous with peaks ranging from 700 to 1000 meters. The mountainous area is home to many indigenous plant and animal species. Wildlife includes Japanese macaque monkeys, kamoshika, tanuki, and Asian black bears. The residential area is mainly along the river basins such as the Kumabara River, the Ayome River, and the Okawa River, which flow from east to west through the town.

=== Neighbouring municipalities ===
Aomori Prefecture

- Sannohe District
  - Sannohe

Akita Prefecture

- Kazuno

Iwate Prefecture

- Hachimantai
- Ninohe

=== Climate ===
The town has a cold Humid continental climate characterized by cool, short summers and long, cold winters with extremely heavy snowfall (Köppen climate classification Dfa). The average annual temperature in Takko is 8.8 °C. The average annual rainfall is 1375 mm with September as the wettest month. The temperatures are highest on average in August, at around 22.4 °C, and lowest in January, at around -3.8 °C.

== Demographics ==
Per Japanese census data, the population of Takko peaked at around the year 1960 and has declined steadily over the past 60 years. It is now less than it was a century ago.

Historical population
| Year | Pop. | ±% |
|---|---|---|
| 1920 | 7,896 | — |
| 1930 | 8,579 | +8.6% |
| 1940 | 8,832 | +2.9% |
| 1950 | 10,834 | +22.7% |
| 1960 | 11,097 | +2.4% |
| 1970 | 9,427 | −15.0% |
| 1980 | 8,878 | −5.8% |
| 1990 | 8,106 | −8.7% |
| 2000 | 7,288 | −10.1% |
| 2010 | 6,176 | −15.3% |
| 2020 | 4,968 | −19.6% |

== History ==
The area around Takko has been inhabited since prehistoric times, and numerous Jōmon period remains have been discovered. The town name is derived from an Ainu word "tapkop", meaning "small hill". During the Edo period, the area was controlled by the Nambu clan of Morioka Domain and later by Hachinohe Domain. During the post-Meiji restoration establishment of the modern municipalities system on 1 April 1889, Takko Village was created as a separate village from former Kamigō Village. It was elevated to town status on November 10, 1928. On March 1, 1955, Kamigō Village merged back with Takko Town.

== Government ==
Takko has a mayor-council form of government with a directly elected mayor and a unicameral town council of ten members. Takko is part of Sannohe District which contributes three members to the Aomori Prefectural Assembly. In terms of national politics, the town is part of Aomori 2nd district of the lower house of the Diet of Japan.

== Economy ==
The economy of Takko is heavily dependent on agriculture and forestry. The main crop is garlic, of which Takko is Japan's largest producer.

== Education ==
Takko has one public elementary school and one public middle school operated by the town government. The town's only high school closed in 2022.

== Transportation ==
=== Railway ===
- The town has no passenger railway service. The nearest train station is Sannohe Station on the Aoimori Railway Aoimori Railway Line.

=== Highway ===
- National Route 104

== International relations ==
- – Gilroy, California, United States, sister city since April 18, 1988
- – Monticelli d'Ongina, Emilia-Romagna, Italy – sister city since September 11, 1992
- - Seosan, South Chungcheong Province, South Korea, friendship city since June 22, 2012
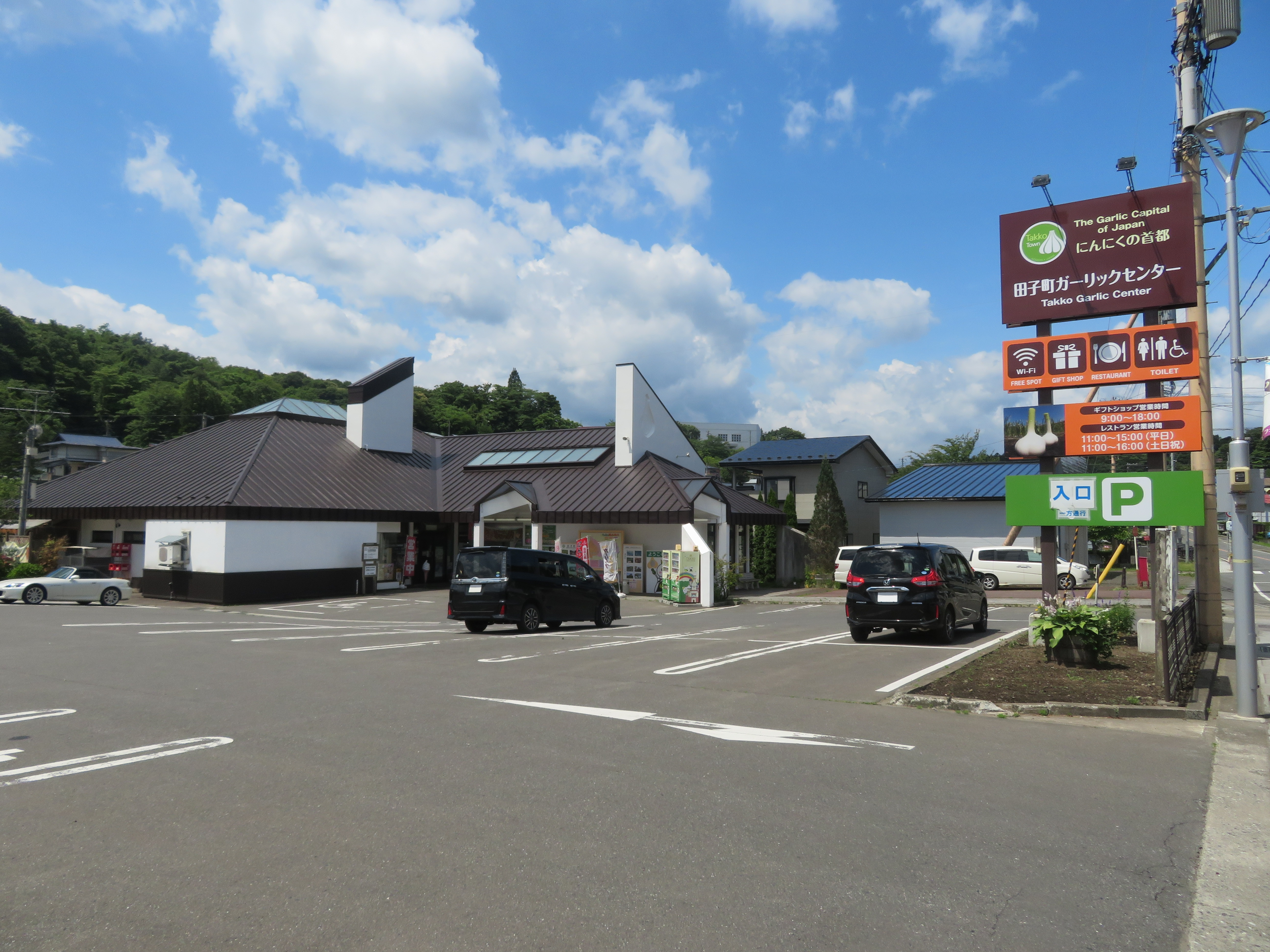
Takko Garlic Center

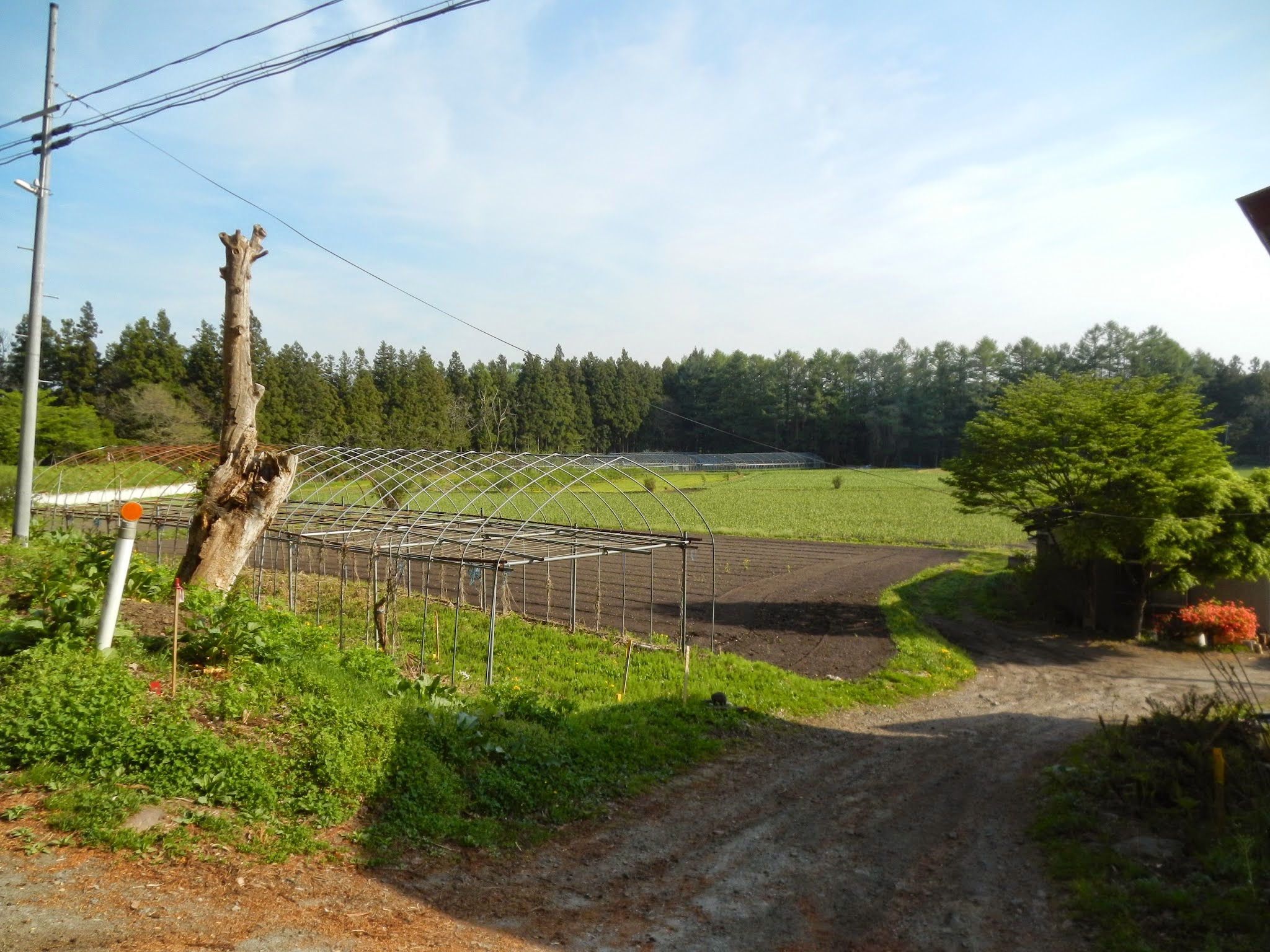
Panorama of Takko

== Noted people from Takko ==
- Sampachi Kawa – manga artist
