= Nangō, Aomori =

Nangō 南郷村
- Former municipality
- Flag Seal

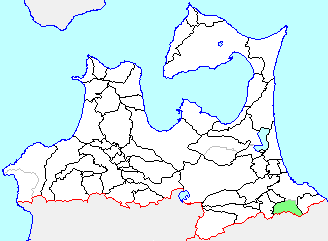
- Location of Nangō in Aomori Prefecture

- Location in Japan
- Coordinates: 40°24′13.40″N 141°26′14.5″E
- Country: Japan
- Region: Tōhoku
- Prefecture: Aomori Prefecture
- District: Sannohe
- Merged: March 31, 2005 (now part of Hachinohe)

Area
  - Total: 91.13 km^{2} (35.19 sq mi)

Population (February 1, 2006)
  - Total: 6,440
  - Density: 70.67/km^{2} (183.0/sq mi)
- Time zone: UTC+09:00 (JST)
- Symbols
- Bird: Green pheasant
- Flower: Far East Amur adonis
- Tree: Japanese red pine

Nangō (南郷村, Nangō-mura) was a village located in Sannohe District in central Aomori Prefecture, Japan.

Nangō Village was founded on April 1, 1889. On March 31, 1957 it merged with the neighboring villages of Shimamori and Nakazawa.

On March 31, 2005, Nangō was merged into the expanded city of Hachinohe, and thus it no longer exists as an independent municipality.

An inland village, Nangō had an agriculture-based economy. At the time of its merger, Nangō had an estimated population of 6,440 and a population density of 70.67 persons per km^{2}. The total area was 91.13 km^{2}.
