= Ōyu Stone Circles =

Archaeological site in Kazuno, Akita, Japan

- 大湯環状列石 (Japanese)
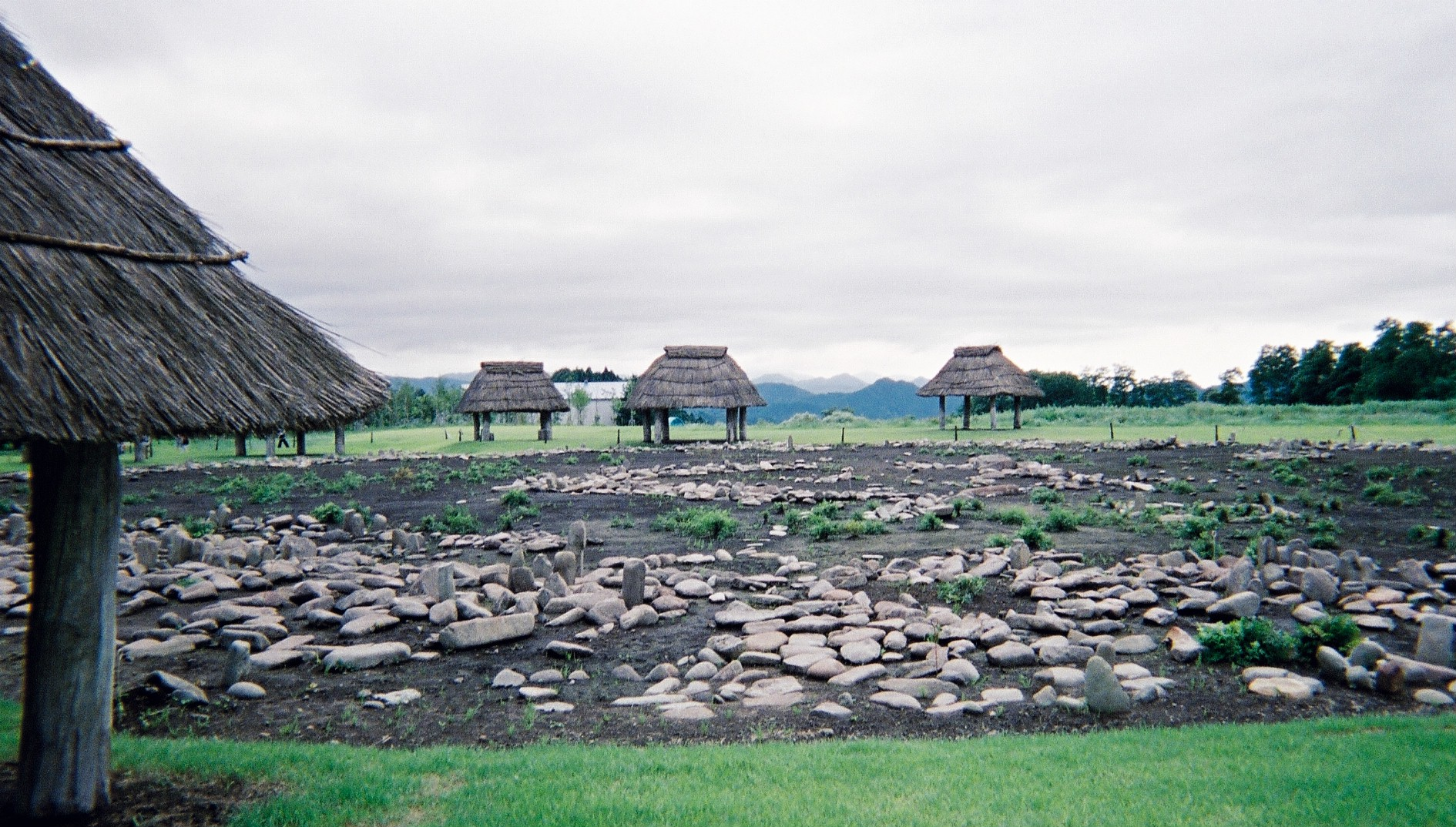
- Ōyu Stone Circles

- Ōyu Stone Circles Ōyu Stone Circles (Japan)
- 40°16′18″N 140°48′14″E
- Type: stone circle
- Periods: Jōmon period
- Location: Kazuno, Akita, Japan
- Region: Tōhoku region

History
- Built: 2000 BCE

Site notes
- Public access: Yes

The Ōyu Stone Circles (大湯環状列石, Ōyu Kanjyō Resseki) is a late Jōmon period (approx. 2,000 – 1,500 BC) archaeological site in the city of Kazuno, Akita Prefecture, in the Tōhoku region of northern Japan. The remains were designated a Special National Historic Site of Japan in 1956 by the Japanese government. The site is located approximately ten minutes by car from Towada-Minami on the JR East Hanawa Line of the Towada Interchange on the Tohoku Expressway.

== Description ==
The site consists of two large stone circles built on an artificially flattened plateau on the left bank of the Ōyu River, a tributary of the Yoneshiro River in northeastern Akita Prefecture. The site was discovered in 1931, with detailed archaeological excavations taking place in 1946 and in 1951-1952.

The larger circle, named the Manza (万座) circle, has a diameter of 46 metres and is the largest stone circle found in Japan. Several reconstructions of Jomon period dwellings have been built around the site. The slightly smaller circle, named the Nonakadō (野中堂) circle, is 42 metres in diameter and is around 90 metres away, separated from the Manza circle by Akita Prefectural Route 66. Each circle is made from rounded river stones brought from another river approximately 7 kilometres away. Each circle consists of two concentric rings separated by an open strip approximately 8 metres wide. Each circle contains smaller clusters of stone, including standing stones surrounded by elongated stones in a radiating orientation, forming a sundial pointing toward the sunset on the summer solstice, and allows for calculation of the winter solstice, the vernal equinox and the sun's movements.

Each circle is surrounded by the remains of buildings, storage pits and midden, and clay figurines, clayware and stoneware (including everyday pottery), stone swords and objects have been discovered. Although the form of the stone circles may have been based on the shape of circular settlements, there is no indication of permanent settlement on the site.

== UNESCO listing ==
The site is on the UNESCO World Heritage List as one of the Jōmon Archaeological Sites in Hokkaidō, Northern Tōhoku, and other regions.

== See also ==
- List of Historic Sites of Japan (Akita)
- Matagi
