= Gonohe =

Town in Aomori Japan

Gonohe 五戸町
- Town
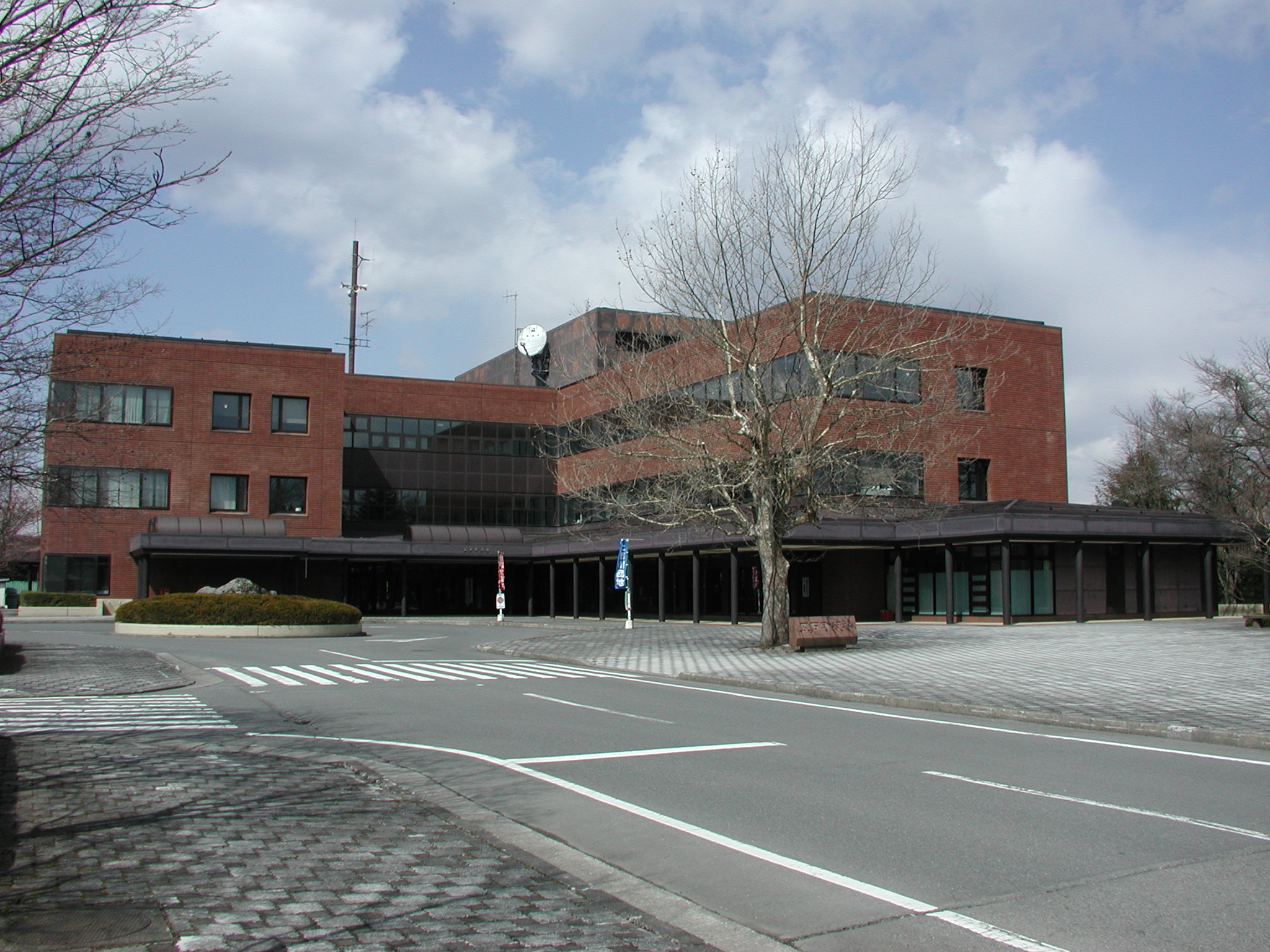
- Gonohe Town Hall

- Flag Seal

- Interactive map of Gonohe
- Coordinates: 40°31′52″N 141°18′29″E
- Country: Japan
- Region: Tōhoku
- Prefecture: Aomori
- District: Sannohe

Area
  - Total: 177.67 km^{2} (68.60 sq mi)

Population (January 1, 2026)
  - Total: 14,977
  - Density: 84.297/km^{2} (218.33/sq mi)
- Time zone: UTC+9 (Japan Standard Time)
- Phone number: 0178-62-2111
- Address: 21-1 Fukutachi, Gonohe-machi, Sannohe-gun, Aomori-ken 039-1513
- Website: Official website
- Symbols
- Flower: Chrysanthemum
- Tree: Japanese yew

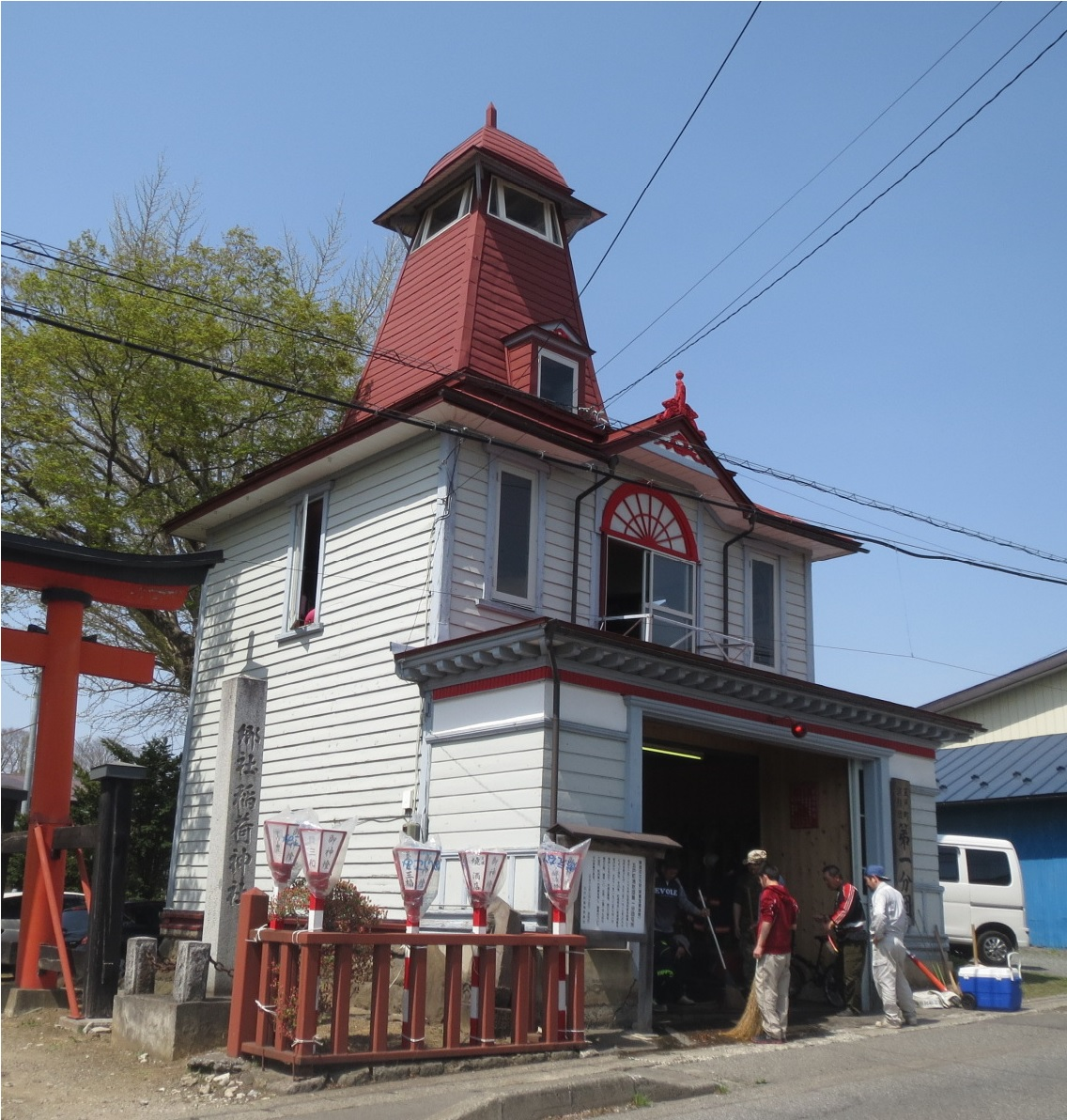
Gonohe Fire Station

Gonohe (五戸町, Gonohe-machi) is a town located in Aomori Prefecture, Japan. As of 1 January 2026, the town had an estimated population of 14,977 in 6,948 households, and a population density of 84 persons per km^{2}. The total area of the town is 177.67 square kilometres (68.60 sq mi).

== Geography ==
Gonohe is located in the north-eastern part of Sannohe District, approximately 16 kilometres west of Hachinohe City and 10 kilometres southeast of Towada City. The town is adjacent to Hachinohe City to the east, Shingō Village to the west, Nanbu Town to the south, and Towada City, Oirase Town and Rokunohe Town to the north. The land extends 16.8 kilometres east-to-west and 18.55 kilometres north-to-south.

The Gonohegawa River, which flows from Mt. Heraidake into the Pacific Ocean, and the Asamizugawa River, which originates from a hot spring swamp to join the Mabechi River, run parallel to each other through the town. While embracing these two rivers, residential areas have formed, and rice fields can be found in the flat areas that benefit from the favourable flows of water. The slightly sloped hillside areas spread to the east of the Ōu Mountains and are utilized as crop fields and apple orchards. Forests occupy more than half of the town's total area.

=== Neighbouring municipalities ===
Aomori Prefecture

- Hachinohe
- Nanbu
- Oirase
- Rokunohe
- Shingō
- Towada

=== Climate ===
The type of weather most characteristic of the region is the yamase, the easterly winds which bring cold air in summer. In Gonohe, the yamase brings rain and, when such conditions last for a long time, harvests are significantly affected because of the low temperatures and lack of sunshine. However, the town receives relatively less snow than its location in northern Tōhoku would otherwise suggest. The town falls within the Köppen climate classification Cfa. The average annual temperature in Gonohe is 9.9 °C. The average annual rainfall is 1205 mm with September as the wettest month. The temperatures are highest on average in August, at around 22.8 °C, and lowest in January, at around -2.1 °C.

== Demographics ==
Per Japanese census data, the population of Gonohe has steadily declined over the past 70 years.

Historical population
Year	Pop.	±% p.a.
1950	27,218	—
1960	25,610	−0.61%
1970	24,061	−0.62%
1980	23,720	−0.14%
1990	22,525	−0.52%
2000	21,318	−0.55%
2010	18,718	−1.29%
2020	16,042	−1.53%

== History ==
The most common meanings of the kanji used in the town's name (五戸) are "five" and "door/gate," respectively. However, in the case of Gonohe (and other similar place names in the region), it is believed that the second character in the name carries the meaning of 'ranch,' with the town name being derived from a numbered fortified stockade system developed by the Nanbu clan who once ruled in the region. In 1189, during the Kamakura period, Nanbu Mitsuyuki, a retainer of Minamoto no Yoritomo from Kai Province was awarded the Nukanobu (糠部) district of far northern Mutsu Province after the defeat of the Northern Fujiwara clan. The land was found to be suitable for raising warhorses, for which the region became famous. The area was part of Hachinohe Domain under the Edo period Tokugawa shogunate.

In April 1889, with the introduction of the modern municipalities system, the area became Gonohe Village. In November 1915, the village was elevated to town status. In July 1955, Gonohe Town was combined with neighboring Kawauchi and Asada villages; this also included incorporating part of the Tekurabashi area of Nozawa Village and the Toyomauchi area of Toyosaki Village. The town merged with the neighbouring village of Kuraishi on April 1, 2012. In recent years there has been a small community of repatriated Manchukuoan Japanese living in Kuraishi.

== Government ==
Gonohe has a mayor-council form of government with a directly elected mayor and a unicameral town council of 16 members. Gonohe is part of Sannohe District which contributes three members to the Aomori Prefectural Assembly. In terms of national politics, the town is part of Aomori 2nd district of the lower house of the Diet of Japan.

== Economy ==
The key industry of the town is agriculture, with a focus mainly on producing vegetables, rice and livestock. Since the town was designated a new industrial city of the Hachinohe region, inland industries have developed in the Jizodaira Industrial Estate, where 20 companies are now in operation.

== Education ==
Gonohe has four public elementary schools and three public middle schools operated by the town government, and one medical vocational training school The town had one public high school operated by the Aomori Prefectural Board of Education, but it closed in 2022.

== International relations ==
- Bayombong, Nueva Vizcaya, Philippines since 1983
- Okcheon, Chungcheongbuk-do, South Korea since 1997

=== Recent controversy ===
On 28 June 2001, the town's Korean "sister city" Okcheon cancelled a planned trip to send students, on an exchange visit to Gonohe in reaction to approvals by the Japanese government of a series of middle school history textbooks that were regarded by Korea as distorting historical facts. The event was preceded by a related incident in April of that year, when a group of Gonohe assemblymen cancelled a planned visit to Korea that May, citing financial difficulties.

== Transportation ==
=== Railway ===
The Tōhoku Shinkansen passes through Gonohe, but the town has had no passenger railway services after the discontinuation of the Nambu Junkan Railway in 1968, which previously connected it to Hachinohe.

=== Highway ===
- National Route 4
- National Route 454

== Local attractions ==
- Rekishi-Mirai Park
- Gonohe former fire station
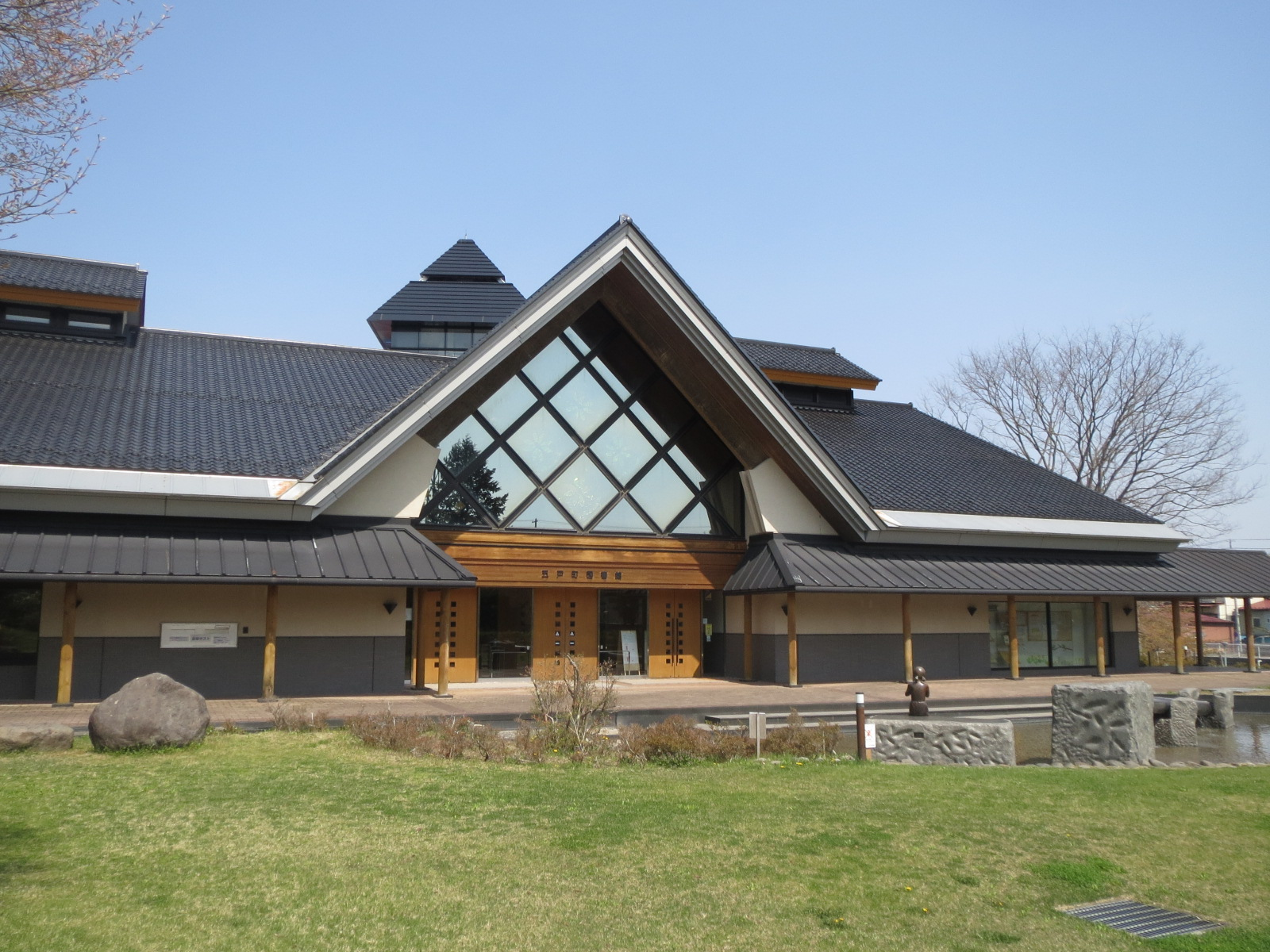
Gonohe Town Library in the Rekishi-Mirai Park

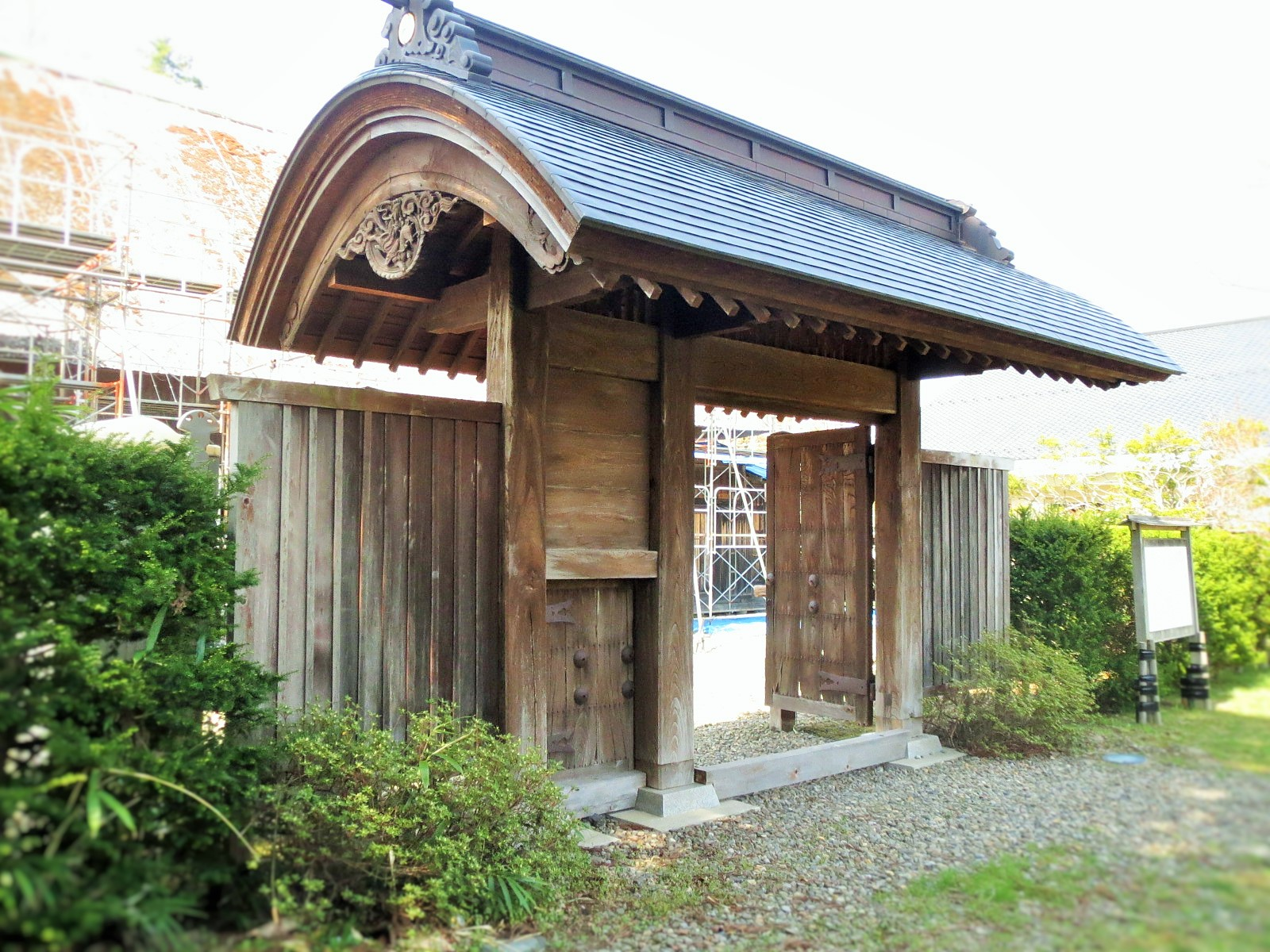
Gonohe Daikansho Gate, in the Rekishi-Mirai Park

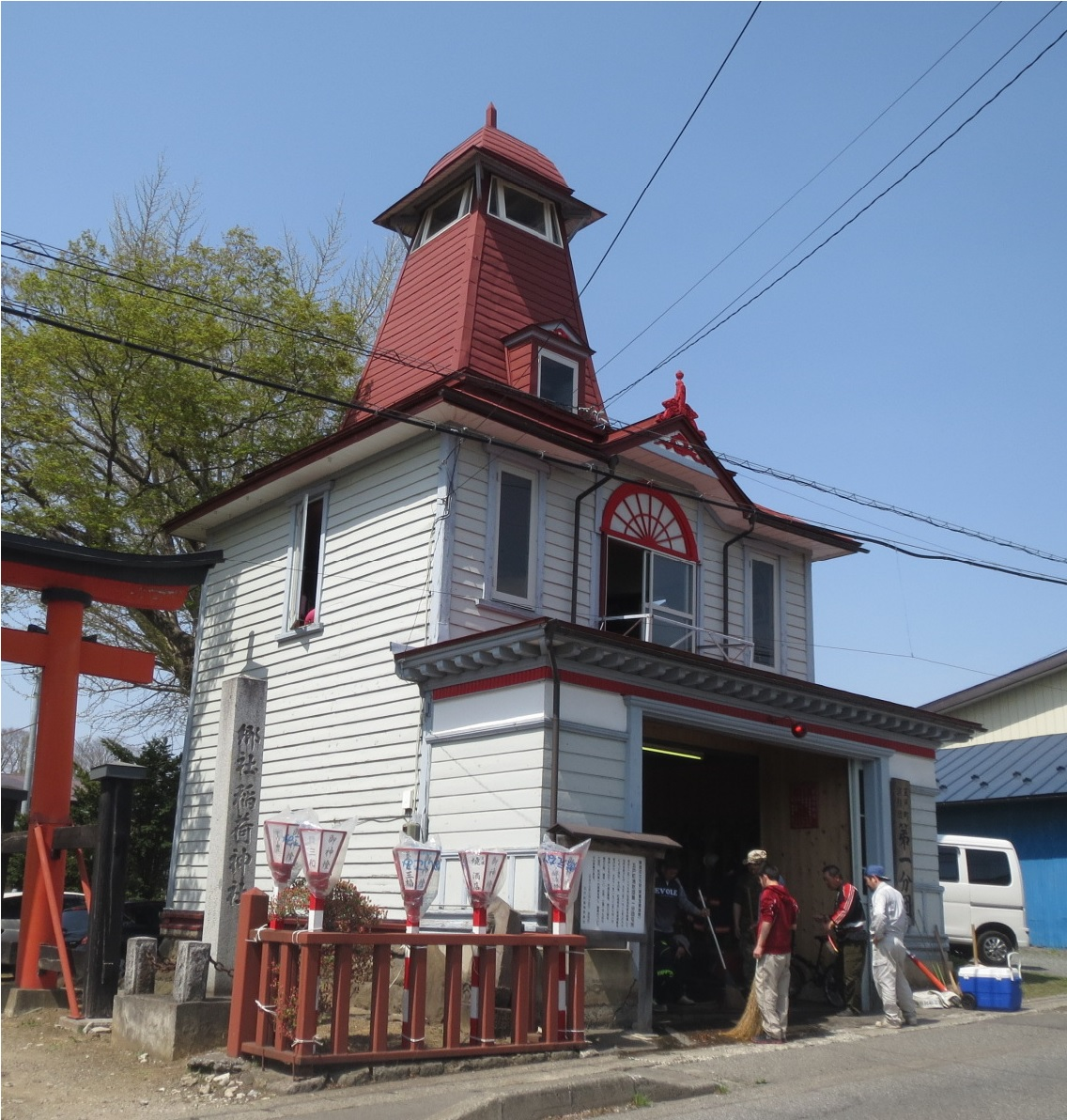
Gonohe former fire station

== Local culture ==
In its earlier history Gonohe enjoyed a reputation as a breeding centre for horses of exceptional quality, popular amongst the samurai. With the decline of the samurai, Gonohe's horses continued to be bred for their meat. The lean horse meat is coveted as a delicacy, especially when served in its raw form, known as Basashi (馬刺し). This dish is a specialty of both Gonohe and Kumamoto in southern Kyūshū. After horses, Gonohe is best known for the local popularity of soccer.

== Noted residents of Gonohe ==
- Kyōsuke Eto, local war hero
- Tsuyoshi Furukawa, professional soccer player
- Masayoshi Miura, professional baseball player
- Takahiro Shimotaira, professional soccer player
- Hiroshi Teguramori, professional soccer player
- Makoto Teguramori, professional soccer player
