= Japan National Route 285 =

National highway in Japan

National Route 285
- 国道285号
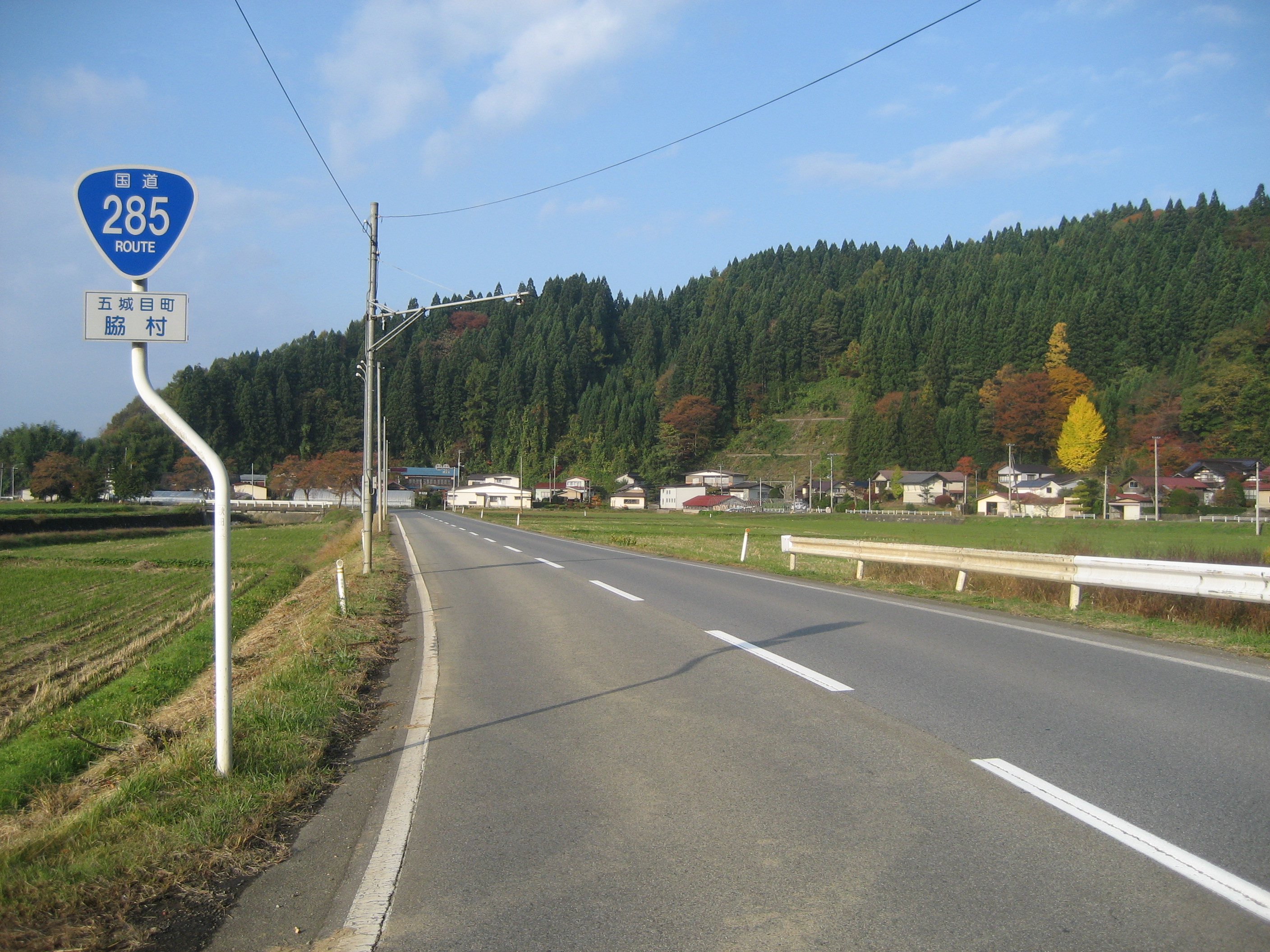

Route information
- Length: 116.0 km (72.1 mi)

Location
- Country: Japan

Highway system
- National highways of Japan; Expressways of Japan
← National Route 284	→ National Route 286

National Route 285 is a national highway of Japan connecting Akita, Akita and Kazuno, Akita in Japan, with a total length of 116 km (72.08 mi).
