= Kitatakaiwa Station =

Railway station in Hachinohe, Aomori Prefecture, Japan

Kitatakaiwa Station 北高岩駅
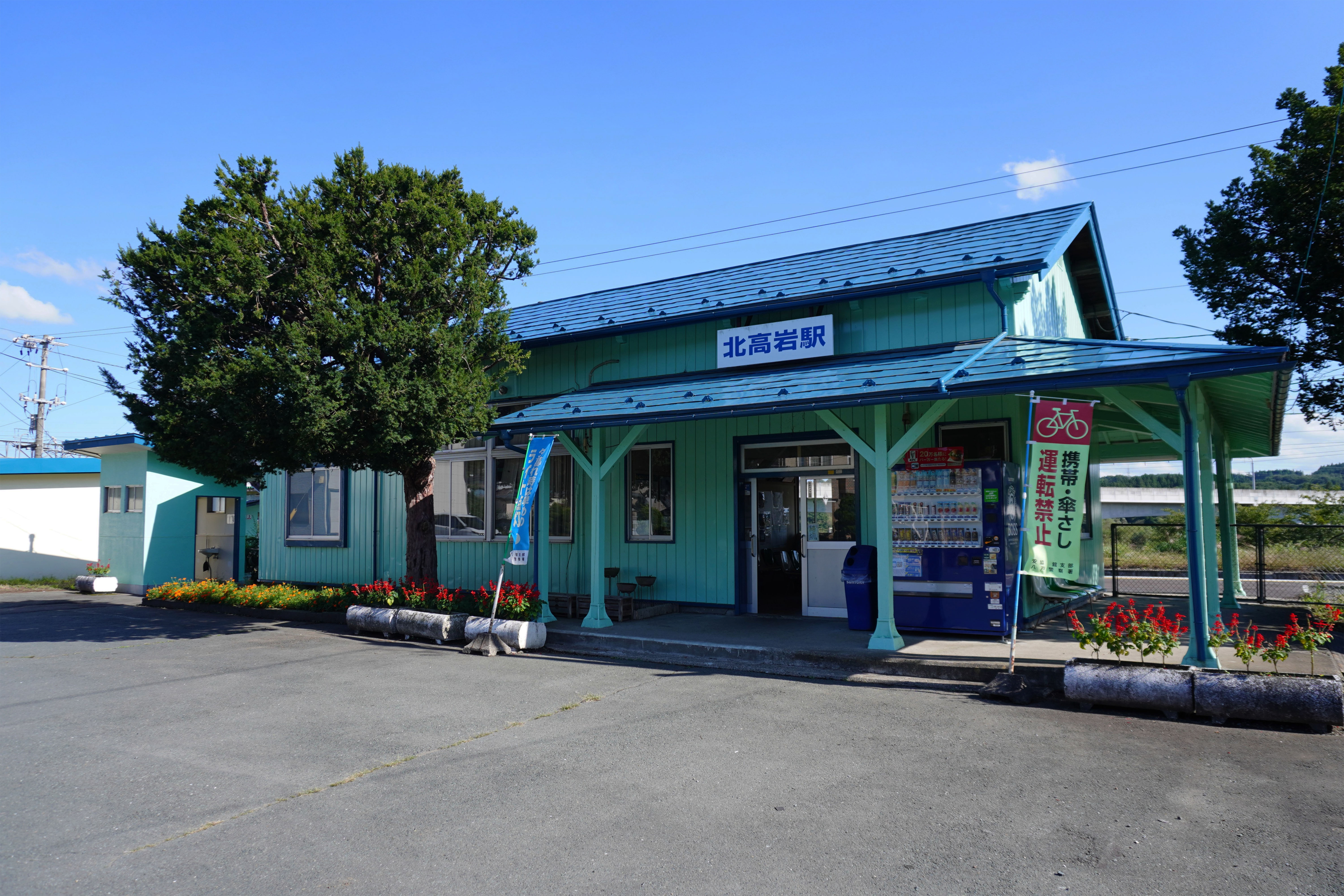
- Kitatakaiwa Station in September 2023

General information
- Location: Ueno-Takaiwa, Hachinohe, Aomori Prefecture 039-1108; Japan
- Coordinates: 40°28′31″N 141°24′21″E
- System: Regional rail station
- Operator: Aoimori Railway
- Line: ■ Aoimori Railway Line
- Distance: 21.0 km from Metoki
- Platforms: 1 island + 1 side platform
- Tracks: 3

Construction
- Structure type: At grade

Other information
- Status: Unstaffed
- Website: Official website

History
- Opened: 10 August 1923

Services
Preceding station	Aoimori Railway	Following station
Tomabechi towards Metoki	Aoimori Railway Line	Hachinohe towards Aomori
Location
- Location within Aomori Prefecture Location within Japan

Kitatakaiwa Station (北高岩駅, Kitatakaiwa-eki) is a railway station on the Aoimori Railway Line in the city of Hachinohe in Aomori Prefecture, Japan, operated by the third sector railway operator Aoimori Railway Company.

== Location ==
Kitatakaiwa Station is served by the Aoimori Railway Line, and is 21.0 kilometers from the terminus of the line at Metoki Station. It is 638.3 kilometers from Tokyo Station.

=== Surrounding area ===
- National Route 104
- Mabechi River

== History ==
Kitatakaiwa Station was opened on 10 August 1923 as a station of the Tōhoku Main Line on the Japan National Railways (JNR). Freight operations were discontinued from April 1962. The station has been unattended since May 1980. With the privatization of the JNR on 1 April 1987, it came under the operational control of the East Japan Railway Company (JR East). It came under the control of the Aoimori Railway Company on 1 December 2002.

== Station layout ==
Kitatakaiwa Station has a one ground-level island platform and one ground-level side platform serving three tracks connected to the station building by a footbridge. However, only tracks 1 and 3 are in use, and track 2 is used as a siding. The station building is not staffed.

=== Platforms ===
1	■ Aoimori Railway Line	for Hachinohe and Aomori
2	■ Aoimori Railway Line	(siding)
3	■ Aoimori Railway Line	for Sannohe and Morioka

== See also ==
- List of railway stations in Japan
