= Kenyoshi Station =

Railway station in Nanbu, Aomori Prefecture, Japan

Kenyoshi Station 剣吉駅
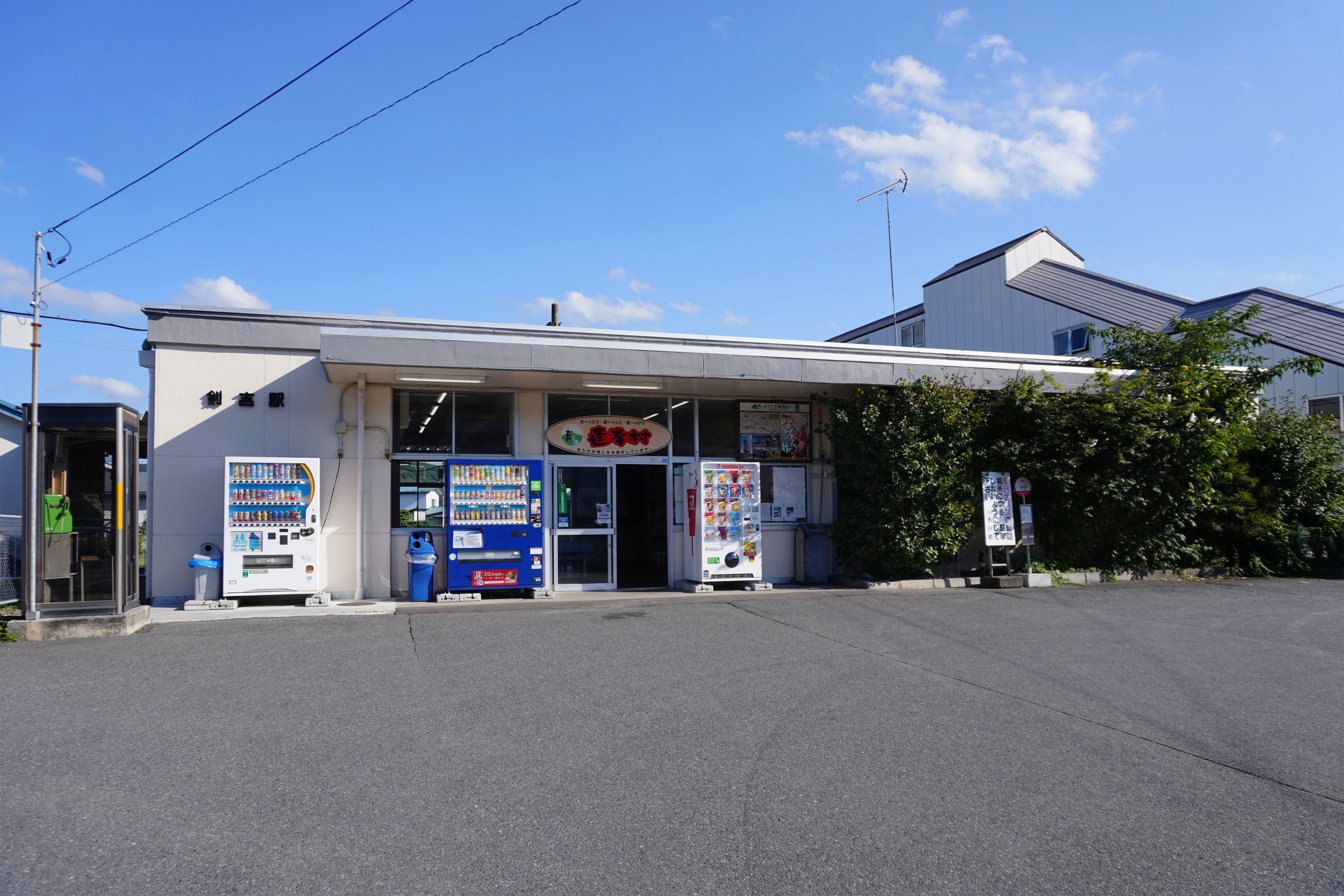
- Kenyoshi Station in September 2023

General information
- Location: Kenyoshi, Nanbu-machi, Sannohe-gun, Aomori-ken 039-0612; Japan
- Coordinates: 40°26′55″N 141°20′46″E
- System: Regional rail station
- Operator: Aoimori Railway
- Line: ■ Aoimori Railway Line
- Distance: 14.8 km from Metoki
- Platforms: 2 side platforms
- Tracks: 2

Construction
- Structure type: At grade

Other information
- Status: Staffed
- Website: Official website

History
- Opened: July 1, 1897

Services
Preceding station	Aoimori Railway	Following station
Suwanotaira towards Metoki	Aoimori Railway Line	Tomabechi towards Aomori
Location
- Location within Aomori Prefecture Location within Japan

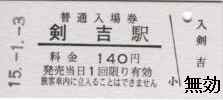
Platform ticket for Kenyoshi Station

Kenyoshi Station (剣吉駅, Ken'yoshi-eki) is a railway station on the Aoimori Railway Line in the town of Nanbu in Aomori Prefecture, Japan, operated by the third sector railway operator Aoimori Railway Company.

== Lines ==
Kenyoshi Station is served by the Aoimori Railway Line, and is 14.8 kilometers from the terminus of the line at Metoki Station. It is 632.1 kilometers from Tokyo Station.

== Station layout ==
Kenyoshi Station has two ground-level opposed side platforms serving two tracks connected to the station building by a footbridge. The station is staffed.

=== Platforms ===
1	■ Aoimori Railway Line	for Hachinohe and Aomori
2	■ Aoimori Railway Line	for Sannohe and Morioka

== History ==
Kenyoshi Station was opened on July 1, 1897, as a station of the Nippon Railway. When the Nippon Railway was nationalized on November 1, 1906, it became a station on the Tōhoku Main Line of the Japanese Government Railways (JGR) and later the Japanese National Railways (JNR). Freight operations were discontinued from November 1982. The station has been managed from Hachinohe Station since February 1983. With the privatization of the JNR on April 1, 1987, it came under the operational control of JR East. The station came under the control of the Aoimori Railway Line on December 1, 2002.

== Surrounding area ==
- National Route 104
- Mabechi River
- Aomori Bank Kenyoshi branch
- Nagawa Post office
- Nanbu town office Kenyoshi branch

== See also ==
- List of railway stations in Japan
