= Results of the 2007 Japanese House of Councillors election =

This article presents detail of the results in the 2007 Japanese House of Councillors election, breaking down results by prefectures of Japan.

== Hokkaidō ==
The prefecture of Hokkaidō have two councillors in the Upper House. Democratic Party of Japan and the Liberal Democratic Party each won one seat.

Candidate	Party	Votes	%
Katsuya Ogawa	Democratic Party of Japan	1,018,597	36.03
Chuichi Date	Liberal Democratic Party–Komeito	757,463	26.79
Kaori Tahara	Independent (DPJ–PNP–NPN)	621,497	21.98
Kazuya Hatayama	Japanese Communist Party	206,463	7.30
Hideyoshi Hashiba	Independent	103,282	3.65
Takao Asano	Social Democratic Party	79,474	2.81
Masayuki Arakawa	Independent	22,154	0.78
Nobuhito Sendai	Ishin Seito Shimpu	18,234	0.64
Total		2,827,164	100.00
Valid votes		2,827,164	97.25
Invalid/blank votes		79,837	2.75
Total votes		2,907,001	100.00
Registered voters/turnout		4,658,649	62.40
Source: Ministry of Internal Affairs and Communications

== Aomori ==
The prefecture of Aomori have one councillor in the Upper House. Democratic Party of Japan won the seat.

Candidate	Party	Votes	%
Kōji Hirayama	Democratic Party of Japan–People's New Party	305,642	49.00
Tsutomu Yamazaki	Liberal Democratic Party–Komeito	248,782	39.88
Hidehiko Watanabe	Social Democratic Party	37,370	5.99
Hiroaki Takayagi	Japanese Communist Party	32,014	5.13
Total		623,808	100.00
Valid votes		623,808	98.07
Invalid/blank votes		12,248	1.93
Total votes		636,056	100.00
Registered voters/turnout		1,180,500	53.88
Source: Ministry of Internal Affairs and Communications

== Akita ==
The prefecture of Akita has one councillor in the Upper House. An independent supported by the Democratic Party of Japan and Social Democratic Party won the seat.

Candidate	Party	Votes	%
Daigo Matsuura	Independent (DPJ–SDP)	319,631	50.36
Katsutoshi Kaneda	Liberal Democratic Party	276,694	43.59
Satoshi Suzuki	Japanese Communist Party	38,394	6.05
Total		634,719	100.00
Valid votes		634,719	98.73
Invalid/blank votes		8,142	1.27
Total votes		642,861	100.00
Registered voters/turnout		949,602	67.70
Source: Ministry of Internal Affairs and Communications

== Iwate ==
The prefecture of Iwate has one councillor in the Upper House. The Democratic Party of Japan scored a major victory.

Candidate	Party	Votes	%
Tatsuo Hirano	Democratic Party of Japan–People's New Party	437,814	62.60
Shōichirō Chida	Liberal Democratic Party–Komeito	176,096	25.18
Masahiro Isawa	Social Democratic Party	47,425	6.78
Akio Wakayama	Japanese Communist Party	38,089	5.45
Total		699,424	100.00
Valid votes		699,424	97.88
Invalid/blank votes		15,122	2.12
Total votes		714,546	100.00
Registered voters/turnout		1,127,120	63.40
Source: Ministry of Internal Affairs and Communications

== Miyagi ==
The prefecture of Miyagi have two councillors in the Upper House. The Democratic Party of Japan won the seat.

Candidate	Party	Votes	%
Tomiko Okazaki	Democratic Party of Japan	549,183	52.74
Jirō Aichi	Liberal Democratic Party–Komeito	359,099	34.48
Mikio Katō	Japanese Communist Party	71,689	6.88
Kiyomi Kishida	Social Democratic Party	61,349	5.89
Total		1,041,320	100.00
Valid votes		1,041,320	97.82
Invalid/blank votes		23,208	2.18
Total votes		1,064,528	100.00
Registered voters/turnout		1,908,286	55.78
Source: Ministry of Internal Affairs and Communications

== Yamagata ==
The prefecture of Yamagata has one councillor in the Upper House. The Democratic Party of Japan won the seat.

Candidate	Party	Votes	%
Yasue Funayama	Democratic Party of Japan–People's New Party	371,071	57.30
Mieko Shinohara	Liberal Democratic Party–Komeito	238,515	36.83
Masayuki Satō	Japanese Communist Party	38,008	5.87
Total		647,594	100.00
Valid votes		647,594	98.27
Invalid/blank votes		11,413	1.73
Total votes		659,007	100.00
Registered voters/turnout		979,389	67.29
Source: Ministry of Internal Affairs and Communications
