= Aomori at-large district =

Japan House of Councillors constituency

- 青森県選挙区
- Parliamentary constituency for the House of Councillors
- Prefecture: Aomori
- Electorate: 1,069,653 (as of September 2022)

Current constituency
- Created: 1947
- Seats: 2
- Councillors: Class of 2028: Masayo Tanabu (CDP); Class of 2031: Masumi Fukushi (CDP)

The Aomori at-large district (Japanese: 青森県選挙区, Hepburn: Aomori-ken Senkyoku) is a constituency that represents Aomori Prefecture in the House of Councillors in the Diet of Japan. Councillors are elected to the house by single non-transferable vote (SNTV) for six-year terms. Since the establishment of the current House of Councillors electoral system in 1947, the district has elected two Councillors, one each at elections held every three years. It has 1,122,948 registered voters as of September 2015.

== Elected Councillors ==
| Class of 1947 | Election year | Class of 1950 |
| (1947: 6-year term) | Election year | (1947: 3-year term) |
|---|---|---|
| Naotake Satō (Ind.) | 1947 | Zenjirō Hirano (Democratic) |
| Naotake Satō (Ind.) | 1950 | Tetsuo Kudō (Liberal) |
| Naotake Satō (Ryokufūkai) | 1953 | Tetsuo Kudō (Liberal) |
| Naotake Satō (Ryokufūkai) | 1953 by-el. | Junzo Sasamori (Progressive) |
| Naotake Satō (Ryokufūkai) | 1956 | Junzo Sasamori (LDP) |
| Naotake Satō (Ryokufūkai) | 1959 | Junzo Sasamori (LDP) |
| Naotake Satō (Ryokufūkai) | 1962 | Junzo Sasamori (LDP) |
| Bunji Tsushima (LDP) | 1965 | Junzo Sasamori (LDP) |
| Bunji Tsushima (LDP) | 1968 | Tatsuo Yamazaki (Ind.) |
| Bunji Tsushima (LDP) | 1971 | Tatsuo Yamazaki (Ind.) |
| Iwazo Terashita (LDP) | 1973 by-el. | Tatsuo Yamazaki (Ind.) |
| Iwazo Terashita (LDP) | 1974 | Tatsuo Yamazaki (LDP) |
| Iwazo Terashita (LDP) | 1977 | Tatsuo Yamazaki (LDP) |
| Kanpei Matsuo (LDP) | 1980 by-el. | Tatsuo Yamazaki (LDP) |
| Kanpei Matsuo (LDP) | 1980 | Tatsuo Yamazaki (LDP) |
| Kanpei Matsuo (LDP) | 1983 | Tatsuo Yamazaki (LDP) |
| Kanpei Matsuo (LDP) | 1986 | Tatsuo Yamazaki (Ind.) |
| Takao Mikami (Ind.) | 1989 | Tatsuo Yamazaki (Ind.) |
| Takao Mikami (Ind.) | 1991 by-el. | Kanpei Matsuo (Liberal National Congress) |
| Takao Mikami (Ind.) | 1992 | Kanpei Matsuo (LDP) |
| Tsutomu Yamazaki (New Frontier) | 1995 | Kanpei Matsuo (LDP) |
| Tsutomu Yamazaki (New Frontier) | 1998 | Masami Tanabu (Ind.) |
| Tsutomu Yamazaki (LDP) | 2001 | Masami Tanabu (Ind.) |
| Tsutomu Yamazaki (LDP) | 2004 | Masami Tanabu (DPJ) |
| Kōji Hirayama (DPJ) | 2007 | Masami Tanabu (DPJ) |
| Kōji Hirayama (DPJ) | 2010 | Tsutomu Yamazaki (LDP) |
| Motome Takisawa (LDP) | 2013 | Tsutomu Yamazaki (LDP) |
| Motome Takisawa (LDP) | 2016 | Masayo Tanabu (DP) |
| Motome Takisawa (LDP) | 2019 | Masayo Tanabu (DP) |
| Motome Takisawa (LDP) | 2022 | Masayo Tanabu (CDP) |
| Masumi Fukushi (CDP) | 2025 | Masayo Tanabu (CDP) |

== Election results ==
2025: Aomori at-large 1 seat
| Party | Candidate | Votes | % | ±% |
|---|---|---|---|---|
| CDP | Masumi Fukushi | 214,613 | 39.39 | ▼14.06 |
| LDP | Motome Takisawa | 197,966 | 36.34 | ▼5.39 |
| Sanseitō | Tsutomu Katō | 91,083 | 16.72 | ▲14.09 |
| JCP | Yūko Ogino | 32,317 | 5.93 | new |
| Anti-NHK | Akira Sasaki | 8,837 | 1.62 | ▼0.57 |
| Turnout | | | 54.22 | ▲4.73 |
| Registered electors | | 1,028,060 | | |
| Party total seats | | Won | Total | Change |
| Constitutional Democratic Party | | 1 | 2 | ▲1 |
| Liberal Democratic Party | | 0 | 0 | ▼1 |

2022
| Party | Candidate | Votes | % | ±% |
|---|---|---|---|---|
| CDP | Masayo Tanabu | 277,009 | 53.45 | New |
| Liberal Democratic | Naohito Saito | 216,265 | 41.73 | |
| Sanseitō | Eitaro Nakajō | 13,607 | 2.63 | New |
| Anti-NHK | Akira Sasaki | 11,335 | 2.19 | |
| Registered electors | | 1,073,060 | | |
| Turnout | | | 49.49 | ▲6.55 |

2019
| Party | Candidate | Votes | % | ±% |
|---|---|---|---|---|
| Liberal Democratic | Motome Takisawa | 239,757 | 51.5 | +0.2 |
| CDP | Satoru Odagiri | 206,582 | 44.4 | − |
| Anti-NHK | Hinako Koyama | 19,310 | 4.1 | − |
| Turnout | | 1,109,104 | 42,94% | ▼12.37 |

2016
| Party | Candidate | Votes | % | ±% |
|---|---|---|---|---|
| Democratic | Masayo Tanabu | 302,867 | 49.2 | New |
| Liberal Democratic | Tsutomu Yamazaki | 294,815 | 47.9 | − |
| Happiness Realization Party | Yuuki Mikuni | 18,071 | 2.9 | − |
| Turnout | | 1,140,629 | 55,31% | |

2013
| Party | Candidate | Votes | % | ±% |
|---|---|---|---|---|
| LDP | Motome Takisawa (endorsed by Komeito) | 261,575 | 51.3 | |
| People's Life | Kōji Hirayama (endorsed by Social Democratic Party, Green Wind) | 76,432 | 15.0 | |
| Your | Rina Hatano | 63,528 | 12.5 | |
| Independent | Shin Kudo (endorsed by Democratic Party) | 53,062 | 10.4 | |
| JCP | Yo Yoshimata | 48,290 | 9.5 | |
| Happiness Realization | Akihiro Ishita | 6,659 | 1.3 | |
| Turnout | | | | |

2010
| Party | Candidate | Votes | % | ±% |
|---|---|---|---|---|
| LDP | Tsutomu Yamazaki | 287,385 | 46.8 | |
| Democratic | Rina Hatano (Endorsed by People's New Party) | 222,875 | 36.3 | |
| Sunrise | Sekio Masuta | 49,102 | 8.0 | |
| JCP | Yo Yoshimata | 31,040 | 5.1 | |
| Social Democratic | Kiyohiko Yamada | 23,803 | 3.9 | |
| Turnout | | | | |

== See also ==
- Aomori 1st district - one of 4 districts that represents Aomori Prefecture in the House of Representatives
- Aomori 2nd district - one of 4 districts that represents Aomori Prefecture in the House of Representatives
- Aomori 3rd district - one of 4 districts that represents Aomori Prefecture in the House of Representatives
