= Suwanotaira Station =

Railway station in Nanbu, Aomori Prefecture, Japan

Suwanotaira Station 諏訪ノ平駅
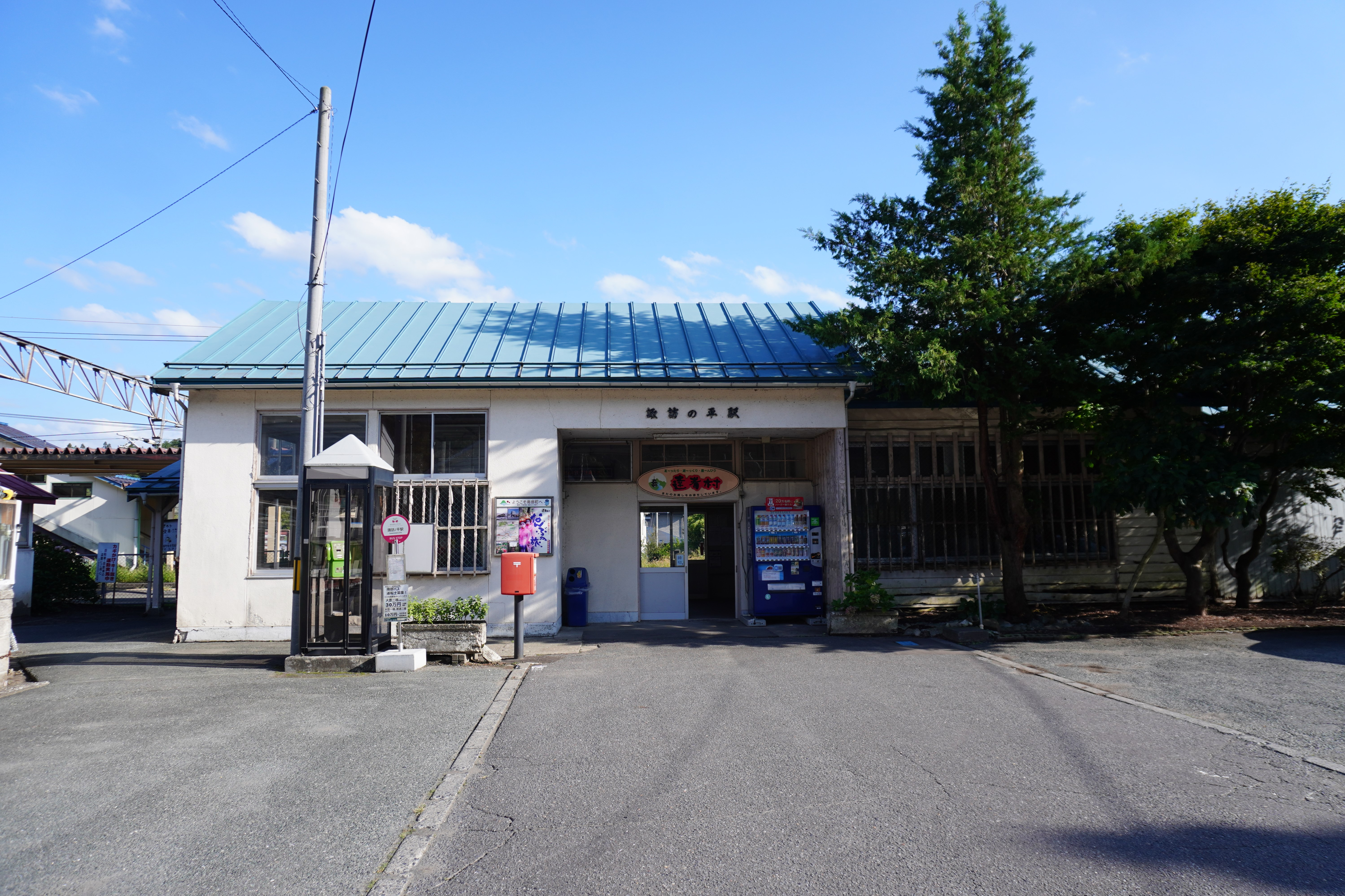
- Suwanotaira Station in September 2023

General information
- Location: Tamagake, Nanbu-machi, Sannohe-gun, Aomori-ken 039-0101; Japan
- Coordinates: 40°24′54″N 141°18′17″E
- System: Regional rail station
- Operator: Aoimori Railway
- Line: ■ Aoimori Railway Line
- Distance: 9.5 km from Metoki
- Platforms: 2 side platforms
- Tracks: 2

Construction
- Structure type: At grade

Other information
- Status: Unstaffed
- Website: Official website

History
- Opened: January 15, 1933

Services
Preceding station	Aoimori Railway	Following station
Sannohe towards Metoki	Aoimori Railway Line	Kenyoshi towards Aomori
Location
- Location within Aomori Prefecture Location within Japan

Suwanotaira Station (諏訪ノ平駅, Suwanotaira-eki) is a railway station on the Aoimori Railway Line in the town of Nanbu in Aomori Prefecture, Japan, operated by the third sector railway operator Aoimori Railway Company.

== Lines ==
Suwanotaira Station is served by the Aoimori Railway Line, and is 9.5 kilometers from the terminus of the line at Metoki Station. It is 626.8 kilometers from Tokyo Station.

== Station layout ==
Suwanotaira Station has two ground-level opposed side platforms serving two tracks connected to the station building by a footbridge. The station is unattended.

=== Platforms ===
1	■ Aoimori Railway Line	for Hachinohe and Aomori
3	■ Aoimori Railway Line	for Sannohe and Morioka

== History ==
Suwanotaira Station was opened on January 15, 1933 as a station of the Tohoku Main Line on the Japan National Railways (JNR). Freight operations were discontinued from April 1962. The station has been unattended since October 1979. With the privatization of the JNR on April 1, 1987, it came under the operational control of JR East. It came under the control of the Aoimori Railway Line on December 1, 2002.

== Surrounding area ==
- National Route 4
- Mabechi River

== See also ==
- List of railway stations in Japan
