= Tomai Station =

Railway station in Ninohe, Iwate Prefecture, Japan

Tomai Station 斗米駅
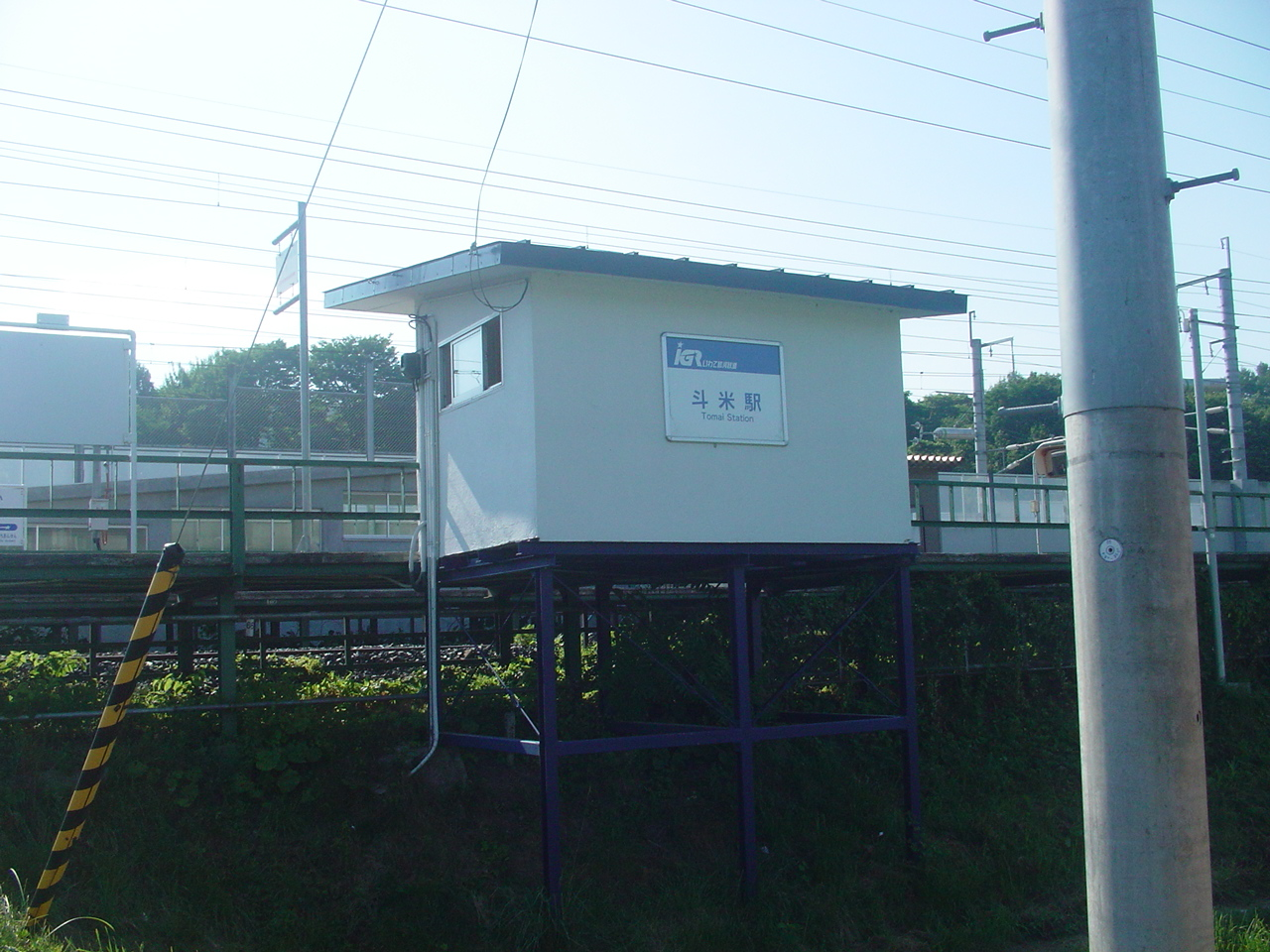
- Tomai Station in July 2007

General information
- Location: Maezawa Sawauchi 176-2, Ninohe-shi, Iwate-ken 028-6104; Japan
- Coordinates: 40°17′08″N 141°17′28″E
- Operator: Iwate Galaxy Railway Company
- Line: ■ Iwate Ginga Railway Line
- Distance: 73.7 km from Morioka
- Platforms: 2 side platforms
- Tracks: 2

Construction
- Structure type: At grade

Other information
- Status: Unstaffed
- Website: Official website

History
- Opened: 1 October 1966

Passengers
- FY2015: 143 daily
Location
- Location within Japan

Tomai Station (斗米駅, Tomai-eki) is a railway station on the Iwate Ginga Railway Line in Ninohe, Iwate Prefecture, Japan, operated by the third-sector railway operator Iwate Ginga Railway Company.

== Lines ==
Tomai Station is served by the Iwate Ginga Railway Line, and is located 73.7 kilometers from the terminus of the line at Morioka Station and 609.0 kilometers from Tokyo Station.

== Station layout ==
Tomai Station has two opposed side platforms connected by an underground passage. There is no station building, but only small shelters on the platforms. The station is unattended.

=== Platforms ===
1	■ Iwate Ginga Railway Line	for Ninohe and Morioka
2	■ Iwate Ginga Railway Line	for Sannohe and Ninohe

== Adjacent stations ==
«	Service	»
Iwate Ginga Railway Line
Ninohe	-	Kintaichi-Onsen

== History ==
The station opened on 1 October 1966. The station was absorbed into the JR East network upon the privatization of Japanese National Railways (JNR) on 1 April 1987, and was transferred to the Iwate Ginga Railway on 1 September 2002.

== Passenger statistics ==
In fiscal 2015, the station was used by an average of 143 passengers daily.

== Surrounding area ==
- National Route 4
- Mabechi River

== See also ==
- List of railway stations in Japan
