= Tomabechi Station =

Railway station in Nanbu, Aomori Prefecture, Japan

Tomabechi Station 苫米地駅
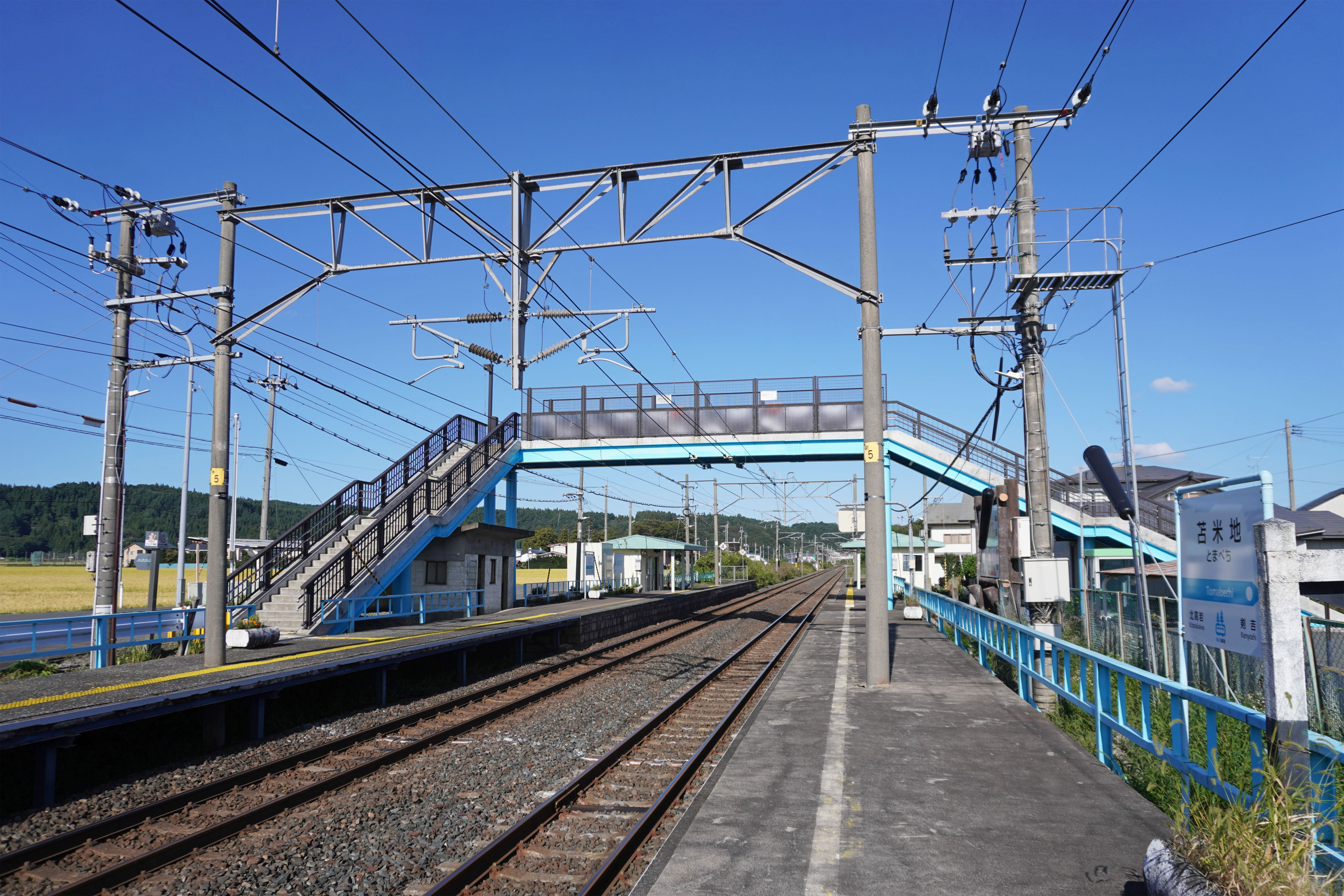
- Tomabechi Station in September 2023

General information
- Location: Tomabechi, Nanbu-machi, Sannohe-gun, Aomori-ken 039-0802; Japan
- Coordinates: 40°28′01″N 141°22′30″E
- System: Regional rail station
- Operator: Aoimori Railway
- Line: ■ Aoimori Railway Line
- Distance: 18.2 km from Metoki
- Platforms: 2 side platforms
- Tracks: 2

Construction
- Structure type: At grade

Other information
- Status: Unstaffed
- Website: Official website

History
- Opened: August 15, 1961

Services
Preceding station	Aoimori Railway	Following station
Kenyoshi towards Metoki	Aoimori Railway Line	Kitatakaiwa towards Aomori
Location
- Location within Aomori Prefecture Location within Japan

Tomabechi Station (苫米地駅, Tomabechi-eki) is a railway station on the Aoimori Railway Line in the town of Nanbu in Aomori Prefecture, Japan, operated by the third sector railway operator Aoimori Railway Company.

== Lines ==
Tomabechi Station is served by the Aoimori Railway Line, and is 18.2 kilometers from the terminus of the line at Metoki Station. It is 635.5 kilometers from Tokyo Station.

== Station layout ==
Tomabechi Station has two ground-level opposed side platforms serving two tracks connected to the station building by a footbridge. The station is unattended.

=== Platforms ===
1	■ Aoimori Railway Line	for Hachinohe and Aomori
2	■ Aoimori Railway Line	for Sannohe and Morioka

== History ==
Tomabechi Station was opened on August 15, 1961 as a station of the Tohoku Main Line on the Japan National Railways (JNR). Freight operations were discontinued from April 1962. With the privatization of the JNR on April 1, 1987, it came under the operational control of JR East. It came under the control of the Aoimori Railway Line on December 1, 2002.

== Surrounding area ==
- National Route 104
- Mabechi River

== See also ==
- List of railway stations in Japan
