= Kintaichi-Onsen Station =

Railway station in Ninohe, Iwate Prefecture, Japan

Kintaichi-Onsen Station 金田一温泉駅
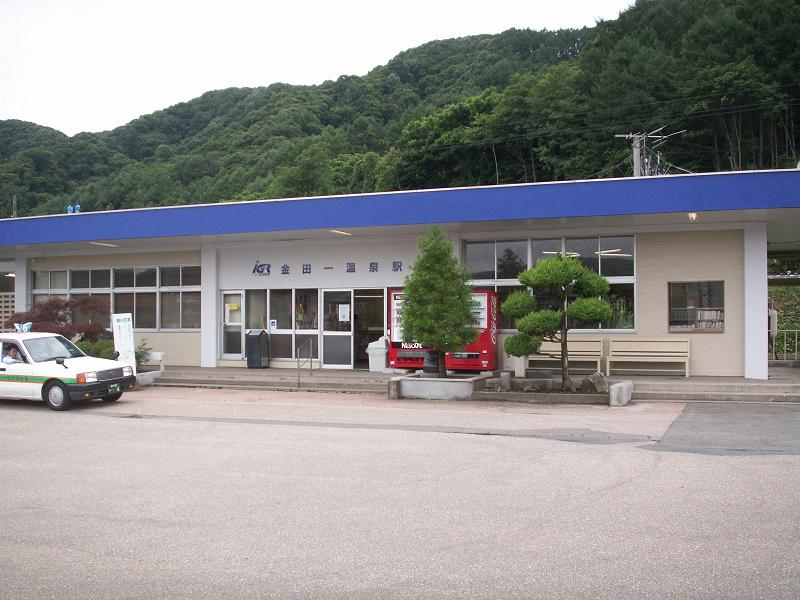
- Kintaichi-Onsen Station in July 2007

General information
- Location: 14-1 Kintaichi Mizunashi, Ninohe-shi, Iwate-ken 028-5711; Japan
- Coordinates: 40°19′23″N 141°18′14″E
- Operator: Iwate Galaxy Railway Company
- Line: ■ Iwate Ginga Railway Line
- Distance: 78.3 km from Morioka
- Platforms: 1 island + 1 side platform
- Tracks: 3

Construction
- Structure type: At grade

Other information
- Status: Staffed
- Website: Official website

History
- Opened: 18 October 1909
- Former names: Kintaichi (until February 1987)

Passengers
- FY2015: 186 daily
Location
- Location within Japan

Kintaichi-Onsen Station (金田一温泉駅, Kintaichi-Onsen-eki) is a railway station on the Iwate Ginga Railway Line in the city of Ninohe, Iwate Prefecture, Japan, operated by the third-sector railway operator Iwate Ginga Railway Company.

== Lines ==
Kintaichi-Onsen Station is served by the Iwate Ginga Railway Line, and is located 78.4 kilometers from the terminus of the line at Morioka Station and 613.7 kilometers from Tokyo Station.

== Station layout ==
Kintaichi-Onsen Station has one island platform and a single side platform connected to the station building by a footbridge.

=== Platforms ===
1	■ Iwate Ginga Railway Line	for Ninohe and Morioka
2	■ Iwate Ginga Railway Line	(passing loop)
3	■ Iwate Ginga Railway Line	for Sannohe and Ninohe

== Adjacent stations ==
«	Service	»
Iwate Ginga Railway Line
Tomai	-	Metoki

== History ==
Kintaichi-Onsen Station opened on 18 October 1909 as Kintaichi Station (金田一駅, Kintaichi-eki) on the Japanese Government Railways (JGR). It was renamed Kintaichi-Onsen Station on 1 February 1987. The station was absorbed into the JR East network upon the privatization of the Japanese National Railways (JNR) on 1 April 1987, and was transferred to the Iwate Ginga Railway on 1 September 2002.

== Passenger statistics ==
In fiscal 2015, the station was used by an average of 186 passengers daily.

== Surrounding area ==
- Kintaichi Onsen
- Kintaichi Post Office

== Bus services ==
- JR Bus Tohoku
  - For Ninohe Station
  - For Karumai
- Nanbu Bus
  - For Sannohe
  - For Ichinohe Station via Ninohe Station

== See also ==
- List of railway stations in Japan
