= Nanbu, Aomori =

Nanbu 南部町
- Town
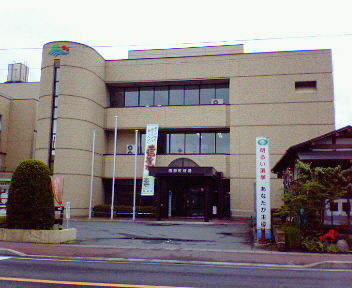
- Nanbu Town Hall

- Flag Seal
- Location of Nanbu in Aomori Prefecture

- Location within Japan
- Coordinates: 40°25′14″N 141°18′49″E
- Country: Japan
- Region: Tōhoku
- Prefecture: Aomori
- District: Sannohe

Area
  - Total: 153.12 km^{2} (59.12 sq mi)

Population (December 1, 2025)
  - Total: 15,922
  - Density: 103.98/km^{2} (269.32/sq mi)
- Time zone: UTC+9 (Japan Standard Time)
- Phone number: 0178-84-2111
- Address: 23-1 Shimojuku, Sannohe-gun, Nanbu-machi, Aomori-ken 039-0802
- Website: Official website
- Symbols
- Bird: Japanese bush-warbler
- Flower: Peony
- Tree: Japanese red pine

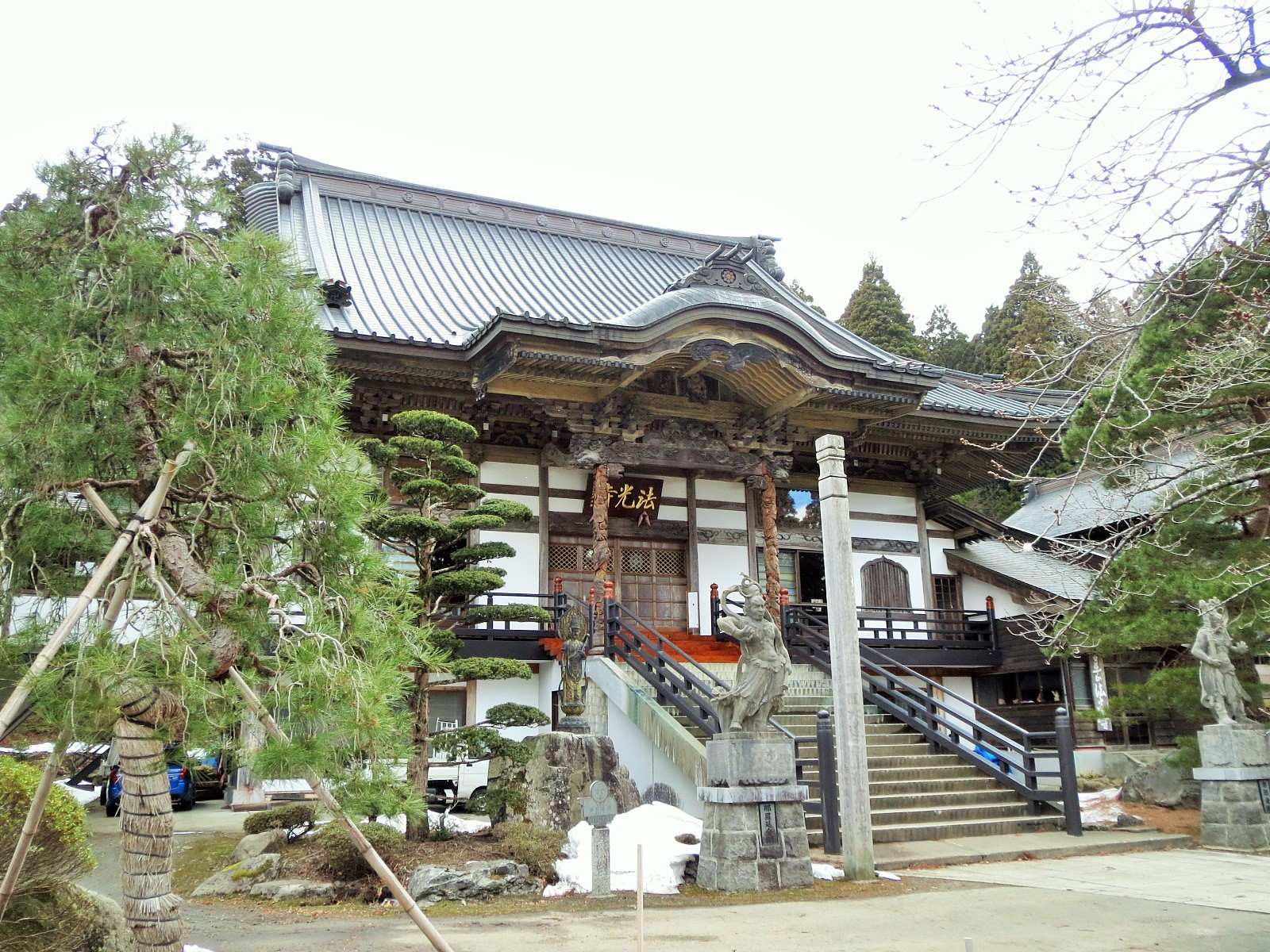
Hoko-ji, the clan temple of the Nanbu clan

Nanbu (南部町, Nanbu-chō) is a town located in Aomori Prefecture, Japan. As of 1 December 2025, the town had an estimated population of 15,922 in 7360 households, and a population density of 104 persons per km^{2} . The total area of the town is 153.12 square kilometres (59.12 sq mi).

== Geography ==
Nanbu is located in southeastern of Aomori Prefecture, in the eastern part of Sannohe District. The Mabechi River flows from east to west in the center of the town. The terrain is flat along the Mabuchi River, but there are few flatlands and most of the town is hilly. In the southern part of the town, Mt. Nakui has an elevation of 615 meters.

=== Neighbouring municipalities ===
Aomori Prefecture

- Sannohe District
  - Gonohe
  - Sannohe
  - Shingō
- Hachinohe

Iwate Prefecture

- Karumai
- Ninohe

=== Climate ===
The town has a cold maritime climate characterized by cool short summers and long cold winters with heavy snowfall (Köppen climate classification Cfa). The average annual temperature in Nanbu is 10.0 °C. The average annual rainfall is 1198 mm with September as the wettest month. The temperatures are highest on average in August, at around 23.0 °C, and lowest in January, at around -2.1 °C.

== Demographics ==
Per Japanese census data, the population of Nambu has declined over the past 60 years.

Historical population

Year	Pop.	±% p.a.
1920	18,317	—
1930	20,440	+1.10%
1940	21,618	+0.56%
1950	27,288	+2.36%
1960	27,196	−0.03%
1970	24,997	−0.84%

Year	Pop.	±% p.a.
1980	24,495	−0.20%
1990	23,383	−0.46%
2000	22,596	−0.34%
2010	19,840	−1.29%
2020	16,809	−1.64%

== History ==
When the Nanbu clan relocated from Kai Province to their holdings in Mutsu Province in the early Muromachi period, they established their residence and clan temple in what is now the town of Nanbu. During the Edo period, the area was controlled by Morioka Domain and later by Hachinohe Domain. Hirasaki and Muko villages were created with the establishment of the modern municipalities system on April 1, 1889. These two villages merged on April 20, 1955, to create the village of Nanbu. Nanbu was elevated to town status on February 11, 1959. On January 1, 2006, Nanbu merged with Fukuchi and Nagawa into the new town of Nanbu.

== Government ==
Nanbu has a mayor-council form of government with a directly elected mayor and a unicameral town council of 16 members. Nanbu is part of Sannohe District which contributes three members to the Aomori Prefectural Assembly. In terms of national politics, the town is part of Aomori 2nd district of the lower house of the Diet of Japan.

== Education ==
Nanbu has three public elementary schools and three public middle school operated by the town government and one public high school operated by the Aomori Prefectural Board of Education.

== Economy ==
The economy of Nanbu is heavily dependent on agriculture, especially horticulture. The main crops are apples, grapes and European pears.

== Transportation ==
=== Railway ===
Aoimori Railway Company – Aoimori Railway Line

- Sannohe – Suwanotaira – Kenyoshi – Tomabechi

=== Highway ===
- National Route 4
- National Route 104

== Local attractions ==
- Ruins of Shōjujidate Castle, a National Historic Site
- Nakuidake Prefectural Natural Park
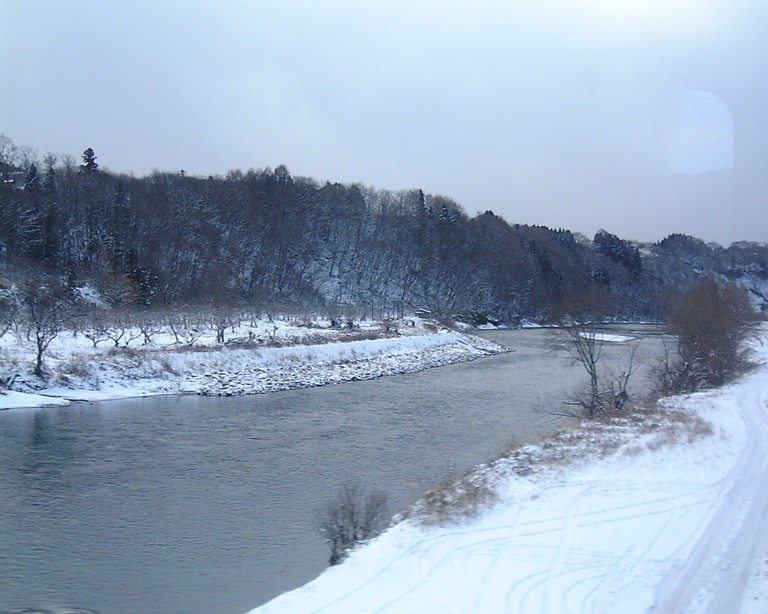
Mabechi River in Nanbu

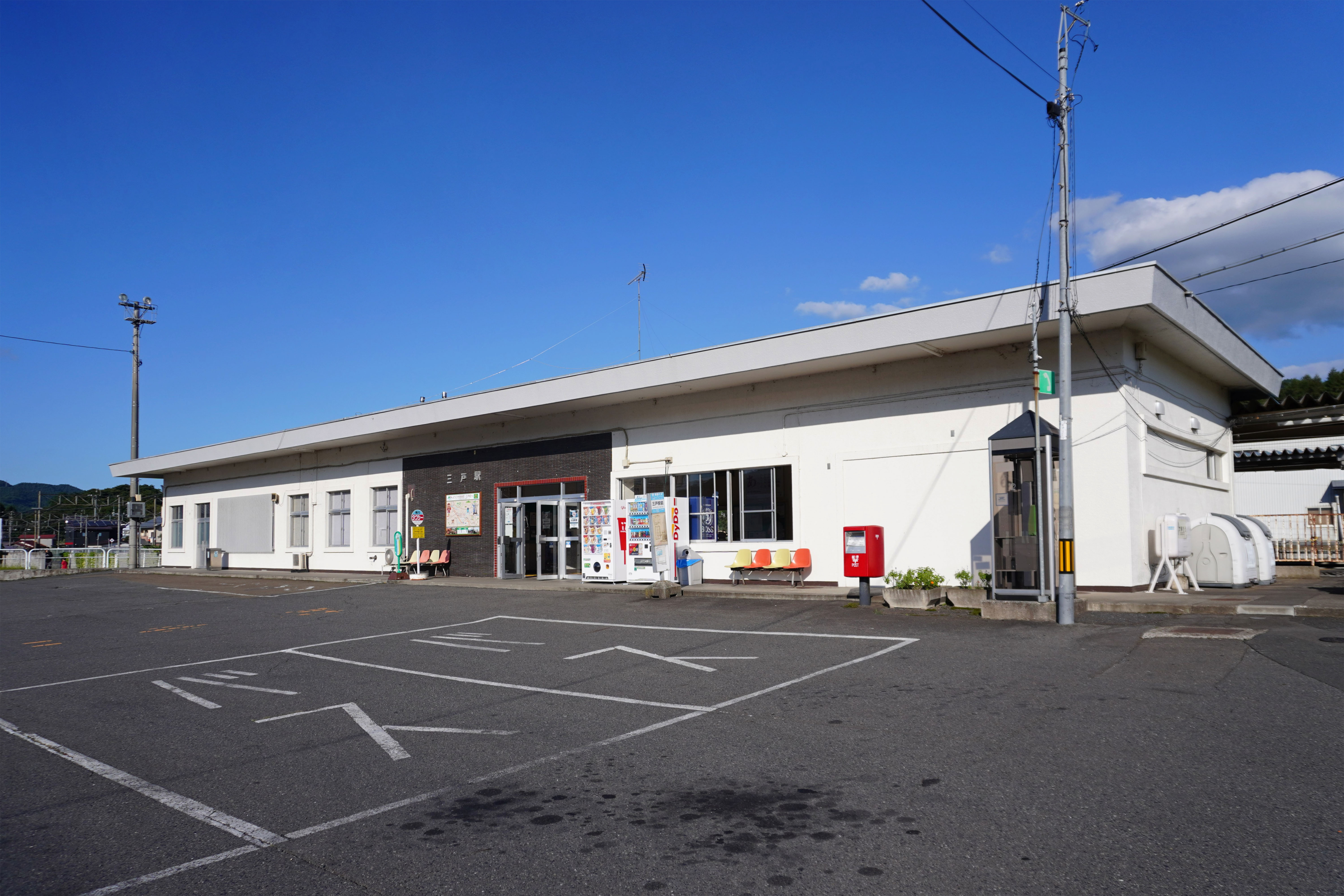
Sannohe train station

== Noted people from Nanbu ==
- Yoshimi Akaishi, voice actor
- Hirotaka Neichi, professional baseball player
- Satoru Sakamoto, musician
- Tsutomu Sakamoto, cyclist, bronze medal winner in 1984 Summer Olympics
