= Sannohe Tunnel =

Railway tunnel in Honshu, Japan

Sannohe Railway Tunnel
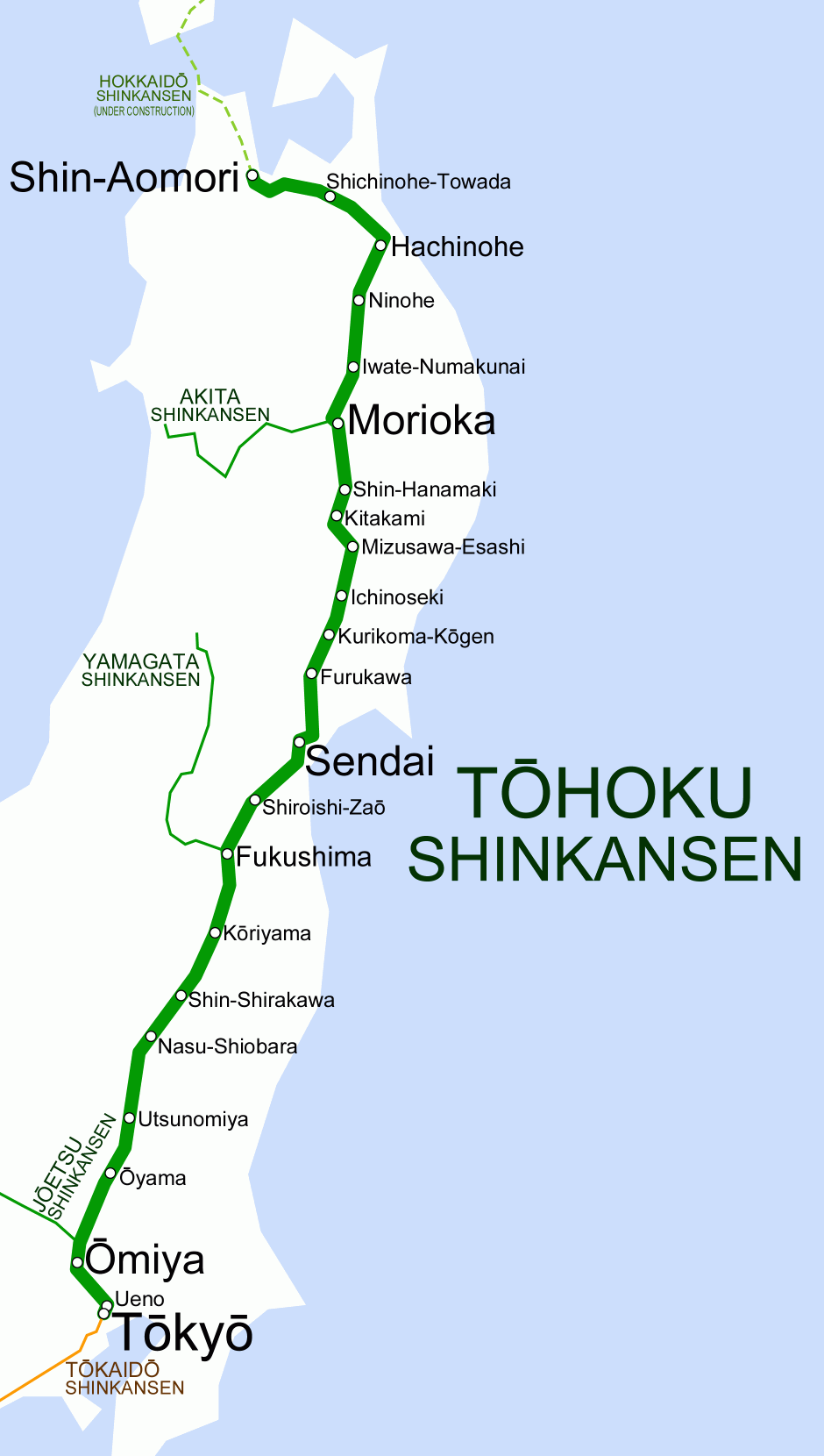
- Sannohe Tunnel on Tohoku Shinkansen line
- Interactive map of Sannohe Railway Tunnel

Overview
- Line: Tohoku Shinkansen
- Location: between Ninohe Station and Hachinohe Station
- Coordinates: 40°26′10.896″N 141°23′11.9502″E
- Status: active

Operation
- Opened: 2002
- Operator: East Japan Railway Company
- Traffic: Railway
- Character: Passenger and Freight

Technical
- Line length: 8,250 m (27,070 ft)
- No. of tracks: 2

Sannohe Tunnel (三戸トンネル, Sannohe tonneru) is a tunnel on JR's Tohoku Shinkansen located between Ninohe Station (Iwate Prefecture) and Hachinohe Station in Nanbu town, Sannohe, Aomori Prefecture with total length of 8.250 km. It was built and completed in 2002.

== See also ==
- List of tunnels in Japan
- Seikan Tunnel undersea tunnel between Honshu-Hokkaido islands
- Kanmon Railway Tunnel undersea tunnel between Honshu-Kyushu islands
- Sakhalin–Hokkaido Tunnel
- Bohai Strait tunnel
