= Fukuchi, Aomori =

Fukuchi 福地村
- Former municipality
- Flag Emblem

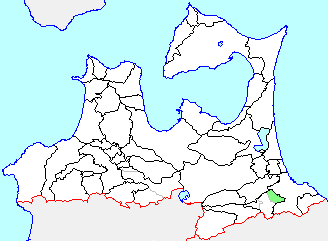
- Location of Fukuchi in Aomori Prefecture

- Location in Japan
- Coordinates: 40°28′0.3″N 141°22′55.9″E
- Country: Japan
- Region: Tōhoku
- Prefecture: Aomori Prefecture
- District: Sannohe
- Merged: March 1, 2005 (now part of Nanbu)

Area
  - Total: 40.18 km^{2} (15.51 sq mi)

Population (January 1, 2006)
  - Total: 6,991
  - Density: 174/km^{2} (450/sq mi)
- Time zone: UTC+09:00 (JST)
- Symbols
- Bird: Japanese bush warbler
- Flower: Chrysanthemum
- Tree: Japanese zelkova

Fukuchi (福地村, Fukuchi-mura) was a village located in Sannohe District in northern Aomori Prefecture, Japan.

Fukuchi Village was formed on 1 April 1955, when the villages of Tanabe and Jibiki merged.

Fukuchi, along with the town of Nagawa (also from Sannohe District), was merged into the expanded town of Nanbu on 1 January 2006, and thus no longer exists as an independent municipality.

Fukuchi, located in central Aomori Prefecture, had an economy based primarily on agriculture, specifically garlic cultivation. It also served as a bedroom community for nearby Hachinohe.

At the time of its merger, the village had an estimated population of 6,991 and a density of 174 persons per km^{2}. The total area was 40.18 km^{2}.

Fukuchi was served by Tomabechi Station on the Aoimori Railway Line, and by National Route 104.
