= Tsutomu Yamazaki (politician) =

Japanese politician (1947–2021)

- 山崎 力
- Official portrait, 2005

Member of the House of Councillors
- In office 25 July 2010 – 26 July 2016
- Preceded by: Masami Tanabu
- Succeeded by: Masayo Tanabu
- Constituency: Aomori at-large
- In office 23 July 1995 – 22 July 2007
- Preceded by: Takao Mikami
- Succeeded by: Kōji Hirayama
- Constituency: Aomori at-large

Personal details
- Born: 8 May 1947 Aomori City, Aomori, Japan
- Died: 2 June 2021 (aged 74) Aomori City, Aomori, Japan
- Party: Liberal Democratic (2000–2021)
- Other political affiliations: Japan New (1992–1994); New Frontier (1994–1998); Reform Club (1998–2000)
- Education: Chuo University

Tsutomu Yamazaki (山崎 力; 8 May 1947 – 2 June 2021) was a Japanese politician. He was a member of the House of Councillors from 1995 until 2007 and again from 2010 until 2016. Yamazaki was born in Aomori, Japan.

Yamazaki died from COVID-19 at a hospital in Aomori on 2 June 2021, at age 74.
