= Tadamori Ōshima =

Japanese politician

- 大島 理森
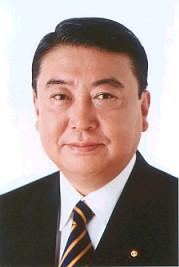
- Official portrait, 2002

Speaker of the House of Representatives
- In office 21 April 2015 – 14 October 2021
- Monarchs: Akihito; Naruhito
- Deputy: Tatsuo Kawabata; Hirotaka Akamatsu
- Preceded by: Nobutaka Machimura
- Succeeded by: Hiroyuki Hosoda
Ministerial offices
Minister of Agriculture, Forestry and Fisheries
In office 30 September 2002 – 1 April 2003
Prime Minister	Junichiro Koizumi
Preceded by	Tsutomu Takebe
Succeeded by	Yoshiyuki Kamei
Minister of Education
In office 4 July 2000 – 5 December 2000
Prime Minister	Yoshirō Mori
Preceded by	Hirofumi Nakasone
Succeeded by	Nobutaka Machimura
Director-General of the Science and Technology Agency
In office 4 July 2000 – 5 December 2000
Prime Minister	Yoshirō Mori
Preceded by	Hirofumi Nakasone
Succeeded by	Nobutaka Machimura
Director-General of the Environmental Agency
In office 8 August 1995 – 11 January 1996
Prime Minister	Tomiichi Murayama
Preceded by	Sohei Miyashita
Succeeded by	Sukio Iwatare
Deputy Chief Cabinet Secretary (Political affairs)
In office 2 February 1990 – 5 November 1991
Prime Minister	Toshiki Kaifu
Preceded by	Takao Fujimoto
Succeeded by	Motoji Kondo
Party political offices
Vice President of the Liberal Democratic Party
In office 9 September 2010 – 28 September 2012
President	Sadakazu Tanigaki
Secretary-General	Nobuteru Ishihara
Preceded by	Taku Yamasaki (2003)
Succeeded by	Masahiko Kōmura
Secretary-General of the Liberal Democratic Party
In office 29 September 2009 – 9 September 2010
President	Sadakazu Tanigaki
Preceded by	Hiroyuki Hosoda
Succeeded by	Nobuteru Ishihara

Member of the House of Representatives
- In office 19 December 1983 – 14 October 2021
- Preceded by: Shūichi Takenaka
- Succeeded by: Junichi Kanda
- Constituency: Aomori 1st (1983–1996); Aomori 3rd (1996–2017); Aomori 2nd (2017–2021)

Member of the Aomori Prefectural Assembly
- In office 23 April 1975 – June 1980
- Constituency: Hachinohe City

Personal details
- Born: 6 September 1946 (age 80) Hachinohe, Aomori, Japan
- Party: Liberal Democratic
- Education: Keio University

Tadamori Ōshima (Japanese: 大島 理森, Hepburn: Ōshima Tadamori; born 6 September 1946) is a former Japanese politician who served as the Speaker of the House of Representatives from 2015 to 2021. A member of the Liberal Democratic Party, he previously served as the Minister of Agriculture, Forestry and Fisheries, and Minister of Education, Culture, Sports, Science and Technology. He is affiliated to the revisionist lobby Nippon Kaigi.

== Career ==
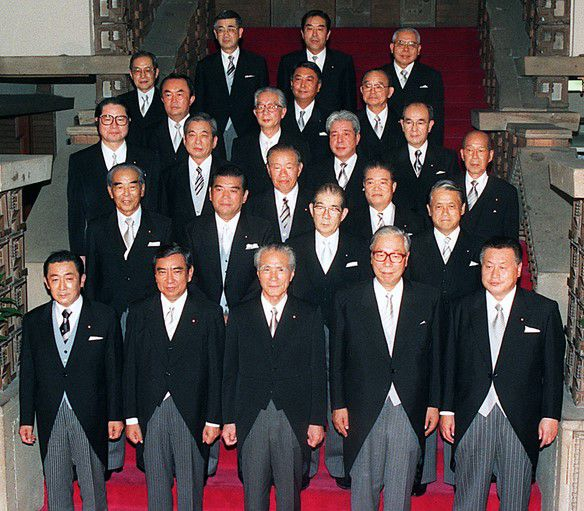
Ōshima with members of the Murayama Reshuffled Cabinet (at the Prime Minister's Official Residence on 8 August 1995)

A native of Hachinohe, Aomori and graduate of Keio University, he worked at the national newspaper Mainichi Shimbun from 1970 to 1974, and was elected to the Aomori Prefectural Assembly in 1975. He was elected to the House of Representatives for the first time in 1983 after an unsuccessful run in 1980.

He served as Speaker of the House from 2015 to 2021.

After his political career, he was appointed as a member of the Yokozuna Deliberation Council in January 2023. He was elected its chairman in January 2025.

== Election history ==
Election	Age	District	Political party	Number of votes	election results
1980 Japanese general election	33	Aomori 1st district	LDP	63,958	lost
1983 Japanese general election	37	Aomori 1st district	LDP	98,275	winning
1986 Japanese general election	39	Aomori 1st district	LDP	100,653	winning
1990 Japanese general election	43	Aomori 1st district	LDP	84,302	winning
1993 Japanese general election	46	Aomori 1st district	LDP	102,921	winning
1996 Japanese general election	50	Aomori 3rd district	LDP	96,628	winning
2000 Japanese general election	53	Aomori 3rd district	LDP	93,602	winning
2003 Japanese general election	57	Aomori 3rd district	LDP	86,909	winning
2005 Japanese general election	59	Aomori 3rd district	LDP	90,925	winning
2009 Japanese general election	62	Aomori 3rd district	LDP	90,176	winning
2012 Japanese general election	66	Aomori 3rd district	LDP	74,946	winning
2014 Japanese general election	68	Aomori 3rd district	LDP	59,280	winning
2017 Japanese general election	71	Aomori 2nd district	LDP	133,545	winning

Political offices
Preceded by Takao Fujimoto	Deputy Chief Cabinet Secretary; 1990–1991	Succeeded by Motoji Kondo
Preceded by Sohei Miyashita	Director-General of the Environment Agency; 1995–1996	Succeeded by Sukio Iwatare
Preceded by Hirofumi Nakasone	Minister of Education; 2000	Succeeded by Nobutaka Machimura
Preceded by Hirofumi Nakasone	Director-General of the Science and Technology Agency; 2000	Succeeded by Nobutaka Machimura
Preceded by Hirofumi Nakasone	Chair of the Atomic Energy Commission; 2000	Succeeded by Nobutaka Machimura
Preceded by Tsutomu Takebe	Minister of Agriculture, Forestry and Fisheries; 2002–2003	Succeeded by Yoshiyuki Kamei
House of Representatives (Japan)
Preceded by Hidenao Nakagawa	Chair of the Committee on Rules and Administration; 1999–2000	Succeeded by Takao Fujii
Preceded by Akira Amari	Chair of the Committee on Budget; 2005–2006; 2014–2015	Succeeded by Kazuyoshi Kaneko
Preceded by Toshihiro Nikai	Chair of the Committee on Budget; 2005–2006; 2014–2015	Succeeded by Takeo Kawamura
Preceded by Nobutaka Machimura	Speaker of the House of Representatives of Japan; 2015–2021	Succeeded by Hiroyuki Hosoda
Party political offices
Preceded by Hiroyuki Hosoda	Secretary-General of the Liberal Democratic Party; 2009–2010	Succeeded by Nobuteru Ishihara
Vacant Title last held by Taku Yamasaki	Vice President of the Liberal Democratic Party; 2010–2012	Succeeded by Masahiko Kōmura
Preceded by Masahiko Kōmura	Head of Banchō Seisaku Kenkyūjo; 2012–2015	Succeeded by Akiko Santo
Other offices
Preceded by Masayuki Yamauchi	Chairman of the Yokozuna Deliberation Council; 2025–present	Incumbent
