= Masayo Tanabu =

Japanese politician (born 1969)

- 田名部 匡代
- Official portrait, 2011

Member of the House of Councillors
- Incumbent
- Assumed office 26 July 2016
- Preceded by: Tsutomu Yamazaki
- Constituency: Aomori at-large

Member of the House of Representatives
- In office 12 September 2005 – 16 November 2012
- Constituency: Tohoku PR
- In office 6 July 2003 – 10 October 2003
- Preceded by: Ichirō Hino
- Succeeded by: Multi-member district
- Constituency: Tohoku PR

Personal details
- Born: 10 July 1969 (age 57) Hachinohe, Aomori, Japan
- Party: CDP (since 2020)
- Other political affiliations: DPJ (2000–2016); DP (2016–2018); DPP (2018–2020)
- Parent: Masami Tanabu (father)
- Education: Tamagawa Gakuen Junior College for Women

Masayo Tanabu (田名部 匡代, Tanabu Masayo; born 10 July 1969) is a Japanese politician serving in the House of Councillors in the Diet (national legislature) as a member of the Constitutional Democratic Party of Japan.

== Career ==
A native of Hachinohe, Aomori and graduate of Tamagawa Gakugn Junior College for Women she was elected for the first time in 2003 after an unsuccessful run in 2000. Her father is the late Masami Tanabu, a member of House of Councilors.
