= Nagawa, Aomori =

Nagawa 名川町
- Former municipality
- Flag Seal

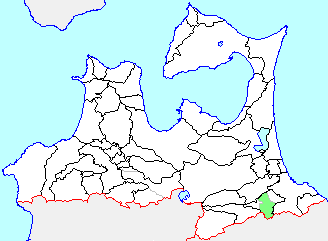
- Location of Nagawa in Aomori Prefecture

- Location in Japan
- Coordinates: 40°25′17″N 141°19′57.7″E
- Country: Japan
- Region: Tōhoku
- Prefecture: Aomori Prefecture
- District: Sannohe
- Merged: January 1, 2006 (now part of Nanbu)

Area
  - Total: 83.45 km^{2} (32.22 sq mi)

Population (February 1, 2006)
  - Total: 8,565
  - Density: 161.94/km^{2} (419.4/sq mi)
- Time zone: UTC+09:00 (JST)
- Symbols
- Flower: Hydrangea
- Tree: Maple

Nagawa (名川町, Nagawa-mura) was a town located in Sannohe District in central Aomori Prefecture, Japan. On January 1, 2006 Nagawa was merged into the neighboring town of Nanbu, and thus it no longer exists as an independent municipality.

Nakui Village (名久井村) was founded on April 1, 1889 from the merger of seven small hamlets, and neighboring Kitakawa Village (北川村) was likewise formed from the merger of three small hamlets. On July 29, 1955, Nakui and Kitakawa merged to form the town of Nagawa.

On January 1, 2006, Nagawa, along with the village of Fukuchi (also from Sannohe District), was merged into the expanded town of Nanbu and thus it no longer exists as an independent municipality.

An inland village, Nagawa had an agriculture-based economy, with raising of cherries predominating. At the time of its merger, Nagawahad an estimated population of 8,656 and a population density of 161.94 persons per km^{2}. The total area was 53.45 km^{2}. Nagawa was served by Japan National Route 4 and Japan National Route 104 highways, and by Kenyoshi Station on the Aoimori Railway Line.
