= Jun Tsushima =

Japanese politician

- 津島 淳
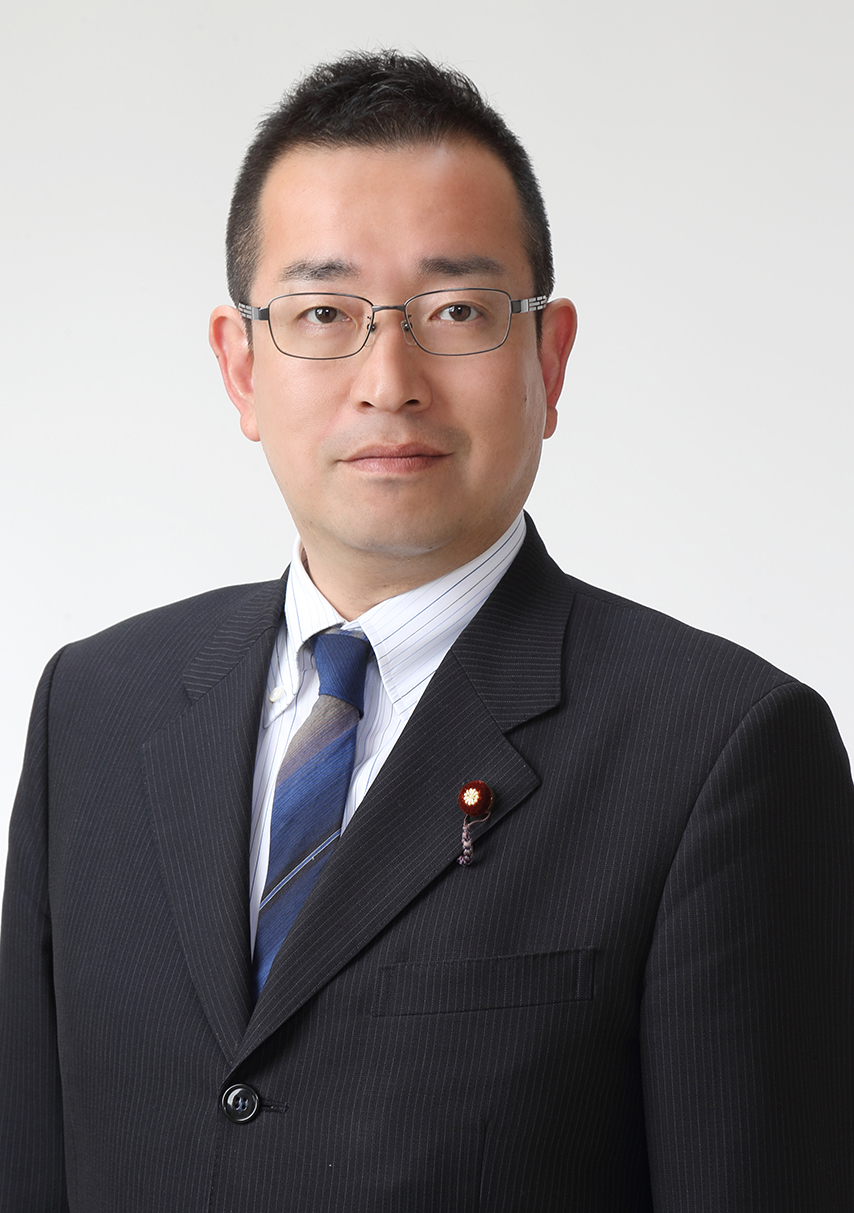
- Official portrait, 2014

Member of the House of Representatives
- Incumbent
- Assumed office 16 December 2012
- Preceded by: Hokuto Yokoyama
- Constituency: Aomori 1st (2012–2021); Tohoku PR (2021–2024); Aomori 1st (2024–present)

Personal details
- Born: 津島 淳 (Tsushima Jun); 18 October 1966 (age 60) Paris, France
- Party: Liberal Democratic
- Parents: Yūji Tsushima (father); Sonoko Tsushima (mother)
- Relatives: Osamu Dazai (grandfather); Kyōichi Tsushima (cousin)
- Education: Gakushuin University
- Website: Official website

Jun Tsushima (Japanese: 津島 淳, Hepburn: Tsushima Jun; born 18 October 1966) is a Japanese politician affiliated with the Liberal Democratic Party. He is a member of House of Representatives of Japan from Aomori Prefecture since 16 December 2012. He previously served as Vice-Minister of Land, Transport, Infrastructure and Tourism and also served as Vice-Minister of Cabinet Office in Third Abe Cabinet.

Tsushima's grandfather Osamu Dazai was a novelist and his father Yuji Tsushima was the member of House of Representatives (Japan), Minister of Health and Welfare and member of Liberal Democratic Party. His aunt Yūko Tsushima was a novelist like her father. His cousin Kyōichi Tsushima was a member of Democratic Party and member of House of Representatives of Japan from Tohoku Proportional District from 2009 to 2012
