= Akinori Eto =

Japanese politician (born 1955)

- 江渡 聡徳
- Official portrait, 2012

Minister of Defense
- In office 3 September 2014 – 24 December 2014
- Prime Minister: Shinzo Abe
- Preceded by: Itsunori Onodera
- Succeeded by: Gen Nakatani

Member of the House of Representatives
- Incumbent
- Assumed office 9 November 2003
- Preceded by: Shingo Mimura
- Constituency: Aomori 2nd (2003–2017); Tohoku PR (2017–2021); Aomori 1st (2021–2024); Tohoku PR (2024–present)
- In office 20 October 1996 – 25 June 2000
- Preceded by: Constituency established
- Succeeded by: Shingo Mimura
- Constituency: Aomori 2nd

Personal details
- Born: 12 October 1955 (age 71) Towada, Aomori, Japan
- Party: Liberal Democratic (Shikōkai)
- Education: Nihon University
- Website: Official website

Akinori Eto (江渡 聡徳, Eto Akinori; born 1955) is a Japanese politician and the former defense minister of Japan.

== Overview ==
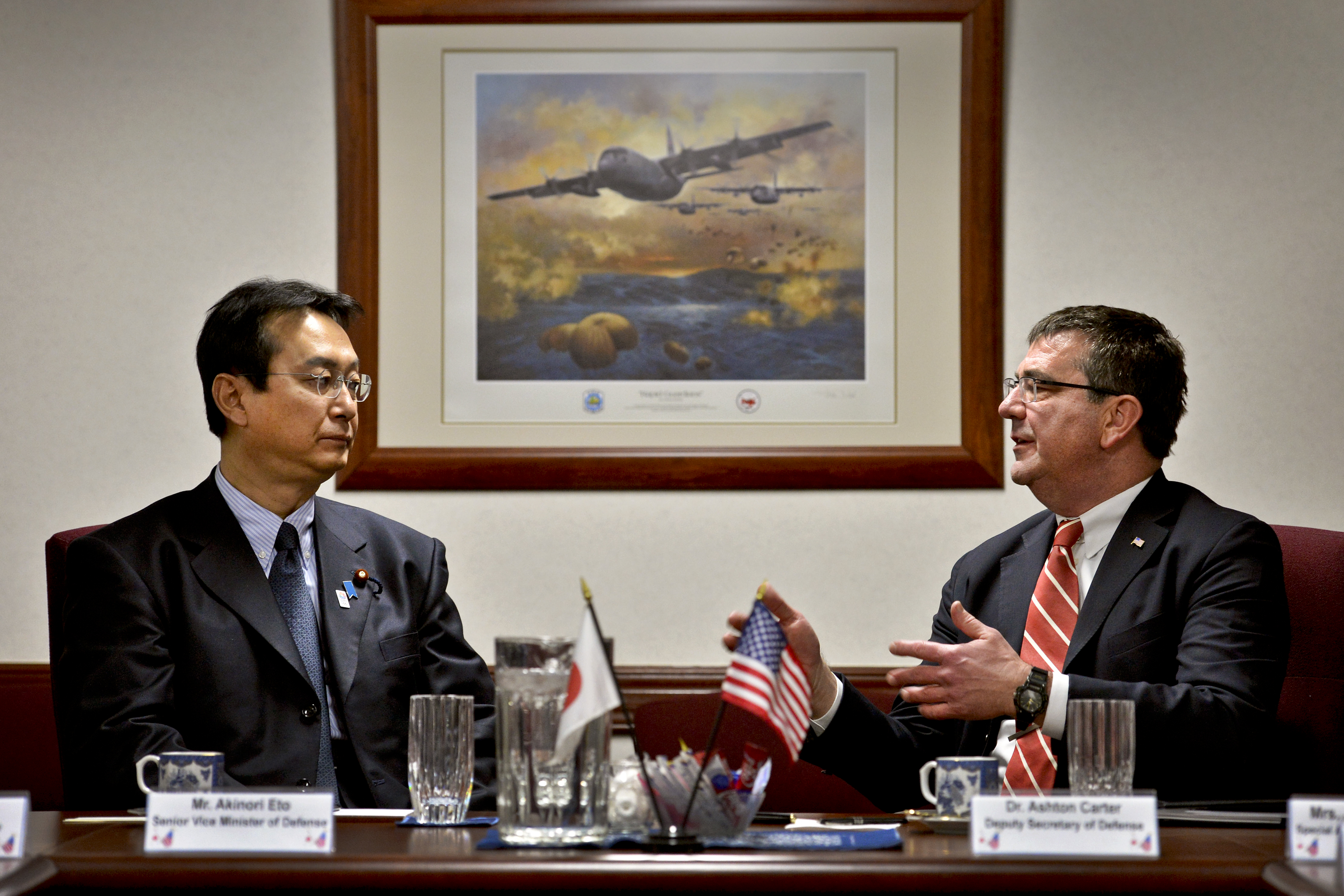
Eto with Ashton Carter (March 17, 2013)

Eto is a politician of the Liberal Democratic Party, a member of the House of Representatives in the Diet (national legislature). A native of Towada, Aomori, he attended Nihon University as both undergraduate and graduate. He was elected for the first time in 1996 but lost his seat in the re-election four years later. He was re-elected in 2003.

Eto was a short lived Minister of Defense starting from September, when he was appointed to his position due to a cabinet reshuffle but ending in December 2014. He declined continuing his post after the 2014 snap election due to being embroiled in a political funding scandal, where he and two other cabinet members was accused by opposition parties of alleged influence peddling, improper donations and/or issues in reporting on political funds. Eto denied the accusations. Analysts say his handling of questions relating to the scandal was considered too weak and was a major reason for Abe to replace him with Gen Nakatani, who is seen as a stronger figure.

Like Abe and most members of the Cabinet, he is affiliated with the openly revisionist organization Nippon Kaigi.

== Footnotes ==
Political offices
Preceded by Takahide Kimura	State Minister of Defense; 2007–2008	Succeeded by Seigo Kitamura
Preceded by Akihisa Nagashima	State Minister of Defense; 2012–2013	Succeeded by Ryota Takeda
Preceded by Itsunori Onodera	Minister of Defense; 2014	Succeeded by Gen Nakatani
House of Representatives (Japan)
Preceded by Ryota Takeda	Chair, Lower House Committee on Security; 2013–2014	Succeeded by Seigo Kitamura
