= Aomori 1st district =

Japan House of Representatives constituency

Aomori 1st District
- Parliamentary constituency for the Japanese House of Representatives
- Numbered map of Aomori Prefecture single-member districts
- Prefecture: Aomori
- Proportional District: Tohoku
- Electorate: 321,638 (2026)

Current constituency
- Created: 1994
- Seats: One
- Party: LDP
- Representative: Jun Tsushima
- Created from: Aomori's 1st "medium-sized" district
- Municipalities: The cities of Aomori and Mutsu and the Higashitsugaru, Shimokita, and part of the Kamikita districts

Aomori 1st district (青森県第1区, Aomori-ken dai-ikku or simply 青森1区, Aomori-ikku) is a single-member constituency of the House of Representatives in the national Diet of Japan. It is located in Northern Aomori and covers the cities of Aomori, Mutsu and the Higashitsugaru and Shimokita districts along with the northern half of the Kamikita District.

Before the introduction of parallel voting and single-member districts, Aomori city and East Tsugaru county had been part of the four-member Aomori 1st district.

Aomori is a "conservative kingdom", a Liberal Democratic stronghold; but in the landslide 2009 election Hokuto Yokoyama, center-left supported gubernatorial candidate in 2003, could win the 1st district and became the first Democrat to win a district in Aomori by beating Jun Tsushima from the Tsushima writer-politician dynasty from Kanagi town (in present-day Goshogawara). Tsushima had tried to succeed his retiring father, LDP faction leader Yūji Tsushima. Other members of the family included Representative, Councillor and Governor Bunji Tsushima (Seiyūkai/LDP – Aomori), Representative Kichirō Tazawa (LDP – Aomori), Representative Kyōichi Tsushima (LDP/DPJ – Tōhoku), Representative, Peer and Kanagi mayor Gen'emon Tsushima (Seiyūkai – Aomori), Kanagi mayor Eiji Tsushima and writers Shūji Tsushima (Osamu Dazai), Yūko Tsushima, Shizuko Ōta and Haruko Ōta. The second "inheritance" attempt in 2012 was successful.

== List of representatives ==
Representative	Party	Dates	Notes
Yūji Tsushima	LDP	1996–2009	Retired in 2009
Hokuto Yokoyama	DPJ	2009–2012	Joined PLF, then TPJ in 2012; failed re-election in the Tōhoku block
Hokuto Yokoyama	PLF	2012	Joined PLF, then TPJ in 2012; failed re-election in the Tōhoku block
Hokuto Yokoyama	TPJ	2012	Joined PLF, then TPJ in 2012; failed re-election in the Tōhoku block
Jun Tsushima	LDP	2012–2021	Elected in the Tohoku PR block in 2021
Akinori Eto	LDP	2021–2024	Former Representative of the 2nd district. Elected in the Tohoku PR block in 2024
Jun Tsushima	LDP	2024–	

== Election results ==
2026
Party	Candidate	Votes	%	±%
LDP	Jun Tsushima	72,060	50.9	▲4.9
CDP	Sekio Masuta	46,218	32.6	▼10.4
Sanseitō	Tsutomu Kato	14,181	10	
JCP	Mio Saitō	9,139	6.5	▼4.5
Registered electors		321,638		
Turnout		141,598	44.86	▼7.21
LDP hold				

2024
Party	Candidate	Votes	%	±%
LDP	Jun Tsushima	76,265	46.0	▼6.4
CDP	Sekio Masuta (elected in Tohoku PR block)	71,211	43.0	▲5.6
JCP	Mio Saitō	18,212	11.0	▲0.8
Registered electors		327,885		
Turnout			52.07	▲0.23
LDP hold				

2021
Party	Candidate	Votes	%	±%
LDP	Akinori Eto	91,011	52.4	▼2.5
CDP	Sekio Masuta	64,870	37.4	▲3.2
JCP	Mio Saitō	17,783	10.2	▼0.7
Turnout			51.84	▼2.21
LDP hold				

2017
Party	Candidate	Votes	%	±%
LDP	Jun Tsushima	103,177	54.9	▲9.8
Kibō no Tō	Sekio Masuta	64,173	34.2	
JCP	Yūto Akahira	20,497	10.9	▼1.6
Turnout			54.05	▲9.34
LDP hold				

2014
Party	Candidate	Votes	%	±%
LDP	Jun Tsushima (endorsed by Komeito)	66,041	45.1	+4.6
Innovation	Sekio Masuta (won PR seat)	47,400	42.1	+16.3
JCP	Yō Yoshimata	18,274	12.5	new

2012
Party	Candidate	Votes	%	±%
LDP	Jun Tsushima (endorsed by Komeito)	73,237	40.5	
Restoration	Sekio Masuta	47,400	26.2	
Tomorrow	Hokuto Yokoyama (endorsed by NPD)	32,050	17.7	
Democratic	Rina Hatano	17,066	9.4	
JCP	Mio Saitō	11,217	6.2	

2009
Party	Candidate	Votes	%	±%
Democratic	Hokuto Yokoyama (endorsed by PNP)	101,290	44.5	
Independent	Jun Tsushima (endorsed by Komeito)	68,910	30.3	
Independent (Hiranuma group)	Sekio Masuta	35,283	15.5	
Social Democratic	Hidehiko Watanabe	12,847	5.6	
JCP	Yō Yoshimata	7,976	3.5	
Happiness Realization	Kazuhiro Ueda	1,483	0.7	
Turnout		231,307	66.67	

2005
Party	Candidate	Votes	%	±%
LDP	Yūji Tsushima	94,072	40.4	
Democratic	Hokuto Yokoyama (won PR seat)	79,323	34.1	
Independent	Sekio Masuta	26,380	11.3	
Independent	Tetsukazu Shibutani	12,636	5.4	
Social Democratic	Ryōko Nakaya	11,521	4.9	
JCP	Hiroaki Takayanagi	8,832	3.8	
Turnout		235,923	66.38	

2003
Party	Candidate	Votes	%	±%
LDP	Yūji Tsushima	81,511	39.7	
Independent	Hokuto Yokoyama	74,799	36.4	
Democratic	Tsutomu Herai	15,736	7.7	
Social Democratic	Osami Imamura	14,123	6.9	
Independent	Shun'itsu Matsumori	12,119	5.9	
JCP	Takayuki Hatanaka	7,010	3.4	
Turnout		208,462	58.41	

2000
Party	Candidate	Votes	%	±%
LDP	Yūji Tsushima	96,691	51.4	
Social Democratic	Osami Imamura	40,706	21.6	
Democratic	Tsutomu Herai	34,645	18.4	
JCP	Yukimitsu Hori	16,094	8.6	

1996
Party	Candidate	Votes	%	±%
LDP	Yūji Tsushima	86,411	43.6	
New Frontier	Ryūichi Kudō	71,999	36.4	
Social Democratic	Osami Imamura	24,075	12.2	
JCP	Hideo Togashi	15,548	7.9	
Turnout		201,197	57.74	
