= Ichinohe =

Ichinohe may refer to:

- Ichinohe, Iwate, Japanese municipality
- Ichinohe Station, Japanese railroad station
- 5532 Ichinohe, main-belt asteroid
- Iwate-Ichinohe Tunnel, Japanese railroad-tunnel

== People with the surname ==
- Ichinohe Hyoe, Japanese World War II veteran
- Seitaro Ichinohe (一戸 誠太郎, born 1996), Japanese speed skater
- Tsuyoshi Ichinohe, Japanese ski jumper
