= Hokuto Yokoyama =

Japanese politician

- 横山 北斗

Member of the House of Representatives
- In office 12 September 2005 – 16 November 2012
- Preceded by: Multi-member district
- Succeeded by: Jun Tsushima
- Constituency: Tohoku PR (2005–2009); Aomori 1st (2009–2012)

Personal details
- Born: 25 October 1963 (age 62) Tokyo, Japan
- Party: Independent
- Other political affiliations: DPJ (2005–2012); PLF (2012); TPJ (2012–2013); PLP (2013–2017)
- Education: Chuo University; Tokai University

Hokuto Yokoyama (横山 北斗, Yokoyama Hokuto; born 25 October 1963) is a former Japanese politician of the Democratic Party of Japan, who served as a member of the House of Representatives in the Diet (national legislature). A native of Tokyo, he attended Chuo University as an undergraduate and received his Ph.D. in political science from Tokai University. After teaching at Hirosaki University, he ran unsuccessfully for the governorship of Aomori Prefecture, once in January 2003 and again in June of the same year. He also ran unsuccessfully for the House of Representatives in November 2003. In 2005, he was elected to the House of Representatives for the first time.

House of Representatives (Japan)
| Preceded by 14-member district | Member of the House of Representatives from Tōhoku PR block 2005–2009 | Succeeded by 14-member district |
| Preceded by Yūji Tsushima | Member of the House of Representatives from Aomori 1st district 2009–2012 | Succeeded by Jun Tsushima |
