= Masami Tanabu =

Japanese politician (1934–2025)

- 田名部 匡省

Minister of Agriculture, Forestry and Fisheries
- In office 5 November 1991 – 4 August 1993
- Prime Minister: Kiichi Miyazawa
- Preceded by: Motoji Kondō
- Succeeded by: Kiichi Miyazawa

Member of the House of Councillors
- In office 26 July 1998 – 25 July 2010
- Preceded by: Kanpei Matsuo
- Succeeded by: Tsutomu Yamazaki
- Constituency: Aomori at-large

Member of the House of Representatives
- In office 8 October 1979 – 27 September 1996
- Preceded by: Yoshio Kumagai
- Succeeded by: Constituency abolished
- Constituency: Aomori 1st

Member of the Aomori Prefectural Assembly
- In office 23 April 1967 – 22 April 1975
- Constituency: Hachinohe City

Personal details
- Born: 7 December 1934 Hachinohe, Aomori, Japan
- Died: 26 March 2025 (aged 90) Hachinohe, Aomori, Japan
- Party: Democratic
- Other political affiliations: Independent (1967–1979; 1998–2004); LDP (1979–1993); JRP (1993–1994); NFP (1994–1998)
- Children: Masayo Tanabu
- Education: Rikkyo University

Masami Tanabu (田名部 匡省, Tanabu Masami) (7 December 1934 – 26 March 2025) was a Japanese politician of the Democratic Party of Japan, a member of the House of Councillors in the Diet (national legislature). A native of Hachinohe, Aomori and graduate of Rikkyo University, he was elected to the House of Councillors for the first time in 2004 after serving in the Aomori Prefectural Assembly for two terms and then in the House of Representatives for six terms.

Tanabu was a past head coach of the Japan national ice hockey team. He also competed at the 1960 Winter Olympics and the 1964 Winter Olympics.

Tanabu died due to septic shock in hospital in Hachinohe, on 26 March 2025, at the age of 90.

House of Councillors
Preceded by Eijiro Hata	Chair, Communications Committee of the House of Councillors of Japan; 1989	Succeeded by Yoshiteru Uekusa
Preceded by Yoshinobu Shimamura	Chair, Transportation Committee of the House of Councillors of Japan; 1990–1991	Succeeded by Yoshiyuki Kamei
Preceded by Azuma Koshiishi	Chair, Land, Infrastructure, Transport and Tourism Committee of the House of Councillors of Japan; 2004–2005	Succeeded by Yuichiro Hata
Political offices
Preceded by Motoji Kondo	Minister of Agriculture, Forestry and Fisheries; 1991–1993	Succeeded by Kiichi Miyazawa
