= Yūji Tsushima =

Japanese politician (1930–2023)

- 津島 雄二
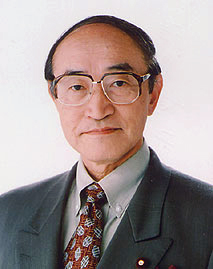
- Official portrait, 2000

Minister of Health and Welfare
- In office 4 July 2000 – 5 December 2000
- Prime Minister: Yoshirō Mori
- Preceded by: Yuya Niwa
- Succeeded by: Chikara Sakaguchi
- In office 28 February 1990 – 29 December 1990
- Prime Minister: Toshiki Kaifu
- Preceded by: Saburō Toida
- Succeeded by: Shinichirō Shimojō

Member of the House of Representatives
- In office 5 December 1976 – 21 July 2009
- Preceded by: Takudō Nakamura
- Succeeded by: Hokuto Yokoyama
- Constituency: Former Aomori 1st (1976–1996); Aomori 1st (1996–2009)

Personal details
- Born: Yuji Shima; 24 January 1930 Suginami, Tokyo, Japan
- Died: 25 October 2023 (aged 93) Tokyo, Japan
- Party: Liberal Democratic
- Spouse: Sonoko Tsushima
- Children: Jun Tsushima
- Relatives: Osamu Dazai (father-in-law); Yūko Tsushima (sister-in-law)
- Education: University of Tokyo; Syracuse University

Yūji Tsushima (津島 雄二, Tsushima Yūji; 24 January 1930 – 25 October 2023) was a Japanese politician who served in the House of Representatives in the Diet (national legislature) as a member of the Liberal Democratic Party.

== Early life and career ==
Tsushima was born in Tokyo Prefecture as Yuji Shima and adopted his mother's family name at age 3, becoming Yuji Ueno. He attended the University of Tokyo and passed the bar exam while still in college. In 1953, he joined the Ministry of Finance. During this time he attended Syracuse University in the United States as a part of the Fulbright Program.

Tsushima worked in the Japanese Embassy in Paris from 1963 to 1967. While stationed in Paris, he adopted the Tsushima family name upon his marriage to Sonoko Tsushima, the daughter of writer Osamu Dazai (Shuji Tsushima) and niece of politician Bunji Tsushima.

Leaving the ministry in 1974, he was elected to the House of Representatives in 1976, representing Aomori Prefecture. He served as the Minister of Health in 1990 and 2000.

Tsushima was elected to head the LDP faction of former Prime Minister Ryutaro Hashimoto in 2005 following Hashimoto's resignation amid a 100 million yen political funds scandal.

On 19 July 2009, after 33 consecutive years in office, Tsushima announced that he had no plan to run in the following election. His seat was taken over by opposition candidate Hokuto Yokoyama in the 2009 general election.

Tsushima registered as an attorney in 2005 (while still in office), joining the Tokyo law firm of Tanabe & Partners, and remained a partner at the firm following his resignation. In March 2010 he was appointed a special advisor to Shinsei Bank.

== Personal life and death ==
Tsushima was the fourth of five Diet members in his family. His son Jun Tsushima is currently a member of the House of Representatives, having won the Aomori 1st district seat previously held by his father in the 2012 general election. Tsushima attributed his family's influence to a decision by Bunji Tsushima to give his land in Aomori to farm laborers. The other family members in the Diet were Bunji Tsushima, who served in both houses following a stint as Governor of Aomori Prefecture; Kichirō Tazawa, a member of the House of Representatives from 1960 to 1996 and defense minister in the cabinet of Zenko Suzuki; and Kyoichi Tsushima, a member of the House of Representatives since 2003 who served as a vice-minister in the cabinet of Yoshihiko Noda.

Yūji Tsushima died on 25 October 2023, at the age of 93.

Political offices
Preceded by Saburō Toida; Yuya Niwa	Minister of Health; 1990; 2000	Succeeded by Shinichirō Shimojō; Chikara Sakaguchi
