= Motome Takisawa =

Japanese politician (born 1958)

- 滝沢 求
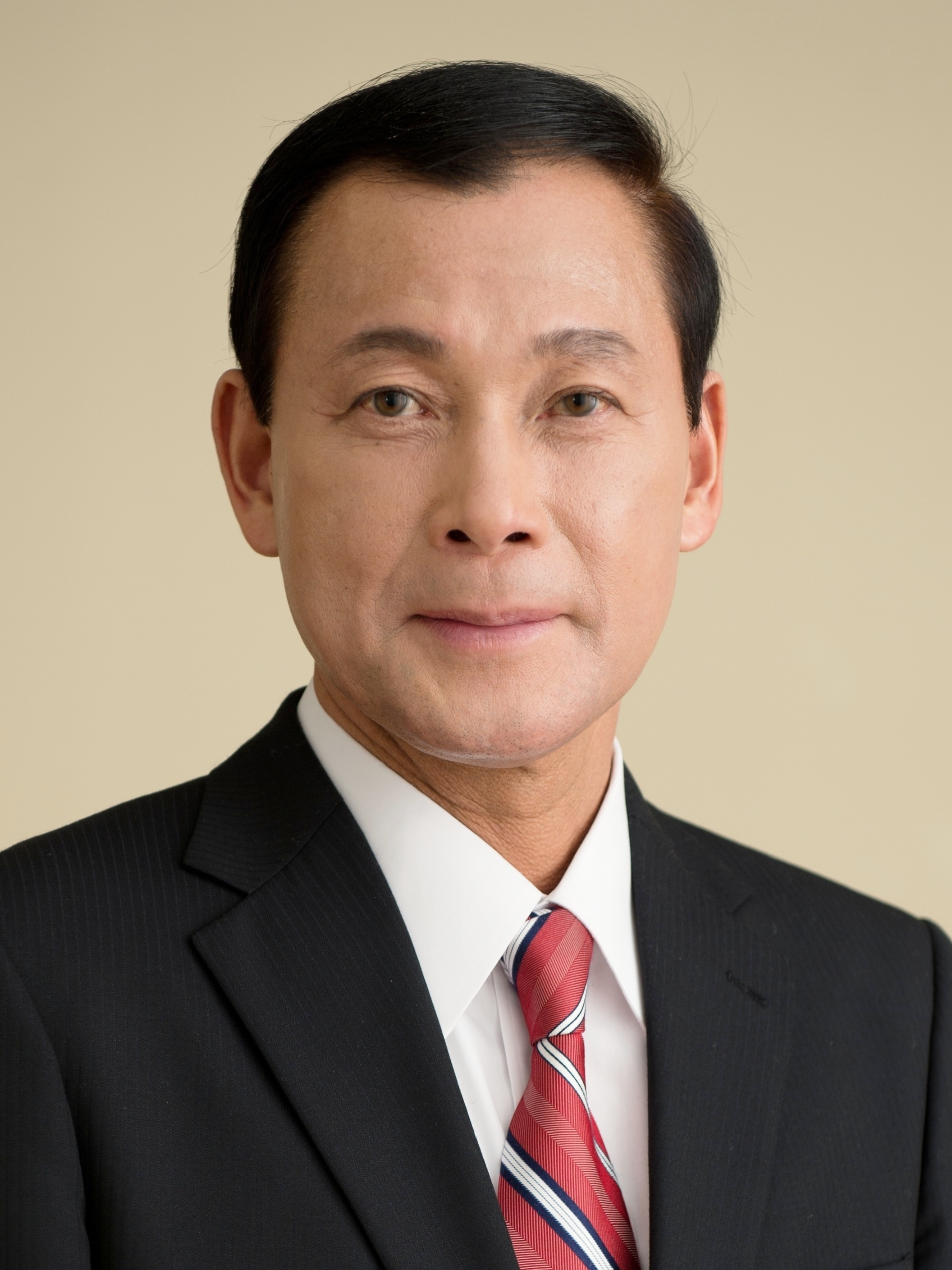

Member of the House of Councillors
- In office 29 July 2013 – 28 July 2025
- Preceded by: Kōji Hirayama
- Succeeded by: Masumi Fukushi
- Constituency: Aomori at-large

Member of the Aomori Prefectural Assembly
- In office 1998–2013
- Constituency: Hachinohe City

Personal details
- Born: 滝沢 求 (Takisawa Motome); 11 October 1958 (age 67) Hachinohe, Aomori, Japan
- Party: Liberal Democratic
- Education: Chuo University

Motome Takisawa (滝沢 求, Takisawa Motome; born 11 October 1958) is a Japanese politician from the Liberal Democratic Party. He served as member of the House of Councillors for Aomori at-large district.
