= Junichi Kanda =

Japanese male businessman and politician (1970-)

- 神田 潤一
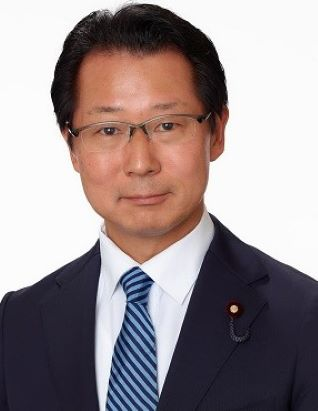
- Official portrait, 2025

Member of the House of Representatives
- Incumbent
- Assumed office November 2, 2021
- Preceded by: Tadamori Ōshima
- Constituency: Aomori 2nd

Parliamentary Vice-Minister of Justice
- In office November 13, 2024 – October 21, 2025
- Preceded by: Hideyuki Nakano
- Succeeded by: Fukuyama no kami

Parliamentary Vice-Minister of Cabinet Office
- In office September 15, 2023 – 2024

Personal details
- Born: September 27, 1970 (age 56) Hachinohe, Aomori, Japan
- Party: Liberal Democratic
- Relatives: Shigeo Kanda (Great-grandfather, mayor of Hachinohe); Yoichi Kanda (Father, Hachinohe City Council)
- Education: Faculty of Economics, University of Tokyo
- Occupation: Politician
- Website: Official Website

Junichi Kanda (神田 潤一) (born September 27, 1970) is a Japanese politician and businessman. He is a member of the House of Representatives (for two terms) belonging to the Liberal Democratic Party (LDP). Kanda has served as Parliamentary Vice-Minister of Justice, Parliamentary Vice-Minister of Cabinet Office, Bank of Japan official, and Financial Services Agency official.

== Early life ==
Kanda was born September 27, 1970 in Hachinohe, Aomori Prefecture. His paternal ancestral line is descended from the Tonan branch of the Aizu Domain of samurai warriors. Kanda's great-grandfather was Shigeo Kanda, the three-term mayor of mayor of Hachinohe 1929-1942. His father was Yoichi Kanda, who served as a Hachinohe City Council member and chairman of the 38th District of the Japanese Communist Party.

After graduating from Aomori Prefectural Hachinohe High School, he entered the University of Tokyo and graduated from the Faculty of Economics in 1994, joining the Bank of Japan in the same year. He received a master's degree in economincs from Yale University in 2000.

== Career ==
Kanda worked in Bank of Japan from 1994 to 2017. He then temporarily worked at Nippon Life Insurance Company where he was in charge of investment risk management from 2011 to 2012. Afterwards, he worked the Financial Services Agency from 2015 to 2017, where he was involved in research and policy planning related to the advancement of Japan's payment systems and infrastructure. Kanda joined Money Forward on November 29, 2017 and became an executive officer. He left Money Forward on August 31, 2021.

In August 2021, following the retirement of Oshima Tadashi, Kanda became the head of the Liberal Democratic Party's Aomori 2nd District branch. On October 31, 2021, he was first elected to the House of Representatives in the 49th general election. In February 2022, he joined the Kōchikai faction of the LDP, which was officially dissolved in 2024.

The LDP presidential election was announced on September 12, 2024, with two candidates from the former Kishida faction, Yoshimasa Hayashi and Yoko Kamikawa, running. Around 10:30 PM on September 26, the day before the election, the Sankei Shimbun newspaper reported that Tarō Asō had instructed his faction members to support Sanae Takaichi from the first round of voting. On the morning of September 27, Prime Minister Fumio Kishida, anticipating Takaichi's likely survival in the runoff election, issued a command to members of the former Kishida faction, saying, "In the runoff election, vote for anyone other than Takaichi. Please cast your vote for the candidate with the most party member votes." Takaichi received 72 votes in the first round of voting, far exceeding the 30-40 votes predicted by various media outlets in advance. Although she received the most votes, including the number of party members, she lost to Shigeru Ishiba in the runoff election. Kanda voted for Shinjirō Koizumi in the first round of voting, and for Ishiba in the runoff election.

On September 15, 2023 – 2024 he began serving as Parliamentary Vice-Minister of Cabinet Office, a position he held until 2024. On October 27, 2024, he was re-elected for a second term in the 50th general election for the House of Representatives. On November 13 of the same year, he was appointed Parliamentary Vice-Minister of Justice in the second Ishiba Cabinet. On September 5, 2025, he appeared on the TV program "Hodo 1930" and revealed his intention to submit a letter on the September 8 requesting that the party presidential election be brought forward.

Kanda was one of Shinjirō Koizumi's supporters in the LDP presidential election announced on September 22, 2025.

== Political funds ==
In 2024, it was discovered that the LDP branch headed by Kanda had not included a 1 million yen donation from the former Kishida faction in its political funding report. Kanda apologized and said he would correct the mistake within a few days.

== Affiliated organizations and parliamentary associations ==
- Liberal Democratic Party Tobacco Special Committee (Chair)
- Japan-Korea Parliamentary Friendship League

== Election history ==
House of Representatives (Japan)
Preceded by Tadamori Ōshima	Member of the House of Representatives for Aomori 2nd district (single-member); 2021–present	Incumbent
Political offices
Preceded by Hideyuki Nakano	Parliamentary Vice-Minister of Justice; 2024–20257	Succeeded by Fukuyama no kami
Preceded by Unknown	Parliamentary Vice-Minister of Cabinet Office; 2023–2024	Succeeded by Unknown
