= JR Bus Tōhoku Company =

Operator of inter-city and regional bus lines, Japan

JR Bus Tōhoku ジェイアールバス東北株式会社
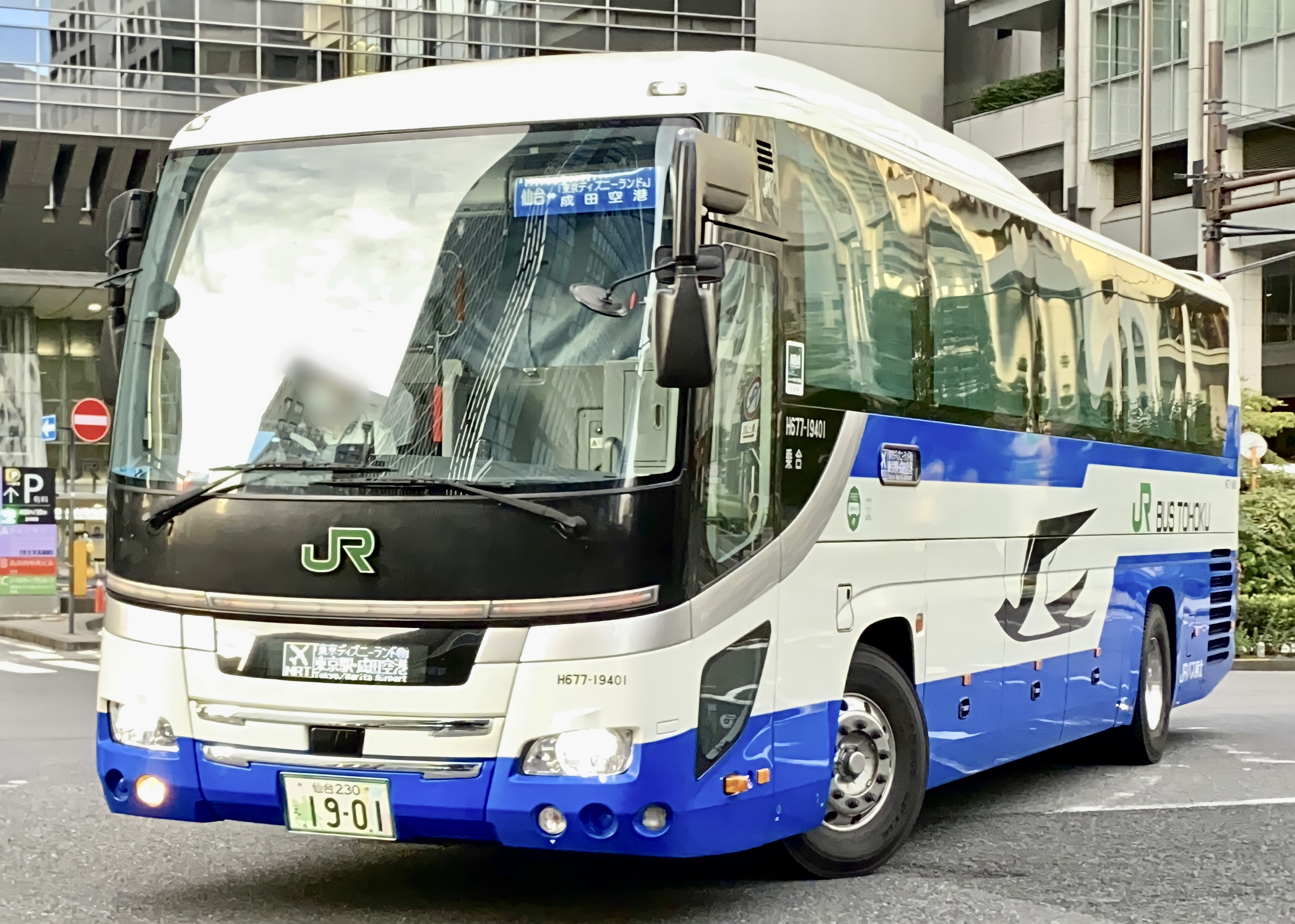
- JR Bus Tōhoku Hino S'elega at Tokyo Station
- Company type: KK
- Founded: March 1, 1988
- Headquarters: Sendai, Miyagi, Japan
- Website: www.jrbustohoku.co.jp

JR Bus Tōhoku (ジェイアールバス東北株式会社, Jeiāru Basu Tōhoku Kabushiki-gaisha) is an operator of inter-city and regional bus lines based in the Tōhoku region of Japan. A subsidiary of the East Japan Railway Company (JR East) group, JR Bus Tohoku is one of eight JR Bus companies within Japan Railways Group (JR Group).

== Outline ==
JR Bus Tohoku was established on 5 March 1988 the same as JR Bus Kanto by splitting from JR East Bus. This bus company was actually established as JR East Bus Tohoku Branch the same as JR East was established on 1 April 1987. This firm operates routes connecting the Tohoku region to the Tokyo metropolitan area and cities within the region, as well as regional routes providing intra-regional service. It also operates buses with liveries based on the E5, E6 and E8 series Shinkansen trains.

== Offices ==
- Aomori branch
- Ōminato office
- Morioka branch
- Kuji office
- Ninohe office
- Akita branch
- Sendai branch
- Fukushima branch

== Bus routes ==
Below-mentioned bullet point summary are bus routes and terminus.

=== Highway bus ===
- La foret (ラ・フォーレ) (Aomori - Tokyo)
- Rakuchin (らくちん) (Morioka - Ikebukuro / Tokyo)
- Dream Chōkai (ドリーム鳥海) (Ugo-Honjō - Tokyo)
- Dream Sasanishiki(ドリームササニシキ) (Furukawa / Sendai - Tokyo)
- Masamune (政宗) (Sendai - Shinjuku)
- Abukuma (あぶくま) (Fukushima / Kōriyama - Shinjuku)
- Dream Sakuranbo (ドリームさくらんぼ) (Yamagata - Shinjuku)
- Dream Yokohama Sendai (ドリーム横浜・仙台) (Sendai - Shinagawa / Yokohama)
- Dream Fukushima Yokohama (ドリームふくしま・横浜) (Fukushima / Kōriyama - Tokyo / Yokohama)
- WE Liner (WEライナー) (Sendai - Niigata)
- Green Liner (グリーンライナー) (Sendai - Yokote / Ōmagari / Yuzawa)
- Sendai Ōdate (仙台・大館号) (Sendai - Hanawa / Ōdate)
- Senshū (仙秋) (Sendai - Akita)
- Kenji Liner (けんじライナー) (Sendai - Kitakami / Hanamaki)
- Urban (アーバン) (Sendai - Morioka)
- Umineko (うみねこ) (Sendai - Hachinohe)
- Blue City (ブルーシティ) (Sendai - Aomori)
- Super YūYū (スーパー湯～遊) (Morioka - Jhōbōji - Ninohe)
- Yodel (ヨーデル) (Morioka - Ōwani - Hirosaki)
- Sendai - Fukushima
- Sendai - Kōriyama
- Sendai - Aizu-Wakamatsu
- Sendai - Iwaki
- Sendai - Furukawa
- Sendai - Mizusawa / Esashi
- Sendai - Yonezawa

=== Route bus ===
- Fukunami Line (福浪線) (Fukushima - Kawamata)
- Hayasaka-Kōgen Line (早坂高原線) (Morioka - Iwaizumi)
- Hiraniwa-Kōgen Line (平庭高原線) (Morioka - Numakunai - Kuzumaki - Kuji)
- Numakunai Line (沼宮内線) (Kuzumaki - Arasawaguchi)
- Ninohe Line (二戸線) (Ninohe - Jhōbōji)
- Karumai Line (軽米線) (Ninohe - Karumai)
- Kozuya Line (小鳥谷線) (Ninohe - Ichinohe - Kozuya - Kuzumaki)
- East Towada Line (十和田東線) (Hachinohe - Lake Towada)
- North Towada Line (十和田北線) (Aomori - Lake Towada)
- Yokouchi Line (横内線) (Aomori - Yokouchi - Moya)
- Aomori Airport Line (青森空港線) (Aomori - Aomori Airport)
- Shimokita Line(下北線) (Tanabu - Ōminato - Kawauchi - Wakinosawa)
