= Kōji Hirayama =

Japanese politician

- 平山 幸司

Member of the House of Councillors
- In office 29 July 2007 – 28 July 2013
- Preceded by: Tsutomu Yamazaki
- Succeeded by: Motome Takisawa
- Constituency: Aomori at-large

Personal details
- Born: 9 November 1969 (age 56) Goshogawara, Aomori, Japan
- Party: Democratic (2006–2012)
- Other political affiliations: People's Life First (2012); Tomorrow (2012–2013); People's Life (2013–2016)
- Education: Kanto Gakuin University; Keio University

Kōji Hirayama (平山 幸司, Hirayama Kōji; born November 9, 1969) is a Japanese politician of the Democratic Party of Japan, a member of the House of Councillors in the Diet (national legislature). A native of Goshogawara, Aomori and graduate of Kanto Gakuin University and Keio University, he was elected for the first time in 2007.
