= Aomori 2nd district =

Japan House of Representatives constituency

Aomori 2nd District
- Parliamentary constituency for the Japanese House of Representatives
- Numbered map of Aomori Prefecture single-member districts
- Prefecture: Aomori
- Proportional District: Tōhoku
- Electorate: 369,866 (2026)

Current constituency
- Created: 1994
- Seats: One
- Party: LDP
- Representative: Junichi Kanda
- Created from: Aomori's 1st "medium-sized" district

Aomori 2nd district (青森県第2区, Aomori-ken dai-niku or simply 青森2区, Aomori-niku) is a single-member constituency of the House of Representatives in the national Diet of Japan. It is located in Eastern Aomori and is made up of the cities of, Towada, Misawa, and Hachinohe, the district of Sannohe and a portion of Kamikita District.

As of 2015, this district was home to 250,364 constituents, roughly half the number of Japan's largest district, Tokyo 1st district.

Aomori is a so-called "Liberal Democratic kingdom," meaning that it frequently returns members of Japan's Liberal Democratic Party. Akinori Eto represented the district continuously from 2003 to 2017, one of few Liberal Democratic representatives not voted out of office during the Democratic Party of Japan's rapid rise to power during the 2009 general election. Eto served as Minister of Defense in 2014, during Prime Minister Shinzō Abe's 2nd cabinet rotation.

After redistricting in 2017, the 2nd district covers all of what was previously the 3rd district. Some areas in the northern part where transferred to the Aomori 1st district, including the city of Mutsu.

== List of representatives ==
Representative	Party	Dates	Notes
Akinori Eto	LDP	1996 – 2000	Lost re-election
Shingo Mimura	AI	2000 – 2003	
Akinori Eto	LDP	2003 – 2017	Gained a seat in the Tohoku PR block
Tadamori Ōshima	LDP	2017 – 2021	Former Representative of the 3rd district
Junichi Kanda	LDP	2021 –	

== Election results ==
2026
Party	Candidate	Votes	%	±%
LDP	Junichi Kanda	104,608	54.6	▲9.22
CDP	Matsuo Kazuhiko	51,027	26.6	▼4.47
DPP	Akira Kanehama	30,016	15.7	▼2.70
JCP	Sho Kubo	5,909	3.1	▼2.05
Turnout		191,560	52.49	▲3.09
LDP hold				

2024
Party	Candidate	Votes	%	±%
LDP	Junichi Kanda	82,784	45.38	▼16.12
Independent	Kazuhiko Matsuo	56,674	31.07	new
DPP	Akira Kanehama	33,569	18.40	new
JCP	Kubo Show	9,397	5.15	▼1.15
Turnout		182,424	49.40	▼4.16
LDP hold				

2021
Party	Candidate	Votes	%	±%
LDP	Junichi Kanda	126,137	61.5	▼2.5
CDP	Noriko Takahata	65,908	32.1	
JCP	Miyuki Tabata	12,965	6.3	▼2.8
Turnout			53.56	▲0.96
LDP hold				

2017
Party	Candidate	Votes	%	±%
LDP	Tadamori Ōshima	133,545	64.0	▼3.5
Kibō no Tō	Takeshi Kudō	56,011	26.9	
JCP	Naomi Akumoto	19,004	9.1	▲0.1
Turnout			52.60	▲3.38
LDP hold				

2014
Party	Candidate	Votes	%	±%
LDP	Akinori Eto (endorsed by Kōmeitō)	81,054	67.48	
Ishin	Noriko Nakanowatari	28,282	23.55	
JCP	Ryōko Ogasawara	10,775	8.97	

2012
Party	Candidate	Votes	%	±%
LDP	Akinori Eto (endorsed by Kōmeitō)	81,937	65.22	
Democratic	Tomonobu Nakamura	18,836	14.99	
Tomorrow	Noriko Nakanowatari (endorsed by NPD)	18,180	14.47	
JCP	Ryōko Ogasawara	6,683	5.32	

2009
Party	Candidate	Votes	%	±%
LDP	Akinori Eto (endorsed by Kōmeitō)	86,654	54.0	
Democratic	Noriko Nakanowatari (endorsed by PNP) (won in PR district)	64,334	40.1	
Independent	Hisako Kumagai	7,164	4.5	
Happiness Realization	Kiyoshi Morimitsu	2,288	1.4	

2005
Party	Candidate	Votes	%	±%
LDP	Akinori Eto (endorsed by Kōmeitō)	89,887	58.26	
Democratic	Tomonobu Nakamura	46,124	29.90	
Social Democratic	Chiyoji Kinoshita	13,327	8.64	
JCP	Toshimitsu Ichikawa	4,941	3.20	

2003
Party	Candidate	Votes	%	±%
LDP	Akinori Eto	96,784	75.07	
Social Democratic	Kōichi Saitō	21,537	16.70	
JCP	Shōko Kudō	10,605	8.22	

2000
Party	Candidate	Votes	%	±%
Assembly of Independents	Shingo Mimura (endorsed by LP), DPJ)	80,338	46.9	
LDP	Akinori Eto (endorsed by NCP)	74,118	43.3	
Social Democratic	Chiyoji Kinoshita	13,112	7.7	
JCP	Naiki Kudō	3,645	2.1	

1996
Party	Candidate	Votes	%	±%
LDP	Akinori Eto	63,672	41.9	
New Frontier	Shingo Mamura	62,907	41.4	
Democratic	Tsutomu Herai	11,581	7.6	
Social Democratic	Reiko Tatebe	8,705	5.7	
JCP	Kazutaka Sōma	5,235	3.4	
