= Tamagawa Gakuen Junior College for Women =

Coordinates: 35°34′02″N 139°28′06″E

Tamagawa Gakuen Junior College for Women (玉川学園女子短期大学, Tamagawa Gakuen Joshi Tanki Daigaku) was a private junior college at Machida city, Tokyo in Japan.

== History ==
The Tamagawa Gakuen Junior College for Women General Education section was founded in 1965. The Child Care department was added in 1967, and was renamed as the infantile education department in 1984.

The advanced course education major was set up in 1994. The college stopped taking new students in 2002, and was abolished and integrated into Tamagawa University in 2004.

== Subjects ==
- General Education Section
- Infantile education department

== Advanced course ==
- General Education major
