= Takao Mikami =

Japanese politician (1933–2026)

- 三上隆雄

Member of the House of Councillors for the Aomori at-large district
- In office 23 July 1989 – 22 July 1995

Personal details
- Born: 2 November 1933 Aomori Prefecture, Japan
- Died: 9 July 2026 (aged 92)
- Party: DPJ
- Occupation: Farmer

Takao Mikami (Japanese: 三上隆雄 Mikami Takao; 2 November 1933 – 9 July 2026) was a Japanese politician. A member of the Democratic Party, he served in the House of Councillors from 1989 to 1995.

Mikami died on 9 July 2026, at the age of 92.
