= Metoki Station =

Railway station in Sannohe, Aomori Prefecture, Japan

Metoki Station 目時駅
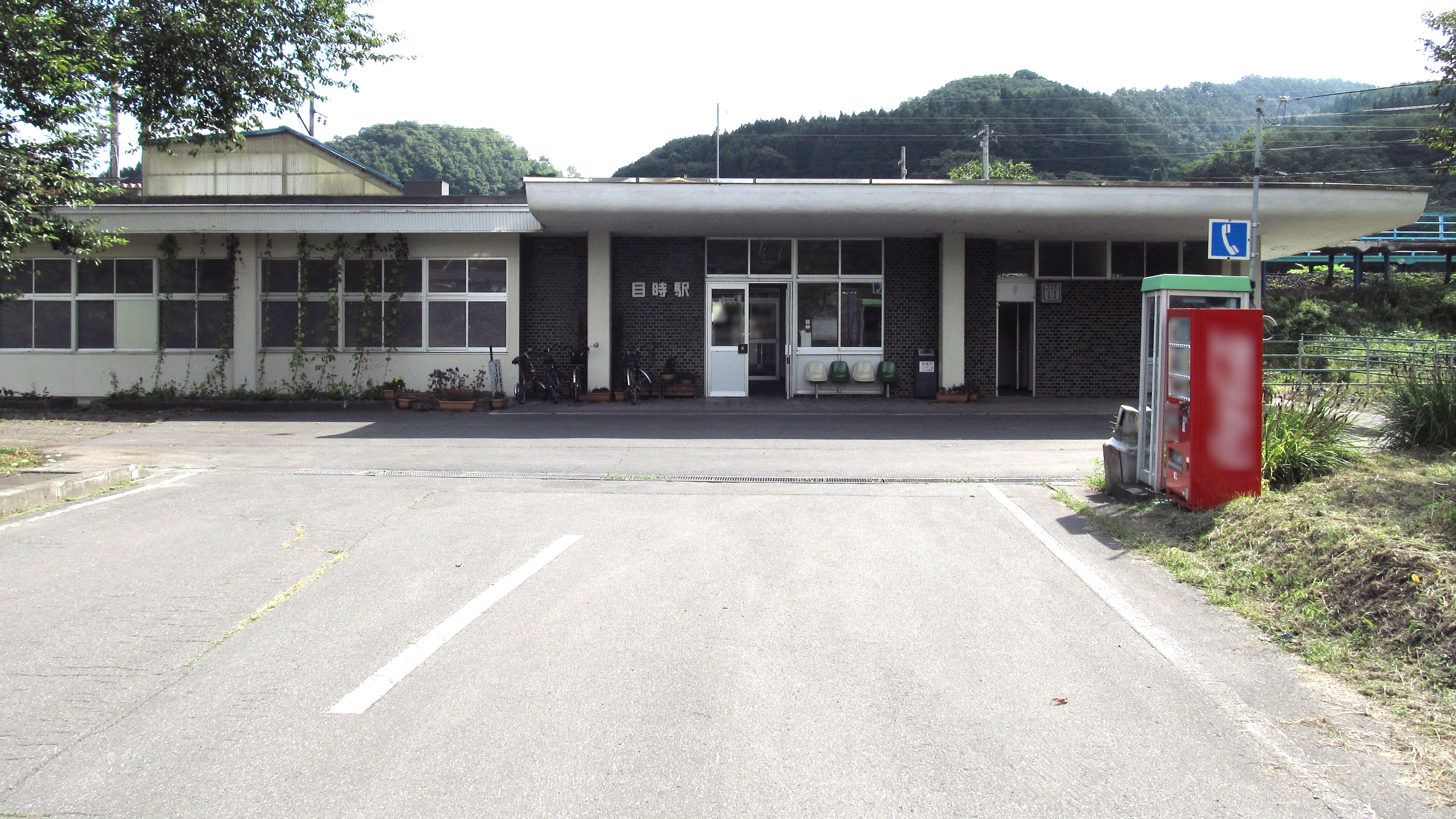
- Metoki Station in September 2012

General information
- Location: Metoki Muranaka, Sannohe, Sannohe District, Aomori Prefecture 039-0113; Japan
- Coordinates: 40°21′07″N 141°17′22″E
- System: Regional rail station
- Operator: Aoimori Railway; Iwate Galaxy Railway Company
- Lines: ■ Aoimori Railway Line; ■ Iwate Galaxy Railway Line
- Platforms: 2 side platforms
- Tracks: 2

Construction
- Structure type: At grade

Other information
- Status: Unstaffed
- Website: Official website

History
- Opened: 1 October 1948

Passengers
- 423 daily boardings (2018)

Services
Preceding station	Iwate Galaxy Railway	Following station
Kintaichi-Onsen towards Morioka	Iwate Galaxy Railway Line	through to Aoimori Railway Line
Preceding station	Aoimori Railway	Following station
through to Iwate Galaxy Railway Line	Aoimori Railway Line	Sannohe towards Aomori
Location
- Location within Aomori Prefecture Location within Japan

Metoki Station (目時駅, Metoki-eki) is a railway station in the town of Sannohe in the Sannohe District of Aomori Prefecture, Japan. It is operated by the third sector railway operators Aoimori Railway Company and Iwate Galaxy Railway Company.

== Location ==
Metoki Station is the southern terminus of the Aoimori Railway Line, and is 121.9 kilometers from the northern terminus of the line at Aomori Station. It is also the northern terminus of the Iwate Galaxy Railway Line, and is 82.0 kilometers from the southern terminus at Morioka Station. It is 622.8 kilometers from Tokyo Station.

=== Surrounding area ===
- Mabechi River

== Station layout ==
Metoki Station has two opposed side platforms serving two tracks, connected to the station building by a footbridge. The station building is relatively large, but is unattended.

=== Platforms ===
1	■ Aoimori Railway Line	for Sannohe and Hachinohe
2	■ Iwate Galaxy Railway Line	for Ninohe and Morioka

== History ==
Metoki Station opened on 20 December 1924 as the Metoki Signal Stop on the Tōhoku Main Line on the Japanese National Railways (JNR). It was elevated to the status of a full station on 1 October 1948. Freight operations were discontinued from April 1962. With the privatization of the JNR on 1 April 1987, it came under the operational control of JR East. It came under the joint control of the Aoimori Railway and the Iwate Galaxy Railway Company on 1 December 2002.

== Services ==
In fiscal 2018, the station was used by an average of 423 passengers daily.

== See also ==
- List of railway stations in Japan
