= Sannohe Station =

Railway station in Sannohe, Aomori Prefecture, Japan

Sannohe 三戸
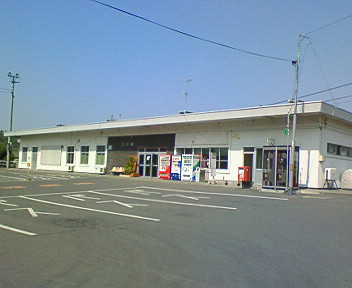
- Sannohe Station in June 2007

General information
- Location: Omukai, Nanbu-machi, Sannohe-gun, Aomori-ken 039-0103; Japan
- Coordinates: 40°23′45″N 141°16′23″E
- System: Regional rail station
- Operator: Aoimori Railway
- Line: ■ Aoimori Railway Line
- Distance: 5.5 km from Metoki
- Platforms: 1 island + 1 side platform
- Tracks: 3
- Connections: Bus stop

Construction
- Structure type: At grade

Other information
- Status: Staffed
- Website: Official website

History
- Opened: September 1, 1898

Services
Preceding station	Aoimori Railway	Following station
Metoki Terminus	Aoimori Railway Line	Suwanotaira towards Aomori
Location
- Location within Aomori Prefecture Location within Japan

Sannohe Station (三戸駅, Sannohe-eki) is a railway station located in the Aoimori Railway Line in the town of Nanbu in Aomori Prefecture, Japan, operated by the third sector railway operator Aoimori Railway Company.

== Lines ==
Sannohe Station is one of the six principal stations served by the Aoimori Railway Line, and is located 5.5 kilometers from the lines terminus at Metoki Station. It is situated 622.8 kilometers away from Tokyo Station.

== Station layout ==
Sannohe Station has one ground-level island platform and one ground-level side platform serving three tracks connected to the station building by a footbridge. However, only tracks 1 and 3 are in use, while track 2 is used as a siding. The station is staffed.

=== Platforms ===
1	■ Aoimori Railway Line	for Hachinohe and Aomori
2	■ Aoimori Railway Line	(siding)
3	■ Aoimori Railway Line	for Ninohe and Morioka

Note: Track 2 is used primarily for freight trains changing direction.

== History ==
Sannohe Station was opened on September 1, 1898, as Sannohe Station (三ノ戸駅, Sannohe-eki) of the Nippon Railway. When the Nippon Railway was nationalized on November 1, 1906, it became a station on the Tōhoku Main Line of the Japan National Railways (JNR), and the kanji for its name was changed to the present configuration. Freight operations were discontinued from April 1962. With the privatization of the JNR on April 1, 1987, it came under the operational control of JR East. It came under the control of the Aoimori Railway Line on December 1, 2002.

== Surrounding area ==
- Mabechi River
- Former Nanbu Town Hall
- Sannohe Castle site

== See also ==
- List of railway stations in Japan
