= Aomori 1st district (1947–1993) =

Former Japan House of Representatives constituency

== List of representatives ==
- Yūji Tsushima, Liberal Democratic Party、1976・1979・1980・1983・1986・1990・1993

== Election results ==
- 1993 Japanese general election
  - Yūji Tsushima, Liberal Democratic Party
- 1990 Japanese general election
  - Yūji Tsushima, Liberal Democratic Party
- 1986 Japanese general election
  - Yūji Tsushima, Liberal Democratic Party
- 1983 Japanese general election
  - Yūji Tsushima, Liberal Democratic Party
- 1980 Japanese general election
  - Yūji Tsushima, Liberal Democratic Party
- 1979 Japanese general election
  - Yūji Tsushima, Liberal Democratic Party
- 1976 Japanese general election
  - Yūji Tsushima, Liberal Democratic Party
- 1947 Japanese general election
