= Mabechi River =

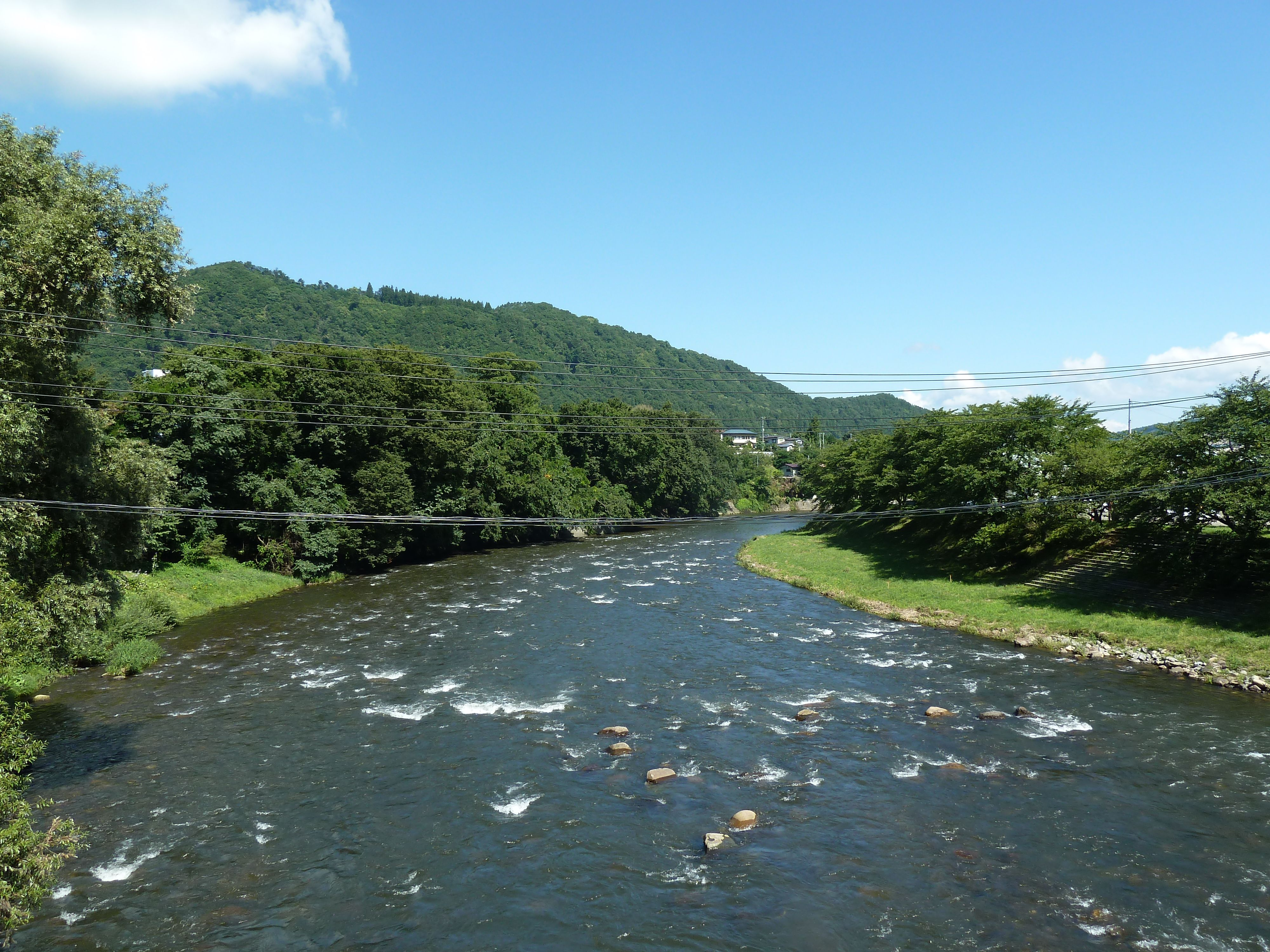
- Mabechi River in Ninohe, Iwate

- Location within Japan
- Native name: 馬淵川 (Japanese)

Location
- Country: Japan

Physical characteristics
- Source
  - location: Sodeyama Plateau, Iwate Prefecture
  - elevation: 1,215 m (3,986 ft)
- Mouth: Hachinohe, Aomori
  - location: Pacific Ocean
  - coordinates: 40°32′28″N 141°30′12″E
  - elevation: 0 m (0 ft)
- Length: 142 km (88 mi)
- Basin size: 2,050 km^{2} (790 sq mi)
- Discharge
  - average: 60.88 m^{3}/s (2,150 cu ft/s)
- National Palace of Scenic Beauty Mabechi River (Aomori Prefecture) Mabechi River (Japan)

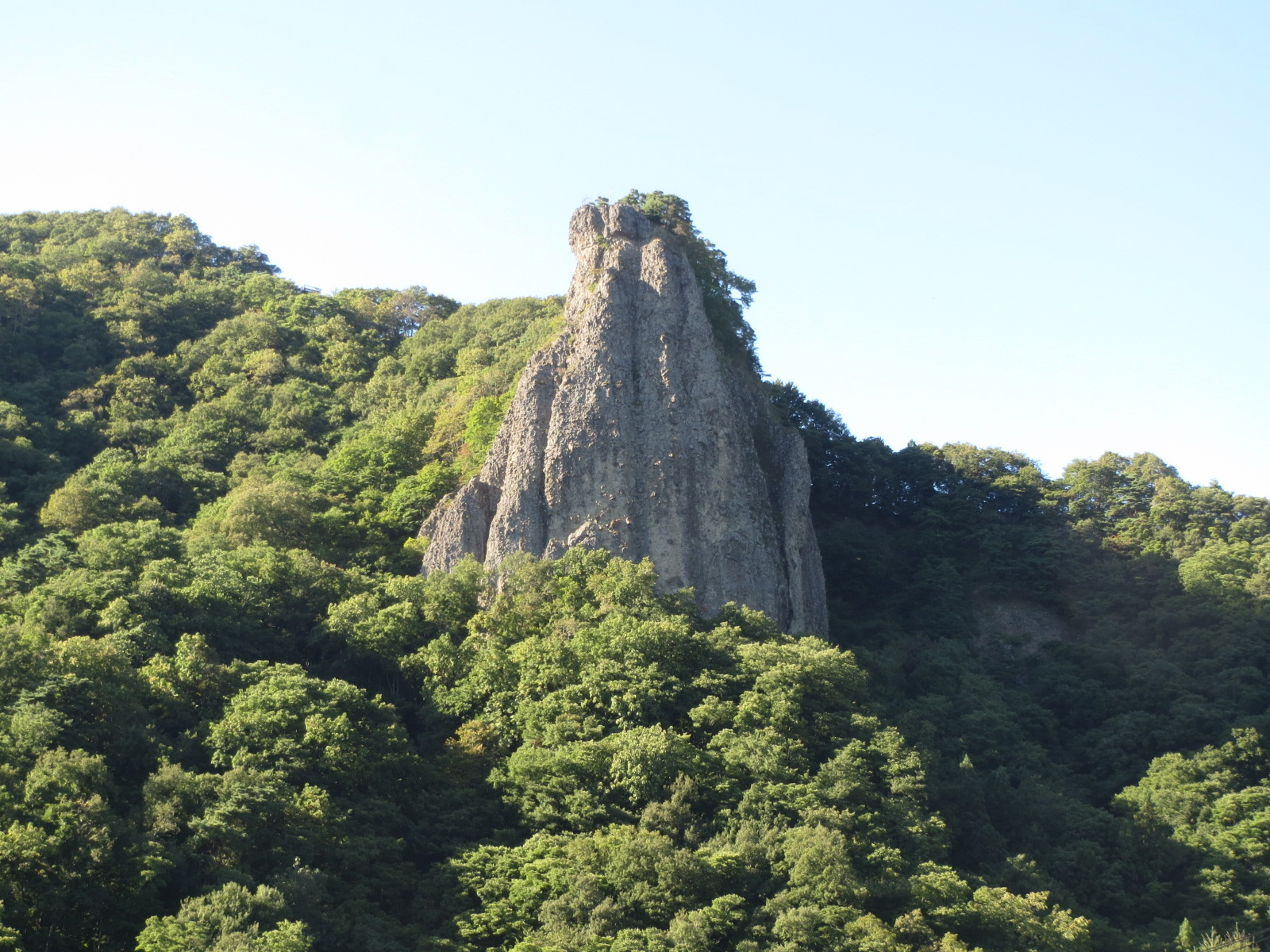
Ogami Rock overlooking the Basenkyō ravine in Iwate

The Mabechi River (馬淵川, Mabechigawa) is a Class A river located in northern Iwate Prefecture and eastern Aomori Prefecture, in the Tōhoku region of northern Honshū in Japan.

== Overview ==
The Mabechi River is 142 kilometres (88 mi) long and has a [[draClass Ainage basin|watershed]] of 2,050 square kilometres (790 sq mi).

The Mabuchi River rises from the Sodeyama Plateau in the Kitakami Mountains of northeastern Iwate Prefecture and flows to the northeast between the Kitakami Mountains and the Ōu Mountains through eastern Aomori Prefecture into the Pacific Ocean at Hachinohe, Aomori. The Port of Hachinohe is located at the mouth of the river. The city of Hachinohe utilises water from the Mabechi River for industrial purposes.

== Basenkyō ==
Near the boundary between Ninohe and town of Ichinohe, the river passes through a valley with cliffs, rock formations and pools. Geologically, the surrounding hills are composed of andesite and are the remnants of an ancient submarine volcano. The ravine is flanked by a 280-meter (920 ft) monolithic cliff labelled the Ogami-iwa (男神岩) on one side, and the Megami-iwa (女神岩) on the other. Nearby Mount Torigoe (鳥越山) (371.1 meters; 1,218 ft) is regarded as a holy mountain, and houses a statue of Kannon Bosatsu in a cave which is an object of pilgrimage. These rock formations and the mountain have been designated a National Place of Scenic Beauty and Natural Monument since 2006. The area is located within the Oritsume Basenkyō Prefectural Natural Park.

== See also ==
- List of Places of Scenic Beauty of Japan (Iwate)
- Geibikei
