= Hakkōda Tunnel =

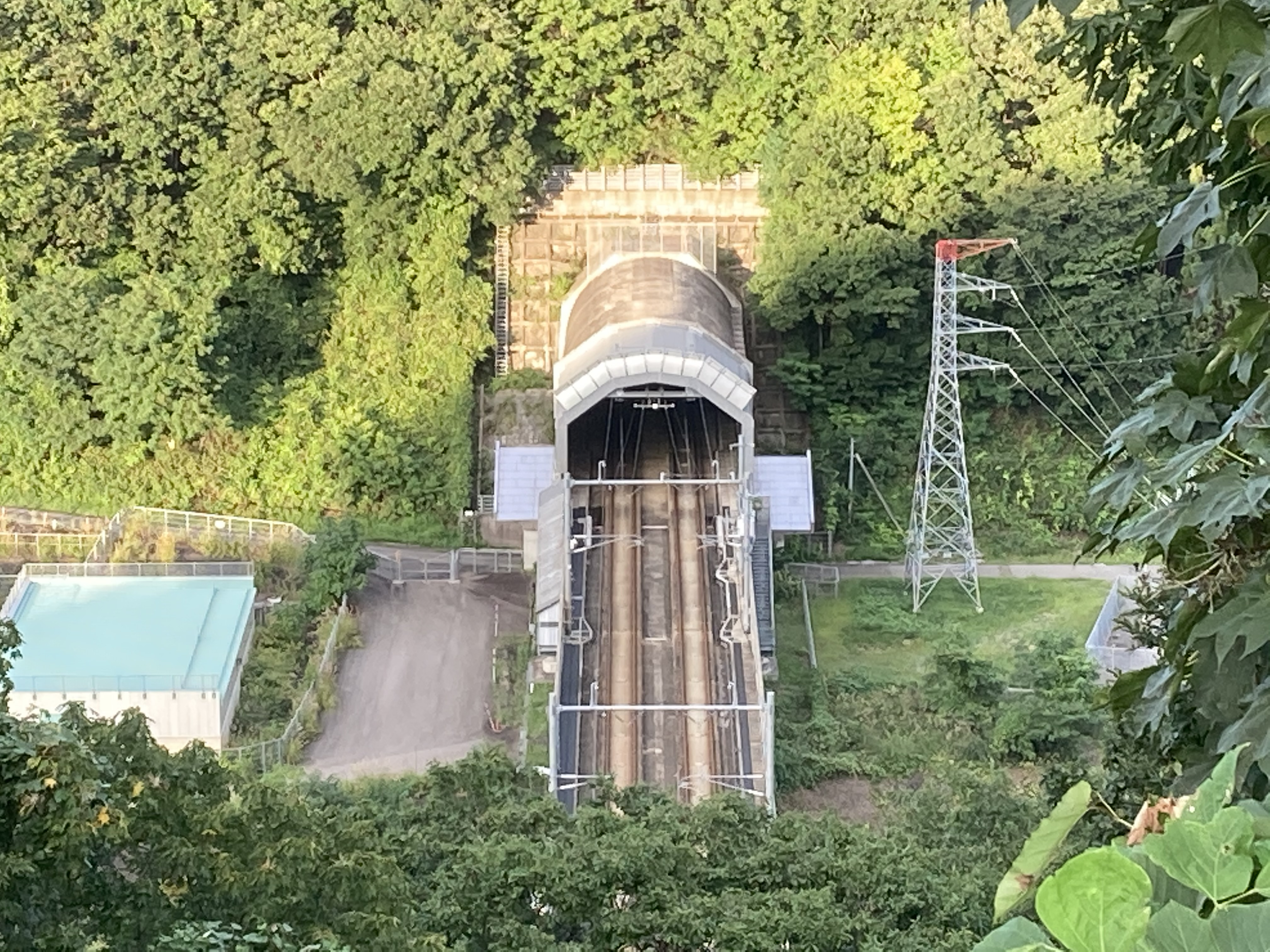
- The western portal of the Hakkōda Tunnel
- Interactive map of Hakkōda Tunnel

Overview
- Official name: Japanese: 八甲田トンネル
- Line: Tōhoku Shinkansen
- Location: Japan (Aomori Prefecture)
- Coordinates: 40°46′44.6″N 140°55′49.7″E
- System: Shinkansen
- Crosses: Hakkōda Mountains
- Start: Shichinohe
- End: Aomori

Operation
- Work began: August 1998
- Opened: 19 November 2010
- Owner: JR East
- Traffic: Shinkansen
- Character: Passenger

Technical
- Length: 26.445 km (16.432 mi)
- No. of tracks: 1 double-track tube
- Track gauge: 1,435 mm (4 ft 8 1/2 in)
- Electrified: 25 kV AC, 50 Hz, overhead catenary
- Operating speed: Maximum speed: 260 km/h (160 mph)
- Grade: max 10 ‰

The Hakkōda Tunnel (八甲田トンネル, Hakkōda tonneru) is a 26.445-kilometer-long (16.432 mi) railway tunnel located in central Aomori Prefecture, in the Tōhoku region of Japan. It passes under the Hakkōda mountain range and links the town of Shichinohe with the city of Aomori.

The Hakkōda Tunnel is part of the northern section of the Tōhoku Shinkansen, located between Shichinohe-Towada and Shin Aomori stations.

== Description ==
The Hakkōda Tunnel, with a length of 26.445 kilometers (16.432 mi) is the third longest double-tracked, single-tube terrestrial railway tunnel in the world and the longest terrestrial railway tunnel in Japan, though the Oshima Tunnel in southern Hokkaido is set to surpass it upon its planned completion in 2031. It is also the first rail route to pass through the Hakkōda Mountains.

The east portal of the tunnel lies 5 kilometers (3.1 mi) from Shichinohe-Towada Station in Shichinohe. From there the tunnel runs parallel to the Michinoku Toll Road, an older limited-access road that travels across the northern Hakkōda Mountains by a series of long tunnels. The west portal of the tunnel lies at the eastern bank of the Komagome River in Aomori.

The completion of the tunnel and the subsequent extension of the Tōhoku Shinkansen to Aomori resulted in a decrease in the length of a trip from Tokyo to Aomori by 40 minutes and the elimination of the Tsugaru express train between Hachinohe and Aomori.

== History ==
=== Background ===
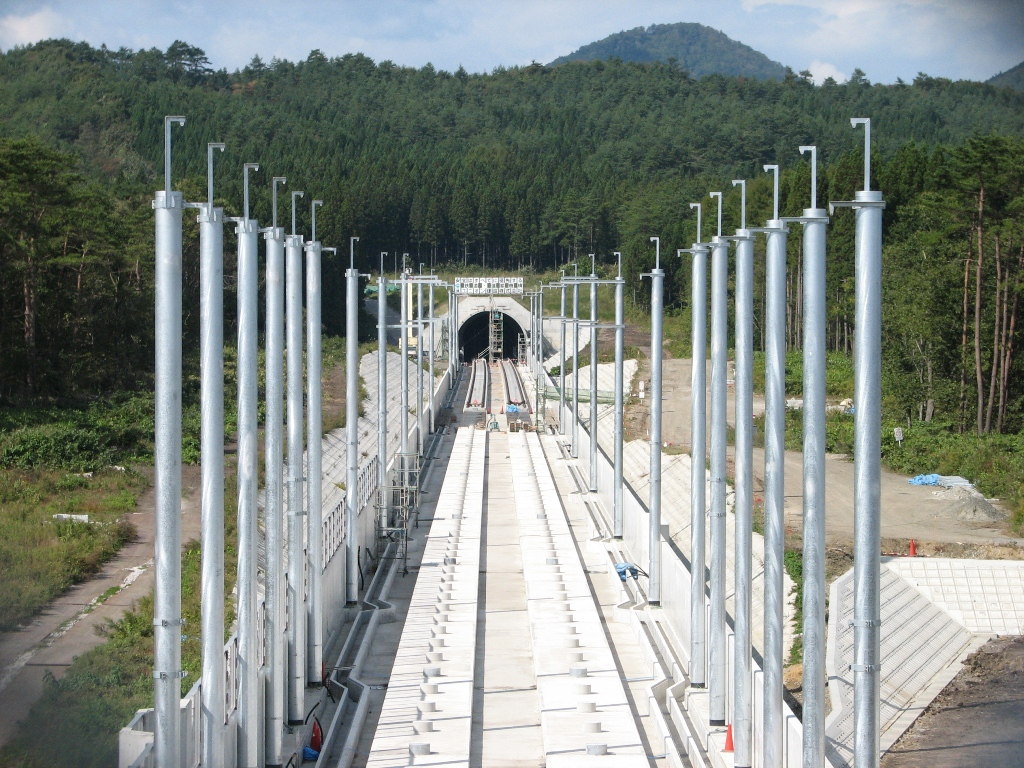
The Hakkōda Tunnel under construction

The Hakkōda Mountains have divided what is now Aomori Prefecture since the Edo period. The lands to the east of the mountains were controlled by the Nanbu clan and the lands to the west were controlled by the Tsugaru clan. After the Meiji Restoration, their lands were reorganized into Aomori Prefecture with the city of Aomori as its capital. However, no direct land route was available between and the former center of the Nanbu's Hachinohe Domain, Hachinohe because of the mountains. The Edo era Ōshū Kaidō instead went north around the mountain range, closely following the rocky coast in many places, such as Asamushi Onsen. When the Tōhoku Main Line was built to connect Aomori to Tokyo, the same indirect path was utilized.

Efforts were still made to cross the Hakkōda Mountains. In an exercise to prepare for the destruction of the railway during a war with the Russian Empire, the Hakkōda Mountains incident occurred when 199 soldiers of the Imperial Japanese Army got lost and died, just south of where the tunnel now lies.

The first direct connection between Aomori and Hachinohe, the Michinoku Toll Road, was completed on 13 November 1980. The toll road utilized many tunnels to cross the Hakkōda Mountains and set the precedent for a high-speed rail route to supplement it and the indirect Tōhoku Main Line.

=== Construction ===
Preliminary work on the tunnel began in August 1998, with ground broken in June 1999. On its breakthrough on 27 February 2005, it surpassed the Iwate-Ichinohe Tunnel of the same Tōhoku Shinkansen to become the world's longest terrestrial (land-based) tunnel. This record was surpassed only two months later by the Lötschberg Base Tunnel in Switzerland, and in turn by the Gotthard Base Tunnel when it opened in 2016. However, the Lötschberg Base Tunnel has only a single track for most of its length, while the Gotthard Base Tunnel has two single-track tubes, and therefore the Hakkōda Tunnel remains the longest double-tracked, single-tube terrestrial railway tunnel in the world.

=== Opening ===
Test runs of the Shinkansen in the tunnel commenced on 19 November 2010, an emergency evacuation of the train in the tunnel was exercised. JR East's Tōhoku Shinkansen officially began services through the tunnel between Shichinohe-Towada Station and Shin-Aomori Station on 4 December 2010.

== Bibliography ==
- Kimura, Hirotoshi; Sasaki, Mikio (2005). "Breakthrough of Hakkoda Tunnel in Tohoku Shinkansen (Superexpress railway)". Journal of Tunnels and Underground. 36 (6): 471–479. ISSN 0285-631X. Archived from the original on 2012-03-13.
