= Fusanosuke =

- Gender: Male

Origin
- Origin: Japanese
- Meaning: Different meanings depending on the kanji used

Fusanosuke (written: 房之助 or 房之介) is a masculine Japanese given name. Notable people with the name include:

- Fusanosuke Gotō (後藤 房之助; 1879–1924), Japanese soldier and amputee
- Fusanosuke Kuhara (久原 房之助; 1869–1965), Japanese businessman and politician
- Fusanosuke Natsume (夏目 房之介; born 1950), Japanese writer and cartoonist
