= Naofumi =

- Gender: Male

Origin
- Origin: Japanese
- Meaning: Different meanings depending on the kanji used

Naofumi (written: 尚文, 尚史 or 脩史) is a masculine Japanese given name. Notable people with the name include:

- Naofumi Hataya (幡谷 尚史; born 1966), Japanese video game composer
- Naofumi Yamamoto (山本 尚史; born 1977), Japanese professional wrestler, boxer and mixed martial artist
- Tatsumi Naofumi (立見 尚文; 1845–1907), Japanese general

== Fictional characters ==
- Naofumi Iwatani (岩谷 尚文), the main protagonist of the light novel series The Rising of the Shield Hero
