= 8th Division (Imperial Japanese Army) =

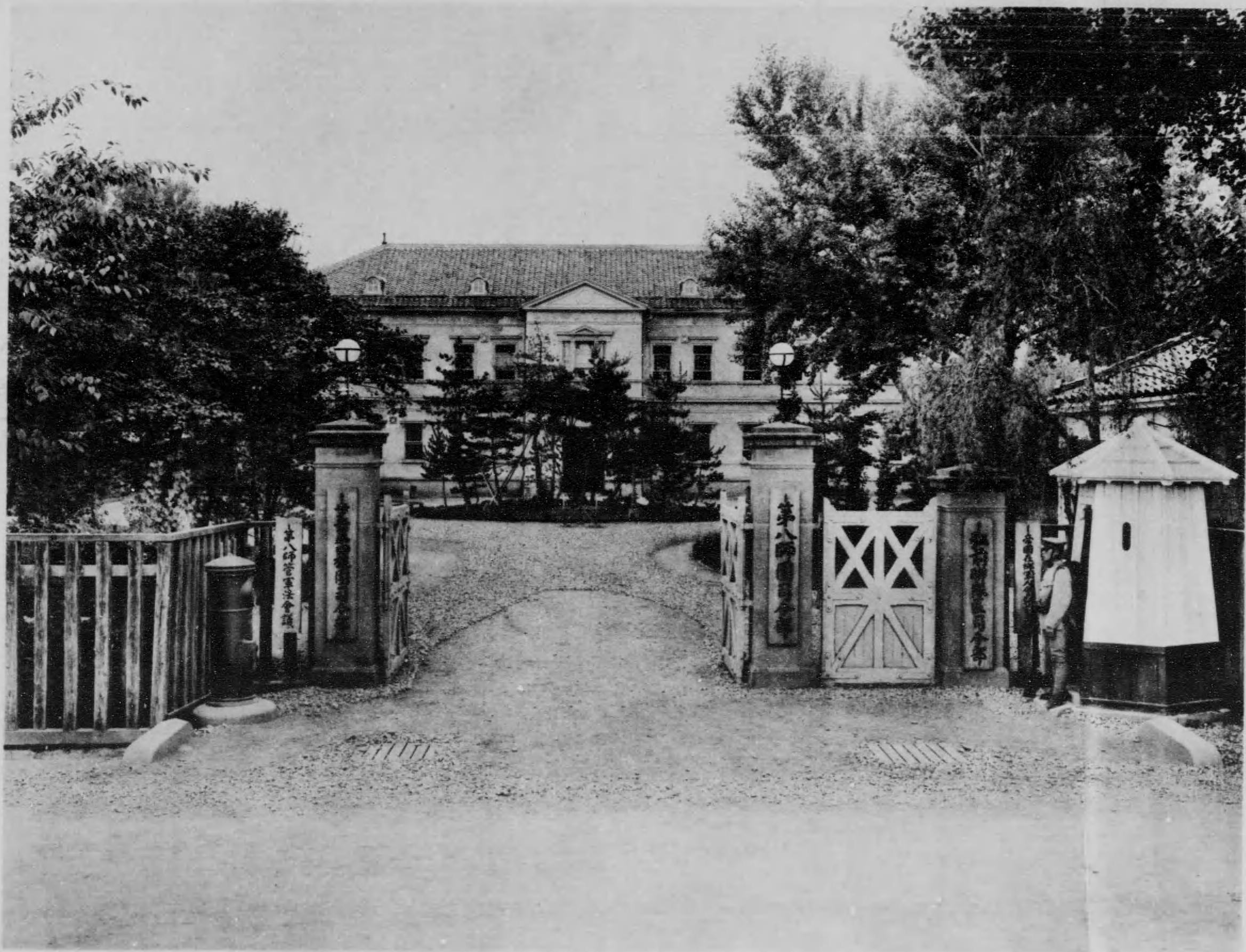
- Headquarters of the Eighth Division of Japan about 1915
- Active: 1898 – 1945
- Country: Empire of Japan
- Branch: Imperial Japanese Army
- Type: Infantry
- Garrison/HQ: See: Hirosaki, Aomori Prefecture, Tōhoku region, Empire of Japan August 1, 1937; Mudanjiang, Heilongjiang, Manchukuo December 8, 1941; Rodriguez, Rizal, Luzon, Second Philippine Republic August 15, 1945
- Nicknames: Cedar Division (杉兵団, Sugi-heidan)
- Engagements: Russo-Japanese War; Battle of Sandepu; Battle of Mukden; Second Sino-Japanese War; Manchurian Incident; Inner Mongolian Campaign; Defense of the Great Wall; Battle of Rehe; Pacific War; Philippines campaign (1944–1945); Battle of Leyte; Battle of Manila (1945)

Commanders
- Notable commanders: Tatsumi Naofumi; Takashi Hishikari; Jinzaburō Masaki; Toshinari Maeda; Masaki Honda; Shizuo Yokoyama

The 8th Division (第8師団, Dai-hachi Shidan) was an infantry division in the Imperial Japanese Army. It was formed 1 October 1898 in Hirosaki, Aomori, as one of the six new reserve divisions created after the First Sino-Japanese War and was annihilated in the Philippines during the Pacific War at Rodriguez, Rizal in 1945. Its Tsūshōgō (code name) was Sugi (杉, "Cryptomeria"). The 8th Division consisted of troops from the Tōhoku region of Japan, primarily Aomori, Akita and Yamagata Prefectures. Its first commander was General Tatsumi Naofumi, formerly commander of the Sendai Garrison.

== Division history ==
As the tensions with Russia grew after the First Sino-Japanese War and Triple Intervention, the 8th Division was engaged in intensive cold-climate training, setting the stage for the infamous Hakkōda Mountains incident in January 1902, where 199 of 210 members of its 5th Infantry Regiment froze to death in Hakkōda Mountains.

After the Russo-Japanese War began, the 8th Division was mobilized in June 1904. It was initially earmarked for a projected Japanese invasion of Primorskaya Oblast on the Siberian mainland, but was sent as a reserve force for the Siege of Port Arthur instead after that plan was shelved. It was then earmarked for the proposed invasion of Sakhalin, but the 13th Division was sent instead. The 8th Division remained in reserve until assigned as reinforcements at the Battle of Sandepu in January 1905. It acted with distinction, repelling a Russian counterattack together with the 5th Division. In February 1905, the division participated in Battle of Mukden.

From 1910, the 8th Division was assigned to garrison duties in Korea, and it also participated in the Siberian Intervention starting in 1921. During Siberian Intervention, the 8th division was assigned to garrison Khabarovsk Krai and Amur Oblast.

The 8th Division (initially only the 4th Brigade participated in the Japanese invasion of Manchuria in the aftermath of the Mukden Incident in September 1931 and was assigned to Jiandao. The bulk of the division arrived in April 1932, and the division was at the Battle of Rehe from February 1933. It subsequently remained in Manchukuo as a garrison force. From 1937, the 8th division was subordinated to the Kwantung Army. On 13 January 1938, the division was assigned to 3rd Army remaining in Suiyang County. In 1939, its 32nd Infantry Regiment was transferred to the newly formed 24th Division, thus converting 8th Division to a triangular format. The division participated in the Kantokuen special training maneuvers in July 1941. On 19 September 1941, the 8th Division was subordinated to the 20th Army to perform a defense duty at the Soviet Union border, together with the 25th Division. It remained in Manchukuo through most of the early stages of the Pacific War.

In February 1944, three detachments were formed (infantry battalion, artillery battalion and engineers company). These were combined into 11th Independent Mixed Regiment, and sent to Poluwat in June 1944, as the war situation in the Pacific grew increasingly difficult for Japan. Because of the lack of food and large number of wounded due American air raids, two of the three battalions were relocated to Truk in September 1944.

In July 1944, the 8th Division was reassigned from Mudanjiang to the Philippines under the command of General Yamashita Tomoyuki's 14th Area Army. Sea transfer to Luzon started 10 August 1944 and was complete by 22 September 1944. The 5th Infantry Regiment of 8th Division was transferred to Leyte in late July 1944, and by late December 1944 was nearly completely annihilated during the course of the Battle of Leyte. The remainder of the division still in Luzon were assigned to the 41st Army on 1 January 1945 and suffered heavy losses during the Battle of Manila in January 1945.

The remnants of the 8th Division ceased fighting 2 September 1945 in Rodriguez, Rizal due to the surrender of Japan. Dissolution of the division was completed in December 1947. Notably, the Japanese holdout Hiroo Onoda, was from the 8th Division and did not surrender until 9 March 1974.

== See also ==
- List of Japanese Infantry Divisions

== Bibliography ==
- Madej, W. Victor. Japanese Armed Forces Order of Battle, 1937-1945 [2 vols]. Allentown, PA: 1981
- This article incorporates material from the Japanese Wikipedia page 第8師団 (日本軍)
