= Tatsumi Naofumi =

Japanese samurai and general (1845–1907)

Baron Tatsumi Naofumi
- 立見 尚文
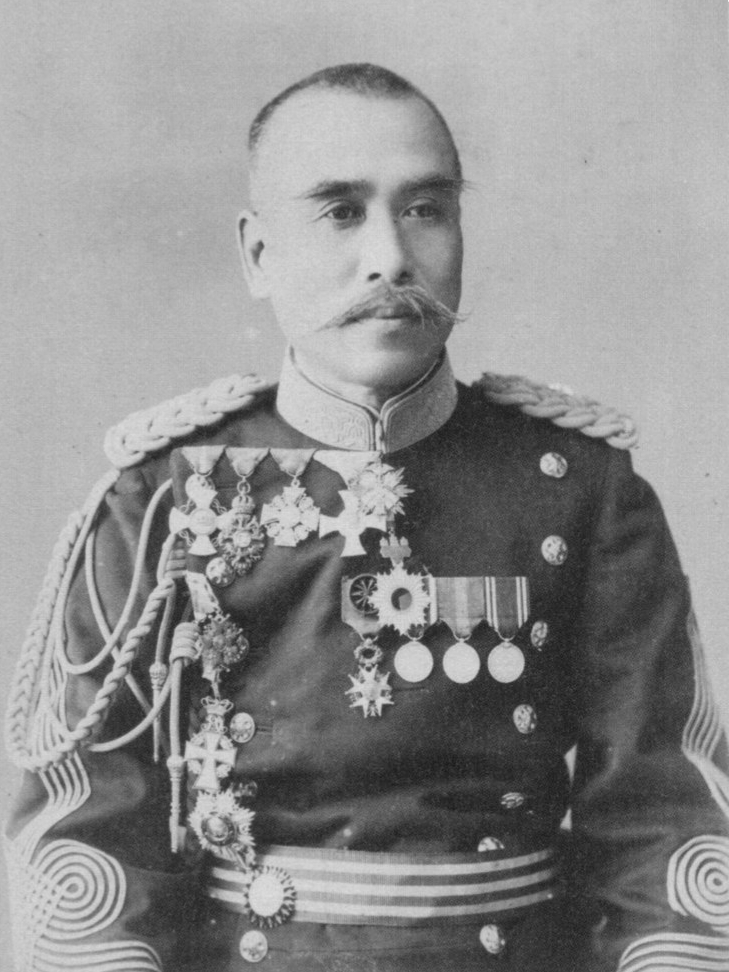
- Tatsumi Naofumi as major general (1894-98)
- Born: August 21, 1845; Edo, Japan
- Died: March 6, 1907 (aged 61); Tokyo, Japan
- Military career
- Allegiance: Tokugawa shogunate (1867–1871); Empire of Japan (1877–1907)
- Branch: Imperial Japanese Army
- Service years: 1867–1871, 1877–1907
- Rank: General
- Commands: Shinsenryodan, IJA 8th Division
- Conflicts: Boshin War; Battle of Utsunomiya Castle; Battle of Hokuetsu; Battle of Aizu; Satsuma Rebellion; First Sino-Japanese War; Battle of Pyongyang (1894); Russo-Japanese War; Battle of Sandepu; Battle of Mukden

Baron Tatsumi Naofumi (立見 尚文; 21 August 1845 – 6 March 1907) was a samurai from the Kuwana Domain in the Bakumatsu period Tokugawa shogunate and later a general in the Imperial Japanese Army during the Meiji period.

== Biography ==
=== Early life ===
Tatsumi was born in Edo as the third son of a retainer of Kuwana Domain name Machida Dendaiyu. He was later adopted by his uncle, a fellow retainer named Tatsumi Sakujuro Takashi, whose surname he took. He was also known as Tatsumi Kanzaburō (立見鑑三郎) in his youth. At age five, the young Tatsumi went to Kuwana with his adoptive father, and at age 8 entered the domain school, Rikkyokan, studying literature and martial arts, and receiving a commendation for academic excellence at age 15. Soon after, Matsudaira Sadaaki became daimyō of Kuwana, and Tatsumi became his page, with a 180 koku stipend. Together with Matsudaira Sadaaki, he left for Edo in 1861, where was permitted to attend the elite Shogunate school at Shoheiko, and where he was hailed as a prodigy.

=== Soldier in the Boshin War ===
When Matsudaira Sadaaki was appointed as Kyoto Shoshidai, Tatsumi followed him to Kyoto, where he served as a liaison with other domains. It was in this role that he met many of the men who would later become famous in the Meiji period, including Katsura Kogorō, Ōkubo Toshimichi, and Saigō Takamori. Before long, though, he was transferred back to Edo and entered the Tokugawa bakufu's French-trained infantry. His French military instructors were said to have remarked, "Tatsumi is a genius of a soldier." He later served in the Bakufu's 3rd Infantry Regiment.

The first battle of the Boshin War, the Battle of Toba–Fushimi, occurred while he was in Edo. When Matsudaira Sadaaki returned, Tatsumi advocated continued military opposition to the Satchō Alliance army. Tatsumi and the Kuwana retainers remaining in Edo followed Matsudaira Sadaaki to Echigo Province by sea, where they hoped to establish themselves in the former Shogunal territory of Kashiwazaki. Tatsumi organized the remaining Kuwana forces into three units—the Raijintai, the Jinputai, and the Chinintai. Elections were held to determine the commanders of each unit, and Tatsumi became commander of the Raijintai, and his elder brother Machida Ronoshin became commander of the Jinputai. Through well-coordinated guerilla tactics, Tatsumi managed to fight his way to Kashiwazaki. Joining up with Matsudaira Sadaaki in Kashiwazaki, he continued to fight against the new Meiji government's army, first independently, and then in concert with the Nagaoka Domain. However, when Nagaoka was defeated, the Kuwana forces retreated further north, to Aizu Domain, ruled by Matsudaira Sadaaki's birth brother, Matsudaira Katamori. Tatsumi fought in the Aizu campaign, and led the Kuwana forces even north on Matsudaira Sadaaki's orders to join the Ōuetsu Reppan Dōmei, surrendering in Shōnai Domain (present-day Yamagata Prefecture) some time later.

It is said that Yamagata Aritomo maintained a lifelong dislike for Tatsumi, stemming from his experiences facing Tatsumi's "guerrilla-style" tactics. These same tactical abilities, however, were later utilized during the Russo-Japanese War.

=== Under the Meiji government ===
Following the end of the Boshin War, Tatsumi was placed in confinement in January 1871, and changed his given name to Naofumi. However, he was soon pardoned by the new government, and returned to Kuwana Domain as a junior councilor after pleading his loyalty to Emperor Meiji. He accepted a post as a prosecutor at the Ministry of Justice from April 1873 and was promoted steadily until he reached the position of chief prosecutor at the Tokyo District Court in May 1877.

However, the following month, in response to the Satsuma Rebellion, he joined the Imperial Japanese Army and was given the rank of major. He served as chief-of-staff of the Shinsenryodan, a unit composed of former Kuwana samurai and members of the Shinsengumi. He commanded the IJA 10th Infantry Regiment and later the IJA 8th Infantry Regiment during the Satsuma Rebellion. Afterwards, in February 1879 he was appointed commandant of the Osaka Garrison. In July 1880, he became chief-of-staff of the Imperial Guard. He was promoted to lieutenant colonel in February 1884 and in May 1885 was commander of the Guards 3rd Infantry. From August 1886 to December 1887, he was aide-de-camp to Prince Komatsu Akihito, and accompanied him overseas on diplomatic missions to England, France, Germany and Russia, as well as the Ottoman Empire. He was promoted to colonel in November 1887. After his return to Japan, he was chief-of-staff of the IJA 3rd Division from March 1889.

Tatsumi was promoted to major general in June 1894 and was assigned command of the IJA 10th Infantry Brigade. During the First Sino-Japanese War he was distinguished by his role in the 1894 Battle of Pyongyang. After the end of the war, He was ennobled with the rank of danshaku (baron) under the kazoku peerage system in August 1895.After the war, he was briefly commandant of the Army Staff College, and was then head of the Japanese military bureau within the Government-General of Taiwan from April 1896.

He was promoted to lieutenant general in October 1898 and was placed in command of the newly formed IJA 8th Division. The infamous Hakkōda Mountains incident in which 199 of 210 members of its 5th Infantry Regiment froze to death in Hakkōda Mountains during training exercise occurred during his command. Tatsumi subsequently led the division into combat during the Russo-Japanese War. Two of the principal battles of his military career were at Sandepu and Mukden in 1905. He was promoted to full general in May 1906, but retired two months later and died the following March.

== Decorations ==
- 1892 – Order of the Sacred Treasure, 3rd class
- 1895 – Order of the Rising Sun, 3rd class
- 1895 – Order of the Golden Kite, 3rd class
- 1897 – Order of the Sacred Treasure, 2nd class
- 1904 – Grand Cordon of the Order of the Sacred Treasure
- 1906 – Grand Cordon of the Order of the Rising Sun
- 1906 – Order of the Golden Kite, 2nd class
