= Tsugaru Iwaki Skyline =

- 津軽岩木スカイライン (Tsugaru Iwaki Sukairain)
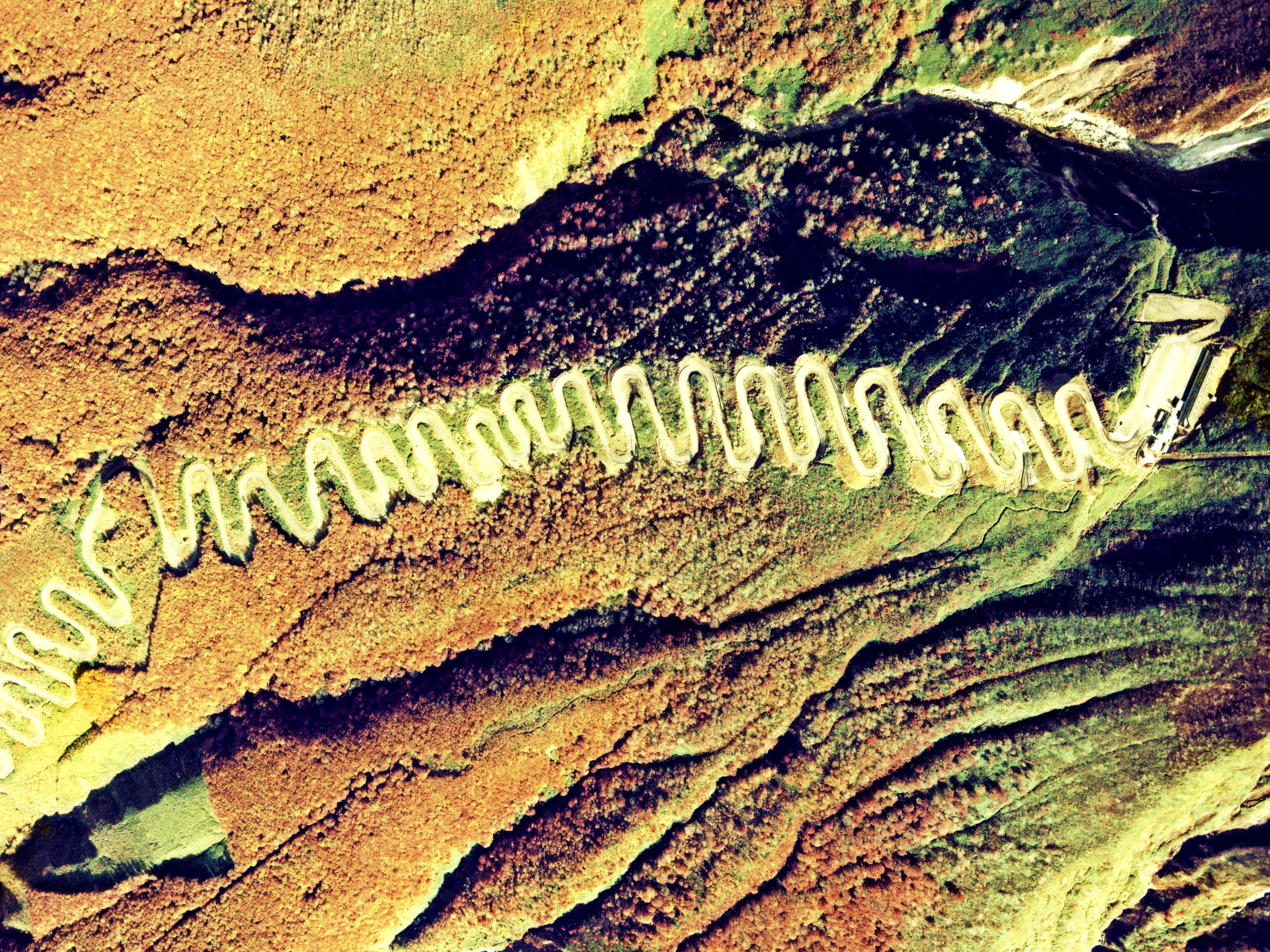

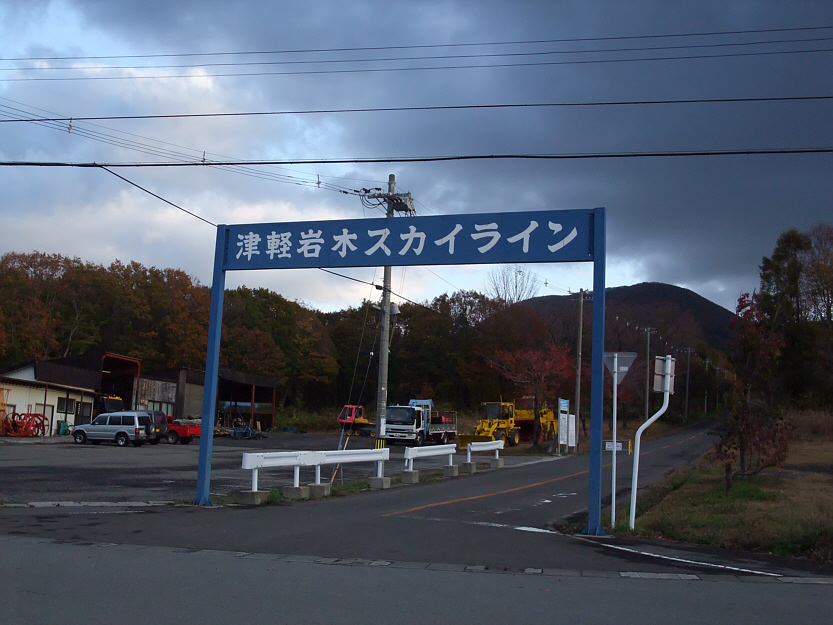

Route information
- Maintained by Iwaki Skyline Co., Ltd of Kōnan Bus Company
- Length: 9.3 km (5.8 mi)
- Existed: 25 August 1960–present
- Known for: 69 hairpin turns to ascend/descend Mount Iwaki
- Restrictions: Closed during winter from early November to April, weather permitting. Open from 8:00 AM to 5:00 PM.

Major junctions
- West end: Aomori Prefecture Route 3 near Dake Onsen in Hirosaki, Aomori
- East end: Eighth Station of Mount Iwaki

Location
- Country: Japan

Highway system
- National highways of Japan; Expressways of Japan

The Tsugaru Iwaki Skyline (津軽岩木スカイライン, Tsugaru Iwaki Sukairain) is a toll road managed and operated by Iwaki Skyline Co., Ltd. in Hirosaki, Japan. It partially ascends Mount Iwaki and is notable for its steep gradient and 69 hairpin turns, which make it considered as one of the most dangerous mountain roads in the world.

== Route description ==
The Tsugaru Iwaki Skyline is a toll road in the outskirts of the city of Hirosaki which partially ascends Mount Iwaki and is notable for its steep gradient and 69 hairpin turns. The road ascends 806 meters (2,644 ft) over an average gradient of 8.66%, with some sections going up to a 10% gradient. The road terminates at the eighth station on Mount Iwaki, a stratovolcano, at which point a chairlift is available from the eighth station to the ninth station. The Tsugaru Iwaki Skyline has been considered one of the most dangerous mountain roads in the world. Both the road and the chairlift are managed and operated by Iwaki Skyline Co., Ltd., a subsidiary of Kōnan Bus Company.

=== Tolls ===
The prices listed are for a round trip up and down the road, as of 2017:

- Motorcycles: ¥1000
- Kei car: ¥1500
- Standard-sized car: ¥1800
- Mini bus: ¥4500
- Large vehicles (defined as 30+ people, or a total weight of at least 8,000 kilograms (18,000 lb)): ¥7200
- Bicycles: The road is closed to bicycles except in the event of the annual Mount Iwaki Hill Climb Challenge, which takes place in late June.

== History ==
Construction on the Tsugaru Iwaki Skyline began in April 1958. When the road opened on 25 August 1960 as part of the Kōnan Bus Expressway Division it was the first toll road in Aomori Prefecture. In 1972 a one-way chairlift was added, starting from the eighth station, where the road ends, up to the 9th station. In 1993 the chairlift was upgraded to allow for two-way travel. In April 1999, the company operating Tsugaru Iwaki Skyline and the chairlift changed its name to "Iwaki Skyline Co., Ltd."

== Major intersections ==
The route lies entirely within Aomori Prefecture.

Location	km	mi	Destinations	Notes
Hirosaki	0.0	0.0	Aomori Prefecture Route 3	Western terminus
Hirosaki	9.3	5.8	Eighth Station of Mount Iwaki	Eastern terminus, parking lot for chairlift
1.000 mi = 1.609 km; 1.000 km = 0.621 mi

== See also ==
- Mount Iwaki
- Hakkōda Ropeway
