= Iwakisan =

Iwakisan may refer to:

- 11092 Iwakisan, asteroid
- Mount Iwaki, stratovolcano
