= Komagome =

Komagome may refer to:

- Komagome River, a river in Japan
- Komagome Station, a railway station in Toshima, Tokyo, Japan
