= Mt. Hakkoda (2014 film) =

Mount Hakkoda
- Film poster
- Directed by: Satoshi Miyata
- Screenplay by: Satoshi Miyata
- Story by: Koshu Ogasawara
- Produced by: Paulo Vicario; Francesco Colussi; Satoshi Miyata
- Starring: Takahito Arai; Seiji Kawada; Yuma Sato; Yuta Moriya
- Cinematography: Masaaki Ogushi
- Music by: Chikuzan Takahashi
- Release date: April 26, 2014
- Running time: 88 minutes
- Countries: Japan; Italy
- Language: English

Mt. Hakkoda (ドキュメンタリー八甲田山, Documentary Hakkōda san) is a 2014 film about the Hakkōda Mountains incident. It is based on the non-fiction book Tragedy in a Blizzard by Koshu Ogasawara.

== Cast ==
- Atsushi Takahashi as Lt.Colonel Tsugawa
- Seiji Kawada as Major Yamaguchi
- Takahito Arai as Captain Kannari
- Akinori Sumiyoshi as Lieutenant Ito
- Katsuhiko Tanabe as Second Lieutenant Mikami
- Taichi Ishida as Medical Officer Nagai
- Yuma Sato as Corporal Obara
- Yuta Moriya as Corporal Fusanosuke Goto
- Makoto Sasaki as Corporal Muramatsu
- Toshiya Toya as Corporal Oikawa
- Hitoshi Hasegawa as Village Elder
- Amy Kubo as Sachiyo Goto (Cpl Goto's wife)

== Production ==
The scenes in which the 5th Infantry Regiment gradually lose their way were filmed on location in the Hakkōda Mountains. Most of the victims died at Narusawa on January 25, their second day bivouacking in the snow. Scenes set there were shot on site at exactly the same day and time, and the entire cast and crew offered a silent prayer for the victims.

== See also ==
- Mount Hakkoda (1977 film), an earlier film about the same incident
