= Iwakiyama Shrine =

Shinto shrine in Aomori Prefecture, Japan

Iwakiyama Jinja 岩木山神社
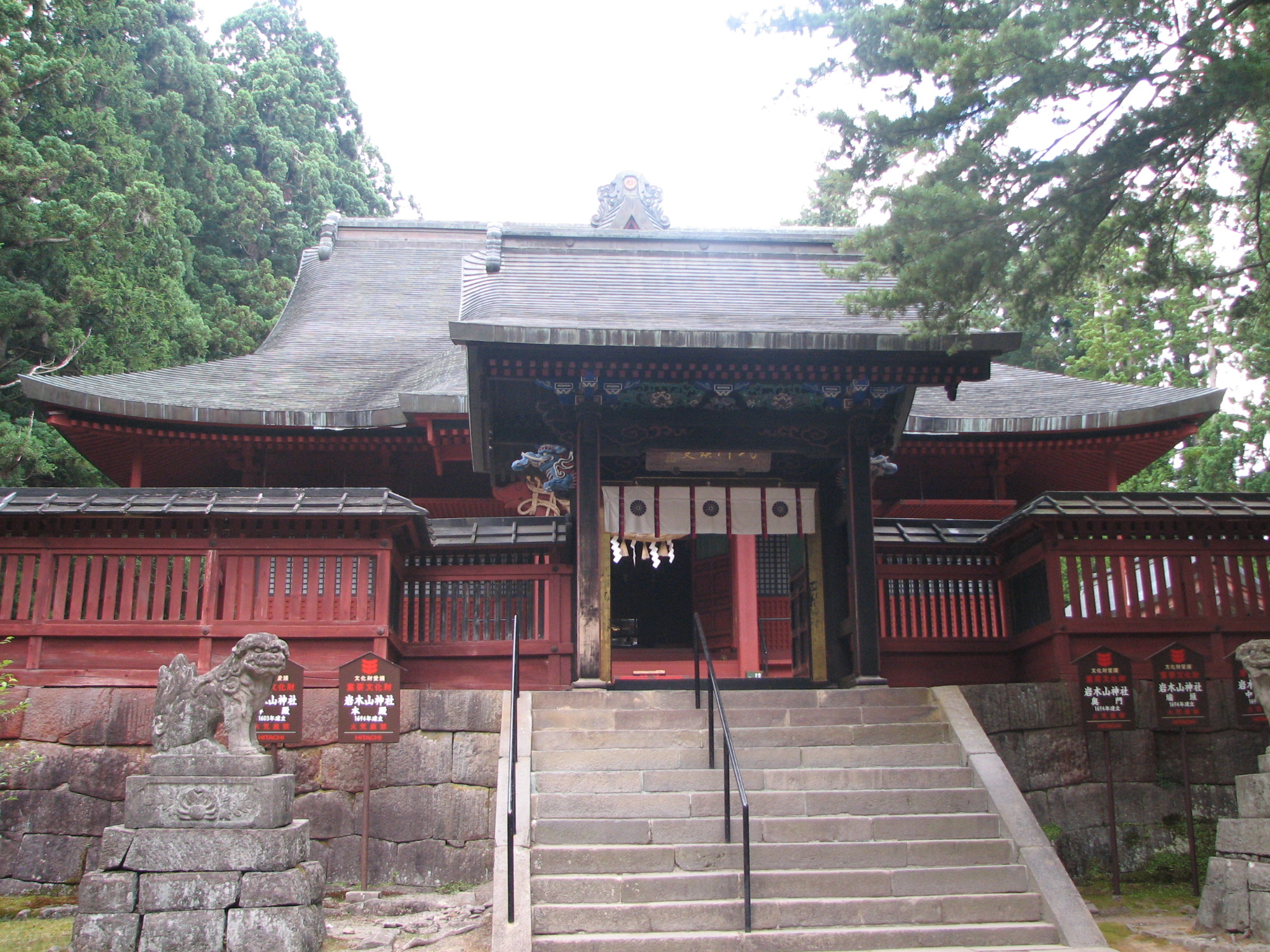
- Heiden of Iwakiyama Jinja

- Location within Aomori Prefecture Location within Japan

Religion
- Affiliation: Shinto
- Deity: Ōkuninushi

Location
- Location: Aomori-ken, Hirosakishi, Hyakuzawa
- Coordinates: 40°36′57.82″N 140°21′55.64″E

Architecture
- Established: 780

Iwakiyama Shrine (岩木山神社, Iwakiyama jinja) is a Shintō shrine in the city of Hirosaki in Aomori Prefecture, Japan. It is the ichinomiya of former Tsugaru Domain. All of Mount Iwaki is considered to be a portion of the shrine.

The main festival of the shrine, the Oyama-sankei, features a parade from the shrine to the top of the mountain, and is held annually at the time of the autumn equinox. The pilgrims carry colorful banners and are accompanied by traditional drums and flutes

== Enshrined kami ==
The primary kami of Iwakiyama Shrine is the Ōkuninushi (大国主), referred to here as Utsushikuniotama-no-kami (顕国魂神). Other kami include Tatsubihime-no-kami (多都比姫神), Ōyamatsumi (大山祇神), Sakanoue no Karitamaro-no-mikoto (坂上刈田麿), Ukanome-no-mikoto (宇賀能賣神), and Oyamakui no Kami (大山咋神).

== History ==
The foundation of the Iwakiyama Shrine predates the historical period, and Mount Iwaki was a holy mountain for the local Emishi tribes. Per shrine tradition, the shrine was established on the summit of Mount Iwaki in the year 780. It was rebuilt by the folk-hero Sakanoue no Tamuramaro in the year 800 and dedicated to his father Sakanoue no Karitamaro. Several subsidiary shrines were built around the base of the mountain in an area called the Tokoshinai (十腰内) by the local inhabitants. One of these subsidiary shrines to the southeast of the mountain developed into the Shingon sect Buddhist temple of Hyakutaku-ji (百沢寺) in 1091, and became the predecessor of the present shrine. The three main peaks on Mount Iwaki were identified with the Buddhist deities of Amida Nyorai, Yakushi Nyorai and Kannon Bosatsu.

During the Meiji period’s government-ordered separation of Buddhism from Shinto, the temple became a Shinto shrine. In 1871, it was officially designated one of the kokuhei-shōsha (国幣小社), or 3rd ranked national shrine under the State Shinto system until 1946.

== Notable structures ==
Many of the structures of Iwakiyama Shrine date from the early Edo period, and were built in 1694 under the sponsorship of the Tsugaru clan of Hirosaki Domain. The two-story main gate (Ryōmon) was built in 1628. The Honden, Heiden, Oku-no-mon and Ryōmon are built in the yosegi-zukuri style with decorative wood carvings, which have given the shrine its nickname of “Oku-Nikko” after the more famous structures of the Nikkō Tōshō-gū. All of these buildings are registered as National Important Cultural Properties.

== See also ==
- List of Shinto shrines
- Modern system of ranked Shinto Shrines
