= Raijintai =

Japanese guerrilla warfare unit

The Raijintai (雷神隊) was a Japanese guerrilla warfare unit of the Kuwana domain, formed in 1868 during the Boshin War, for the purposes of fighting on behalf of the Northern Alliance of Confederated Domains. Led by Tatsumi Naofumi, the unit excelled in combat, particularly becoming renowned for taking the head of Kiheitai officer Tokiyama Naohachi in the fighting at Asahiyama.

Along with the whole of the northern clans and the pro-Tokugawa forces loosely allied with them, the Raijintai was defeated in the Boshin War and was disbanded.
