= Hakkōda Mountains =

Volcanic complex in Aomori Prefecture, Japan

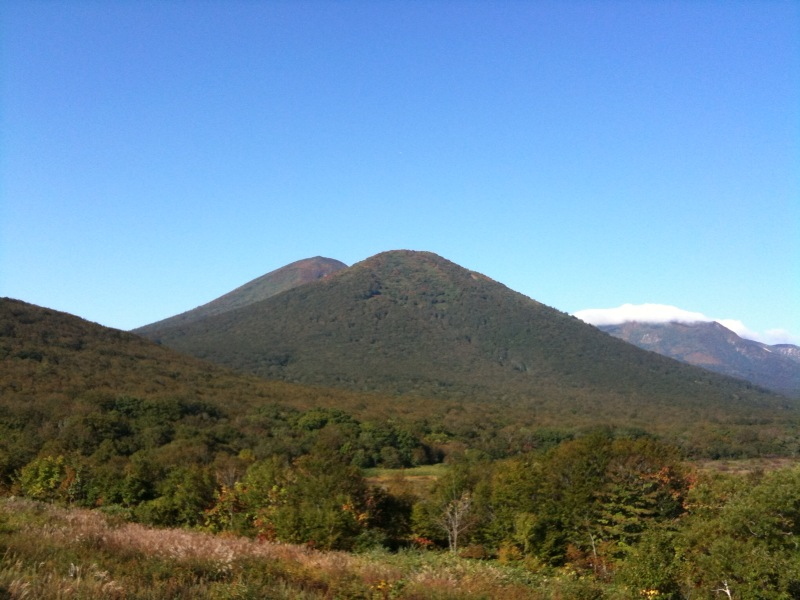
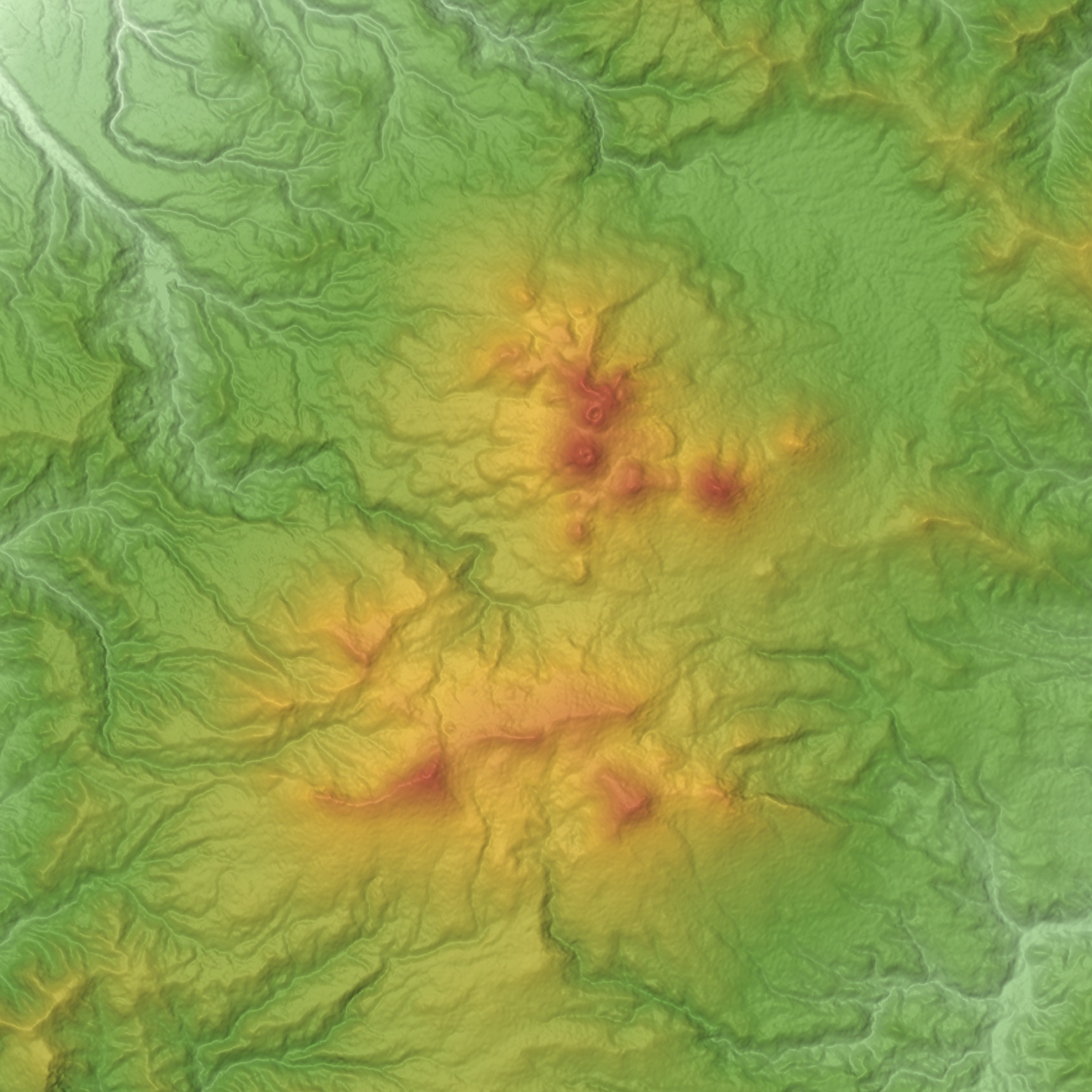
- (above) The Hakkōda Mountains viewed from the southeast (below) The topography of the Hakkōda Mountains group

Highest point
- Peak: Mount Ōdake
- Elevation: 1,584 m (5,197 ft)
- Listing: List of mountains in Japan; 100 Famous Japanese Mountains
- Coordinates: 40°39′32″N 140°52′38″E

Naming
- Native name: 八甲田山系 (Japanese); Hakkōda-sankei (Japanese)

Geography
- Country: Japan
- Prefecture: Aomori Prefecture
- Region: Tōhoku
- Parent range: Ōu Mountains
- Biome: Alpine climate

Geology
- Rock type: Volcanic
- Volcanic arc: Northeastern Japan Arc
- Last eruption: 1550

Climbing
- Easiest route: aerial lift/hike via Hakkōda Ropeway and the Hakkōda Ropeway and Hakkoda-odake trails

The Hakkōda Mountains (八甲田山系, Hakkōda-sankei) are an active volcanic complex in south-central Aomori Prefecture, Japan, in Towada-Hachimantai National Park. Often called Mount Hakkōda (八甲田山, Hakkōda-san) or simply Hakkōda (八甲田), the mountains are collectively listed as one of the 100 Famous Japanese Mountains. Its highest peak, Mount Ōdake, lies 21.3 kilometers (13.2 mi) southeast of central Aomori and 28 kilometers (17 mi) west of central Towada and has an elevation of 1,585 meters (5,200 ft). The Hakkōda Mountains are a part of the Ōu Mountains which make up part of the Northeastern Japan Arc, a segment of the Pacific Ring of Fire. The volcanic complex consists of fourteen stratovolcanoes and lava domes arranged into two volcanic groups. The Northern Hakkōda Volcanic Group emerges from the rim of an 8-kilometer-wide (5.0 mi) caldera that dates back to the Pleistocene. The Southern Hakkōda Volcanic Group predates the caldera.

The Hakkōda Mountains attract many climbers, skiers, and sightseers. The mountains offer extensive backcountry skiing in the winter and early spring. There is a lift, the Hakkōda Ropeway in the northern Hakkōda Mountains used by visitors year-round and several hiking trails cross the mountains. While the trails do not pose any technical climbing challenges, Hakkōda presents dangers such as volcanic gases, harsh winter weather, and avalanches. The most notable incident in mountains' history was the Hakkōda Mountains disaster, the worst mountaineering accident in modern history.

== Geographic setting and description ==
After Mount Iwaki, the Hakkōda Mountains contain the second highest peak in Aomori Prefecture, Mount Ōdake with an elevation of 1,585 meters (5,200 ft). Mount Ōdake can be climbed from Sukayu Onsen in about four hours. Heavy snowfall makes the Hakkōda Mountains a prime destination for backcountry and mountain skiers, and there are two mountain huts for overnight trips. The lower slopes of the mountains are forested interspersed with moorland. Above 1,300 meters (4,300 ft), the Alpine climate zone starts.

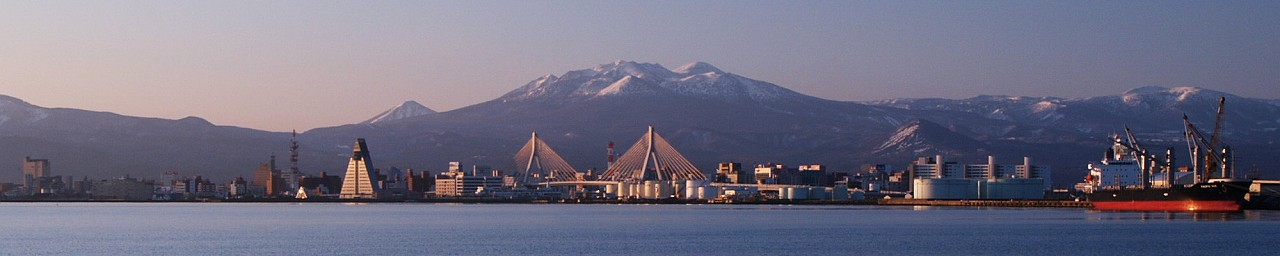
The Hakkōda Mountains as seen from the north. The northern group of the mountains is centered in the background, while the southern group can be seen to their right.

The Hakkōda Mountains, along with Lake Towada and the Oirase Valley, make up the northern section of Towada-Hachimantai National Park. The mountains dominate the southern horizon of the city of Aomori. On a clear day they can be seen on a clear day from Hakodate in Hokkaido.

Though the Hakkōda Mountains are made up of several mountains they are often collectively called Mount Hakkōda (八甲田山, Hakkōda-san) or simply Hakkōda (八甲田). The name Hakkōda is a geographic description of the mountains and their appearance. The first part of the name Hakkō (八甲) 'eight armor' from eight of the mountains having peaks that resemble helmets. The second part of the name da (田) 'field' refers to the mountains' flat plateaus that are referred to as 神の田圃 (kami no tano) 'field of god'.

=== List of peaks ===
Hakkōda Mountains map

The following is a list of peaks and their heights:

- Northern Group:
  - Mount Ōdake (大岳, Ō-dake) 1585 m
  - Mount Takada-Ōdake (高田大岳, Takada-Ō-dake) 1559 m
  - Mount Idodake (井戸岳, Ido-dake) 1537 m
  - Mount Akakuradake (赤倉岳, Akakura-dake) 1548 m
  - Mount Kodake (小岳, Ko-dake) 1478 m
  - Mount Iōdake (硫黄岳, Iō-dake) 1360 m
  - Mount Tamoyachidake (田茂萢岳, Tamoyachi-dake) 1324 m
  - Mount Maedake (前嶽, Mae-dake) 1251.7 m
  - Mount Hinadake (雛岳, Hina-dake) 1240.4 m
  - Mount Ishikuradake (石倉岳, Ishikura-dake) 1202 m
- Southern Group:
  - Kushi Summit (櫛ヶ峯, Kushi-ga-mine) 1516.6 m
    - Includes Mount Kamidake (上岳, Kami-dake) 1516.6 m and Mount Shimodake (下岳, Shimo-dake) 1342 m
  - Mount Norikuradake (乗鞍岳, Norikuradake) 1449.9 m
  - Koma Summit (駒ヶ峯, Koma-ga-mine) 1416.5 m
  - Mount Sarukuradake (猿倉岳, Sarukura-dake) 1353.7 m
  - Mount Yokodake (横岳, Yoko-dake) 1339.6 m
  - Mount Akakuradake (赤倉岳, Akakura-dake) 1297.8 m
  - Mount Minamizawadake (南沢岳, Minamizawa-dake) 1199.0 m
  - Mount Sakasagawadake (逆川岳, Sakasagawa-dake) 1183 m

=== Wetlands ===
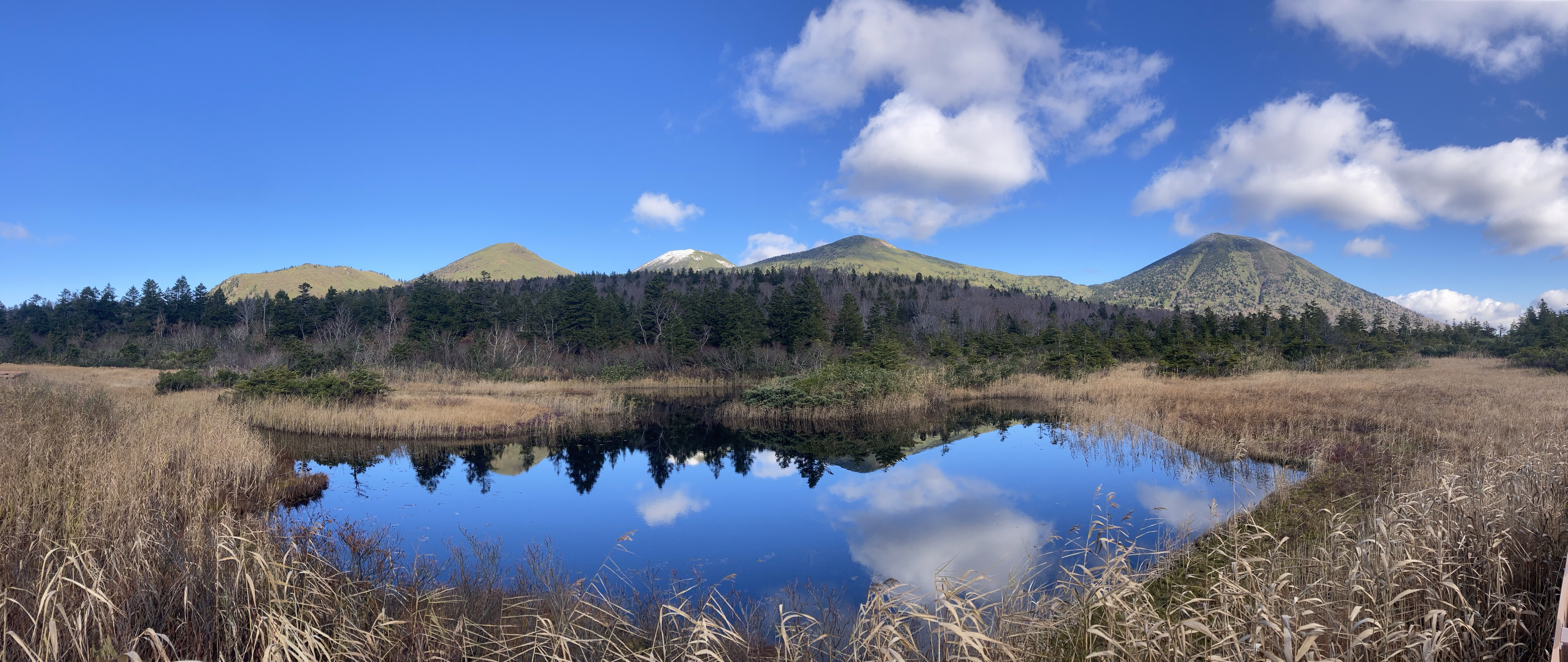
Suiren Pond and the northern Hakkōda Mountains during autumn.

The Hakkōda Mountains are famous for their high-altitude wetlands:

- Sennin Wetland (仙人岱)
- Kenashi Wetlands (毛無岱)
- Tamo Wetland (田茂萢)
- Suiren Pond (睡蓮沼)
- Tashiro Plateau Wetland (田代平湿原)

== Geology ==
Fumarole activity near Jigokunuma.

The Hakkōda Mountains are two clusters of stratovolcanoes in the Northeastern Japan Arc that consists of lava flows, debris flows, and pyroclastic ejecta and flows arranged into southern and northern groups. The volcanic peaks are made of non-alkali mafic rock; mostly andesite, dacite, and basalt. Although both groups of mountains formed in the Pleistocene, the southern group is older than the northern group. The southern group is made from rock that is 700,000 to 1,700,000 years old, while the northern group is made from rock that is 13,000 to 700,000 years old along the southwestern rim of an older caldera.

Eight eruptive events have occurred in the Northern Hakkōda Volcanic Group since 4,000 BCE, including phreatic and vulcanian eruptions. Four eruptive events occurred at the summit of Ōdake, with another possible eruption at Ōdake. The three most recent eruptions occurred at Jigokunuma on the southwestern foot of Ōdake near Sukayu Onsen during the 13th to 17th centuries.

=== Modern activity and the current threat ===
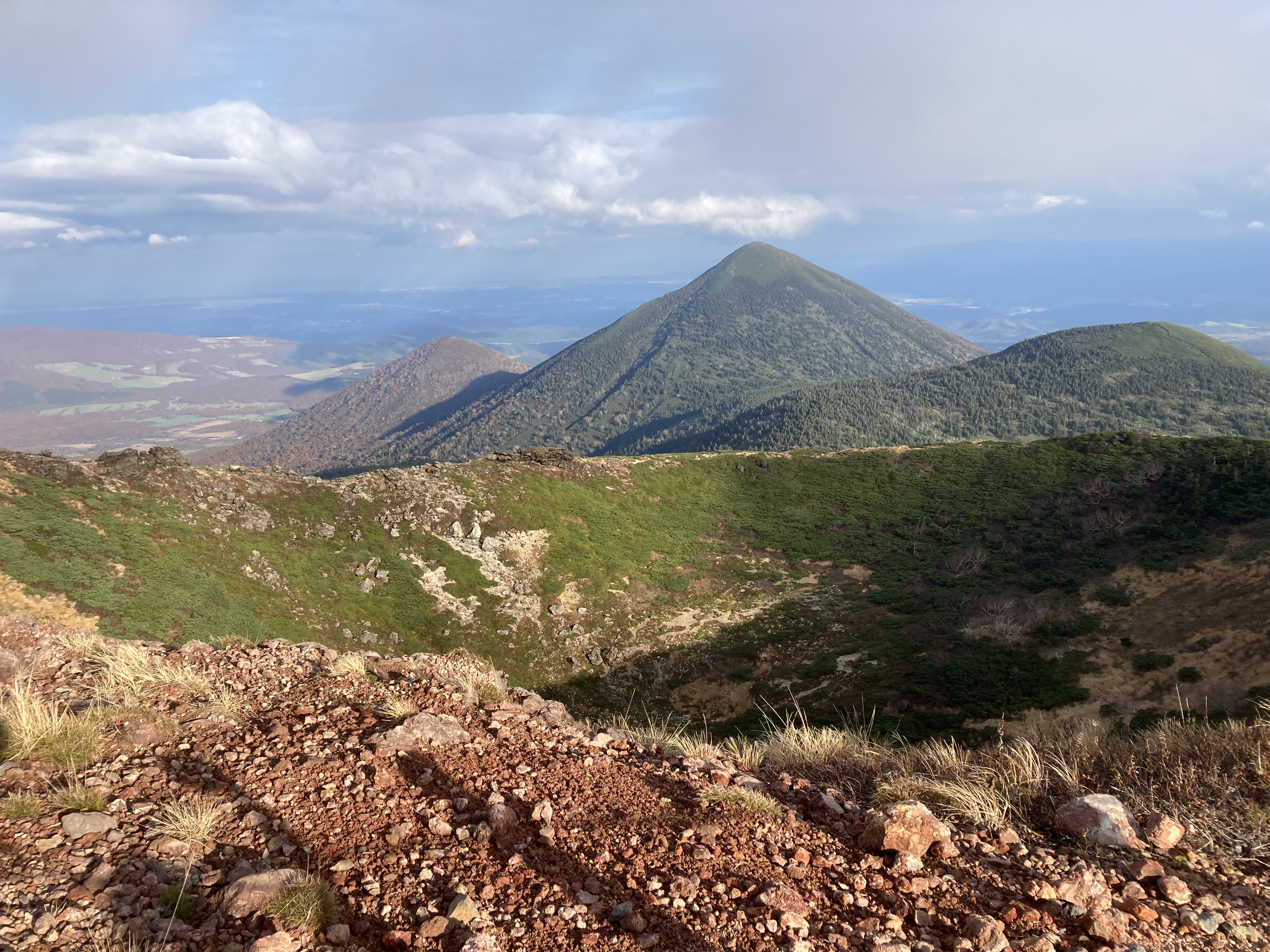
The summit crater of Mount Ōdake with Mount Kodake in the distance

Two fatal incidents have happened in modern history due to volcanic gas emitted from the northern group. On 12 July 1997, three soldiers of the Japan Self-Defense Forces died after gas accumulated in the valley where they were training. On 20 June 2010, a teenage girl died after being exposed to volcanic gas near Sukayu Onsen. After the 2011 Great East Japan earthquake, seismic activity around the volcanic group increased. After a series of earthquakes between February and October 2013, Mount Ōdake saw a degree of deformation.

Future eruptions are forecast to come from the peak of Mount Ōdake and Jigokunuma, a volcanic crater lake. Large scale eruptions from Mount Ōdake have the potential to send lahars (volcanic mudflows) to heavily populated areas of the cities of Aomori and Towada, to the northwest and east, respectively, of the volcanic complex. Potential lahars would flow to Towada by the Oirase River and its tributaries and to Aomori by the Tsutsumi and Komagome rivers. The junction of the Tsutsumi and Komagome rivers just north of Tsutsui Station on the Aoimori Railway Line would be the most heavily impacted populated area during a large eruption, with many areas struck by over a meter of debris. An eruption from Mount Ōdake could also produce pyroclastic flows that could travel up to 3.7 kilometers (2.3 mi) and expel lava up to 3.0 kilometers (1.9 mi) from the volcano. Due to volcanic deformation, the summit of Mount Takada-Ōdake shifted 115 meters (377 ft) to the west and increased in elevation by 7 meters (23 ft), shifting its summit from the border of Aomori and Towada to being entirely in the city of Towada. As of May 2020, intense fumarole activity was ongoing at Jigokunuma near Sukayu Onsen and National Routes 103 / 394.

== Human history ==
During the Jōmon period, human activity rapidly increased in the Hakkōda Mountains after a large-scale, Plinian eruption of the Lake Towada volcanic caldera. It is hypothesized that the removal of the mountains' beech forest in the eruption made room for the chestnut groves that the Jōmon people in the area relied heavily on.

In 1684, during the Edo period, Sukayu Onsen was founded at a hot spring near Jigokunuma. A hunter tracking a deer he had wounded came upon the deer near a hot spring. The hunter noticed that the deer had apparently been healed of its injuries by the hot spring. The location became known as Shikayu Onsen, literally "the deer's hot spring". As the amount of visitors grew, the onsen became known as Sukayu. The onsen is still a major attraction in the mountains.

In 1929, Tohoku University established the Mount Hakkōda Plant Experimentation Laboratory near Sukayu Onsen. The mountains, along with the Lake Towada area, were set aside under the National Park Law as a protected part of Towada National Park in 1936. On 3 August 1953, the national park was expanded, extending its protected status to the Tashiro Plateau Wetland in the caldera of the Northern Group of the Hakkōda Mountains.

After the park was established, the mountains were listed collectively as one of the 100 Famous Japanese Mountains compiled by the mountaineer Kyūya Fukada in 1964. This list gained popularity after it gained the attention of Emperor Naruhito, who would attempt to summit every entry on the list. The Hakkōda Ropeway was opened in October 1968, providing aerial lift access to the top of Mount Tamoyachidake, one of the peaks in the northern Hakkōda Mountains. The Hakkōda Mountains have appeared on a postage stamp released on 20 July 1951 and, more recently, in a set of stamps released on 30 March 2015. Shikō Munakata, an internationally acclaimed local sōsaku-hanga artist, designed a badge for the climbers of Hakkōda in 1954. A 6,409.7-hectare (15,839-acre) portion of the mountains' forests was designated as a Biotic Community Protection Forest in 1989.

== Outdoor recreation ==
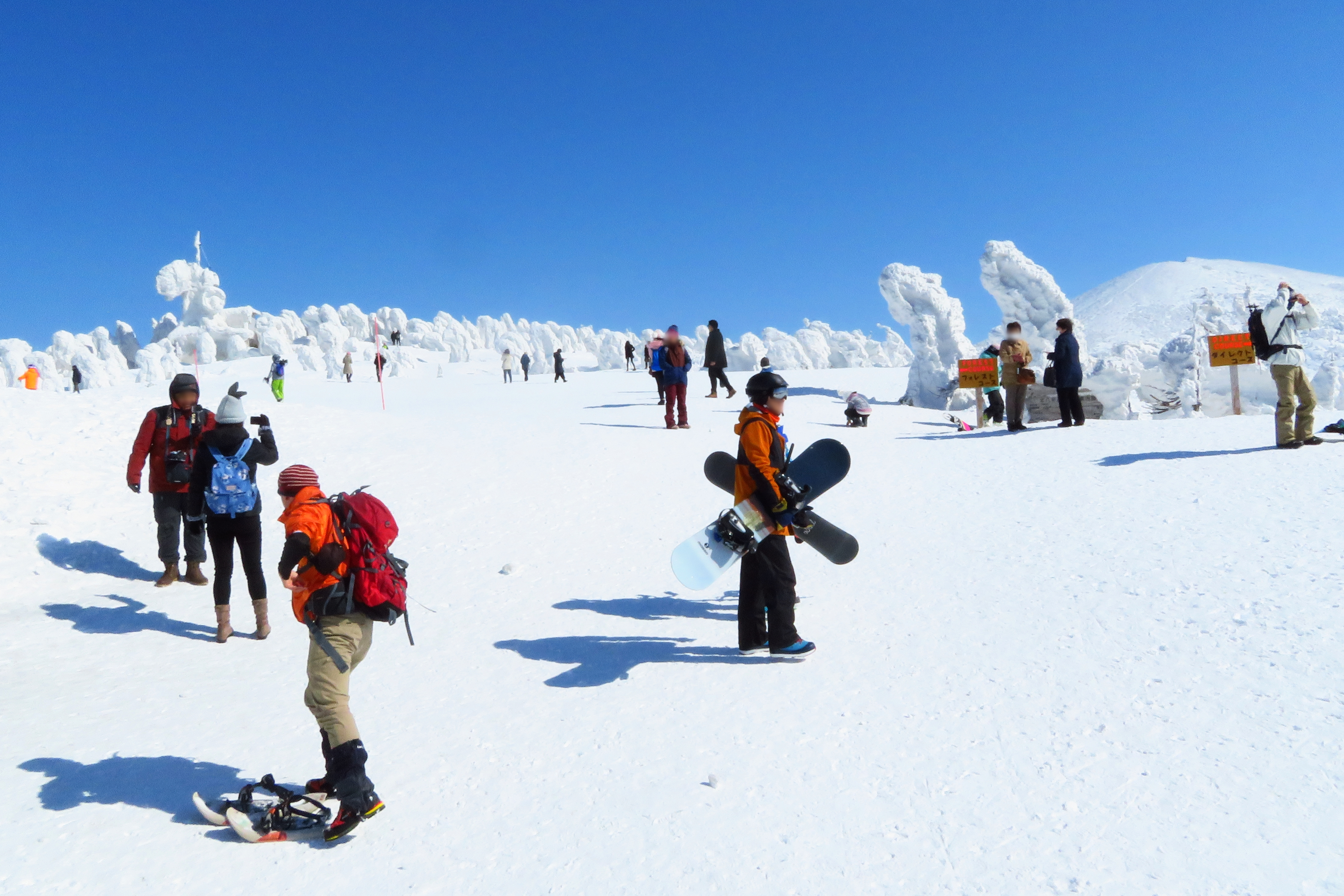
Visitors to Hakkōda's backcountry

The Hakkōda Mountains, particularly the area around the Hakkōda Ropeway, Sukayu Onsen, and Mount Ōdake, are a popular destination for skiers and snowboarders from around the world. The mountains offer an extensive area for backcountry winter and early spring recreation, with dry, powdery snow similar to what is seen at resorts in Hokkaido despite being slightly further south. Multiple ski resorts serve tourists near the bottom of the aerial lift and within close proximity of Sukayu Onsen. Jōgakura Bridge, spanning the northern and southern groups of the mountains, is a draw for tourists because of the panoramic views it offers of the mountains and their surroundings.

=== Climbing ===
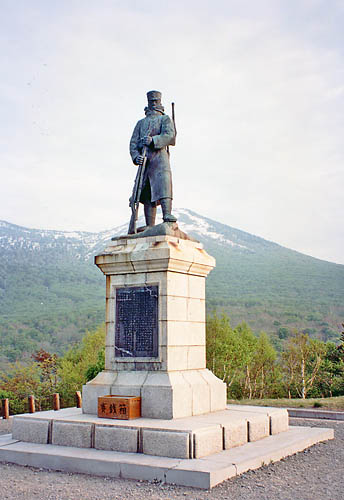
Memorial statue of the Hakkoda Death March, portraying Fusanosuke Gotō.

Climbing to the summit of Mount Ōdake, the highest peak of the Hakkōda Mountains, is not difficult and does not require any technical skill between May and November. To reach the peak climbers start their ascent at Sukayu Onsen or the top of the Hakkōda Ropeway, both of which can be accessed by public buses or private automobiles from National Route 103 and National Route 394. From Sukayu Onsen, it takes about two hours to complete the 694 meters (2,277 ft) ascent to the summit that is accessible by a well-marked pathway. From the top of the Hakkōda Ropeway it takes two hours to ascend to the summit and another two to descend back to the aerial lift. The summit can be reached outside of the mentioned climbing season; however dangers imposed by avalanches and harsh weather make advance training, personal radio beacons, and preparation necessary.

==== Dangers and accidents ====
The Hakkōda Mountains disaster occurred on 23 January 1902, when a group of Imperial Japanese Army soldiers marched in a blizzard on the Hakkōda Mountains en route to Tashiro Hot Spring located in the Hakkōda Mountains. The 199 deaths during a single ascent make it the world's largest mountaineering disaster in the modern history of mountain climbing.

Two people were killed and 12 were injured after an avalanche struck a hiking party in 2007. A woman who was snowboarding in a backcountry skiing area 400 meters (1,300 ft) away from the Hakkōda Ropeway was killed as a result of another avalanche on 21 February 2021. Depressions in the mountains can trap toxic volcanic gases emitted from vents. These gases have led to the deaths of several people in modern history.

== Ecology ==
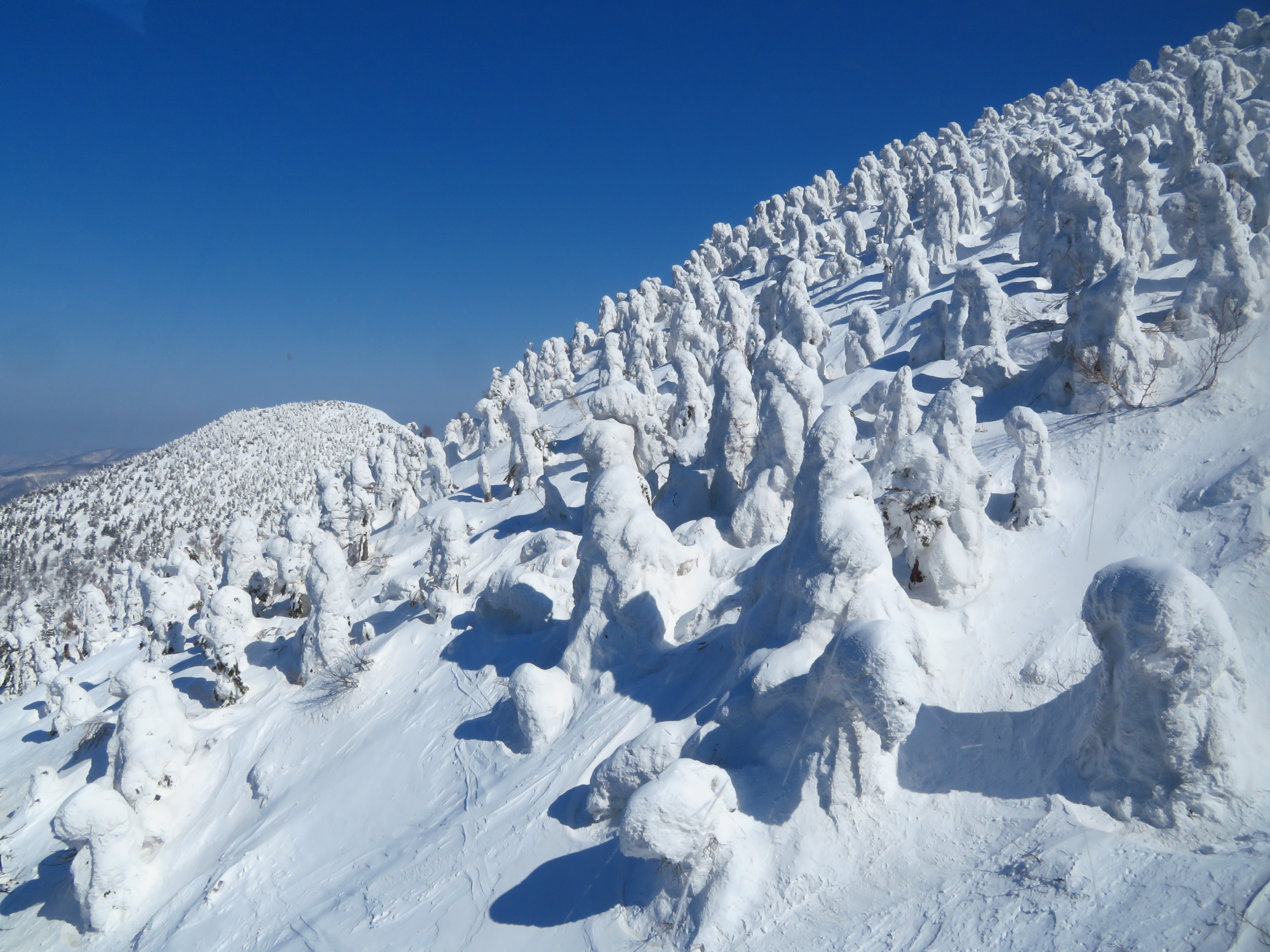
"Snow monsters" near Hakkōda's peaks

6,409.7 hectares (15,839 acres) of the land area within the Hakkōda Mountains is designated as a Protected Forest. Located primarily to the south of Mount Ōdake, it stretches about half the distance from that peak across the southern Hakkōda Mountains to Lake Towada. It is protected as a Biotic Community Protection Forest due to the variety of forests contained within the relatively compact area of the mountains.

Below the alpine zone that begins around 1,000 meters (3,300 ft), the Hakkōda Mountains are covered with Siebold's beech forests. In the lower alpine zone the mountains contain stands of Maries' fir, a species of fir known locally as Aomori todomatsu. During the winter these fir trees get blasted with snow, sculpting the precipitation onto the trees resulting in the phenomenon known as "snow monsters". In the higher alpine zone in elevations above 1,400 meters (4,600 ft), the stands of fir thin out and are interspersed with a mixture of alpine shrubs, primarily made up of East Asian alder and Japanese rowan. Hare's-tail cottongrass, evergreen azaleas, and Narthecium asiaticum are flowering plants that can be found in the wetlands of the mountains. In the subalpine moorlands, especially in areas with less snow, drier soil, and closer proximity to habitat edges, woody plant encroachment reduces plant variety.

The mountains support a wide variety of animal life. The Tsuta Wild Bird Sanctuary lies within the Southern Group of the Hakkōda Mountains. Its marshes and ponds support populations of Mandarin duck, forest green tree frog, and ruddy kingfisher. Other species that can be found in the Hakkōda Mountains are the golden eagle, the Japanese serow, and the Asian black bear.

== See also ==
- Hakkōda Tunnel
- Jōgakura Bridge
- Mount Hakkoda (1977 film)
- Mt. Hakkoda (2014 film)
- List of volcanoes in Japan
- List of mountains in Japan
