= Hakkōda Ropeway =

Japanese aerial lift line

Coordinates: 40°40′41.4″N 140°50′47.3″E

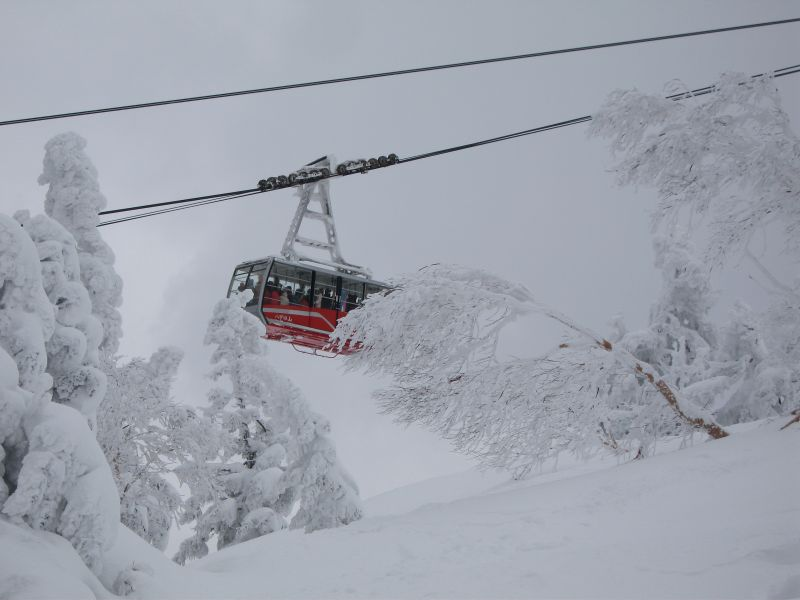
Hakkōda Ropeway in winter.

The Hakkōda Ropeway (八甲田ロープウェー, Hakkōda Rōpuwē) is the name of a Japanese aerial lift line, as well as its operator. Opened in 1968, the line climbs Mount Tamoyachi in the Hakkōda Mountains in Aomori, Aomori. It transports skiers and rime spectators in winter, and hikers in other seasons.

== Basic data ==
- System: Aerial tramway, 2 track cables and 2 haulage ropes
- Distance: 2.4 kilometres (1.5 mi)
- Vertical interval: 650 m (2,133 ft)
- Maximum gradient: 25°43′
- Operational speed: 5 m/s
- Passenger capacity per a cabin: 101
- Stations: 2

== See also ==
- List of aerial lifts in Japan
