= Mount Iwaki =

Stratovolcano in Aomori Prefecture, Japan

- Tsugaru Fuji; Okufuji
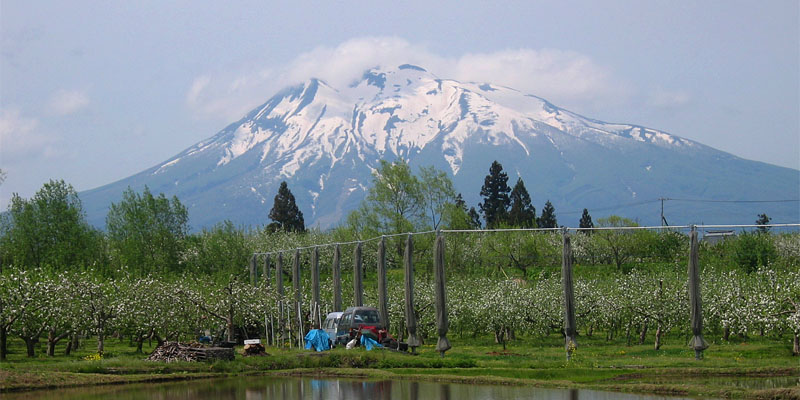
- From the north, with apple orchards in Hirosaki in the foreground

Highest point
- Elevation: 1,624.6 m (5,330 ft)
- Prominence: 1,362.0 m (4,468.5 ft)
- Listing: List of mountains and hills of Japan by height List of volcanoes in Japan; 100 Famous Japanese Mountains; Ribu
- Coordinates: 40°39′12″N 140°18′24″E

Naming
- Native name: 岩木山 (Japanese); Iwaki-san (Japanese)

Geography
- Location within Aomori Prefecture
- Location: Aomori Prefecture, Japan
- Country: Japan
- Prefecture: Aomori Prefecture
- Region: Tōhoku
- Parent range: Ōu Mountains

Geology
- Mountain type: Stratovolcano
- Rock type: Andesite
- Volcanic arc: Northeastern Japan Arc
- Last eruption: March 1863

Mount Iwaki (岩木山, Iwaki-san) is a stratovolcano located in western Aomori Prefecture, Tohoku, Japan. It is also referred to as Tsugaru Fuji (津軽富士) and less frequently, Okufuji (奥富士) due to its similar shape to Mount Fuji. With a summit elevation of 1,625 meters (5,331 ft) and a prominence of 1,362 meters (4,469 ft) it is the highest mountain in Aomori Prefecture.

Mount Iwaki is listed as one of the 100 Famous Japanese Mountains in a 1964 book by mountaineer and author Kyūya Fukada. The mountain and its surroundings are located within the borders of Tsugaru Quasi-National Park.

== Name ==
There are various theories about the origin of the name "Iwaki". Two hold that its name is Ainu in origin, the first is that it comes from Ainu: カムィ イワキ, romanized: Kamuyiwaki (god's home), the other is that it is a distortion of the Ainu word for rock, Ainu: イワーケ, romanized: Iwaake. Yet another theory is that the name Iwaki is an archaic way of saying "stone castle" 石の城 (ishi no shiro).

In addition to being called Mount Iwaki, the mountain is also widely nicknamed "Tsugaru Fuji" (津軽富士), and less frequently "Okufuji" (奥富士, Northern Fuji), due its conical shape that bears similarity to Mount Fuji. It was also dubbed "Peak Tilesius" in honor of German naturalist, Wilhelm Gottlieb Tilesius von Tilenau in 1805 by Adam Johann von Krusenstern during the first Russian circumnavigation of the Earth, though this name had dropped out of use among Westerners by 1858 in favor of its native name.

== Geographic setting and description ==
With a summit elevation of 1,625 meters (5,331 ft), Mount Iwaki has the highest peak in Aomori Prefecture and rises 1,322 meters (4,337 ft) above the plains at its base. The peak is 18.2 kilometers (11.3 mi) south-southwest of central Tsugaru; however, the mountain is located largely within the city of Hirosaki, but the northwestern slopes of it are part of the town of Ajigasawa. The peak is 14.8 kilometers (9.2 mi) west-northwest of central Hirosaki.

== Geology ==
Mount Iwaki is a roughly symmetrical andesitic stratovolcano, rising in relative isolation from the plains at the base of Tsugaru Peninsula. Its summit crater is two kilometers wide, and it has three lava domes on the western and southern flanks. The mountain has been active frequently in historic times, with very frequent activity consisting mostly of small to moderate phreatic explosions during the Edo period. The volcano's last known eruption was on 23 March 1863. Hirosaki University has maintained an observatory with 18 telemetering stations on the mountain since 1981.

== Outdoor recreation ==
=== Climbing ===
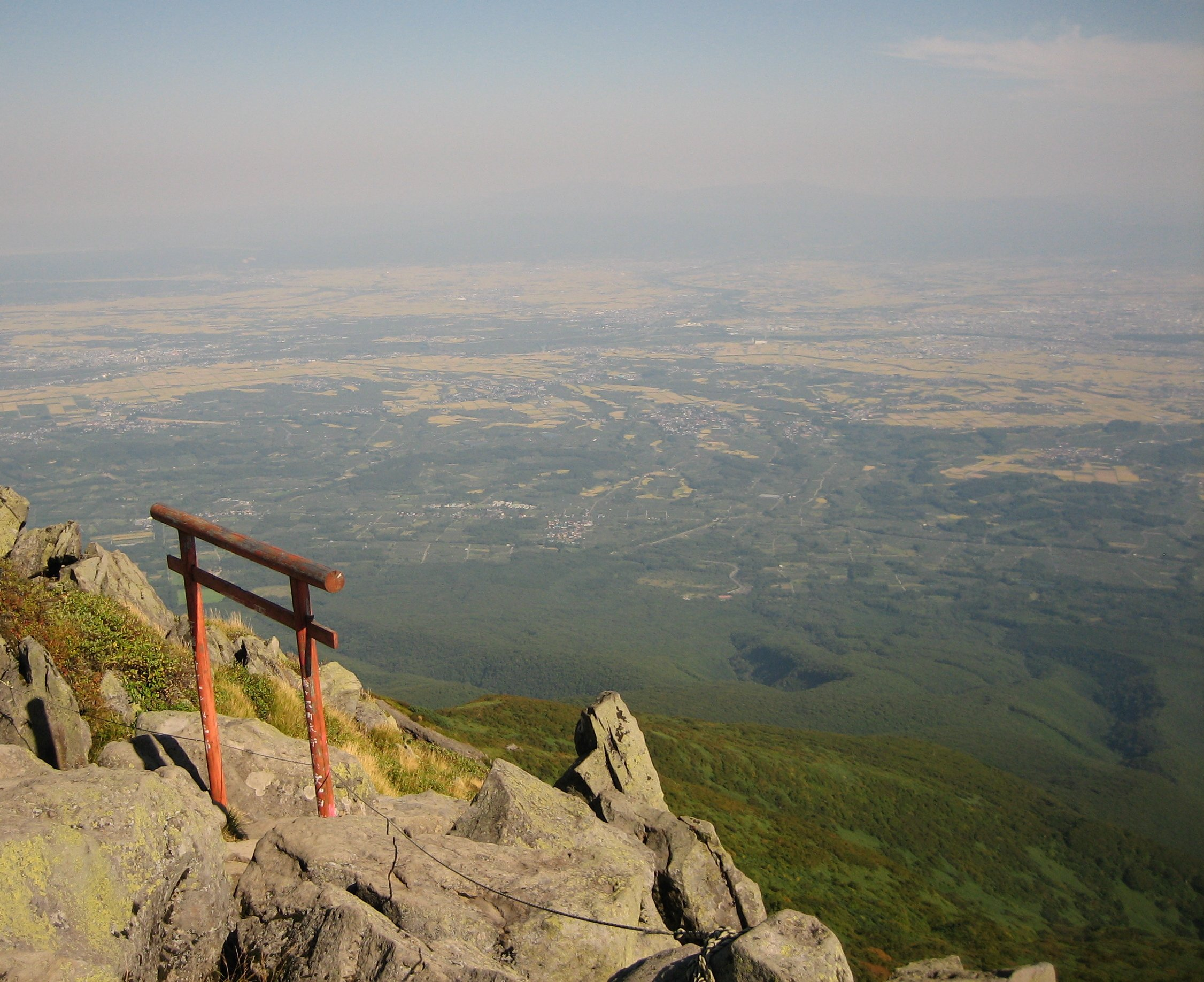
View from the summit of Mount Iwaki

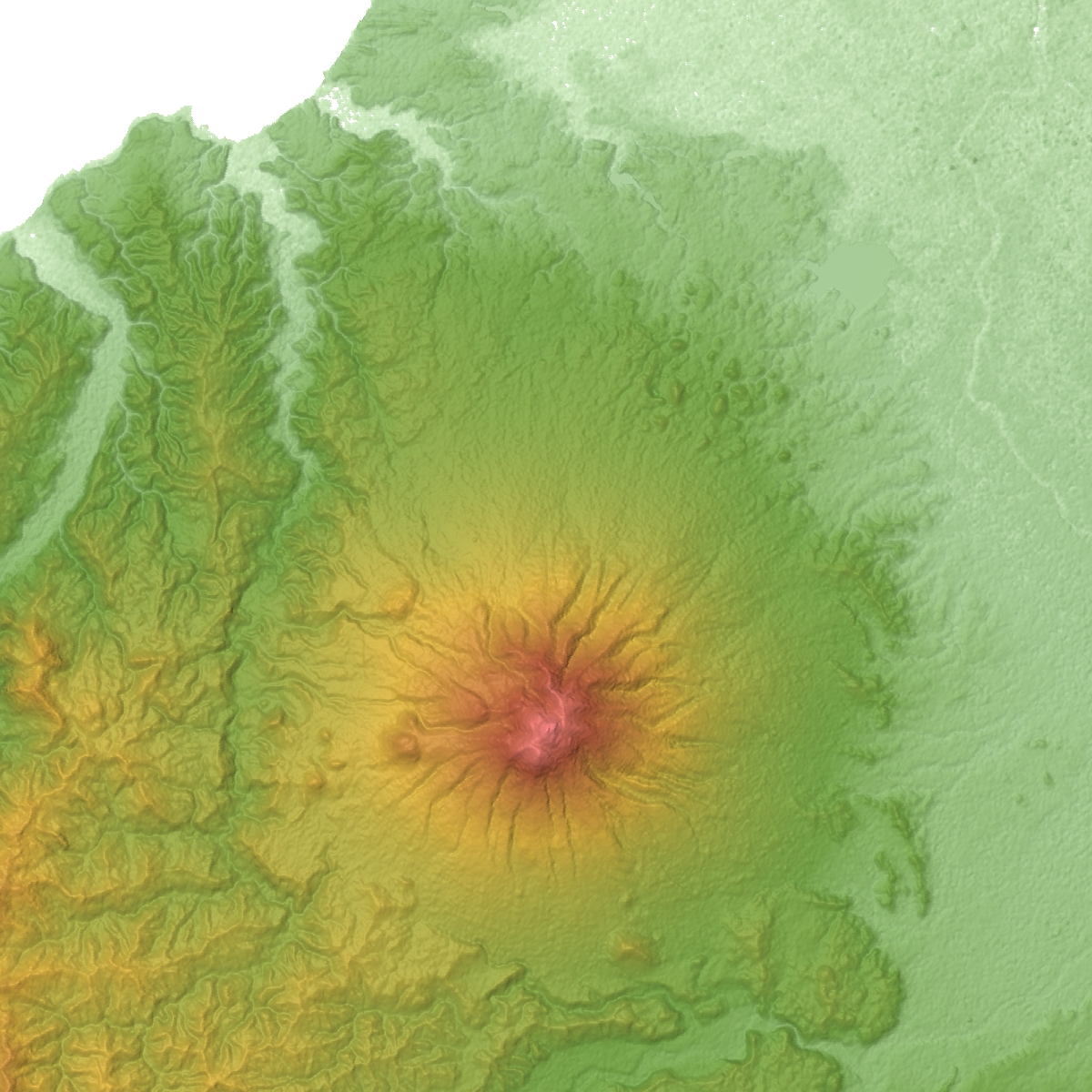
Relief Map

Mount Iwaki's summit, at 1625 meters, can be reached only by hiking, but the length and duration of the hike depends on the route. From Iwakiyama Shrine (岩木山神社), it takes approximately four hours to hike to the top. The trail starts from inside the shrine, before the large gates on the left. The easier and more popular route follows Tsugaru Iwaki Skyline, a tolled road, up to a lift. The skyline road starts from Aomori Prefecture Route 3 on the southwest side of Mount Iwaki. At the end of the road there is a chair lift. From the top of the chair lift it takes around 30–40 minutes to hike to the mountain's summit.

== See also ==
- Iwakiyama Jinja
- Tsugaru Quasi-National Park
- Shirakami-Sanchi
- List of volcanoes in Japan
- List of mountains in Japan
