= Hakkōda Mountains disaster =

1902 mountaineering disaster in Japan

Coordinates: 40°42′24″N 140°52′22″E

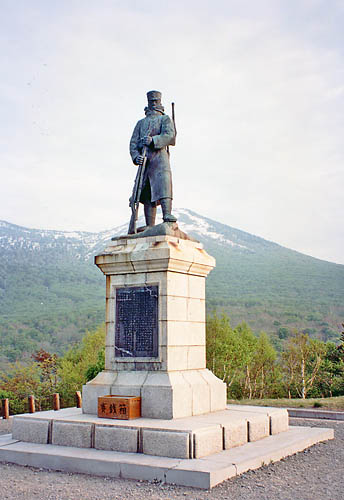
Memorial statue of the Hakkōda Death March, portraying Corporal Fusanosuke Gotō.

The Hakkōda Mountains disaster (Japanese: 八甲田雪中行軍遭難事件, Hepburn: Hakkōda Settchū Kōgun Sōnan Jiken) occurred on 23 January 1902, when 210 Imperial Japanese Army soldiers became lost in a blizzard in the Hakkōda Mountains in Aomori Prefecture in northern Honshu, Japan, en-route to Tashiro Hot Spring in the Hakkōda Mountains. The 199 deaths (193 during the incident, 6 in the two months after rescue) during a single ascent make it the most lethal disaster in the modern recorded mountaineering.

== Background ==
In the prelude to the Russo-Japanese War, the Imperial Japanese Army deemed it necessary to secure a route through the Hakkōda Mountains in the event that roads and railways were destroyed by shelling of the Aomori coastline by the Imperial Russian Navy during wintertime. Training in movement during winter conditions was also deemed necessary in light of a potential war with Russia, so a wintertime crossing of the Hakkōda Mountains was planned.

The IJA's 8th Division's Fifth Infantry Regiment was stationed in the city of Aomori. The western side of the Ōu Mountains has heavy monsoons and little sunshine which leads to heavy snowfall. The 210-man unit that made the march into the Hakkōda Mountains in the snow was selected from the 3,000-man Fifth Infantry Regiment, but consisted of many men who originated from a region with little snow and lacked experience in climbing snowy mountains. The unit also did not use local guides.

== Incident ==
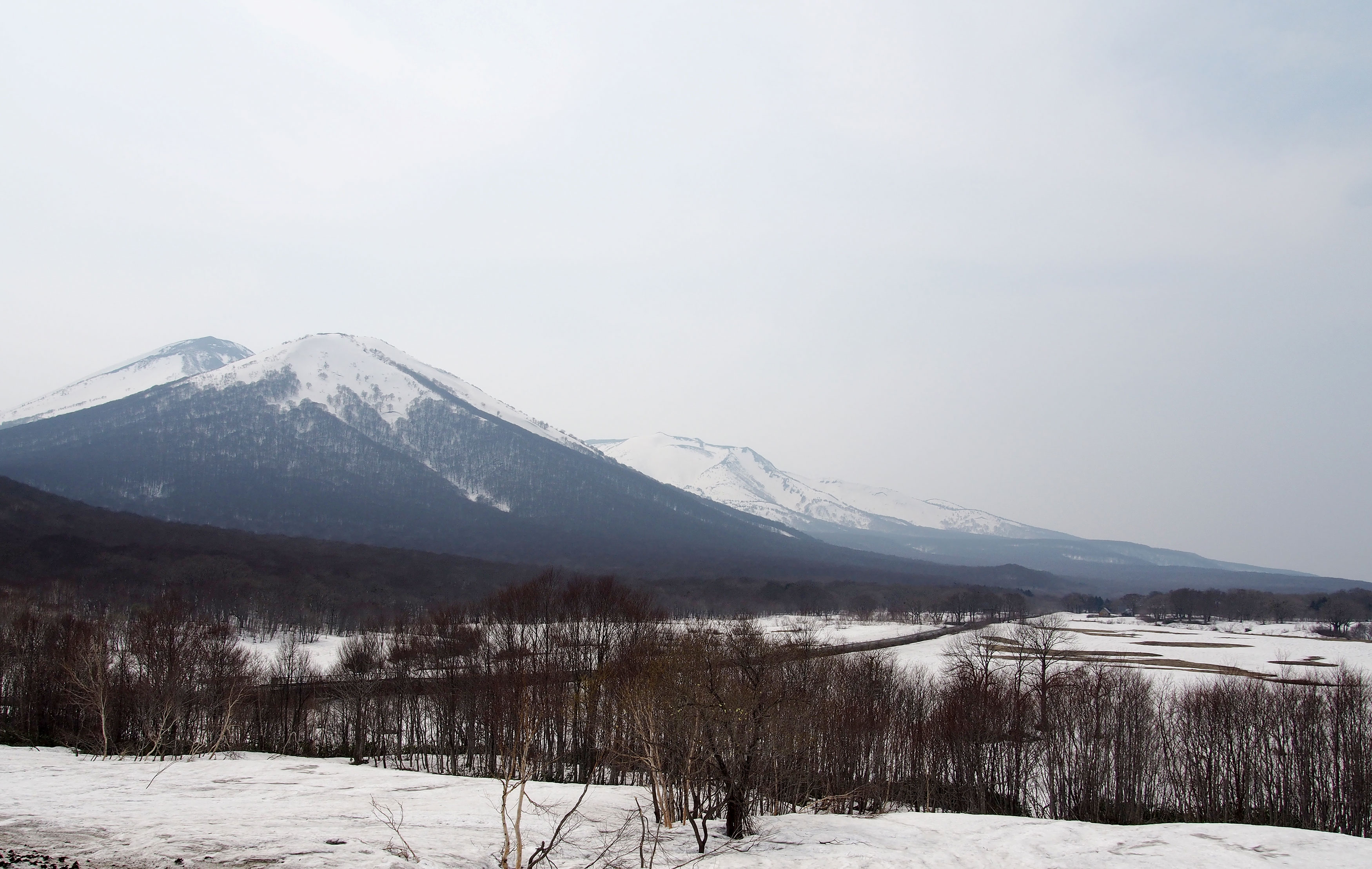
Southeastern side of the Hakkōda Mountains

The troops, slowed by their heavy supply sleds, set out from Aomori at 6:55 a.m. on 23 January 1902. Their objective was Tashiro Hot Spring located 20 kilometers (12 mi) away in the Hakkōda Mountains. At 4 p.m. on 23 January, the unit reached the summit of Umatateba (732 meters (2,402 ft)), which was only four kilometers from the Tashiro Hot Spring. On day three, 25 January 1902, the weather changed suddenly: a temperature of −41 °C (−42 °F) was observed—the lowest in Japanese weather observation history—and there was an enormous low-pressure system above the Hakkōda Mountains. In the deep snow and blizzard, the soldiers wandered the northeast slope of the mountains for several days.

The unit missed the expected return date on 24 January, but the regimental HQ at Aomori remained optimistic until 26 January, when a 60-man rescue party to track and find the missing men was dispatched. On 27 January, the fifth day since their departure, Corporal Fusanosuke Gotō, standing buried in the snow, became the first survivor discovered by the rescue party. The details of the disaster which struck the unit marching through the Hakkōda Mountains were established based on Corporal Gotō's testimony. The 5th Regiment and the 8th Division were finally placed on full-alert and launched major search-and-rescue/recover operations, which lasted for months and involved tens of thousands of soldiers and villagers. The last survivor was found on 2 February and the last body was recovered on 28 May.

In total, 193 of the 210 men froze to death en route. A further six died within two months after rescue. Eight out of 11 survivors had to have limbs amputated due to frostbite, including Gotō.

== Legacy ==
Journalist Koshu Ogasawara spent years covering the Hakkōda disaster. In 1971, after receiving numerous documents from Ogasawara, novelist Jirō Nitta published Death March on Mount Hakkōda (八甲田山死の彷徨, Hakkōdasan shi no hōkō), a semi-fictional account of the disaster. James Westerhoven translated the book into English. The screenwriter Shinobu Hashimoto, adapted the novel and produced the 1977 movie Mount Hakkoda (八甲田山). Both the novel and the film are partly fictionalized, and there are discrepancies with the facts.

In 1978, a Hakkōda Disaster museum opened next to the army cemetery in Aomori.

Mt. Hakkoda: the world's worst mountaineering disaster (八甲田山 世界最大の山岳遭難事故), a film based on historical facts, was released in 2014.

== See also ==
- List of mountaineering disasters by death toll
- Tragedy of Antuco
