= Komagome River =

Komagome River 駒込川
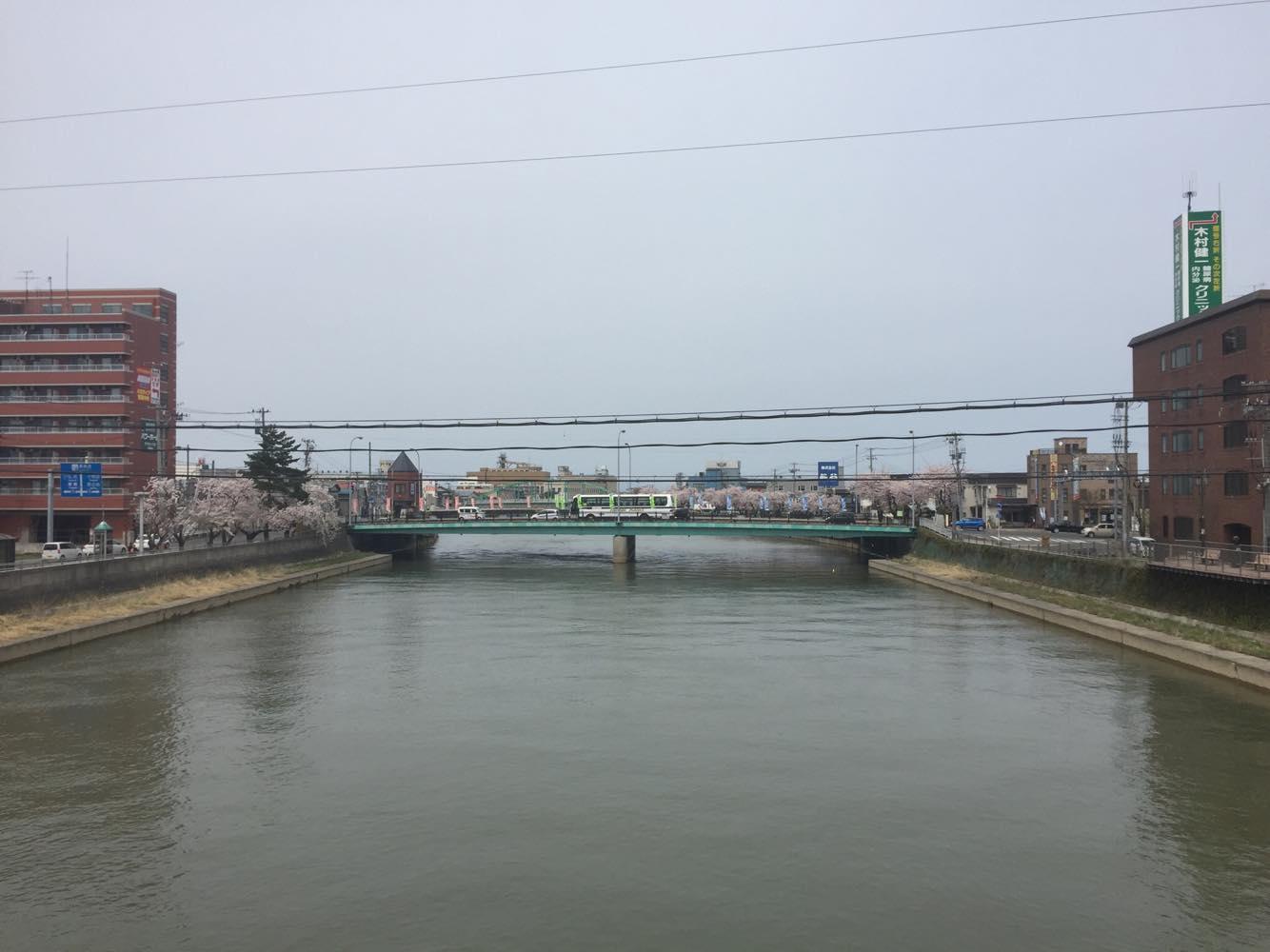
- The Komagome River in Tsutsumimachi, Aomori crossing under National Route 4.

- Location within Japan

Location
- Country: Japan
- State: Honshu
- Region: Tōhoku
- Municipality: Aomori, Aomori

Physical characteristics
- Source: Hakkōda Mountains
  - coordinates: 40°39′17″N 140°55′25″E
  - elevation: 1,585 m (5,200 ft)
- Mouth: Aomori Bay (at Aomori
  - coordinates: 40°50′05″N 140°45′45″E
- Length: 32.3 km (20.1 mi)
- Basin size: 107 km^{2} (41 sq mi)

Basin features
- Tributaries
  - left: Tsutsumigawa, Arakawa

Komagome River (Japanese: 駒込川(こまごめがわ), Hepburn: komagomegawa) is a river in Aomori Prefecture, Japan. It begins in the northern Hakkōda Mountains and flows into Aomori Bay at Aomori. It has a length of 32.3 kilometers (20.1 mi) and is designated as a Class B river.
