= Fusanosuke Gotō =

Japanese soldier (1879–1924)

- 後藤 房之助
- Born: 14 November 1879; Kurihara, Miyagi, Japan
- Died: 31 July 1924 (aged 44); Kurihara, Miyagi, Japan
- Military career
- Allegiance: Empire of Japan
- Branch: Imperial Japanese Army
- Service years: 1899–1902
- Rank: Corporal

Memorial Statue of the Hakkōda Death March

Fusanosuke Gotō (後藤 房之助, Gotō Fusanosuke; 15 November 1879 – 30 July 1924) was a soldier in the Imperial Japanese Army, memorialized by the Memorial Statue of the Hakkōda Death March in Aomori, Japan.

In January 1902, 210 soldiers in the 5th Infantry Regiment, 2nd Battalion became trapped on the Hakkōda Mountains; this was the start of the Hakkōda Mountains disaster. Search parties discovered Gotō. The discovery led to the rescue of the other soldiers. His arms and legs were amputated as a result of frostbite.

After the incident, he retired from the army, returned to his hometown, became a member of the village assembly, and later died from a cerebral hemorrhage.

In Jirō Nitta's Death March on Mount Hakkōda: A Documentary Novel, a semi-fictional account of the disaster, Gotō is portrayed by the character Corporal Etō.
