= Kamikita, Aomori =

Kamikita 上北町
- Former municipality
- Flag Emblem

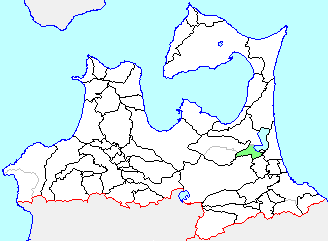
- Location of Kamikita in Aomori Prefecture

- Location in Japan
- Coordinates: 40.736°N 140.956°E
- Country: Japan
- Region: Tōhoku
- Prefecture: Aomori Prefecture
- District: Kamikita
- Merged: July 1, 2005 (now part of Tōhoku)

Area
  - Total: 119.48 km^{2} (46.13 sq mi)

Population (April 1, 2005)
  - Total: 9,830
  - Density: 82.27/km^{2} (213.1/sq mi)
- Time zone: UTC+09:00 (JST)
- Website: Tōhoku official website
- Symbols
- Flower: Violet
- Tree: Ginkgo

Kamikita (上北町, Kamikita-machi) was a town located in Kamikita District in central Aomori Prefecture, Japan.

On March 31, 2005, Kamikita was merged into the neighboring and expanded town of Tōhoku, and thus no longer exists as an independent municipality.

Kamikita Village was founded in 1889 through the merger of Ōura, Shingo and Shindate Villages. On September 1, 1958 it was elevated to town status.

Bordering the east shore of Lake Ogawara, the town had an agriculture-based economy based on production of rice, tobacco, carrots as well as lake fish, including smelt, icefish and shijimi.

At the time of its merger, the town had an estimated population of 9,830 and a population density of 82.27 persons per km^{2}. The total area was 119.48 km^{2}.

Kamikita was served by two train stations: Kamikitachō Station and Kogawara Station on the Tōhoku Main Line.
