= Kamikitachō Station =

Railway station in Tōhoku, Aomori Prefecture, Japan

Kamikitachō 上北町
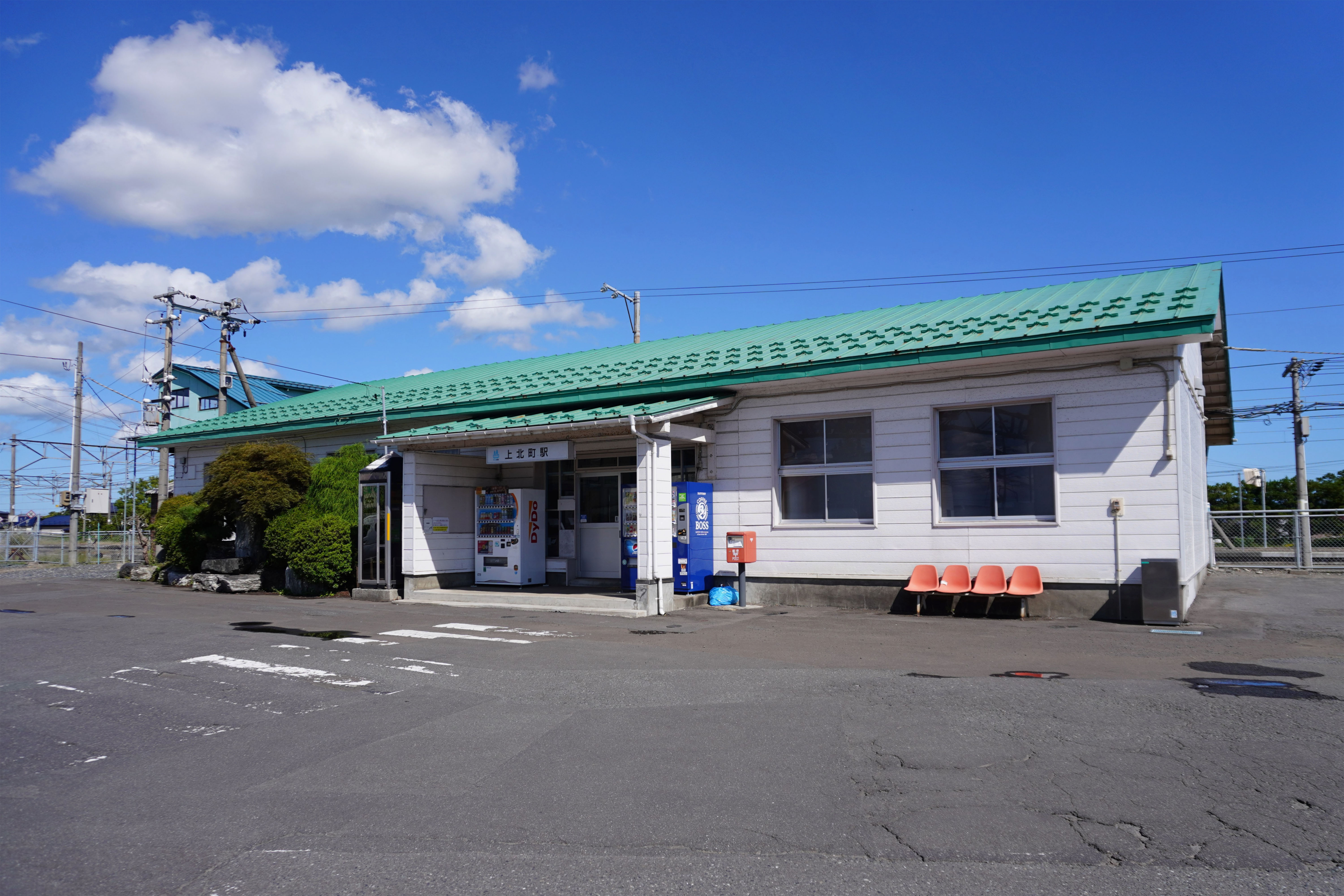
- Kamikitachō Station in September 2023

General information
- Location: 1-22-97 Kamikita Kita, Tōhoku, Kamikita District, Aomori Prefecture 039-2404; Japan
- Coordinates: 40°43′58.30″N 141°15′52.96″E
- System: Regional rail station
- Operator: Aoimori Railway
- Line: ■ Aoimori Railway Line
- Distance: 57.4 km from Aomori
- Platforms: 1 side + 1 island platform
- Connections: Bus

Construction
- Structure type: At grade

Other information
- Status: Staffed
- Website: Official website

History
- Opened: 1 September 1891
- Former names: Numazaki (until 1959)

Passengers
- 554 daily boardings (2018)

Services
Preceding station	Aoimori Railway	Following station
Misawa towards Hachinohe	Shimokita (limited service)	Ottomo towards Noheji
Kogawara towards Metoki	Aoimori Railway Line	Ottomo towards Aomori
Location
- Location within Aomori Prefecture Location within Japan

Kamikitachō Station (上北町駅, Kamikitachō-eki) is a railway station in the town of Tōhoku in Aomori Prefecture, Japan, operated by the third sector railway operator Aoimori Railway Company.

== Location ==
Kamikitachō Station is served by the Aoimori Railway Line, and is 57.4 kilometers from the terminus of the line at Aomori Station. It is 674.7 kilometers from Tokyo Station.

=== Surrounding area ===
- Lake Ogawara
- Kamikita Post Office

== Station layout ==
Kamikitachō Station has one side platform and one island platform serving three tracks, connected to a single-story station building by a footbridge. Only the outer tracks 1 and 3 are in regular operation. The station is staffed.

=== Platforms ===
1	■ Aoimori Railway Line	for Noheji and Aomori
2	■ Aoimori Railway Line	(siding)
3	■ Aoimori Railway Line	for Misawa and Hachinohe

== History ==
Kamikitachō Station was opened on 1 September 1891 as Numazaki Station (沼崎駅, Numazaki-eki) on the Nippon Railway. It became a station on the Tōhoku Main Line of the Japanese Government Railways (JGR), the pre-war predecessor to the Japan National Railway (JNR), on 1 July 1906. On 1 October 1959, the station was renamed to its present name. With the privatization of the JNR on 1 April 1987, it came under the operational control of East Japan Railway Company (JR East).

On 4 December 2010, the Tōhoku Shinkansen was successfully extended north to Shin-Aomori Station from Hachinohe. As a result of the opening of the bullet train between the two stations, that section of the Tōhoku Main Line including this station was transferred to the Aoimori Railway Company from JR East on the same day.

== Services ==
Kamikitachō Station is primarily served by trains operating on a local service on the Aoimori Railway Line between Aomori and Hachinohe. It is served by two rapid express trains, the Shimokita service operated jointly by JR East and the Aoimori Railway between Hachinohe and Ōminato and the 560M train operated jointly by the Aoimori Railway and the Iwate Galaxy Railway between Aomori and Morioka. Passenger trains serve Kamikitachō Station just over 17 hours a day from 6:12 am to 11:23 pm. In 2018, a daily average of 554 passengers boarded trains at Kamikitachō Station, an increase from the daily average of 213 passengers the station served in 2010, the final year of its ownership by JR East. In 2018, the station was the tenth busiest on the Aoimori Railway Line, excluding Aomori and Hachinohe stations, and the busiest along the rail line in the town of Tōhoku.

== See also ==
- List of railway stations in Japan
