= Hirosaki City Athletic Park Baseball Stadium =

Sports venue in Hirosaki, Japan

- Haruka Dream Baseball Stadium
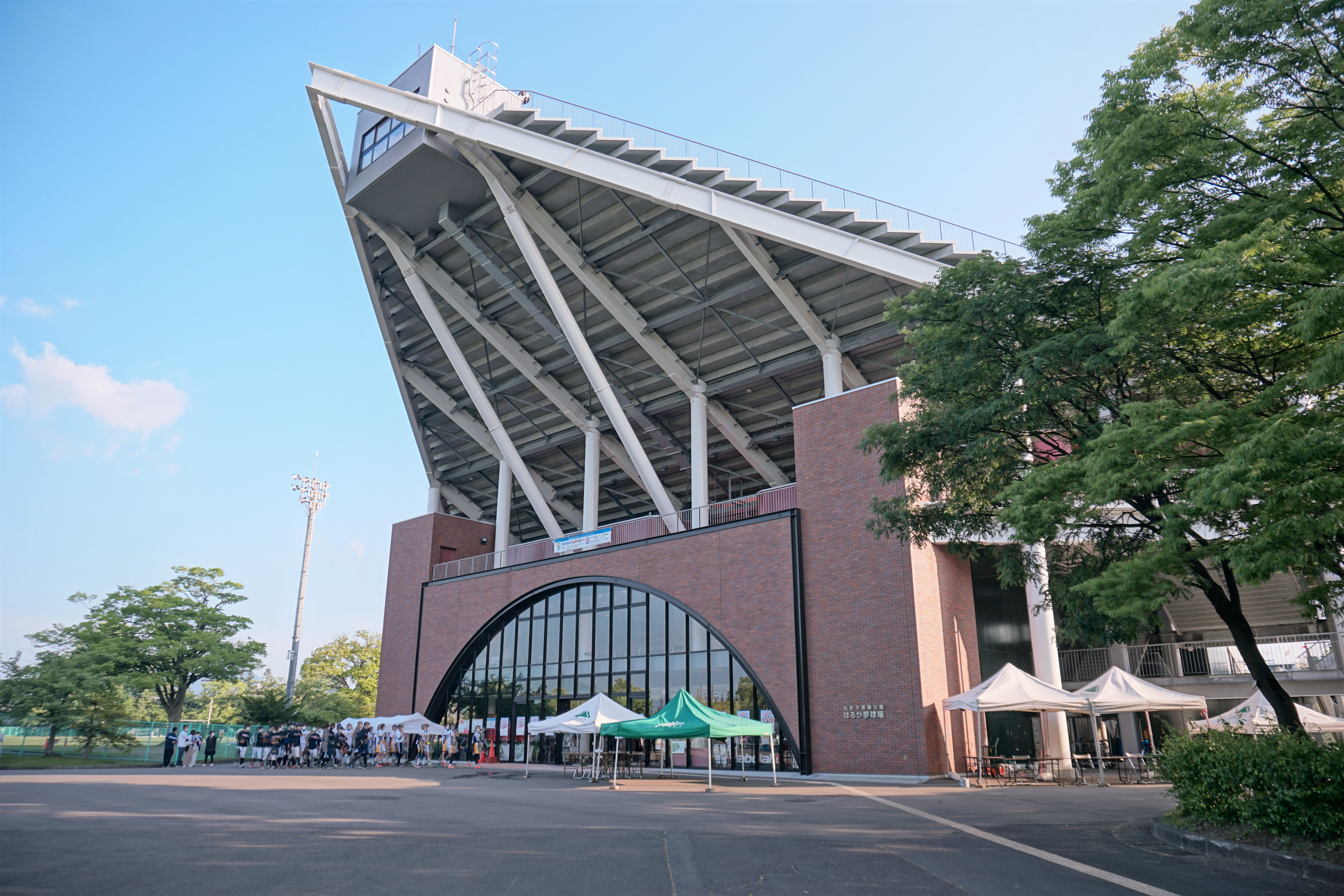
- Interactive map of Hirosaki City Athletic Park Baseball Stadium
- Address: Hirosaki, Aomori, Japan
- Coordinates: 40°35′27.4″N 140°30′07.1″E
- Owner: Hirosaki city
- Capacity: 15,050
- Surface: Artificial turf

Construction
- Opened: April 1, 1979

The Hirosaki City Athletic Park Baseball Stadium (弘前市運動公園野球場) is a baseball stadium located in the Hirosaki City Athletic Park in Tōhoku, Aomori, Japan. It is also known as the Haruka Dream Baseball Stadium. The facility is owned by Hirosaki City, and the Hirosaki City Amateur Sports Association carries out operational management as a designated manager.

== History ==
On April 1, 1979, it opened in the Hirosaki City Athletic Park as an alternative facility of the Hirosaki City Municipal Baseball Stadium. In 1979, 1982, and 1984, the NPB held its first official matches sponsored by the Hokkaido Nippon-Ham Fighters. In 2009, 2015, and 2016, the second official matches of the Eastern League sponsored by the local team Tohoku Rakuten Golden Eagles were held. It was refurbished in 2017.
