= Kogawara Station =

Railway station in Tōhoku, Aomori Prefecture, Japan

Kogawara Station 小川原駅
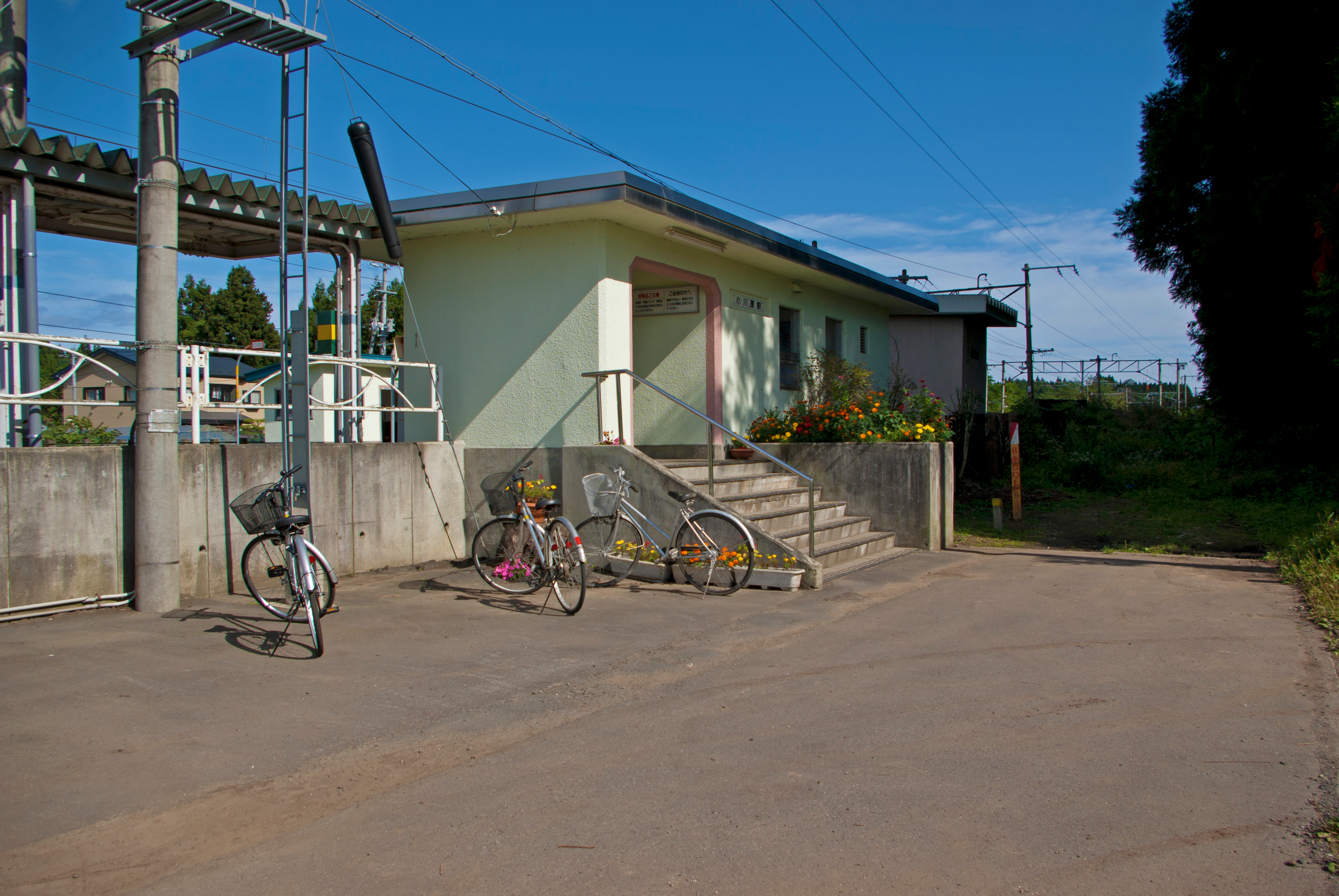
- Kogawara Stationing September 2009

General information
- Location: Oura, Tōhoku-machi, Kamikita-gun, Aomori-ken 039-2402; Japan
- Coordinates: 40°42′35.61″N 141°17′59.00″E
- System: Regional rail station
- Operator: Aoimori Railway
- Line: ■ Aoimori Railway Line
- Distance: 53.5 km from Aomori
- Platforms: 2 side platforms

Construction
- Structure type: At grade

Other information
- Status: Unstaffed
- Website: Official website

History
- Opened: June 10, 1953

Services
Preceding station	Aoimori Railway	Following station
Misawa towards Metoki	Aoimori Railway Line	Kamikitachō towards Aomori
Location
- Location within Aomori Prefecture Location within Japan

Kogawara Station (小川原駅, Kogawara-eki) is a railway station in the town of Tōhoku in Aomori Prefecture, Japan, operated by the third sector railway operator Aoimori Railway Company.

== Lines ==
Kogawara Station is served by the Aoimori Railway Line, and is 53.5 kilometers from the terminus of the line at Aomori Station. It is 670.8 kilometers from Tokyo Station.

== Station layout ==
Kogawara Station has two opposed side platforms serving two tracks connected by a footbridge. There is no station building, but only a small shelter on one of the platforms, and the platforms are not numbered. The station is unattended.

=== Platforms ===
station side	■ Aoimori Railway Line	for Noheji and Aomori
opp side	■ Aoimori Railway Line	for Misawa and Hachinohe

== History ==
Kogawara Station was opened on August 1, 1944 as Kogawara Signal Stop (小川原信号場, Kogawara shingōjō) on the Tōhoku Main Line. It was elevated to the status of a full station on June 10, 1953. The station has been unattended since August 1971. With the privatization of the Japan National Railways on April 1, 1987, it came under the operational control of East Japan Railway Company (JR East).

The section of the Tōhoku Main Line including this station was transferred to Aoimori Railway on December 4, 2010.

== Surrounding area ==
- Lake Ogawara
- Kogawara Post Office

== See also ==
- List of railway stations in Japan
