= Misawa, Aomori =

Misawa 三沢市
- City
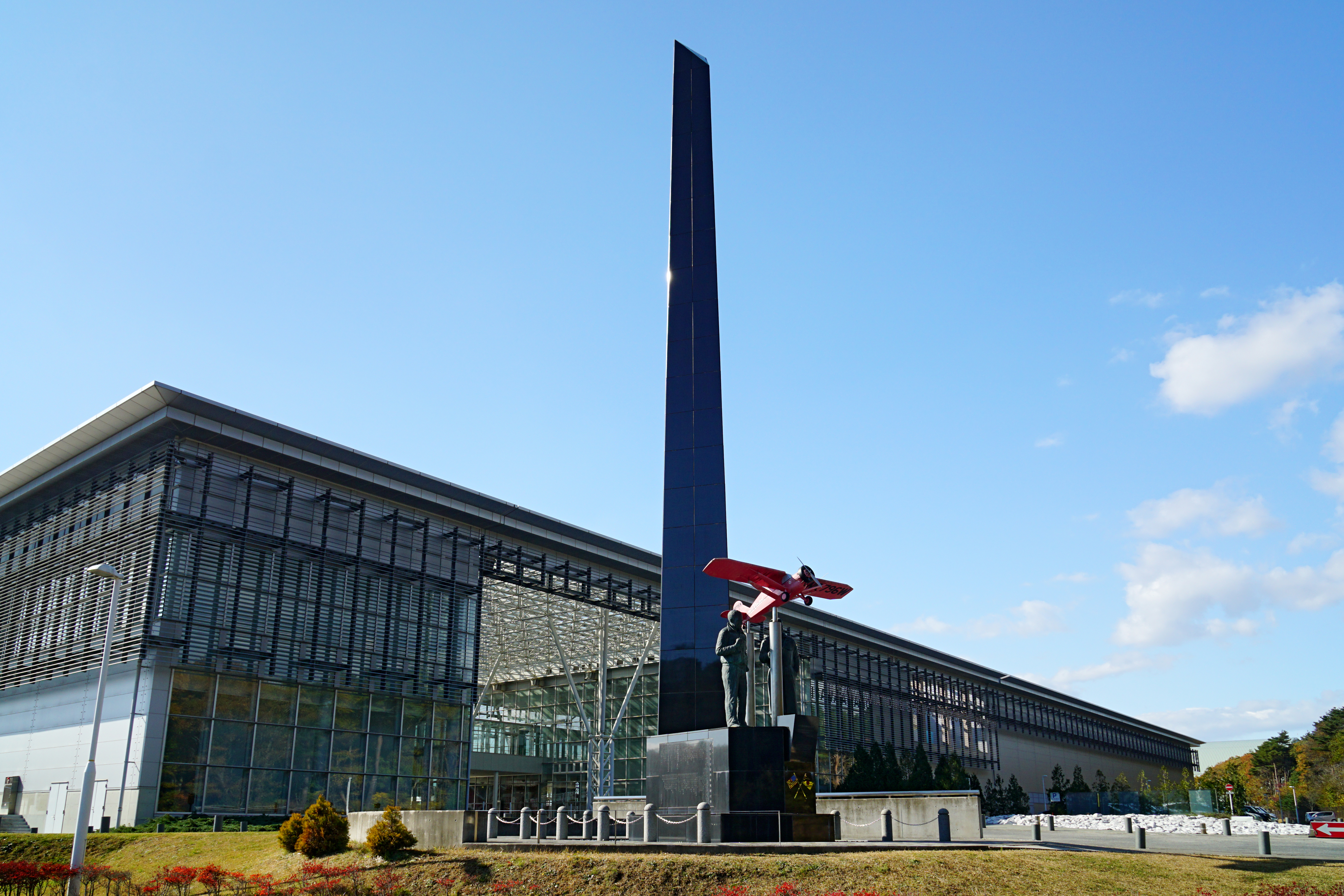
- Misawa Aviation & Science Museum

- Flag Seal

- Location of Misawa in Aomori Prefecture

- Location within Japan
- Coordinates: 40°40′59″N 141°22′09″E
- Country: Japan
- Region: Tōhoku
- Prefecture: Aomori

Government
  - Mayor: Yoshinori Kohiyama

Area
  - Total: 119.39 km^{2} (46.10 sq mi)

Population (30 November 2025)
  - Total: 37,065
  - Density: 310.45/km^{2} (804.07/sq mi)
- Time zone: UTC+9 (Japan Standard Time)
- Phone number: 0176-53-5111
- Address: 1-1-38 Sakurachō, Misawa-shi, Aomori-ken 033-8666
- Climate: Cfa/Dfa
- Website: Official website
- Symbols
- Flower: Satsuki azalea
- Tree: Pine

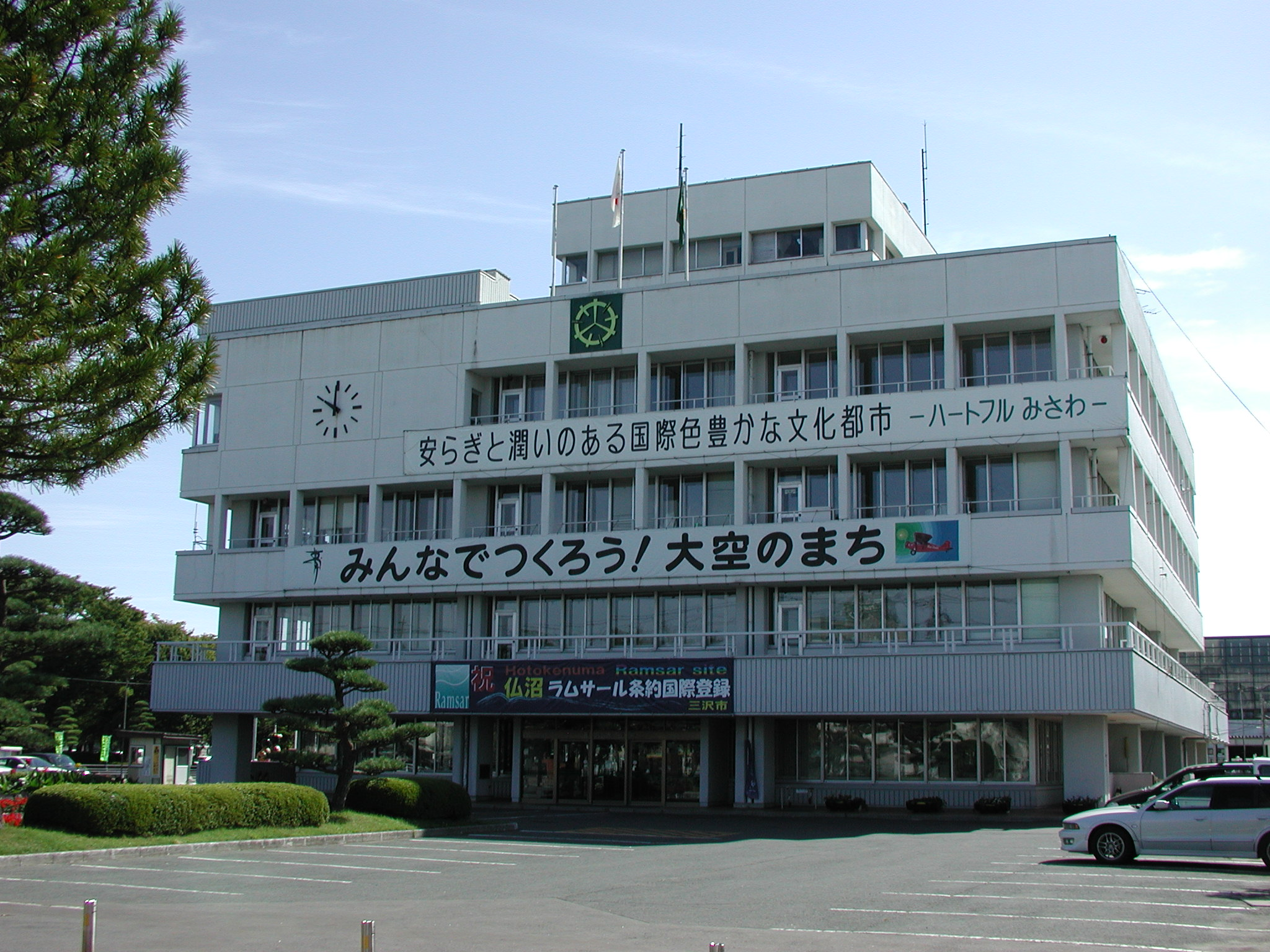
Misawa City Hall

Misawa (三沢市, Misawa-shi) is a city in Aomori Prefecture, Japan. As of 30 November 2025, the city had an estimated population of 37,065 in 19557 households, and a population density of 310 persons per km^{2}. The total area of the city is 119.87 square kilometers (46.28 sq mi).

Misawa is the location of a large military base, Misawa Air Base, which is under joint operation of the United States Air Force's 35th Fighter Wing, Naval Air Facility, and the Japan Air Self-Defense Force's 3rd Fighter Wing. It is also an important US base for signals intelligence and related activities. The city population figures do not include the estimated 10,000 American military personnel and their dependents stationed at Misawa Air Base.

== Geography ==
Misawa is located in the flatlands on the southern shore of Lake Ogawara on the east coast of Aomori Prefecture, facing the Pacific Ocean. The nearest large city is Hachinohe which is 30 to 40 minutes away by car. The surrounding area is mostly rural. There is some limited nightlife, mostly concentrated around the American air base. Misawa has well-defined seasons. Short autumns are followed by the onset of winter temperatures in early December, with lows in January and February, when strong winds exacerbate wind chill. Spring temperatures begin near the vernal equinox. Snowfall is frequent, and in January and February, snow does not melt completely. Icy roads are also a concern as the daytime highs will often melt the snow and then as afternoon temperatures drops below zero, the water from the melted snow and ice refreezes. As the ice and snow clear and the ground dries, dust storms become a hazard near farm fields. In early spring, the winds switch and come from the east off the ocean. Thick sea fog is common in the morning or early evening. The onset of summer usually brings the rainy season. This normally begins in mid-June and continues for an unpredictable period of time. However, it normally clears out around mid to late July. The end of July through August can get quite hot and humid.

=== Neighboring municipalities ===
Aomori Prefecture

- Oirase
- Rokkasho
- Rokunohe
- Tōhoku

== Climate ==
The city has a humid continental climate characterized by hot summers and cold winters with heavy snowfall (Köppen climate classification Dfa). The average annual temperature in Misawa is 9.9 °C. The average annual rainfall is 1172 mm with September as the wettest month. The temperatures are highest on average in August, at around 22.6 °C, and lowest in January, at around -1.9 °C.

Climate data for Misawa (elevation 39 m, 1991–2020 normals, extremes 1976–present)
Month	Jan	Feb	Mar	Apr	May	Jun	Jul	Aug	Sep	Oct	Nov	Dec	Year
Record high °C (°F)	15.0 (59.0)	16.7 (62.1)	23.2 (73.8)	29.2 (84.6)	34.7 (94.5)	35.3 (95.5)	36.4 (97.5)	37.0 (98.6)	34.9 (94.8)	29.1 (84.4)	24.8 (76.6)	18.7 (65.7)	37.0 (98.6)
Mean daily maximum °C (°F)	2.3 (36.1)	3.2 (37.8)	7.3 (45.1)	13.5 (56.3)	18.2 (64.8)	20.5 (68.9)	24.3 (75.7)	26.3 (79.3)	23.6 (74.5)	18.1 (64.6)	11.5 (52.7)	4.9 (40.8)	14.5 (58.1)
Daily mean °C (°F)	−1.1 (30.0)	−0.6 (30.9)	2.8 (37.0)	8.3 (46.9)	13.2 (55.8)	16.3 (61.3)	20.3 (68.5)	22.2 (72.0)	19.2 (66.6)	13.3 (55.9)	7.0 (44.6)	1.2 (34.2)	10.2 (50.4)
Mean daily minimum °C (°F)	−4.4 (24.1)	−4.2 (24.4)	−1.3 (29.7)	3.6 (38.5)	8.8 (47.8)	12.9 (55.2)	17.3 (63.1)	19.2 (66.6)	15.5 (59.9)	8.9 (48.0)	2.9 (37.2)	−2.0 (28.4)	6.4 (43.5)
Record low °C (°F)	−12.5 (9.5)	−14.2 (6.4)	−10.7 (12.7)	−5.4 (22.3)	0.0 (32.0)	4.0 (39.2)	8.0 (46.4)	9.8 (49.6)	5.5 (41.9)	−0.4 (31.3)	−6.6 (20.1)	−11.1 (12.0)	−14.2 (6.4)
Average precipitation mm (inches)	51.7 (2.04)	45.7 (1.80)	58.2 (2.29)	62.4 (2.46)	88.2 (3.47)	105.8 (4.17)	143.0 (5.63)	156.4 (6.16)	164.0 (6.46)	105.6 (4.16)	68.1 (2.68)	61.2 (2.41)	1,110.2 (43.71)
Average precipitation days (≥ 1.0 mm)	11.4	10.2	9.4	8.8	9.9	9.3	11.3	11.1	11.0	9.1	10.5	10.7	122.6
Mean monthly sunshine hours	119.0	124.0	170.5	187.2	192.6	157.7	137.2	149.7	145.6	153.0	126.4	109.1	1,772.1
Source: Japan Meteorological Agency (1991–2020 normals, extremes 1976–present)

== Demographics ==
Per Japanese census data, the population of Misawa has remained relatively stable in recent decades.

Historical population
Year	Pop.	±%
1950	24,790	—
1960	36,570	+47.5%
1970	35,343	−3.4%
1980	39,962	+13.1%
1990	41,343	+3.5%
2000	42,495	+2.8%
2010	41,258	−2.9%
2020	39,152	−5.1%

== History ==
The area around Misawa has been occupied since the Japanese Paleolithic period, and was a major population center for the Emishi people. Numerous Jōmon period remains have been discovered within the borders of Misawa, including within the borders of Misawa Air Base. The area was nominally under control of the Northern Fujiwara in the Heian period, and became part of the holdings granted to the Nanbu clan after the defeat of the North Fujiwara by Minamoto no Yoritomo in the early Kamakura period. The Nanbu established numerous horse ranches, accompanied by a series of numbered fortified settlements in the region. During the Edo period, the area was part of Morioka Domain and was later transferred to the holdings of the subsidiary Shichinohe Domain during the mid-Edo period.. After the Meiji Restoration, the area was settled by many dispossessed ex-samurai from former Aizu Domain.

Per the post-Meiji restoration establishment of the modern municipalities system on 1 April 1889, the village of Misawa was created within Kamikita District through the merger of Misawa and Tengamori hamlets. The area was devastated by a tsunami in March 1896. In 1931, in the first successful nonstop transpacific flight, Clyde Pangborn and Hugh Herndon, in the airplane Miss Veedol, took off from Misawa's Sabishiro Beach and landed in present-day East Wenatchee, Washington in the United States. Coastal areas of Misawa were again devastated by a tsunami in March 1933. An Imperial Japanese Navy Air Service base was established in 1941, and nearby Lake Ogawara was reportedly one of the lakes used by the Imperial Japanese Navy to practice for the attack on Pearl Harbor, due to its shallow depth. The base was heavily bombed by the United States Navy in 1945, and subsequently occupied by the United States after the surrender of Japan at the end of World War II.

On 11 February 1948, the town of Omisawa was founded through the merger of Misawa village with portions of Rokunohe, Shimoda and Uranodate villages. Misawa Airport was opened on 11 January 1952, with Japan Airlines providing scheduled services to Haneda Airport in Tokyo and Chitose Airport in Hokkaidō. The town was renamed Misawa, and elevated to city status on 1 September 1958. Misawa Airport was closed on 31 March 1965. On 11 January 1966, a large fire destroyed most of the center of the city. On 19 August 1969, the 51st annual Japanese High School Baseball Championship was held in Misawa. Misawa Airport reopened on 10 May 1975. In the year 2000, Misawa hosted the winter events for the 55th annual National Sports Festival of Japan.

== Government ==
Misawa has a mayor-council form of government with a directly elected mayor and a unicameral city legislature of 18 members. Misawa contributes one member to the Aomori Prefectural Assembly. In terms of national politics, the city is part of Aomori 2nd district of the lower house of the Diet of Japan.

== Economy ==
Misawa serves as a regional industrial and commercial center, with agriculture and commercial fishing playing secondary roles in the local economy. The large foreign presence at Misawa Air Base also makes a large impact on the local economy.

== Education ==
Misawa has seven public elementary schools and five public middle schools operated by the city government and two public high schools operated by the Aomori Prefectural Board of Education.

== Transportation ==
=== Airport ===
- Misawa Airport

=== Railway ===
Aoimori Railway Company -Aoimori Railway Line

- Misawa

=== Highway ===
- National Route 338

== Sister cities ==
- East Wenatchee, Washington, United States from 23 August 2001
- Wenatchee, Washington, United States from 4 October 1981

== Local attractions ==
- Hotokenuma wetlands, a Ramsar Site
- Lake Ogawara
- Misawa Aviation & Science Museum
- Shūji Terayama Museum
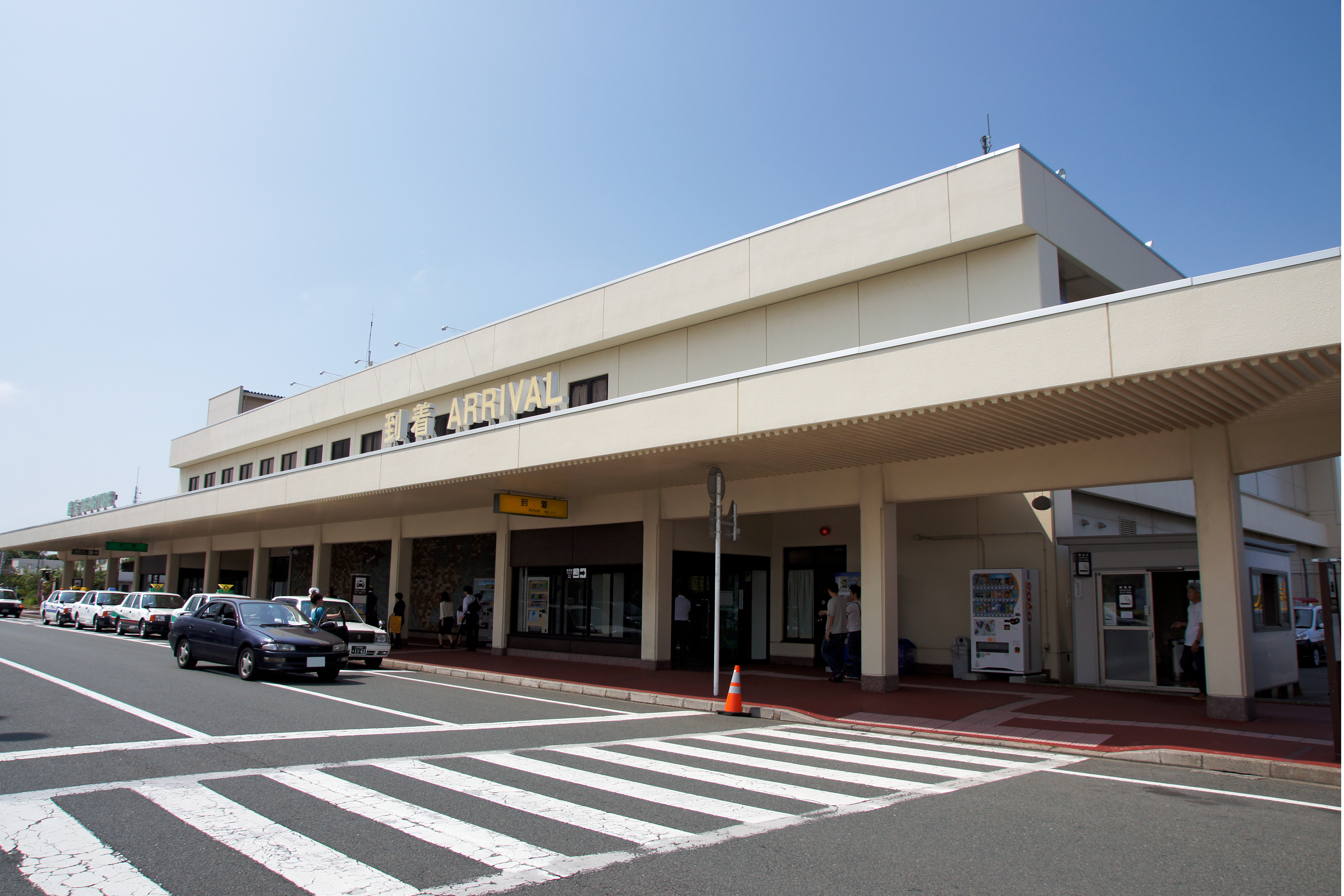
Misawa Airport

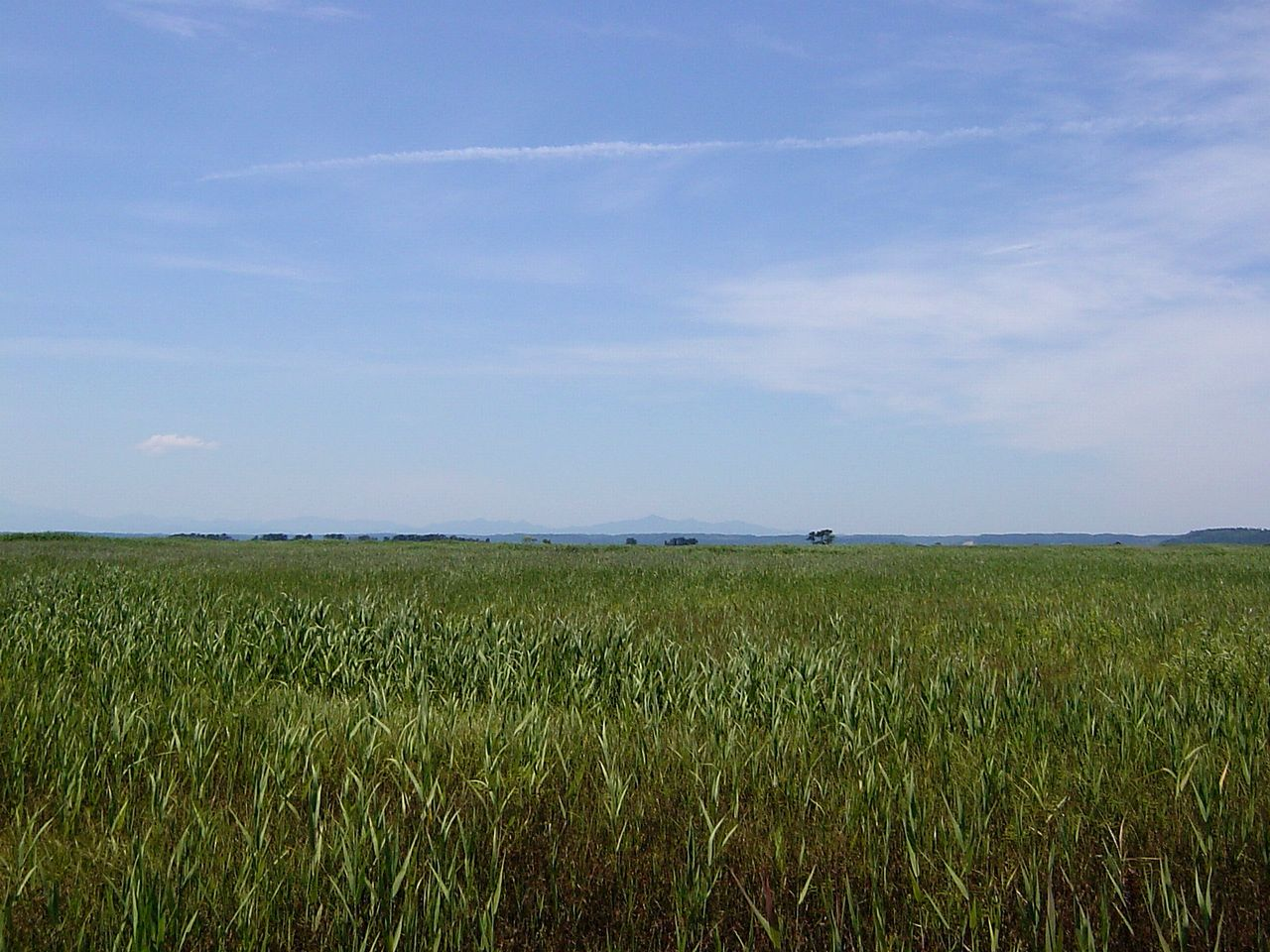
Hotokenuma

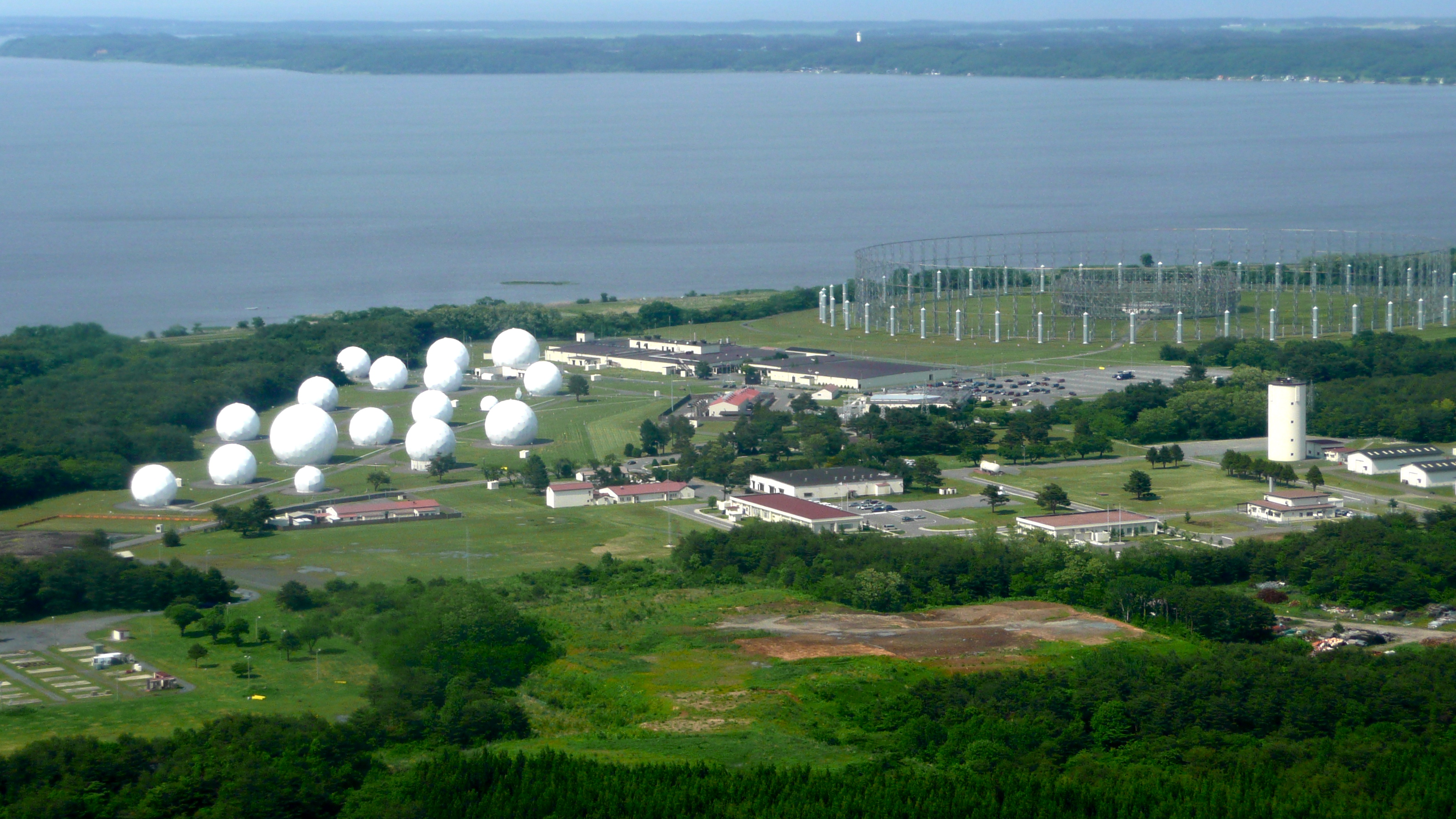
American Air Base at Misawa

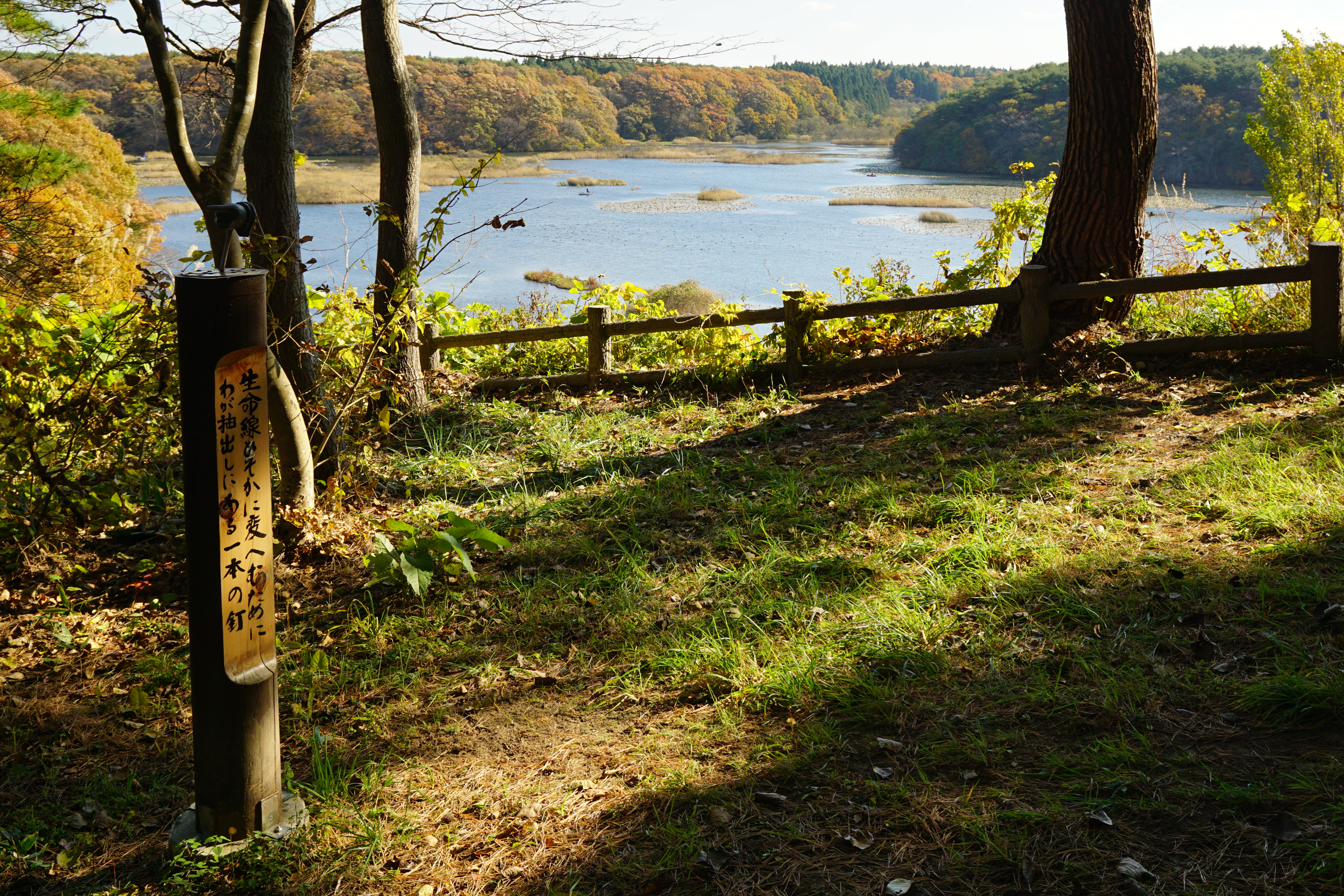
Shuji Terayama Memorial

=== Festivals ===
The city of Misawa boasts many festivals throughout the year, such as the cherry blossom festival, located at "Train Park", the Tanabata festival, and the most local, the Kosuimatsuri, or Lake Ogawara Festival. At the Kosuimatsuri , the new Lake Ogawara Queen is crowned; synonymous to "Miss Misawa", which consists of two women from Misawa between the age of 15–25, and one American citizen from Misawa Air Base, of the same age range. Misawa also hosts "Japan Day" within Misawa Air Base, at the base's Collocated Club. There is also "American Day", occurring generally a week or so after Memorial Day, at which time Japanese and American friendship is strengthened through the festive environment of food vendors and a large parade.

== Noted people from Misawa ==
- ELLY, member of the J-pop boygroup J Soul Brothers.
- Issei Futamata, voice actor
- Byron Howard, film director
- Yoko Imai, actress
- Shinobu Kai, gravure model
- Yukio Kakizaki, professional baseball player
- Norio Kimura, professional boxer
- Masaya Kitamura, politician
- Kahoru Kohiruimaki, musician
- Taishin Kohiruimaki, professional kickboxer
- Kazusa Okuyama, actress
- Koji Ota, professional baseball player
- Takanonami Sadahiro, sumo wrestler
- Akiyoshi Sasaki, professional baseball player
- Kyōichi Sawada, photo journalist
- Yoshimi Tanaka, Japanese Red Army terrorist
- Nozomi Yamamoto, voice actress and rapper
- Act Yasukawa, is a Japanese professional wrestler.
