= Chibiki Station =

Railway station in Tōhoku, Aomori Prefecture, Japan

Chibiki Station 千曳駅
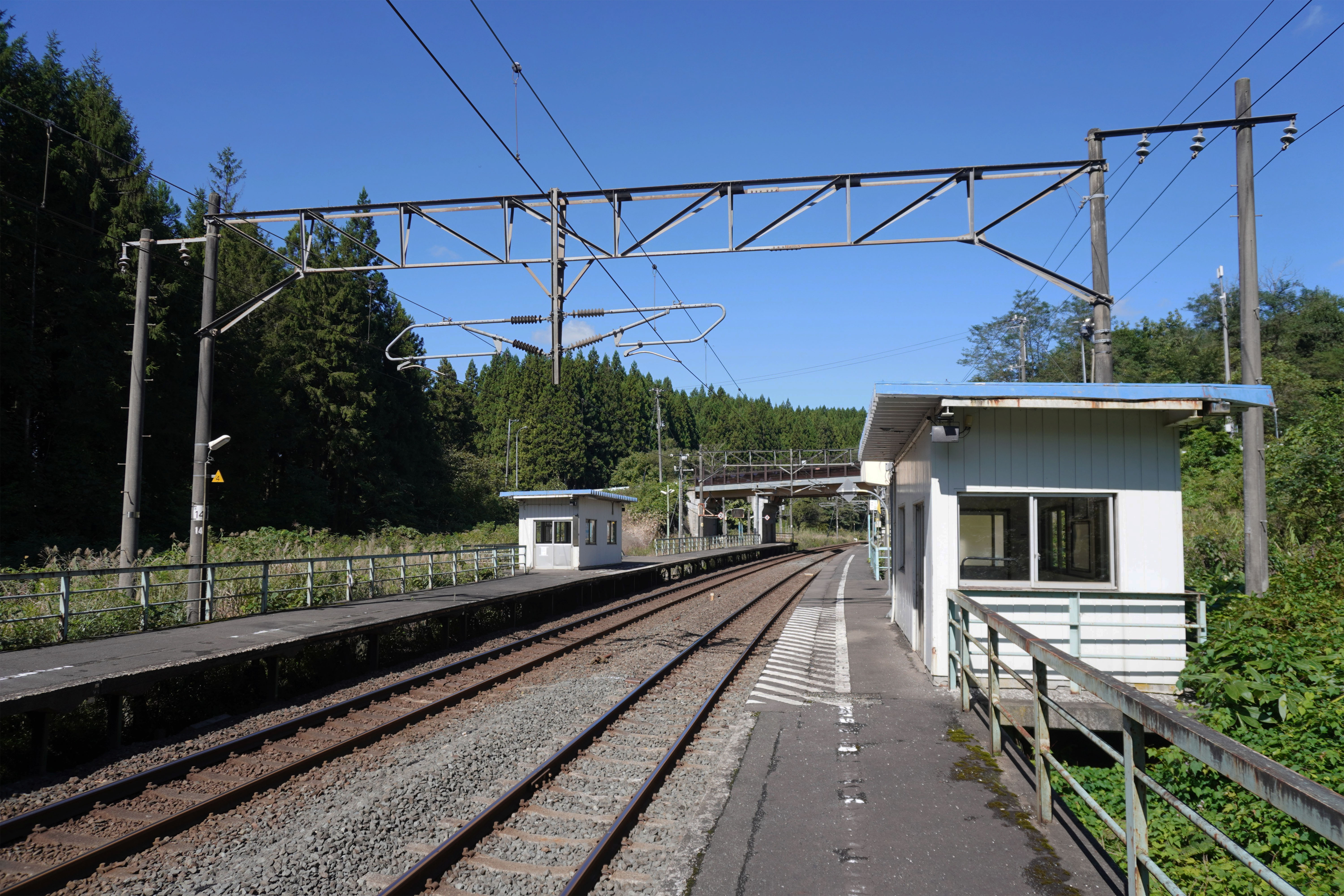
- Chibiki Station in September 2023

General information
- Location: Taihei, Tōhoku, Kamikita District, Aomori Prefecture 039-2675; Japan
- Coordinates: 40°48′17.32″N 141°9′10.14″E
- System: Regional rail station
- Operator: Aoimori Railway
- Line: ■ Aoimori Railway Line
- Distance: 70.9 km from Aomori
- Platforms: 2 side platforms

Construction
- Structure type: At grade

Other information
- Status: Unstaffed
- Website: Official website

History
- Opened: 15 November 1910

Services
Preceding station	Aoimori Railway	Following station
Ottomo towards Metoki	Aoimori Railway Line	Noheji towards Aomori
Location
- Location within Aomori Prefecture Location within Japan

Chibiki Station (千曳駅, Chibiki-eki) is a railway station located in the town of Tōhoku in Aomori Prefecture, Japan. The station has been operating since 1910. Since 2010, the station has been operated by the Aoimori Railway Company, a third sector, regional rail operator. It is the least busy railway station along the Aoimori Railway. Passenger trains serve the station 17 hours a day; trains depart from the station roughly once an hour.

== Location ==
Chibiki Station is located beneath an underpass of Aomori Prefecture Route 8. The station is located in a very rural setting with no houses or buildings within walking distance. It is 70.9 kilometers from the terminus of the line at Aomori Station. It is 688.2 kilometers from Tokyo. The stations adjacent to Chibiki Station along the Aoimori Railway Line are Ottomo Station and Noheji Station.

== Station layout ==
Chibiki Station has two opposed side platforms connected by a road overpass that serve two tracks. There is no station building and the platforms are not numbered. The station is unattended.

=== Platforms ===
east	■ Aoimori Railway Line	for Misawa and Aomori
west	■ Aoimori Railway Line	for Hachinohe

== History ==
Chibiki Station was opened on 15 November 1910 as a station on the Tōhoku Main Line of the Japanese Government Railways (JGR), the pre-war predecessor to the Japan National Railways (JNR). On 20 October 1962, it became a joint station with the now defunct Nanbu Jūkan Railway. On 5 August 1968, the routing of the Tōhoku Main Line slightly changed, and a new station was built, with the original Chibiki Station renamed Nishi-Chibiki Station (西千曳駅) serving only the Nanbu Jūkan Railway. Regularly scheduled freight services were also discontinued with the move. With the privatization of the JNR on 1 April 1987, the station came under the operational control of East Japan Railway Company (JR East).

The section of the Tōhoku Main Line including this station was transferred to Aoimori Railway on 4 December 2010.

== Services ==
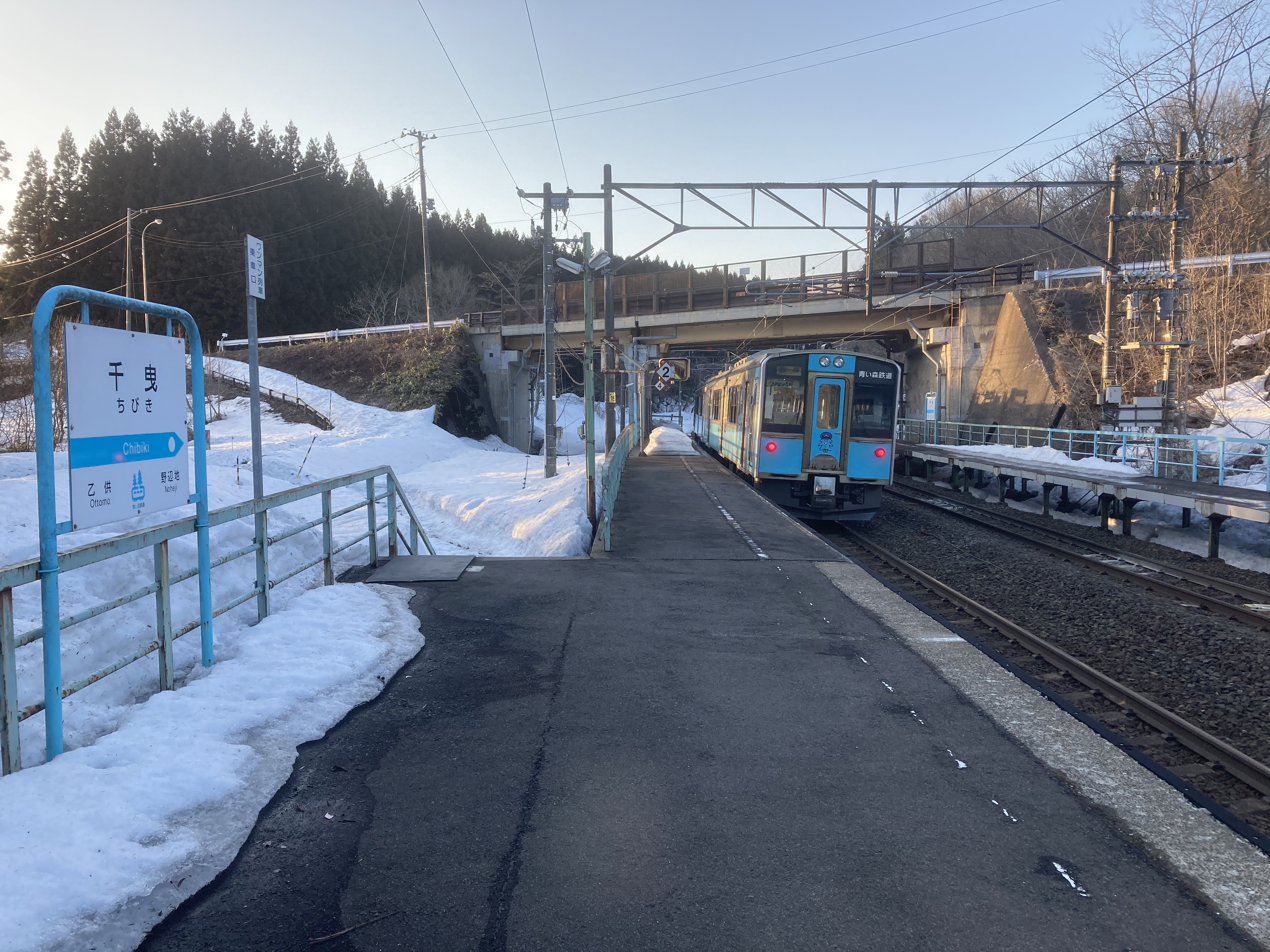
An Aomori-bound Aoimori 701 series set departing from Chibiki Station

The station is only served by trains operating on a local service between Aomori and Hachinohe. It is skipped by rapid express trains, including the Shimokita service operated jointly by JR East and the Aoimori Railway between Aomori and Ōminato and the 560M train operated jointly by the Aoimori Railway and the Iwate Galaxy Railway between Aomori and Morioka. Passenger trains serve Chibiki Station just under 17 hours a day from 6:23 am to 11:11 pm. Trains depart from the station at an approximate hourly basis. In 2018, a daily average of 2 passengers boarded trains at Chibiki Station. In that year Chibiki Station was the least busy out of all the stations on the entire Aoimori Railway Line.

== See also ==
- List of railway stations in Japan
