= Hotokenuma =

Wetland area in Aomori Prefecture, Japan

Coordinates: 40°49′N 141°23′E

- 仏沼
- IUCN category IV (habitat/species management area)
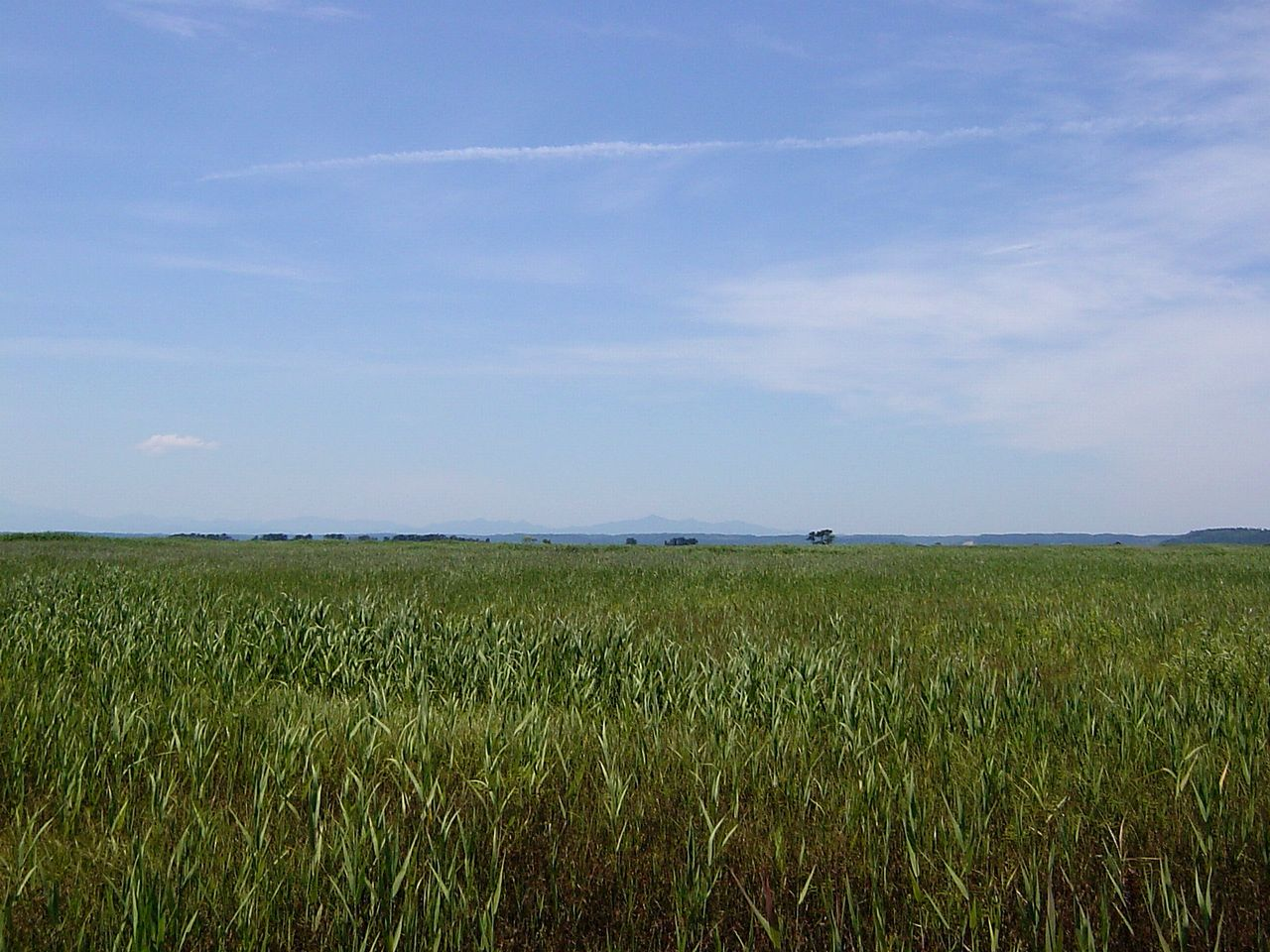
- view of Hotokenuma

- Location within Japan
- Location: Japan
- Nearest city: Misawa, Aomori
- Area: 737 ha (1,820 acres)
- Established: November 1, 2005

Ramsar Wetland
- Designated: 8 November 2005
- Reference no.: 1543

Hotokenuma (仏沼) is a wetland area located in the northern part of the city of Misawa, Aomori Prefecture, in the northern Tōhoku region of Japan. The wetland is connected to the eastern shores of Lake Ogawara at the base of the Shimokita Peninsula.

== Protected area ==
Land reclamation projects began in the 1960s to convert the area into rice paddy fields. In the year 2002, the Ministry of the Environment classified the area to be one of the 500 Important Wetlands in Japan particularly for its diversity of avian life, particularly as a nesting area for the Japanese marsh warbler Subsequently, 737 hectares of the site received national protection as a bird sanctuary on November 1, 2005, of which 222 hectares received the additional designation of a Special Protected Area. This same 222 hectare portion of the site was further designated as a Ramsar Site in on November 8, 2005.

The area is noted for its biodiversity. Per a survey made by the Ministry of the Environment in the year 2000, the area contained:。

- Flora: 52 families, 228 species
- Mammals: 7 families, 11 species
- Bird: 37 families, 161 species
- Amphibians: 6 families. 7 species
- Fish: 5 families, 8 species
- Insects: 43 families, 274 species

== Birds ==
Hotokenuma is home to the Japanese marsh warbler (Locustella pryeri) and the Japanese reed bunting (Emberiza yessoensis), both listed as near-threatened on the IUCN Red List.

== See also ==
- Ramsar Sites in Japan
