= Ottomo Station =

Railway station in Tōhoku, Aomori Prefecture, Japan

Ottomo 乙供
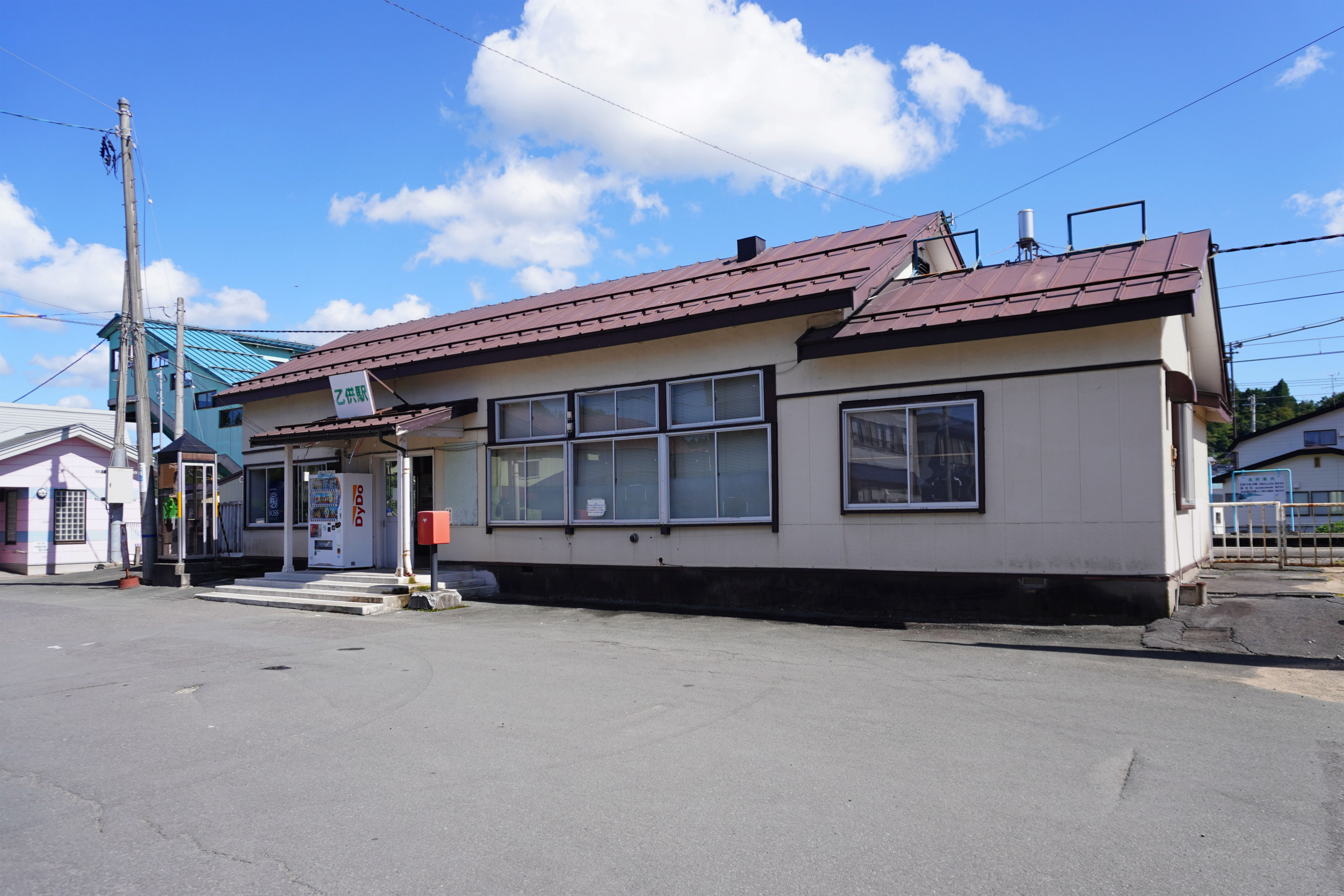
- Ottomo Station in September 2023

General information
- Location: 3 Kamisasabashi, Tōhoku-machi, Kamikita-gun, Aomori-ken 039-2661; Japan
- Coordinates: 40°46′47.78″N 141°12′47.19″E
- System: Regional rail station
- Operator: Aoimori Railway
- Line: ■ Aoimori Railway Line
- Distance: 64.3 km from Aomori
- Platforms: 2 island platforms
- Connections: Bus

Construction
- Structure type: At grade

Other information
- Status: Staffed
- Website: Official website

History
- Opened: January 1, 1894

Services
Preceding station	Aoimori Railway	Following station
Kamikitachō towards Hachinohe	Shimokita (limited service)	Noheji Terminus
Kamikitachō towards Metoki	Aoimori Railway Line	Chibiki towards Aomori
Location
- Location within Aomori Prefecture Location within Japan

Ottomo Station (乙供駅, Ottomo-eki) is a railway station in the town of Tōhoku in Aomori Prefecture, Japan, operated by the third sector railway operator Aoimori Railway Company.

== Lines ==
Ottomo Station is served by the Aoimori Railway Line, and is 64.3 kilometers from the terminus of the line at Aomori Station. It is 681.6 kilometers from Tokyo Station.

== Station layout ==
Ottomo Station has two ground-level island platforms connected by a footbridge; however, one side of each platform is not in use. The station is staffed.

=== Platforms ===
1	■ Aoimori Railway Line	for Noheji and Aomori
3	■ Aoimori Railway Line	for Misawa and Hachinohe

== Bus services ==
- Towada Kanko bus stop
  - For Shichinohe

== History ==
Ottomo Station was opened on January 1, 1894 as a station on the Nippon Railway. On January 1, 1906, with the nationalization of the Nippon Railway, it became a station of the Tōhoku Main Line of the Japanese Government Railways (JGR), the pre-war predecessor to the Japan National Railways (JNR). Regularly scheduled freight services were discontinued from March 15, 1972. With the privatization of the JNR on April 1, 1987, it came under the operational control of East Japan Railway Company (JR East).

The section of the Tōhoku Main Line including this station was transferred to Aoimori Railway on December 4, 2010.

== Surrounding area ==
- Tohoku town office
- Ottomo Post Office
- National Route 394

== See also ==
- List of railway stations in Japan
