= Kamikita =

Kamikita (written: 上北 or 神北) is a Japanese surname. Notable people with the surname include:

- Futago Kamikita, twin Japanese manga artists, Jitsuna Kamikita (上北 実那) and Kizuna Kamikita (上北 希沙)

Fictional characters:

- Komari Kamikita (神北 小毬), character in the visual novel Little Busters!

== See also ==
- Kamikita District, Aomori, a district in Aomori Prefecture, Japan
- Kamikita, Aomori, a former town in Aomori Prefecture, Japan
- Kamikita Expressway|, an expressway in Aomori Prefecture, Japan
