= Tsutsui Station (Aomori) =

Railway station in Aomori, Aomori Prefecture, Japan

Tsutsui Station 筒井駅
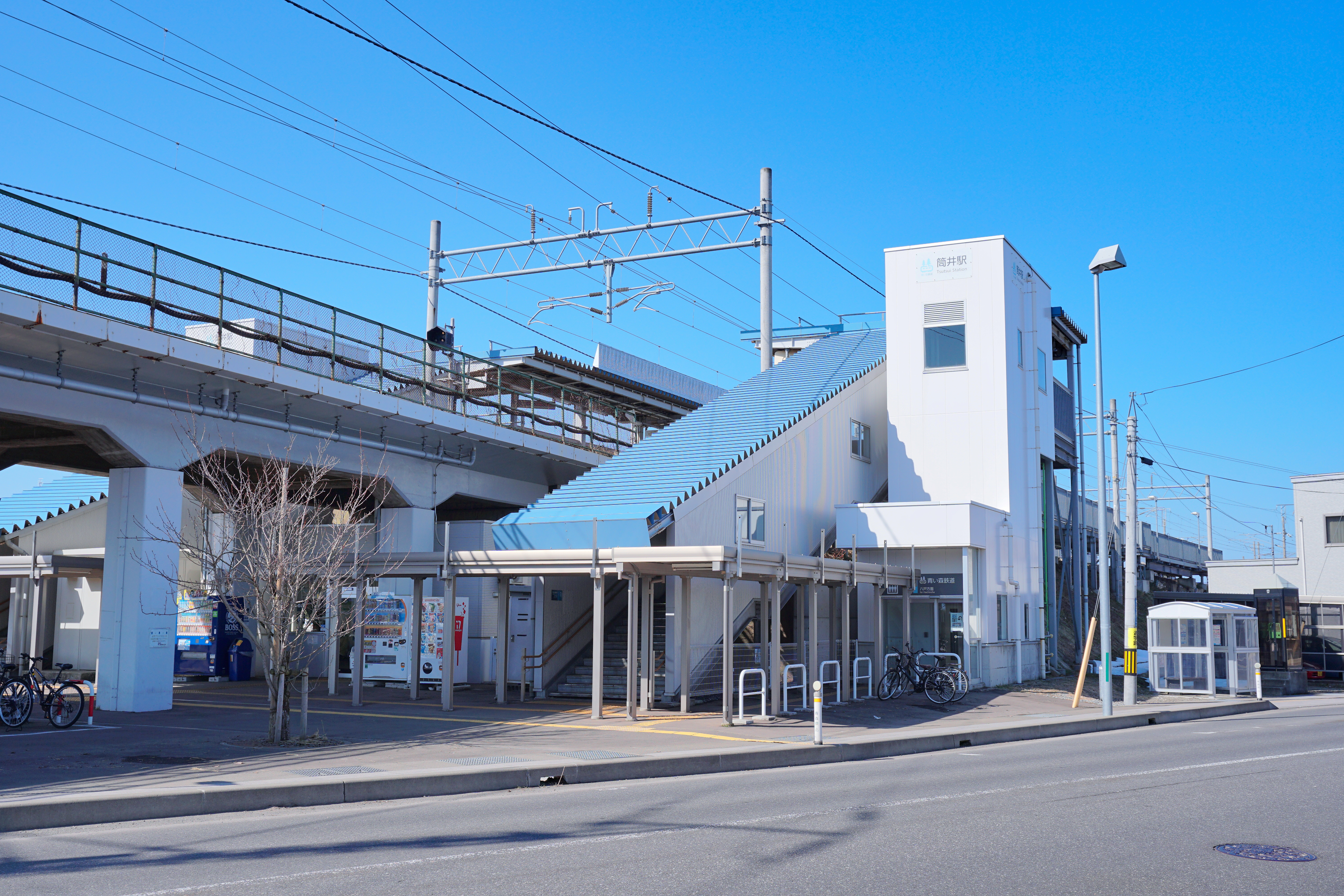
- Tsutsui Station in March 2024

General information
- Location: Tsutsui 3-chōme, Aomori, Aomori Prefecture 030-0944; Japan
- Coordinates: 40°48′20″N 140°46′12″E
- System: Regional rail station
- Operator: Aoimori Railway
- Line: ■ Aoimori Railway Line
- Distance: 117.5 km from Metoki
- Platforms: 2 side platforms
- Tracks: 2

Other information
- Status: Unstaffed
- Website: Official website

History
- Opened: 15 March 2014

Services
Preceding station	Aoimori Railway	Following station
Higashi-Aomori towards Metoki	Aoimori Railway Line	Aomori Terminus
Location
- Location within Aomori Prefecture Location within Japan

Tsutsui Station (筒井駅, Tsutsui-eki) is a railway station on the Aoimori Railway Line in the city of Aomori in Aomori Prefecture, Japan, operated by the third sector railway operating company Aoimori Railway Company.

== Location ==
Tsutsui Station is served by the 123.3 km (76.6 mi) Aoimori Railway Line between Metoki and Aomori, and is located between Higashi-Aomori and Aomori stations.

=== Surrounding area ===
- Aomori High School
- Tsutsui Middle School
- Tsutsui Elementary School

== Station layout ==
The station consists of two elevated side platforms serving two tracks. The platforms are long enough to handle four-car trains. The station is unstaffed. A ticket vending machine, waiting room, and lifts to the platforms are located on the ground floor level.

=== Platforms ===
1	■ Aoimori Railway Line	for Noheji, Misawa and Hachinohe
2	■ Aoimori Railway Line	for Aomori

== History ==
Intended to provide access for the nearby Aomori High School, construction of the station commenced in June 2012. The name "Tsutsui" for the station was announced by Aomori Prefecture on 27 June 2013. It formally opened from the start of the revised timetable on 15 March 2014.

== See also ==
- List of railway stations in Japan
