= Tōhoku, Aomori =

Tōhoku 東北町
- Town
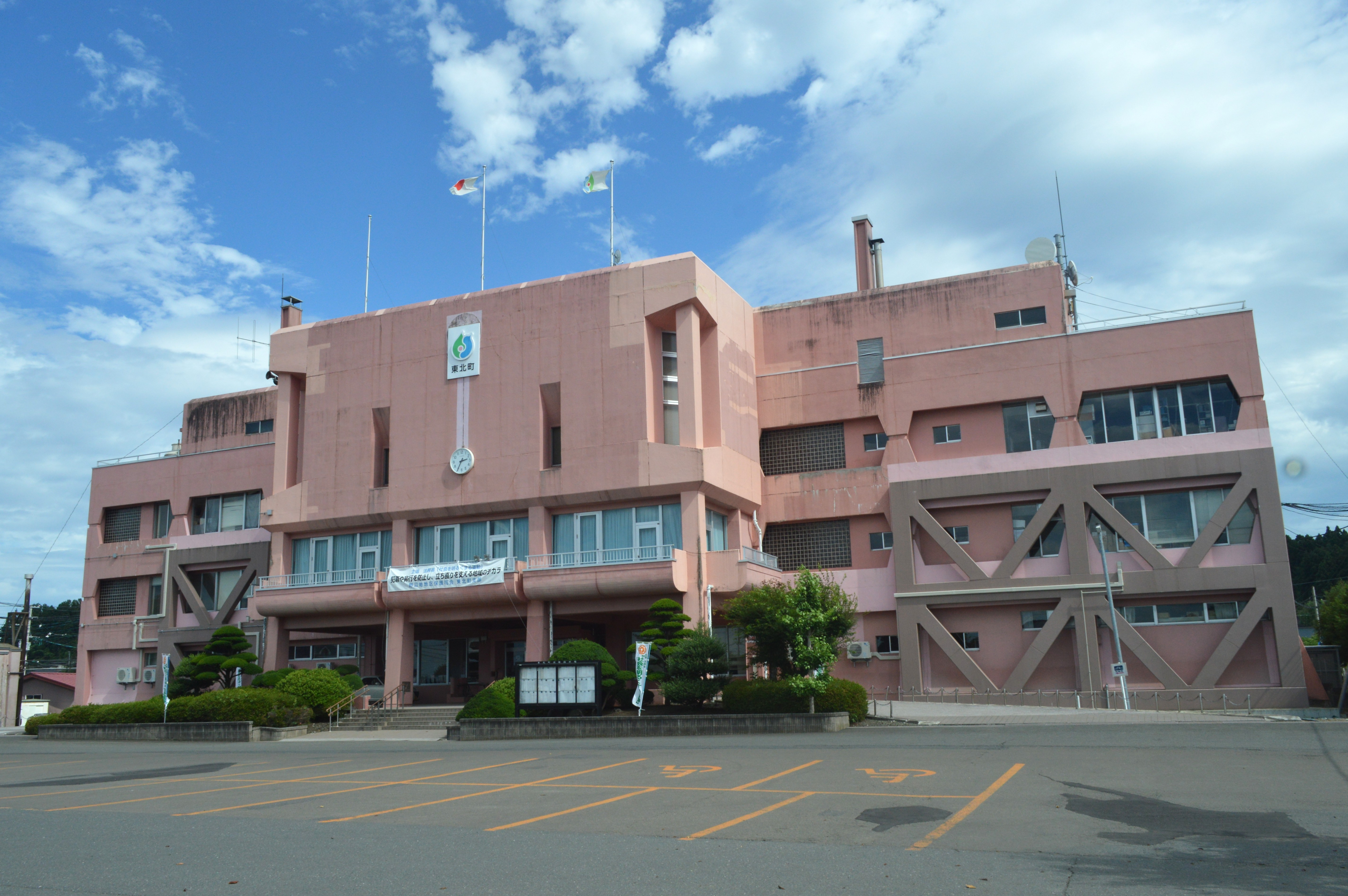
- Tōhoku Town Hall

- Flag Seal
- Location of Tōhoku in Aomori Prefecture

- Coordinates: 40°43′40″N 141°15′28″E
- Country: Japan
- Region: Tōhoku
- Prefecture: Aomori
- District: Kamikita

Area
  - Total: 326.50 km^{2} (126.06 sq mi)

Population (September 30, 2025)
  - Total: 15,795
  - Density: 48.377/km^{2} (125.30/sq mi)
- Time zone: UTC+9 (Japan Standard Time)
- Phone number: 0176-56-3111
- Address: 4-32-484 Kamikita-Minami, Tohoku-machi, Kamikita-gun, Aomori-ken 039-2492
- Website: Official website
- Symbols
- Bird: Swan
- Flower: Sakura
- Tree: Japanese Red Pine

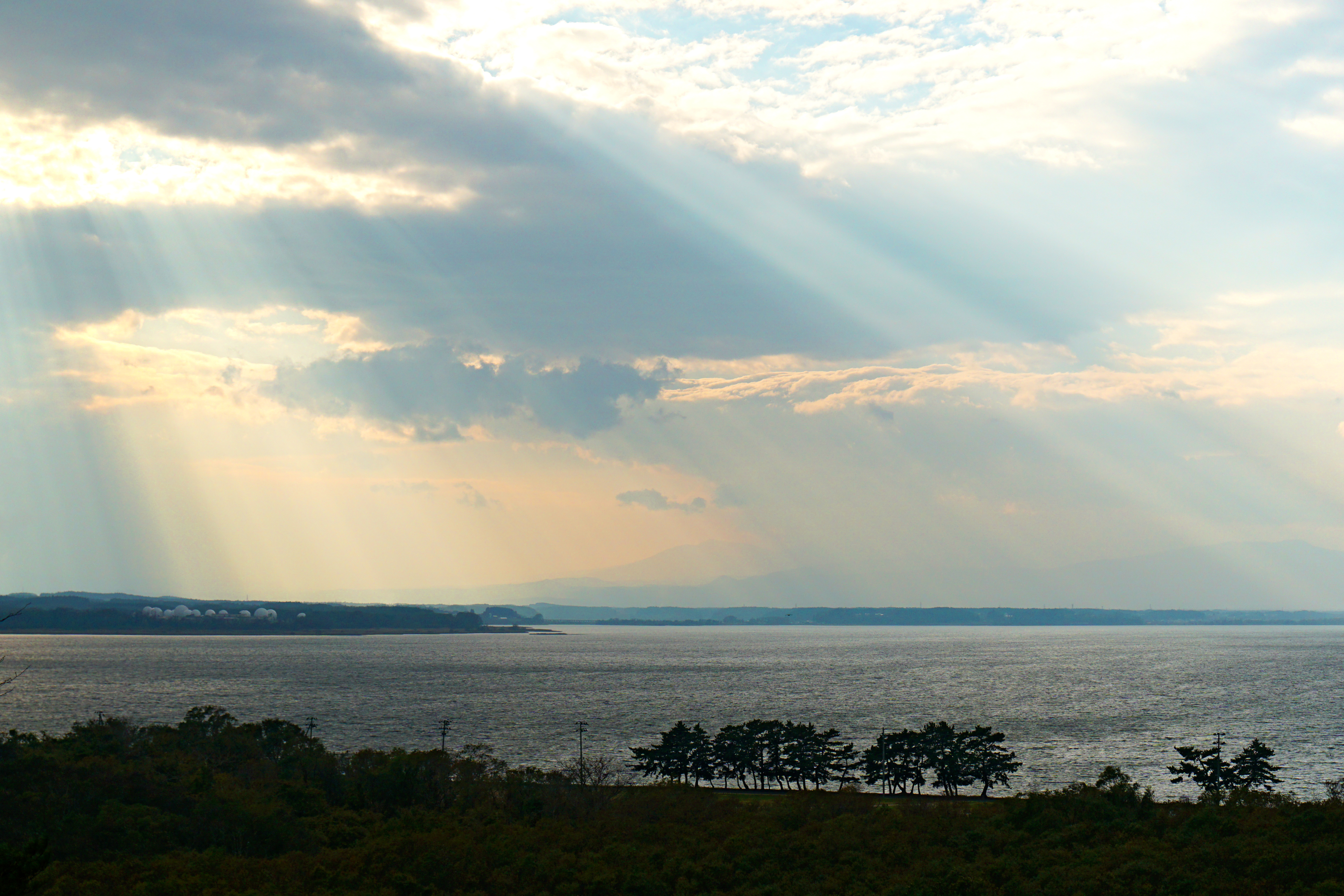
Lake Ogawara from Tōhoku town

Tōhoku (東北町, Tōhoku-machi) is a town located in Aomori Prefecture, Japan. As of 30 September 2025, the town had an estimated population of 15,795 in 7308 households, and a population density of 48 persons per km^{2} in 7,269 households. The total area of the town is 326.50 km^{2} (126.06 sq mi).

== Geography ==
Tōhoku is located in north-central Aomori Prefecture, bordering on the west shore of Lake Ogawara.

=== Neighboring municipalities ===
Aomori Prefecture

- Hiranai
- Misawa
- Noheji
- Rokkasho
- Rokunohe
- Shichinohe
- Towada

=== Climate ===
The town has a cold maritime climate characterized by cool short summers and long cold winters with heavy snowfall (Köppen climate classification Cfa). The average annual temperature in Tōhoku is 9.8 °C. The average annual rainfall is 1217 mm with September as the wettest month. The temperatures are highest on average in August, at around 22.5 °C, and lowest in January, at around −2.1 °C.

== Demographics ==
Per Japanese census data, the population of Tōhoku has steadily declined over the past 60 years.

Historical population

Year	Pop.	±%
1950	22,028	—
1960	25,610	+16.3%
1970	23,588	−7.9%
1980	22,587	−4.2%

Year	Pop.	±%
1990	21,553	−4.6%
2000	20,591	−4.5%
2010	19,106	−7.2%
2020	16,428	−14.0%

== History ==
During the Edo period, the area around Tōhoku was controlled by the Nambu clan of Morioka Domain, becoming part of the territories of Shichinohe Domain in the latter half of the Edo period. In the post-Meiji Restoration establishment of the modern municipalities system on 1 April 1889, Katchi (甲地村, Katchi-mura) was created. It was elevated to town status on November 1, 1963, at which time it was renamed to its present name. The neighboring town of Kamikita merged with Tōhoku on March 31, 2005.

== Government ==
Tōhoku has a mayor-council form of government with a directly elected mayor and a unicameral town council of 12 members. Tōhoku is part of Kamikita District which contributes four members to the Aomori Prefectural Assembly. In terms of national politics, the town is part of Aomori 2nd district of the lower house of the Diet of Japan.

== Economy ==
The economy of Tōhoku is heavily dependent on agriculture, based primarily on production of nagaimo, daikon and carrots as well as lake fish, including smelt, icefish and shijimi.

== Education ==
Tōhoku has three public elementary schools and two public middle schools operated by the town government. The town does not have a high school.

== Transportation ==
=== Railway ===
Aoimori Railway Company – Aoimori Railway Line

- Kogawara - Kamikitachō - Ottomo - Chibiki

=== Highway ===
- Kamikita Expressway
- Shimokita Expressway
- National Route 4
- National Route 45 (unsigned)
- National Route 394

== Local attractions ==
- Ginkgo trees: There are two, one 800 years old and the other 650 years old. Both are designated as town cultural assets.
- Monument to the Center of Japan: Discovered in 1949, this stone monument bears the inscription "Center of Japan." Its origins are unknown, but it is said to have been erected by Sakanoue no Tamuramaro during the Heian period, but this is not certain.
- Furuyashiki Shell Mound
- Lake Ogawara
- Tohoku Town History and Folklore Museum - Exhibits include a Naumann's elephant molar, a tiger jawbone, and Jomon period human bones.
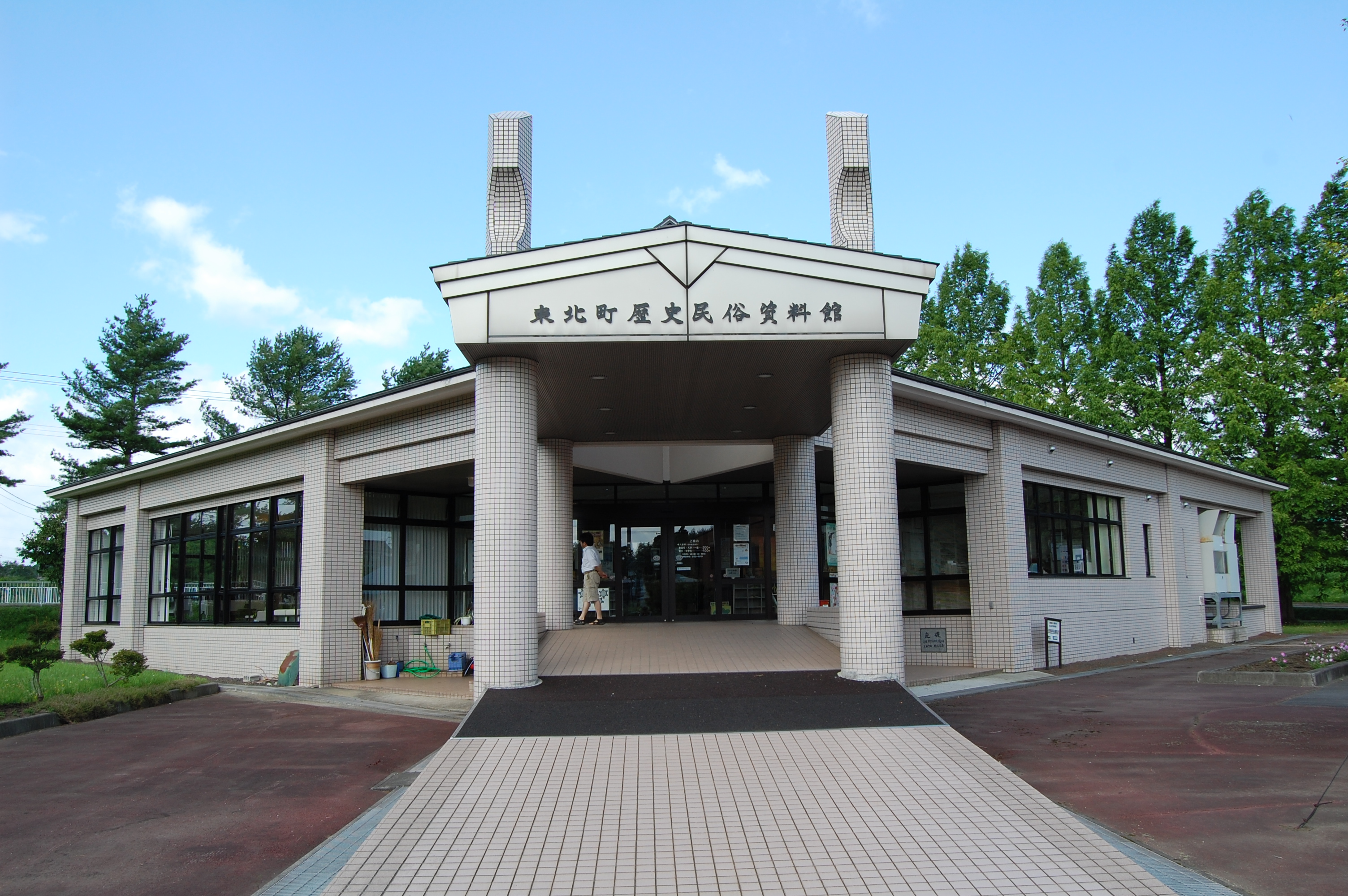
Tohoku Town History and Folklore Museum

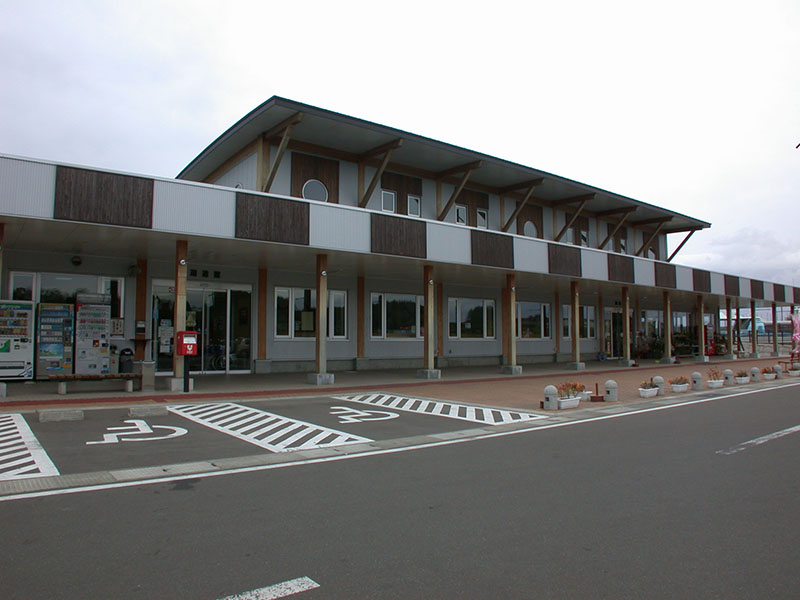
Tohoku road station

== Noted people from Tōhoku ==
- Mitsuru Fukikoshi, actor
- Takemi Sasaki, jockey
- Masato Shibata, jockey
- Yoshitomi Shibata, jockey
