= Third-sector railway =

Japanese railway companies operated by both public and private entities

In Japan, third-sector railways (Japanese: 第三セクター鉄道, Hepburn: dai-san sekutā tetsudō), sometimes translated as semi-public sector railways, are railways operated by corporations jointly financed by public and private interests. These companies are typically owned by a prefectural or municipal government together with private investors, with both public and private shareholders participating in management of the railway. Many third-sector railways were created to operate mostly rural lines of the former JR Group or Japanese National Railways (JNR) lines that were unprofitable.

The Deficit 83 Lines and specified local lines were among the categories of railway lines proposed for closure or transfer to third-sector operators during the 20th century.

== Etymology ==
In Japan, railway operators are traditionally classified into three sectors:

- First sector: This group includes all government-operated enterprises, including the successors to the former Japanese National Railways (JNR).
  - All six of the Japan Railways Group (JR) companies serving passengers have been privatized and converted to Japanese joint-stock companies (株式会社, kabushiki gaisha, KK). Four have been subsequently listed as publicly traded companies after becoming financially profitable. Despite this restructuring, they remain classified as "first-sector" given they are successors to JNR and operate under substantial government regulatory control via the Ministry of Land, Infrastructure, Transport and Tourism.
- Second sector: This group includes all private railway companies (私鉄, Shitetsu; or 民鉄, Mintetsu). These are almost always organized as a KK, but may be any type of private business entity. While structured as a private corporation, some companies may also have government shareholders.
  - For example, Osaka Metro Co., Ltd., which runs the Osaka Metro, was privatized on April 1, 2018, but is still fully owned by the Osaka Municipal Government.
- Third sector: This group includes all railways operated by corporations jointly financed by public and private interests, and often have a prior history of full government ownership.
  - For example, Aoimori Railway Company operates the Aoimori Railway Line, a privatization of former JR East track along the Tōhoku Main Line (transferred after the opening of the parallel Tōhoku Shinkansen). Aoimori Railway Company is majority-owned by Aomori Prefecture, with minority ownership stakes by both other levels of government and private sector investors.

== Establishment ==
Third-sector railways have traditionally been established through the transfer of existing lines formerly operated by first- or second-sector operators, or through the construction of new transportation systems in areas undergoing development, which in addition to conventional railways have also included automated guideway transit and monorail lines.

Since the 2000s, third-sector railway companies have increasingly been established to operate conventional local lines that parallel newly extended Shinkansen routes. Local governments have sought to preserve these services even when the loss of long-distance passenger traffic makes them less financially viable. Transferring the local service to a third-sector company allows local governments and other public entities to provide financial support while maintaining a separate operating company. In most cases, the former JR operator has also retained a shareholding in the new company.

One of the earliest examples of this arrangement followed the extension of the Tōhoku Shinkansen from Morioka to Hachinohe in December 2002. Portions of JR East's Tōhoku Main Line were transferred to the Aoimori Railway and Iwate Galaxy Railway.

A similar arrangement has been used with extensions of the Hokuriku Shinkansen. When the line was extended from Kanazawa in Ishikawa Prefecture to Tsuruga in Fukui Prefecture in March 2024, JR West transferred operation of the parallel conventional line to the newly established Hapi-Line Fukui. Earlier extensions of the Hokuriku Shinkansen had resulted in similar transfers to the IR Ishikawa Railway, Ainokaze Toyama Railway, and Echigo TOKImeki Railway.

== Pros and cons ==
As local governments with close contacts to communities and private companies with experience running rail infrastructure are jointly invested in these lines, there is an elevated level of flexibility in management and adjustment of operations, which can be done according to frequently changing circumstances and needs of local communities. These lines, however, are most often unprofitable, require funding via taxes, and may still run the risk of facing closure due to low ridership.

== See also ==
- List of Japanese third-sector railway lines
- List of Japanese second-sector private railway lines
