= Aoimori Railway Line =

Railway line in Aomori prefecture, Japan

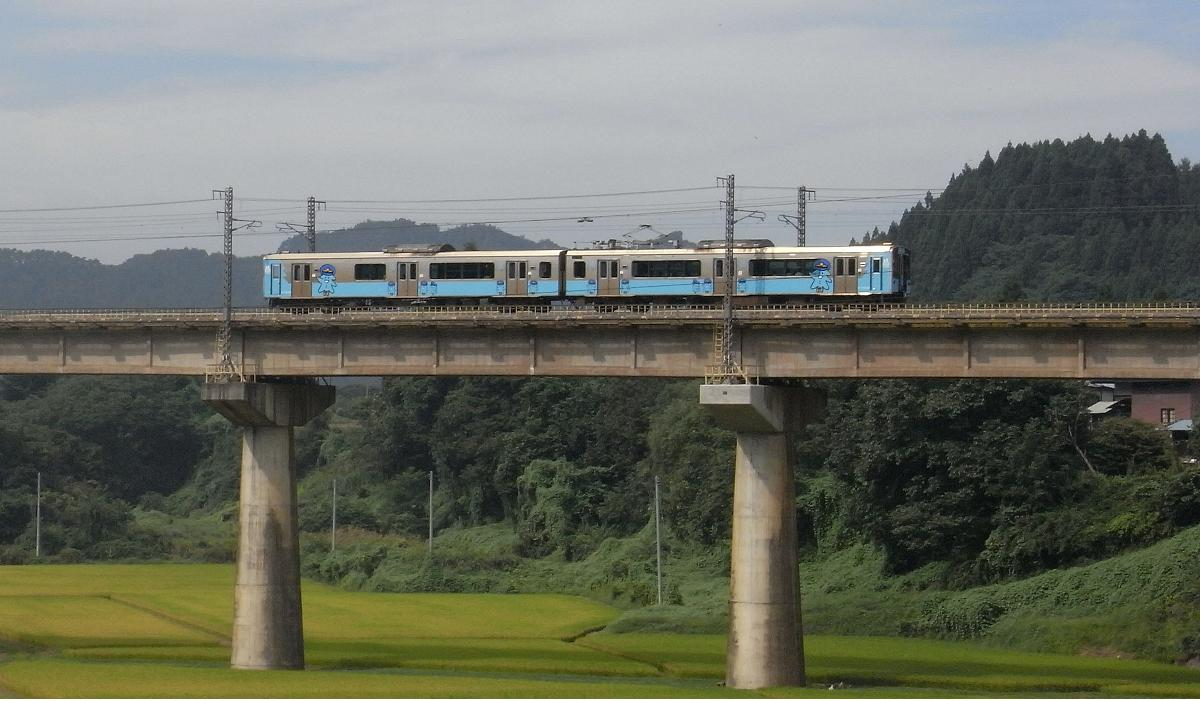
- Aoimori Railway 701 series EMU in September 2010

Overview
- Native name: 青い森鉄道線
- Owner: Aoimori Railway Company
- Locale: Aomori Prefecture
- Termini: Metoki; Aomori
- Stations: 26

Service
- Type: Regional rail
- Rolling stock: Aoimori 701 series, Aoimori 703 series

History
- Opened: 1 September 1891 (as part of the Nippon Railway); 1 December 2002 (as the Aoimori Railway Line between Metoki and Hachinohe); 4 December 2010 (as the Aoimori Railway Line between Hachinohe and Aomori)

Technical
- Line length: 121.9 km (75.7 mi)
- Track gauge: 1,067 mm (3 ft 6 in)
- Electrification: Overhead line, 20 kV 50 Hz AC
- Operating speed: 100 km/h (62 mph)
Route map

The Aoimori Railway Line (Japanese: 青い森鉄道線, Hepburn: Aoimori Tetsudō-sen) is a regional rail line in Aomori Prefecture, Japan that is operated by third-sector railway company Aoimori Railway Company. It connects Metoki Station in Sannohe, the terminal station of the Iwate Galaxy Railway Line, to Aomori Station in Aomori.

The Aoimori and Iwate Galaxy Railway Lines are former sections of the JR East Tōhoku Main Line (in Aomori Prefecture and Iwate Prefecture respectively) that connected Tokyo to Aomori. When the Tōhoku Shinkansen was opened (to Hachinohe on 1 December 2002 and to Shin-Aomori on 4 December 2010), the corresponding sections of the Tōhoku Main Line were transferred from East Japan Railway Company (JR East) to Aoimori Railway Company as the Aoimori Railway Line.

While local passenger services on the line are operated by Aoimori Railway Company, JR East operates the Shimokita Rapid train along part of the line, and Japan Freight Railway Company (JR Freight) (which owns a minority stake in Aoimori Railway Company) transports freight along the line. For maintenance work, the line relies on the services of the Hachinohe Rinkai Railway Company.

== Operation ==
The Aoimori Railway Line operates in two sections, between Metoki and Hachinohe, and between Hachinohe and Aomori. No services commence or terminate at Metoki; all trains continue through to or from Morioka on the Iwate Galaxy Railway Line.

East Japan Railway Company (JR East) operates the Shimokita rapid service between Hachinohe and Ōminato on the Ōminato Line, using the Aoimori Railway Line between Hachinohe and Noheji. As of September 2025, three Shimokita round trips operate daily.

All services operated by Aoimori Railway Company, including through services on the Iwate Galaxy Railway Line, are local trains that stop at every station.

== Stations ==
All stations are in Aomori Prefecture.

Station	Distance in km (mi)		Shimokita	Transfers	Location
Station	Between stations	Total	Shimokita	Transfers	Location
↑ Through-running to/from Morioka via the Iwate Galaxy Railway Line ↑
Metoki 目時	—N/a	0.0 (0)		Iwate Galaxy Railway Line (through service)	Sannohe
Sannohe 三戸	5.5 (3.4)	5.5 (3.4)			Nanbu
Suwanotaira 諏訪ノ平	4.0 (2.5)	9.5 (5.9)			Nanbu
Kenyoshi 剣吉	5.3 (3.3)	14.8 (9.2)			Nanbu
Tomabechi 苫米地	3.4 (2.1)	18.2 (11.3)			Nanbu
Kitatakaiwa 北高岩	2.8 (1.7)	21.0 (13.0)			Hachinohe
Hachinohe 八戸	4.9 (3.0)	25.9 (16.1)	●	Tōhoku Shinkansen; Hachinohe Line	Hachinohe
Mutsu-Ichikawa 陸奥市川	6.9 (4.3)	32.8 (20.4)	|		Hachinohe
Shimoda 下田	4.2 (2.6)	37.0 (23.0)	●		Oirase
Mukaiyama 向山	5.2 (3.2)	42.2 (26.2)	|		Oirase
Misawa 三沢	4.7 (2.9)	46.9 (29.1)	●		Misawa
Kogawara 小川原	6.6 (4.1)	53.5 (33.2)	|		Tōhoku
Kamikitachō 上北町	3.9 (2.4)	57.4 (35.7)	●		Tōhoku
Ottomo 乙供	6.9 (4.3)	64.3 (40.0)	|		Tōhoku
Chibiki 千曳	6.6 (4.1)	70.9 (44.1)	|		Tōhoku
Noheji 野辺地	6.4 (4.0)	77.3 (48.0)	●	Ōminato Line (some through service)	Noheji
Karibasawa 狩場沢	6.5 (4.0)	83.8 (52.1)			Hiranai
Shimizugawa 清水川	4.7 (2.9)	88.5 (55.0)			Hiranai
Kominato 小湊	6.0 (3.7)	94.5 (58.7)			Hiranai
Nishi-Hiranai 西平内	3.8 (2.4)	98.3 (61.1)			Hiranai
Asamushi-Onsen 浅虫温泉	6.4 (4.0)	104.7 (65.1)			Aomori
Nonai 野内	6.5 (4.0)	111.2 (69.1)			Aomori
Yadamae 矢田前	1.5 (0.93)	112.7 (70.0)			Aomori
Koyanagi 小柳	2.0 (1.2)	114.7 (71.3)			Aomori
Higashi-Aomori 東青森	1.4 (0.87)	116.1 (72.1)			Aomori
Tsutsui 筒井	1.4 (0.87)	117.5 (73.0)			Aomori
Aomori 青森	4.4 (2.7)	121.9 (75.7)		Ōu Main Line; Tsugaru	Aomori

== Rolling stock and equipment ==
- Aoimori 701 series 2-car EMUs x9
- Aoimori 703 series 2-car EMUs x2

The Aoimori Railway operates a fleet of 701 series two-car electric multiple units (EMUs). One set was built from new in September 2002, while eight more were transferred from JR East.

Two new two-car Aoimori 703 series EMUs were delivered in November 2013 and introduced from the start of the 15 March 2014 timetable revision.

Rolling stock on the Aoimori Railway Line
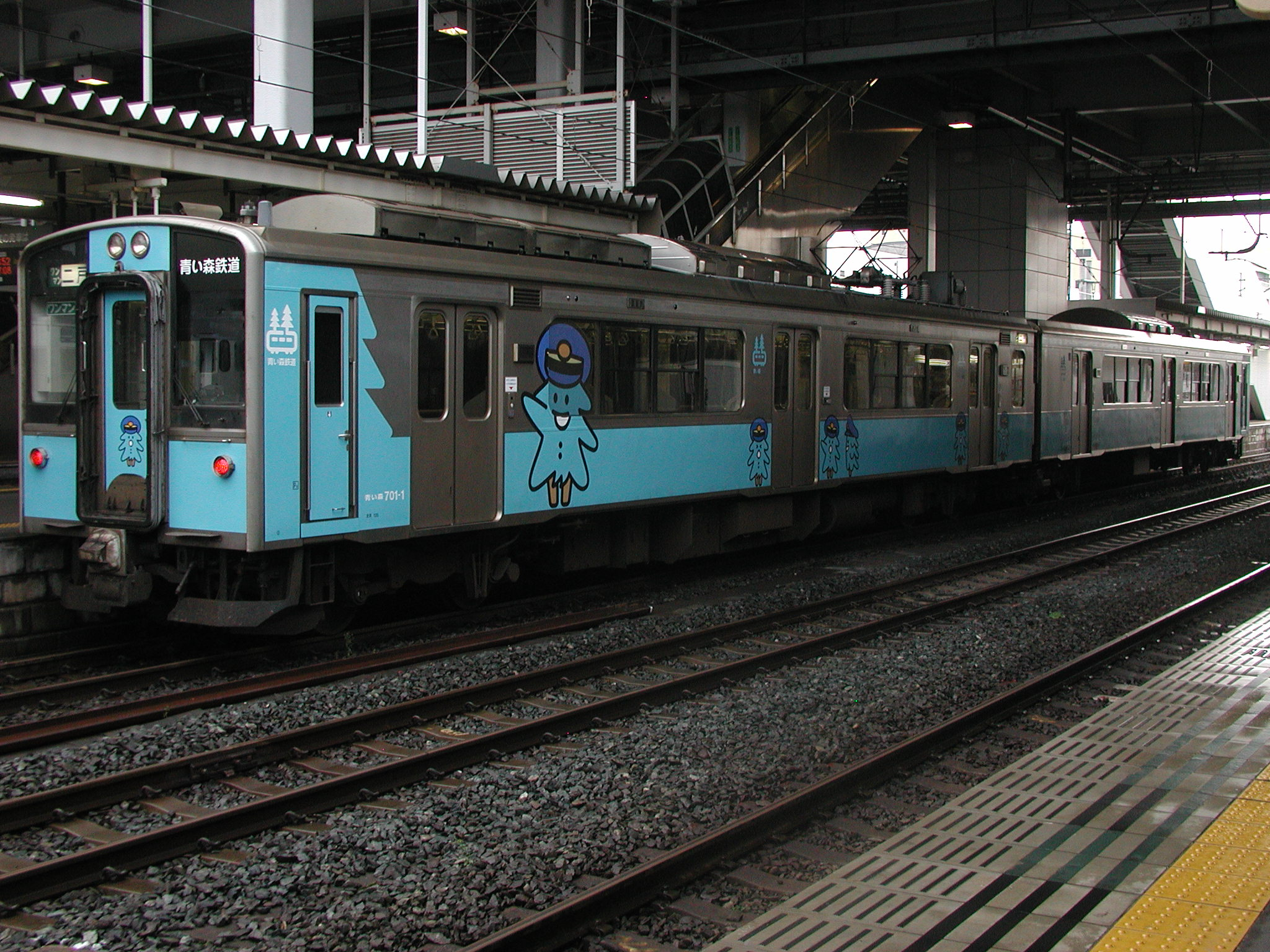
Aoimori 701 series EMU

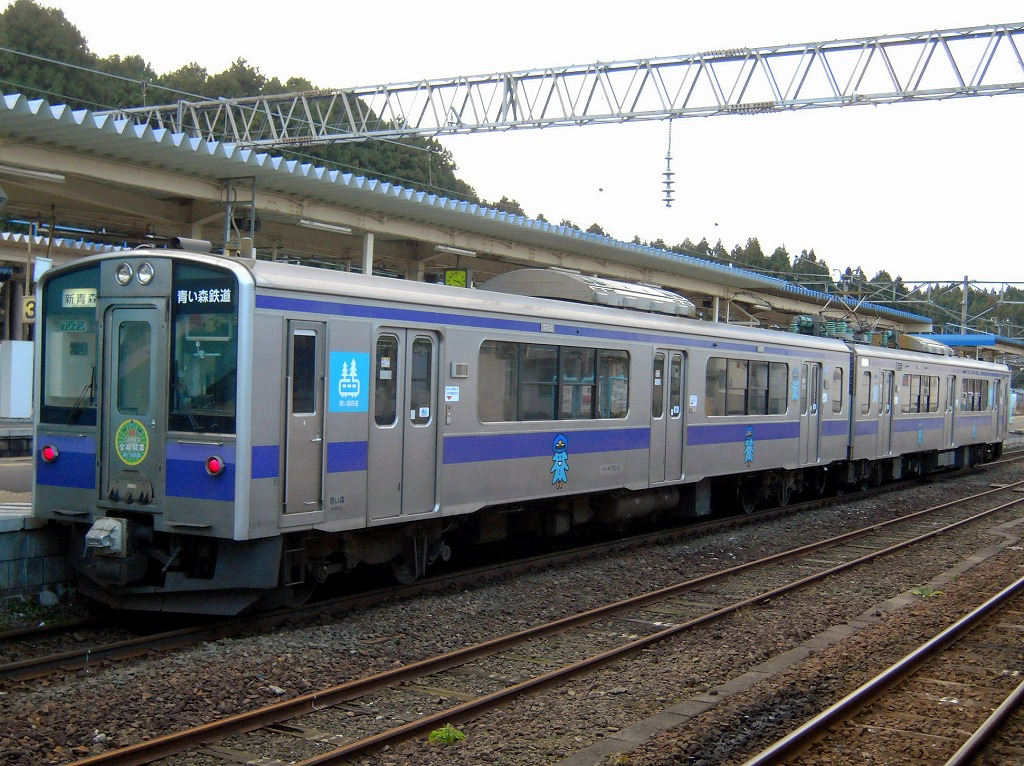
Aoimori 701 series EMU in its initial transitional livery

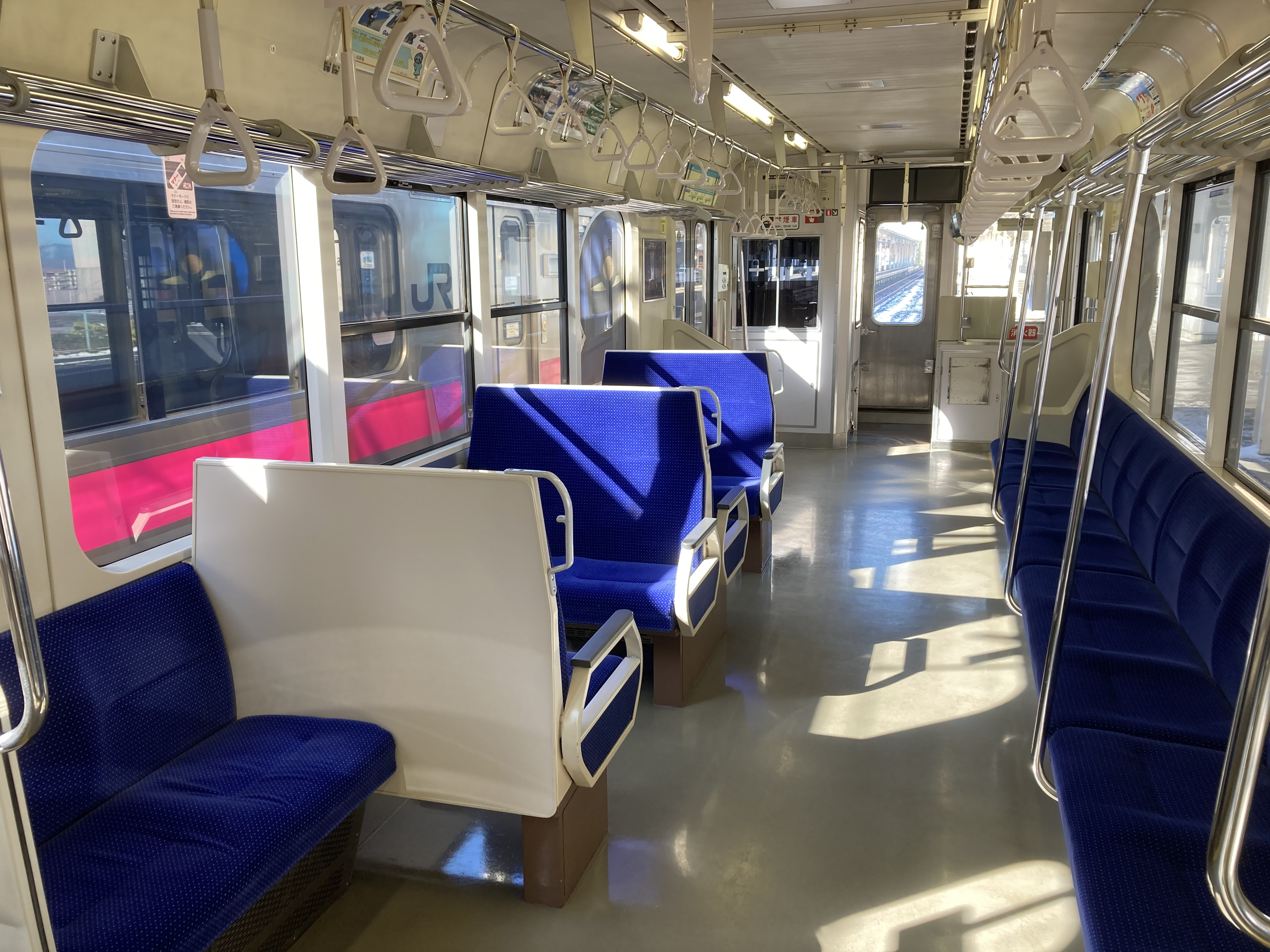
The interior of an Aoimori 701 series carriage

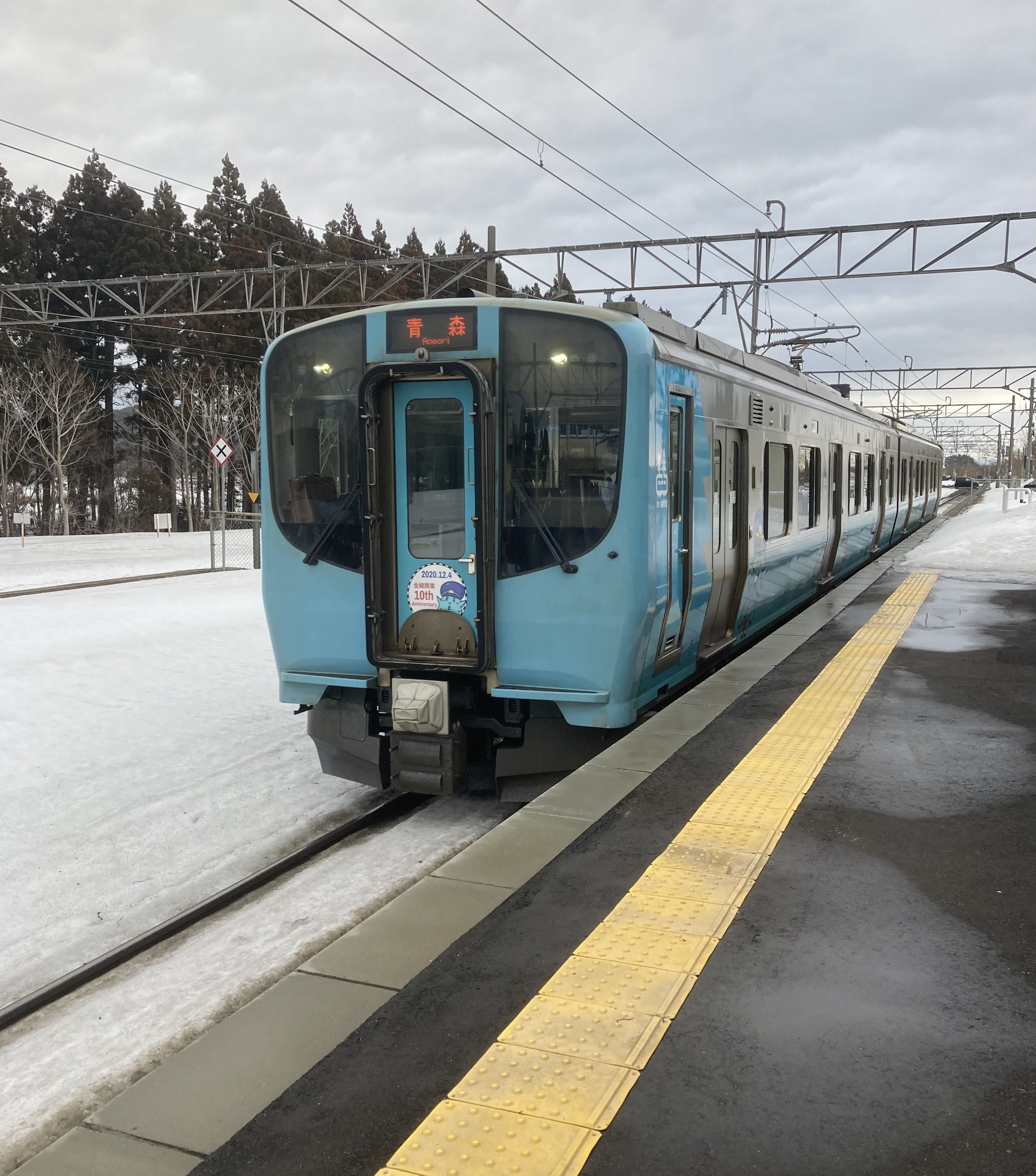
Aoimori 703 series EMU

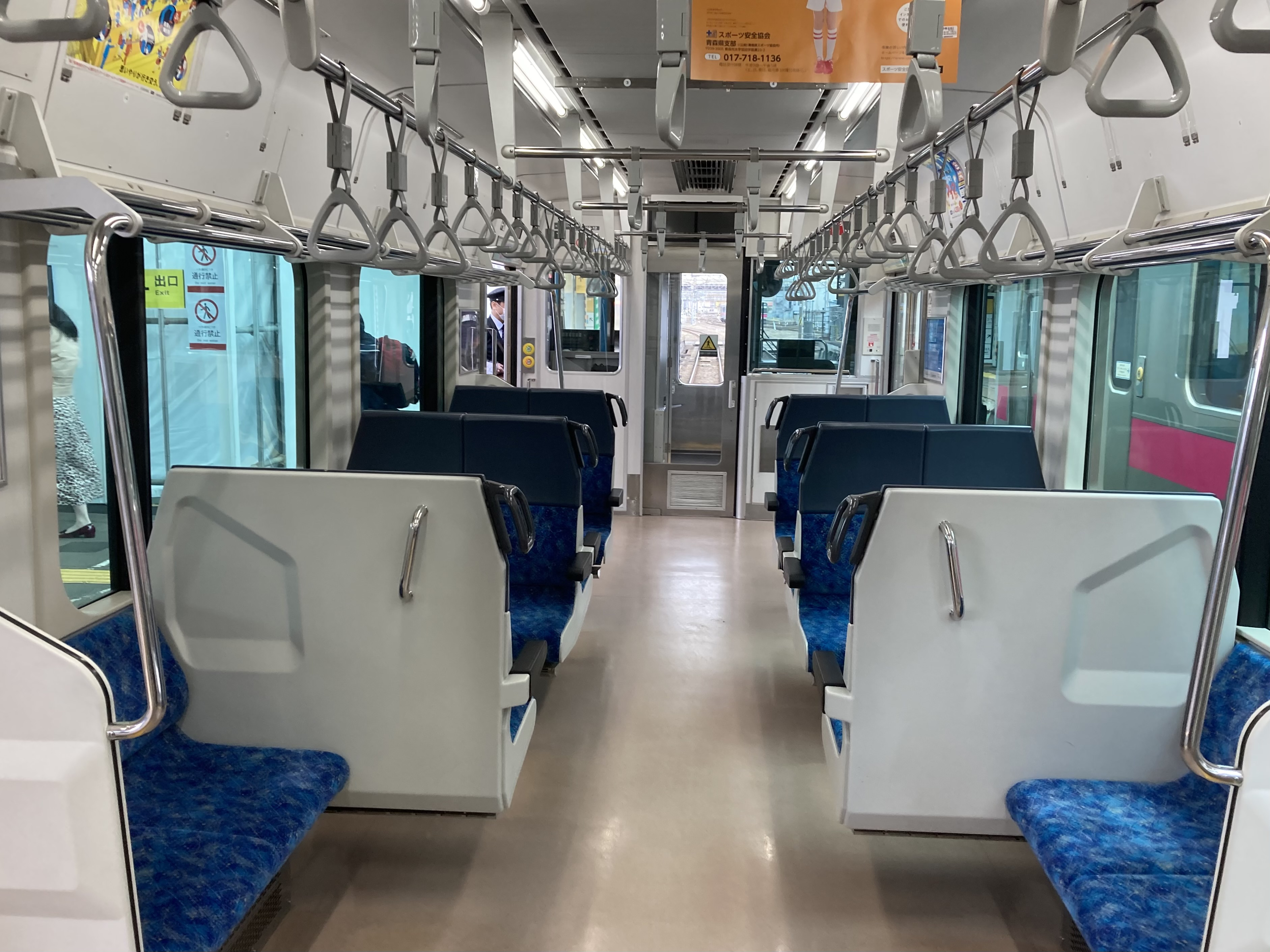
The interior of an Aoimori 703 series carriage

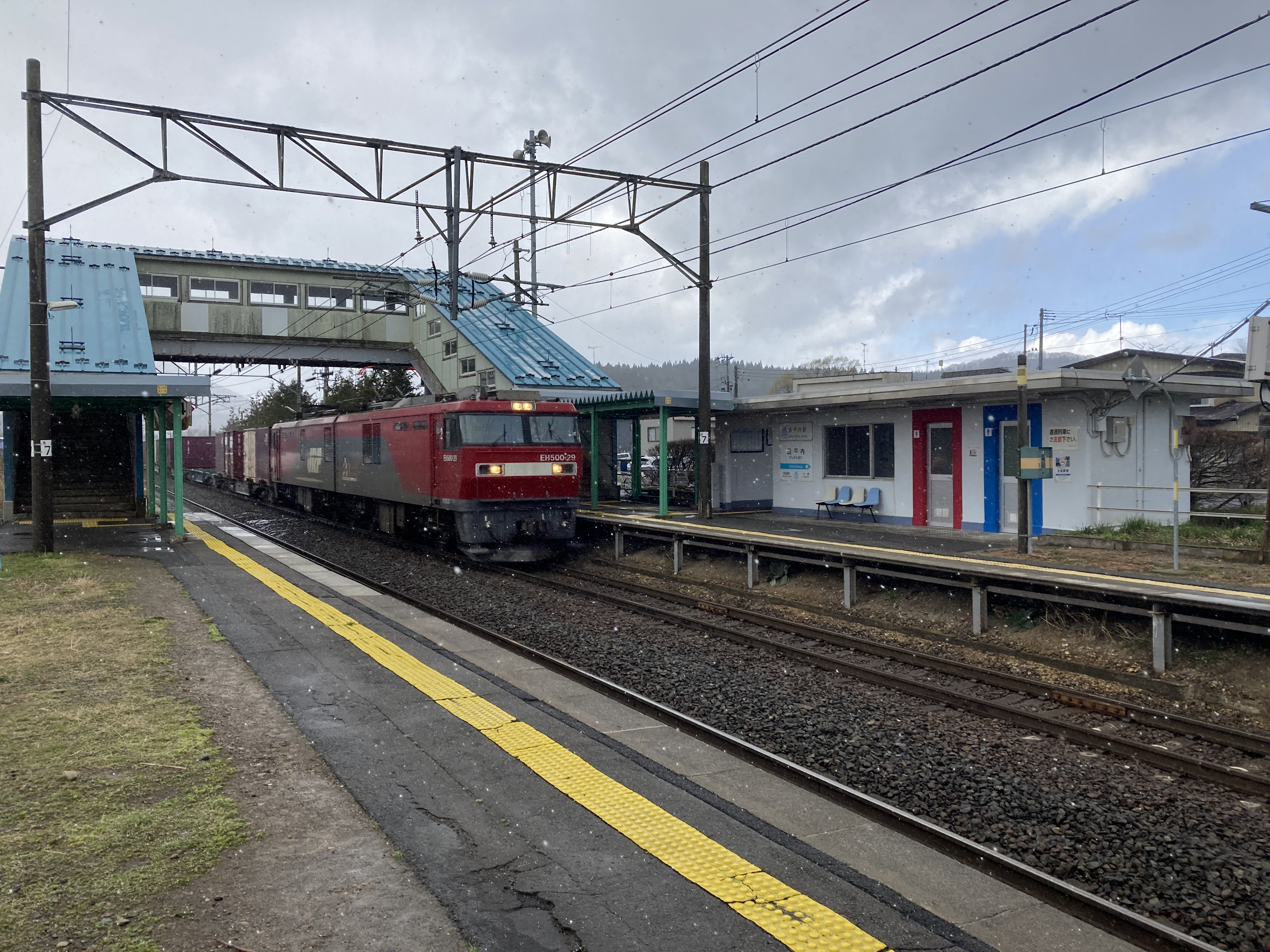
A JR Freight Class EH500 locomotive hauling freight through Nishi-Hiranai Station

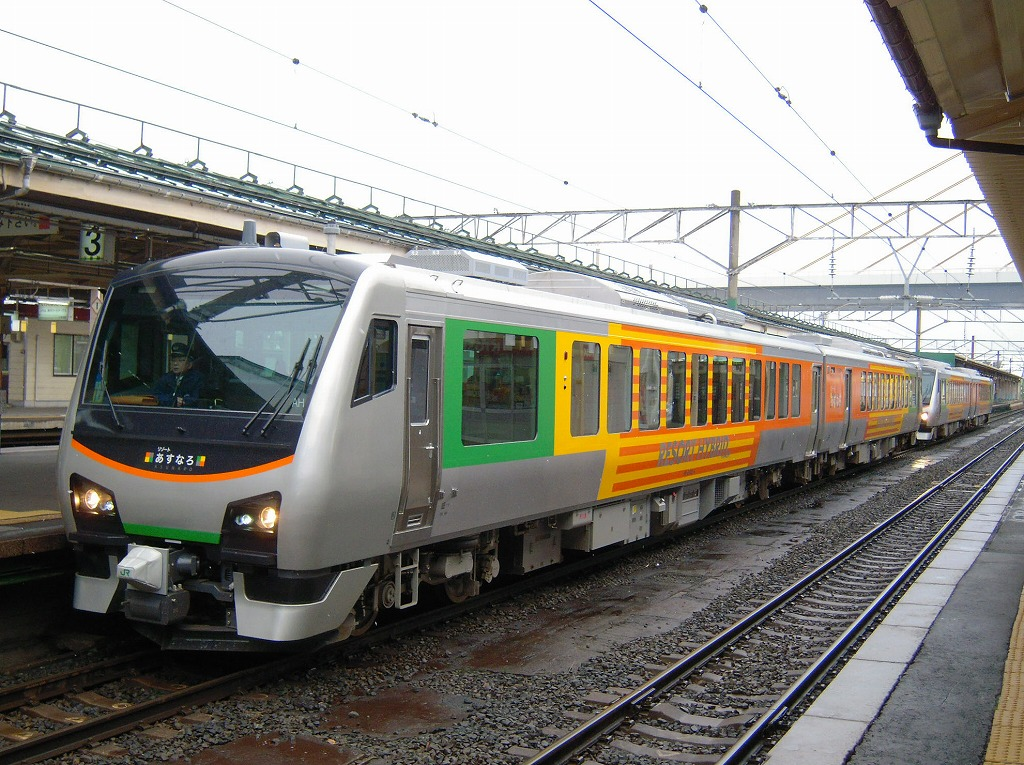
A Resort Asunaro HB-E300 series DMU

== Future plans ==
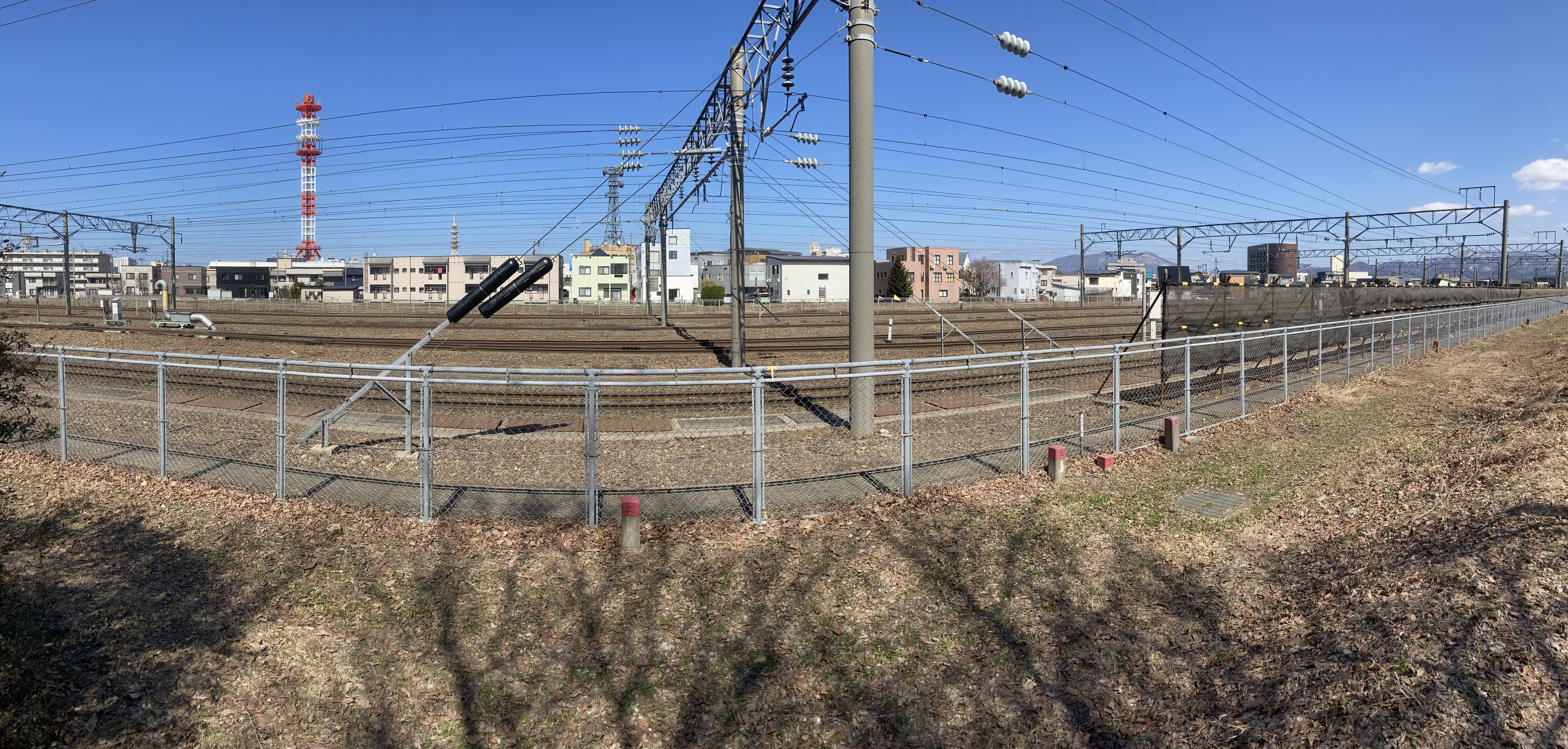
The site of the proposed station in April 2021.

The railway has been negotiating with the city of Aomori since December 2015 on a proposal to open a new station between Tsutsui Station and Aomori Station near the point at which the railway passes under Japan National Route 103. The station would be part of a sports arena development for the 2025 National Sports Festival of Japan to be held in Aomori. The neighborhood the station would serve is a primarily residential area, but it would also provide access to some busy shopping centers within walking distance to the station. As of January 2021, no final decision has been made regarding the construction of the new station.

== History ==
The predecessor to the Aoimori Railway Line was completed as the Metoki–Aomori portion of the Nippon Railway on 1 September 1891. When the Nippon Railway was nationalized on 1 November 1906, it became part of the Japanese National Railways (JNR) system and was designated part of the Tōhoku Main Line on 12 October 1909. With the privatization and dissolution of JNR on 1 April 1987, the line came under the control of East Japan Railway Company (JR East).

On 1 December 2002, with the opening of the Tōhoku Shinkansen, the portion of the Tōhoku Main Line located in Iwate Prefecture became the Iwate Galaxy Railway Line, and the portion in Aomori Prefecture from the Iwate border to Hachinohe Station became the Aoimori Railway Line. With the opening of the Tōhoku Shinkansen extension to Shin-Aomori on 4 December 2010, the Tōhoku Main Line tracks between Hachinohe and Aomori were transferred from JR East to Aoimori Railway Company, resulting in the completion of the Aoimori Railway Line.

Commencing in December 2010, coinciding with the opening of the Tōhoku Shinkansen to Shin-Aomori, JR East operated the Resort Asunaro sightseeing train between Hachinohe and Ōminato using the Aoimori Railway Line between Hachinohe and Noheji. The last service operated on 20 August 2023.

There have been a few new developments along the line since its transfer to Aoimori Railway Company. On 12 March 2012, Nonai Station was relocated 1.5 kilometers (0.93 mi) southwest of its original location. Tsutsui Station, near Aomori High School, was opened on 15 March 2014. Two-car Aoimori 703 series sets began operations on the line on the same day to handle the increased loads presented by the opening of Tsutsui Station.

== See also ==
- List of railway lines in Japan
