= Lake Ogawara =

Lake in Aomori Prefecture, Japan

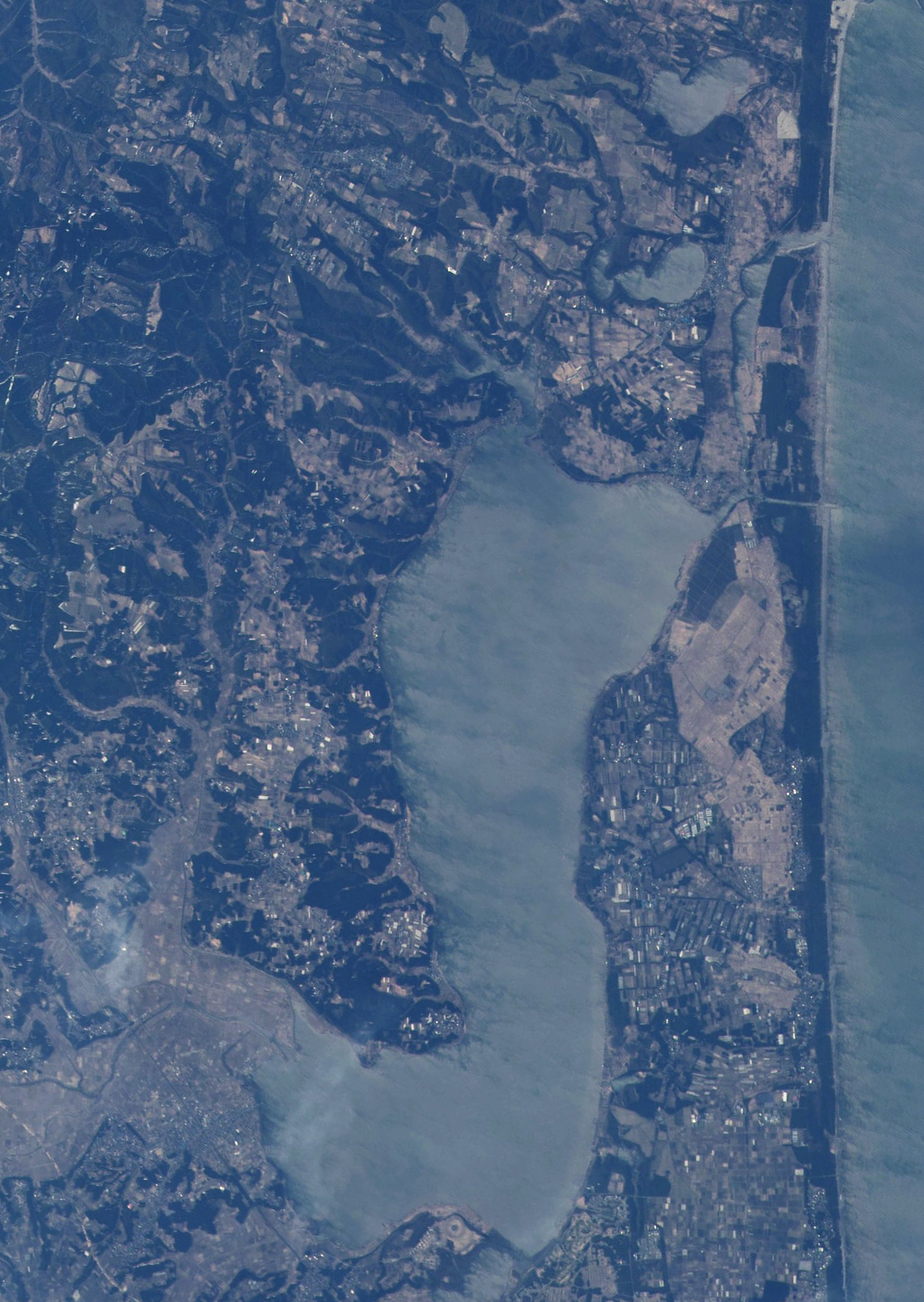
- Landsat image of Lake Ogawara

- Location within Aomori Prefecture
- Location: Aomori Prefecture
- Coordinates: 40°47′00″N 141°19′00″E
- Type: dimictic lake
- Primary outflows: Pacific Ocean
- Basin countries: Japan
- Surface area: 63.2 km^{2} (24.4 sq mi)
- Average depth: 11 m (36 ft)
- Max. depth: 25 m (82 ft)
- Water volume: 0.714 km^{3} (579,000 acre⋅ft)
- Residence time: 0.8 years
- Shore length^{1}: 67.4 km (41.9 mi)
- Surface elevation: 0 m (0 ft)
- Frozen: December to March
- ^{1} Shore length is not a well-defined measure.

Lake Ogawara (小川原湖, Ogawarako) is Japan's eleventh largest lake (by area) and the largest in Aomori Prefecture. It spans the boundaries of the city of Misawa, the town of Tōhoku, and the village of Rokkasho in Kamikita District.

== Data ==
The lake has an area of 63.2 square kilometers (24.4 mi^{2}) and holds 0.714 cubic kilometers (0.171 mi^{3}) of water. Its circumference is 67.4 kilometers (41.9 mi). At its deepest point, the water is 25 meters (82 ft) deep, with an average depth of 11 meters (36 ft). The surface is at sea level. The lake is shallow (less than 2 meters (6.6 ft) deep) from the shoreline to a distance of approximately 200 meters (660 ft), whereupon the depth drops off precipitously. The edge of Lake Ogawara is very near the coast of the Pacific Ocean, and the sand bar guarding its mouth has been breached numerous times by storms and typhoons, thus accounting for the brackish water of the lake. There are four inflowing rivers, all coming from the Hakkōda Mountains. The only outflow is the Takase River, which drains the lake to the Pacific Ocean.

== History ==
Lake Ogawara was originally a marine bay, which became a lake approximately 3,000 years ago by the formation of a sand bar at its mouth. The shoreline around Lake Ogawara has been settled since prehistoric times, and numerous Jōmon period remains and shell middens have been discovered, most notably at the Futatsumori Site on the west bank of the lake.

The lake was used by the Imperial Japanese Navy Air Service units at Misawa Airfield to practice for the attack on Pearl Harbor during World War II due to its similarity in depth to Pearl Harbor in Hawaii.

The Japanese government initiated a project beginning in the 1970s to convert the lake from brackish to fresh water to serve as a source of drinking, industrial and irrigation water despite the adverse environmental impact.

On February 20, 2018, an F-16 of the US Air Force based at the nearby Misawa Air Base jettisoned two external fuel tanks into the lake after experiencing an engine fire. Tests conducted in March 2018 found no residual fuel in the lake following a cleanup effort by the Japan Maritime Self-Defense Force. Fishermen were given 85,000,000 yen (about $800,000) in a joint payment from the US and Japanese governments for loses incurred while the lake was closed to fishing during the cleanup efforts.

== Environment ==
Lake Ogawara is an abundant habitat for fish and birds, and is recognized as such by the Japanese Ministry of the Environment. A variety of marimo occurs naturally in the lake.

In 1996 the sound of wild birds on the shores of Lake Ogawara was selected by the Ministry of the Environment as one of the 100 Soundscapes of Japan.

In 2002, the Ministry of the Environment classified Lake Ogawara to be one of the 500 Important Wetlands in Japan, particularly for its biodiversity of aquatic flora, insects, and freshwater shellfish. The lake also serves as a habitat for migratory wildfowl.

The lake was previously home to the critically endangered Hucho perryi, which was last spotted in 1943. Migratory birds include the whooper swan and tundra swan, among others.

== Economic activity ==
The lake is a commercial source of cultivated Japanese smelt, icefish, goby and shijimi.

== Sources ==
This article incorporates material from the article 小川原湖 (Ogawarako) in the Japanese Wikipedia, retrieved on November 11, 2009.
