= Aoimori Railway Company =

Japanese regional railway company

- Native name: 青い森鉄道株式会社
- Type: Public-private (kabushiki gaisha)
- Industry: Rail transport
- Predecessor: East Japan Railway Company (JR East)
- Founded: 25 May 2001
- Headquarters: Aomori, Japan
- Owner: Aomori Prefecture (68.8%); Aomori Municipal Government (7.63%); Hachinohe Municipal Government (6.52%); Japan Freight Railway Company (3.45%); Tokyo Small and Medium Business Investment & Consultation Company (1.72%)
- Website: aoimorirailway.com

Aoimori Railway Company (青い森鉄道株式会社, Aoimori Tetsudō Kabushiki-gaisha) is a third-sector railway company that operates the Aoimori Railway Line in Aomori Prefecture, Japan. Its headquarters are located in the city of Aomori. The government of Aomori Prefecture and the city of Aomori are the primary shareholders of the company.

The railway facilities and tracks are owned by the prefectural government of Aomori as a "Category 3 Railway Business" under the Railway Business Act of Japan. Aoimori Railway Company leases these facilities from the prefectural government and is responsible for operation of passenger trains on the tracks. This scheme is intended to mitigate the company's burden as an owner of fixed assets and is known as "track/service separation" (上下分離方式, jōge bunri hōshiki).

== Line ==
- Aoimori Railway Line

== History ==
Aoimori Railway Company was founded on 25 May 2001. Following the beginning of Tōhoku Shinkansen services between Morioka Station and Hachinohe Station on 1 December 2002, the company began operating services along the former Tōhoku Main Line – the corresponding section of which was subsequently renamed as the Aoimori Railway Line – between Metoki Station and Hachinohe Station. When the shinkansen was extended north from Hachinohe to Shin-Aomori Station on 4 December 2010, the company assumed control of the bypassed section of the Tōhoku Main Line between Hachinohe Station and Aomori Station and added it to the Aoimori Railway Line.

== Mascot ==
Referencing the literal meaning of its Japanese name, Aoimori Railway's mascot is named Mōrī ("Molly"), an anthropomorphic blue tree.
