= Natsudomari Peninsula =

Peninsula in Aomori Prefecture, Japan

Natsudomari Peninsula 夏泊半島
- Peninsula
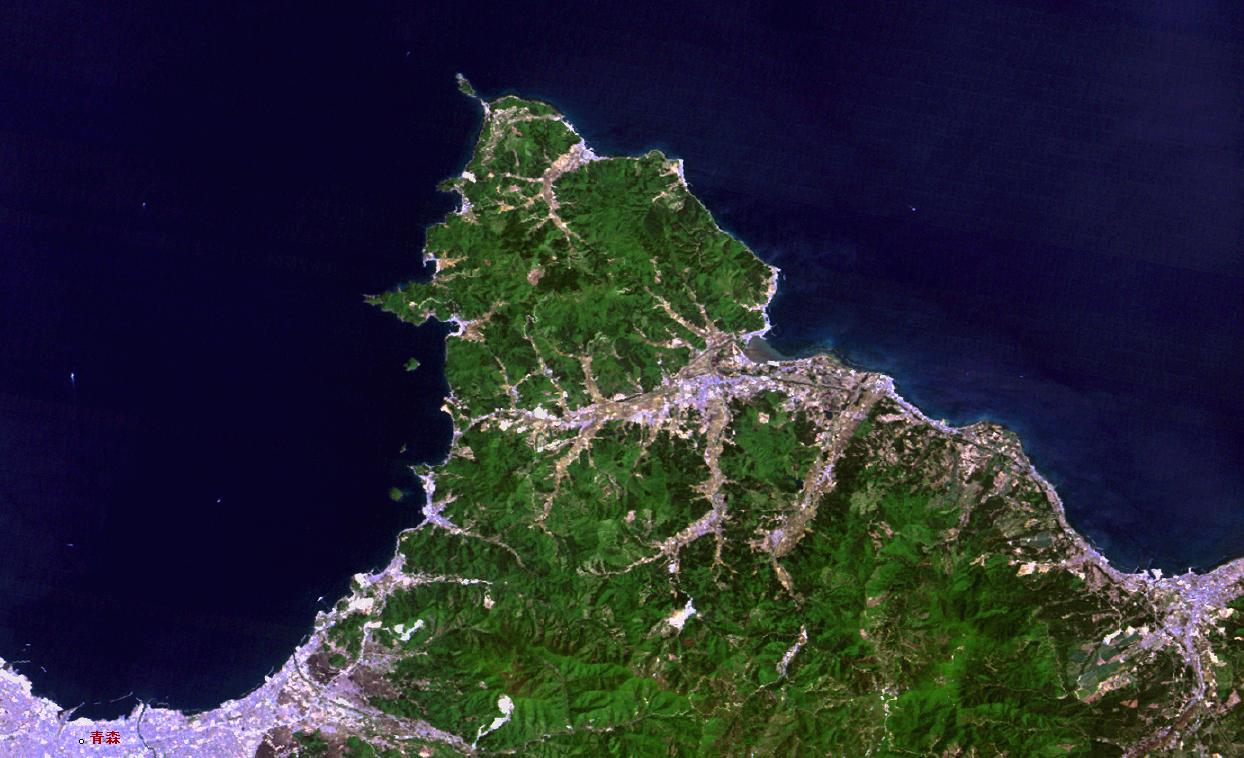
- Landsat image of Natsudomari Peninsula

- Location within Aomori Prefecture Location within Japan
- Coordinates: 40.9103°N 140.9652°E
- Location: Aomori Prefecture, Japan
- Part of: Hiranai, Aomori

Area
  - Total: Appx. 100 square kilometres (39 sq mi)

The Natsudomari Peninsula (Japanese: 夏泊半島(なつどまりはんとう), Hepburn: Natsudomari-hantō) is a peninsula on the northern end of the Japanese island, Honshū, that stretches north into Mutsu Bay. Administratively the area is a part of Aomori Prefecture, and the bulk of the area falls within the jurisdiction of the town of Hiranai, with Aomori city on the western periphery of the landform. The peninsula has several small fishing communities scattered around the coastline, but most of the area's people live in the river valley that demarcates the southern boundary of the peninsula. The peninsula is notably an attractive nesting place for Siberian tundra swan.

== Geography ==
The Natsudomari Peninsula is bordered by Mutsu Bay to the east and north and Aomori Bay to the west. The peninsula is connected to the mainland of Honshū to the south. The Ōu Mountain Range begins on the peninsula and continues to the Nasu Mountains at the northern boundary of the Kantō region. The peninsula lies near the geographic center of Aomori Prefecture, the northernmost prefecture of the main Japanese island, Honshū.

== Geology ==
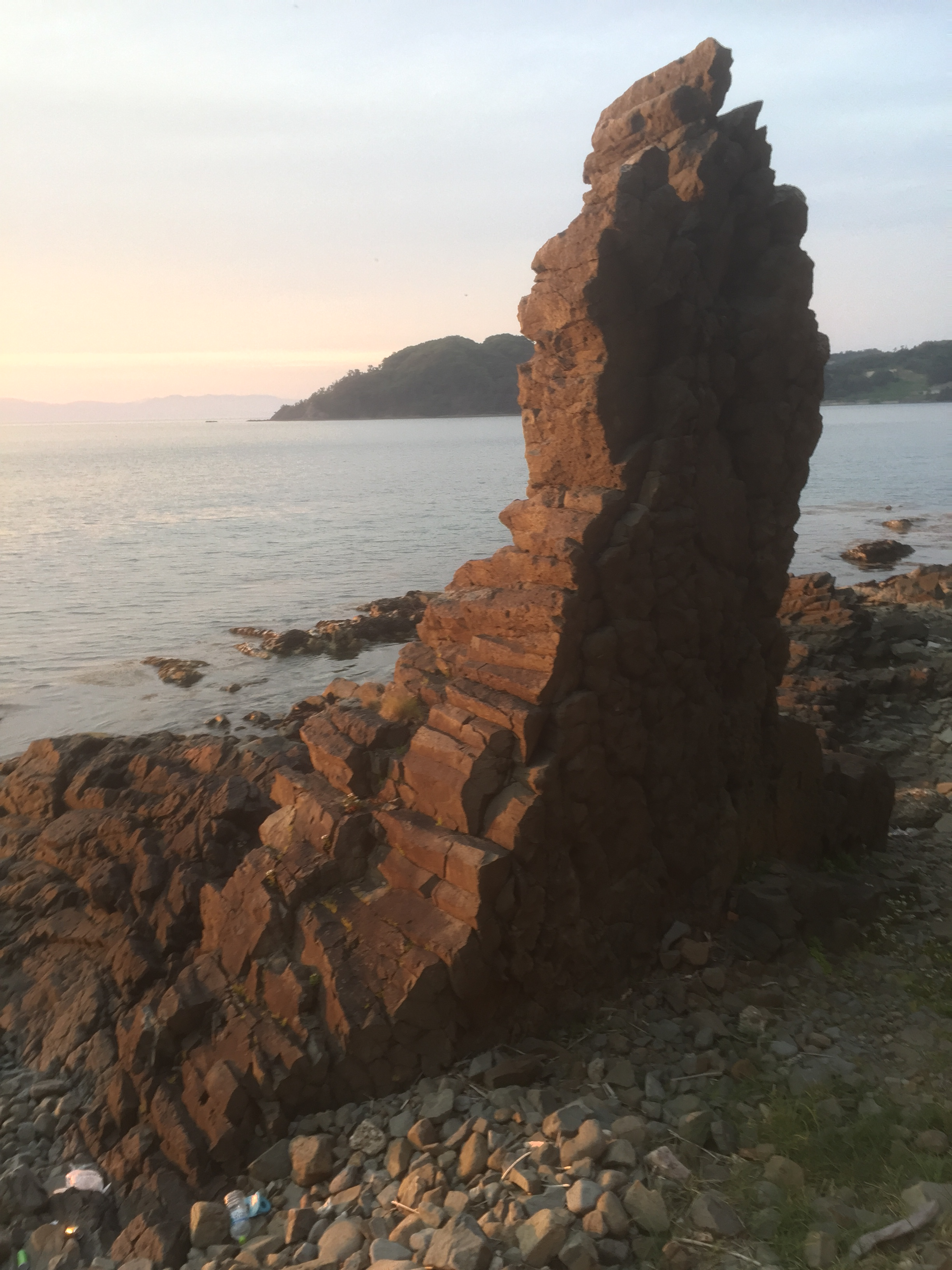
Bettō Stone, a magmatic dike on the west coast of Natsudomari Peninsula

The oldest rock found on the Natsudomari Peninsula can be found exposed on Mount Higashidake, south-southeast of Asamushi Onsen. The mountain's rock is granodiorite that was formed during the Callovian. The second oldest rock is a mixture of Late Jurassic chert and limestone known as the Tateishi Formation. The Tateishi Formation can be seen along the peninsula's east coast. These two formations make up the basement rock of the peninsula.

The next layers of rock seen on the peninsula formed during the Miocene. These layers include andesite, tuff breccia, and a system of sills and dikes left over from an extinct volcano that was centered at Mount Sasamori, a foothill of Mount Mizugasawa. The volcano's dikes can be seen along the west coast of the peninsula. Layers from the Quaternary are mainly made up of sedimentary deposits and tephra from Mount Iwaki.

Several faults run south-north along the peninsula, while one fault runs east-west along the valley floor in the middle of the peninsula. The exact location of many of the faults are obscured by either recent sediment deposits or human activity, while some of the north-south faults can be observed in the peninsula's mountainous areas.

== Notable places ==
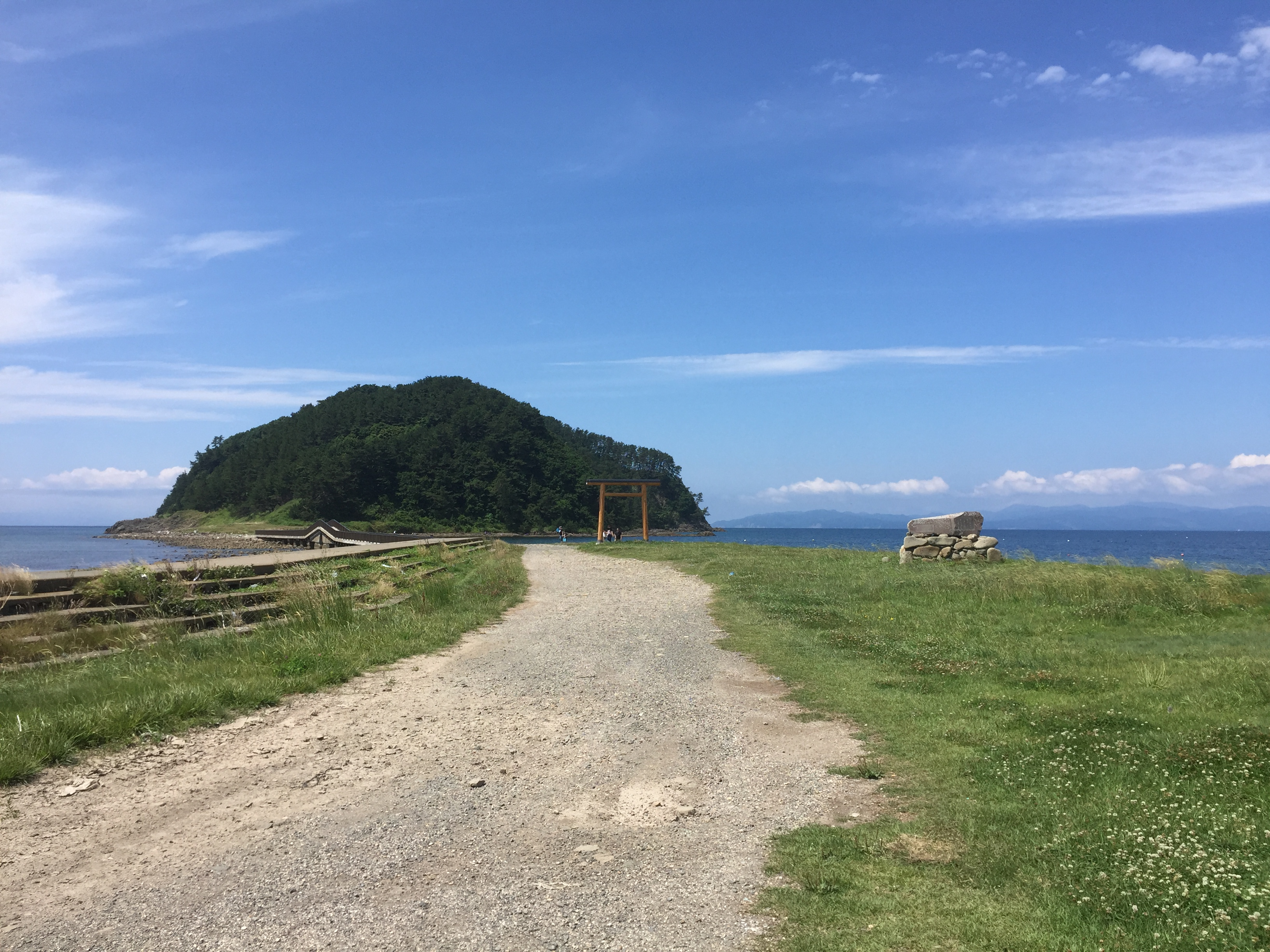
Ōshima Island, part of Asamushi-Natsudomari Prefectural Natural Park, from Natsudomari Peninsula.

Notable places in the Natsudomari Peninsula include :

- Asamushi-Natsudomari Prefectural Natural Park- a prefectural natural park that encompasses Asamushi Onsen and the coastline of the peninsula.
- Yogoshiyama Forest Park- a park run by the government of Hiranai that features skiing, onsen, gardens, and camping.
- Asamushi Onsen- an onsen town and that is sometimes known as "Atami in Tohoku".
- Kominato Swan Nesting Shallow Shore- an area on the eastern shore of the peninsula where many Tundra swans migrate from Siberia to during the winter.
- Ōshima- an island off the northern coast of the peninsula that is linked to it by a footbridge.
- Mount Mizugasawa - the highest mountain on the peninsula.

== Transportation ==
=== Railway ===
- Aoimori Railway Line
  - Asamushi-Onsen Station, Nishi-Hiranai Station, Kominato Station, Shimizugawa Station, Karibasawa Station

=== Highway ===
- National Route 4
- Aomori Prefecture Route 9 - a scenic road known also as the "Hotate Line" that travels around the edge of the peninsula.

=== Transit ===
- Hiranai Town Bus
- Aomori City Bus
