= Ōshima (Aomori) =

Island in Hiranai, Japan

大島
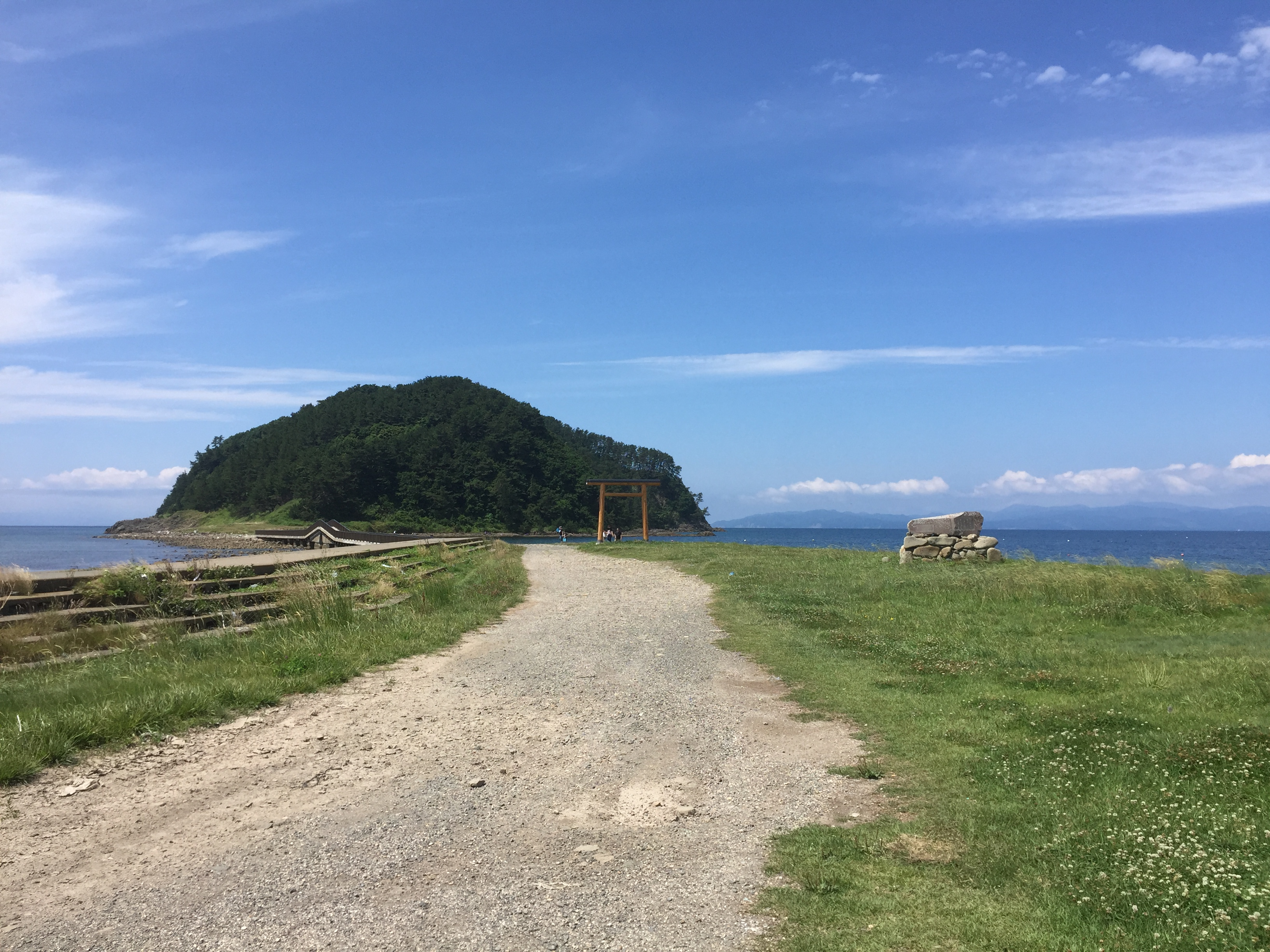
- Oshima Island as seen from Nastsudomari Peninsula

- Location within Aomori Prefecture

Geography
- Location: Mutsu Bay
- Coordinates: 41°0′47.4″N 140°52′27.1″E
- Area: 0.16 km^{2} (0.062 sq mi)
- Coastline: 3 km (1.9 mi)

Administration
- Japan
- Prefecture: Aomori Prefecture
- District: Higashitsugaru
- Municipality: Hiranai

Ōshima (Japanese: 大島(おおしま), Hepburn: Ōshima) is a rocky island off the northern coast of Natsudomari Peninsula in Mutsu Bay. The island is a part of Hiranai in Aomori Prefecture. The island has 3 km (1.9 mi) of coastline and an area of 0.16 km^{2} (0.062 sq mi). It is a part of the prefecture-maintained, Asamushi-Natsudomari Prefectural Natural Park.

== Geography ==
The island lies only 200 meters north of Natsudomari Peninsula in Mutsu Bay. It was once possible to walk from the island to the peninsula at low-tide, but erosion made this impossible over time.

The island is forested on its southern half, while its northern half is covered in grassland. The grassland was used for pastoral farming before the island was designated a natural park.

== Geology ==
Ōshima is a sill that was formed underground when a volcano dominated the landscape of Natsudomari Peninsula during the Miocene. The rock of the Ōshima sill is made up of dacite and rhyolite.

== History ==
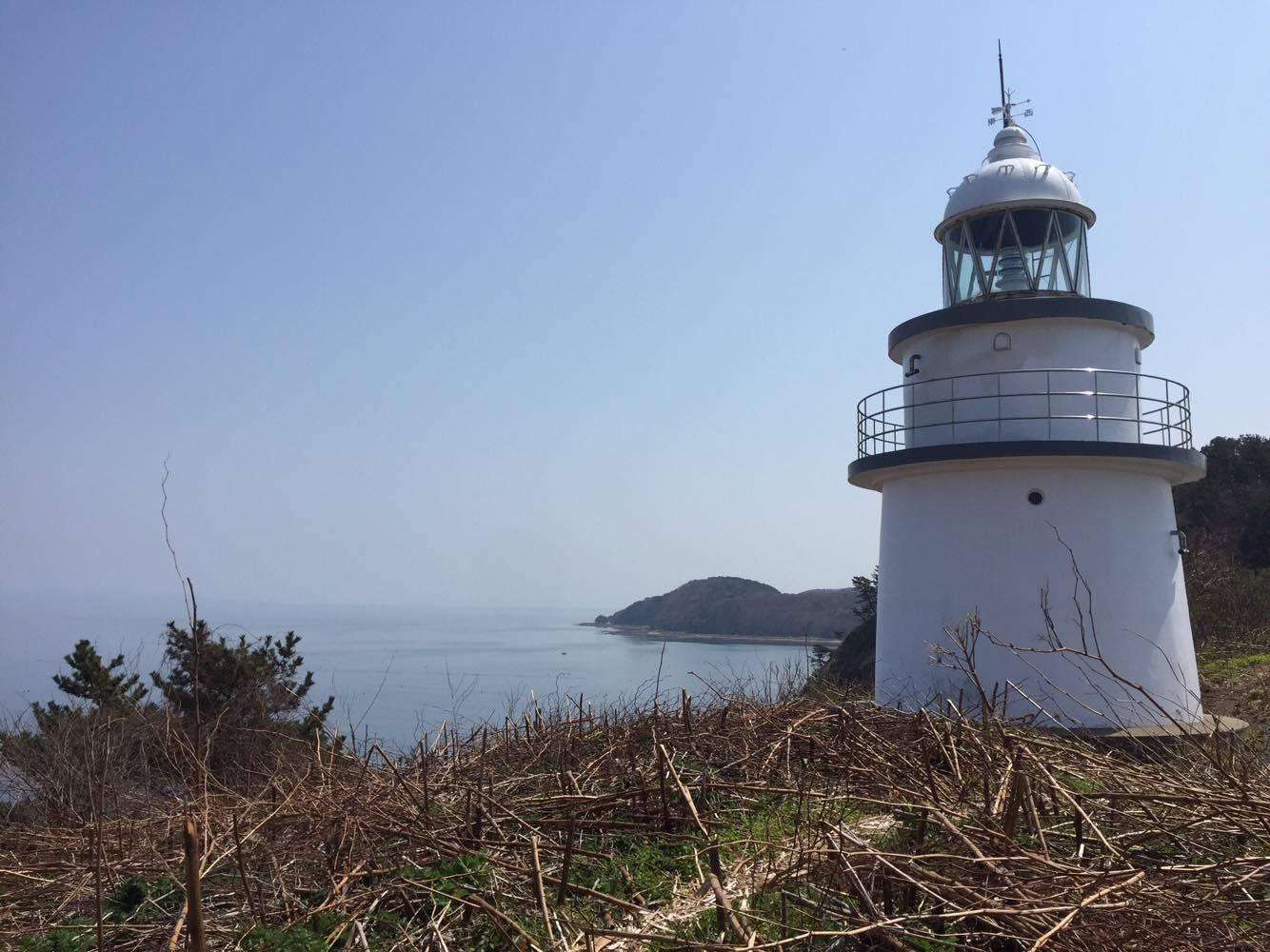
Ōshima lighthouse with Mutsu Bay in the background

During the time the Tsugaru clan ruled the area, the island was known as Ōmasaki (大間崎; 大 Ō "large", 間 ma "space", and 崎 saki "cape"), reflecting that it was viewed as a cape historically rather than an island due to being able to walk to the island during low-tide.

In May 1949, a lighthouse was built on the northern side of the island. The island was designated as a part of Asamushi-Natsudomari Prefectural Natural Park in June 1953.

== Access ==
No automobile traffic is allowed on Ōshima. There is a parking lot along Aomori Prefecture Route 9 and bus stop for the Hiranai Town Bus on the northern tip of Natsudomari Peninsula that serves the vicinity of the island. The island is accessible from the peninsula by a concrete footbridge that connects to a trail that spans the length of the island.
