= Eboshi-dake =

Eboshi-dake (Japanese 烏帽子岳, 'Eboshi peak', with Eboshi being a Japanese hat) is the name of several mountain peaks in Japan:

- Eboshi-dake (Akaishi-Gebirge), 2726m
- Eboshi-dake (Amakusa, Kumamoto), 170m
- Eboshi-dake (Amami-Ōshima), 364m
- Eboshi-dake (Aomori), 720m
- Eboshi-dake (Ashibetsu, Hokkaidō), 758m
- Eboshi-dake (Bungo-Ōno, Ōita), 821m
- Eboshi-dake (Echigo-Gebirge), 998m
- Eboshi-dake (Edakute-jima), 322m
- Eboshi-dake (Fujikawaguchiko, Yamanashi), 1257m
- Eboshi-dake (Gunma), 1182m
- Eboshi-dake (Hida-Gebirge), 2628m
- Eboshi-dake (Hida-Hochland), 1625m
- Eboshi-dake (Hokuto, Yamanashi), 2594m
- Eboshi-dake (Ibusuki/Minamikyūshū, Kagoshima), 363m
- Eboshi-dake (Iide-Bergland), 2018m
- Eboshi-dake (Imari, Saga), 596m
- Eboshi-dake (Isahaya, Nagasaki), 697m
- Eboshi-dake (Itoigawa, Niigata), 1451m
- Eboshi-dake (Iwakuni/Shūnan, Yamaguchi), 697m
- Eboshi-dake (Kadogawa, Miyazaki), 260m
- Eboshi-dake (Kagoshima, Kagoshima), 564m
- Eboshi-dake (Kamikawa, Hokkaidō), 2072m
- Eboshi-dake (Kirishima/Aira, Kagoshima), 703m
- Eboshi-dake (Kirishima, Kagoshima), 988m
- Eboshi-dake (Kiso/Asahi, Nagano), 1952m
- Eboshi-dake (Kiso-Gebirge), 2194m
- Eboshi-dake (Kuchinoshima), 234m
- Eboshi-dake (Kudamatsu/Shūnan, Yamaguchi), 412m
- Eboshi-dake (Minamiaizu, Fukushima), 1095m
- Eboshi-dake (Minamiaso, Kumamoto), 1337m
- Eboshi-dake (Mine, Yamaguchi), 395m
- Eboshi-dake (Murakami, Niigata), 489m
- Eboshi-dake (Nagasaki/Togitsu, Nagasaki), 413m
- Eboshi-dake (Nobeoka/Kadogawa, Miyazaki), 362m
- Eboshi-dake (Ōtate, Akita), 1133m
- Eboshi-dake (Saga, Saga), 281m
- Eboshi-dake (Saiki, Ōita), 641m
- Eboshi-dake (Saito/Nishimera, Miyazaki), 1126m
- Eboshi-dake (Sanjō, Niigata), 680m
- Eboshi-dake (Sapporo, Hokkaidō), 1109m
- Eboshi-dake (Sasebo, Nagasaki), 568m
- Eboshi-dake (Semboku, Akita), 1060m
- Eboshi-dake (Shūnan, Yamaguchi), 669m
- Eboshi-dake (Suzuka-Gebirge), 865m
- Eboshi-dake (Takachiho, Miyazaki), 809m
- Eboshi-dake (Taketa/Bungo-Ōno, Ōita), 731m
- Eboshi-dake (Tarumizu, Kagoshima), 390m
- Eboshi-dake (Tsushima, Nagasaki), 176m
- Eboshi-dake (Ueda/Tōmi, Nagano), 2066m
- Eboshi-dake (Yakushima), 1614m
- Eboshi-dake (Yamanouchi, Nagano), 2230m
- Eboshi-dake (Yatsushiro, Kumamoto), 1692m
- Eboshi-dake (Yufu, Ōita), 761m

== See also ==
- Eboshi-yama (disambiguation)
