= Nishi-Hiranai Station =

Railway station in Hiranai, Aomori Prefecture, Japan

Nishi-Hiranai Station 西平内駅
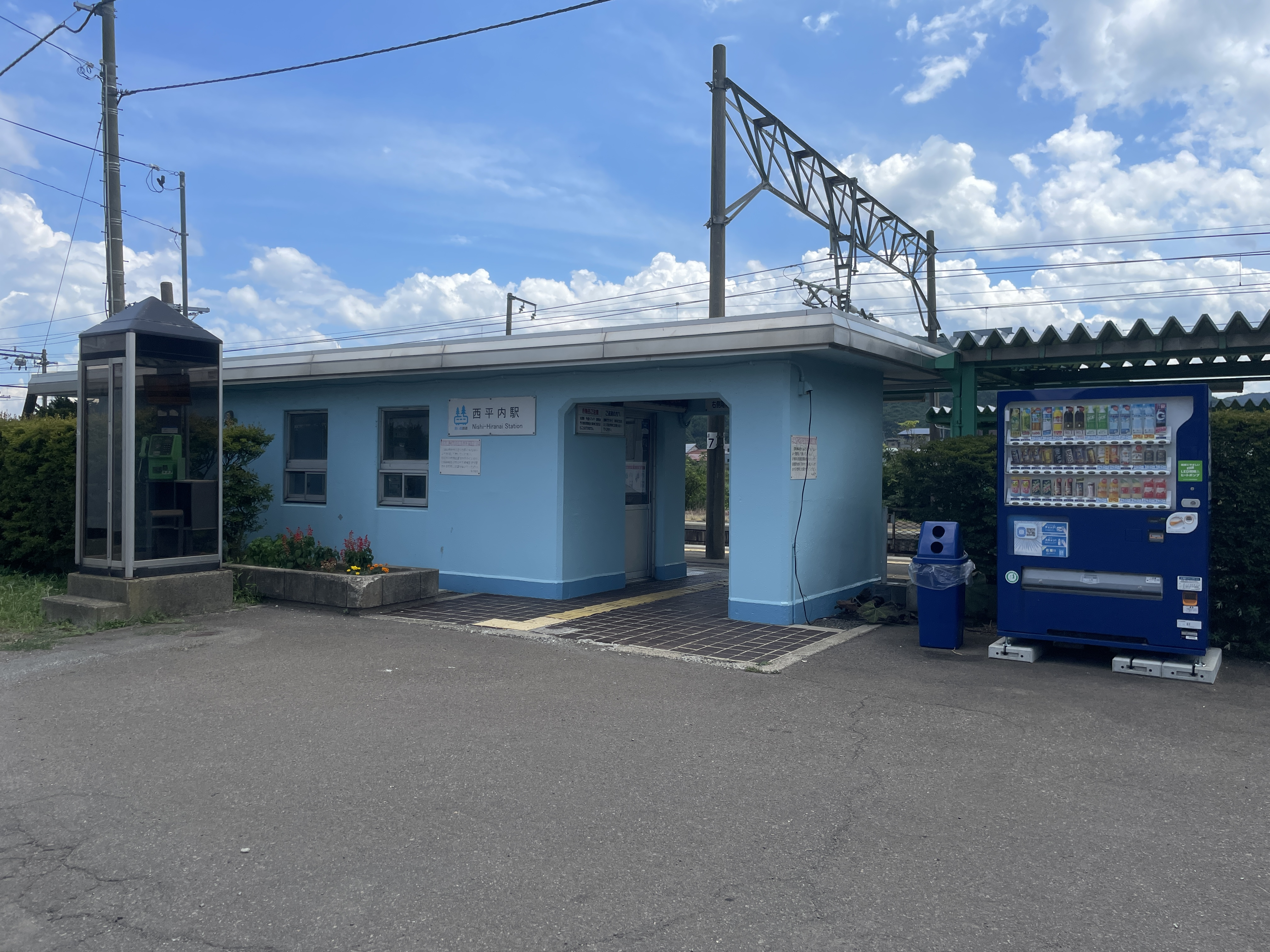
- Nishi-Hiranai Station in August 2023

General information
- Location: Azukisawa, Hiranai, Higashitsugaru District, Aomori Prefecture 039-3364; Japan
- Coordinates: 40°55′5.30″N 140°54′47.33″E
- System: Regional rail station
- Operator: Aoimori Railway
- Line: ■ Aoimori Railway Line
- Distance: 98.3 km from Metoki
- Platforms: 2 side platforms

Other information
- Status: Unstaffed
- Website: Official website

History
- Opened: 1 October 1939

Services
Preceding station	Aoimori Railway	Following station
Kominato towards Metoki	Aoimori Railway Line	Asamushi-Onsen towards Aomori
Location
- Location within Aomori Prefecture Location within Japan

Nishi-Hiranai Station (西平内駅, Nishi-Hiranai-eki) is a railway station located in the western part of the town of Hiranai in Aomori Prefecture, Japan. The station has been operating since 1939. Since 2010, the station has been operated by the Aoimori Railway Company, a third sector, regional rail operator. It is the third busiest railway station in Hiranai. Passenger trains serve the station just under 17 hours a day; the departure time between trains is roughly 30 minutes during the morning peak with reduced frequency at other times. The station also serves as a bus station for Shimokita Kōtsu, with local bus routes connecting the station and the community in its vicinity to communities throughout the town.

== Location ==
Nishi-Hiranai Station is located at the northern terminus of Aomori Prefecture Route 206, a 538-meter-long (1,765 ft) road that provides access to the station from Japan National Route 4 in the west side of Hiranai. The station is situated between two populated areas located in the western side of Hiranai. The station is 98.3 kilometers from the terminus of the Aoimori Railway Line at Metoki Station. It is 715.6 kilometers from Tokyo. The stations adjacent to Nishi-Hiranai Station along the Aoimori Railway Line are Kominato Station and Asamushi-Onsen Station.

== Station layout ==
Nishi-Hiranai Station has two unnumbered opposed side platforms, connected the station building by a footbridge. The station is unattended.

=== Platforms ===
Station side	■ Aoimori Railway Line	for Misawa and Hachinohe
Opposite side	■ Aoimori Railway Line	for Aomori

== History ==
Nishi-Hiranai Station was opened on 1 October 1939 as a station on the Tōhoku Main Line of the Japanese Government Railways (JGR), the pre-war predecessor to the Japan National Railways (JNR). The station was installed to provide access to a nearby sanatorium for disabled veterans. Regularly scheduled freight services were discontinued in November 1961. The concrete elevated footbridge at the station was installed on 1 January 1969. The station has been unattended since August 1970. With the privatization of the JNR on 1 April 1987, it came under the operational control of East Japan Railway Company (JR East). The section of the Tōhoku Main Line including this station was transferred to Aoimori Railway on 4 December 2010.

== Services ==
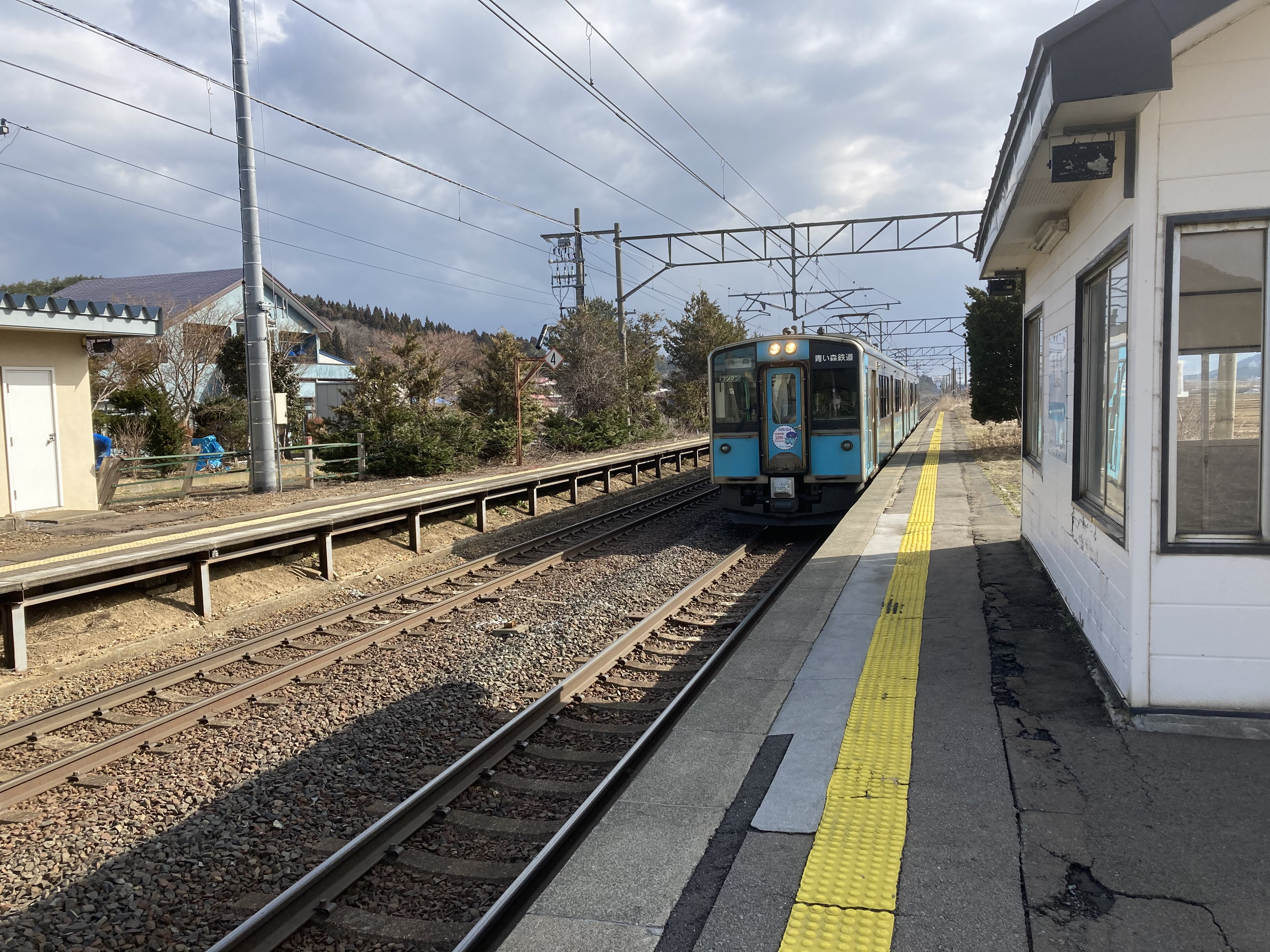
An Aomori-bound Aoimori 701 series set arriving at Nishi-Hiranai Station

The station is only served by trains operating on a local services between Aomori and Hachinohe operated by the Aoimori Railway. Passenger trains serve Nishi-Hiranai Station just under 17 hours a day from 6:38 am to 11:25 pm. At peak hours between the first train and 9:10 am trains depart from the station roughly every 30 minutes; otherwise trains depart at an approximate hourly basis. In 2018, a daily average of 142 passengers boarded trains at Nishi-Hiranai Station, an increase from the daily average of 109 passengers the station served in 2011. In 2018 the station was the seventeenth busiest on the Aoimori Railway Line, excluding Aomori and Hachinohe stations, and the third busiest along the rail line in Hiranai.

=== Bus services ===
Nishi-Hiranai Station also functions as a bus station, with three municipal bus lines stopping at the station. Shimokita Kōtsu operates the bus routes that stop at the station, traveling to points within Hiranai including Moura, Inaoi, Hiranai Town Hall, Shimizugawa, and Karibasawa, as well as providing a connection to the Aomori City Bus at Asamushi Onsen.

== See also ==
- List of railway stations in Japan
