= The Life of Chikuzan =

1977 Japanese film

- Film poster
- Directed by: Kaneto Shindō
- Written by: Kaneto Shindō
- Produced by: Susumu Takashima; Sadaki Sato; Setsuo Noto; Gakubun Akashi
- Starring: Takahashi Chikuzan
- Cinematography: Kiyomi Kuroda
- Edited by: Mitsuo Kondo
- Music by: Hikaru Hayashi
- Production companies: Kindai Eiga Kyōkai; Jean-Jean
- Release date: 17 March 1977 (Japan)
- Running time: 125 minutes
- Country: Japan
- Language: Japanese

The Life of Chikuzan (Japanese: 竹山ひとり旅, Hepburn: Chikuzan hitori tabi) is a 1977 Japanese biographical drama film written and directed by Kaneto Shindō. It is based on the life of shamisen player Takahashi Chikuzan.

== Plot ==
The real Chikuzan appears on a stage in a small theatre, Shibuya Jean-Jean, and begins telling the story of his life. The scene changes to his childhood. Sadazo (Chikuzan's real name) becomes partially blind due to illness at the age of three. Growing up he is bullied. His mother Toyo (Nobuko Otowa) buys him a shamisen and apprentices him to a blind bosama, a begging shamisen player. He finds that although his teacher begs, cajoles and wheedles, pleading poverty, the teacher is actually rich.

After training he sets off and works as a begging shamisen player. He meets various people on his travels around Tohoku and Hokkaido, living hand to mouth. One man is a thief who becomes a tinker (Takuzo Kawatani). Another man (Taiji Tonoyama) is a dancer who travels with him, busking and sleeping on beaches. His mother Toyo arranges a marriage to a blind woman who travels with him. After she is raped she leaves him. He falls in with two confidence tricksters, first selling candy which they say will prevent bedwetting, then fake eyedrops. They are put in prison. He has a relationship with one of the tricksters, Tomiko (Hiroko Isayama), who leaves him.

He is married again to his second wife, who already has a child, and leaves on his travels. An elderly woman takes him with her group of performers to teach him the shamisen. During the trip she becomes ill and Sadazo takes her place. At this time, his wife's child sickens and eventually dies, but the urgent telegrams to Sadazo are discarded by the other performers because they do not want him to leave. Sadazo returns during the child's funeral and is set upon by his mother.

At the advice of his wife, Sadazo attends a braille school. A teacher gets a student pregnant, and lies to Sadazo to make him and his wife take care of the girl. Sadazo runs away in shame at being tricked. After searching for many days, Sadazo is found by his wife and mother. At the end of the film, he meets his future teacher, Narita Unchiku (Kei Satō).

== Cast ==
- Takahashi Chikuzan as himself
- Ryuzo Hayashi as Sadazo (Chikuzan)
- Nobuko Otowa as Toyo, Sadazo's mother
- Mitsuko Baisho as the second wife
- Taiji Tonoyama
- Junkichi Orimoto
- Rokko Toura as Hikoichi
- Hiroko Isayama as Tomiko
- Kei Satō as Narita Unchiku
- Takuzo Kawatani

== Production ==
The film is based on Takahashi Chikuzan's autobiography Tsugaru jamisen hitori tabi. It was produced by Shindō's production company Kindai Eiga Kyokai and Chikuzan's company "Jean-Jean".

== Release ==
The film was Japan's entry at the 10th Moscow International Film Festival in July 1977. Takahashi Chikuzan made his first trip outside Japan to attend the film festival with director Shindō, and also did his first performance outside Japan.

== Legacy ==
The Life of Chikuzan was screened at a 2012 retrospective on Shindō and Kōzaburō Yoshimura in London, organised by the British Film Institute and the Japan Foundation.
