= Kominato =

Kominato may refer to:

- Kominato, Aomori, a former municipality in Hiranai, Aomori Prefecture, Japan
- Kominato, Chiba, a former municipality in Kamogawa, Chiba Prefecture, Japan
- Kominato Line, a private railway line in Chiba Prefecture, Japan
- Siaogang District, known as Kominato during Japanese rule of Taiwan, in Kaohsiung, Taiwan
