= Mount Mizugasawa =

Mountain in Japan

- Location within Aomori Prefecture

Highest point
- Elevation: 323.4 m (1,061 ft)
- Coordinates: 40°57′9.6″N 140°54′56.9″E

Naming
- Native name: 水ヶ沢山 (Mizugasawa-yama)

Geography
- Location: Hiranai, Aomori, Japan
- Parent range: Ōu Mountains

Climbing
- Easiest route: road, footpath

Mount Mizugasawa (水ヶ沢山, Mizugasawa-yama) is a mountain located in Hiranai, Aomori, Japan at the northern end of the Ōu Mountain Range. It is the tallest mountain on Natsudomari Peninsula at a height of 323.4 meters (1,061 ft).
