= Takahashi Chikuzan =

- Born: June 18, 1910; Nakahiranai, Aomori Prefecture
- Died: February 5, 1998 (aged 87); Hiranai, Aomori Prefecture
- Occupations: Musician, composer

Takahashi Chikuzan (高橋竹山) (born Takahashi Sadazō (高橋 定蔵); 6/18/1910 - 2/5/1998) was a renowned Japanese Tsugaru-jamisen performer and composer.

He was born in Nakahiranai, a village that is now part of the Hiranai township in Aomori Prefecture. He lost his sight at around age two from measles before becoming a live-in apprentice of a Tsugaru-jamisen performer called Toda Jūjirō near his home town. Before World War II he spent many years touring Tohoku and Hokkaido, playing before doorsteps and making money any way he could. After the war he became more widely known, first as an accompanist for the famous Tsugaru folk song singer Narita Unchiku (who named him "Chikuzan"), and subsequently as a solo performer of the Tsugaru-jamisen repertory. His performances, for many years taking place regularly at a small venue called Shibuya Jean-Jean in Shibuya Ward of Tokyo, often featured long solo improvisations, which he entitled "Iwaki" after the tallest mountain in Tsugaru.

His most famous disciple, a woman who has assumed the name Takahashi Chikuzan II, continues to perform versions of Takahashi Chikuzan's repertory. Takahashi Chikuzan made a huge number of recordings, some of which are still in print today.

== See also ==
- The Life of Chikuzan - a film based on his life
