= Eboshi-yama =

Eboshi-yama (Japanese 烏帽子山, "Eboshi mountain", where Eboshi is a Japanese hat) is the name of several mountains in Japan:

- Eboshi-yama (Rubetsu, Hokkaidō)
- Eboshi-yama (Nanae, Hokkaidō), 703m
- Eboshi-yama (Ichinoseki, Iwate), 1109m
- Eboshi-yama (Shiwa, Iwate), 719m
- Eboshi-yama (Yuzawa, Akita), 954m
- Eboshi-yama (Kosaka, Akita), 400m
- Eboshi-yama (Yamagata/Fukushima), 1879m
- Eboshi-yama (Nan’yō/Kaminoyama, Yamagata), 627m
- Eboshi-yama (Iide/Yonezawa, Yamagata), 1197m
- Eboshi-yama (Aizu-Wakamatsu, Fukushima), 580m
- Eboshi-yama (Kaneyama, Fukushima), 714m
- Eboshi-yama (Sanjō/Uonuma, Niigata), 1350m
- Eboshi-yama (Itoigawa, Niigata), 360m
- Eboshi-yama (Aga/Shibata, Niigata), 1573m
- Eboshi-yama (Kurobe, Toyama), 1274m
- Eboshi-yama (Asahi, Toyama), 483m
- Eboshi-yama (Ishikawa), 1136m
- Eboshi-yama (Yamanashi), 1161m
- Eboshi-yama (Nagano), 2123m
- Eboshi-yama (Gifu), 1242m
- Eboshi-yama (Matsuzaki, Shizuoka), 162m
- Eboshi-yama (Fujieda, Shizuoka), 100m
- Eboshi-yama (Kyōto/Hyōgo), 513m
- Eboshi-yama (Wakayama), 909m
- Eboshi-yama (Masuda, Shimane), 338m
- Eboshi-yama (Unnan, Shimane), 625m
- Eboshi-yama (Shimane/Hiroshima), 1225m
- Eboshi-yama (Hiroshima), 529m
- Eboshi-yama (Tokushima), 1670m
- Eboshi-yama (Kagawa), 263m
- Eboshi-yama (Kōchi), 359m
- Eboshi-yama (Ōita), 573m
- Eboshi-yama (Kagoshima), 371m

== See also ==
- Eboshi-dake
