= Shōroku Shintō Yamatoyama =

Religious group in Hiranai, Aomori Prefecture, Japan

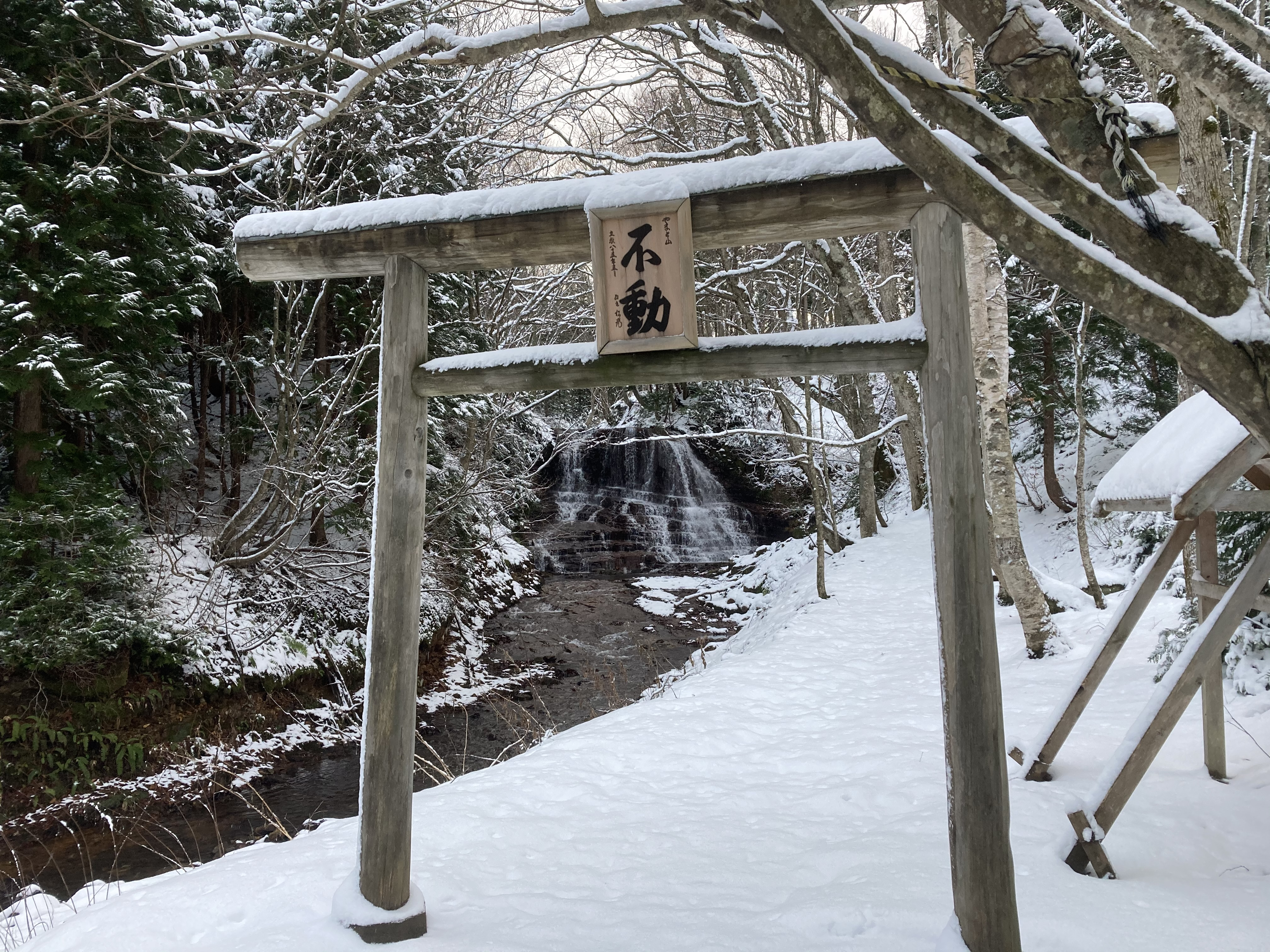
- A torii at Fudo Falls, a holy spot for Shōroku Shintō Yamatoyama

Total population
- 60,000

Founder
- Tazawa Seishirō

Regions with significant populations
- Japan
- Hiranai: 300

Languages
- Japanese

Website
- http://www.yamatoyama.jp/

Shōroku Shintō Yamatoyama (松緑神道大和山) is a Shintō-derived religious movement headquartered in the town of Hiranai in Aomori Prefecture, Japan.

== History ==
Shōroku Shintō Yamatoyama originates from Tazawa Seishirō's dedication of a shrine in 1919 to a Yama-no-Kami after he witnessed extraordinary astronomical phenomena and heard divine voices; however, he officially began the organization in January 1930. It established its headquarters at an isolated tract of land in the mountains of Hiranai in 1969. By 1999 the sect had garnered over 60,000 adherents, primarily from Hokkaido and the Tōhoku region.

A private school run by the movement gained national attention for its use of the deprecated Imperial Rescript on Education in its curriculum. A part of the group's headquarters burned down on 21 March 2021.

== Theology ==
Shōroku Shintō Yamatoyama is a Shintō-derived religious movement that has been strongly influenced by Oomoto and eschatological thoughts potentially inspired from Augustinianism. In 1920, the religion's founder had also spent three days at Oomoto's headquarters in Ayabe.

== Charity operations ==
The charity arm of Shōroku Shintō Yamatoyama works attentively through the organization, the Japanese Committee of the World Conference on Religion and Peace (WCRP/Japan).

- With the help of the Nippon Foundation and WCRP/Japan, it funded the establishment of a leprosy treatment facility in Uiwang, Gyeonggi Province, South Korea on 24 September 1976.
- Tazawa Yasusaburo, the first leader of Shōroku Shintō Yamatoyama and the son of Tazawa Seishirō, initially suggested the mainstay Donate a Meal Campaign that is run by the WCRP/Japan.
