= Yogoshiyama Forest Park =

Forest park in Aomori Prefecture, Japan

- 夜越山森林公園
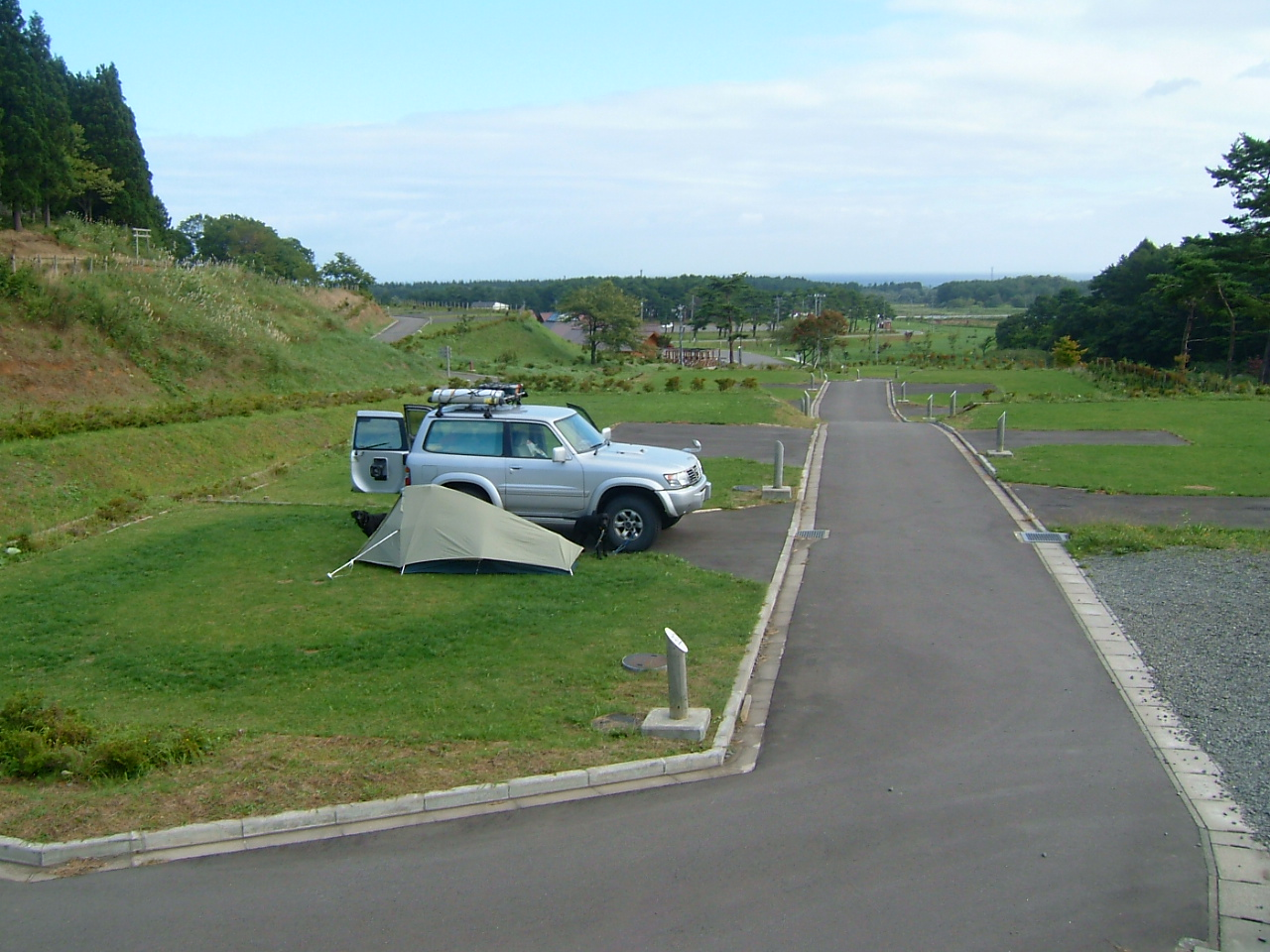
- Interactive map of Yogoshiyama Forest Park
- Nearest city: Hiranai, Aomori
- Coordinates: 40°55′22″N 140°59′14″E
- Public transit: Kominato Station

Yogoshiyama Forest Park (Japanese: 夜越山森林公園(よごしやましんりんこうえん), Hepburn: Yogoshiyama Shinrin Kōen) is a forest park maintained by the municipal government of Hiranai located in Aomori Prefecture, Japan. Since 2015, Clean System Hiranai Co., Ltd. has been responsible for administrative duties within the park as appointed by the town government.

== History ==
On 20 May 1963, Emperor Shōwa was invited to the park to attend the 14th Annual Tree Planting Event and National Greening Convention. The rows of cherry blossom trees in the park were planted in order to commemorate the tree-planting by the emperor and empress. Additionally, a stone monument was erected in honor of "His Majesty the Emperor's Tree-Planting Ceremony".

From 2012 until 2015, the park served as a venue for the Aomori Rock Festival. The event included performances by hip-hop artists, Japanese idol groups, and professional wrestlers.

The park was set to be one of the many sources of the Paralympic flame that would have been collected from around Aomori Prefecture at the Sannai-Maruyama Site in Aomori from where the collected flame would have been sent to the New National Stadium in Tokyo as part of the planned 2020 Summer Paralympics torch relay.

The Scallop Festival, sponsored by the Hiranai Fisherman's Cooperative Association and the town, is held in the park each September.

== Attractions ==
=== Cactus and Orchid Gardens ===
The gardens are contained in 3 vinyl greenhouses built on a site of about 990 square meters (10,700 ft^{2}). About 3,000 varieties of cacti and 400 varieties of orchids are cultivated in the gardens, with around 200 potted tropical orchids. Every year in February the Orchid Festival is held, and the Spring Cactus Festival occurs during Golden Week.

=== Ski area ===
The mountain slope reaches an altitude of 180 meters (590 ft) and has a total of 4 skiing courses: a beginner course, an intermediate course, a cross-country skiing course, and a giant slalom skiing course. There is also a children's course used for sledding next to the ski lift. During the summer, the slope is used as a super slider and a roller skiing area.

=== Automobile camping grounds ===
The campgrounds cover approximately 3,400 square meters (37,000 ft^{2}) with 80 individual sites of 100 square meters (1,100 ft^{2}). The campgrounds do not require reservations, but are only open from 1 May until 31 October each year. After 31 October, visitors may call ahead to secure a campsite before snow begins to fall.

=== Yogoshiyama Onsen ===
The official name of the onsen is "Hiranai Lively Health Buildings at Yogoshiyama Onsen". The 2 "Health Buildings" of the onsen are equipped with a large public bath, a children's pool, a conference room, and a training room. There are no accommodations available on-site.

=== Access ===
36-1 Horikae, Hamago, Hiranai, Higashitsugaru, Aomori, Japan

Accessible by taxi or Shimokita Kōtsū bus from Kominato Station.
