= Kominato Station =

Railway station in Hiranai, Aomori Prefecture, Japan

Kominato Station 小湊駅
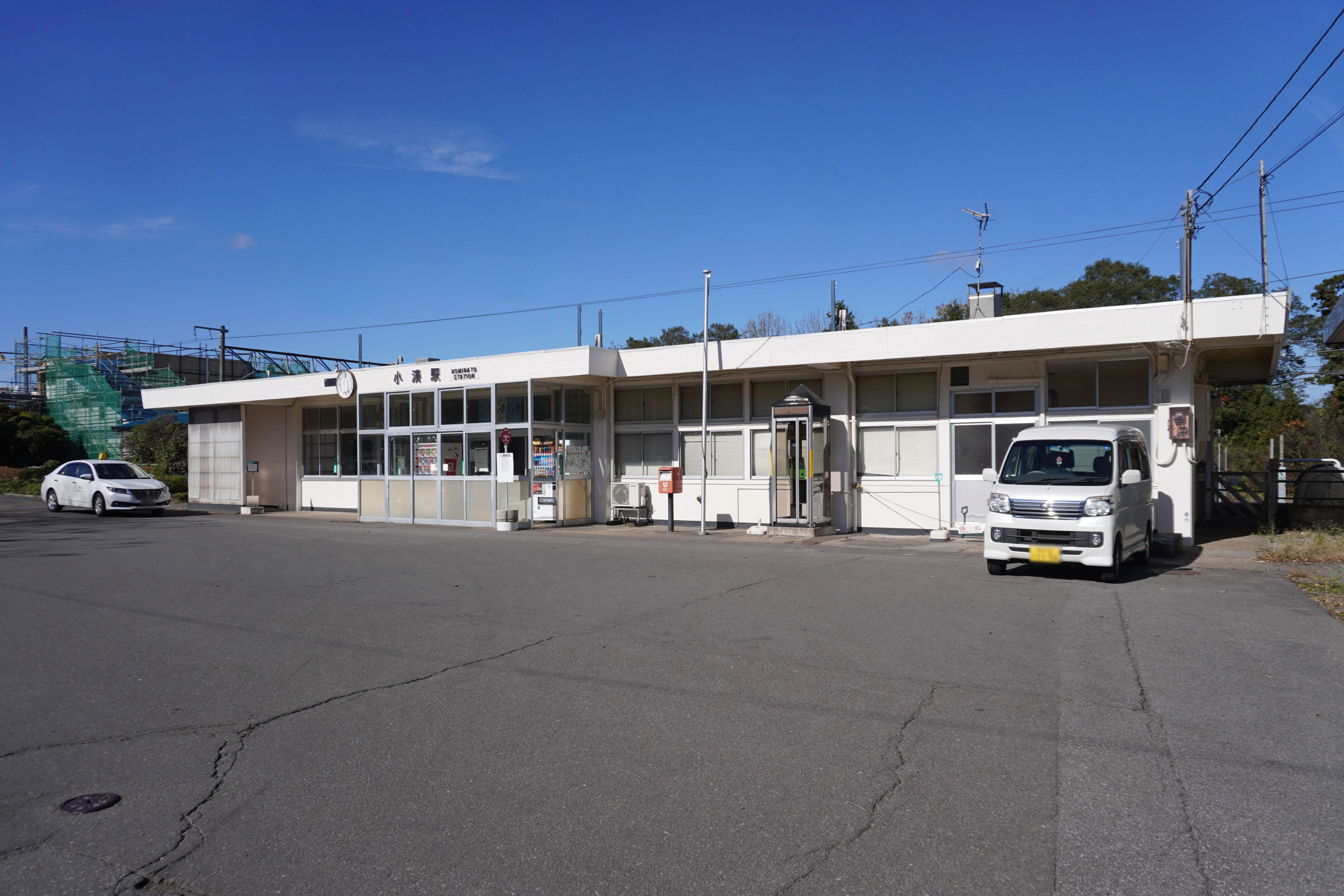
- Kominato Station in October 2023

General information
- Location: 12-1 Shitada, Kominato, Hiranai, Higashitsugaru District, Aomori Prefecture 039-3321; Japan
- Coordinates: 40°55′47″N 140°57′18″E
- System: Regional rail station
- Operator: Aoimori Railway
- Line: ■ Aoimori Railway Line
- Distance: 94.5 km from Metoki; 27.4 km from Aomori
- Platforms: 1 island + 1 side platform
- Tracks: 3
- Connections: Shimokita Kōtsu Bus

Construction
- Parking: Free parking nearby
- Cycle facilities: Bicycle racks

Other information
- Status: Staffed (Midori no Madoguchi) from 6:30 am to 2:00 pm on Mondays, Wednesdays, and Fridays
- Website: Official website

History
- Opened: 1 September 1891
- Rebuilt: 1 September 1986

Passengers
- 844 daily boardings (2018)

Services
Preceding station	Aoimori Railway	Following station
Shimizugawa towards Metoki	Aoimori Railway Line	Nishi-Hiranai towards Aomori
Location
- Location within Aomori Prefecture Location within Japan

Kominato Station (小湊駅, Kominato-eki) is a railway station of the Aoimori Railway Line located in the central district of the town of Hiranai in Aomori Prefecture, Japan. The station has been in operation since 1891, with a new station building – consisting of a side and island platform connected to the station building by a footbridge – was completed in 1986. Since 2010, the station has been operated by the Aoimori Railway Company, a third sector, regional rail operator. It is the busiest railway station in Hiranai.

Passenger trains serve the station 17 hours a day; the departure time between trains is roughly 30 minutes during the morning peak with reduced frequency at other times. The station also serves as a bus station for Shimokita Kōtsu, with local bus routes connecting the station and central Hiranai to communities throughout the town.

== Location ==
Kominato Station is located at the northern terminus of Aomori Prefecture Route 215, a 779-meter-long (2,556 ft) road that provides access to the station from Japan National Route 4 in central Hiranai. The station is situated at the northern edge of the urban core of Hiranai and is in close proximity to the town hall, the library, Kominato Elementary and Middle Schools, several historic landmarks, and the local history museum of Hiranai; all of which lie just south to the station.

At the time of the station's inception, it was located one hundred meters away from the hall of Nakahiranai; however, as of 2021 the site is occupied by the local history museum. To the north of the station is a snow barrier forest that protects the railway from heavy snowfall. Kominato Station is served by the Aoimori Railway Line, and is 27.4 kilometers from the northern terminus of the line, Aomori Station, and 94.5 kilometers from the southern terminus of the line at Metoki Station. It is 711.8 kilometers from Tokyo along the original Tōhoku Main Line. The stations adjacent to Kominato Station along the Aoimori Railway Line are Shimizugawa Station and Nishi-Hiranai Station.

== Station layout ==
Kominato Station has an island platform and a side platform serving three tracks. The island platform is connected to the station building and side platform by a footbridge. Only tracks 1 and 3 are used by trains moving through the station, the rails for track 2 are used only as a siding, giving the station an effective structure of two opposed side platforms. The station building is attended from 6:30 am to 2:00 pm on Mondays, Wednesdays and Fridays, and has a Midori no Madoguchi staffed ticket office. Tickets can be purchased at an automatic dispenser while passenger trains are running. The area outside of the station entrance features public bicycle racks and a parking lot.

=== Platforms ===
1	■ Aoimori Railway Line	for Asamushi-Onsen and Aomori
2	■ Aoimori Railway Line	(siding)
3	■ Aoimori Railway Line	for Hachinohe

=== Public art ===
A major component of the station's architecture is the elevated footbridge linking the island platform to the station building. The raised structure contains the station's sole piece of public art; a series of paintings depicting scenes from around Hiranai showcasing the town's landscapes, flora, fauna, and industry created by the art club of the Hiranai branch of Aomori-Higashi High School in 2001. By 2012, the installation had begun to deteriorate, so students from the same school spent two months cleaning the art installation and the station building before repairing and repainting the scenes between October 2012 and December 2012. Until 2024 while station staff are present, official stamps for Kominato Station and the other train stations of Hiranai could be obtained at Kominato Station. These stamps were relocated after cuts were made to the time Kominato Station is staffed. These stamps can be found at nearby stations with Kominato Station's stamp now being located at Noheji Station.

== History ==
Construction of the Ueno–Aomori line of the Nippon Railway and Kominato Station began in the former village of Nakahiranai in 1890. Supplies were unloaded at a nearby port, Asadokoro, and transported to the build site that was centered on Kominato Station. The station was opened to traffic on 1 September 1891. The Nippon Railway originally intended for Kominato Station to be the northern terminus of the rail line, but Aomori Station was eventually selected. During the winter following the station's opening, snow would blow in from the open fields adjacent to the station and the tracks would frequently be blocked by snow. In an attempt to mitigate the snow blockages, trees were planted adjacent to the station in May 1892 to create a barrier between the fields and the railway. It became a station on the Tōhoku Main Line of the Japanese Government Railways (JGR), the pre-war predecessor to the Japan National Railways (JNR), after the nationalization of the Nippon Railway on 1 November 1906.

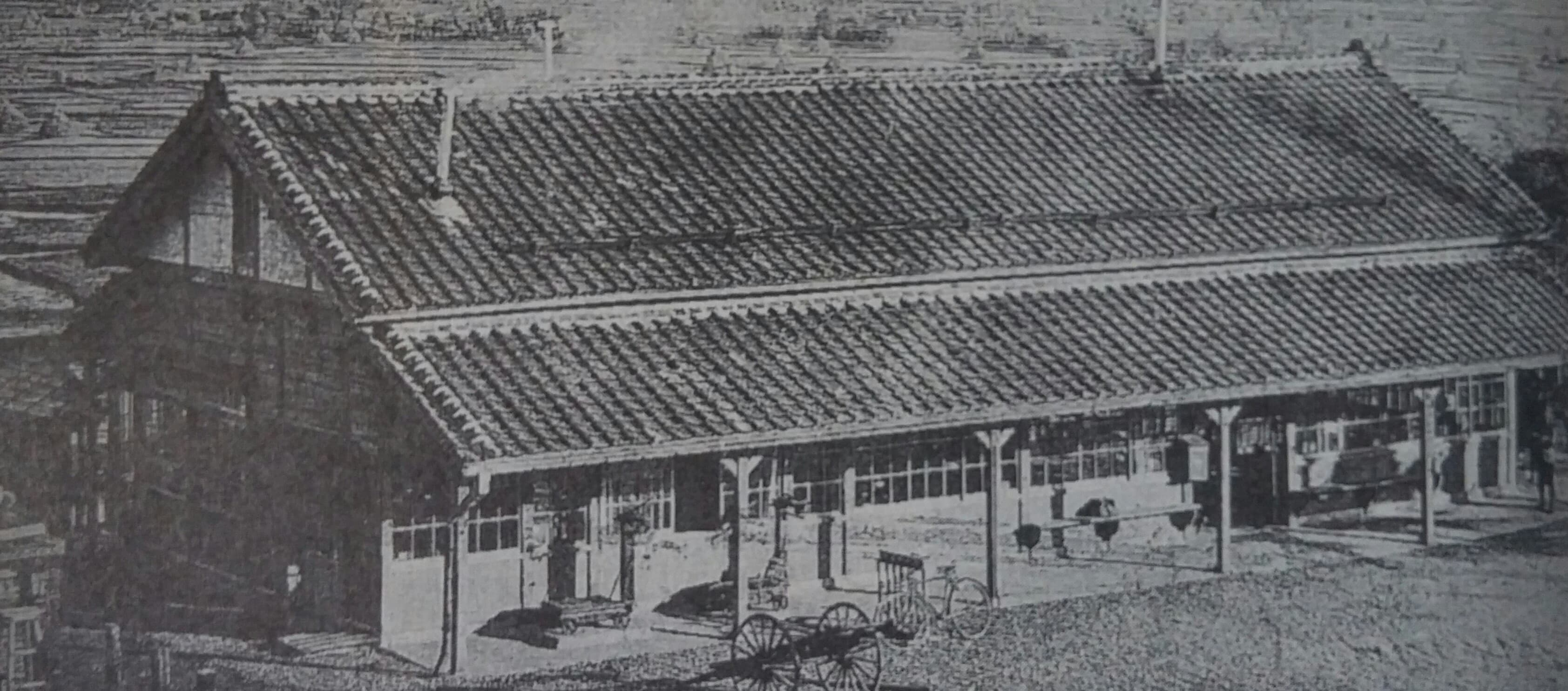
Kominato Station in 1947

The station escaped destruction during World War II and was developed during the war as a backup terminal station to prepare for the eventuality of Aomori Station being destroyed. Aomori Station was destroyed during the strategic bombing of Aomori on 28 July 1945, and Kominato Station picked up the destroyed station's role as the terminal station of the Tōhoku Main Line until the reconstruction of the former was completed on 15 July 1949. In 1961, the reconstruction of Kominato Station began, with the aim of replacing the World War II-era building. As an early phase of the project, the elevated footbridge at the station was installed on 29 June 1961. Regularly scheduled freight services were discontinued in February 1962 and the reconstruction of the station building was completed the same year.

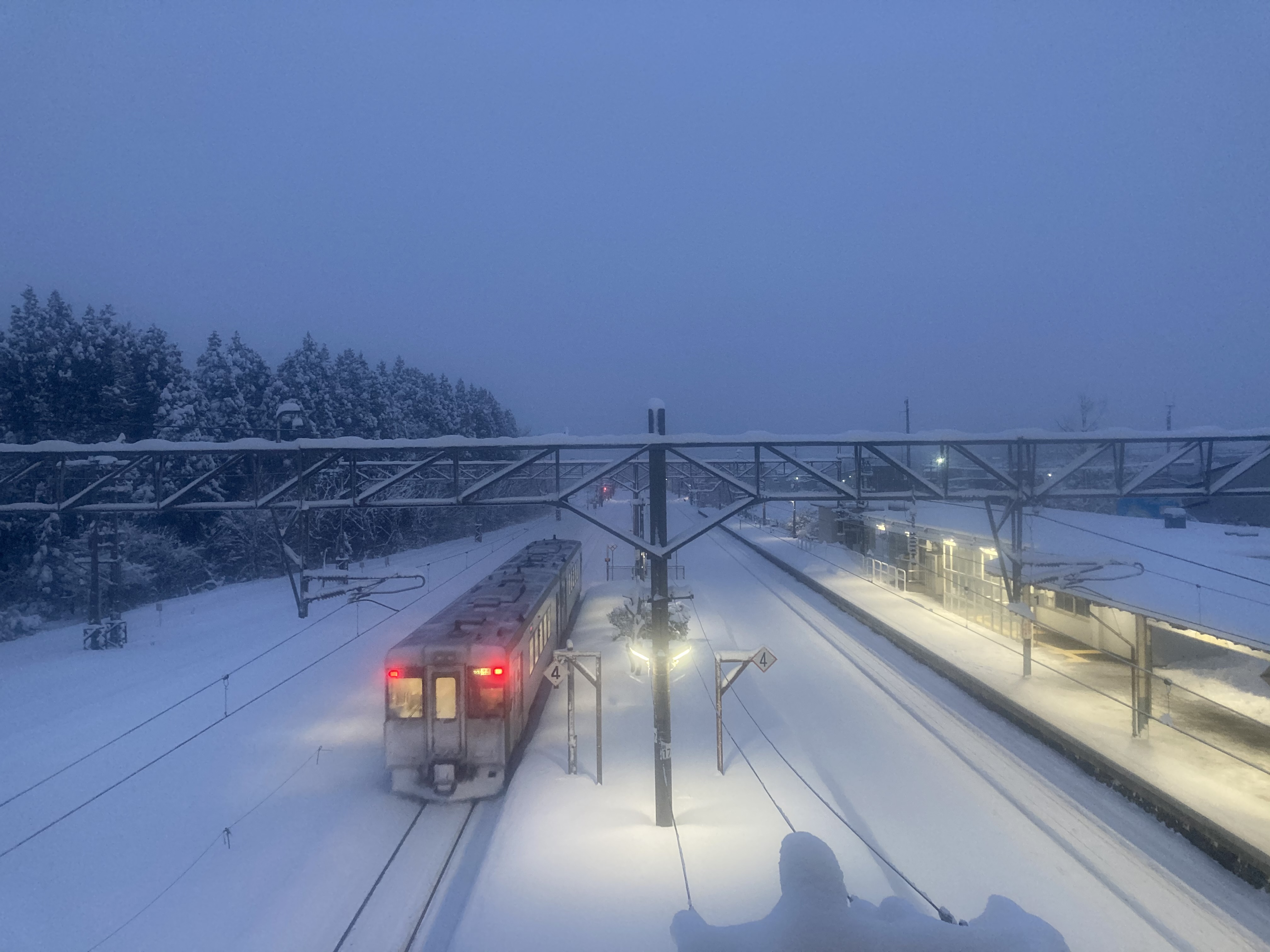
An Ōminato-bound KiHa 100 series set on a Shimokita service departing from Kominato Station in December 2020.

It was being considered for closure in March 1972 due to financial difficulties for the JNR, but the people of Hiranai successfully protested the motion to close the station. The current station building was opened on 1 September 1986—the station's 95th anniversary—replacing the one built in 1962. With the privatization of the JNR on 1 April 1987, the station came under the operational control of East Japan Railway Company (JR East). Beginning on 1 April 2004, the station building was operated by Jaster Co., Ltd., a subsidiary of JR East, with a ticketing window for ordinary tickets, express tickets, and reserved-seat tickets for all JR lines.

On 4 December 2010, the Tōhoku Shinkansen was successfully extended north to Shin-Aomori Station from Hachinohe. As a result of the opening of the bullet train between the two stations, that section of the Tōhoku Main Line including this station was transferred to the Aoimori Railway Company from JR East on the same day. The exchange of management was celebrated by the government of Hiranai by the town hall offering free scallop and fish ball soup—a specialty of the town—to every person who visited Kominato Station on the day of the change. Under the management of the regional railway, the station is run as a part of a public–private partnership between the government of Aomori Prefecture and the Aoimori Railway Company. The station was renovated most recently in the summer of 2018. On 13 March 2021, the Shimokita service operated jointly by JR East and the Aoimori Railway between Aomori and Ōminato that stopped at Kominato Station was abolished. In March 2023 the operating hours for the station's ticket office were reduced, initially as a temporary measure, by closing the station at 2:00 pm rather than 3:10 pm and the end of all operations on Tuesdays, Thursdays, Saturdays, and Sundays. Two years later, the temporary change was made permanent.

== Services ==
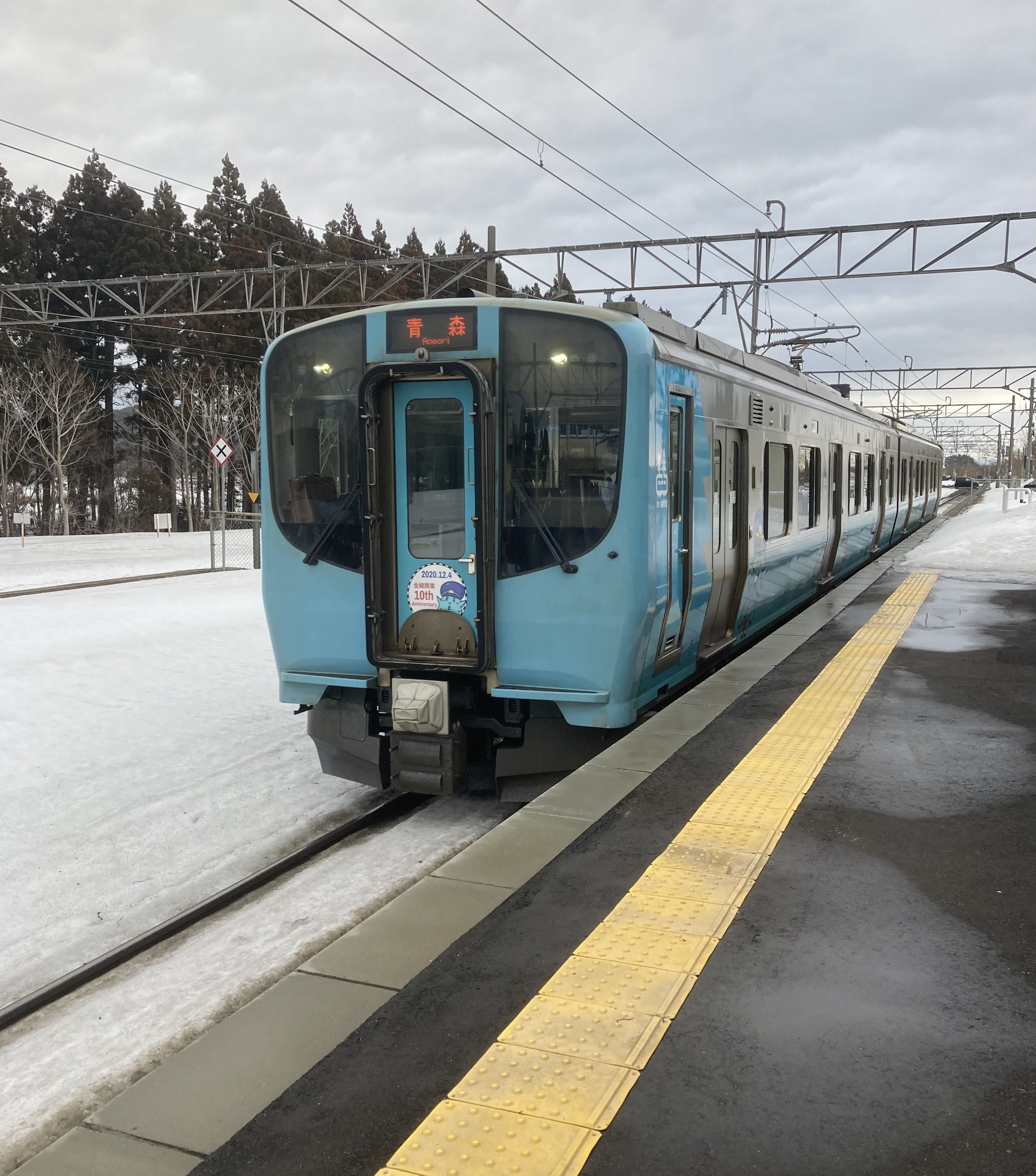
An Aomori-bound Aoimori 703 series set arriving at Kominato Station. The snow barrier forest can be seen to the left of the train.

The station is primarily served by trains operating on a local service on the Aoimori Railway Line between Aomori and Hachinohe. It is served by one rapid express train, the 560M train operated jointly by the Aoimori Railway and the Iwate Galaxy Railway between Aomori and Morioka. Passenger trains serve Kominato Station just over 17 hours a day from 6:10 am to 11:21 pm. At peak hours between the first train and 9:06 am, trains depart from the station roughly every 30 minutes; otherwise trains depart at an approximate hourly basis. In 2018, a daily average of 844 passengers boarded trains at Kominato Station, an increase from the daily average of 410 passengers the station served in 2010, the final year of its ownership by JR East. In 2018, the station was the eighth busiest on the Aoimori Railway Line, excluding Aomori and Hachinohe stations. It has been the busiest station along the Aoimori Railway Line in Hiranai throughout the line's existence.

=== Bus services ===
Kominato Station also functions as a bus station, with five municipal bus lines stopping at the station and one seasonal long-distance bus stopping nearby. Shimokita Kōtsu, the operator of Hiranai's municipal bus network, operates the local routes that stop at the station, traveling to points within the town including Higashitaki, Asadokoro, Higashitazawa, Moura, Nakano, Inaoi, Soto-Dōshi, Matsunoki, Shimizugawa, Karibasawa, and Nakano, as well as providing a connection to the Aomori City Bus at Asamushi Onsen. Tickets can be purchased for seasonal Kōnan Bus Company services to Shinjuku at Kominato Station; however, the bus picks passengers up from the Hiranai Community Center within walking distance rather than at Kominato Station.

== See also ==
- List of railway stations in Japan
