= Eboshi-dake (Aomori) =

Mountain in Aomori prefecture, Japan

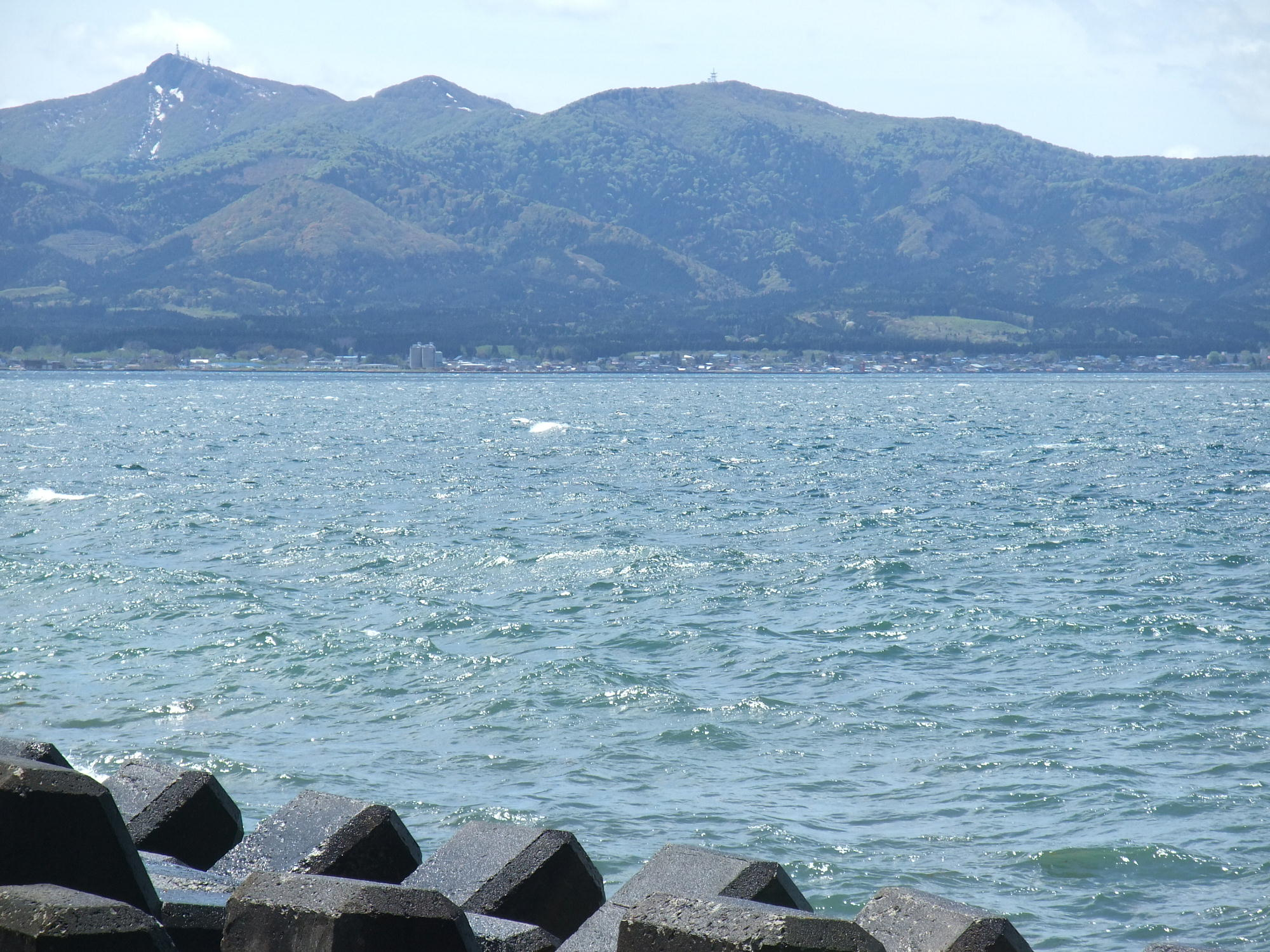

Highest point
- Elevation: 719.6 m (2,361 ft)
- Coordinates: 40°50′26″N 141°2′22″E

Naming
- Native name: 烏帽子岳 (Eboshi-dake)

Geography
- Location: The border of Hiranai, Aomori, Noheji, Aomori, Tōhoku, Aomori, Japan
- Parent range: Ōu Mountains

Climbing
- Easiest route: Road, footpath

Eboshi-dake (烏帽子岳, Eboshi-dake) "Eboshi peak", with Eboshi being a Japanese hat, is a 719.6 metres (2,361 ft) high mountain in the extreme north of the Japanese main island, Honshu, at the northern end of the Ōu Mountain Range.

Its peak forms the boundary between the communities of Hiranai in the northwest, Noheji in the northeast, and Tōhoku in the south, all located in Aomori Prefecture.

A radio repeater was built on the mountain in 2007 for the three municipalities listed above to broadcast the following digital television stations: NHK, NHK Kyōiku, RAB Aomori, ATV Aomori Television, and ABA Aomori.

The mountain is a popular destination among casual hikers due to its gentle slope and its plant diversity a popular destination. Its north side is also accessible by a road.
