= Kominato, Aomori =

Kominato 小湊町
- Former municipality
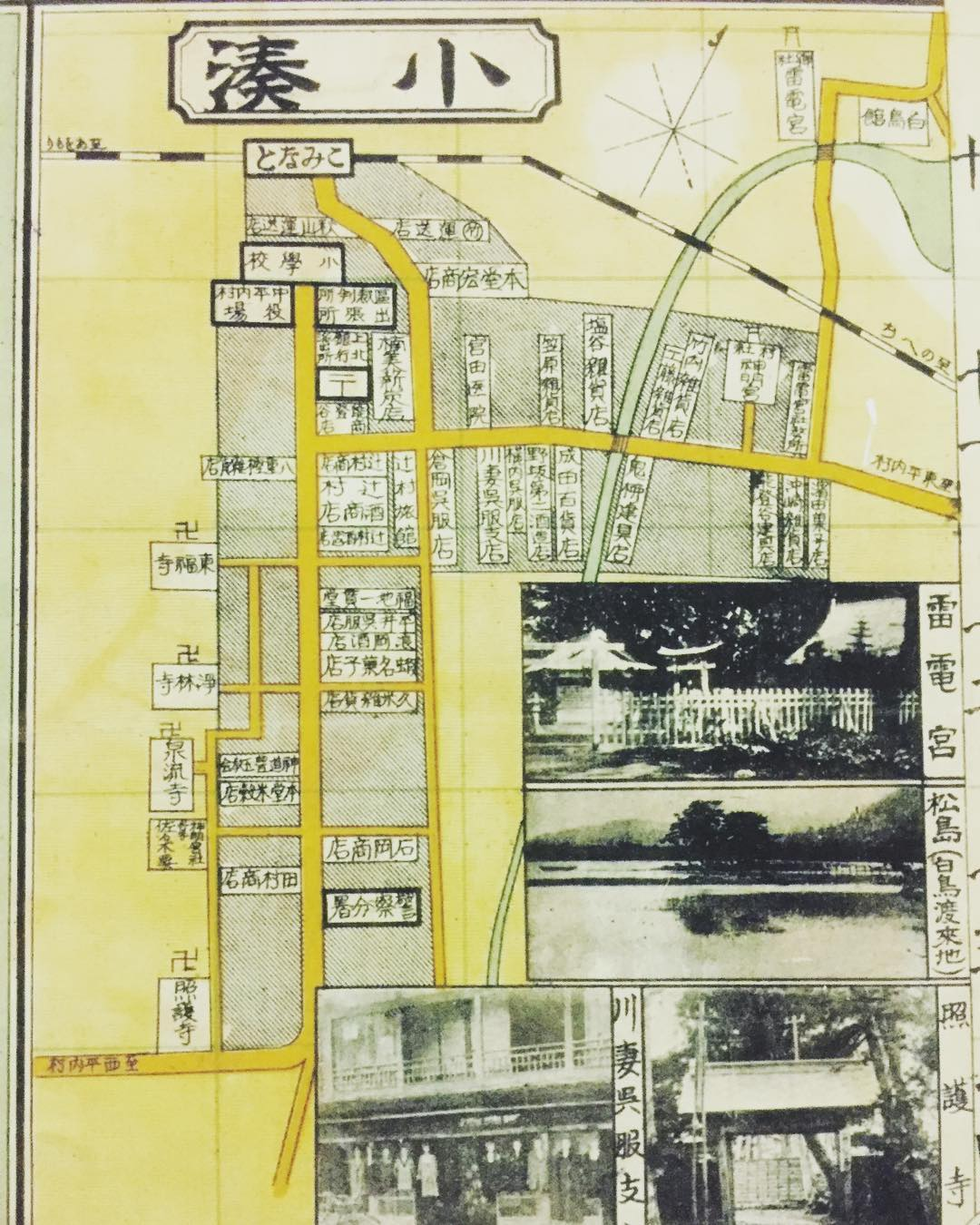
- A map of Kominato as it was in 1926. The Ōshū Kaidō followed the thick yellow line from the center-right edge of the map, turned south through the center of the town, then west, leaving the map in the bottom-left edge of the map.

- Location in Japan
- Coordinates: 40°55′33.4″N 140°57′21.1″E
- Country: Japan
- Region: Tōhoku
- Prefecture: Aomori Prefecture
- District: Higashitsugaru
- Merged: 31 March 1955 (now part of Hiranai)

Population (1950)
  - Total: 9,790
- Time zone: UTC+09:00 (JST)

Kominato (小湊町, Kominato-machi) was a town located in Higashitsugaru District in central Aomori Prefecture, Japan. It is now the central district of the town, Hiranai.

== History ==
During Edo period when the area was controlled by the Tsugaru clan of Kuroishi Domain, what would become Kominato was the center of power for the eastern part of the Kuroishi Domain. Kominato was founded on 1 April 1889, as the village of Nakahiranai. It was elevated to a town on 1 October 1928, and the town's name was officially changed to Kominato as part of the celebration of the enthronement of Emperor Hirohito.

After the conclusion of the Pacific War, the point where the Morita River meets Mutsu Bay on the coast of Kominato was chosen by the Ministry of Transport as the site of a shipping port to Hakodate, Hokkaido to replace the port destroyed in Aomori by air raids. Construction on a temporary port was completed on 1 July 1946, with services continuing until 15 July 1949. The services were cancelled because Japan National Railways assumed control of the port from the Ministry of Transport and then decided that the rebuilt port in Aomori would be more profitable than building a permanent port in Kominato. Despite losing the port's failure in turning Kominato into a transport hub, the town continued to make use of the port in its scallop industry.

On 31 March 1955, the town was merged with the neighboring Higashi-Hiranai and Nishi-Hiranai villages to make the currently extant town, Hiranai, with its government centered in Kominato.

At the time of its merger, Kominato had a population of 9,790.

== Neighboring municipalities ==
These were the neighboring municipalities of Kominato just before its incorporation into Hiranai.

- Aomori – this part of Aomori was the village, Azumadake until 1 January 1955.
- Nonai – now part of Aomori
- Nishi-Hiranai – now part of Hiranai
- Higashi-Hiranai – now part of Hiranai

== Economy ==
The town once had a busy port, connecting the Japanese islands Honshu and Hokkaido to the north by ferry; however, the ferry services were moved to Aomori by the beginning of the 20th century. They returned to Kominato after 90 percent of Aomori was destroyed by American B-29 bombers during World War II; however, the services moved once again when Aomori recovered from the air raids. Otherwise, the town had a sizable paddy field system and was known for its scallops.

== Transportation ==
- Matsumaedō – a sub-route of the Ōshū Kaidō; today it exists roughly along National Route 4. Kominato-juku (小湊宿) was the 36th of 44 shukuba along the Matsumaedō connecting Aoba Castle in Sendai Domain (now Miyagi Prefecture) to Cape Tappi in Hirosaki Domain (now part of Aomori Prefecture). After its creation in 1952, National Route 4 bypassed central Kominato, while the old Edo-era national road went through the center of the town. Parts of that route are currently designated as Aomori Prefecture Routes 9 and 215.
- Japan National Railways
  - Tōhoku Main Line – currently Aoimori Railway Line
    - Kominato Station
  - Seikan ferry – for a short period of time before the port near Aomori Station was completed, the ferry traveled from Kominato Port to Hakodate, Hokkaido with access to the Tōhoku Main Line via Kominato Station.

== Notable people from Kominato ==
- Takahashi Chikuzan - professional Tsugaru-jamisen musician
