= Asadokoro =

Asadokoro 浅所
- Neighborhood
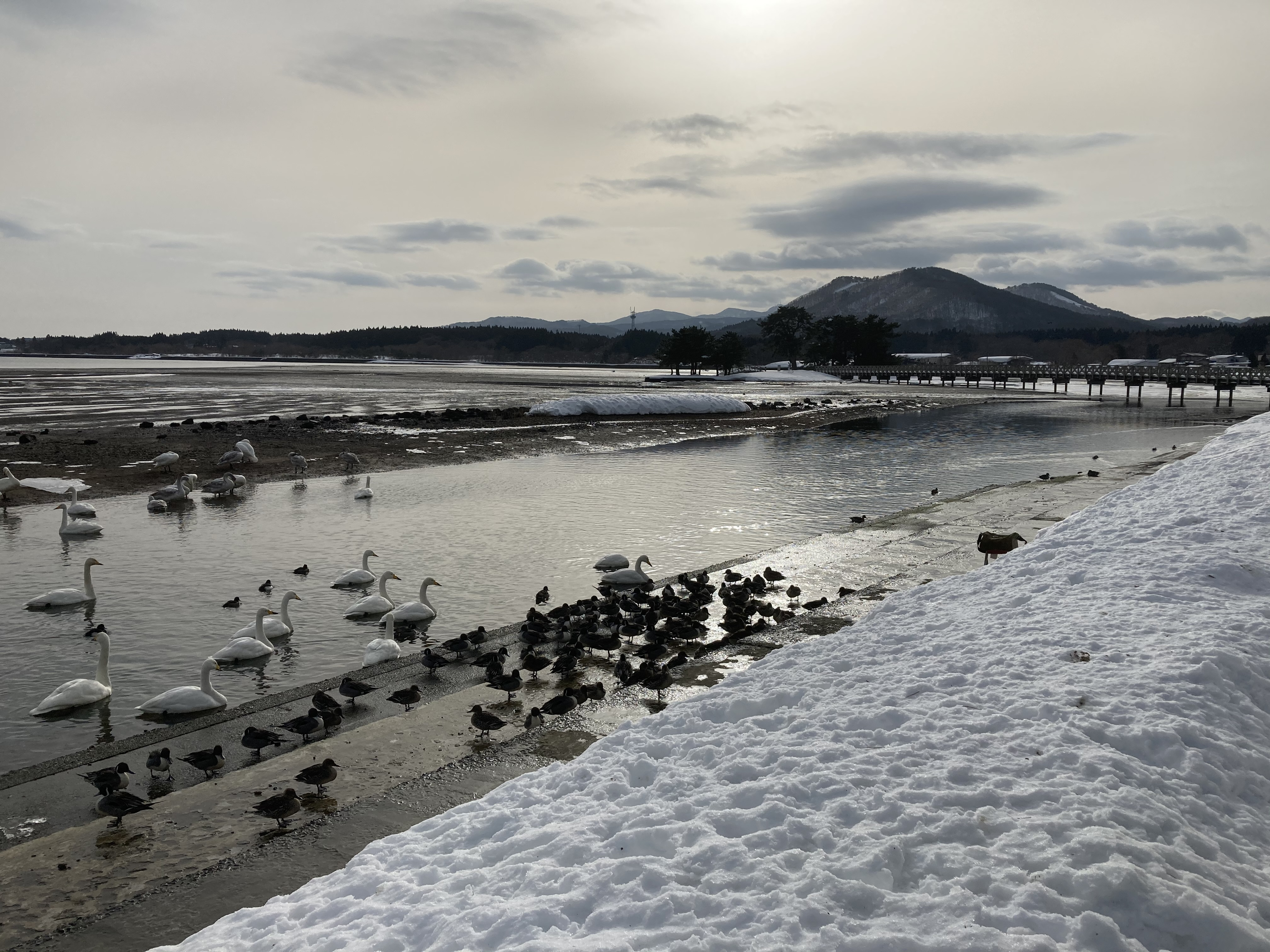
- The tidal flats of Asadokoro
- Interactive map of Asadokoro
- Coordinates: 40°56′35.52″N 140°58′39.36″E
- Country: Japan
- Prefecture: Aomori
- Town: Hiranai
- Postal code: 039-3312

Asadokoro (Japanese: 浅所) is a coastal neighborhood in the town of Hiranai in Aomori Prefecture, Japan. It is known for its tidal flats on the coast of Mutsu Bay that attract groups of migratory birds. The flats are designated as a National Special Natural Monument.
