= Asamushi-Natsudomari Prefectural Natural Park =

Natural park of Aomori prefecture, Japan

Coordinates: 41°1′22″N 140°52′15″E

- 浅虫夏泊県立自然公園
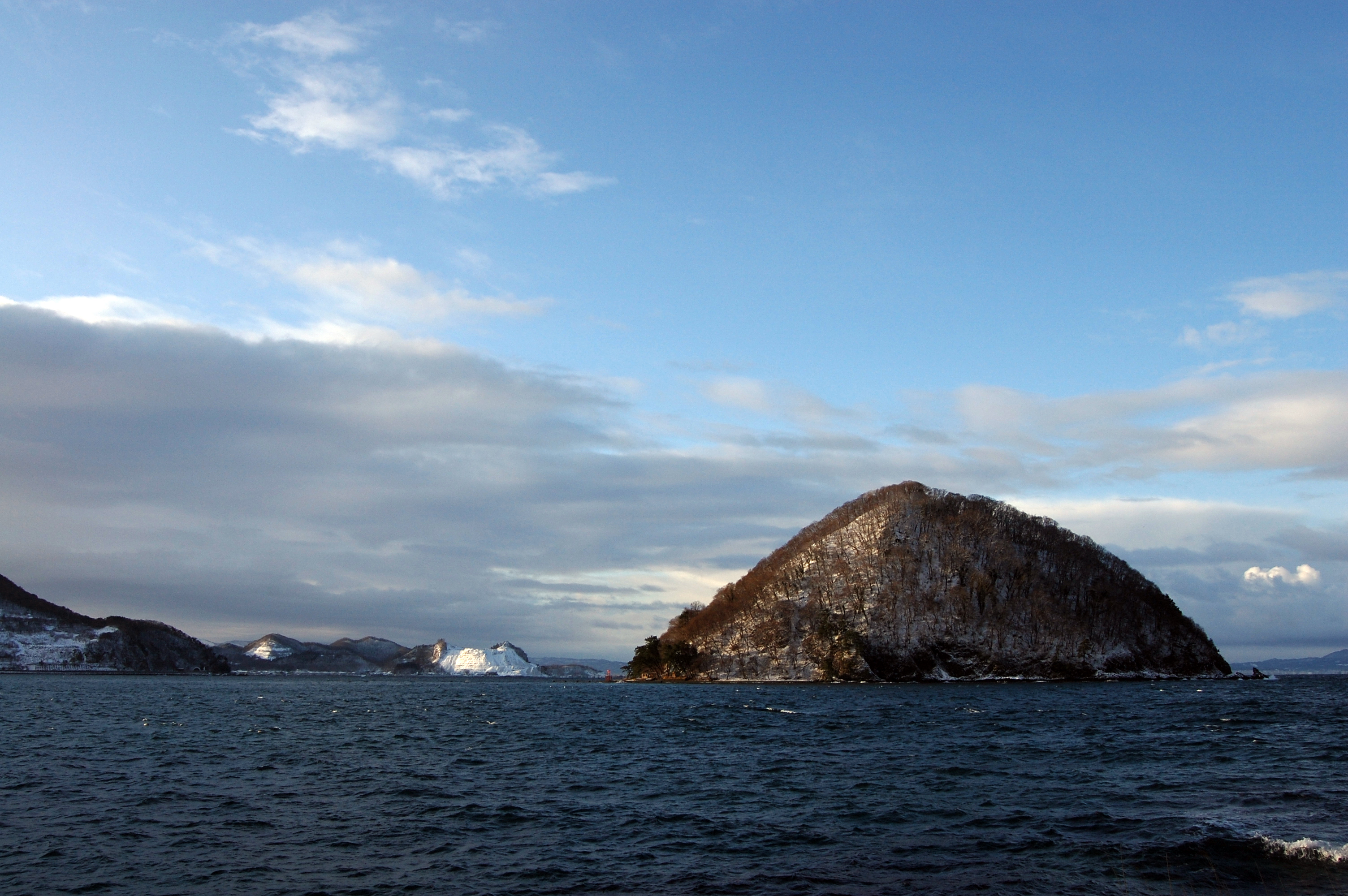
- Yunoshima in Mutsu Bay
- Interactive map of Asamushi-Natsudomari Prefectural Natural Park
- Location: Aomori Prefecture, Japan
- Nearest city: Aomori/Hiranai
- Area: 54.66 km^{2} (21.10 sq mi)
- Established: 10 June 1953

Asamushi-Natsudomari Prefectural Natural Park (浅虫夏泊県立自然公園, Asamushi-Natsudomari kenritsu shizen-kōen) is a Prefectural Natural Park on the north coast of Aomori Prefecture, Japan, overlooking Mutsu Bay. Established in 1953, the park spans the borders of the municipalities of Aomori and Hiranai. It encompasses Asamushi Onsen and the coastline of the Natsudomari Peninsula (夏泊半島).

== See also ==
- National Parks of Japan
