= Shibuya Jean-Jean =

Defunct theatre in Tokyo, Japan

Shibuya Jean-Jean (渋谷ジァン・ジァン, Shibuya jan-jan) was a small theatre in Shibuya in Tokyo which was open from 1969 to 2000. It was the site of regular performances by Takahashi Chikuzan until his death, regular performances by Nobuo Nakamura of The Lesson, and live appearances by Noriko Awaya and Akihiro Miwa.
