= Hiranai =

Town in Aomori Prefecture, Japan

Hiranai 平内町
- Town
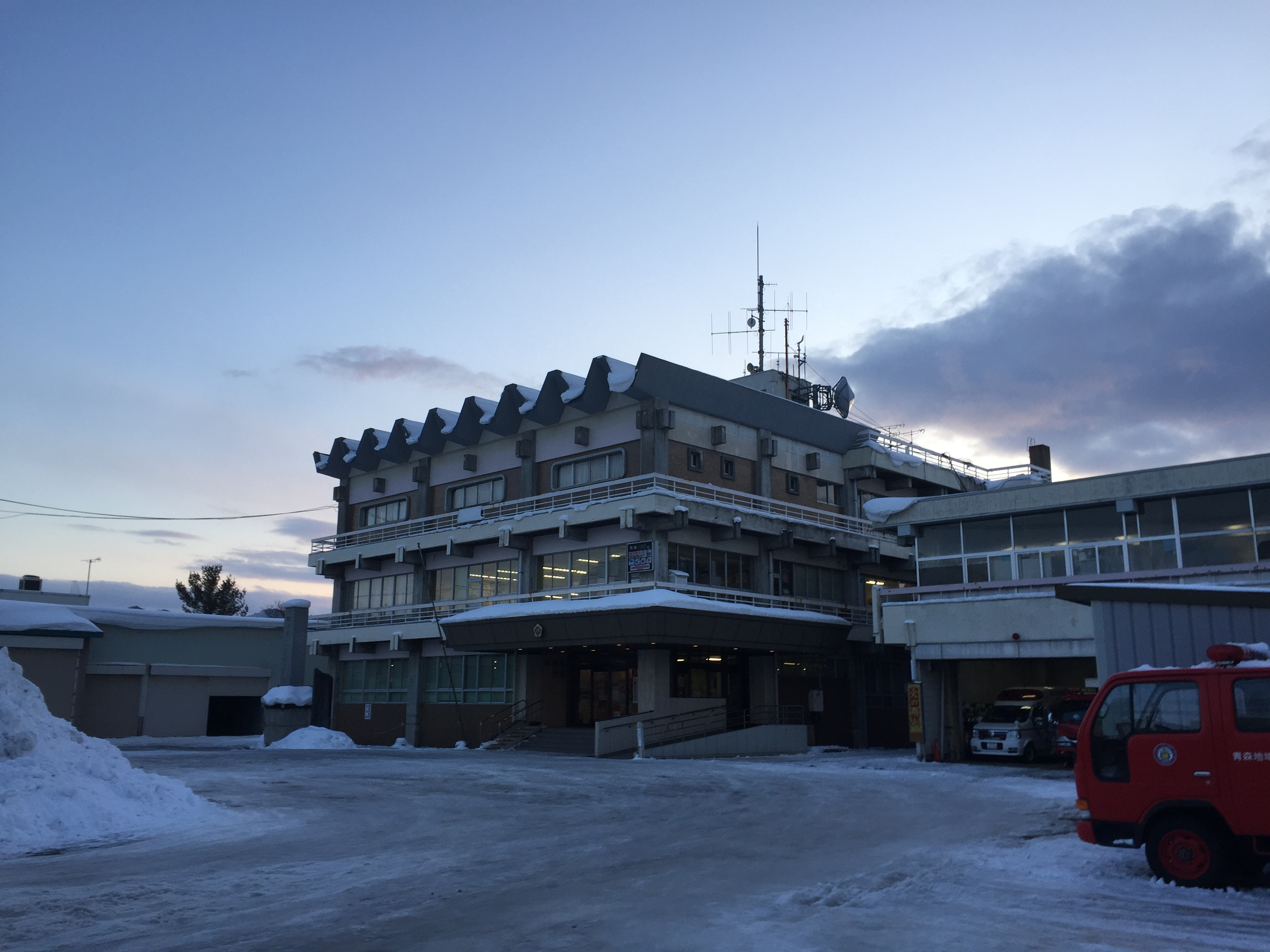
- Hiranai Town Hall

- Flag Emblem
- Nickname: Scallop Kingdom (ホタテ王国, Hotate Ōkoku)
- Location of Hiranai in Aomori Prefecture

- Location within Japan
- Coordinates: 40°55′33.4″N 140°57′21.1″E
- Country: Japan
- Region: Tōhoku
- Prefecture: Aomori
- District: Higashitsugaru

Government
  - Mayor: Shigehisa Funahashi

Area
  - Total: 217.09 km^{2} (83.82 sq mi)
- Elevation: 15 m (49 ft)

Population (September 2025)
  - Total: 9,616
  - Density: 44.29/km^{2} (114.7/sq mi)
- Time zone: UTC+9 (Japan Standard Time)
- Postal code: 039-33xx
- Phone number: 017-755-2111
- Address: 63 Kominato, Hiranai-machi, Higashitsugaru-gun, Aomori-ken 039-3393
- Website: Official website
- Symbols
- Bird: Swan
- Flower: Camellia
- Tree: Japanese red pine

Hiranai (Japanese: 平内町, Hepburn: Hiranai-machi) (Ainu: ピラナィ, romanized: piranay) is a town located in Aomori Prefecture, Japan and a part of the Aomori metropolitan area. As of 1 September 2025, the town had an estimated population of 9,616 in 4,726 households, and a population density of 44 persons per km^{2}. It is the most heavily populated town in Higashitsugaru District. The total area of the town is 217.09 km^{2} (83.82 sq mi).

== Etymology ==
The name Hiranai is thought to have originated from the Ainu who originally inhabited the area. The Ainu words for pira (ピラ, cliff) and nay (ナィ, river) are said to be the original name of the area, due to its geography as a river valley in the interior of the mountainous Natsudomari Peninsula. However, the current Japanese pronunciation and meaning of the town's name, Hiranai (平内; 平 hira "flat", and 内 nai "inside") is descriptive of the valley, but is based on the flat area inside of the mountains or the bay that surrounds it.

== History ==
During the Edo period, Hiranai was a village. On 17 September 1656, the village became part of Kuroishi Domain controlled by the Tsugaru clan. Up to the middle of the Edo period, the isolated areas of Hiranai were some of the last sanctuaries for the Ainu people in Honshu. However, they were assimilated into the rest of the population by pushes made by the ruling Tsugaru clan in 1756 and 1809. In July 1871, with the abolition of the han system, Kuroishi Domain briefly became Kuroishi Prefecture, and was merged into the newly created Aomori Prefecture in September 1871. During the cadastral reform of 1889, Natsudomari Peninsula was divided into the three villages of Naka-Hiranai, Nishi-Hiranai, and Higashi-Hiranai. On 1 October 1928, Naka-Hiranai became a town, renaming itself Kominato.

=== 1939 to present ===
Nishi-Hiranai village's train station, Nishi-Hiranai Station opened in 1939. The station was built to provide access to the Aomori Sanatorium, a facility to treat the soldiers who were injured during the Second Sino-Japanese War and later, the Pacific War. The climate of Natsudomari Peninsula and the proximity to Asamushi Onsen was of benefit to the wounded soldiers. After the end of hostilities, the sanatorium was closed.

On 15 July 1945, four seaplanes of the Imperial Japanese Army's Giretsu Kuteitai docked off the east coast of Natsudomari Peninsula were bombed. Off the northern coast of the peninsula a ship was sunk, killing 3 and leaving 9 injured.

On the 9th and 10 August of the same year Grumman TBF Avengers bombed the entirety of the town and a troop transport ship, the Hanasaki Maru, was sunk. One person was wounded.

On 31 March 1955, Kominato merged with Nishi-Hiranai and Higashi-Hiranai to form the town, Hiranai. On 20 May 1963, Emperor Shōwa and Empress Kōjun visited Hiranai to plant a Japanese red pine in the Yogoshiyama Forest Park for the 14th Annual Tree Planting Event and National Greening Convention.

In 2012, Hiranai won a competition amongst towns and cities in Aomori Prefecture for who could produce the best advertisement film for their town. The film was titled, It's not "The Town that Nobody Knows"! (しらない町じゃないよ！, Shiranai-machi janaiyo!) as a play on the pronunciation of the town's name and that the town isn't well known. The commercial features a child looking for the town, Shiranai, but nobody knows where that is. She then is told that she is probably looking for Hiranai and that it's not a town that nobody knows. This phrase from the film is well known by the town's citizens.

== Demographics ==
Per Japanese census data, the population of Hiranai has decreased by 38% over the past 50 years. The town's population dropped below 10,000 for the first time in a century in November 2023.

Historical population

Year	Pop.	±%
1920	11,054	—
1930	11,971	+8.3%
1940	12,681	+5.9%
1950	19,328	+52.4%
1960	18,836	−2.5%
1970	17,551	−6.8%

Year	Pop.	±%
1980	17,501	−0.3%
1990	16,103	−8.0%
2000	14,528	−9.8%
2010	12,361	−14.9%
2020	10,874	−12.0%

== Geography ==
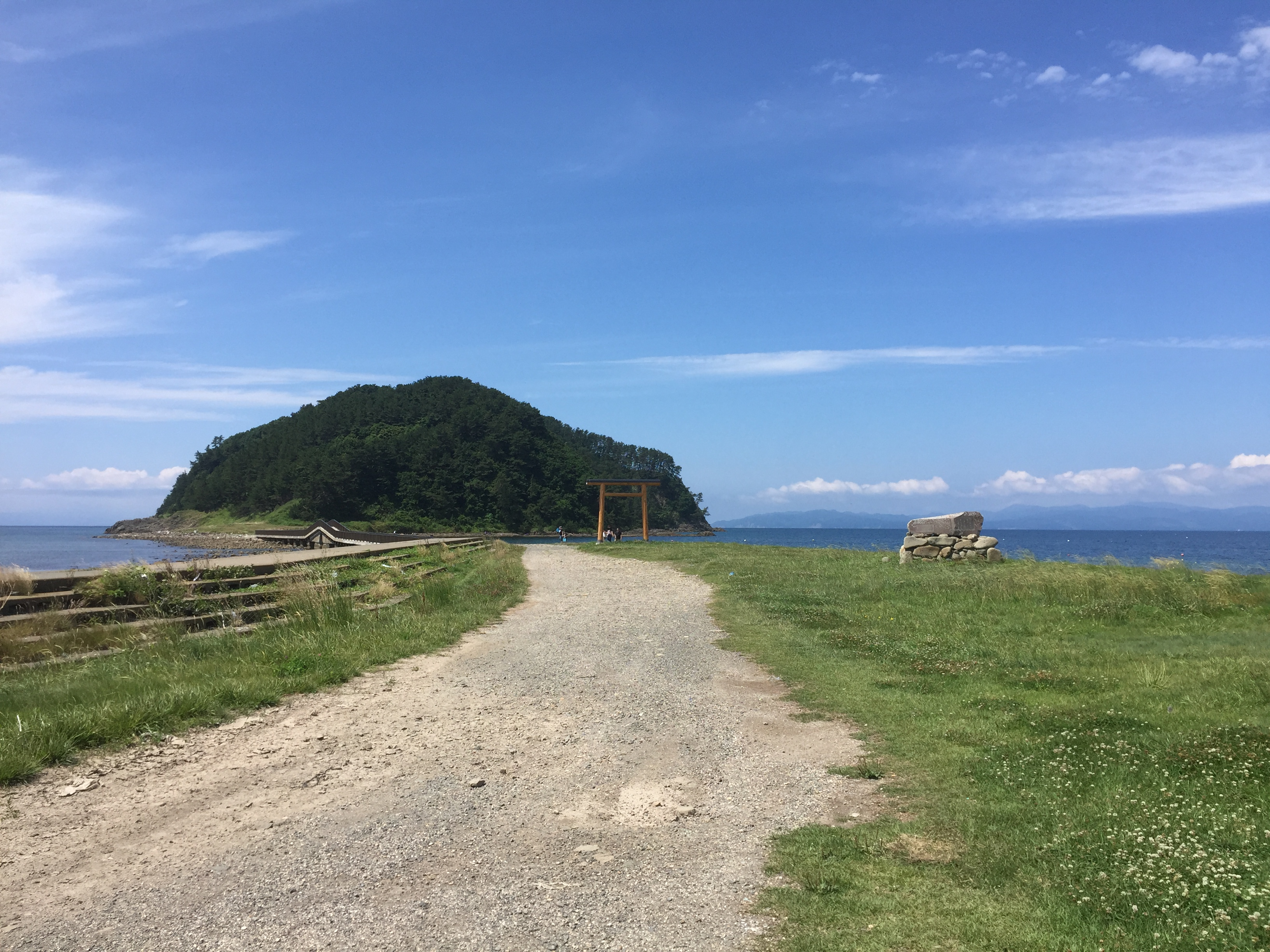
Ōshima Island, part of Asamushi-Natsudomari Prefectural Natural Park, from Natsudomari Peninsula.

Hiranai occupies the Natsudomari Peninsula, the northern end of the Ōu Mountain Range that juts into central Mutsu Bay. The town's population is concentrated near the Japan National Route 4 passing through the east and west of the town and the Aoimori Railway Line (formerly the Tōhoku Main Line). The town office is in the settlement of Kominato, the central part of Hiranai centered around the valley of the Kominato River. The Kominato River begins in the mountains in the south of Hiranai, and flows north through the mountains until it reaches the flat land the town is situated on. After passing through Kominato, it joins the Morita River, which empties into Mutsu Bay shortly after their confluence. The southern part of Hiranai is mainly mountainous. The edges of the town make up the bulk of the Asamushi-Natsudomari Prefectural Natural Park.

=== Climate ===
The town has a cold humid continental climate (Köppen Cfb) characterized by warm short summers and long cold winters with heavy snowfall. The average annual temperature in Hiranai is 9.8 °C. The average annual rainfall is 1262 mm with September as the wettest month. The temperatures are highest on average in August, at around 22.8 °C, and lowest in January, at around -2.0 °C.

Climate data for Hiranai, Aomori
Month	Jan	Feb	Mar	Apr	May	Jun	Jul	Aug	Sep	Oct	Nov	Dec	Year
Mean daily maximum °C (°F)	1.3 (34.3)	1.9 (35.4)	5.8 (42.4)	12.8 (55.0)	18.1 (64.6)	20.8 (69.4)	24.8 (76.6)	26.8 (80.2)	23.2 (73.8)	17.6 (63.7)	10.7 (51.3)	4.4 (39.9)	26.8 (80.2)
Mean daily minimum °C (°F)	−5.2 (22.6)	−5.3 (22.5)	−2.2 (28.0)	2.9 (37.2)	7.8 (46.0)	12.5 (54.5)	17.2 (63.0)	18.9 (66.0)	14.2 (57.6)	7.6 (45.7)	2.3 (36.1)	−2.2 (28.0)	−5.3 (22.5)
Average precipitation mm (inches)	123 (4.8)	95 (3.7)	82 (3.2)	71 (2.8)	81 (3.2)	97 (3.8)	113 (4.4)	110 (4.3)	156 (6.1)	115 (4.5)	108 (4.3)	111 (4.4)	1,262 (49.7)
Source: "NowData - Climate: Hiranai". Climate-Data.org.

=== Neighboring municipalities ===
Aomori Prefecture

- Aomori
- Noheji
- Shichinohe
- Tōhoku

== Government ==
Hiranai has a mayor-council form of government with a directly elected mayor and a unicameral town council of 12 members. In terms of national politics, the town is represented in the Diet of Japan's House of Representatives as a part of the Aomori 1st district.

== Economy ==
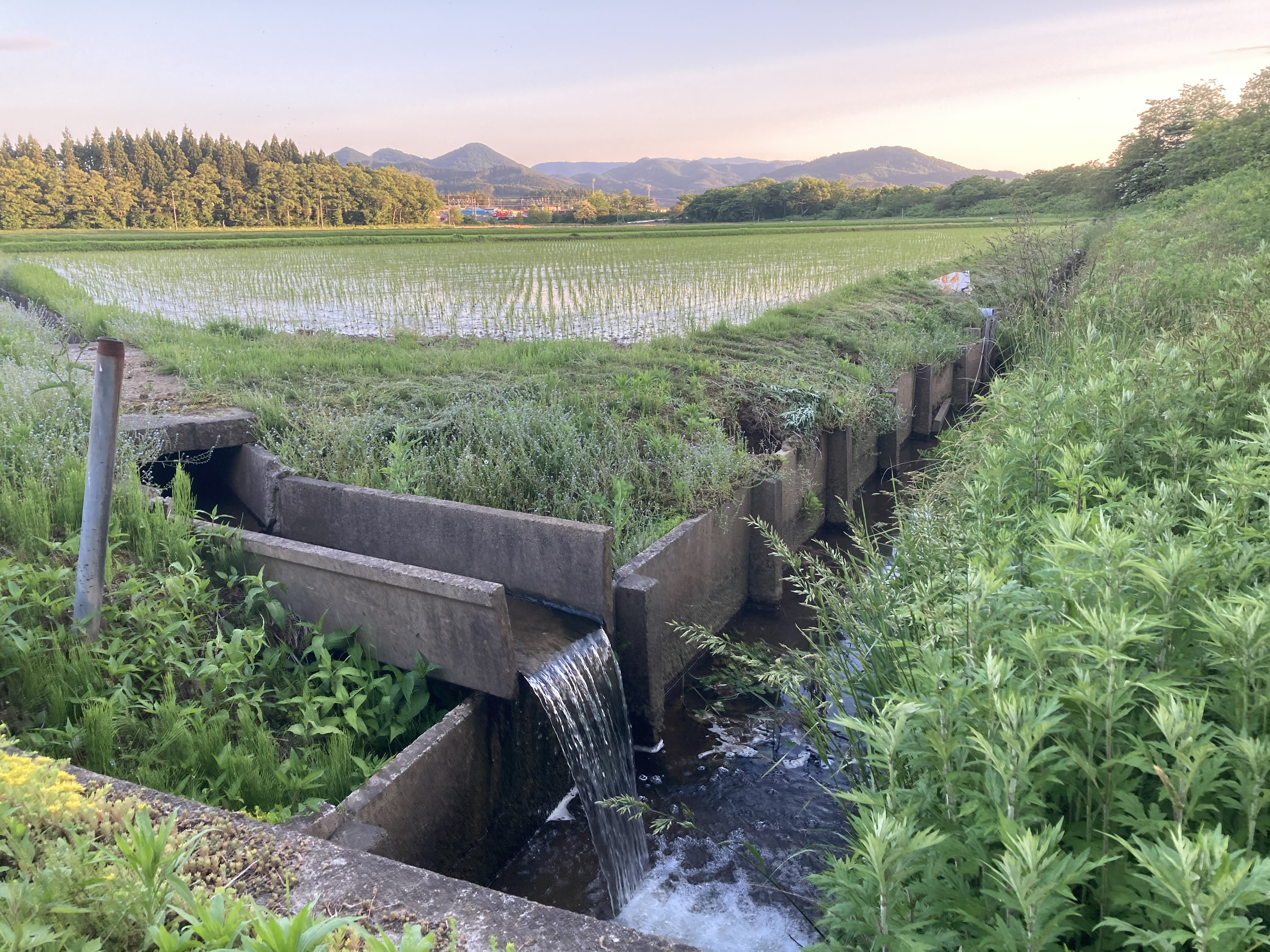
A rice paddy in Hiranai near Kominato Station

The economy of Hiranai is heavily dependent on commercial fishing. Some of the locally caught seafood include sea urchin roe, sea cucumber, scallops, abalone and squid. Paddy fields are present in the lowlands of Hiranai. In 2021, 435 hectares of the town's land area were utilized for the production of crops, chiefly rice. Tourism also plays a role in the economy, with beaches in close proximity to the city of Aomori in summer, ski resorts in winter, and onsen all year drawing tourists.

== Education ==
Hiranai has three public elementary schools and one public middle school operated by the town government. Hiranai formerly had one public high school, the Hiranai branch of Aomori-Higashi High School, operated by the Aomori Prefectural Board of Education, but it was closed in 2021. Following the high school's closure it was designated as a public venue for the deployment of COVID-19 vaccines beginning in April 2021. Following the consolidation of the town's three remaining middle schools into one, the former high school building was repurposed as the sole middle school operated by town's board of education. Hiranai Middle School commenced operations on 7 April 2022 after the completion of renovations on the building.

The town is also home to Shofujuku High School, a privately run school established in 1974 that follows a curriculum based on the beliefs of Shōroku Shintō Yamatoyama. The private school gained national attention for its use of the deprecated Imperial Rescript on Education in its curriculum.

== Transportation ==
=== Railway ===
Aoimori Railway Company - Aoimori Railway Line

- Nishi-Hiranai - Kominato - Shimizugawa - Karibasawa

=== Highway ===
- National Route 4
- National Route 45 (unsigned)
- Aomori Prefecture Route 9
- Aomori Prefecture Route 123
- Aomori Prefecture Route 206
- Aomori Prefecture Route 207
- Aomori Prefecture Route 209
- Aomori Prefecture Route 210
- Aomori Prefecture Route 215
- Aomori Prefecture Route 269

=== Bus ===
- Shimokita Kōtsū
- Kōnan Bus Company (seasonal)
- Aomori City Bus (transferred services to Shimokita Kōtsū in 2004)

== Local attractions ==
- Yogoshiyama Forest Park is run by the town featuring multiple attractions, with more than 3,000 kinds of succulent plants grouped in a large greenhouse of 990 square meters from different parts of the world, including the Americas and Africa. Cacti and flowers of tropical origin bloom year-round. The park also has ski and snowboarding facilities, including a ski lift.
- Asadokoro shallow shore or swan nesting area (浅所海岸, asadokoro kaigan) is the only designated natural monument in Japan for the observation of swans. Tundra swan from Siberia come to the region during the winter. A local legend says that the Tsugaru clan was at risk of losing what would become Hiranai to the Nanbu clan. After the Tsugaru forces prayed for help against the Nanbu, a massive flock of swans appeared. The Nanbu couldn't see the swans, but they mistook their honking for the sound of arriving Tsugaru reinforcements. The Nanbu retreated, preserving the border between the Tsugaru's Kuroishi Domain and the Nanbu's Shichinohe Domain. Hiranai maintains a counter for the amount of swans staying in the area during the winter.

== Notable people from Hiranai ==
- Takahashi Chikuzan - professional Tsugaru-jamisen musician
- Shinkishi Hatai - Biologist
- Toru Hosokawa - professional baseball player for the Chiba Lotte Marines
