= Shimizugawa Station =

Railway station in Hiranai, Aomori Prefecture, Japan

Shimizugawa Station 清水川駅
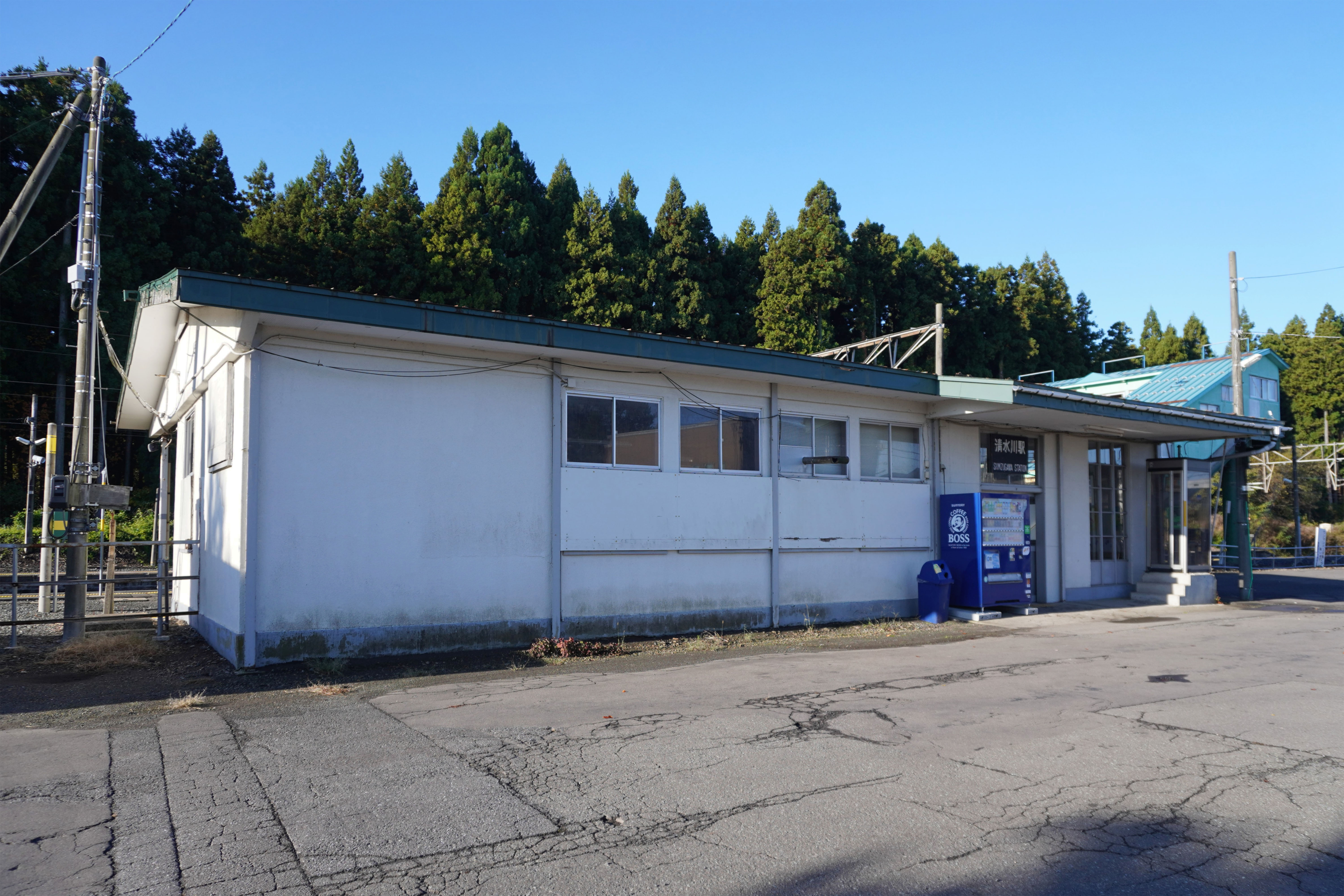
- Shimizugawa Station in October 2023

General information
- Location: 46 Wayama, Shimizugawa, Hiranai, Higashitsugaru District, Aomori Prefecture 039-3332; Japan
- Coordinates: 40°55′18.11″N 141°01′29.29″E
- System: Regional rail station
- Operator: Aoimori Railway
- Line: ■ Aoimori Railway Line
- Distance: 88.5 km from Metoki
- Platforms: 2 side platforms

Other information
- Status: Unstaffed
- Website: Official website

History
- Opened: 4 January 1894

Passengers
- 150 daily boardings (2018)

Services
Preceding station	Aoimori Railway	Following station
Karibasawa towards Metoki	Aoimori Railway Line	Kominato towards Aomori
Location
- Location within Aomori Prefecture Location within Japan

Shimizugawa Station (清水川駅, Shimizugawa-eki) is a railway station in the town of Hiranai, Aomori Prefecture, Japan, operated by the third sector railway operator Aoimori Railway Company.

== Location ==
Shimizugawa Station is served by the Aoimori Railway Line, and is 88.5 kilometers from the terminus of the line at Metoki Station. It is 705.8 kilometers from Tokyo.

=== Surrounding area ===
- Higashi-Hiranai Elementary School
- Higashi-Hiranai Junior High School
- National Route 4

== Station layout ==
Shimizugawa Station has two unnumbered opposing side platforms serving two tracks, connected the station building by a footbridge. The small station building is unattended.

=== Platforms ===
station side	■ Aoimori Railway Line	for Misawa and Hachinohe
opp side	■ Aoimori Railway Line	for Aomori

== History ==
Shimizugawa Station was established on 10 November 1922 as the Shimizugawa Signal. It was elevated to a full station on the Tōhoku Main Line of the Japanese Government Railways (JGR), the pre-war predecessor to the Japan National Railways (JNR), on 20 June 1936. Regularly scheduled freight services were discontinued in April 1962. With the privatization of the JNR on 1 April 1987, the station came under the operational control of East Japan Railway Company (JR East). On 4 December 2010, the Tōhoku Shinkansen was successfully extended north to Shin-Aomori Station from Hachinohe. As a result of the opening of the bullet train between the two stations, that section of the Tōhoku Main Line including this station was transferred to the Aoimori Railway Company from JR East on the same day.

== Services ==
The station is primarily served by trains operating on a local service on the Aoimori Railway Line between Aomori and Hachinohe. It is served by one rapid express train, the 560M train operated jointly by the Aoimori Railway and the Iwate Galaxy Railway between Aomori and Morioka. Passenger trains serve Shimizugawa Station just over 17 hours a day from 6:15 am to 11:16 pm. At peak hours between the first train and 9:08 am, trains depart from the station roughly every 30 minutes; otherwise trains depart at an approximate hourly basis. In 2018, a daily average of 150 passengers boarded trains at Shimizugawa Station, an increase from the daily average of 136 passengers the station served in 2011, the first year of its ownership by the Aoimori Railway Company. In 2018, the station was the sixteenth busiest on the Aoimori Railway Line, excluding Aomori and Hachinohe stations. It is the second busiest station along the Aoimori Railway Line in Hiranai.

== See also ==
- List of railway stations in Japan
