= Karibasawa Station =

Railway station in Hiranai, Aomori Prefecture, Japan

Karibasawa Station 狩場沢駅
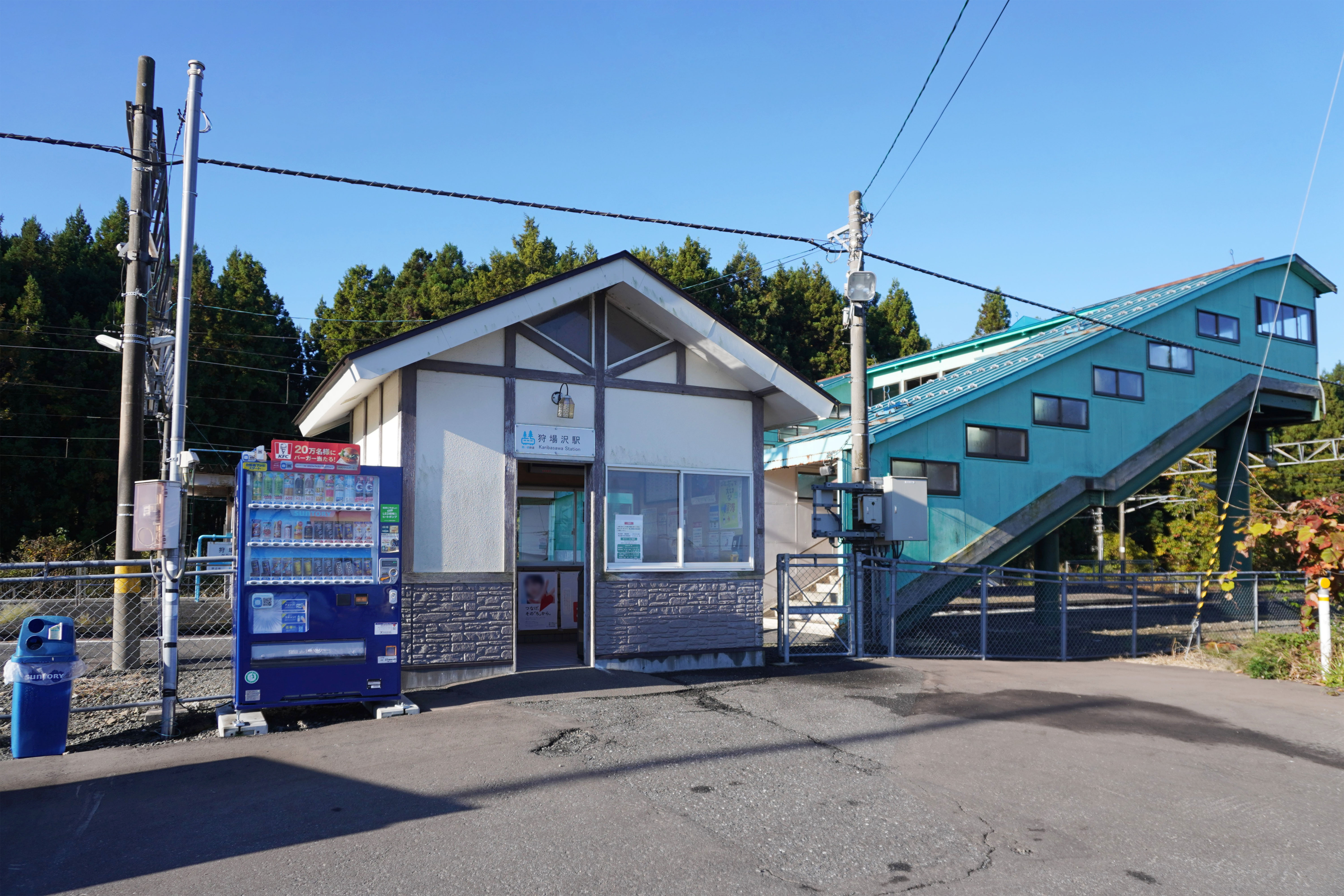
- Karibasawa Station in October 2023

General information
- Location: Karibasawa, Hiranai, Higashitsugaru District, Aomori Prefecture 039-3343; Japan
- Coordinates: 40°54′01.21″N 141°04′16.59″E
- System: Regional rail station
- Operator: Aoimori Railway
- Line: ■ Aoimori Railway Line
- Distance: 83.8 km from Metoki
- Platforms: 1 island + 1 side platform

Other information
- Status: Unstaffed
- Website: Official website

History
- Opened: 4 January 1894

Services
Preceding station	Aoimori Railway	Following station
Noheji towards Metoki	Aoimori Railway Line	Shimizugawa towards Aomori
Location
- Location within Aomori Prefecture Location within Japan

Karibasawa Station (狩場沢駅, Karibasawa-eki) is a railway station in the town of Hiranai in Aomori Prefecture, Japan, operated by the third sector railway operator Aoimori Railway Company.

== Lines ==
Karibasawa Station is served by the Aoimori Railway Line, and is 83.8 kilometers from the terminus of the line at Metoki Station. It is 701.1 kilometers from Tokyo.

== Station layout ==
Karibasawa Station has two opposite side platforms connected to the station building by a footbridge. The small station building is unattended.

=== Platforms ===
station side	■ Aoimori Railway Line	for Misawa and Hachinohe
opp side	■ Aoimori Railway Line	for Aomori

== History ==
Karibasawa Station was opened on 4 January 1894 as a station on the Nippon Railway. It became a station on the Tōhoku Main Line of the Japanese Government Railways (JGR), the pre-war predecessor to the Japan National Railways (JNR), after the nationalization of the Nippon Railway on November 1, 1906. Regularly scheduled freight services were discontinued in February 1962. With the privatization of the JNR on April 1, 1987, the station came under the operational control of East Japan Railway Company (JR East).

The section of the Tōhoku Main Line including this station was transferred to Aoimori Railway on December 4, 2010.

== Surrounding area ==
- Noheji Port
- National Route 4

== See also ==
- List of railway stations in Japan
