= Akōbō Kofun Cluster =

Kofun period burial mounds in Oirase, Japan

Akōbō Kofun Group
- 阿光坊古墳群 (Japanese)
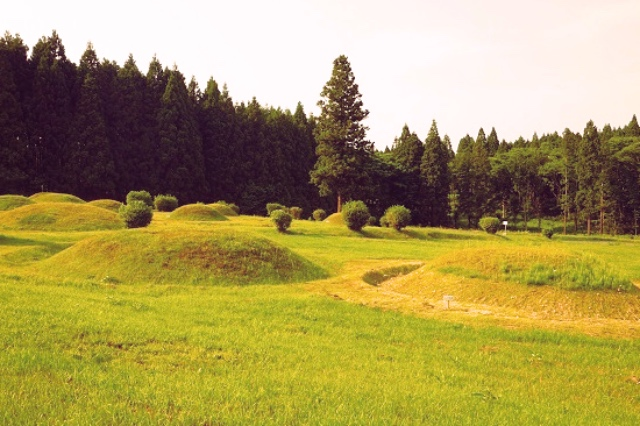
- Akōbō Kofun group

- Akōbō Kofun group Akōbō Kofun Cluster (Japan)
- 40°36′28″N 141°22′40″E
- Type: kofun
- Periods: Late Kofun period
- Location: Oirase, Aomori, Japan
- Region: Tōhoku region

History
- Built: 7th to 9th century AD

Site notes
- Elevation: 30 m (98 ft)
- Area: 112,738 m^{2} (1,213,500 sq ft)
- Excavation dates: 1989-1990
- Archaeologists: Oirase Town Board of Education
- Public access: Yes (museum on site)
- National Historic Site of Japan

The Akōbō Kofun group (阿光坊古墳群, Akōbō kofun-gun) is a large group of circular kofun burial mounds located in the Akobo neighborhood of the town of Oirase, in Kamikita District of Aomori Prefecture in the far northern Tōhoku region of Japan. It has protected by the central government as a National Historic Site since July 29, 2007 .

== Overview ==
Located on a river terrace on the left bank of the Oirase River, approximately seven kilometers from the present-day Pacific coast at an elevation of 30 to 40 meters above sea level, this group of ancient tombs was variously known as the "Tenjinyama site" or the "Jusanmori site", and was believed by locals in pre-modern times to contain the graves of warriors, as evidenced by occasional fragments of swords and pottery which were uncovered by plowing nearby fields.

After the discovery of magatama beads by farmers in April 1986, the site was extensively excavated between 1989 and 1990 by the local Oirase Town Board of Education, at which time 14 burial mounds (twelve with moats) were discovered. Subsequent excavations from 1999 to 2006 confirmed that there were at least 108 domed kofun with moats and eight more without moats. The size of each tumulus was approximately ten meters in diameter, with a height of 1.1 meter, containing a two-by-one meter grave pit which is estimated would have held a wooden coffin. The moats were one to 2.5 meters in width and were shallow. In addition to the pottery offerings placed on the surrounding moat and on the mound, grave goods discovered inside the grave pits included the remnants of iron swords, iron arrowheads, agricultural tools, beads and other jewelry articles, Haji pottery, and horse harnesses and the remains of wooden sarcophagus. Many of the items appear to have originated from the southern part of the Tōhoku region, indicating frequent trade. These artifacts dated from the first half of the 7th century to the early 9th century AD. During this time period, northern Honshu was not under the control of the Yamato Kingdom and are thus thought to be the graves of Emishi chieftains. Similar tumuli have been found in other parts of the northern Tōhoku region and the Ishikari Plain in southern Hokkaido. As the mounds are now flattened and do not appear above the present ground-level, a possibility exists that more undiscovered tombs exist in the area.

Approximately three kilometers east of this necropolis is the Nakanodaira archeological site, where more than 100 pit dwellings were discovered. The Negishi archeological site, which was the site of a large pit dwelling, was also nearby, suggesting that the people who lived in the locations had some relationship with the construction of the tombs.

In 2016, the town of Oirase completed construction of a local museum at the site. It is located approximately 10 minutes by car from the Aoimori Railway Mukaiyama Station.

== See also ==
- List of Historic Sites of Japan (Aomori)
