= Shimoda =

Shimoda may refer to:

== Places in Japan ==
- Shimoda, Shizuoka, a city in Shizuoka Prefecture
  - Shimoda Ropeway, an aerial tramway which climbs Mount Nesugata
- Shimoda, Aomori, a town in Aomori Prefecture
- Shimoda Station, a railway station in Oirase, Aomori Prefecture

== Other uses ==
- Shimoda (surname), a Japanese surname
- Siege of Shimoda (1590), in Shimoda, Shizuoka
- Shimoda bugyō, 19th-century Japanese title equivalent to commissioner, overseer or governor
- Shimoda Conference, series of unofficial dialogues between the United States and Japan
- Treaty of Shimoda (1855), between Japan and Russia

== See also ==
- Ryuichi Shimoda v. The State, a court case by a group of five survivors of the atomic attacks on Hiroshima and Nagasaki
- The Judith of Shimoda, a play attributed to Bertolt Brecht
