= Shimoda, Aomori =

Shimoda 下田町
- Former municipality
- Flag Seal

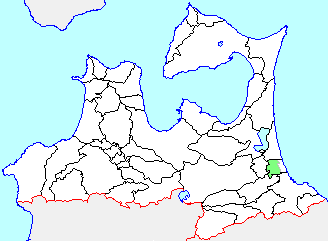
- Location of Shimoda in Aomori Prefecture

- Location in Japan
- Coordinates: 40°35′56.50″N 141°23′51.4″E
- Country: Japan
- Region: Tōhoku
- Prefecture: Aomori Prefecture
- District: Kamikita
- Merged: March 1, 2006 (now part of Oirase)

Area
  - Total: 50.44 km^{2} (19.47 sq mi)

Population (February 1, 2006)
  - Total: 14,282
  - Density: 283/km^{2} (730/sq mi)
- Time zone: UTC+09:00 (JST)
- Symbols
- Bird: swan
- Flower: Rhododendron
- Tree: Ginkgo

Shimoda (下田町, Shimoda-machi) was a town located in Kamikita District in central Aomori Prefecture, Japan.

== History ==
Shimoda Village was founded on April 1, 1889. On August 1, 1969 it was elevated to town status.

On March 1, 2006 Shimoda, along with the neighboring town of Momoishi (also from Kamikita District), was merged to create the town of Oirase, and thus it no longer exists as an independent municipality.

== Economy ==
Located inland in central Aomori Prefecture and along the Oirase River, the town had an agriculture-based economy based on the production of rice, carrots, and Japanese yams. The town also served as a bed town for nearby Misawa. The former town also continues to host AEON Group and Jusco and large-scale shopping centers, expanding the town's commercial base.

== Population ==
At the time of its merger, the town had an estimated population of 14,282 and a density of 283 persons per km^{2}. The total area was 50.44 km^{2}.

== Transportation ==
Shimoda was served by the National Route 45 highway, and by Shimoda Station and Mukaiyama Station on the Tōhoku Main Line railway.
