= Sadayuki =

- Gender: Male

Origin
- Origin: Japanese
- Meaning: Different meanings depending on the kanji used

Sadayuki (written: 貞行 or 定行) is a masculine Japanese given name. Notable people with the name include:

- Ōhikari Sadayuki (大晃 定行; 1927–1996), Japanese sumo wrestler
- Wainai Sadayuki (和井内 貞行; 1858–1922), Japanese businessman
- Hōjō Sadayuki (北条 貞将; 1302–1333), Japanese samurai
- Usami Sadayuki ((宇佐美 定行; 1489–1564), Japanese samurai
- Matsudaira Sadayuki ((松平 定行; 1587–1668), Japanese daimyo

== See also ==
- 48624 Sadayuki, a main-belt asteroid
