= Oirase =

Oirase おいらせ町
- Town
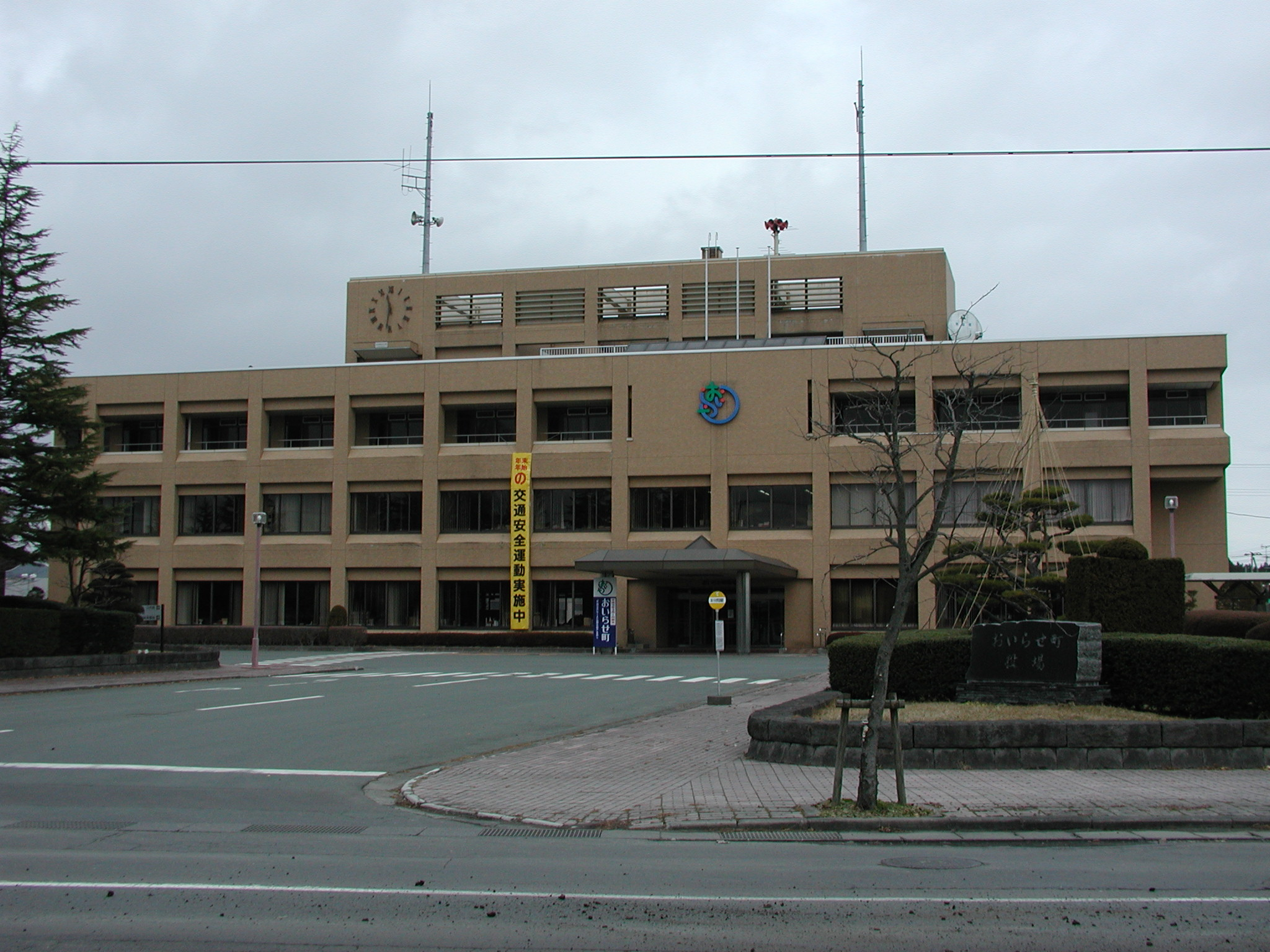
- Oirase Town Hall

- Flag Seal
- Location of Oirase in Aomori Prefecture

- Coordinates: 40°35′57″N 141°23′52″E
- Country: Japan
- Region: Tōhoku
- Prefecture: Aomori
- District: Kamikita

Area
  - Total: 71.96 km^{2} (27.78 sq mi)

Population (December 31, 2025)
  - Total: 25,026
  - Density: 347.8/km^{2} (900.7/sq mi)
- Time zone: UTC+9 (Japan Standard Time)
- Phone number: 0178-56-2111
- Address: Naka-Shimoda 135-2, Oirase-machi, Kitakami-gun, Aomori-ken 039-2192
- Website: Official website
- Symbols
- Bird: Swan
- Flower: Sakura
- Mascot: Oira-kun
- Tree: Ginkgo biloba

Oirase (おいらせ町, Oirase-chō) is a town located in Aomori Prefecture, Japan. As of 31 December 2025, the town had an estimated population of 25,026 in 11218 households, and a population density of 348 persons per km^{2}. The total area of the town is 71.96 square kilometres (27.78 sq mi).

== Geography ==
Oirase is located on the eastern coastline of Aomori Prefecture, facing the Pacific Ocean. The land is mostly flat or slightly hilly. The Oirase River, which is the origin of the town's name, flows from west to east, with Lake Towada as its source.

=== Neighbouring municipalities ===
Aomori Prefecture

- Gonohe
- Hachinohe
- Misawa
- Rokunohe

=== Climate ===
The town has a cold maritime climate characterized by cool short summers and long cold winters with heavy snowfall (Köppen climate classification Cfa). The average annual temperature in Oirase is 10.2 °C. The average annual rainfall is 1158 mm with September as the wettest month. The temperatures are highest on average in August, at around 22.8 °C, and lowest in January, at around -1.6 °C.

== Demographics ==
Per Japanese census data, the population of Oirase has steadily increased over the past 40 years.

Historical population
Year	Pop.	±% p.a.
1950	15,958	—
1960	17,709	+1.05%
1970	17,036	−0.39%
1980	17,637	+0.35%
1990	19,120	+0.81%
2000	23,220	+1.96%
2010	24,188	+0.41%
2020	24,273	+0.04%

== History ==
During the Edo period, the area around Oirase was controlled by the Nambu clan of Morioka Domain, becoming part of the territories of Shichinohe Domain in the latter half of the Edo period. In the post-Meiji Restoration establishment of the modern municipalities system on 1 April 1889, the villages of Momoishi and Shimoda were created. Monoishi was elevated to town status on April 20, 1929, and Shimoda on August 1, 1969. The town of Oirase was established by the merger of the former towns of Momoishi and Shimoda, on March 1, 2006. The town was named after the Oirase River.

== Government ==
Oirase has a mayor-council form of government with a directly elected mayor and a unicameral town council of 16 members. Oirase is part of Kamikita District which contributes four members to the Aomori Prefectural Assembly. In terms of national politics, the town is part of Aomori 2nd district of the lower house of the Diet of Japan.

== Economy ==
The economy of Oirase is heavily dependent on agriculture, with main crops including rice, strawberries, Japanese yam and carrots. The town has become commercially more vibrant with the construction of AEON Group, Jusco Shopping center in 1995 and the spin-off retailing this has attracted. The major local industry is Momokawa Brewing, Inc, a nationally known sake brewer. Oirase also serves as a bedroom community for the nearby cities of Misawa and Hachinohe.

== Education ==
Oirase has five public elementary schools and three public middle schools operated by the town government. The town has one public high school operated by the Aomori Prefectural Board of Education.

== Transportation ==
=== Railway ===
Aoimori Railway Company - Aoimori Railway Line

- Shimoda - Mukaiyama

=== Highway ===
- Momoishi Road
- Second Michinoku Toll Road
- National Route 45
- National Route 338

== Local attractions ==
- Akōbō Kofun Cluster, a Kofun period National Historic Site
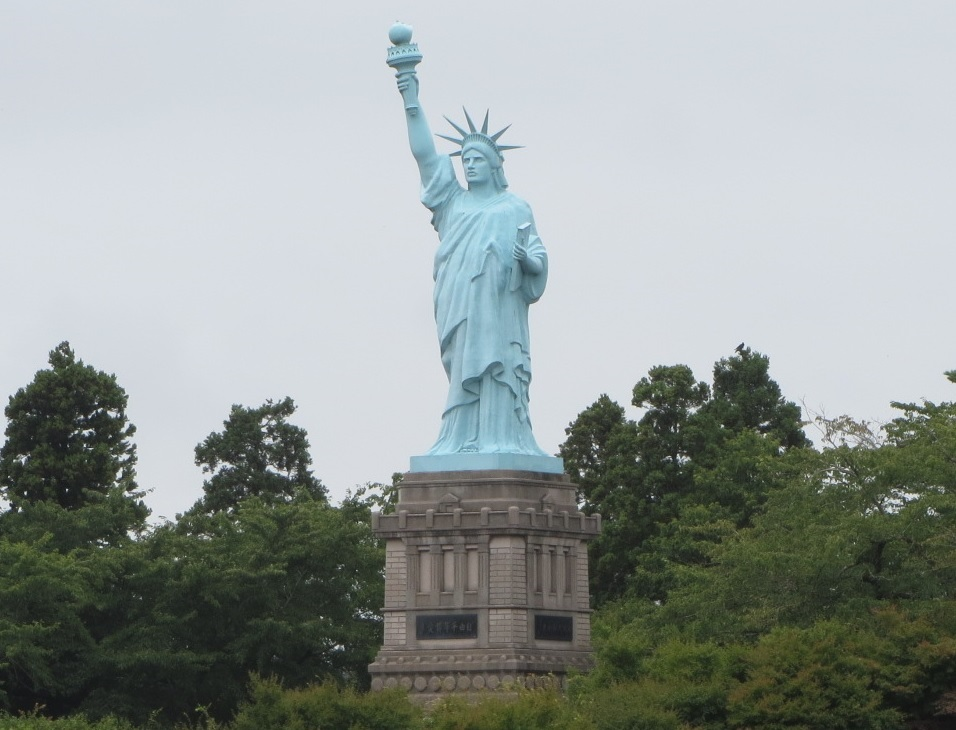
The statue of liberty in Icho Park

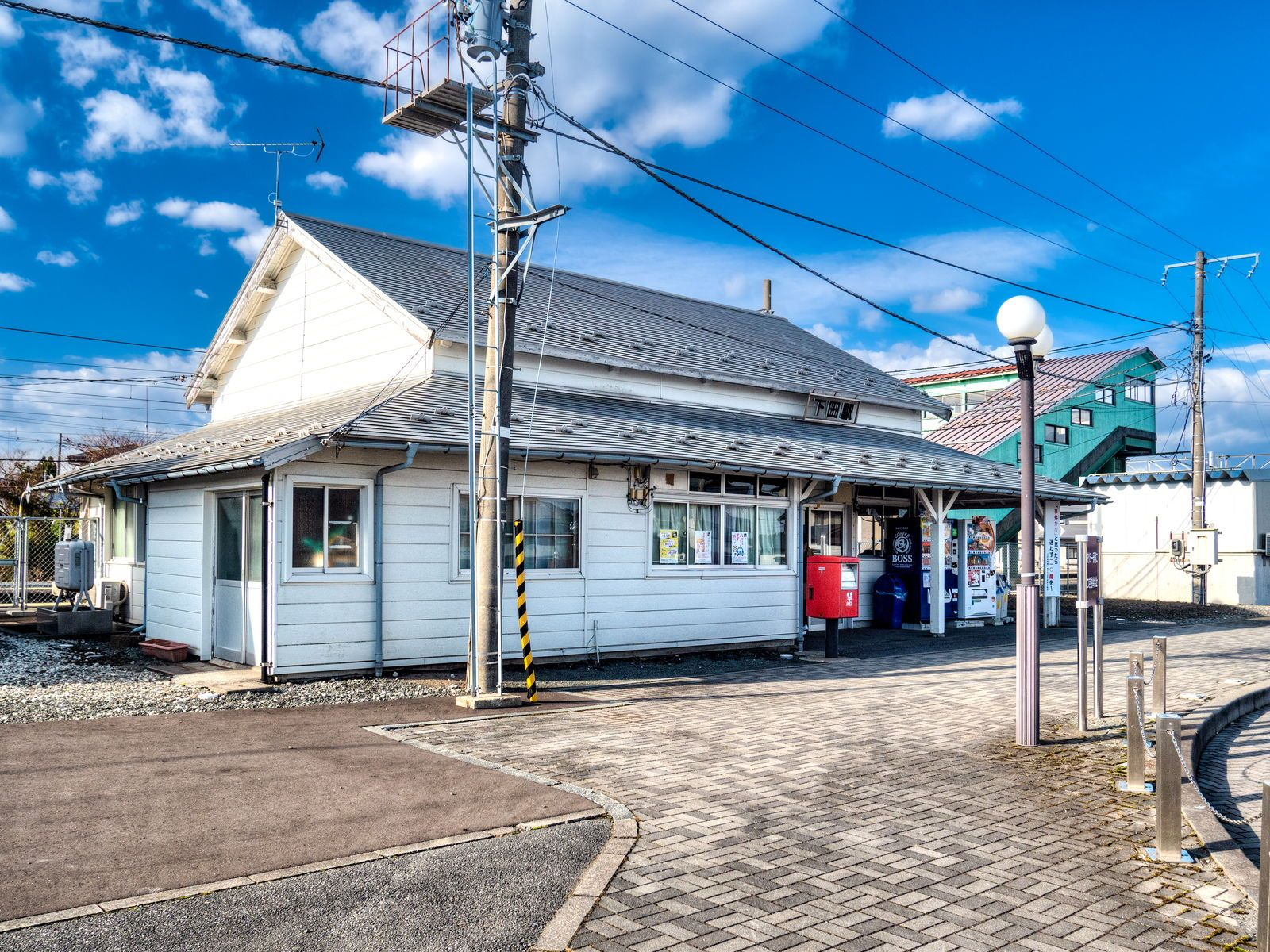
Shimoda train station

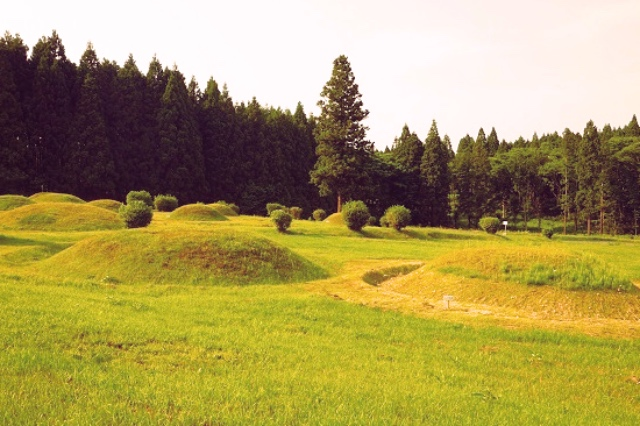
Akobo Kofun cluster

== Noted people from Oirase ==
- Shingo Mimura, politician
