= Sōichirō Miyashita =

Japanese politician

- 宮下 宗一郎
- Miyashita in 2025

Governor of Aomori Prefecture
- Incumbent
- Assumed office 29 June 2023
- Monarch: Naruhito
- Preceded by: Shingo Mimura

Mayor of Mutsu
- In office 29 June 2014 – 3 March 2023
- Preceded by: Junichiro Miyashita
- Succeeded by: Tomoya Yamamoto

Personal details
- Born: 12 May 1974 (age 52) Mutsu, Aomori, Japan
- Party: Independent
- Education: Aomori High School
- Alma mater: Tohoku University
- Profession: Politician

Sōichirō Miyashita (宮下 宗一郎, Miyashita Sōichirō; born 12 May 1974) is a Japanese politician currently serving as the governor of Aomori Prefecture since 2023. Prior to being elected governor, he served as mayor of Mutsu for 3 terms from 2014 to 2023.

Before his involvement in electoral politics, Miyashita worked for the Ministry of Land, Infrastructure, Transport and Tourism and was employed at the Consulate General of Japan, New York City.

== Early life ==
Sōichirō Miyashita was born on 12 May 1974 in Mutsu, Aomori Prefecture. He attended Aomori High School, upon graduation, he attended Tohoku University, achieving a degree in law.

== Work as Government Official ==
Upon graduating from university, Miyashita was employed by the Ministry of Land, Infrastructure, Transport and Tourism and oversaw the Tohoku Regional Development Bureau. In June 2012, he began working with the Ministry of Foreign Affairs, where he served at the Consulate General of Japan, New York City as head of the Political and Economic Affairs Division.

== Mayor of Mutsu ==
On 19 May 2014, his father, Junichiro Miyashita, mayor of Mutsu City, died of a subarachnoid hemorrhage. Sōichirō Miyashita would then run to succeed his father as mayor. He won the election with 21,844 votes. Miyashita ran unopposed in both the 2018 and 2022 mayoral elections.

On 3 March 2023, Miyashita resigned as mayor in order to pursue his candidacy in the 2023 Aomori gubernatorial election.

== Governor of Aomori Prefecture ==
While serving as mayor of Mutsu, Miyashita had announced his candidacy for the 2023 Aomori gubernatorial election on 6 January 2023 at a press conference meeting. In the election, Miyashita achieved a victory over his opponent, former mayor of Aomori City, Akihiko Onodera. Miyashita ran as an independent without backing from any political party.

Miyashita was inaugurated as governor on 29 June 2023.
