= Shingo Mimura =

Japanese politician

- 三村 申吾

Governor of Aomori Prefecture
- In office 29 June 2003 – 28 June 2023
- Monarchs: Akihito; Naruhito
- Preceded by: Morio Kimura
- Succeeded by: Sōichirō Miyashita

Member of the House of Representatives
- In office 25 June 2000 – 12 June 2003
- Preceded by: Akinori Eto
- Succeeded by: Akinori Eto
- Constituency: Aomori 2nd

Mayor of Momoishi
- In office 1992–1996

Personal details
- Born: 16 April 1956 (age 70) Momoishi, Aomori, Japan (present day Oirase)
- Party: Independent
- Other political affiliations: New Frontier
- Education: University of Tokyo
- Website: Official Website

Shingo Mimura (三村申吾, Mimura Shingo; born 16 April 1956) is a Japanese politician who served as Governor of Aomori Prefecture for five terms, from 29 June 2003 to 28 June 2023. He previously served as a member of House of Representatives from June 2000 to June 2003 from Aomori 2nd ward. He also served as a Mayor of his hometown Momoishi, Aomori from the year 1992 to 1996.
