= Towadako, Aomori =

Towadako 十和田湖町
- Former municipality
- Flag Seal

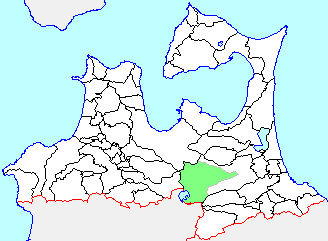
- Location of Towadako in Aomori Prefecture

- Location in Japan
- Coordinates: 40°35′11.3″N 141°06′32.4″E
- Country: Japan
- Region: Tōhoku
- Prefecture: Aomori Prefecture
- District: Kamikita
- Merged: March 1, 2005 (now part of Towada)

Area
  - Total: 372.2 km^{2} (143.7 sq mi)

Population (January 1, 2005)
  - Total: 9,834
  - Density: 26.42/km^{2} (68.4/sq mi)
- Time zone: UTC+09:00 (JST)
- Website: City of Towada
- Symbols
- Bird: Mandarin duck
- Flower: Shakunage
- Tree: Japanese rowan

Towadako (十和田湖町, Towadako-machi) was a town located in Kamikita District in central Aomori Prefecture, Japan.

Located in south-central Aomori Prefecture, and encompassing the Aomori shoreline of Lake Towada, the town of Towadako had an economy based on tourism, forestry and agriculture.

At the time of its merger, the town had an estimated population of 9,834 and a density of 26.42 persons per km^{2}. The total area was 372.2 km^{2}.

Towadako was served by Japan National Route 102 highway, but had no railway service.

== History ==
Hōosawa Village was founded in 1889 from the merger of the hamlets of Hōryō, Oirase, and Sawada. It changed its name to Towada Village in 1931 and was elevated to town status in 1955. In April 1975, it changed its name to Towadako Town. On January 1, 2005, Towadako was merged into the neighboring city of Towada, and thus it no longer exists as an independent municipality.
