= Mutsu-Ichikawa Station =

Railway station in Hachinohe, Aomori Prefecture, Japan

Mutsu-Ichikawa Station 陸奥市川駅
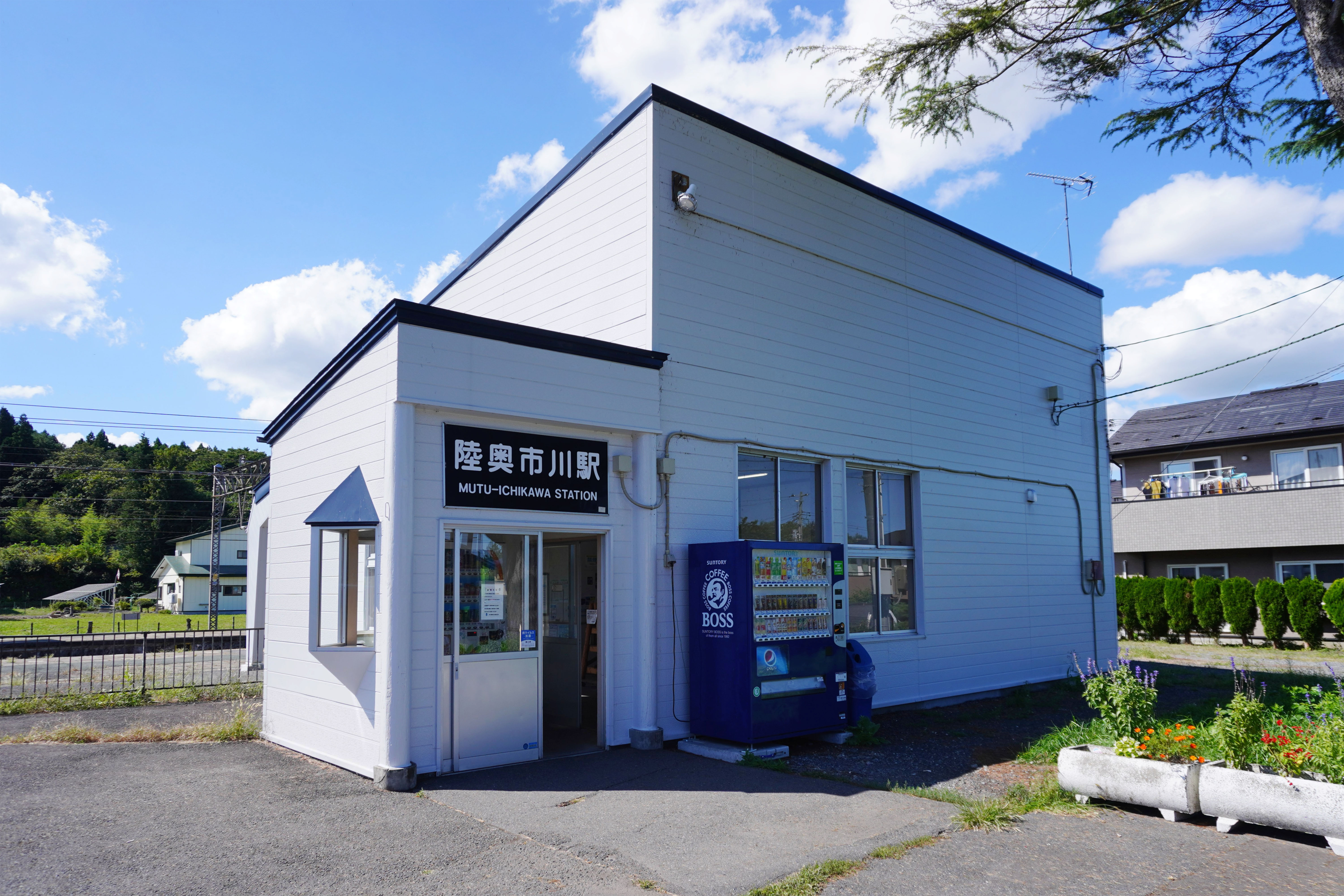
- Mutsu-Ichikawa Station in September 2023

General information
- Location: Ichikawamachi, Hachinohe-shi, Aomori-ken 039-2241; Japan
- Coordinates: 40°33′47.65″N 141°26′21.51″E
- System: Regional rail station
- Operator: Aoimori Railway
- Line: ■ Aoimori Railway Line
- Distance: 32.8 km from Metoki
- Platforms: 1 island + 1 side platform
- Tracks: 3
- Connections: Bus stop

Construction
- Structure type: At grade

Other information
- Status: Unstaffed
- Website: Official website

History
- Opened: November 11, 1944

Services
| Preceding station | Aoimori Railway | Following station |
|---|---|---|
| Hachinohe towards Metoki | Aoimori Railway Line | Shimoda towards Aomori |
Location
- Location within Aomori Prefecture Location within Japan

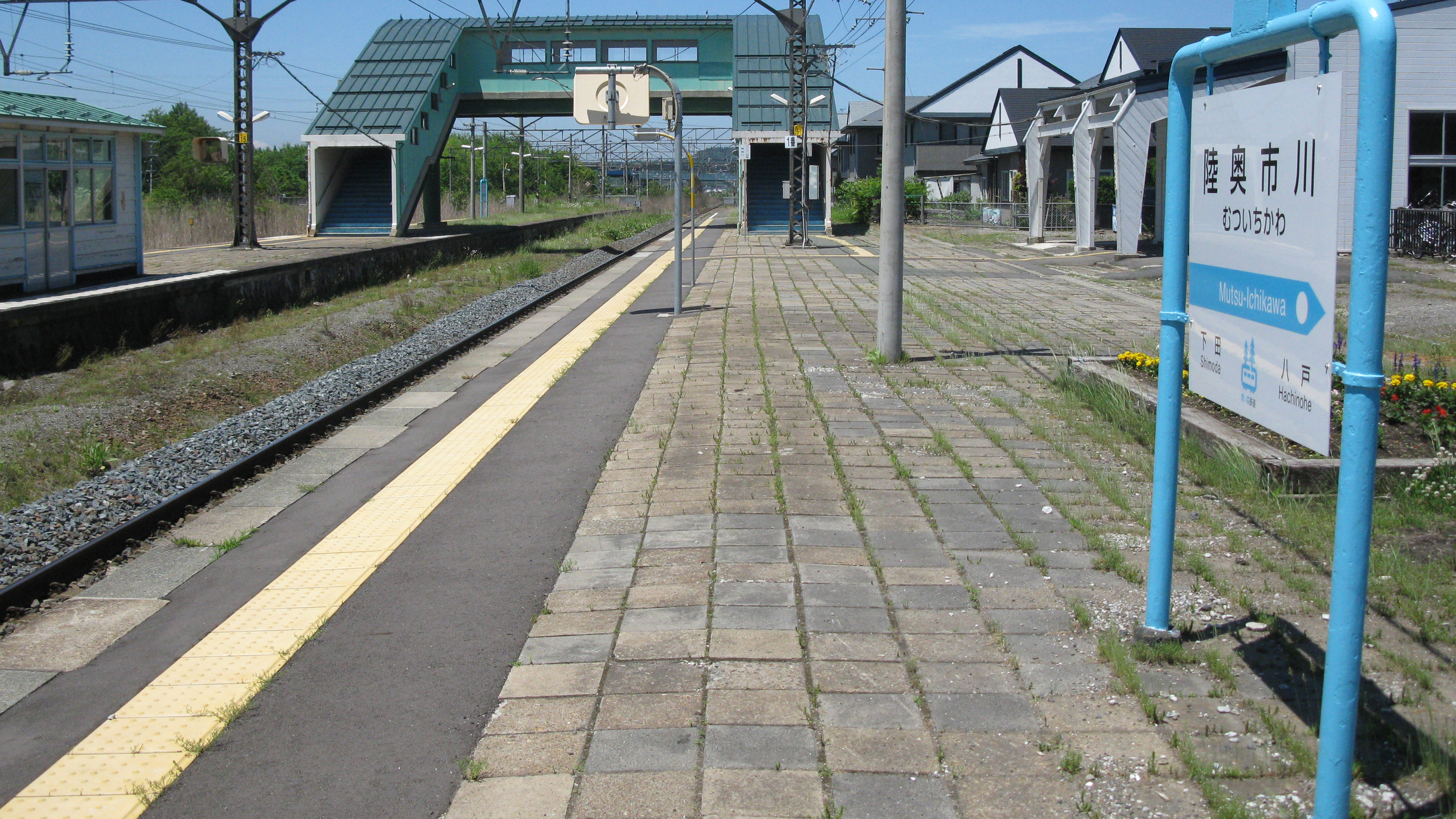
Platforms of Mutsu-Ichikawa Station

Mutsu-Ichikawa Station (陸奥市川駅, Mutsu Ichikawa-eki) is a railway station on the Aoimori Railway Line in the city of Hachinohe in Aomori Prefecture, Japan, operated by the third sector railway operator Aoimori Railway Company.

== Lines ==
Mutsu-Ichikawa Station is served by the Aoimori Railway Line, one stop away from Hachinohe Station, and is 32.8 kilometers from the terminus of the line at Metoki Station. It is 650.1 kilometers from Tokyo Station.

== Station layout ==
Mutsu Ichikawa Station has a one ground-level island platform and one ground-level side platform serving three tracks connected to the station building by a footbridge. However, only tracks 1 and 3 are in use, and the rails for track 2 have been pulled up, giving the station an effective structure of two opposed side platforms. The small station building is unstaffed.

=== Platforms ===
| 1 | ■ Aoimori Railway Line | for Sannohe and Hachinohe |
| 3 | ■ Aoimori Railway Line | for Misawa, Noheji and Aomori |

== History ==
Mutsu-Ichikawa Station was opened on November 5, 1926 as the Todoroki Signal (轟信号場, Todoroki shingōjō) on the Tōhoku Main Line. It was elevated in status to a full station on the Japanese Government Railways (JGR), the pre-war predecessor to the Japan National Railways (JNR), on November 11, 1944 and given its present name at the same time. Regularly scheduled freight services were discontinued in October 1971, and the station has been managed from Hachinohe Station since February 1985. With the privatization of the JNR on April 1, 1987, it came under the operational control of East Japan Railway Company (JR East).

The section of the Tōhoku Main Line including this station was transferred to Aoimori Railway on December 4, 2010. The station has been unattended since 1999.

== Surrounding area ==
- JGSDF Camp Hachinohe
- JMSDF Hachinohe Air Base

== See also ==
- List of railway stations in Japan

== Bibliography ==
- JTB Timetable December 2010 issue
