= Kyōichi Sawada =

Japanese photojournalist (1936–1970)

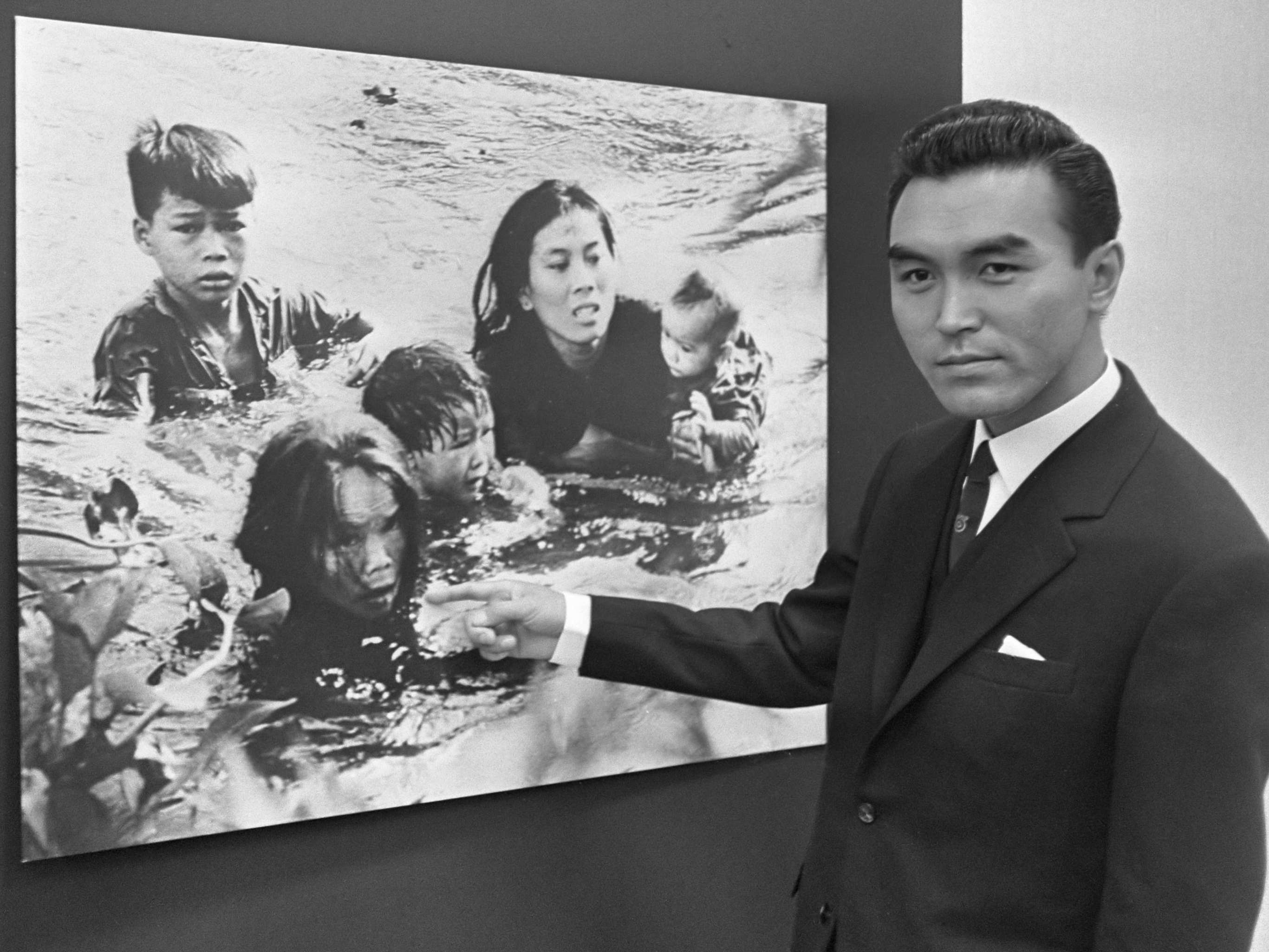
- Kyōichi Sawada (1965), and his work "Flight To Safety"
- Born: February 22, 1936; Aomori City, Aomori Prefecture, Japan
- Died: October 28, 1970 (aged 34); Cambodia
- Occupation: War photographer
- Known for: Photographs of the Vietnam War

Kyōichi Sawada (沢田 教一, Sawada Kyōichi; February 22, 1936 – October 28, 1970) was a Japanese photographer with United Press International who received a Pulitzer Prize for war photography.

== Early life ==
Sawada was born in Aomori, Japan and graduated from Aomori High School. He bought his first camera at age 13 with money he earned from delivering newspapers. After high school he worked at a camera shop on the United States Misawa Air Base in Aomori Prefecture.

== Combat photography ==
Sawada became a war photographer with UPI, and received the 1966 Pulitzer Prize for Photography for his combat photography of the Vietnam War during 1965. His photograph "Flight To Safety" was selected as 1965 "World Press Photo of the Year". It shows a Vietnamese mother and children wading across a river to escape a US bombing.

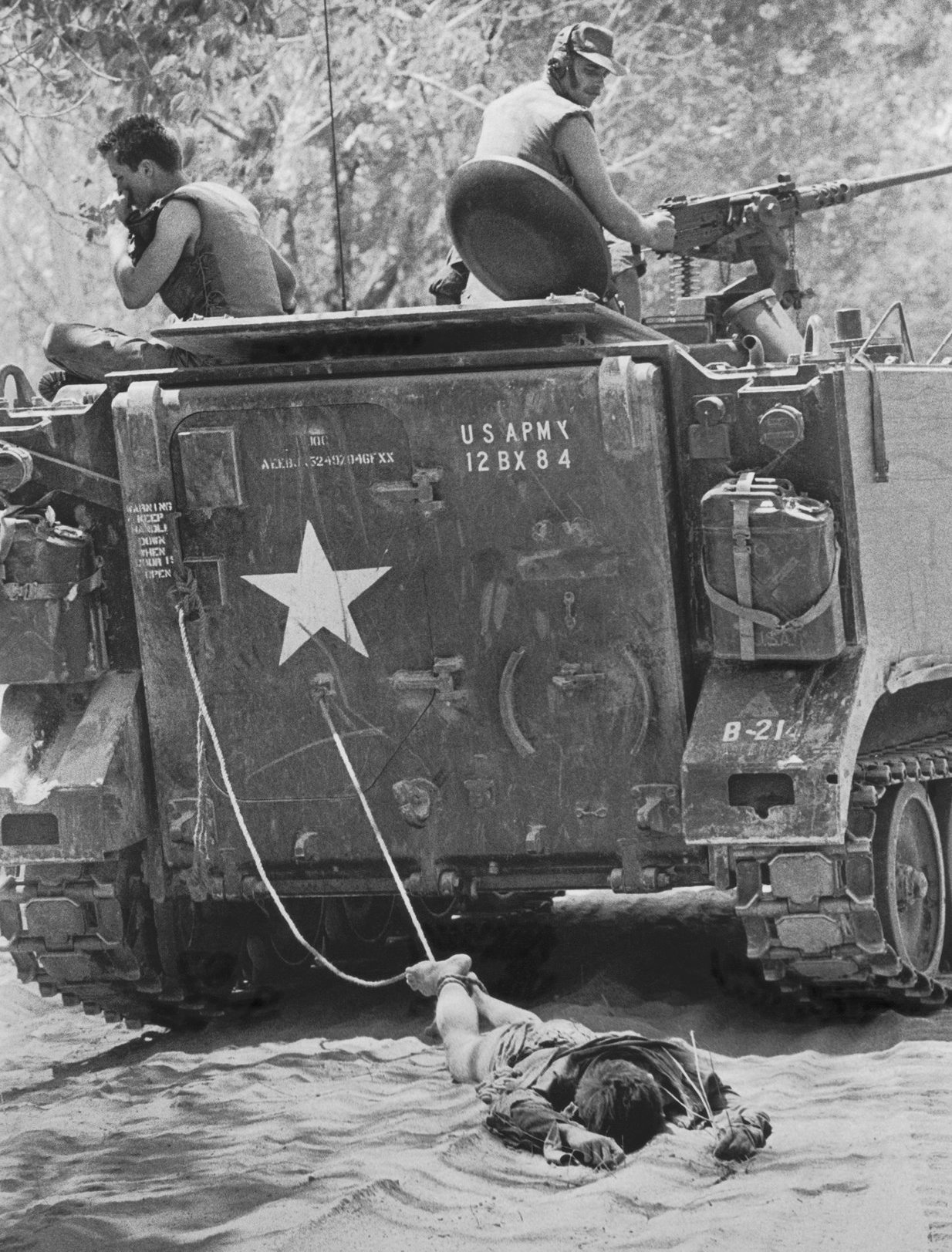
"Dusty Death", Sawada's 1966 photo that won the World Press Photo of the Year

His 1966 photograph "Dusty Death" also won World Press Photo of the Year. It shows U.S soldiers of the 1st Infantry Division dragging a dead Viet Cong fighter to a burial site behind their M113 armored personnel carrier, after he was killed during a fierce night attack by several Viet Cong battalions against Australian forces during the Battle of Suoi Bong Trang on 24 February 1966.

He also documented the Battle of Hue in 1968, for example, capturing an image of Lance Corporal Don Hammons immediately after being wounded by enemy fire; Hammons died minutes later.

== Death ==
On October 28, 1970, Sawada and Frank Frosch, UPI Phnom Penh branch chief, were ambushed by unknown assailants and assassinated while returning to Phnom Penh by car from a news-gathering outing to Takéo Province. The bodies of the two men were found abandoned in a rice paddy near the road, riddled with bullet holes. No blood or bullet holes were found in their car, suggesting that they had been dragged from their vehicle and killed execution-style. There was no chance they had been mistaken for soldiers since they were driving in a civilian car and were wearing brightly colored civilian clothing.
