= Aomori High School =

- 青森県立青森高等学校
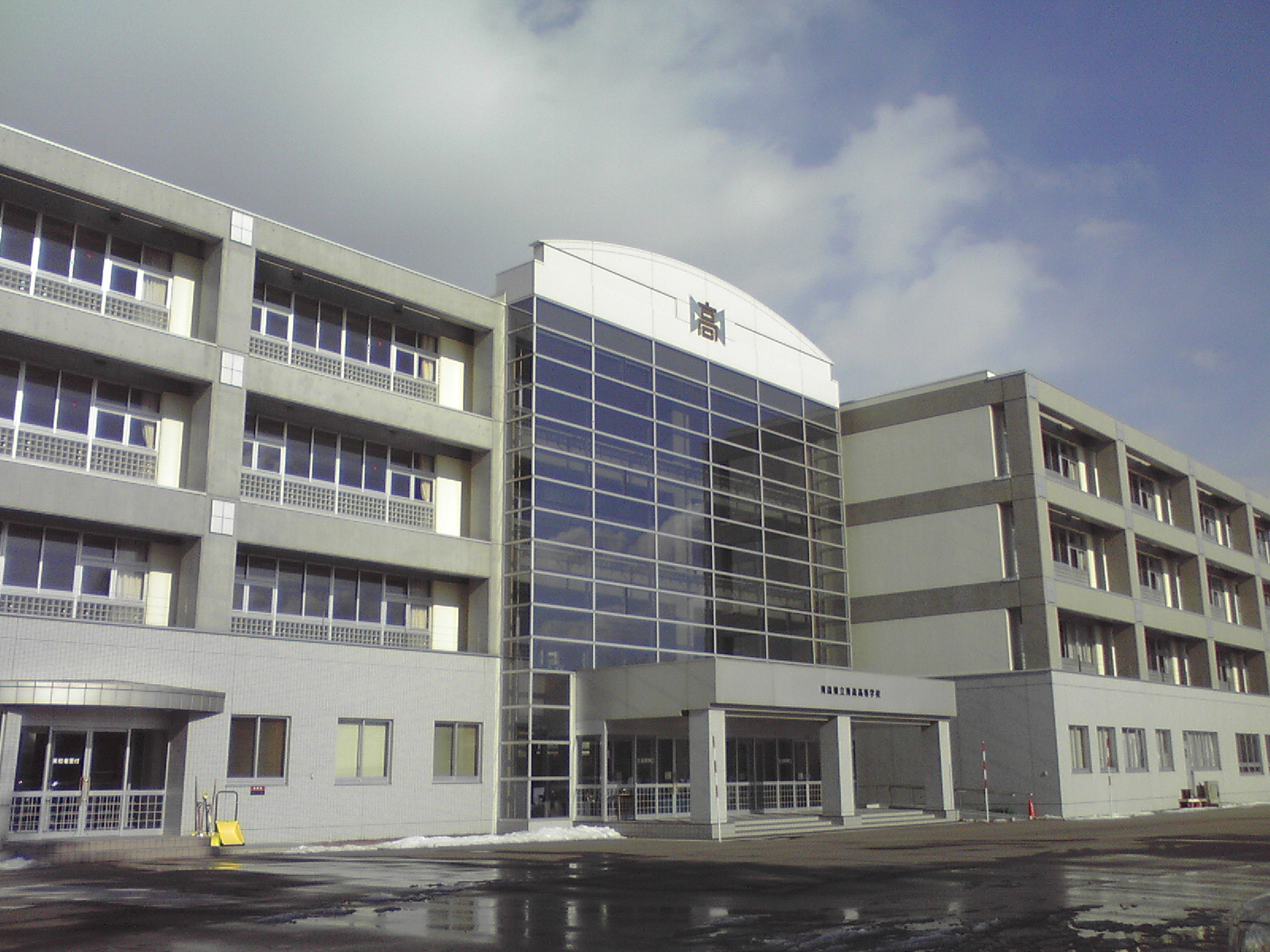
- New school building completed in 2006

Location
- 8-1-2 Sakuragawa; Aomori, Aomori 030-0945; Japan; 40°48′32.1″N 140°46′1.9″E

Information
- Type: Public
- Motto: Self discipline, sincerity and diligence, responsibility for harmony (自律自啓・誠実勤勉・和協責任)
- Established: September 11, 1900
- Principal: Shinji Shishikura
- Grades: 1–3
- Gender: Coeducational
- Website: www.aomori-h.asn.ed.jp

Aomori High School (青森県立青森高等学校, Aomori Kenritsu Aomori Kōtō Gakkō) is a high school in the city of Aomori, Aomori Prefecture, Japan.

Originally a junior high school named Aomori Prefectural Third Junior High School (青森県立第三中学校, Aomori Kenritsu Daisan Chūgakkō), the school was established on September 11, 1900.

Aomori Prefectural First Junior High School in Hirosaki and Aomori Prefectural Second Junior High School in Hachinohe were later renamed Aomori Prefectural Hirosaki High School and Aomori Prefectural Hachinohe High School respectively. Aomori Prefectural Third Junior High School in the city of Aomori was also renamed Aomori Prefectural Aomori High School.

The school later moved to the site of the former military camp where the 2nd Battalion, 5th Infantry Regiment involved in the Hakkōda Mountains incident was based. In the 1902 accident, 199 out of 210 soldiers on winter training exercises perished.

In March 2004, one of the school's chairmen was dismissed for having embezzled 34 million yen from the school's 100th anniversary funds.

== Notable alumni ==
- Toru Abo, immunologist^{[c]}
- Noriko Awaya, singer^{[b]}
- Osamu Dazai, writer
- Chiharu Igaya, former alpine ski racer
- Mika Iida, retired professional wrestler^{[c]}
- Tomohiro Katō, spree killer
- Yao Kitabatake, poet and children's literature writer^{[b]}
- Michio Mamiya, composer
- Keizo Miura, skier and mountain photographer
- Yūichirō Miura, skier and alpinist^{[c]}
- Teruo Murakami, former table tennis player^{[c]}
- Kodai Naraoka, badminton player
- Tohl Narita, visual artist^{[a]}
- Kinya Oyanagi, retired professional wrestler^{[c]}
- Kyōichi Sawada, photographer^{[c]}
- Goro Shibutani, former table tennis player^{[c]}
- Akimitsu Takagi, writer
- Masaki Tamura, cinematographer^{[c]}
- Toshibumi Tanaka, politician and first Governor of Hokkaido
- Shūji Terayama, writer^{[c]}

=== Notes ===
- ^a denotes an alum of Aomori High School (pre-integration)
- ^b denotes an alum of Aomori Girls' High School
- ^c denotes an alum of Aomori High School (integrated)
