= Momoishi, Aomori =

Momoishi 百石町
- Former municipality
- Flag Emblem

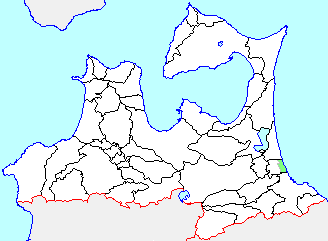
- Location of Momoishi in Aomori Prefecture

- Location in Japan
- Coordinates: 40°35′41.80″N 141°25′42.3″E
- Country: Japan
- Region: Tōhoku
- Prefecture: Aomori Prefecture
- District: Kamikita
- Merged: March 1, 2006 (now part of Oirase)

Area
  - Total: 21.44 km^{2} (8.28 sq mi)

Population (February 1, 2006)
  - Total: 9,970
  - Density: 465/km^{2} (1,200/sq mi)
- Time zone: UTC+09:00 (JST)
- Symbols
- Bird: common gull
- Flower: plum
- Tree: Ginkgo

Momoishi (百石町, Momoishi-machi) was a town located in Kamikita District in central Aomori Prefecture, Japan.

On March 1, 2006, Momoishi, along with the neighboring town of Shimoda (also from Kamikita District), was merged to create the town of Oirase, and thus it no longer exists as an independent municipality.

Momoishi Village was founded on April 1, 1889. On April 20, 1929, it was elevated to town status.

Bordering the Pacific Ocean, the town had an agriculture-based economy based on commercial fishing and the production of rice, strawberries, and Japanese yams. The major local industry was Momokawa Brewing, Inc, a nationally known sake brewer.

At the time of its merger, Momoishi had an estimated population of 9,970 and a population density of 465 persons per km^{2}. The total area was 21.44 km^{2}.

Momoishi was served by Japan National Route 45 and Route 338 highways, but had no train service.
