= Shimoda Station =

Railway station in Oirase, Aomori Prefecture, Japan

Shimoda Station 下田駅
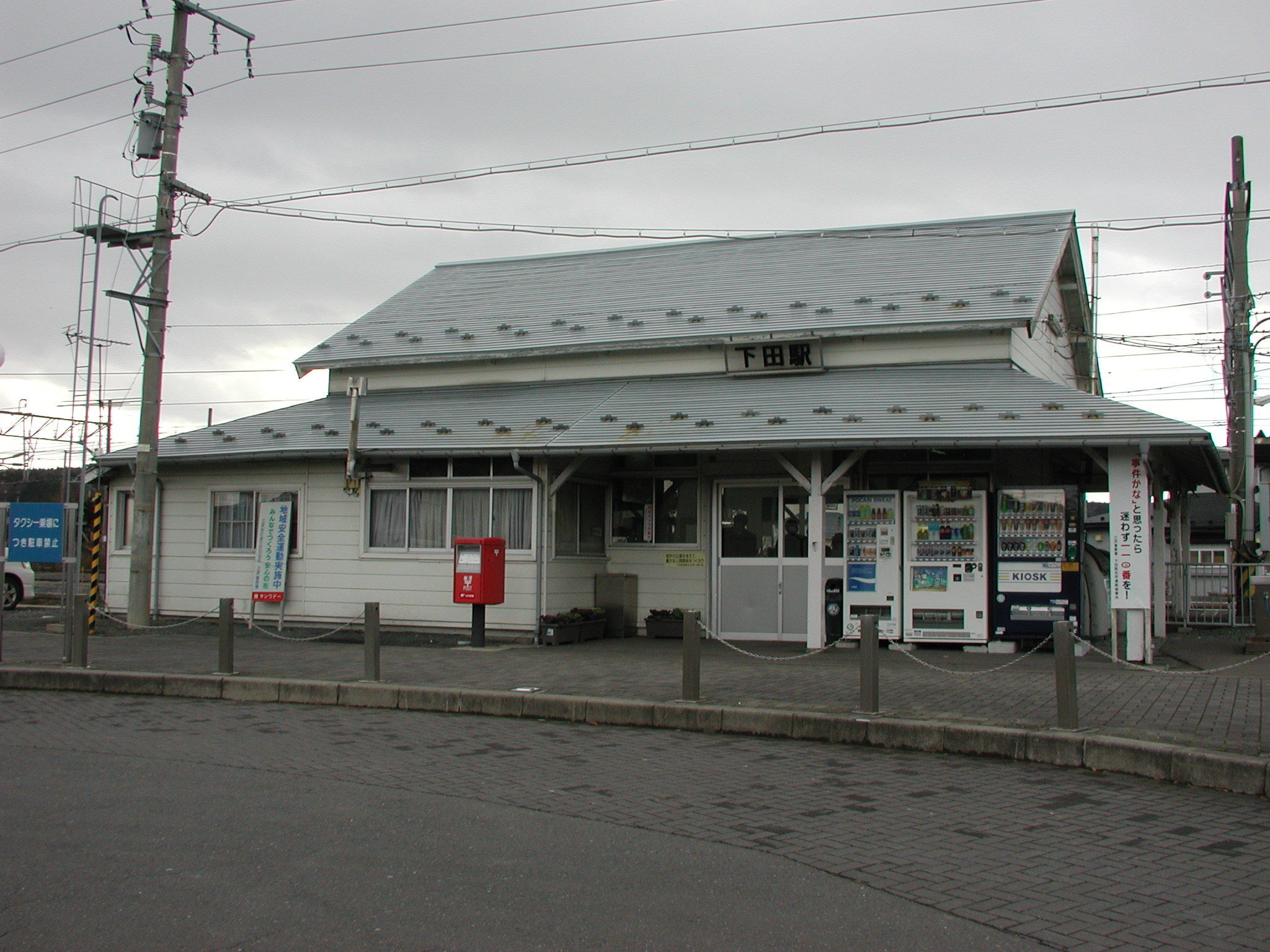
- Shimoda Station in December 2007

General information
- Location: Sakaida, Oirase-machi, Kamikita-gun, Aomori-ken 039-2124; Japan
- Coordinates: 40°35′30.99″N 141°24′27.79″E
- System: Regional rail station
- Operator: Aoimori Railway
- Line: ■ Aoimori Railway Line
- Distance: 84.9 km from Aomori
- Platforms: 1 island + 1 side platform
- Tracks: 3
- Connections: Bus stop

Construction
- Structure type: At grade

Other information
- Status: Staffed
- Website: Official website

History
- Opened: December 20, 1891

Services
Preceding station	Aoimori Railway	Following station
Hachinohe Terminus	Shimokita	Misawa towards Noheji
Mutsu-Ichikawa towards Metoki	Aoimori Railway Line	Mukaiyama towards Aomori
Location
- Location within Aomori Prefecture Location within Japan

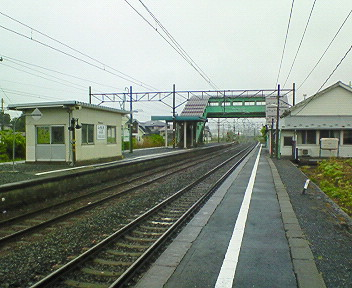
Shimoda Station platforms

Shimoda Station (下田駅, Shimoda eki) is a railway station on the Aoimori Railway Line in the town of Oirase in Aomori Prefecture, Japan, operated by the third sector railway operator Aoimori Railway Company.

== Lines ==
Shimoda Station is served by the Aoimori Railway Line, and is 37.0 kilometers from the terminus of the line at Metoki Station. It is 654.3 kilometers from Tokyo Station.

== Station layout ==
Shimoda Station has a one ground-level island platform and one ground-level side platform serving three tracks connected to the station building by a footbridge. However, only tracks 1 and 3 are in use, and track 2 is used as a siding. The station is staffed.

=== Platforms ===
1	■ Aoimori Railway Line	for Sannohe and Hachinohe
2	■ Aoimori Railway Line	(siding)
3	■ Aoimori Railway Line	for Misawa, Noheji and Aomori

== Bus services ==
- Towada Kanko Bus
  - For Towada via Rokunohe
  - For Hachinohe via Tagadai-Danchi

== History ==
Shimoda Station was opened on December 20, 1891, as a station on the Nippon Railway. It became a station on the Tōhoku Main Line of the Japanese Government Railways (JGR), the pre-war predecessor to the Japan National Railway (JNR) after the nationalization of the Nippon Railway on November 1, 1906. Regularly scheduled freight services were discontinued in October 1971, and it has been managed from Misawa Station since February 1983. With the privatization of the JNR on April 1, 1987, it came under the operational control of JR East.

The section of the Tōhoku Main Line including this station was transferred to Aoimori Railway on December 4, 2010.

== Surrounding area ==
- Oirase River
- Former Shimoda Town Hall

== See also ==
- List of railway stations in Japan
