= Kamikita District, Aomori =

District in Aomori prefecture, Japan

Coordinates: 40°46′26″N 141°15′39″E

Location of Kamikita District in Aomori Prefecture.

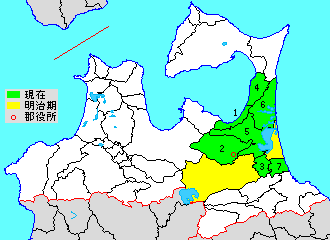
Location of Kamikita-gun, Aomori Prefecture, highlighted in green; with former areas in yellow.

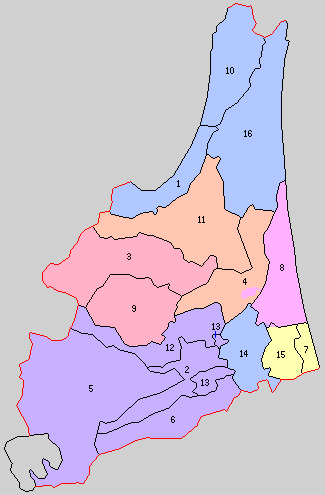
Colored areas are in the district.

Kamikita District (上北郡, Kamikita-gun) is a district located in Aomori Prefecture, Japan. It occupies the east-central portion of the prefecture, south of Shimokita Peninsula.

As of 2010, the district has an estimated population of 100,526 and a density of 78.5 persons per km^{2}. The total area was 1281.05 km^{2}.

== Politics ==
In terms of national politics, the district is represented in the Diet of Japan's House of Representatives as a part of the Aomori 1st district and the Aomori 2nd district.

== Towns and villages ==
The district consists of six towns and one village. The cities of Towada and Misawa were formerly part of the district.

- Noheji
- Oirase
- Rokkasho
- Rokunohe
- Shichinohe
- Tōhoku
- Yokohama

== History ==
Kamikita District was part of ancient Kita County (北郡, Kita-gun), established by the Northern Fujiwara. During the Edo period, the area was part of the Morioka han feudal domain of the Nanbu clan, with daikansho located in Noheji and Shichinohe.

The Nanbu clan sided with the Ōuetsu Reppan Dōmei during the Boshin War of the Meiji Restoration and were punished by the new Meiji government by loss of their northern territories. In November 1869, Kita-gun and neighboring Sannohe District became part of the newly created Tonami Domain (斗南藩, Tonami-han), a 30,000 koku holding created to resettle the dispossessed Matsudaira clan from Aizu-Wakamatsu. In July 1871, with the abolition of the han system, Tonami Domain became Tonami Prefecture, and was merged into the newly created Aomori Prefecture in September 1871.

During the early Meiji period administrative reorganization of Japan on July 22, 1878, Kamikita and Shimokita were divided from former Kita County, and Kamikita was divided into 50 villages. In the cadastral reform of April 1, 1889, the number of villages was reduced through consolidations and mergers to sixteen.

=== District Timeline ===
- On September 27, 1897, the village of Noheji was elevated to town status.
- On September 1, 1902, the village of Shichinohe was elevated to town status.
- On September 1, 1910, the village of Sanbongi was elevated to town status.
- On April 20, 1929, the village of Momoishi was elevated to town status.
- On February 1, 1948, several villages or portions of villages were merged to create the town of Omisawa.
- On February 1, 1956, the town of Sanbongi was elevated to city status.
- On April 1, 1956, the village of Towada was elevated to town status.
- On October 1, 1957, the village of Rokunohe was elevated to town status.
- On April 1, 1958, the village of Yokohama was elevated to town status.
- On September 1, 1958, the town of Omisawa was elevated to city status and became the city of Misawa.
- On September 1, 1958, the village of Uranodate was elevated to town status and became the town of Kamikita.
- On August 1, 1969, the village of Shimoda was elevated to town status.
- On April 1, 1975, the town of Towada was renamed as the town of Towadako.

=== District Background ===
pre-1889	April 1, 1889	1889–1949	1950–1989		1989–present	present	
	Yokohama-mura	Yokohama-mura	Yokohama-mura	April 1, 1958; Yokohama-machi	Yokohama-machi	Yokohama-machi	Yokohama
	Noheji-mura	September 27, 1897; Noheji-machi	Noheji-machi	Noheji-machi	Noheji-machi	Noheji-machi	Noheji
	Uranodate-mura	Uranodate-mura	Uranodate-mura	September 1, 1958 renamed as Kamikita-machi	Kamikita-machi	March 31, 2005; Tōhoku-machi	Tōhoku
	Kachiji-mura	Kachiji-mura	Kachiji-mura	November 1, 1963 renamed as Tōhoku-machi	Tōhoku-machi	March 31, 2005; Tōhoku-machi	Tōhoku
	Shichinohe-mura	September 1, 1902; Shichinohe-machi	Shichinohe-machi	Shichinohe-machi	Shichinohe-machi	March 31, 2005; Shichinohe-machi	Shichinohe
	Tenmabayashi-mura	Tenmabayashi-mura	Tenmabayashi-mura	Tenmabayashi-mura	Tenmabayashi-mura	March 31, 2005; Shichinohe-machi	Shichinohe
	Sanbongi-mura	September 1, 1910; Sanbongi-machi	Sanbongi-machi	February 1, 1955; Sanbongi-shi; October 10, 1956 renamed as Towada-shi	Towada-shi	January 1, 2005; Towada-shi	Towada
	Ofukanai-mura	Ofukanai-mura	Ofukanai-mura	February 1, 1955; Sanbongi-shi; October 10, 1956 renamed as Towada-shi	Towada-shi	January 1, 2005; Towada-shi	Towada
	Fujisaka-mura	Fujisaka-mura	Fujisaka-mura	February 1, 1955; Sanbongi-shi; October 10, 1956 renamed as Towada-shi	Towada-shi	January 1, 2005; Towada-shi	Towada
	Yotsuwa-mura	Yotsuwa-mura	Yotsuwa-mura	March 1, 1956 merged into Misawa-shi	Towada-shi	January 1, 2005; Towada-shi	Towada
	Hookusawa-mura	September 7, 1931 merged into Towada-mura	Towada-mura	April 1, 1956; Towada-machi	April 1, 1976 renamed as Towadako-machi	January 1, 2005; Towada-shi	Towada
	Rokkasho-mura	Rokkasho-mura	Rokkasho-mura	Rokkasho-mura	Rokkasho-mura	Rokkasho-mura	Rokkasho
	Misawa-mura	Misawa-mura	February 1, 1948; Omisawa-machi (part of Rokunohe, Shimoda; Uranodate merged)	September 1, 1958 renamed as Misawa-shi	Misawa-shi	Misawa-shi	Misawa
	Momoishi-mura	April 20, 1929; Momoishi-machi	Momoishi-machi	Momoishi-machi	Momoishi-machi	March 1, 2005; Oirase-machi	Oirase
	Shimoda-mura	Shimoda-mura	Shimoda-mura	Shimoda-mura	August 1, 1969; Shimoda-machi	March 1, 2005; Oirase-machi	Oirase
	Rokunohe-mura	Rokunohe-mura	Rokunohe-mura	October 1, 1957; Rokunohe-machi	Rokunohe-machi	Rokunohe-machi	Rokunohe

=== Recent mergers ===
- On January 1, 2005 - The town of Towadako was merged into the expanded city of Towada.
- On March 1, 2005 - The towns of Shimoda and Momoishi were merged to form the town of Oirase.
