= Toru Abo =

Japanese immunologist (1947–2016)

Toru Abo (1947 - December 6, 2016) was a Japanese immunologist and author from the Aomori Prefecture. His work involved creating monoclonal antibodies against natural killer cells.

== Education and career ==
He received his PhD from Tohoku University School of Medicine. He served as a professor of medicine at Niigata University. Abo was also a member of the Department of Medicine and Surgery at the University of Alabama at Birmingham.

== Selected publications ==
- The Only Two Causes of All Diseases
- Your Immune Revolution and Healing Your Healing Power
