= Shimoda (surname) =

Shimoda (written: 下田) is a Japanese surname. Notable people with the surname include:

- Akifumi Shimoda (下田 昭文, born 1984), Japanese boxer
- Asami Shimoda (下田 麻美, born 1986), Japanese singer and voice actress
- Atsuko Shimoda (下田 敦子, born 1940), Japanese politician
- Hayanari Shimoda (下田 隼成, born 1984), Japanese racing driver
- Kohei Shimoda (下田 光平, born 1989), Japanese footballer
- Mima Shimoda (下田 美馬, born 1970), Japanese professional wrestler
- Shimoda Toyomatsu (下田 豊松, 1887–1972), Japanese writer and Scouting pioneer
- Takashi Shimoda (下田 崇, born 1975), Japanese footballer
- Takeso Shimoda (下田 武三, died 1995), Japanese politician, diplomat, judge and baseball commissioner
- Utako Shimoda (下田 歌子, 1854–1936), Japanese educator and poet
- Yuki Shimoda (1921–1981), American actor

== Fictional characters ==
- Donald Shimoda, a character in the novel Illusions
- Jim Shimoda, a character in the Star Trek franchise
