= Wainai Sadayuki =

Wainai Sadayuki 和井内貞行
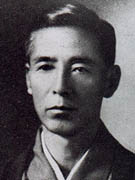
- Born: March 29, 1858; Kazuno, Akita
- Died: May 16, 1922 (aged 64); Kosaka, Akita
- Known for: development of Lake Towada

Wainai Sadayuki (和井内貞行; March 29, 1858 – May 16, 1922) was a pioneer known for his contributions to the development of Lake Towada in Akita Prefecture.

== Biography ==
Wainai was born in what is now Kazuno, Akita in 1858. He initially began his career in 1881 in the mining industry, then the backbone of Kazuno's economy, working at Kosaka Mines, which worked iron ore deposits at the shore of Lake Towada. At the time, Lake Towada was largely sterile, and the 2500 mine workers had to subsist on dried fish from town. Wainai worked as a guard on the water supply to the mines, and decided to ignore local folklore and superstition against stocking the lake with fish. Starting in 1884, Wainai attempted to introduce 600 salmon fry into Lake Towada. The effort failed, but persevering in the face of multiple setbacks and failures to the extent that he was forced to sell his personal belongings to continue the effort, Wainai finally succeeded in 1903 after a majority of trout fry he had released two years earlier survived. Wainai continued his efforts in following years, establishing a hatchery to attempt to introduce other varieties of fish as well. Today, thanks to Wainai's efforts, princess trout (姫鱒, Himemasu) and many other species flourish in Lake Towada, making it a very popular fishing spot.

Wainai also opened the Wainai Towadako Hotel in 1916 and is also known for promoting Lake Towada as one of the top tourist destinations in Tōhoku Region. He led legal efforts to preserve the lake and its surrounding natural environment, which eventually resulted in the proclamation of Towada National Park in 1936.

After his death in 1922, Wainai's spirit was enshrined in the Wainai Jinja, a Shinto shrine located in Kosaka, Akita near the lake in acknowledgment for his works.
