= Mukaiyama Station =

Railway station in Oirase, Aomori Prefecture, Japan

Mukaiyama Station 向山駅
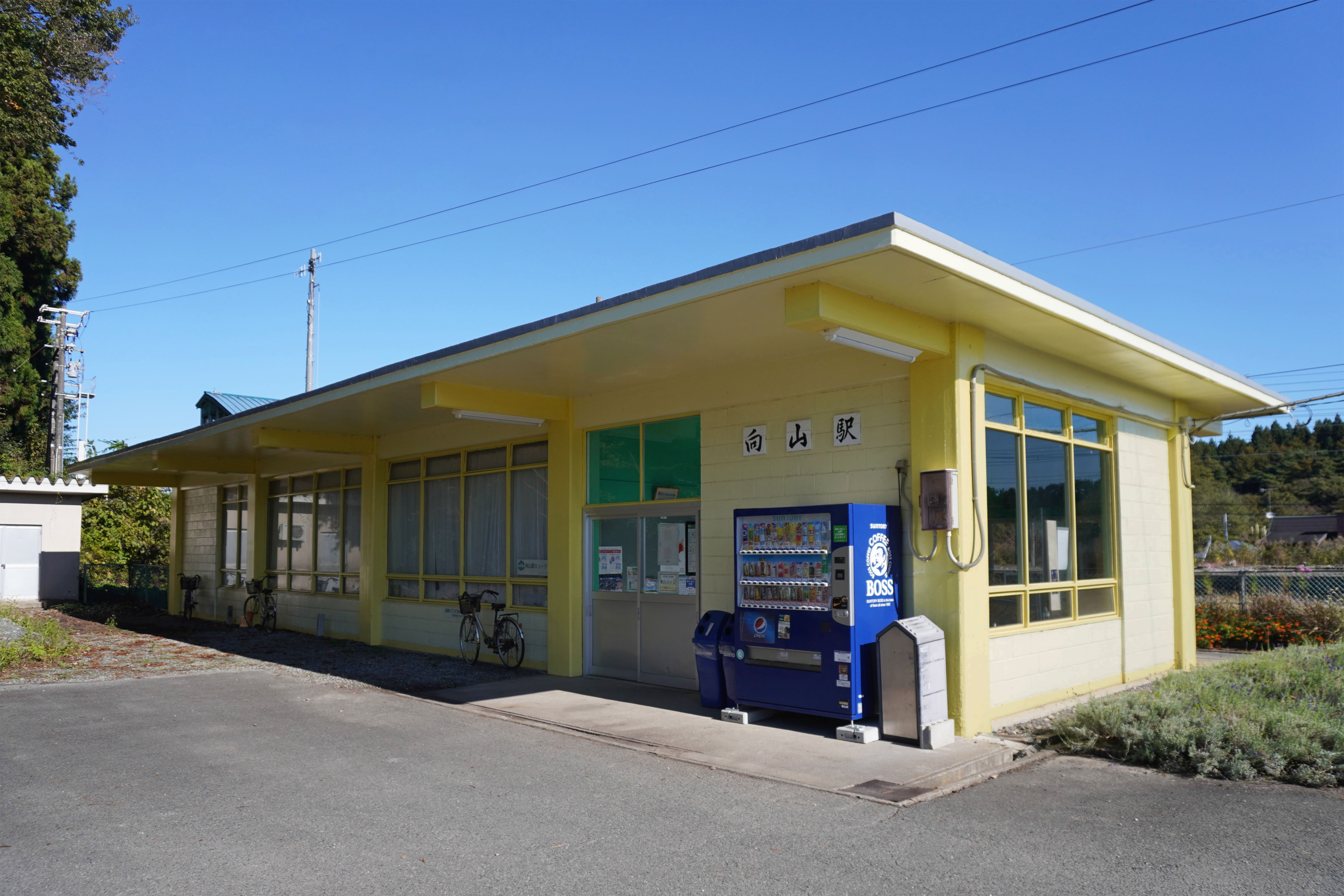
- Mukaiyama Station in October 2023

General information
- Location: 3 Mukaiyama, Oirase-machi, Kamikita-gun, Aomori-ken 039-2151; Japan
- Coordinates: 40°37′48.92″N 141°22′12.61″E
- System: Regional rail station
- Operator: Aoimori Railway
- Line: ■ Aoimori Railway Line
- Distance: 79.7 km from Aomori
- Platforms: 1 island platform
- Tracks: 2

Construction
- Structure type: At grade

Other information
- Status: Unstaffed
- Website: Official website

History
- Opened: July 10, 1936

Services
Preceding station	Aoimori Railway	Following station
Shimoda towards Metoki	Aoimori Railway Line	Misawa towards Aomori
Location
- Location within Aomori Prefecture Location within Japan

Mukaiyama Station (向山駅, Mukaiyama-eki) is a railway station on the Aoimori Railway Line in the town of Oirase in Aomori Prefecture, Japan, operated by the third sector railway operator Aoimori Railway Company.

== Lines ==
Mukaiyama Station is served by the Aoimori Railway Line, and is 79.7 kilometers from the terminus of the line at Aomori Station. It is 659.5 kilometers from Tokyo Station.

== Station layout ==
Mukaiyama Station has a single ground-level island platform serving two tracks connected to the station building by a footbridge. The station is unattended.

=== Platforms ===
1	■ Aoimori Railway Line	for Misawa, Noheji and Aomori
2	■ Aoimori Railway Line	for Hachinohe and Sannohe

== History ==
The station opened on July 10, 1936. With the privatization of JNR on April 1, 1987, it came under the operational control of East Japan Railway Company (JR East). With the opening of the Tohoku Shinkansen extension to Shin-Aomori, the section of the Tohoku Main Line including this station was transferred to the Aoimori Railway on December 4, 2010.

== Surrounding area ==
- Kawano Green Farm

== See also ==
- List of railway stations in Japan
