= Lake Towada =

Caldera lake in Aomori, Japan

Lake Towada 十和田湖
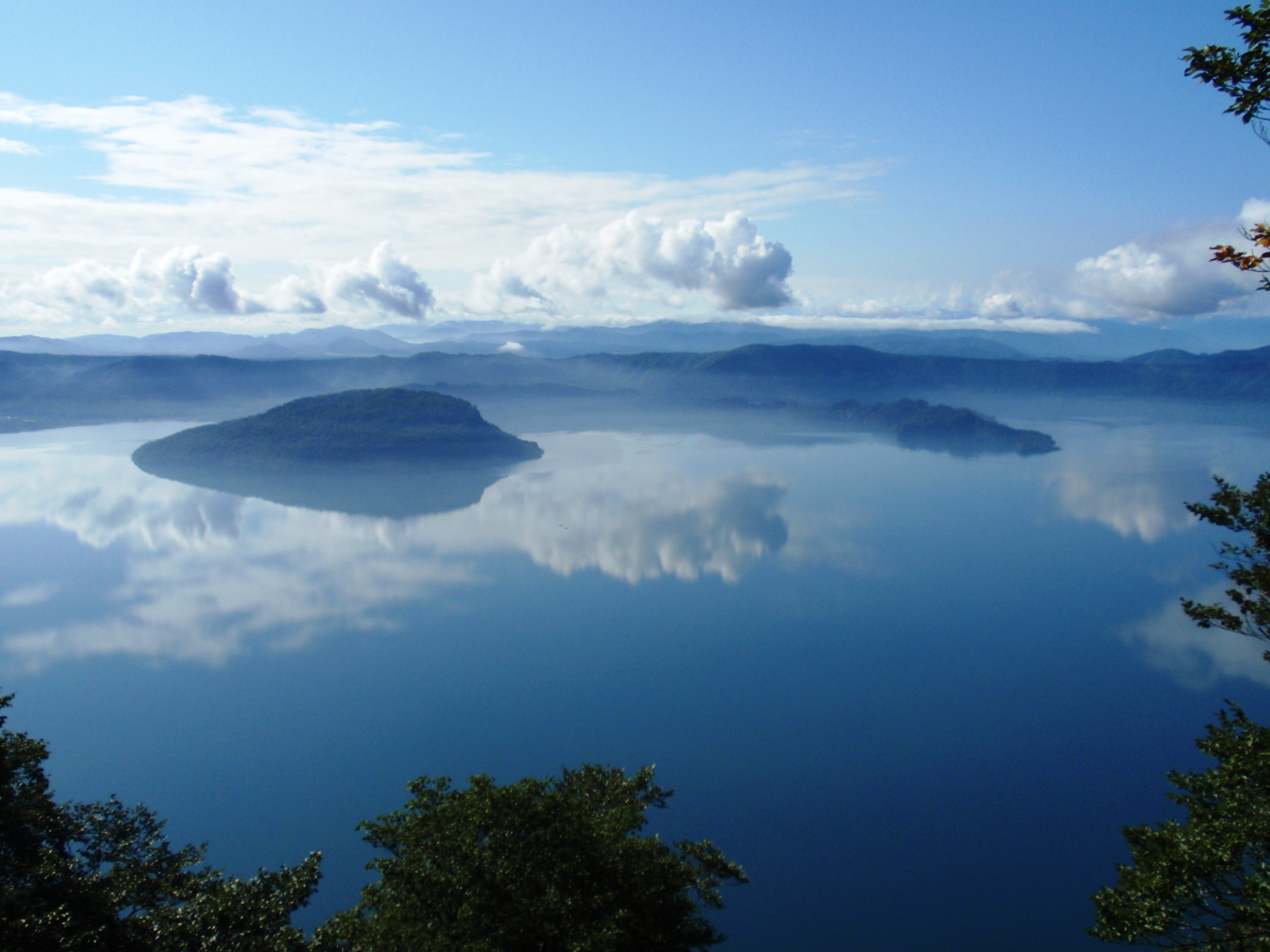

- Location within Japan Location within Aomori Prefecture
- Location: Honshū, Japan
- Coordinates: 40°28′N 140°52′E
- Type: Crater lake
- Primary outflows: Oirase River
- Basin countries: Japan
- Surface area: 61.1 km^{2} (23.6 sq mi)
- Average depth: 71 m (233 ft)
- Max. depth: 327 m (1,073 ft)
- Water volume: 4.19 km^{3} (3,400,000 acre⋅ft)
- Shore length^{1}: 46 km (29 mi)
- Surface elevation: 400 metres (1,312 ft)
- ^{1} Shore length is not a well-defined measure.

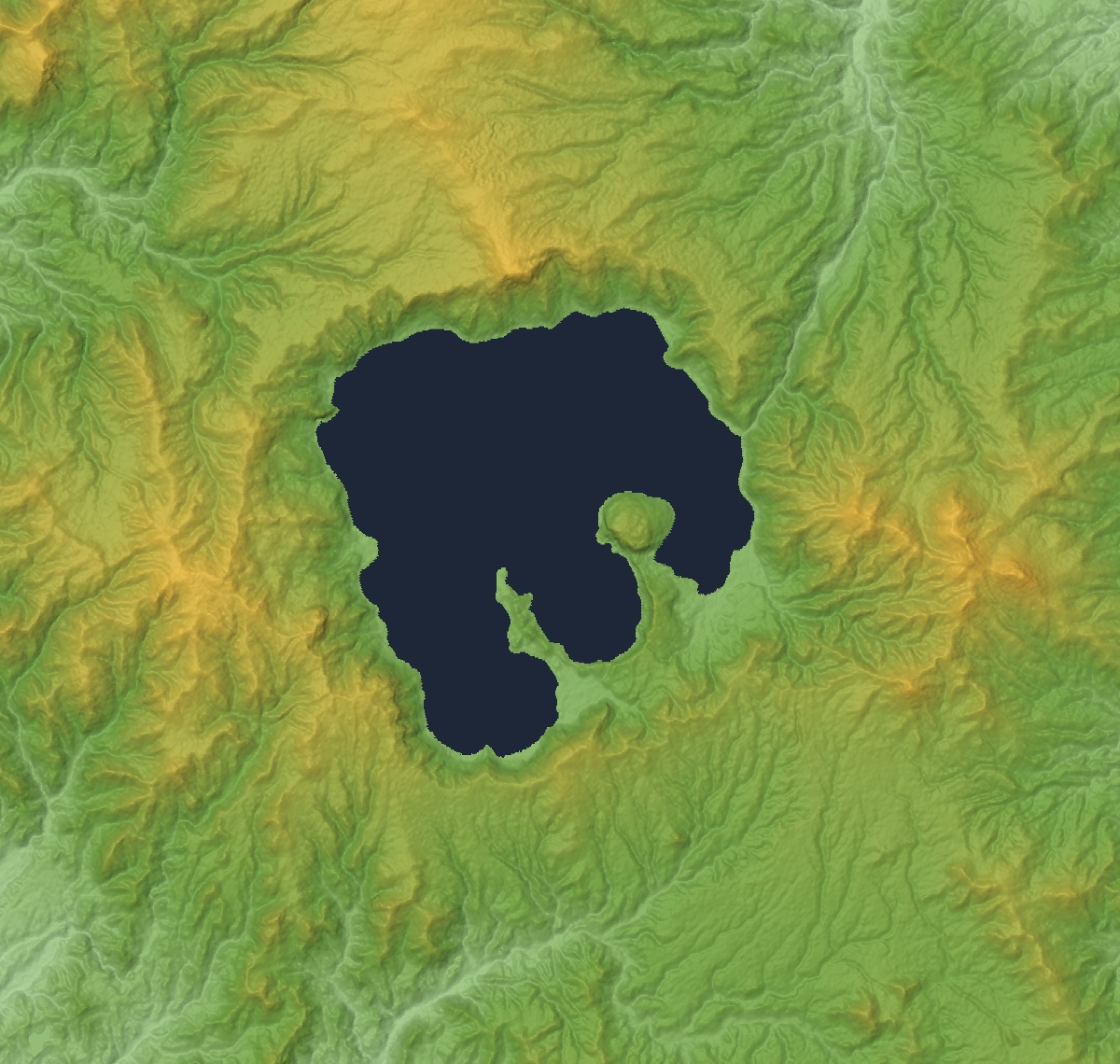
Towada Caldera

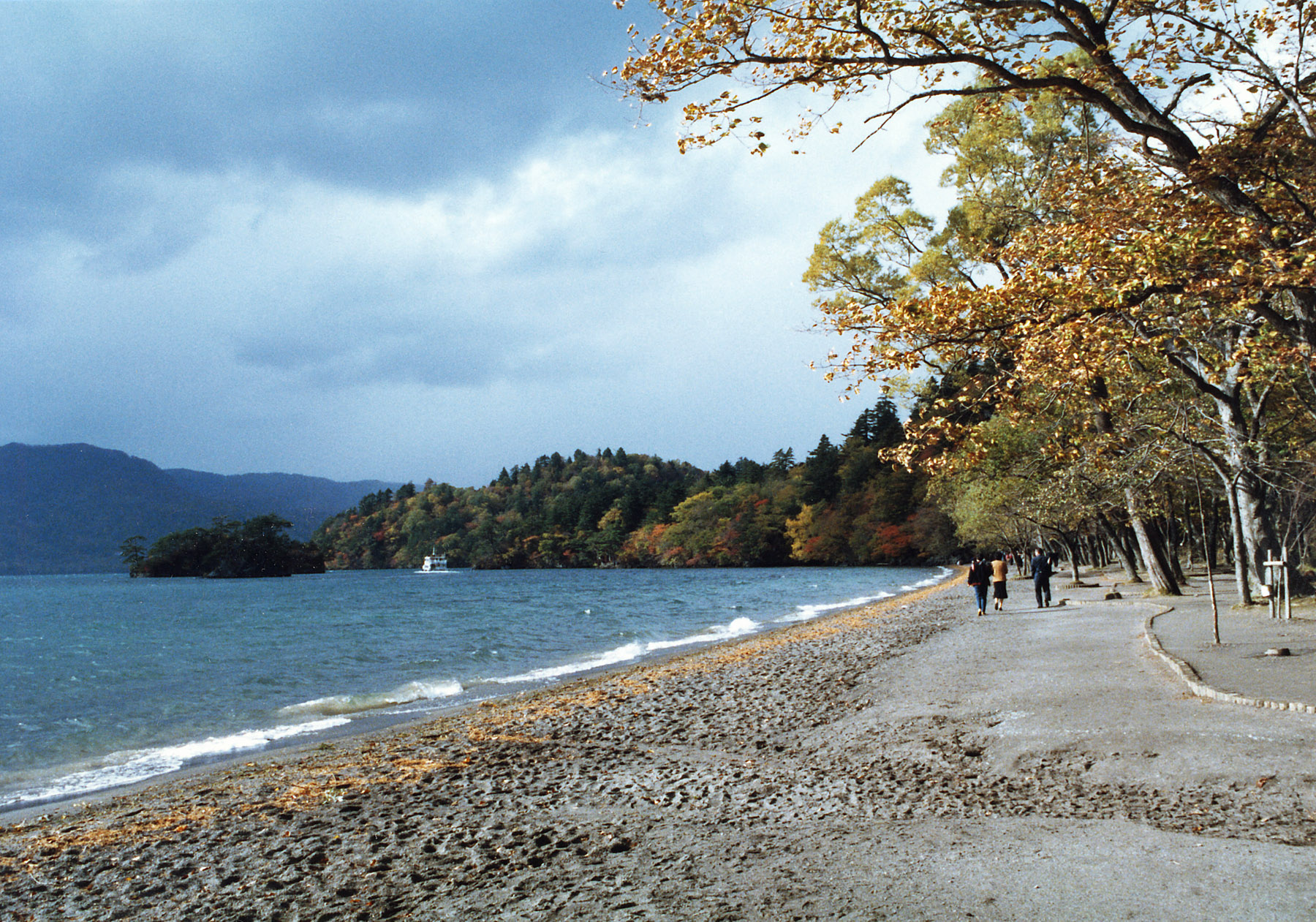
Lake Towada

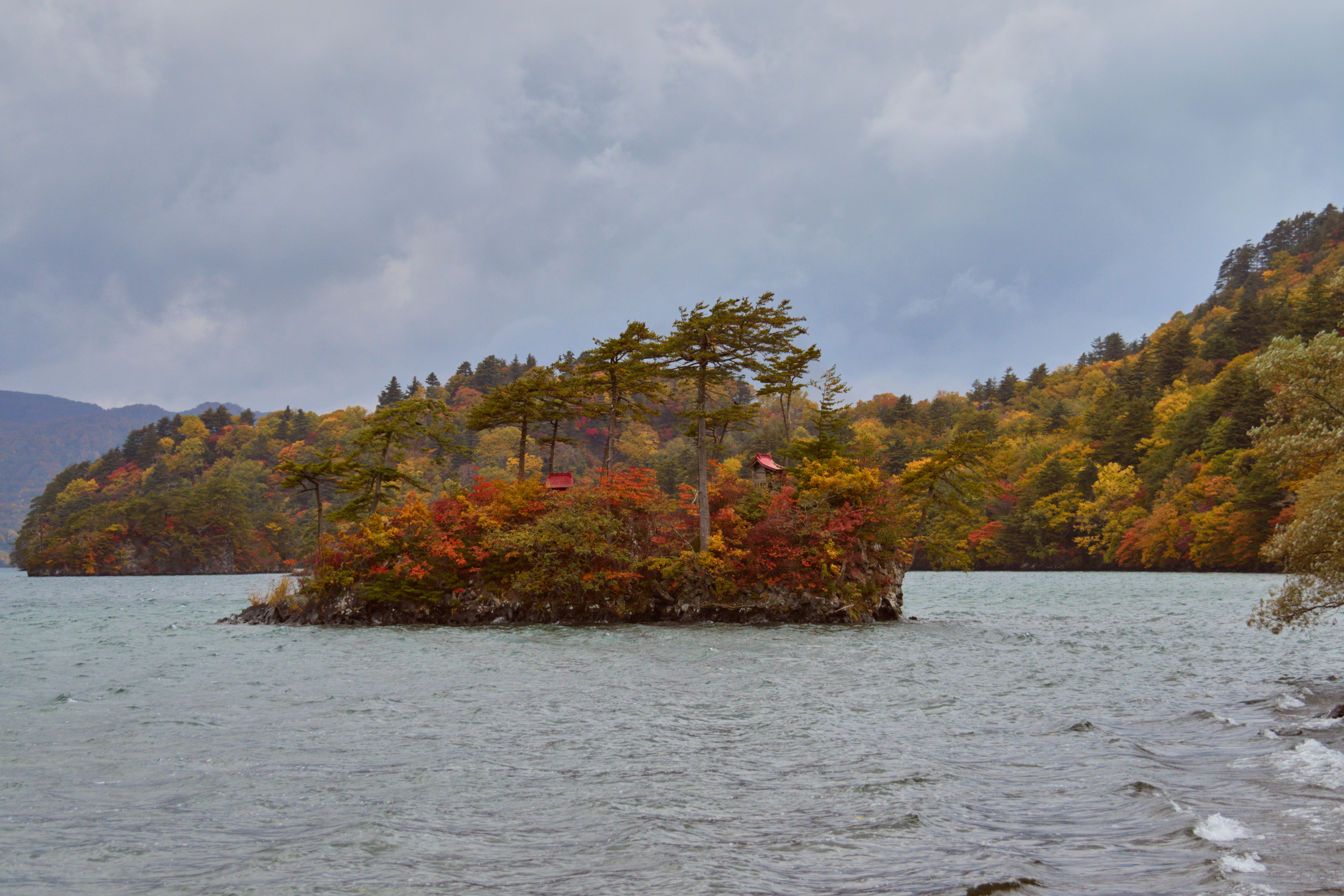
Lake Towada in autumn

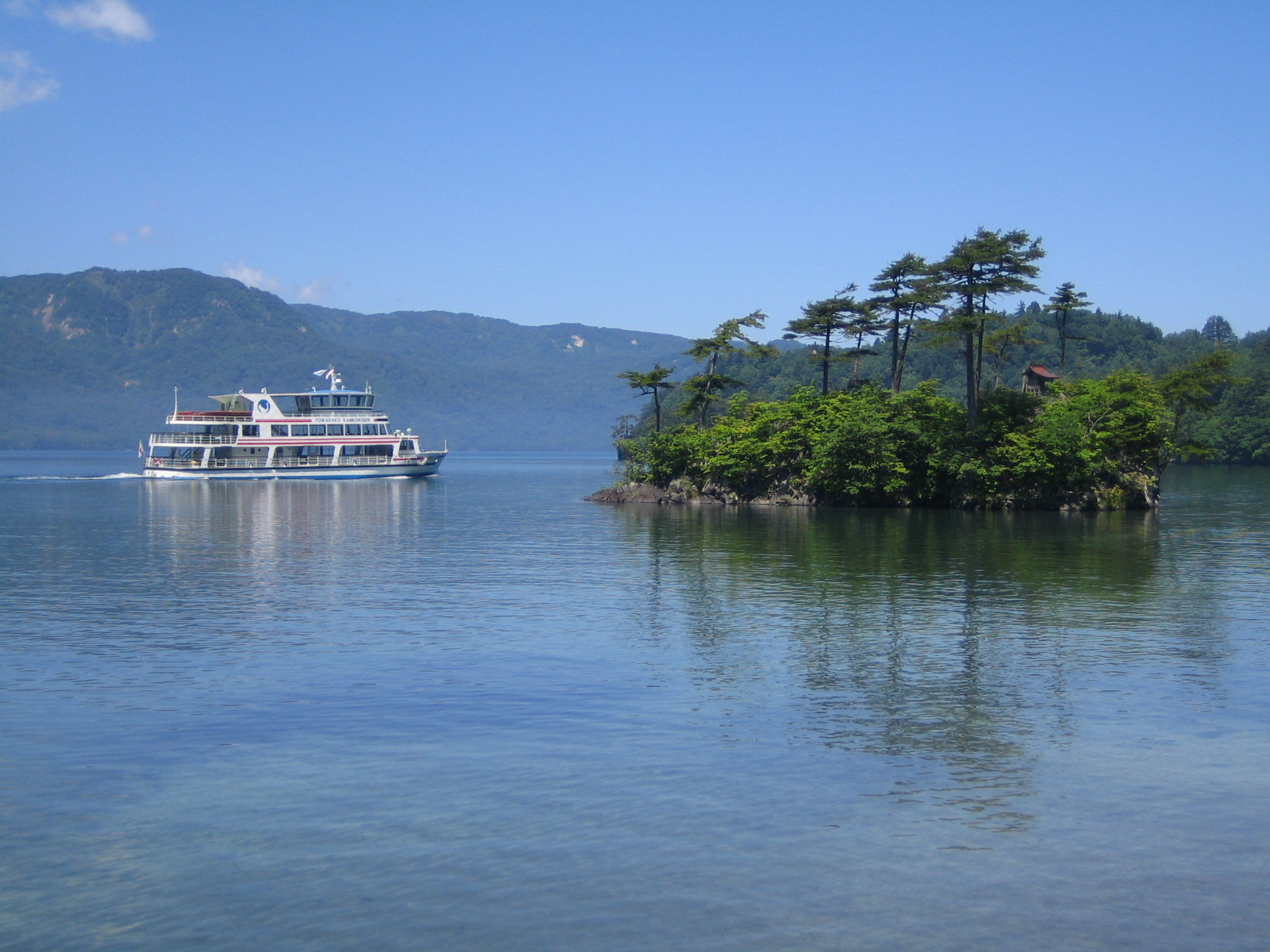
Sightseeing boat on Lake Towada

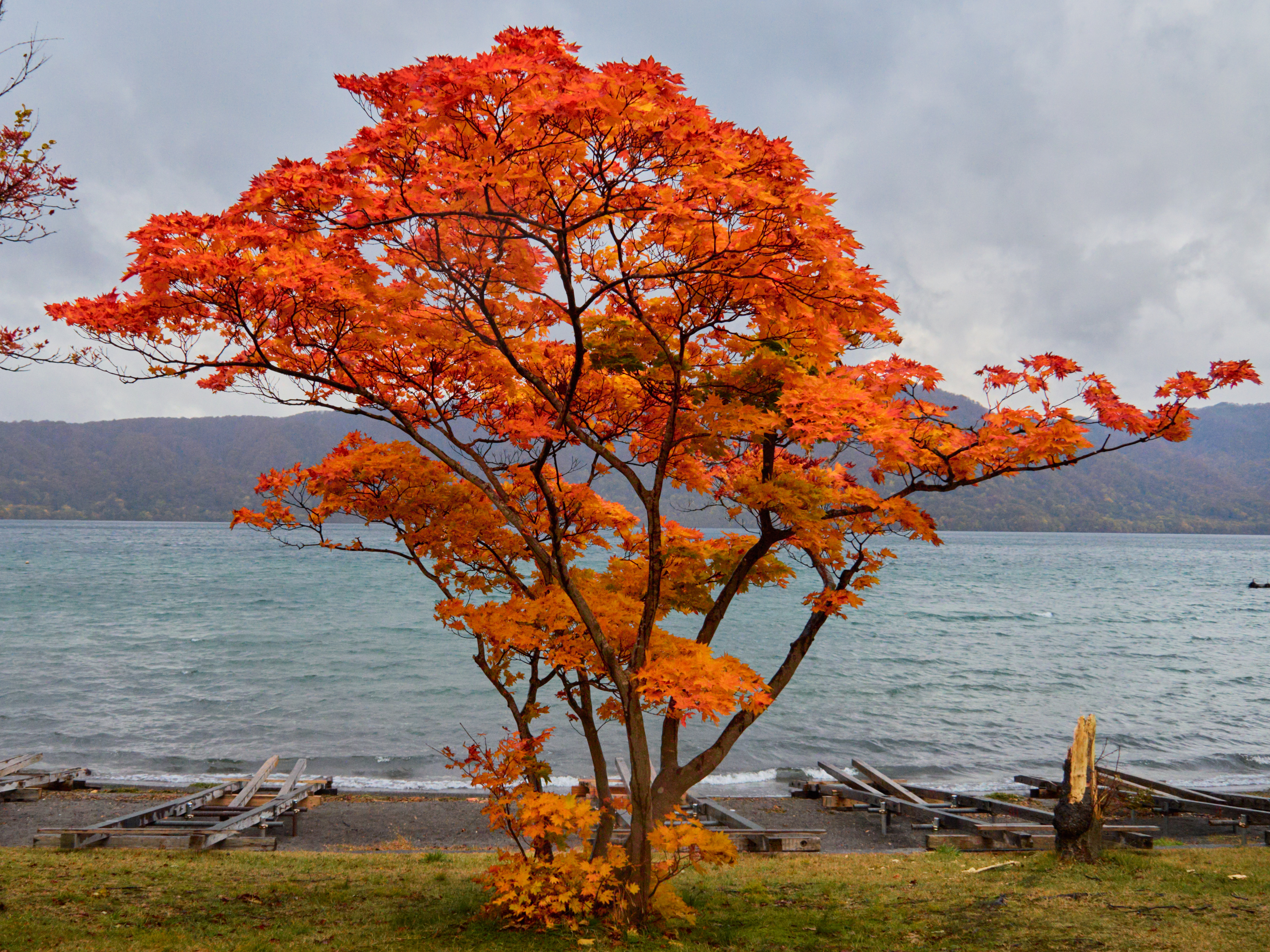
A Japanese maple tree in autumn on the shore of Lake Towada.

Lake Towada (十和田湖, Towada-ko) is the largest crater lake in Honshū island, Japan. Located on the border between Aomori and Akita prefectures, it lies 400 meters (1,312 ft) above sea level and is 327 m (1,073 ft) deep, drained by the Oirase River. With a surface area of 61.1 km^{2} (23.6 sq mi), Towada is Japan's 12th largest lake; its bright blue color is due to its great depth. The lake is roughly circular, with two peninsulas extending from its southern shore approximately one-third into the center of the lake. The lake is a popular tourist destination.

== Location ==
Lake Towada is located approximately 540 kilometers (340 mi) northeast of Tokyo, divided between the municipalities of Towada, Aomori and Kosaka, Akita. It forms part of the northern section of Towada-Hachimantai National Park

== Geology ==
Lake Towada occupies the caldera of a stratovolcano still regarded as active. This volcano became active around 200,000 years ago, and through repeated eruptions and pyroclastic flows, especially 55,000 and 36,000 and 15,000 years ago, created an 11-kilometer-diameter (6.8 mi) caldera with the proto-Lake-Towada. From approximately 15,000 to 12,000 years ago, intermittent eruptions formed a small stratovolcano within this caldera (Mount Goshikiiwa). Intermediate eruptive activity continued, and at least eight eruptions of magma occurred from 11,000 years ago to the present. The Ogurayama Lava Dome was formed approximately 7,600 years ago on the northeastern slope of the Goshikiiwa volcano. The Mikadoishi Lava Dome is estimated to have emerged between 12,000 and 2,800 years ago. The collapse of these secondary lava domes approximately 5400 years ago give the lake its distinct shape, and the inlet between its two peninsulas (called the "Nakaumi") is the remnant of a secondary caldera which erupted and collapsed.

== Hydrology ==
According to the National Institute for Environmental Studies of Japan, the water renewal cycle of Lake Towada is approximately 8.5 years. The catchment area of the lake covers an area of 129 square kilometers (50 mi^{2}). The lake area is fed by around seventy rivers, half of which are intermittent. The Oirase River, which drains towards the Pacific Ocean, is the only outlet.

== History ==
The name of the lake is believed to derive from the Ainu word to watara (ト ワタラ) , literally meaning "rocky lake".

According to a legendary account, the Yamata general Sakanoue Tamuramaro visited Lake Towada during one of his expeditions north to conquer the Emishi tribes and built a small Shinto shrine on the eastern shore of the Nakayama peninsula in 807 AD dedicated to Yamato Takeru. The mountain continued to erupt well into the historical period, with the last recorded eruption occurring in 915 AD in the Nakaumi caldera, devastating the surrounding area with pyroclastic flows and lahars and covering most of the Tōhoku region of Japan with volcanic ash, leading to crop failures, climate change, and famines.

During the Heian and Kamakura Period, the area was a wilderness and a place of prayer and training for Yamabushi, including worship of Suijin, the kami of water, as being associated with the azure dragon, legendary guardian of the lake, hence the other name of the sanctuary: Towadasan Seiryū daigongen.

The area around Lake Towada remained largely wilderness until towards the end of the Edo period, when the Nambu clan of Morioka Domain attempted large-scale land reclamation projects at Sanbongihara (modern Towada) using the Oirase River for irrigation. In 1903, largely through the efforts of Wainai Sadayuki, princess trout were introduced into Lake Towada. The lake now also has rainbow trout, cherry salmon, carp, Carassius, and Japanese eel. The surrounding forests are temperate-deciduous and are primarily Erman’s birch and Siebold’s beech.

The lake was selected by the Tokyo Nichi Nichi Shimbun and Osaka Mainichi Shimbun as one of the Eight Scenic Views of Japan in 1927. In 1936, the lake and surrounding areas became part of Towada-Hachimantai National Park.

In 1953, in order to popularize the lake and the park, a sculpture of two women titled "The Maiden Statue" by Kōtarō Takamura was dedicated at the lakeshore as part of the park's 15th anniversary celebration. It was the last work by that sculptor.

A wartime Tachikawa Ki-54 aircraft of the Imperial Japanese Army Air Force which crashed in 1943 was found at the bottom of Lake Towada on 13 August 2010. It was recovered on 5 September 2012 and was placed on display at the Misawa Aviation & Science Museum before being transferred in 2020 for a proposed restoration to Tachichi Holdings, the successor to the aircraft's manufacturer, the Tachikawa Aircraft Company.

== Activities ==
The lake's symbol, the Otome-no-Zo statue, is located in the central area of Yasumiya. From there excursion boats arrive and depart. In Utarube, visitors can canoe or camp.

== See also ==
- List of Special Places of Scenic Beauty, Special Historic Sites and Special Natural Monuments
- Tourism in Japan
