= Oirase River =

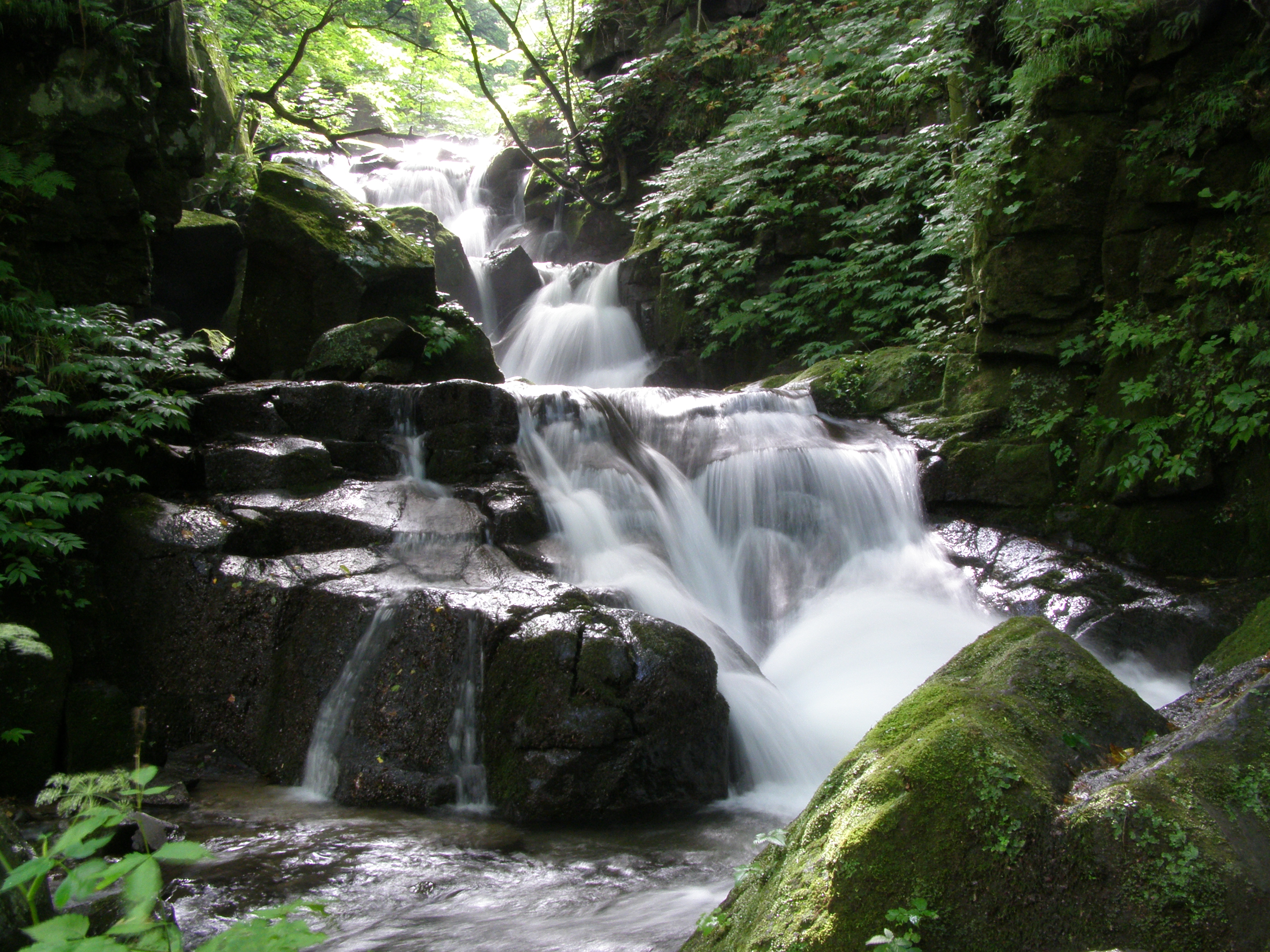
- Oirase River gorge

- Location within Japan
- Native name: 奥入瀬川 (Japanese)

Physical characteristics
- Source: Lake Towada
  - location: Aomori & Akita Prefectures, Japan
  - coordinates: 40°28′N 140°52′E
  - elevation: 401 m (1,316 ft)
- Mouth: Hachinohe
  - location: Pacific Ocean
  - coordinates: 40°36′28″N 141°27′40″E
  - elevation: 0 m (0 ft)
- Length: 67 km (42 mi)
- Basin size: 820 km^{2} (320 sq mi)

The Oirase River (奥入瀬川, Oirase-gawa) is a river located in eastern Aomori Prefecture, in the Tōhoku region of northern Japan.

The Oirase River is the only river that drains Lake Towada, a large caldera lake that lies on the border of Aomori and Akita Prefectures. The river flows in a generally eastern direction, through the municipalities of Towada, Rokunohe, Oirase, and Hachinohe before exiting into the Pacific Ocean. The upper reaches of the river form a scenic gorge with numerous rapids and waterfalls, and is one of the major tourist attractions of the Towada-Hachimantai National Park. The lower reaches of the river are used extensively for irrigation.

In 1996 the sound of flowing water at the Oirase River was selected by the Ministry of the Environment as one of the 100 Soundscapes of Japan.

== Gallery ==
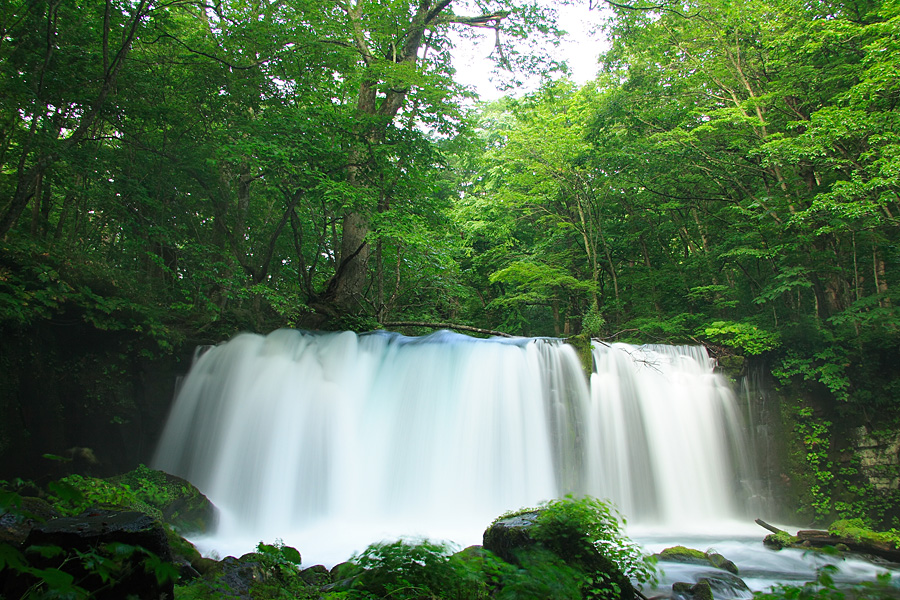
Chōshi Falls

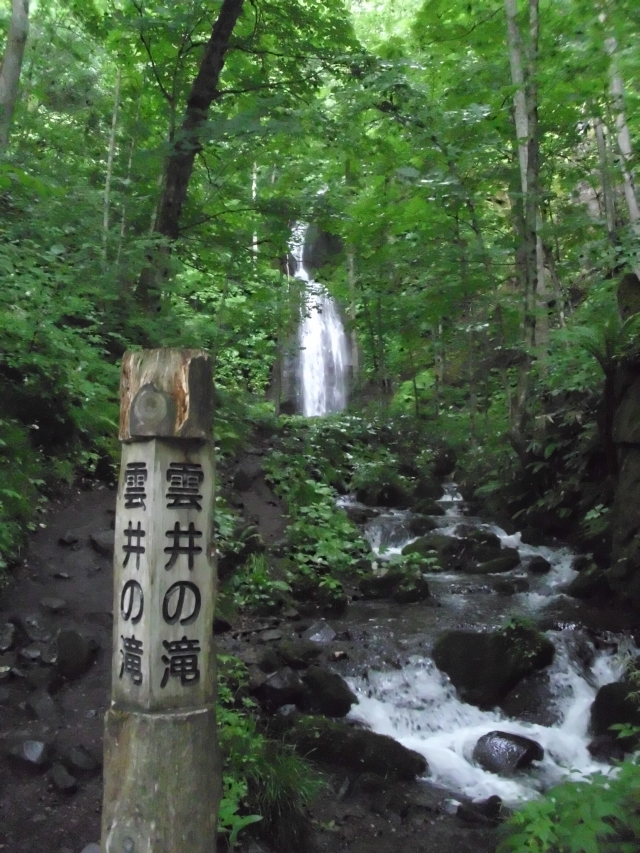
Kumoi Falls

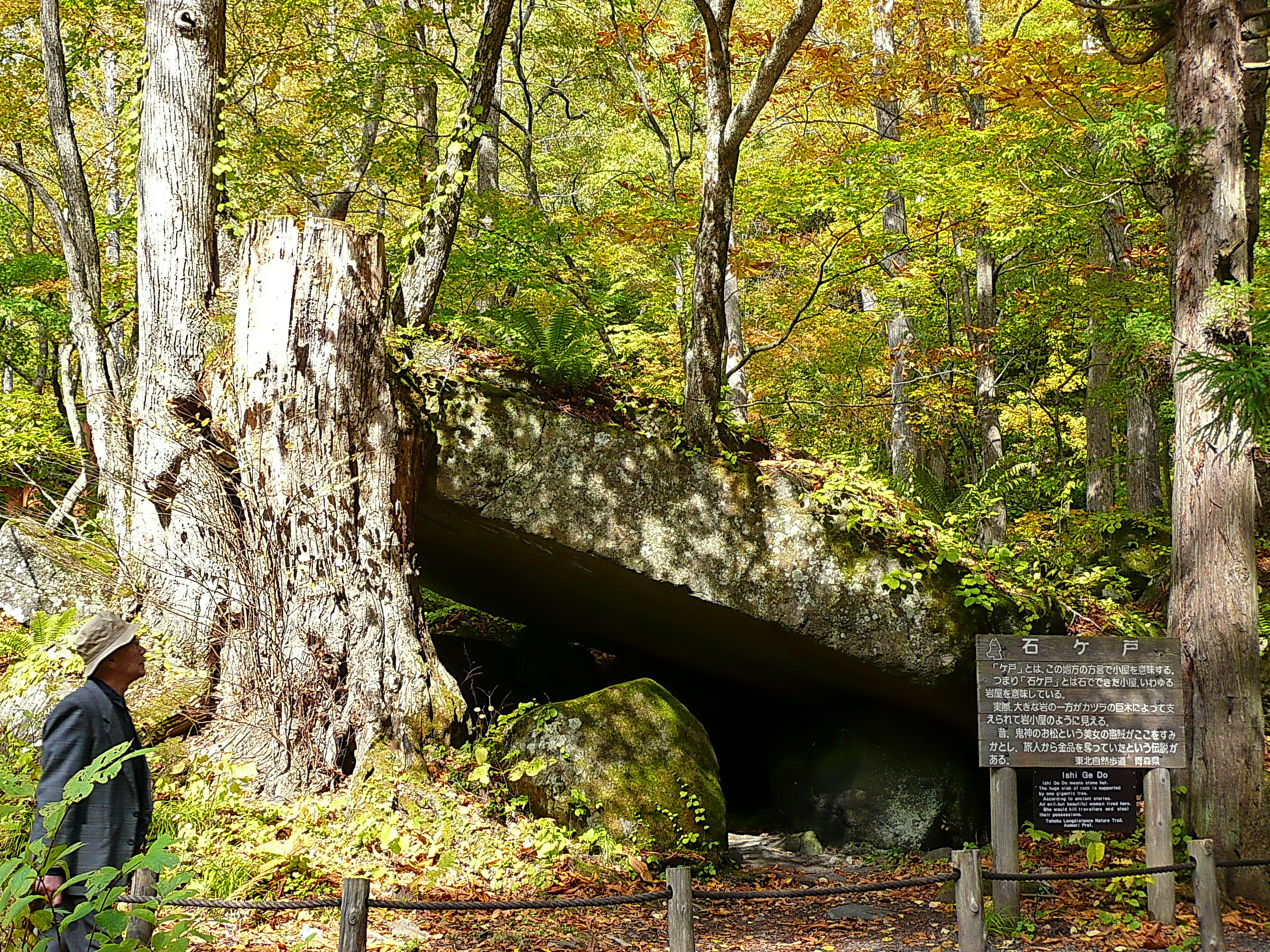
Rock cave at Oirase River

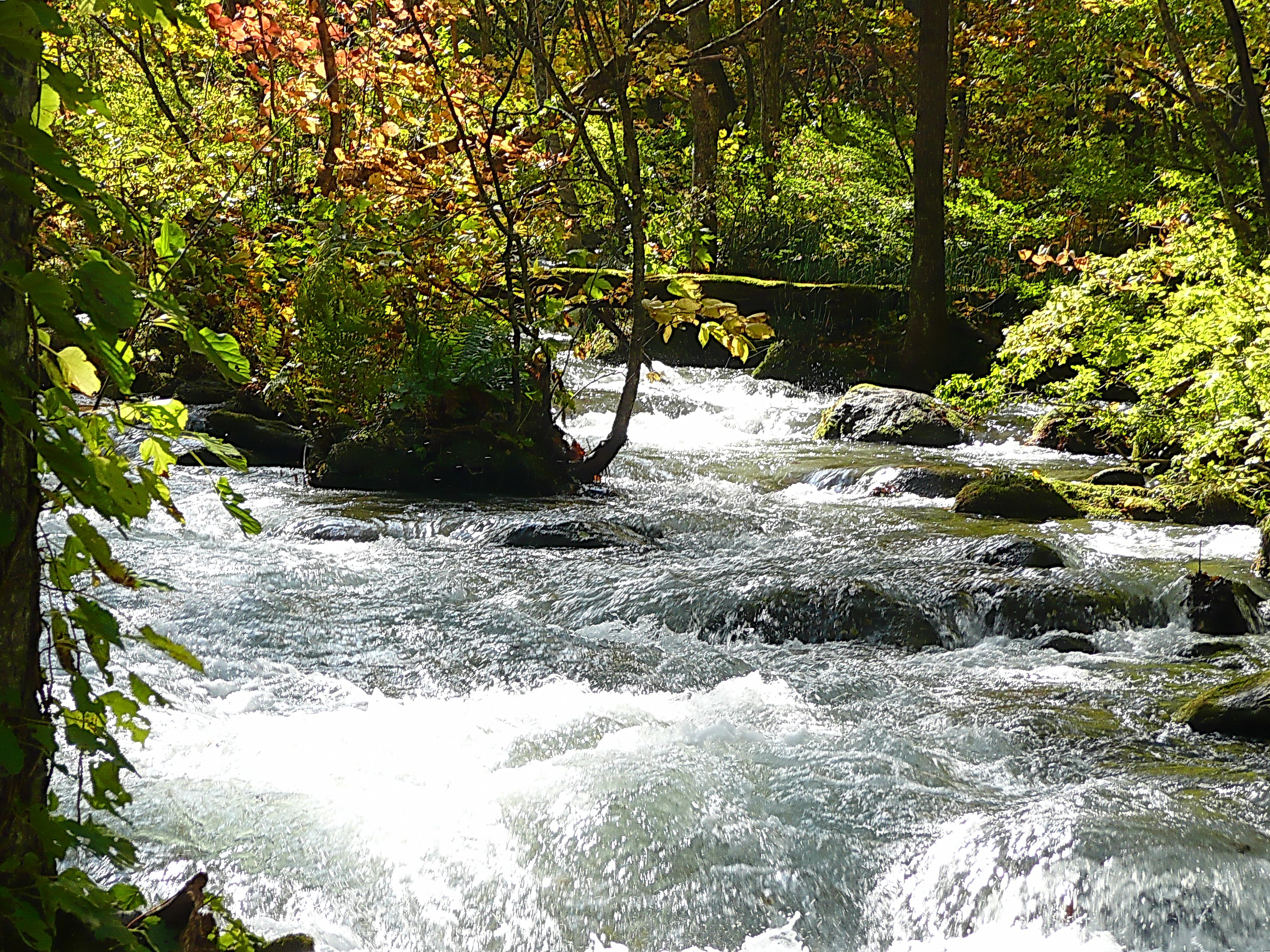
Oirase River

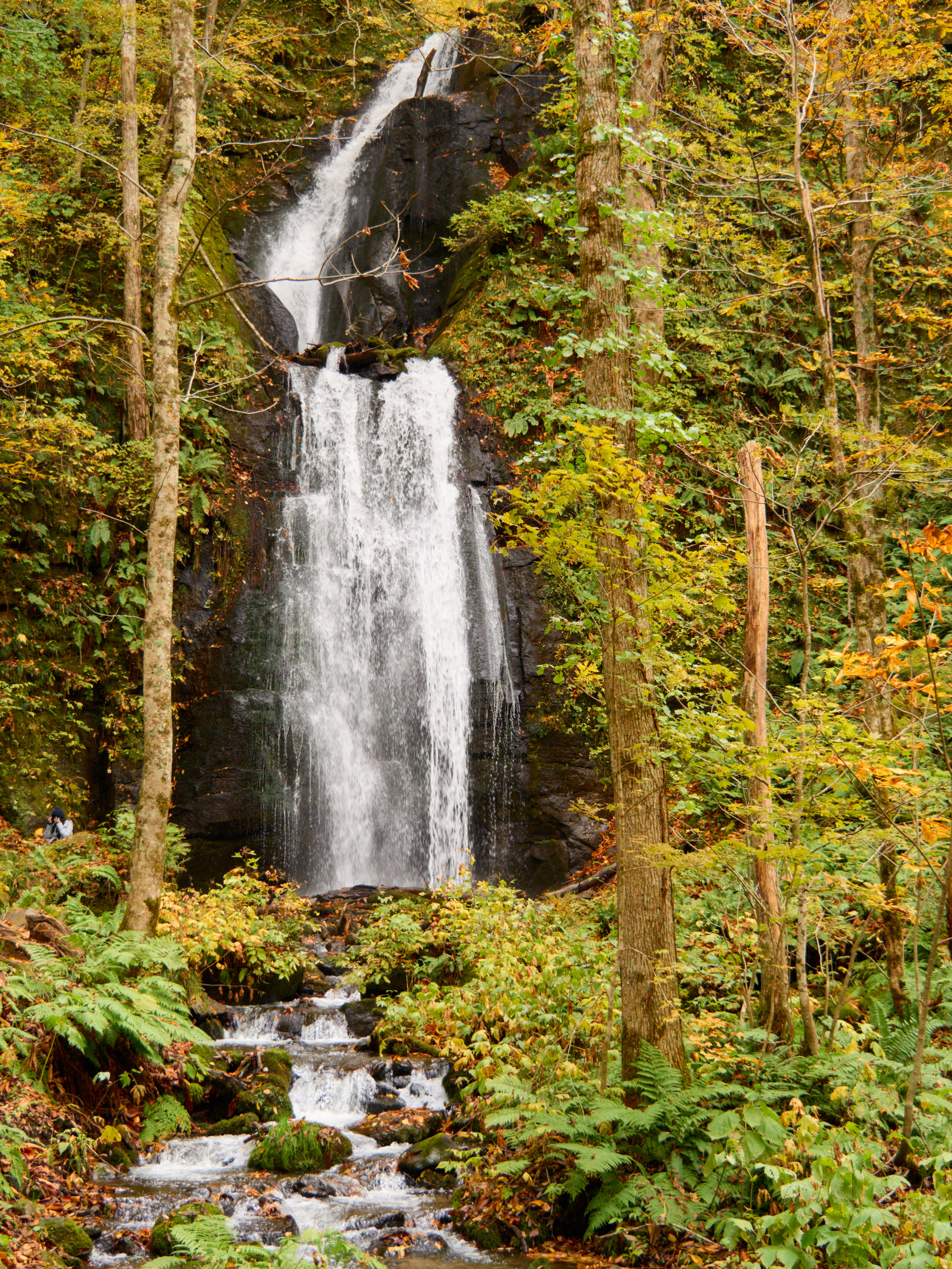
Kumoi Falls in autumn foliage.

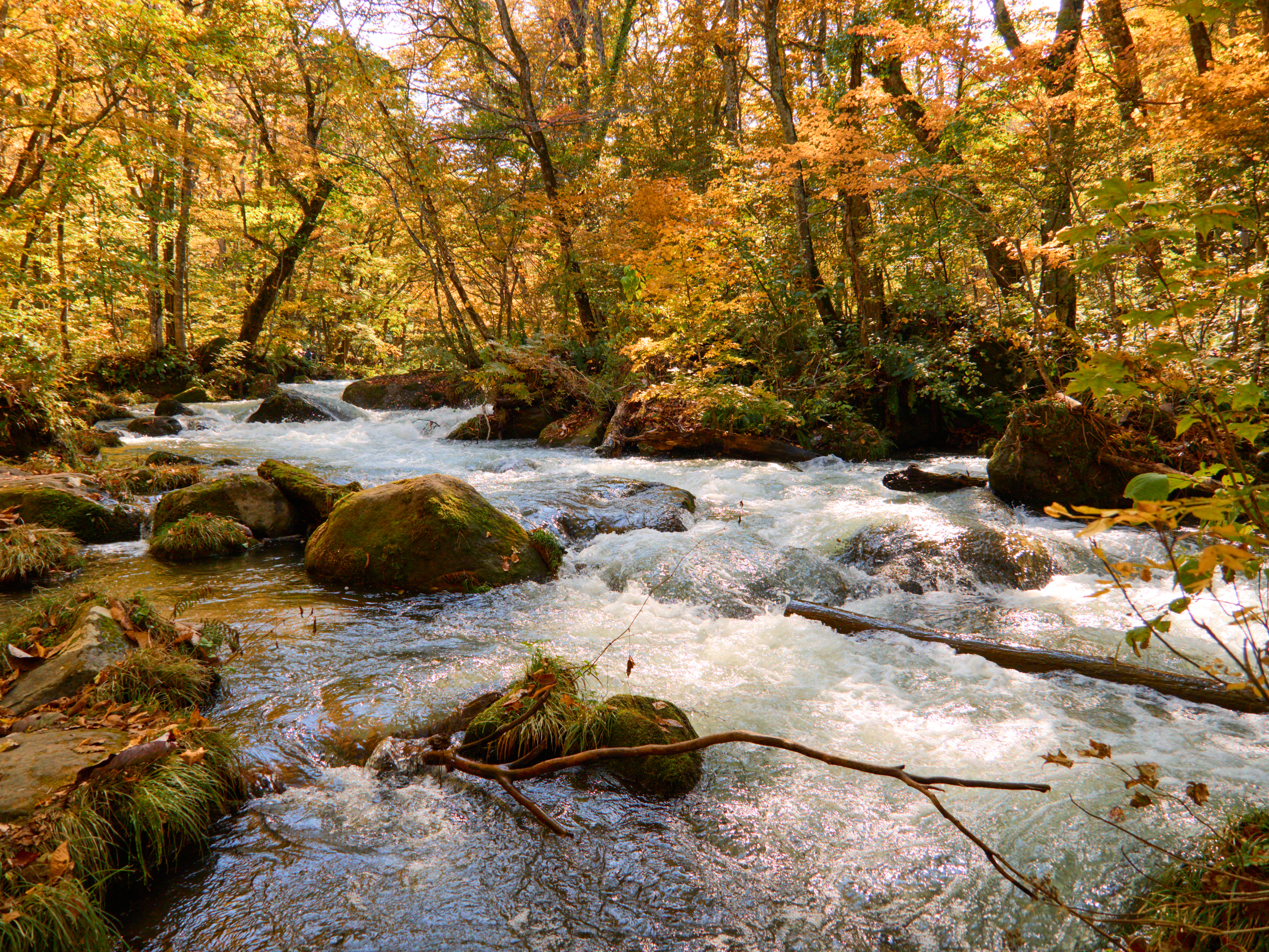
Oirase Stream in autumn
