= Nonai =

Nonai may refer to:

- Nonai, Aomori, a former municipality in Aomori, Aomori, Japan
- Nonai Station, a railway station in Aomori, Aomori, Japan
- Nōnai Poison Berry, an ongoing Japanese slice of life romance josei manga series written and illustrated by Setona Mizushiro.
