= Asamushi-Onsen Station =

Railway station in Aomori, Aomori Prefecture, Japan

Asamushi-Onsen Station 浅虫温泉駅
- Asamushi-Onsen Station in October 2026

General information
- Location: Asamushi, Aomori, Aomori Prefecture 039-3501; Japan
- Coordinates: 40°53′27.56″N 140°51′43.92″E
- System: Regional rail station
- Operator: Aoimori Railway
- Line: ■ Aoimori Railway Line
- Distance: 104.7 km from Metoki; 17.2 km from Aomori
- Platforms: 1 island + 1 side platform

Other information
- Status: Staffed
- Website: Official website

History
- Opened: 1 September 1891
- Former names: Asamushi (until 1986)

Passengers
- 683 daily boardings (2018)

Services
Preceding station	Aoimori Railway	Following station
Nishi-Hiranai towards Metoki	Aoimori Railway Line	Nonai towards Aomori
Location
- Location within Aomori Prefecture Location within Japan

Asamushi-Onsen Station (浅虫温泉駅, Asamushi-Onsen-eki) is a railway station and major stop along the Aoimori Railway Line in the city of Aomori in Aomori Prefecture, Japan. It is operated by the third sector railway operator Aoimori Railway Company.

Passenger trains serve the station 17 and a half hours a day; the departure time between trains is roughly 30 minutes during the morning peak with reduced frequency at other times. The station also serves as a bus station for Aomori City Bus and Shimokita Kōtsu, with local bus routes connecting the station to communities throughout the city of Aomori and neighboring Hiranai.

== Location ==
Asamushi-Onsen Station is one of six principal stations served by the Aoimori Railway Line, and is 104.7 kilometers (65.1 mi) from the terminus of the line at Metoki Station. It is 722.0 kilometers (448.6 mi) from Tokyo.

=== Surrounding area ===
- Asamushi Aquarium
- Asamushi Onsen
- Asamushi-Natsudomari Prefectural Natural Park
- Asamushi Post Office
- National Route 4

== Station layout ==
Asamushi-Onsen Station has an island platform and a side platform serving three tracks. The platform is connected to the station building by a footbridge. The station building is attended from 6:30 a.m. to 5:30 p.m.

=== Platforms ===
1	■ Aoimori Railway Line	for Noheji, Misawa and Hachinohe
2	■ Aoimori Railway Line	(not normally used)
3	■ Aoimori Railway Line	for Aomori

== History ==
The station opened on 1 September 1891, as Asamushi Station (浅虫駅, Asamushi-eki) on the Nippon Railway. It became a station on the Tōhoku Main Line of the Japanese Government Railways (JGR), the pre-war predecessor to the Japanese National Railways (JNR), after the nationalization of the Nippon Railway on 1 November 1906. Regularly scheduled freight services were discontinued in February 1962. The station was renamed as Asamushi-Onsen Station on 1 November 1986. With the privatization of JNR on 1 April 1987, it came under the operational control of East Japan Railway Company (JR East).

The section of the Tōhoku Main Line including this station was transferred to Aoimori Railway on 4 December 2010.

== Services ==
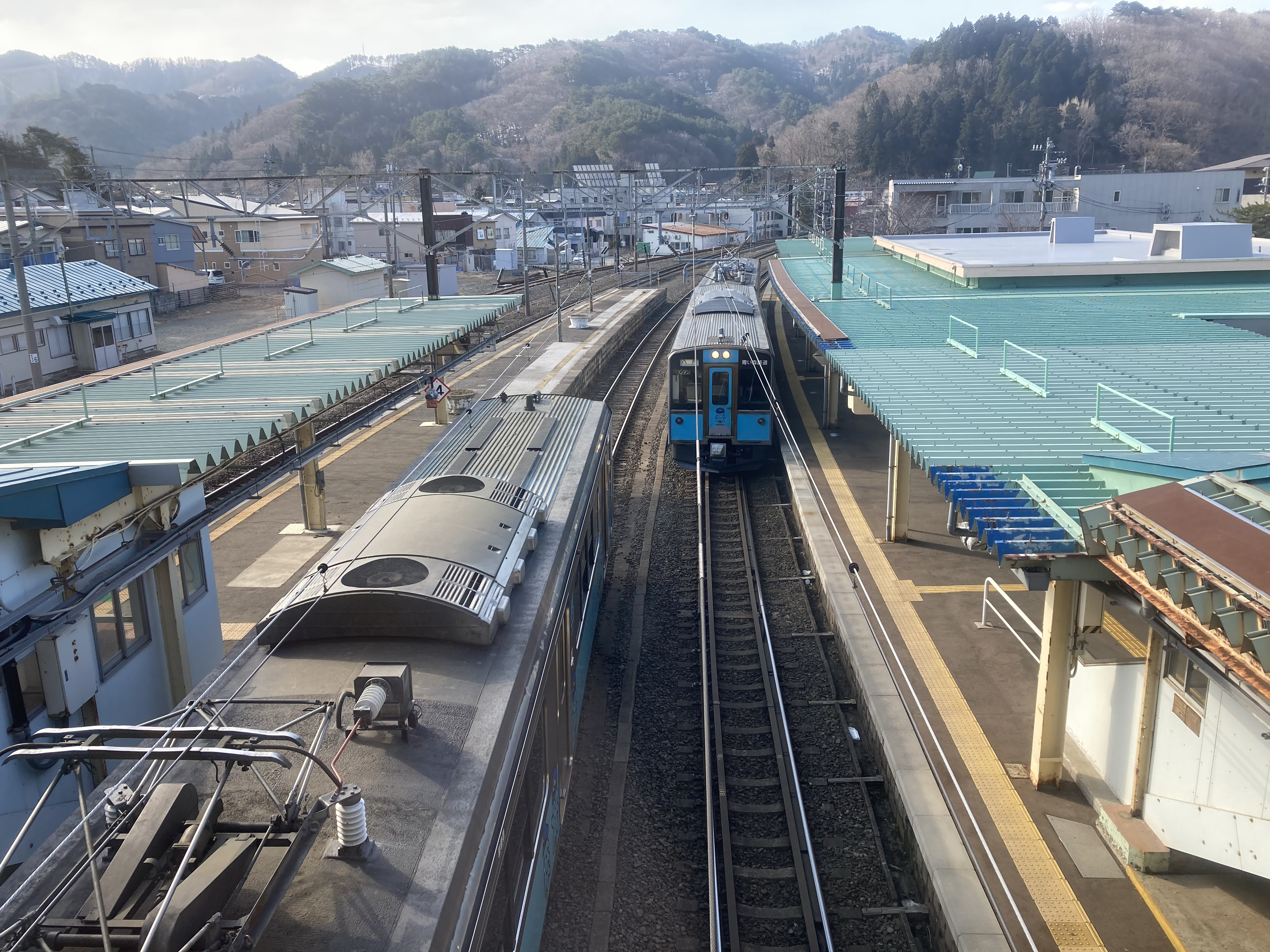
Aomori and Hachinohe-bound Aoimori 701 series sets at Asamushi-Onsen Station.

The station is primarily served by trains operating on a local service on the Aoimori Railway Line between Aomori and Hachinohe. It is served by one express train, the 560M train operated jointly by the Aoimori Railway and the Iwate Galaxy Railway between Aomori and Morioka. Passenger trains serve Asamushi-Onsen Station for 17 and a half hours each day from 6:01 am to 11:31 pm. At peak hours between the first train and 9:16 am, trains depart from the station roughly every 30 minutes; otherwise trains depart at an approximate hourly basis. In 2018, a daily average of 683 passengers boarded trains at Asamushi-Onsen Station, an increase from the daily average of 330 passengers the station served in 2010, the final year of its ownership by JR East. In 2018, the station was the ninth busiest on the Aoimori Railway Line, excluding Aomori and Hachinohe stations, and the least busiest along the line in the city of Aomori.

=== Bus services ===
- Aomori City Bus
  - Aomori Station via Nonai
- Shimokita Kōtsu
  - Mutsu Bus Terminal via Hiranai, Noheji Station, Arito Station, Yokohama, Chikagawa Station
  - Shin-Aomori Station via Aomori Prefectural Office

== See also ==
- List of railway stations in Japan
