= 小柳駅 =

小柳駅 may refer to:

- Koyanagi Station
- Oyanagi Station
