= Yadamae Station =

Railway station in Aomori, Aomori Prefecture, Japan

Yadamae Station 矢田前駅
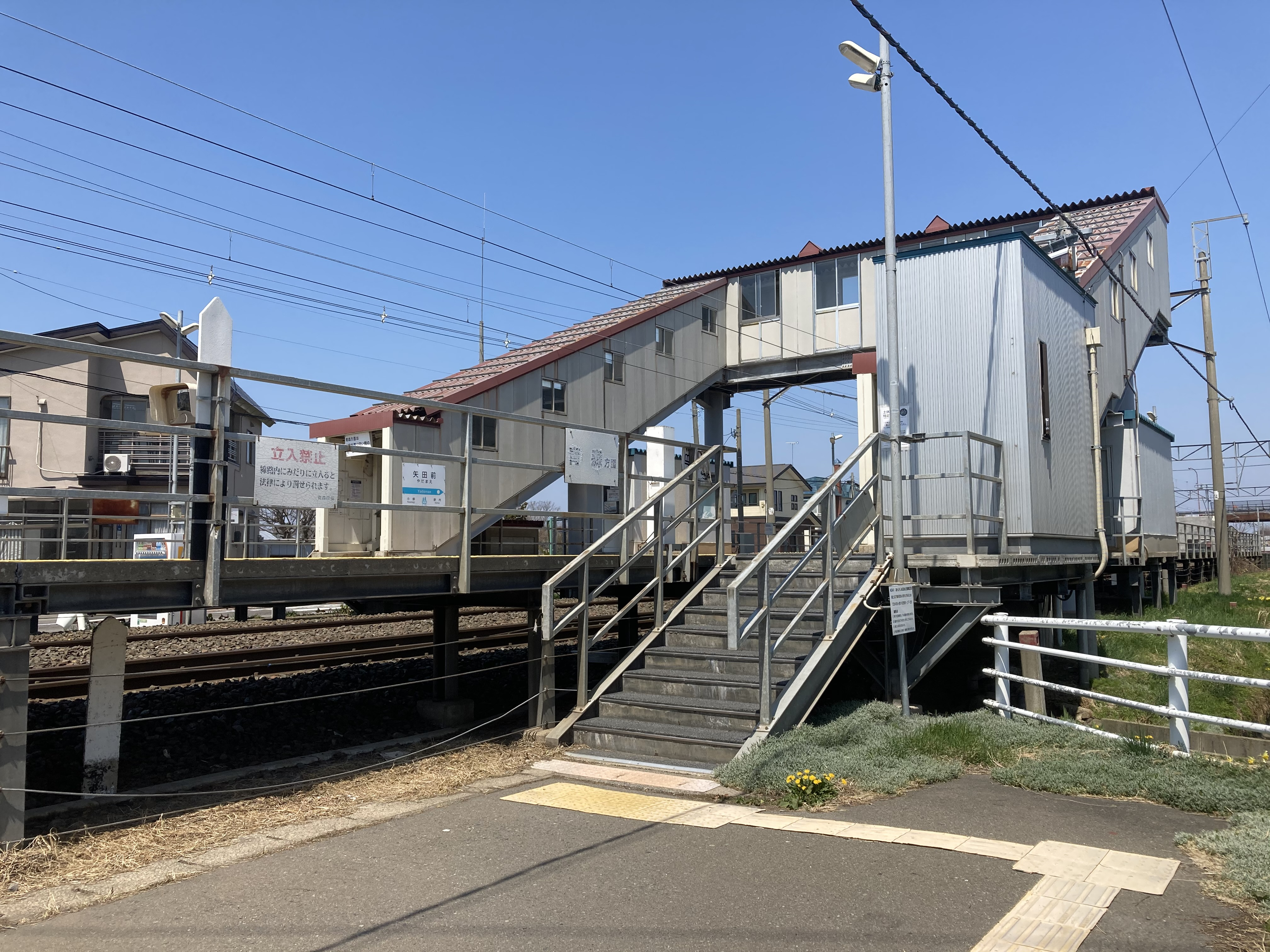
- Yadamae Station in April 2021

General information
- Location: 2-2 Motoizumi, Aomori, Aomori Prefecture 030-0937; Japan
- Coordinates: 40°50′02″N 140°48′26″E
- System: Regional rail station
- Operator: Aoimori Railway
- Line: ■ Aoimori Railway Line
- Distance: 112.7 km from Metoki
- Platforms: 2 side platforms

Other information
- Status: Unstaffed
- Website: Official website

History
- Opened: 1 November 1986

Passengers
- 1,309 daily boardings (2018)

Services
Preceding station	Aoimori Railway	Following station
Nonai towards Metoki	Aoimori Railway Line	Koyanagi towards Aomori
Location
- Location within Aomori Prefecture Location within Japan

Yadamae Station (矢田前駅, Yadamae-eki) is a railway station on the Aoimori Railway Line is a railway station in the city of Aomori in Aomori Prefecture, Japan, operated by the third sector railway operator Aoimori Railway Company.

== Location ==
Yadamae Station is served by the Aoimori Railway Line, and is 112.7 kilometers from the terminus of the line at Metoki Station. It is 730.0 kilometers from Tokyo.

=== Surrounding area ===
- Aomori-Higashi High School
- Harabetsu Post Office
- Aomori city hall Harabetsu branch

== Station layout ==
Yadamae Station has two opposed side platforms, that are connected to the station building by a footbridge. The station is unattended.

=== Platforms ===
1	■ Aoimori Railway Line	for Noheji, Misawa and Hachinohe
2	■ Aoimori Railway Line	for Aomori

== History ==
Yadamae Station was opened on 1 November 1986 as a station on the Japan National Railways' (JNR) Tōhoku Main Line. With the privatization of the JNR on 1 April 1987, it came under the operational control of East Japan Railway Company (JR East). On 4 December 2010, the Tōhoku Shinkansen was successfully extended north to Shin-Aomori Station from Hachinohe. As a result of the opening of the bullet train between the two stations, that section of the Tōhoku Main Line including this station was transferred to the Aoimori Railway Company from JR East on the same day.

== Services ==
Yadamae Station is primarily served by trains operating on a local service on the Aoimori Railway Line between Aomori and Hachinohe. It is served by one rapid express train, the 560M train operated jointly by the Aoimori Railway and the Iwate Galaxy Railway between Aomori and Morioka. Passenger trains serve Yadamae Station over 17 and a half hours a day from 5:54 am to 11:39 pm. At peak hours between the first train and 9:37 am, trains depart from the station roughly every 30 minutes; otherwise trains depart at an approximate hourly basis. In 2018, a daily average of 1,309 passengers boarded trains at Yadamae Station, an increase from the daily average of 913 passengers the station served in 2011, the first year of its ownership by the Aoimori Railway Company. In 2018, the station was the fifth busiest on the Aoimori Railway Line, excluding Aomori and Hachinohe stations. It is the third busiest station along the Aoimori Railway Line in the city of Aomori.

=== Bus services ===
- Higashi-Kōkō-Mae bus stop
  - Aomori City Bus
    - For Aomori Station
    - For Yada
    - For Tōbu-Eigyōsho
    - For Tsukinokidate

== See also ==
- List of railway stations in Japan
