= Asamushi Onsen =

Hot spring in Aomori Prefecture, Japan

Asamushi Onsen 浅虫温泉
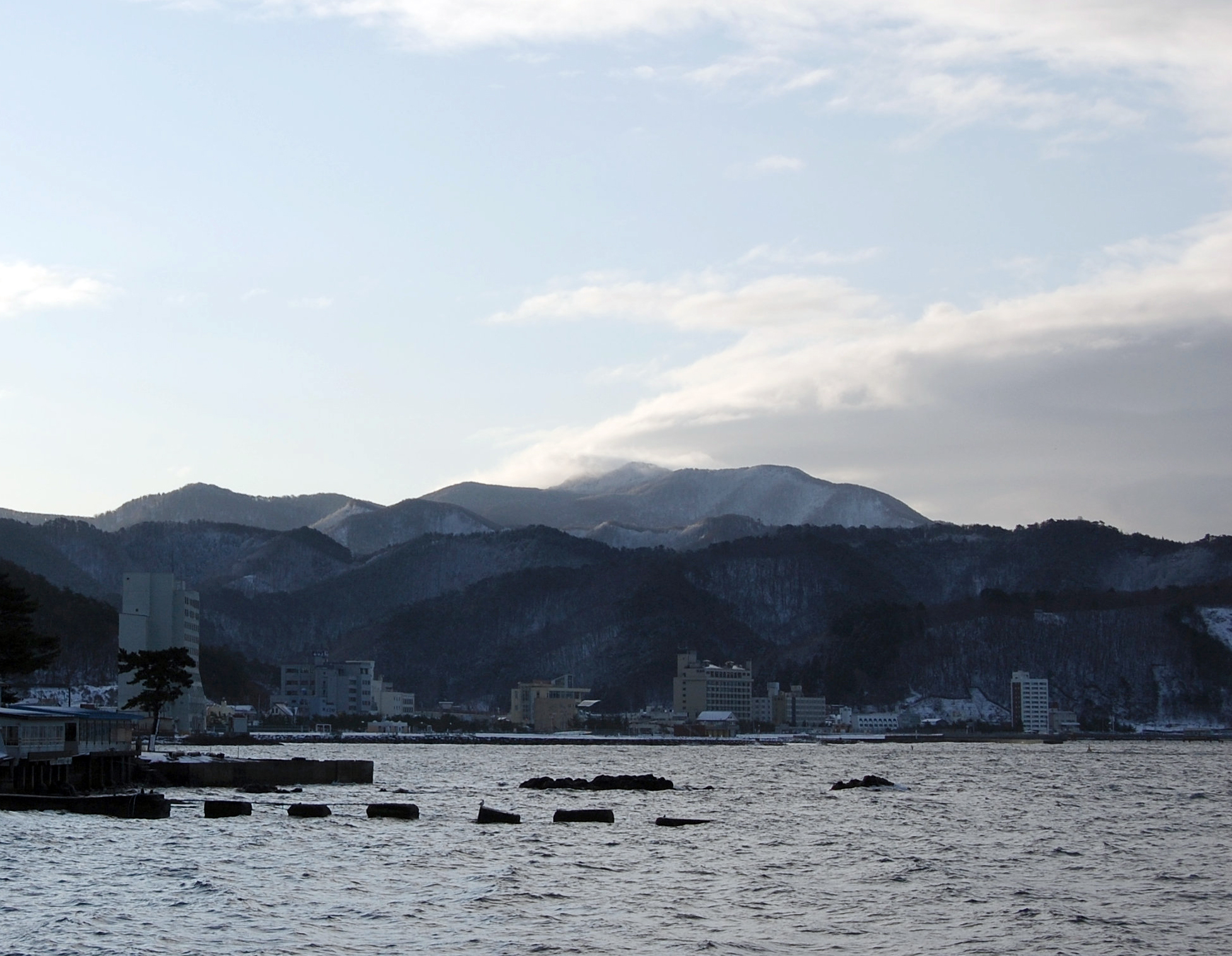
- Asamushi Onsen from Aomori Bay

- Location within Aomori Prefecture Location within Japan
- Location: Aomori, Japan
- Coordinates: 40°53′21″N 140°51′41″E
- Elevation: 0 m (0 ft)
- Type: saline
- Temperature: 30-78 deg C

Asamushi Onsen (浅虫温泉) is the site of a hot spring, on the eastern edge of the city of Aomori in Aomori Prefecture, Japan. It was developed as the downtown beside the onsen town and is sometimes known as "Atami in Tohoku" after the famous Atami Onsen in Shizuoka, central Japan.

== History ==
According to tradition, the hot spring was discovered by Hōnen when he visited Mutsu Province c. 1190 during the Heian period. It is said that he witnessed deer bathing in the water to heal their wounds. An older legend attributes the discovery to Ennin. In both cases, the locals were not aware of the healing properties of the hot springs until they were told by the monk. It was first used for steaming (mushi) hemp (Cannabis or asa), leading to the name, though the kanji character used for the name differs.

=== Modern Japan ===
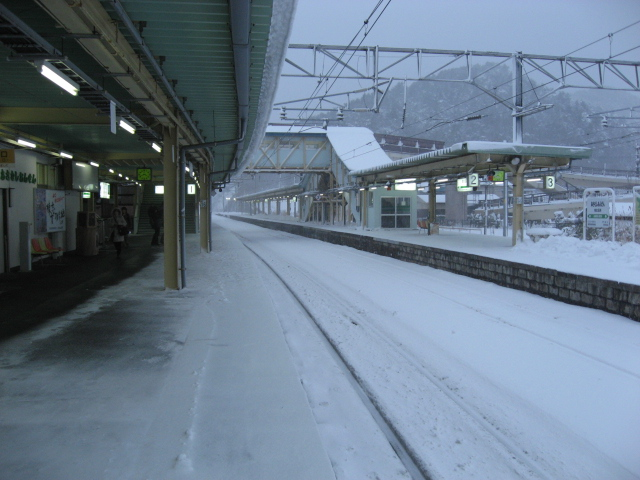
Asamushi-Onsen Station platform

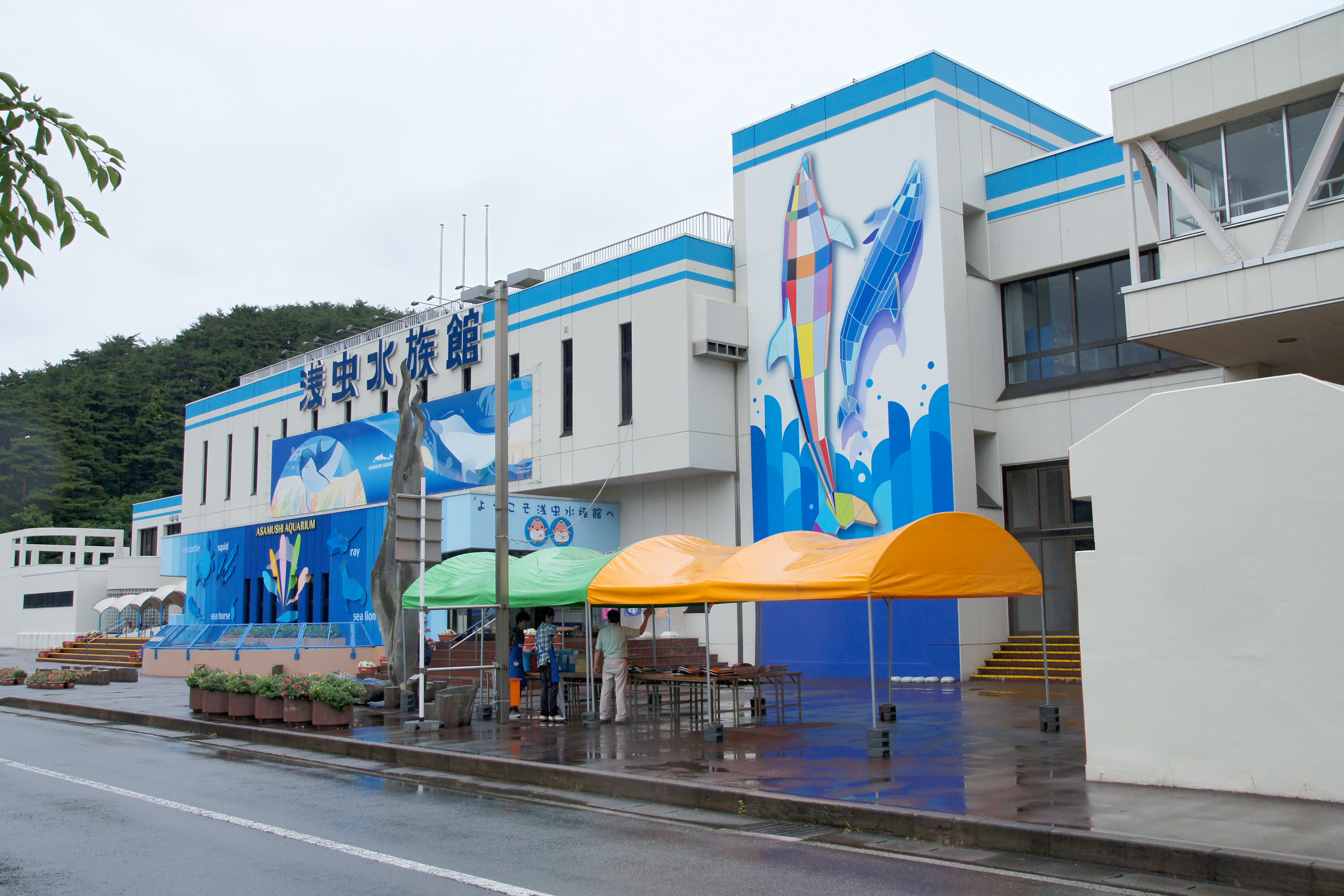
Asamushi Aquarium

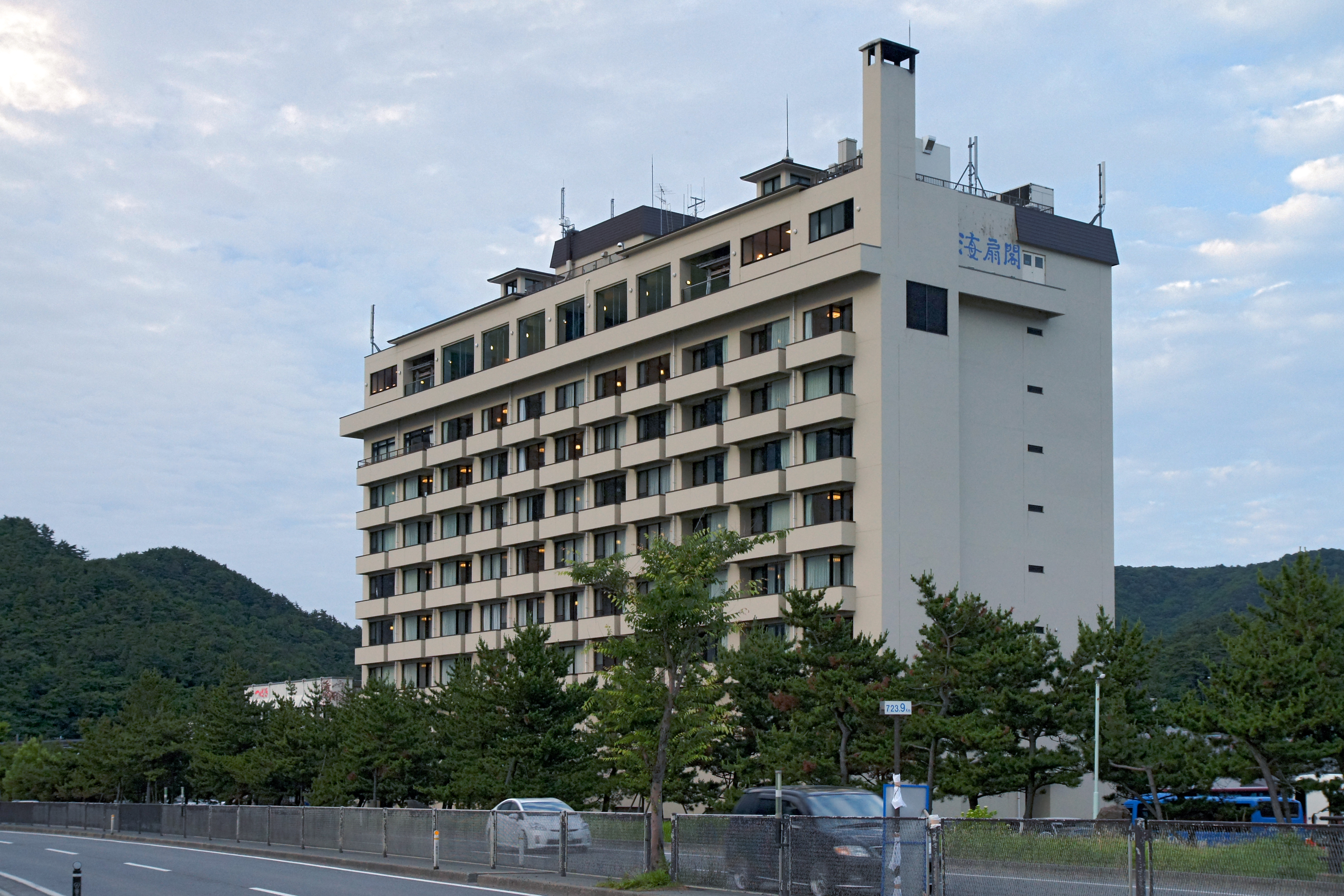
Accommodation at Asamushi Onsen

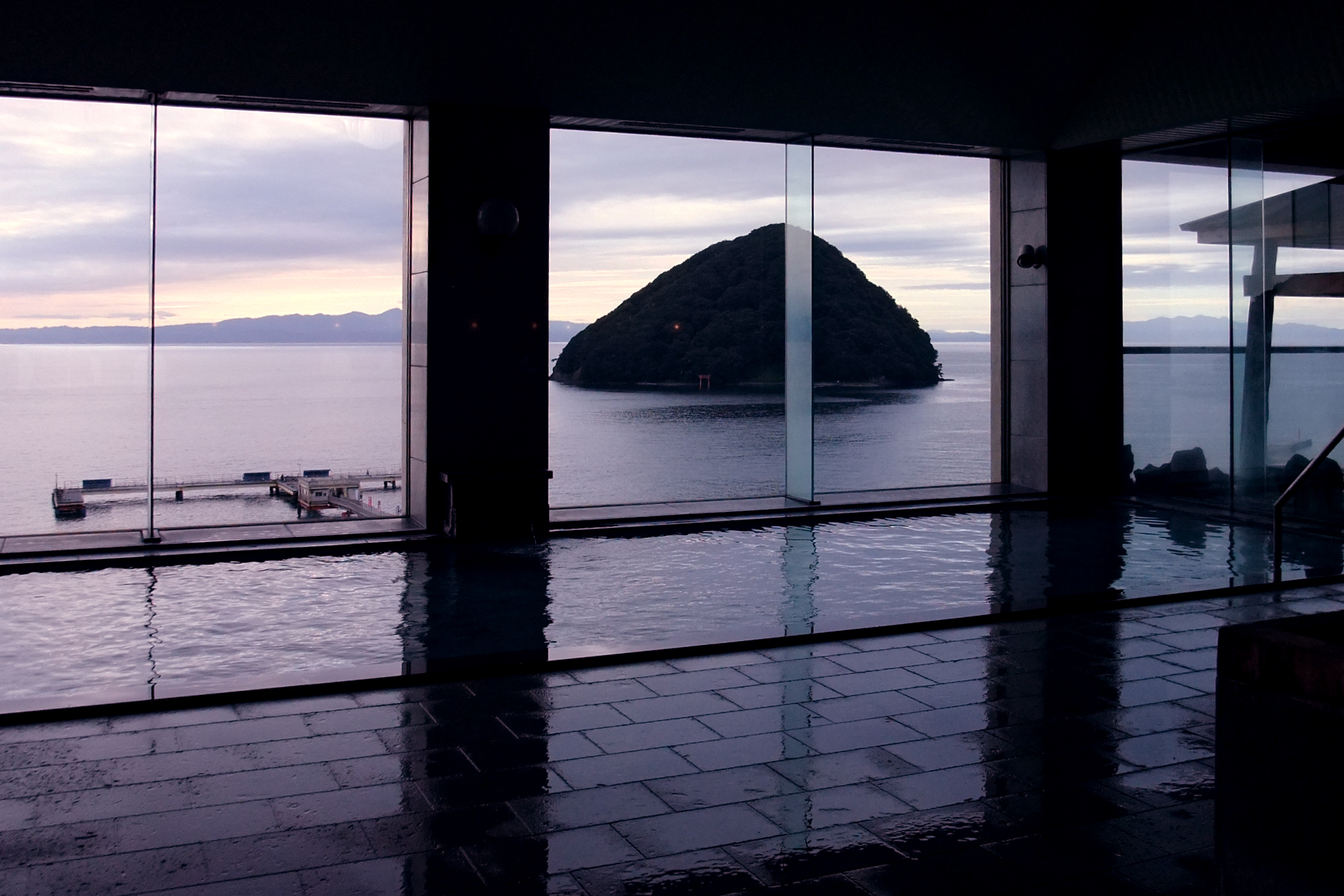
A public bath overlooking Yunoshima

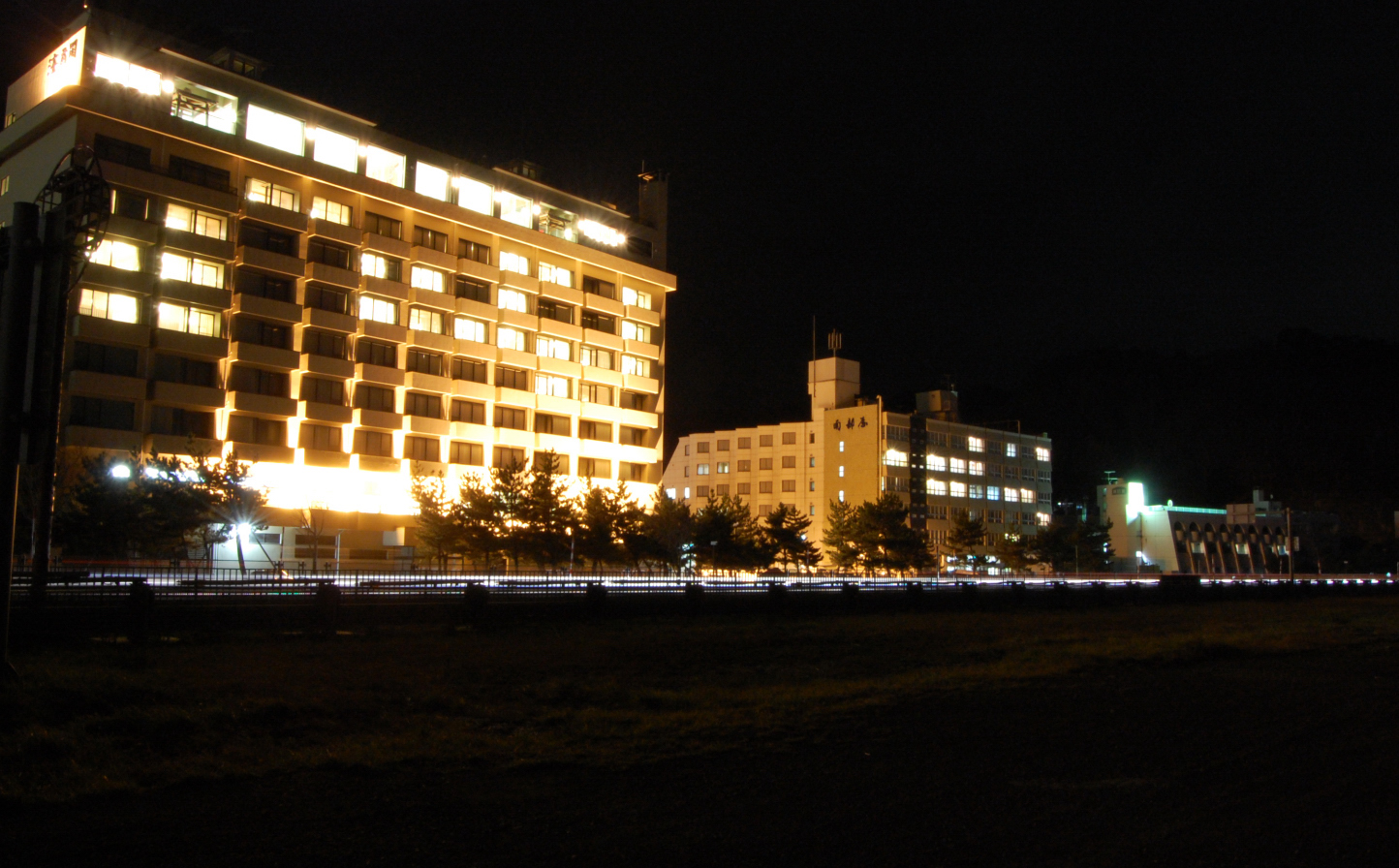
Night-view of lodgings at Asamushi Onsen

==== Early Meiji period ====
Asamushi Onsen as it was at the start of the Meiji period was recorded in a compilation of topographies published by the government in 1876. According to this, though Asamushi Onsen was known as a spa town, the locals were only just managing to get by from what few customers would come visit. As such, many of them worked away in Ezo. At this time, Asamushi Onsen was deemed a "rustic" hot spring area, with 18 guest houses built for those visiting the hot springs. There were small merchants in the area, but no transportation.

There is around 11.8 km between West Aomori and Asamushi Onsen, but along the way is a perilous pass known as Utōmai, which had no developed roads passing through it. Utōmai is a sheer precipice overlooking the sea, and at the time, people passed through it by going alongside the cliff face until they reached the tip of the peninsula, and then crossing a bridge over the rocks. Around 1862, the old village of Nonai dug out the rock wall and made space for a road, but it was not very wide, making it hard for horses to make their way through.

In 1876, Emperor Meiji visited Asamushi Onsen during his tour of Hokkaido. At the time, he was being transported in a palanquin with his attendants on horseback, but it was deemed too dangerous for them to pass through the steep roads of Utōmai. This was why the mountain side of the cliff was carved out, and the sea side was filled in and widened to 5 metres wide, making it possible for horses and cattle to pass through. Tunnels were later built and expanded, making it an important route connecting the east and west of Aomori Prefecture.

==== Mid-Late Meiji period ====
In 1891, the Tōhoku Main Line was fully operational connecting Tokyo and Aomori by train, and Asamushi Station was opened. This was the driving force behind the gradual development of the hot spring town. The establishment of the station not only improved transportation links, but also served as a place for passengers travelling between Honshu and Hokkaido to rest their bodies during their long journey, or as a place to stay if bad weather conditions made it impossible to safely pass through the Tsugaru Strait. The area became more known outside of Aomori Prefecture after being used as a resting place for the survivors of the Hakkōda Mountains incident in 1902, and for soldiers injured during the Russo-Japanese War of 1905.

==== Taishō period ====
At the start of the Taishō period (1912-1926), Asamushi Onsen greatly developed due to the increase in visitors the war economy brought. In 1924, the Marine Biological Station (the predecessor of today's Research Centre for Marine Biology) of the then Tōhoku Imperial University, was founded in Asamushi. Asamushi Aquarium was built there and became one of the most popular aquariums in Japan at the time. In 1925, the Seiyukan was opened in Babayama. It was a hot spring facility with a theatre, a dining room, an entertainment room, an observatory and a banquet hall. It was expanded a year later to include lodgings and began to prosper greatly. This opportunity was used to increase the number of inns being built and renovated in the area, and before long, the area became an entertainment district with over 150 geisha and prostitutes.

==== Early Shōwa period ====
Though Aomori Prefecture is known for its cold winters, Asamushi Onsen's winters are mild and has become a year-round leisure destination: clam digging in spring, swimming in summer, fireworks displays in autumn, and skiing in winter. In 1936, the Towada-Hachimantai National Park was established in the same prefecture, but while it became popular as a tourist area due to its untouched nature, Asamushi Onsen became popular due to its gathering of cultural and leisure facilities. In 1939, the Aomori Sanatorium for Wounded Soldiers (predecessor of the Aomori National Hospital) was established near Asamushi Onsen, and a new station, Nishi-Hiranai Station, was built to accommodate visitors.

Asamushi is mentioned in the 1944 novel, Tsugaru (often titled Return to Tsugaru: Travels of a Purple Tramp) written by Osamu Dazai.

==== Culture ====
Shikō Munakata, born in the city of Aomori, left for Tokyo in 1924 to achieve his dream of becoming a painter. His attention then shifted to the art of woodblock printing, and in 1938, he finally managed to have a print of Asamushi's Utōmai accepted for the Nitten Exhibition. Excluding the year of the Pacific War, Munakata visited Asamushi Onsen every year and would stay for around one to two months. There still remains Buddhist pictures that he painted for the inn that he would stay at.

Kujira mochi is Asamushi Onsen's signature sweet. The recipe for the sweet was learned by a confectionary shop at Asamushi Onsen from another confectioner in Ajigasawa of the Tsugaru Region. It was created in 1907, when injured or sick soldiers during the Russo-Japanese War were kept at Asamushi Onsen. These sweets became popular as a souvenir due to their cheap price, shelf life and ease of carrying around. It also became known as a military discharge souvenir. In 1918, it was presented at a trade show, garnering it even more attention.

==== Current day ====
The hot spring resort was originally developed along the coastline, but a bypass was built that separated the resort and the sea. Some of the facilities had been built in such a way that they overlooked the sea from the guest rooms or the baths. As a result, old-fashioned hot spring inns lined the mountains, while large hotels were built along the seaside. In 1986, Asamushi Umizuri Park was built on the beach. This was a place to fish in Mutsu Bay from the pier, though a small pond was dug out for beginners. The park attracted over 30,000 visitors in its first year of operation.

The number of visitors to Asamushi Onsen has declined since the end of the bubble economy. The number of guests shrank from 295,000 in 1991 to 166,000 in 2016. The number of accommodations and restaurants has been cut in half compared to when it was at its most popular, and both Asamushi Elementary School and Asamushi Middle School were closed in 2013 and 2015, respectively. In 2017, a major hotel management company in the area also went out of business.

The local Michinoku Bank and operators of the inns are working together to revive the hot spring area. As part of the efforts to revitalise the area, Aomori Prefecture has been conducting research on the use of ground heat using heat pumps, and is considering geothermal power generation using hot spring heat as a renewable energy source, but this has yet to be realised due to issues such as profitability.

== Onsen town ==
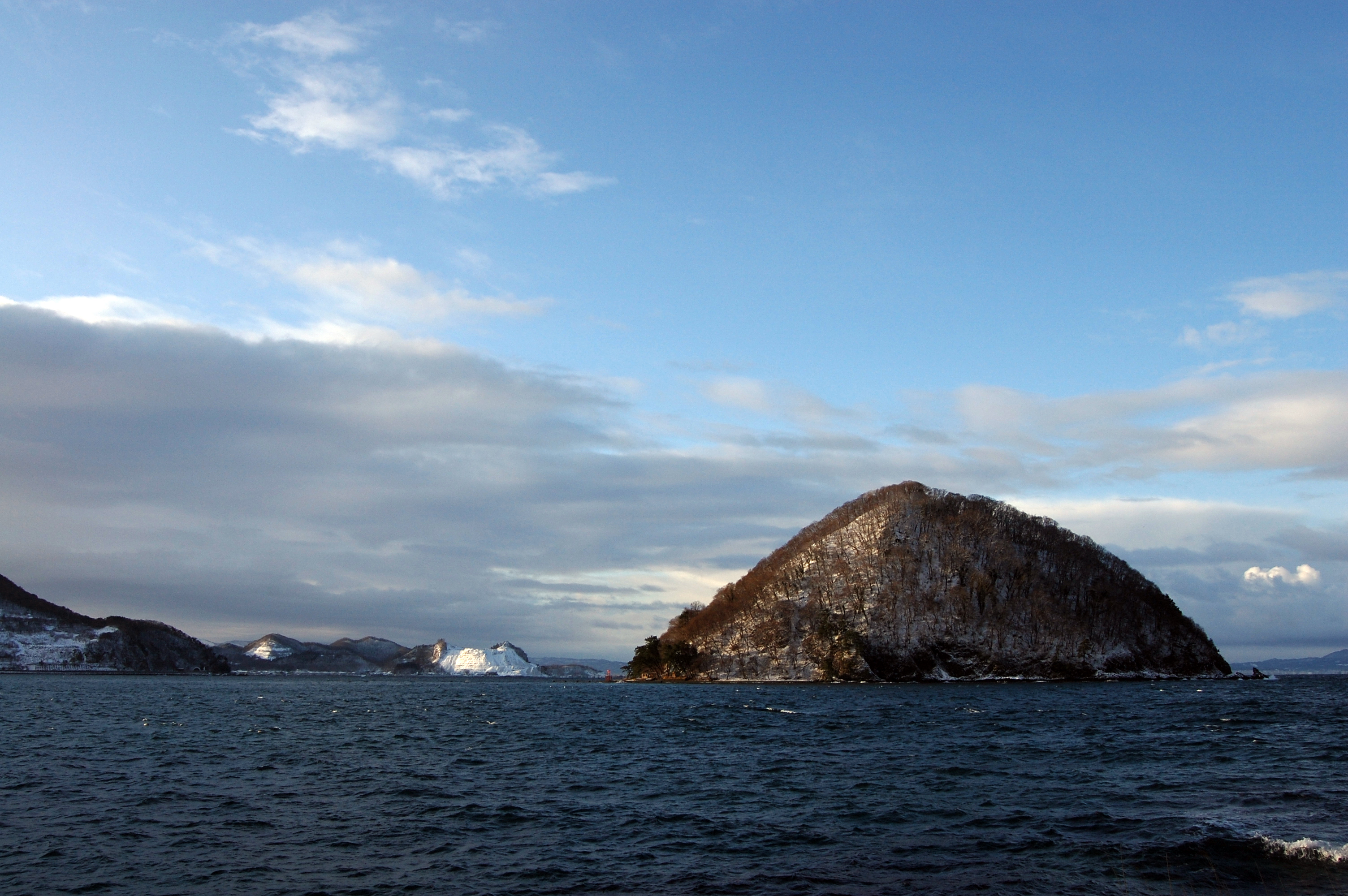
Yunoshima from Asamushi Onsen

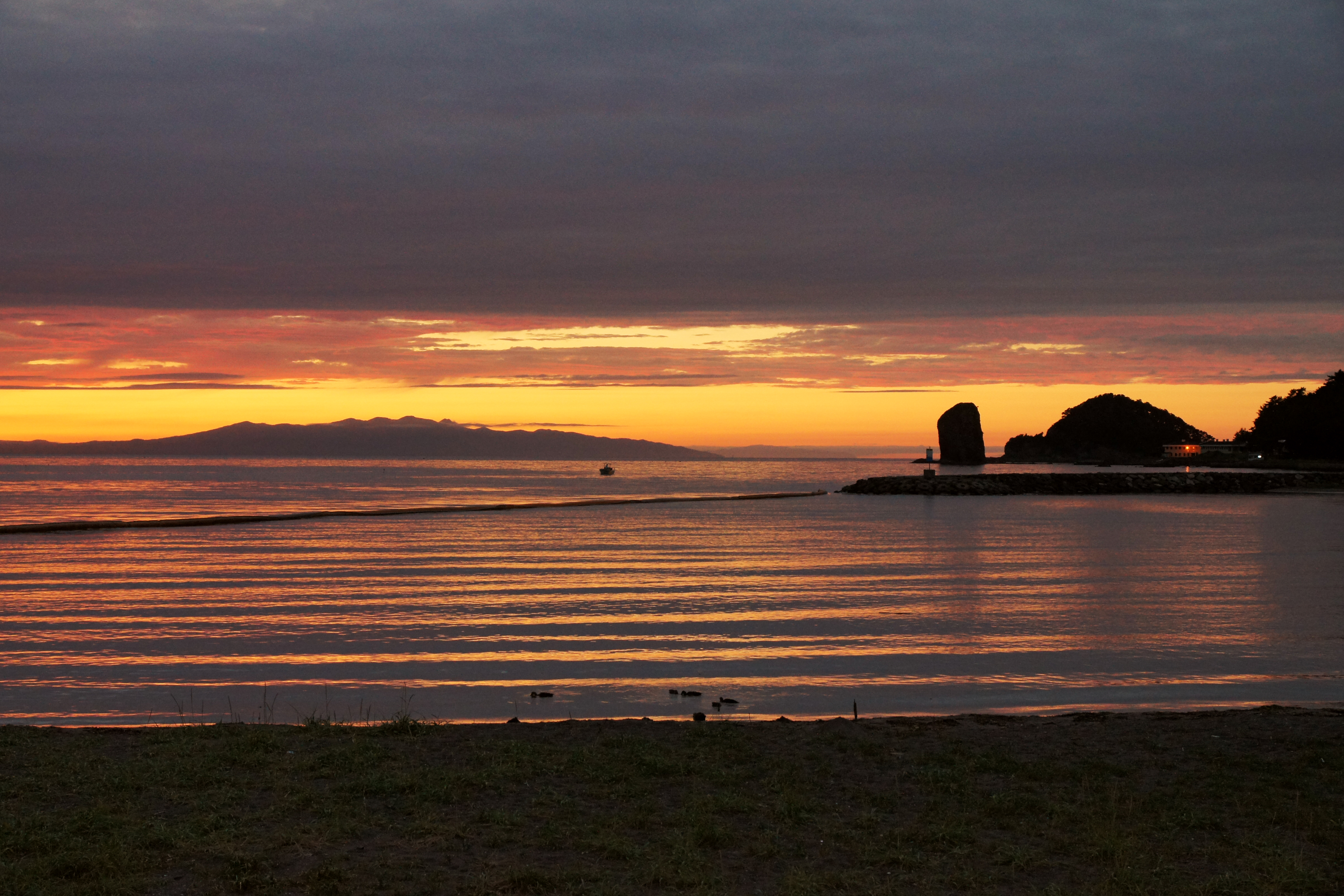
Aomori Bay Asamushi Onsen

About 30 hotels and Japanese-style inns are in the town.

Attractions include the Asamushi Aquarium and the Wonderland Asamushi amusement park.

The Matsu no Yu communal onsen and Michi no Eki Asamushi Onsen are among the bathing facilities. There are hiking trails on the mountains behind the onsen town, with an overlook providing views of Mutsu Bay and the island of Yunoshima.

=== Yunoshima ===
Yunoshima is an uninhabited island 1 km off the coast of the onsen town. Its name comes from the hot spring that gushes out from the waters near the island. Clusters of katakuri (dogtooth violets) can be found there, and in April, the Yunoshima Katakuri Festival is held. There are also boat tours of the rock formations found around the island.

=== Hadakajima ===
Hadakajima is an uninhabited island 1.7 km away from the onsen town on the eastern tip of a cape known as Shiranezaki. Though originally part of the cape itself, it now stands by itself as a rock pillar due to erosion by the waves. A distinctive rhyolite of the Miocene known as Shiranesaki Rhyolite can be found here, but when used for the hot springs, it turns a yellow colour. It has long been a natural part of the scenery seen from Asamushi Onsen's coast. Records from the Edo period state the island as being around 45 metres high. It was originally named Hada-a.k.a. Island. A legend states that when a mother's child was swiped by an eagle and brought to the top of this rock, the mother desperately climbed the rock-face to try and save them. The blood seeping from her fingers as she climbed is where the name is rumoured to have come from. There is also a legend that the name comes from the lack of plant-life growing on the rock. The old Tōhoku University Marine Biological Station (now known as the Research Centre for Marine Biology and the old Asamushi Aquarium) can be found across from it.

== Events ==
- Yunoshima Katakuri Festival in April
- Asamushi Nebuta Festival in mid-July, August 14
- Fireworks on August 1

== Transportation ==
The resort is served by Asamushi-Onsen Station on the Aoimori Railway Line, which connects to the JR East network at Aomori Station, Noheji Station, and Hachinohe Station. Bus access is provided as well at Michinoeki Asamushi-Onsen Station for Aomori City buses and Shimokita Kotsu buses. Visitors traveling to the resort by automobile can take National Route 4 east from the center of Aomori; the trip takes about 30 minutes on average.

== Gallery ==
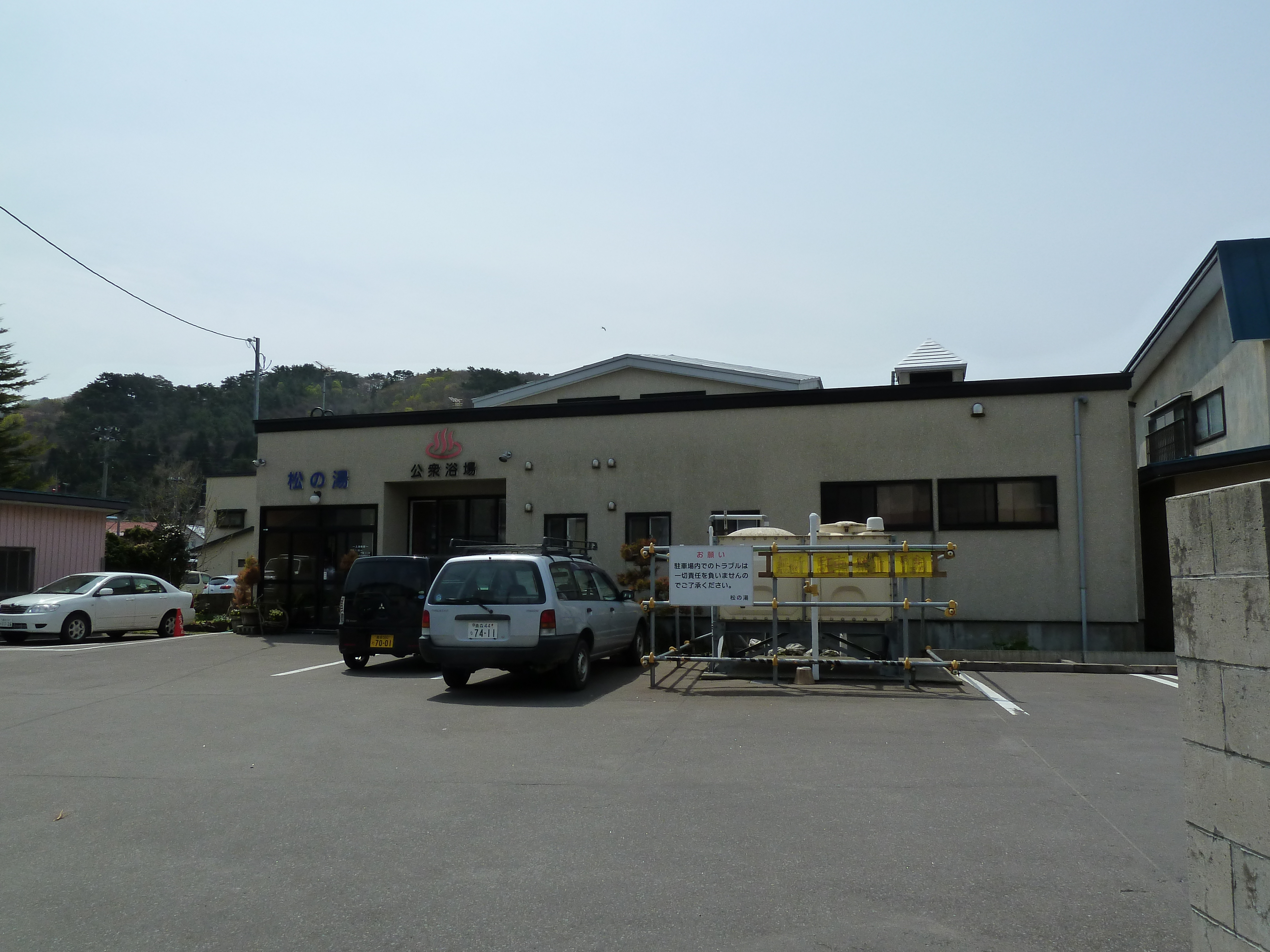
Matsunoyu

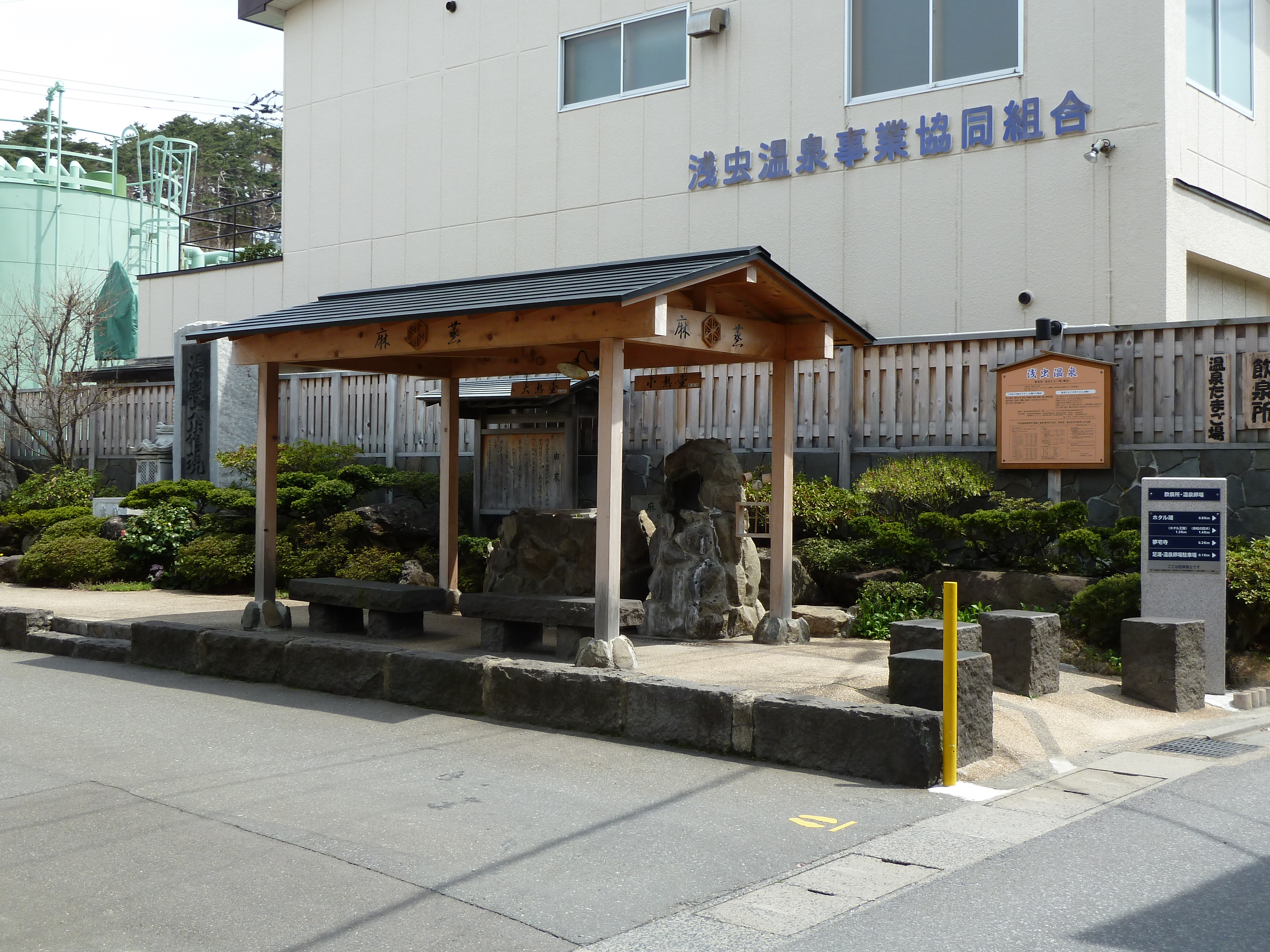
Drinkable onsen water

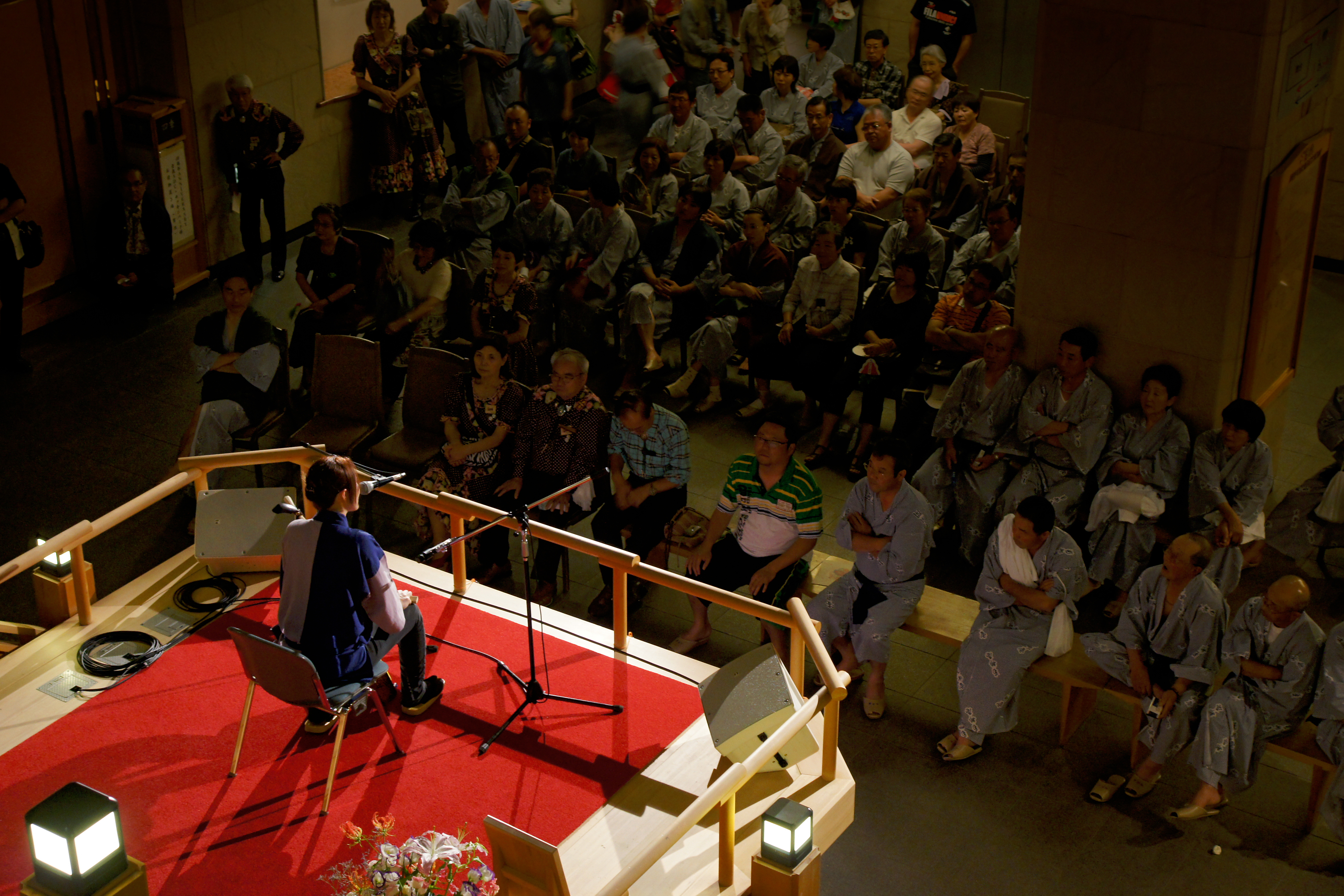
Live performance of Tsugaru-jamisen

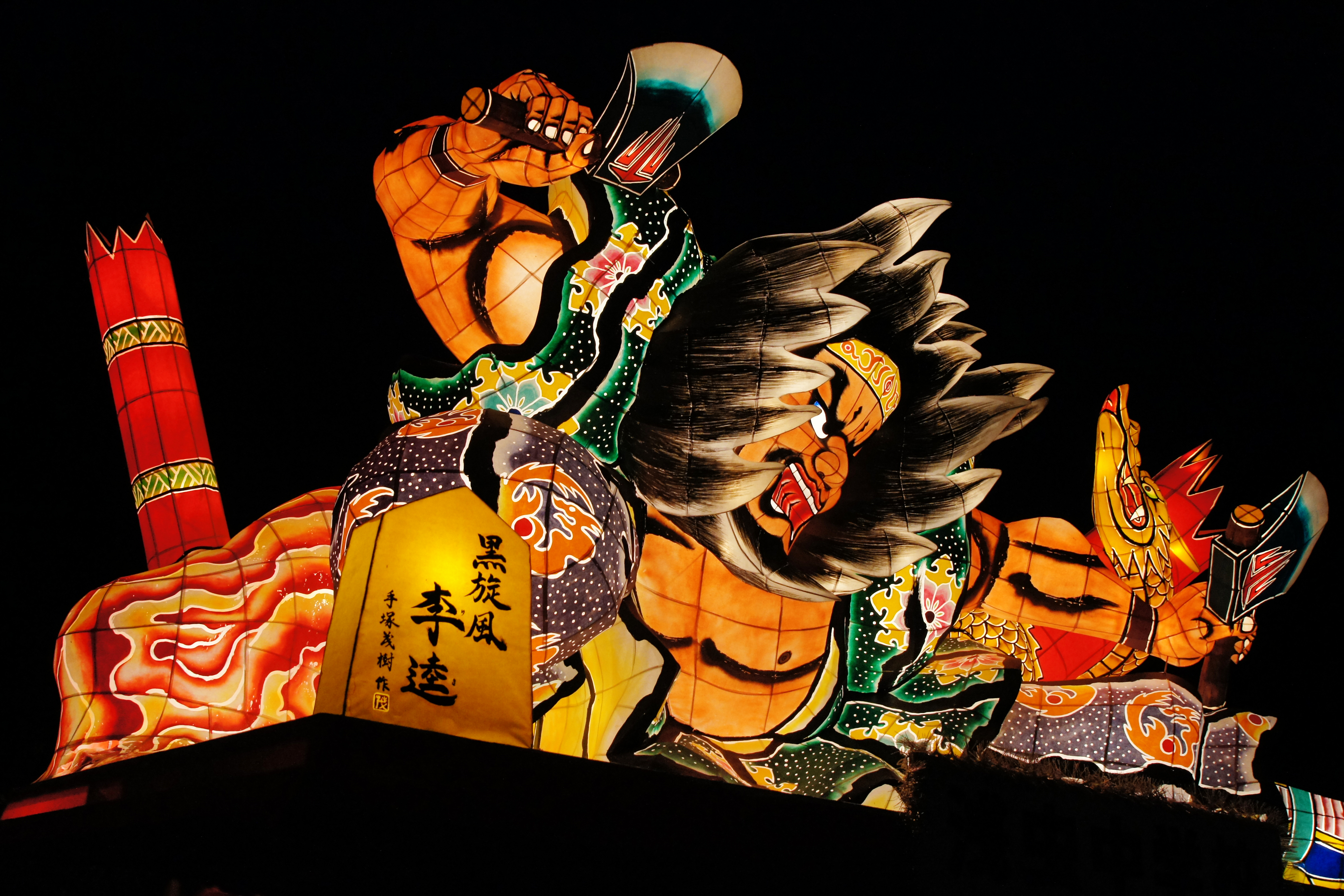
Asamushi Onsen Nebuta Festival
