= Koyanagi Station =

Railway station in Aomori, Aomori Prefecture, Japan

Koyanagi Station 小柳駅
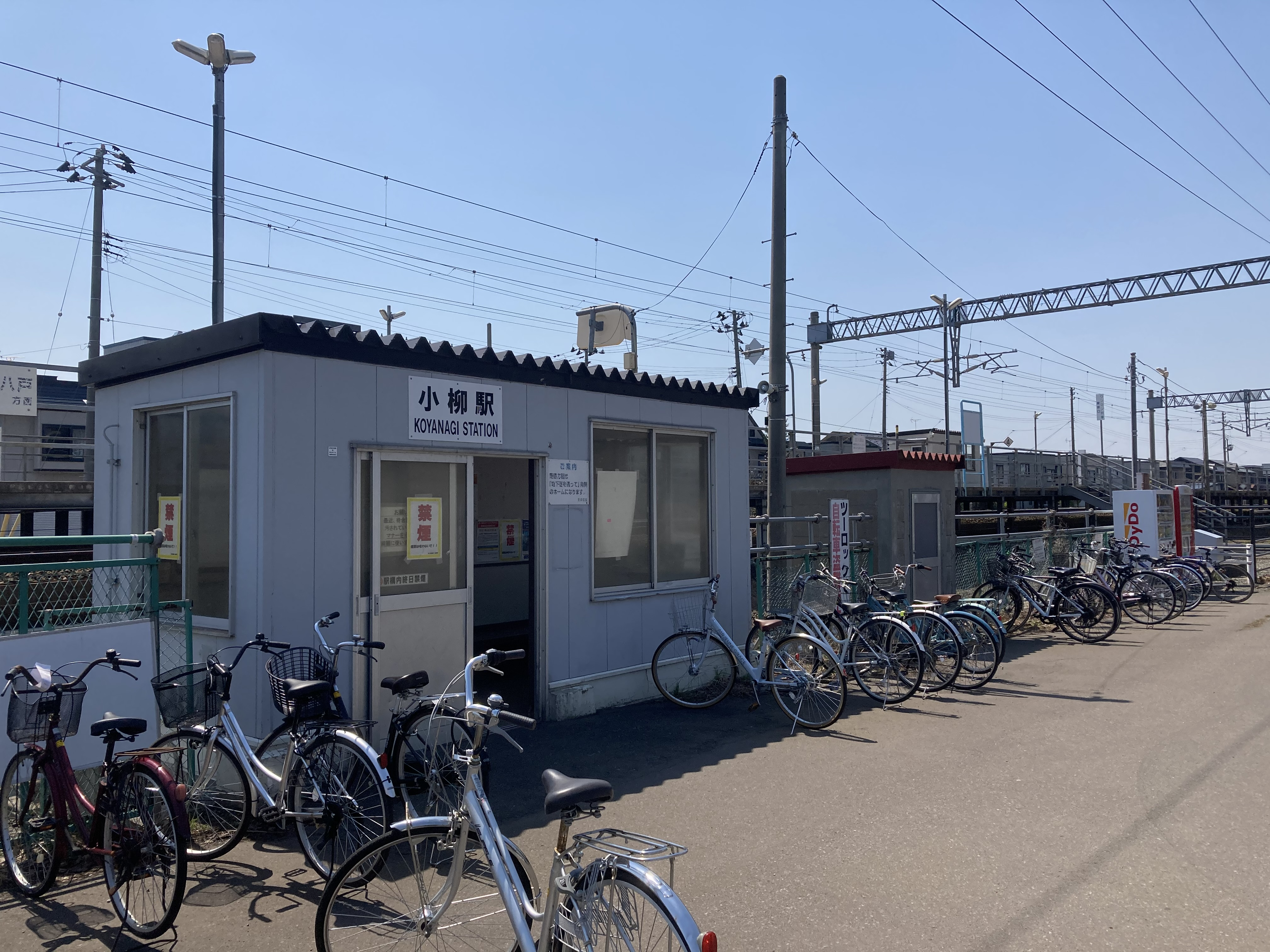
- Koyanagi Station as seen from the north in April 2021

General information
- Location: Koyanagi 4-chōme, Aomori, Aomori Prefecture 030-0915; Japan
- Coordinates: 40°49′5.6″N 140°47′53.3″E
- System: Regional rail station
- Operator: Aoimori Railway
- Line: ■ Aoimori Railway Line
- Distance: 114.7 km from Metoki
- Platforms: 2 side platforms

Other information
- Status: Unstaffed
- Website: Official website

History
- Opened: 1 November 1986

Passengers
- 1,085 daily boardings (2018)

Services
Preceding station	Aoimori Railway	Following station
Yadamae towards Metoki	Aoimori Railway Line	Higashi-Aomori towards Aomori
Location
- Location within Aomori Prefecture Location within Japan

Koyanagi Station (小柳駅, Koyanagi-eki) is a railway station on the Aoimori Railway Line is a railway station in the city of Aomori in Aomori Prefecture, Japan, operated by the third sector railway operator Aoimori Railway Company.

== Location ==
Koyanagi Station is served by the Aoimori Railway Line, and is 114.7 kilometers from the terminus of the line at Metoki Station. It is 732.0 kilometers from Tokyo.

=== Surrounding area ===
- Koyanagi Elementary School

== Station layout ==
Koyanagi Station has two unnumbered opposed side platforms, connected to the station building by a footbridge. The station is unattended.

=== Platforms ===
north	■ Aoimori Railway Line	for Noheji, Misawa and Hachinohe
south	■ Aoimori Railway Line	for Aomori

== History ==
Koyanagi Station was opened on 1 November 1986 as a station on the Japan National Railways (JNR). With the privatization of the JNR on 1 April 1987, it came under the operational control of East Japan Railway Company (JR East). On 4 December 2010, the Tōhoku Shinkansen was successfully extended north to Shin-Aomori Station from Hachinohe. As a result of the opening of the bullet train between the two stations, that section of the Tōhoku Main Line including this station was transferred to the Aoimori Railway Company from JR East on the same day.

== Services ==
Koyanagi Station is primarily served by trains operating on a local service on the Aoimori Railway Line between Aomori and Hachinohe. It is served by one rapid express train, the 560M train operated jointly by the Aoimori Railway and the Iwate Galaxy Railway between Aomori and Morioka. Passenger trains serve Koyanagi Station just over 17 hours a day from 5:51 am to 11:42 pm. At peak hours between the first train and 9:37 am, trains depart from the station roughly every 30 minutes; otherwise trains depart at an approximate hourly basis. In 2018, a daily average of 1,085 passengers boarded trains at Koyanagi Station, an increase from the daily average of 559 passengers the station served in 2011, the first year of its operation on the Aoimori Railway Line. In 2018, the station was the seventh busiest on the Aoimori Railway Line, excluding Aomori and Hachinohe stations. It is the fourth busiest along the rail line in the city of Aomori.

=== Bus services ===
- Koyanagi-Danchi bus stop
  - Aomori City Bus
    - For Aomori Station via Oka-Tsukurimishi or Minami-Tsukuda
    - For Tōbu-Eigyōsho via Harabetsu

== See also ==
- List of railway stations in Japan
