= Nonai Station =

Railway station in Aomori, Aomori Prefecture, Japan

Nonai Station 野内駅
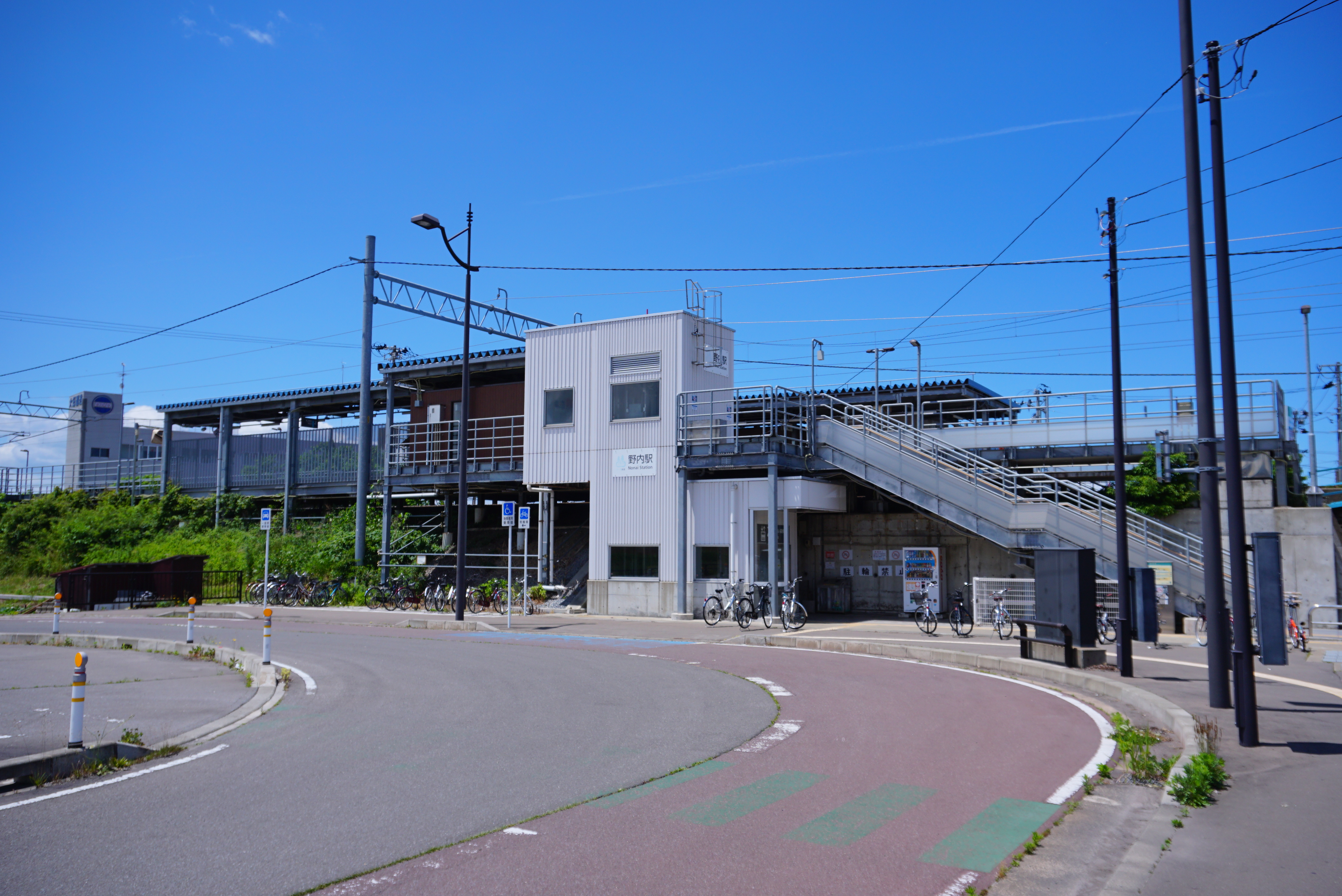
- Nonai Station in June 2020

General information
- Location: 34 Nonai Urashima, Aomori, Aomori Prefecture 039-3503; Japan
- Coordinates: 40°50′45.6″N 140°49′0.3″E
- System: Regional rail station
- Operator: Aoimori Railway
- Line: ■ Aoimori Railway Line
- Distance: 111.2 km from Metoki
- Platforms: 2 side platforms
- Tracks: 2

Other information
- Status: Unstaffed
- Website: Official website

History
- Opened: 16 July 1893

Passengers
- 1,086 daily boardings (2018)

Services
Preceding station	Aoimori Railway	Following station
Asamushi-Onsen towards Metoki	Aoimori Railway Line	Yadamae towards Aomori
Location
- Location within Aomori Prefecture Location within Japan

Nonai Station (野内駅, Nonai-eki) is a railway station on the Aoimori Railway Line in Nonai neighborhood of the city of Aomori in Aomori Prefecture, Japan, operated by the third-sector railway operator Aoimori Railway Company.

Passenger trains serve the station over 17 and a half hours a day; the departure time between trains is roughly 30 minutes during the morning peak with reduced frequency at other times. The station also serves as a bus station for Aomori City Bus and JR Bus Tōhoku, with local bus routes connecting the station to communities throughout the city of Aomori.

== Location ==
Nonai Station is served by the Aoimori Railway Line, and is 111.2 kilometers from the starting point of the line at Metoki Station. It is 728.5 kilometers from Tokyo.

== Station layout ==
Nonai Station has two opposed side platforms built on an embankment and connected by a pedestrian underpass. The station building is unattended.

=== Platforms ===
1	■ Aoimori Railway Line	for Noheji, Misawa and Hachinohe
2	■ Aoimori Railway Line	for Aomori

== History ==
Nonai Station was opened on 16 July 1893 as a station on the Nippon Railway in the former village of Nonai. It became a station on the Tōhoku Main Line of the Japanese Government Railways (JGR), the pre-war predecessor to the Japanese National Railways (JNR), after the nationalization of the Nippon Railway on 1 November 1906. With the privatization of JNR on 1 April 1987, the station came under the operational control of East Japan Railway Company (JR East).

The section of the Tōhoku Main Line including this station was transferred to Aoimori Railway on 4 December 2010. A new station building 1.5 kilometers southwest of the old one was completed in March 2011. The old station was demolished, but its sidings remain in place.

== Services ==
Nonai Station is primarily served by trains operating on a local service on the Aoimori Railway Line between Aomori and Hachinohe. It is served by one rapid express train, the 560M train operated jointly by the Aoimori Railway and the Iwate Galaxy Railway between Aomori and Morioka. Passenger trains serve the station for just over 17 and a half hours each day from 5:56 am to 11:37 pm. At peak hours between the first train and 9:39 am, trains depart from the station roughly every 30 minutes; otherwise trains depart at an approximate hourly basis. In 2018, a daily average of 1,086 passengers boarded trains at Nonai Station, an increase from the daily average of 578 passengers the station served in 2011, the final year of its operation in the station's original location. In 2018, the station was the sixth busiest on the Aoimori Railway Line, excluding Aomori and Hachinohe stations, and the fourth busiest along the line in the city of Aomori.

=== Bus services ===
- Aomori City Bus
  - For Aomori Station
  - For Asamushi-Onsen Station
- JR Bus Tōhoku
  - For Aomori Station
  - For Asamushi-Onsen Station

== See also ==
- List of railway stations in Japan
