= Higashi-Aomori Station =

Railway station in Aomori, Aomori Prefecture, Japan

Higashi-Aomori Station 東青森駅
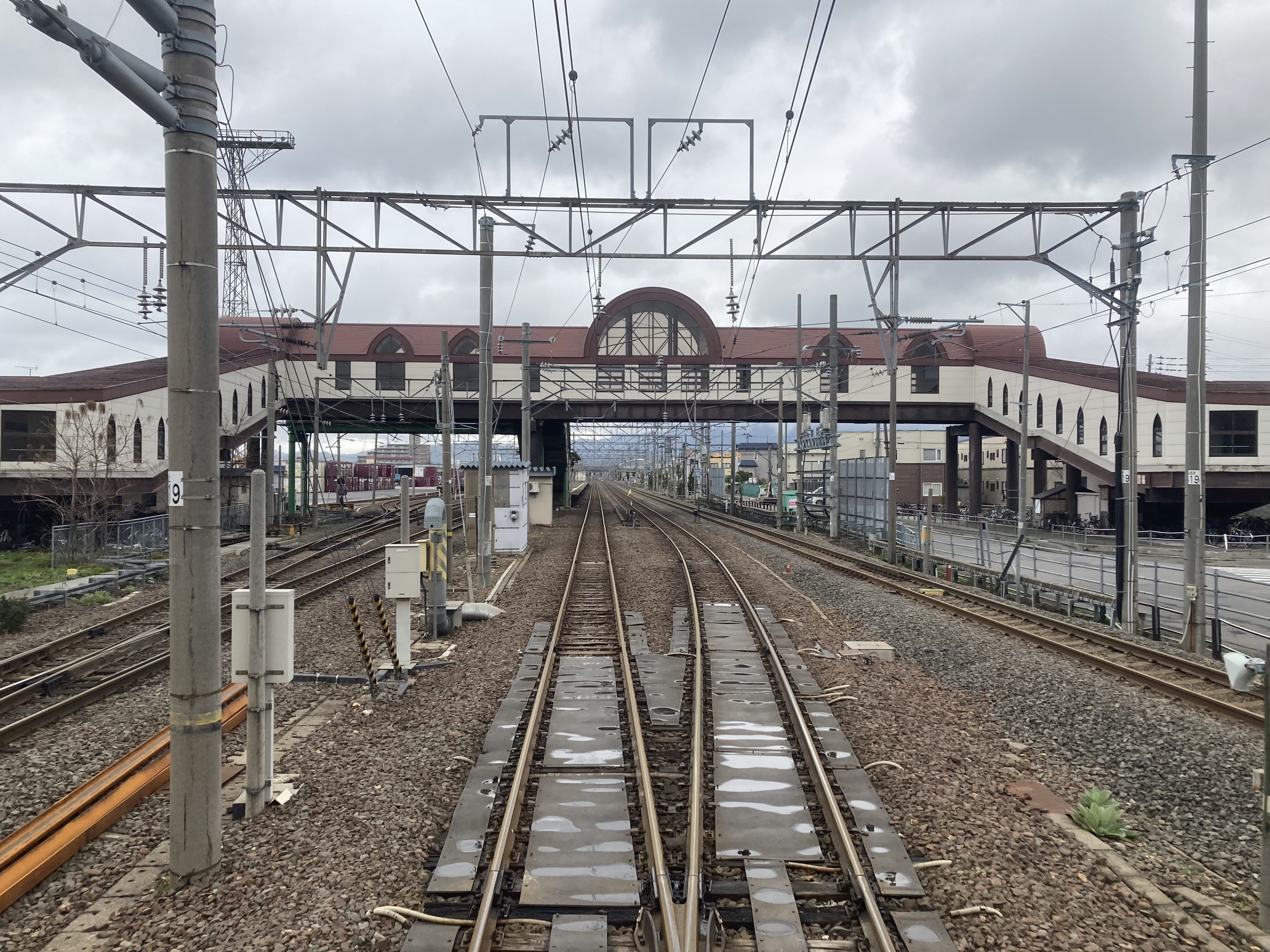
- Higashi-Aomori Station as seen from an Aomori-bound train

General information
- Location: 14-3 Furutachi, Aomori, Aomori Prefecture 030-0916; Japan
- Coordinates: 40°48′37.25″N 140°46′55.70″E
- System: Regional rail station
- Operator: Aoimori Railway; JR Freight
- Line: ■ Aoimori Railway Line
- Distance: 116.1 km from Metoki
- Platforms: 1 island platform

Other information
- Status: Unstaffed
- Website: Official website

History
- Opened: 21 July 1968

Passengers
- 1,338 daily boardings (2018)

Services
Preceding station	Aoimori Railway	Following station
Koyanagi towards Metoki	Aoimori Railway Line	Tsutsui towards Aomori
Location
- Location within Aomori Prefecture Location within Japan

Higashi-Aomori Station (東青森駅, Higashi-Aomori-eki) is a joint-use railway station located in the city of Aomori in Aomori Prefecture, Japan. The station is served by passenger services on the Aoimori Railway Line and freight services are operated by the Japan Freight Railway Company.

== Location ==
Higashi-Aomori Station is served by the 123.3 km Aoimori Railway Line between Metoki and Aomori. It is located between Koyanagi and Tsutsui stations, and lies 5.8 km from the terminus of the Aoimori Railway Line at Aomori.

== Station layout ==
The station has a single island platform. This is connected to an unattended station building by a footbridge.

=== Platforms ===
1	■ Aoimori Railway Line	for Hachinohe, Sannohe, and Metoki
2	■ Aoimori Railway Line	for Aomori

== History ==
Higashi-Aomori Station opened on 21 July 1968, as a station on the Japanese National Railways (JNR), when the Tōhoku Main Line was re-routed to the south of the downtown areas of the city. With the privatization of JNR on 1 April 1987, it came under the operational control of East Japan Railway Company (JR East). The section of the Tōhoku Main Line including this station was transferred to Aoimori Railway on 4 December 2010.

A large shopping complex was opened next to the station in November 2003.

== Services ==
For passengers, Higashi-Aomori Station is primarily served by trains operating on a local service on the Aoimori Railway Line between Aomori and Hachinohe. It is served by one rapid express train, the 560M train operated jointly by the Aoimori Railway and the Iwate Galaxy Railway between Aomori and Morioka. Passenger trains serve Higashi-Aomori Station just under 18 hours a day from 5:49 am to 11:45 pm. In 2018, a daily average of 1,338 passengers boarded trains at Higashi-Aomori Station, an increase from the daily average of 990 passengers the station served in 2011. In 2018, the station was the fourth busiest on the Aoimori Railway Line, excluding Aomori and Hachinohe stations, and the second busiest along the rail line in the city of Aomori.

== See also ==
- List of railway stations in Japan
