= Nonai, Aomori =

Nonai 野内村
- Former municipality
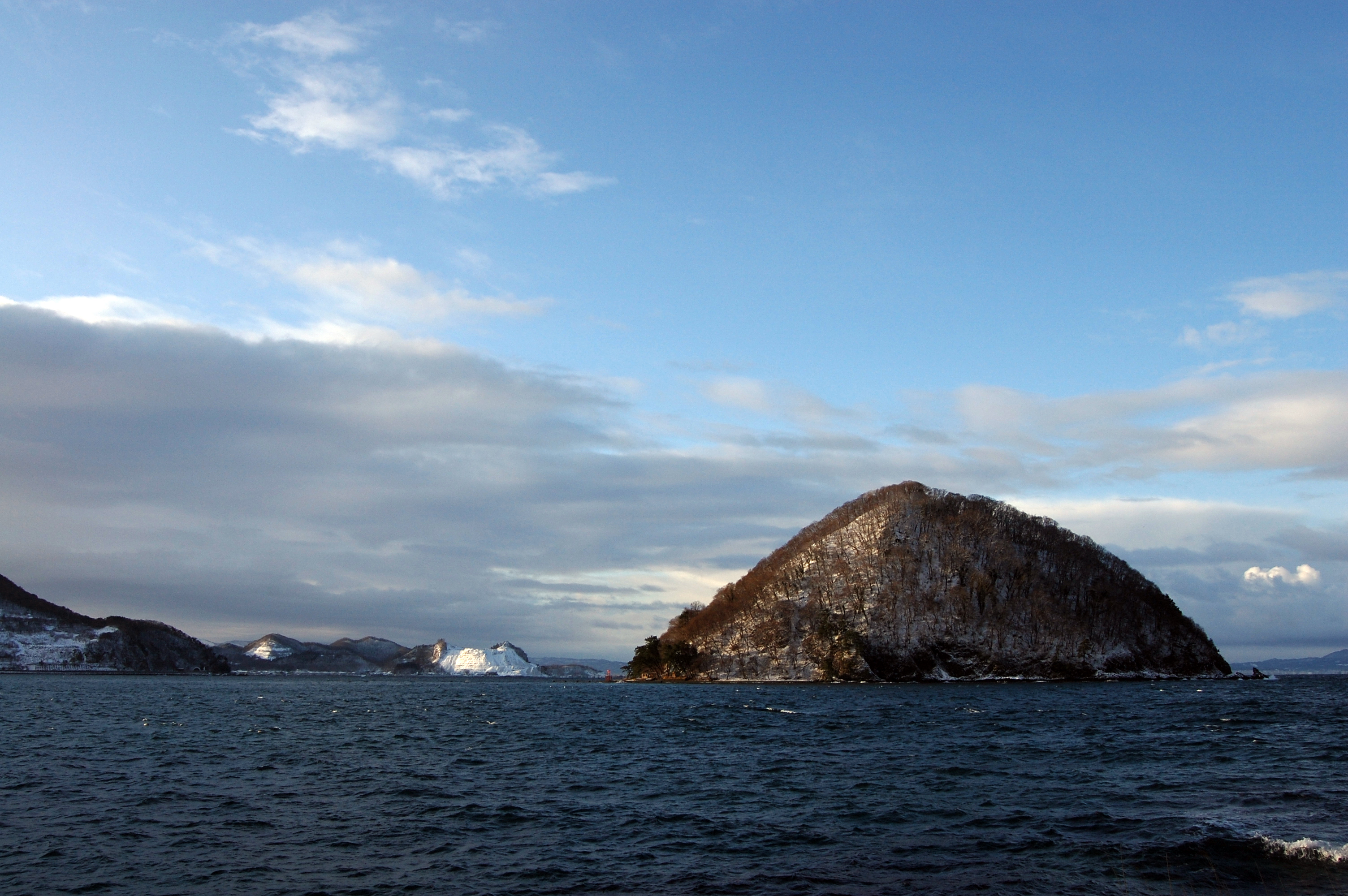
- Yunoshima and Nonai viewed from Asamushi Onsen

- Location in Japan
- Coordinates: 40°52′25.8″N 140°50′49.9″E
- Country: Japan
- Region: Tōhoku
- Prefecture: Aomori Prefecture
- District: Higashitsugaru
- Merged: October 1, 1962 (now part of Aomori)

Population (1960)
  - Total: 8,372
- Time zone: UTC+09:00 (JST)

Nonai (野内村, Nonai-mura) was a village located in Higashitsugaru District in central Aomori Prefecture, Japan. The former town was best known as a shukuba along the Matsumaedō and the site of an onsen town, Asamushi Onsen. It is now a neighborhood of the city, Aomori.

== History ==
Nonai was created by a merger of the villages of Asamushi and Kugurizaka on April 1, 1889. The village was annexed by Aomori on October 1, 1962.

== Neighbouring municipalities ==
These were the neighboring municipalities of Nonai just before its incorporation into Aomori.

- Aomori
- Hiranai

== Transportation ==
- Matsumaedō – a sub-route of the Ōshū Kaidō; today it exists roughly along National Route 4. The old route, signed as Aomori Prefecture Route 259, is still the main road through Nonai. Route 4 largely bypasses the neighborhood.
- Japan National Railways
  - Tōhoku Main Line – currently Aoimori Railway Line
    - Nonai Station – the station was moved 1.5 km to the southwest in 2011.
    - Asamushi-Onsen Station
- Aomori City Bus – the Aomori municipal bus is headquartered in Nonai.
