= Asamushi Aquarium =

Aquarium in Aomori, Aomori Prefecture, Japan

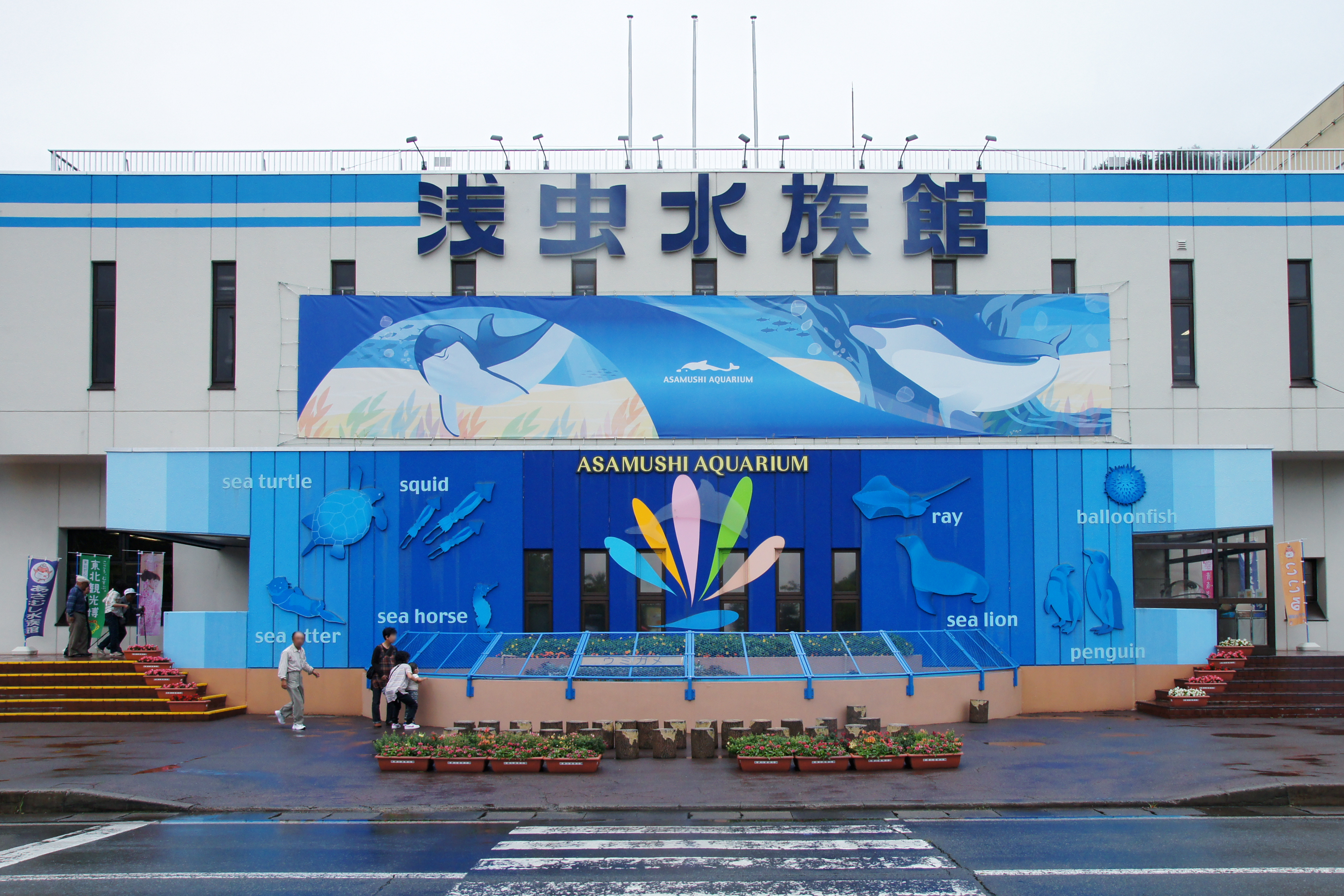
- Entrance of the aquarium
- Interactive map of Asamushi Aquarium
- 40°53′19.28″N 140°52′39.85″E
- Date opened: 1924 (Tohoku University); 23 July 1983 (Aomori prefectural government)
- Location: Aomori, Aomori Prefecture, Japan
- Land area: 4.8 ha (12 acres)
- Floor space: 8,813.11 square meters (94,863.5 sq ft)
- No. of animals: 11,000
- No. of species: 500
- Volume of largest tank: 390,000 litres (103,000 US gal) (oceanic tank)
- Total volume of tanks: 2,098,000 litres (554,000 US gal) (Total Facilities)
- Website: asamushi-aqua.com

Asamushi Aquarium (浅虫水族館, Asamushi Suizokukan) also called Aquarium Asamushi, is an aquarium in the Asamushi area of Aomori, Aomori Prefecture, Japan. Overlooking Mutsu Bay, it is the northernmost aquarium in Honshū. It keeps and displays 11,000 marine organisms, including those from Aomori Prefecture's abundant marine resources and over 500 species of rare aquatic animals from around the world.

== History ==
The Asamushi Aquarium was founded in 1922 by the Biology Department of the School of Sciences of Tōhoku Imperial University. The facilities were completely rebuilt in 1983 and have a total area of 8,813.11 square meters (94,863.5 sq ft). The aquarium is currently operated by the Aomori prefectural government.

== Exhibits ==
The warm and cold water exhibits at the aquarium (a total of 45 tanks containing 720 cubic metres (190,000 US gal) of water) feature marine animals such as sea otters, sea lions, seals, penguins, and dolphins. The dolphin show tank is the largest in the facility and holds 703 cubic metres (186,000 US gal). The seawater tank on the first floor includes a 15-metre (49 ft) acrylic tunnel for viewing the inhabitants from underneath.

First floor

- Amphibian display
- Seawater tank (tunnel tank)
- Warm water creatures (tropical tank)
- Marine life
- Cold water creatures
- Rare fresh water creatures
- Delfino gift shop

Second Floor

- Tropical rainforest display
- Environmental "touch tank"
- Dolphin show pool
- Dolphins

== Gallery ==
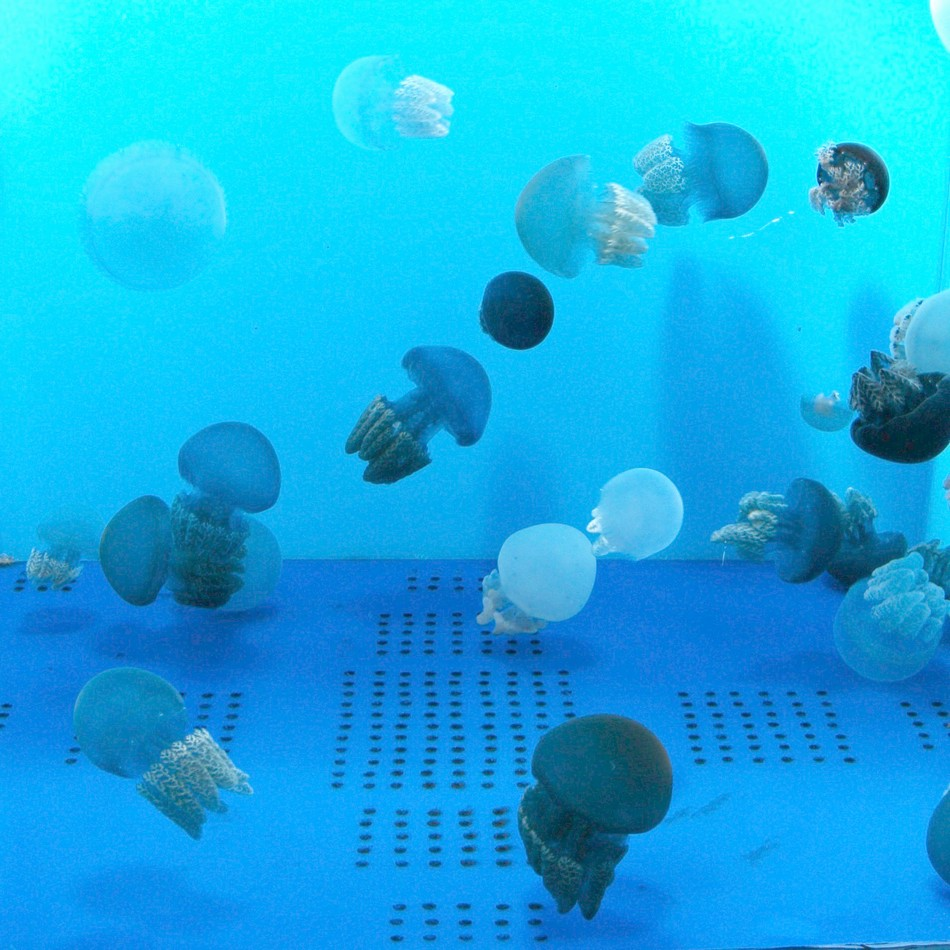

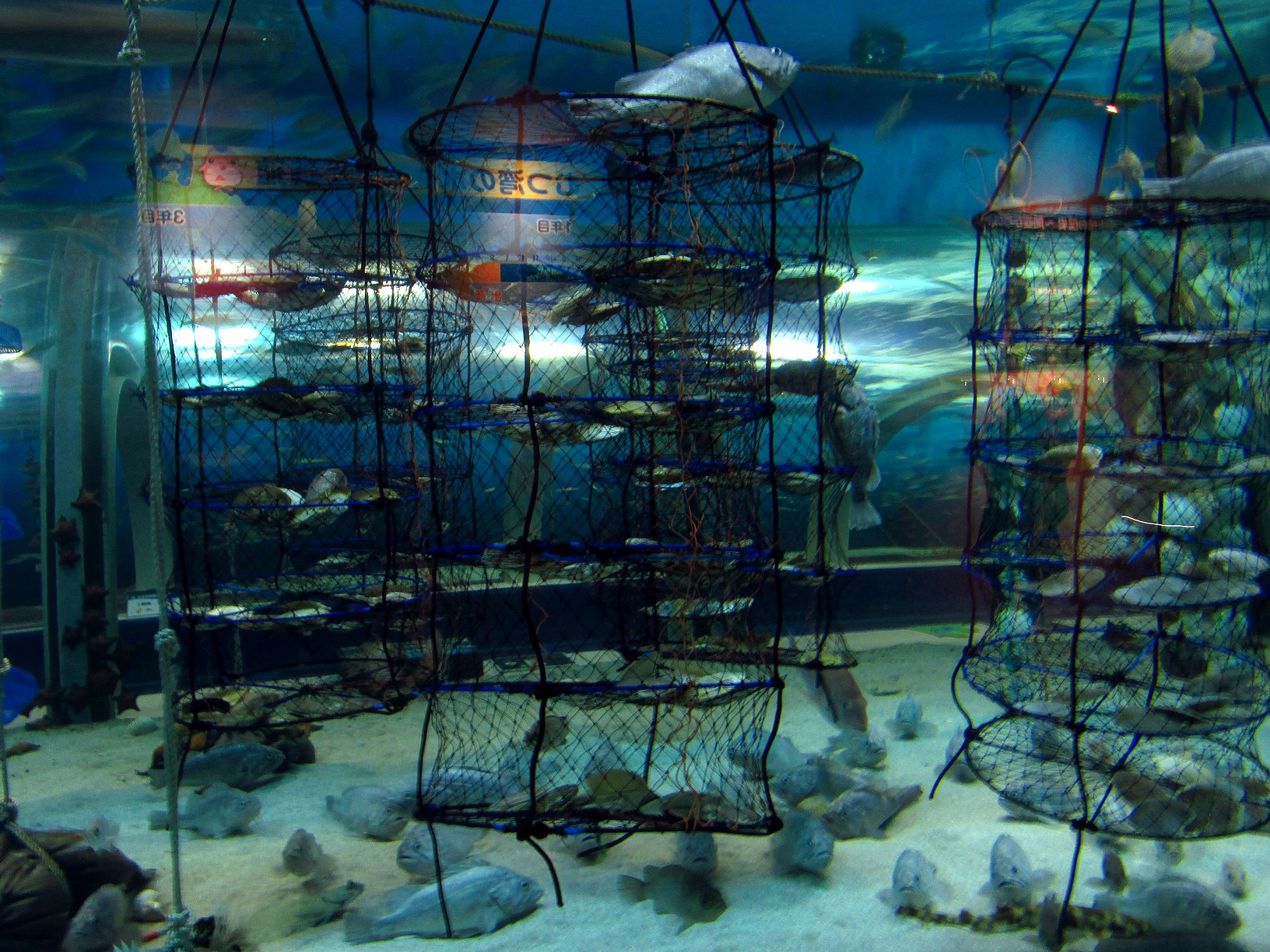

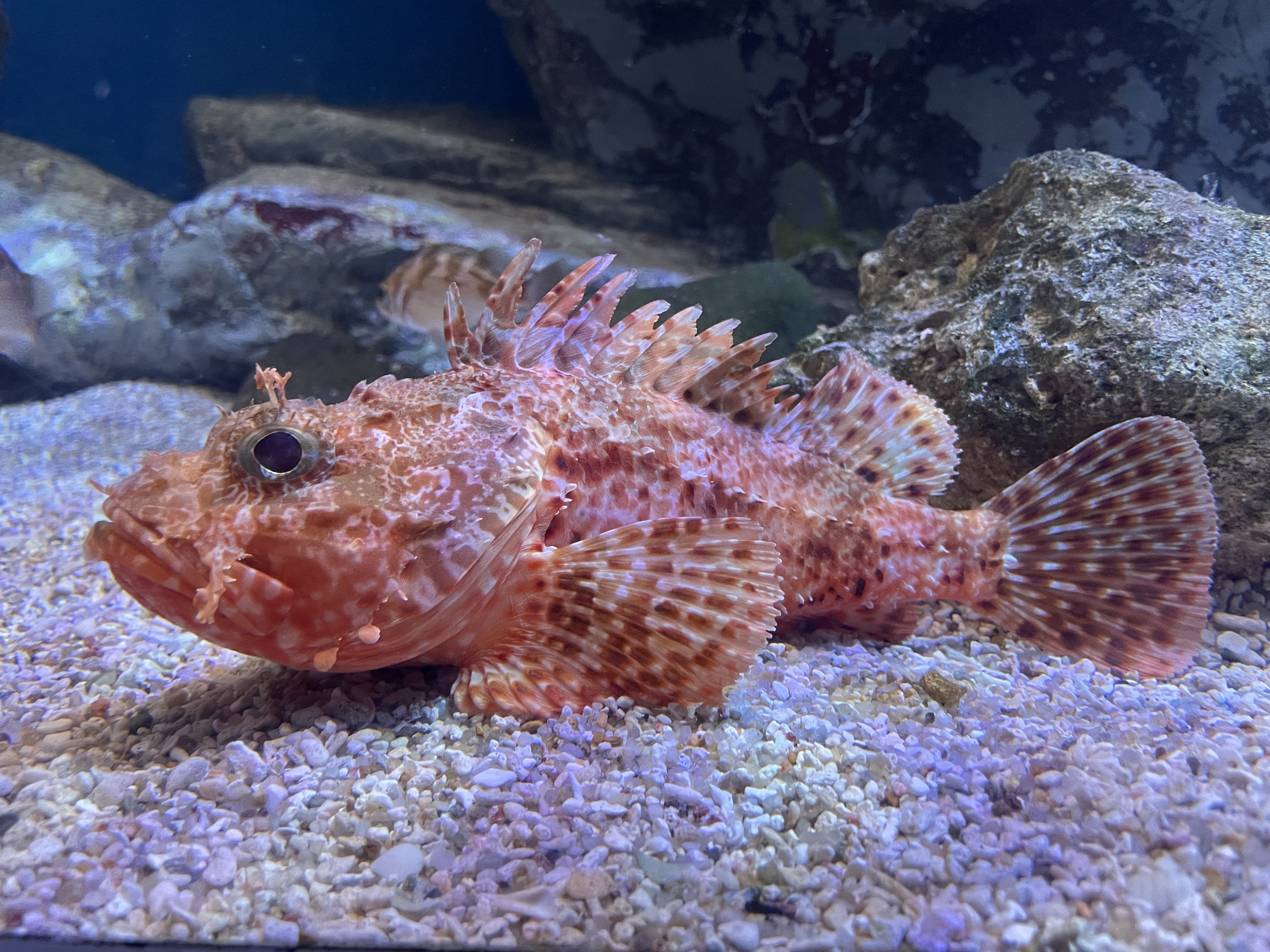

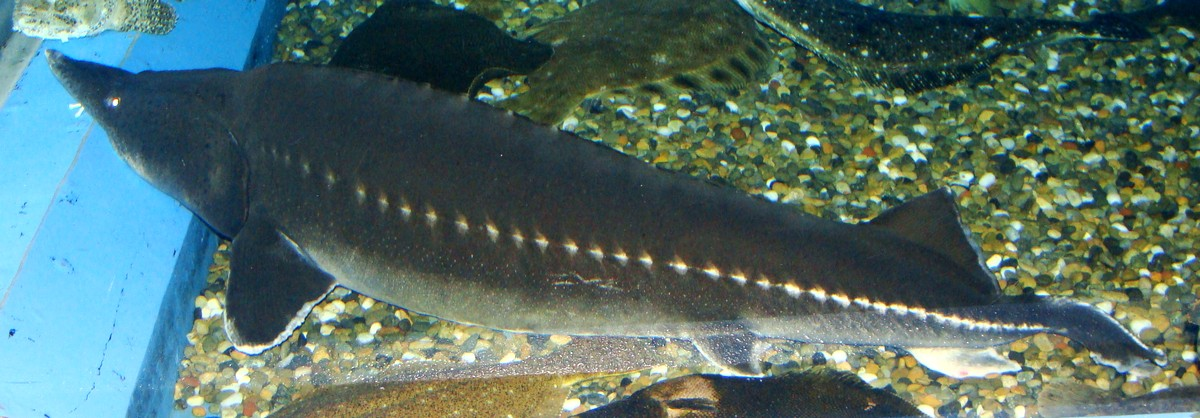
