= Aomori City Bus =

Bus service in Aomori, Japan

Aomori City Bus 青森市営バス
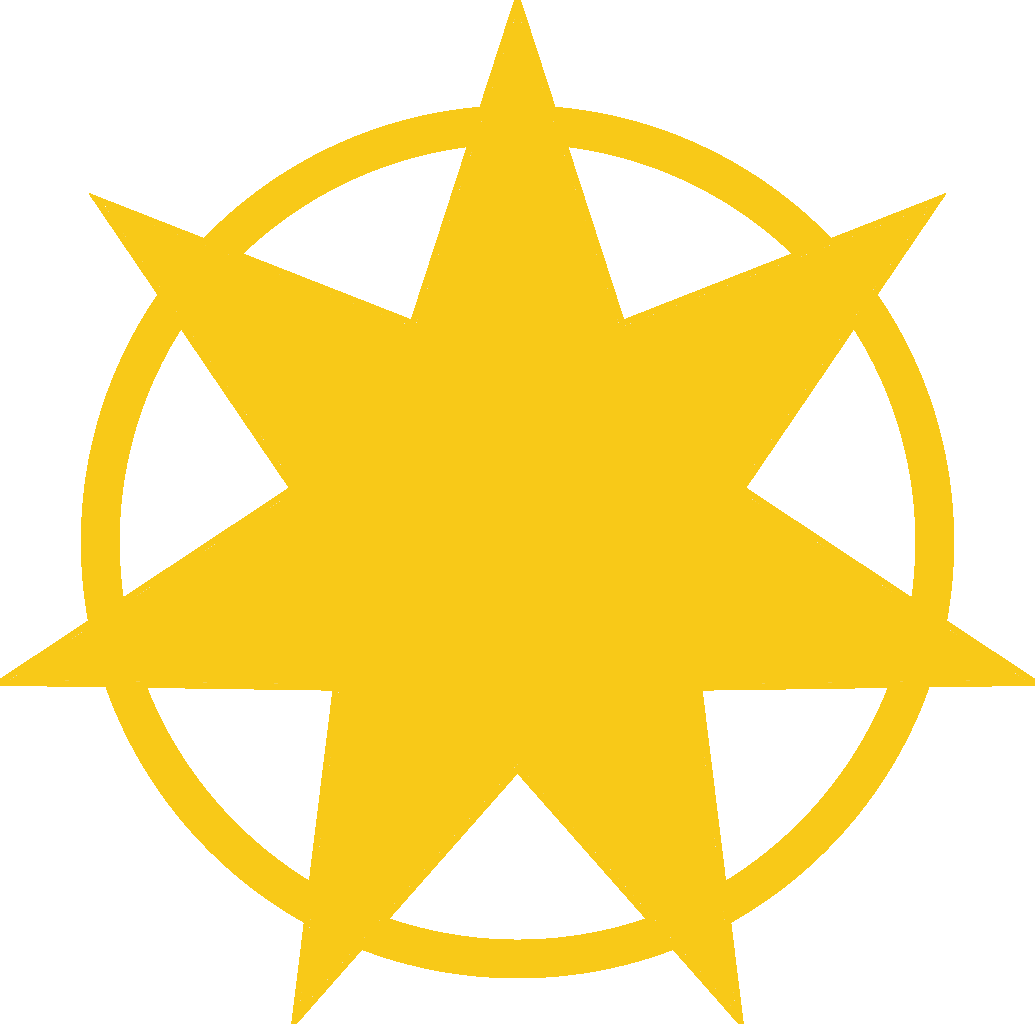
- Founded: 1924
- Headquarters: Kikukawa-47-1 Nonai, Aomori, Aomori 039-3503
- Service area: City of Aomori
- Service type: transit bus, tour bus service
- Routes: 14
- Stops: About 200
- Operator: Aomori (city) Transportation Division
- Website: https://www.city.aomori.aomori.jp/koutsu/top.html

Aomori City Bus (青森市営バス, Aomori-shiei Basu) is the bus public transit system in the city of Aomori in northern Japan.
