= Nanbu =

Nanbu may refer to:

== Places ==
- Nanbu, Aomori, Japan
- Nanbu, Tottori, Japan
- Nanbu, Yamanashi, Japan
- Nanbu County, Sichuan Province, China
- Nanbu Domain, a feudal domain in northeastern Japan

== People with the surname ==
- Nanbu Toshikatsu (南部 利雄, 1724–1780), Japanese samurai and daimyō
- Nanbu Toshimi (南部 利視, 1708–1752), Japanese samurai and daimyō
- Nanbu Toshitaka (南部 利敬, 1782–1820), Japanese samurai and daimyō
- Nanbu Torata (南部虎弾, 1951-2024), Japanese comedian and entertainer

== Other uses ==
- Nanbu clan

== See also ==
- Nambu (disambiguation)
