= Nanbu Toshimochi =

- 南部利用
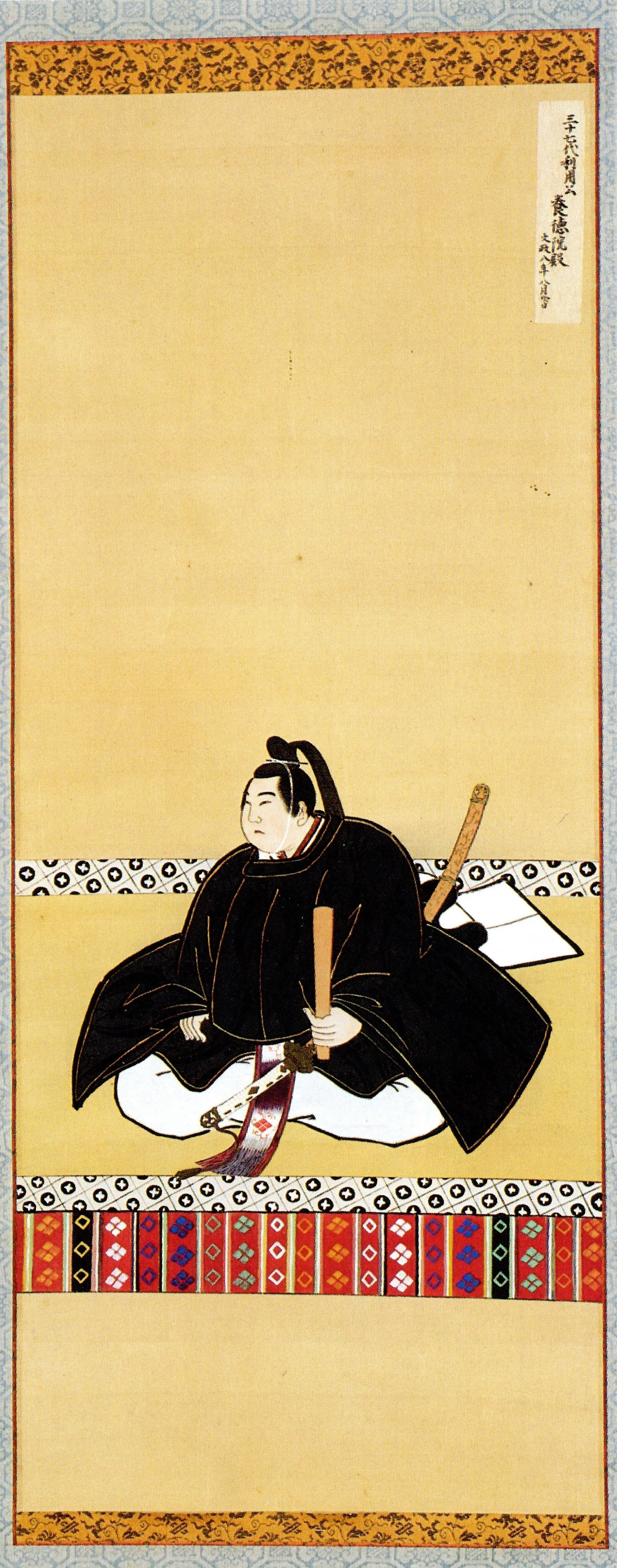
- Portrait of the second Nanbu Toshimochi
- Born: January 16, 1808 (Kijirō) and December 19, 1803 (Kitarō)
- Died: September 17, 1821 (aged 13) (Kijirō) and August 21, 1825 (aged 21) (Kitarō); Edo, Japan
- Title: Daimyō of Morioka Domain
- Predecessor: Nanbu Toshitaka
- Successor: Nanbu Toshitada
- Spouse(s): daughter of Maeda Narihiro, daimyō of Kaga Domain

Nanbu Toshimochi (南部利用) was the name of two mid-Edo period Japanese individuals who served as the 11th daimyō of Morioka Domain in northern Japan and the 37th hereditary chieftain of the Nanbu clan.

== Nanbu Toshimochi (Kijirō) ==
The first Toshimochi was born on 16 January 1808 as the eldest son of Nanbu Nobusuke, the brother of the 10th daimyō of Morioka, Nanbu Toshitaka. He was adopted as heir by Toshitaka, and became daimyō on his death in 1820. As he was still underage, domain affairs were managed by his uncle, Nanbu Nobuchika of Shichinohe Domain. Toshimochi was married to the daughter of Maeda Narihiro of Kaga Domain. However, on 17 September 1821 he died of injuries sustained after falling from a tree in his gardens. As this death occurred before even his first formal audience with the shōgun, the clan retainers were concerned that the Shogunate would use this as an excuse to reduce or abolish Morioka Domain, so the death was unreported. Toshimochi's cousin Kitarō, of similar age and appearance, was selected as his replacement.

== Nanbu Toshimochi (Kitarō) ==
The second Toshimochi was born in Morioka on 19 December 1803 as the third son of Nanbu Nobukiyo, a descendant of Nanbu Toshimi, the 7th daimyō of Morioka Domain. Shortly after the "real" Toshimochi died, he was renamed and brought to Edo to take his place, and was received in formal audience by shōgun Tokugawa Ienari on 15 November 1821. He was confirmed as daimyō of Morioka, and received the courtesy title of Daizen-no-taifu and junior 4th court rank, lower grade in December of the same year. He was also wed to the first Toshimochi's widow.

Due to his age and the circumstances of his accession, he was unable to quell the factionalism which plagued the domain's politics. The domain also had financial problems in meeting its obligations to the shogunate in Ezo territory. Furthermore, the Sōma Daisaku Incident, in which a former Nanbu samurai attempted to assassinate the daimyō of Hirosaki Domain, Tsugaru Yasuchika occurred in April 1821.

Fearing that the shogunate might demand his life over the incident, Toshimochi appointed Nanbu Toshitada as his heir. In 1825, he travelled to Edo due to illness, and died there at the age of 23. His only child was a daughter (later the wife of Nanbu Toshitomo), and per his will, Nanbu Toshitada became the next daimyo of Morioka.

== Notes ==
Preceded by Nanbu Toshitaka	11th (Nanbu) Daimyō of Morioka; 1820–1825	Succeeded by Nanbu Toshitada
