= Nanbu Toshimasa =

- 南部利正
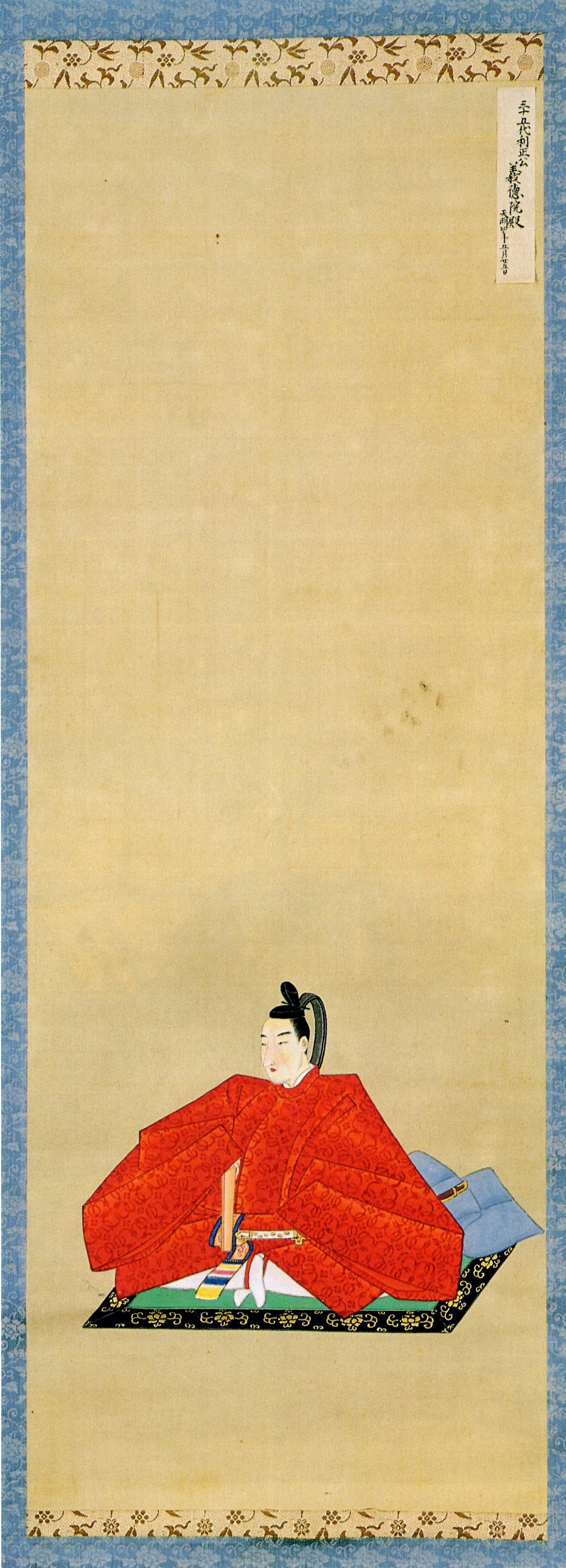
- Portrait of Nanbu Toshimasa
- Born: May 4, 1751
- Died: June 22, 1784 (aged 33)
- Title: Daimyō of Morioka Domain
- Predecessor: Nanbu Toshikatsu
- Successor: Nanbu Toshitaka
- Father: Nanbu Toshimi

Nanbu Toshimasa (南部利正; 4 May 1751 – 22 June 1784) was a mid-Edo period Japanese samurai, and the 9th daimyō of Morioka Domain in northern Japan. He was the 35th hereditary chieftain of the Nanbu clan. His courtesy title was Shuri-no-taifu, (later Daizen-no-taifu) and his Court rank was Junior 4th Rank, Lower Grade.

Toshikatsu was the sixth son of Nanbu Toshimi, the 7th daimyō of Morioka Domain, but was initially adopted by a 3000 koku hatamoto branch of the clan founded by a son of Nanbu Toshimoto, he was adopted as heir and was received in formal audience by shōgun Tokugawa Ieharu on 4 April 1770, and became head of his adopted family on 22 August 1773.

However, as the eldest (and only) son of the 8th daimyō, Nanbu Toshikatsu had been dispossessed he was recalled on 16 December 1774 to become Toshikatsu’s adopted heir, at which time the hatamoto branch was abolished.

On 22 December 1774 he was again received in audience by Tokugawa Ieharu, and he received the formal courtesy title of Shuri-no-taifu and Junior 5th court rank. He became daimyō on the death of his adopted father on 22 April 1781 and advanced to the courtesy title of Daizen-no-taifu.

However, he died three years later on 5 May 1784 at the age of 34, having made little impact on the domain during his tenure, and leaving an infant son as his heir.

Preceded by Nanbu Toshikatsu	9th (Nanbu) Daimyō of Morioka; 1780–1784	Succeeded by Nanbu Toshitaka
