= Shichinohe Castle =

Shichinohe Castle 七戸城
- Shichinohe, Aomori Prefecture, Japan
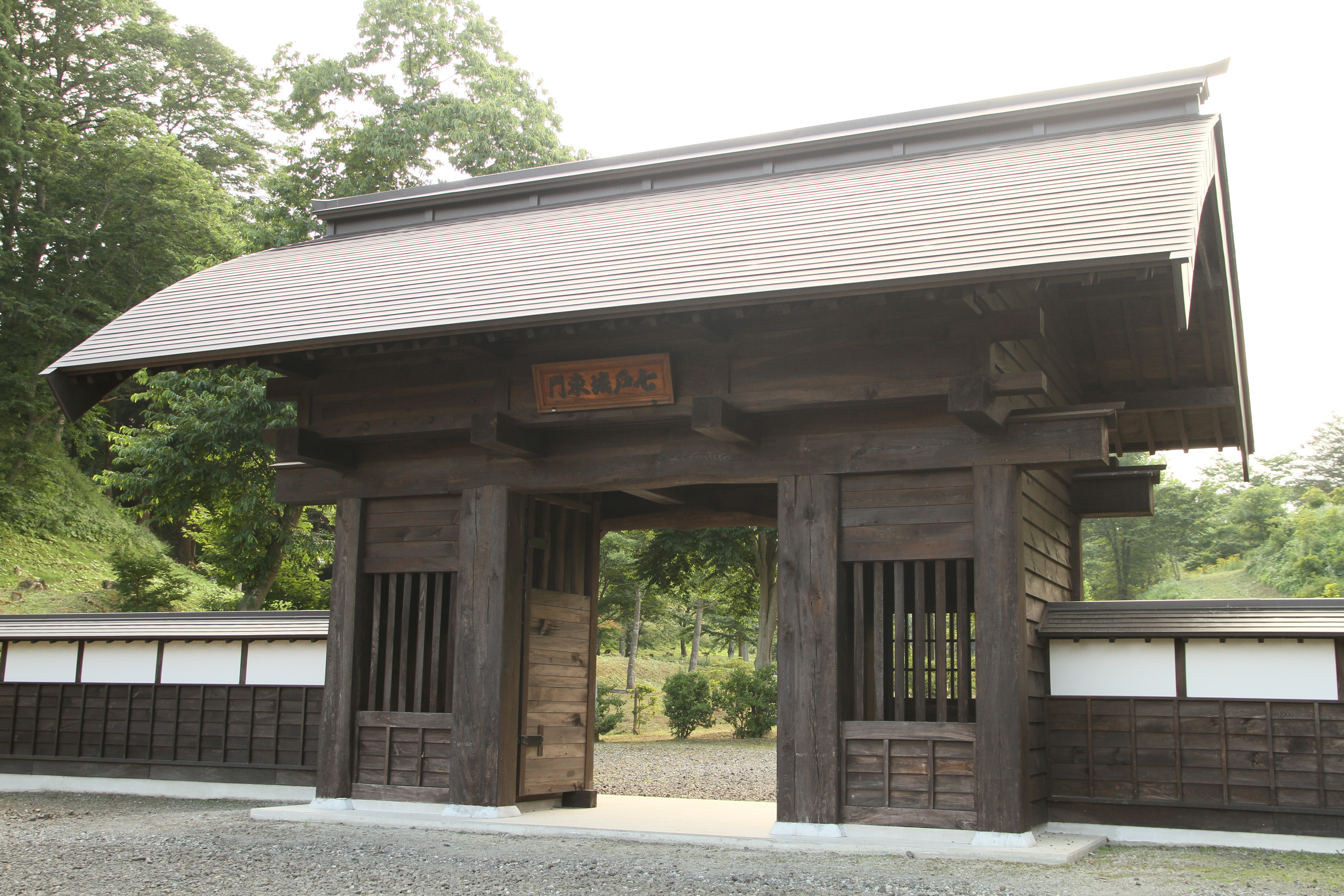
- Reconstructed east gate of Shichinohe Castle

Site information
- Type: hirayama-style Japanese castle
- Open to the public: yes
- Condition: ruins

Location
- Shichinohe Castle
- Location within Aomori Prefecture Location within Japan
- Coordinates: 40°41′53″N 141°08′56″E

Site history
- Built: Kamakura period
- Built by: unknown
- In use: Sengoku period
- Demolished: 1593

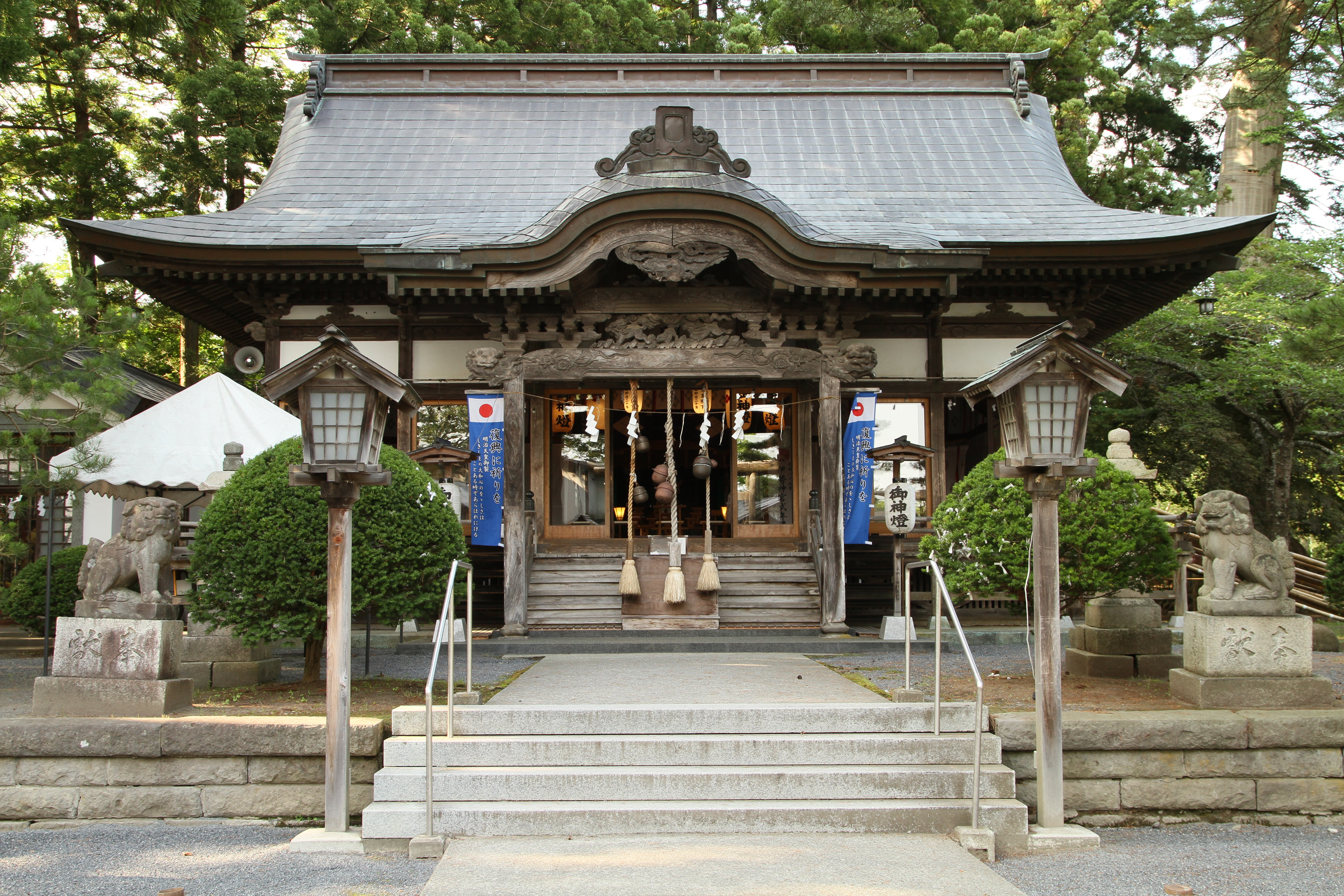
Shichinohe Shimmei-gū

Shichinohe Castle (七戸城, Shichinohe-jō) was a Japanese castle located in what is now the town of Shichinohe, in Kamikita District of Aomori Prefecture, in the Tōhoku region of far northern Japan. On December 13, 1941, the area was proclaimed a National Historic Site by the Japanese government.

== Overview ==
The date of the castle's foundation is unknown, with local legend attributing it to the Kamakura period general Kitabatake Akiie or to Nanbu clan ancestor Nanbu Masamitsu (d.1265) or Nanbu Masanaga (d. 1360). The Nanbu clan claimed descent from the Seiwa Genji of Kai Province. Minamoto no Yoshimitsu was awarded Kai Province following the Gosannen War, and his great-grandson Nobuyoshi took the surname Takeda. Another great-grandson, Mitsuyuki, took the name "Nanbu", after the location of his estates in Kai Province, which are now part of the town of Nanbu, Yamanashi. Nanbu Mitsuyuki joined Minamoto no Yoritomo at the Battle of Ishibashiyama and served in various mid-level positions within the Kamakura shogunate and is mentioned several times in the Azuma Kagami. He accompanied Yoritomo in the conquest of the Hiraizumi Fujiwara in 1189, and was awarded with vast estates in Nukanobu District the extreme northeast of Honshū, building Shōjujidate Castle.

Shichinohe was the location of a cadet branch of the Nanbu clan for several generations, and their fortified manor house was rebuilt extensively towards the end of the Sengoku period. The castle was a hirayama-style castle built on a 40-meter hilltop spreading northwest from a junction between the Sakuda and Wada rivers. It originally consisted of seven enclosures, each with earthen ramparts, and with several moats.

However, in 1591 the Shichinohe-branch of the Nanbu clan opposed the forces of Toyotomi Hideyoshi during the Kunohe Rebellion and were defeated. The castle was abandoned in 1592 and allowed to fall into ruins. The clan was allowed to survive as 2300 koku hatamoto under the main lineage of the Nanbu clan at Morioka Domain under the Tokugawa shogunate. Their revenues were increased to 5000 koku in 1694, and they were given charge of a daikansho erected on the site of their old castle in 1804. With a raise in revenues to 11,000 koku in 1819, Shichinohe Domain was created. In 1858, the daimyō of Shichinohe, Nanbu Nobunori was raised to the status of castellan and granted formal permission to rebuild Shichinohe Castle as part of Japan's increased defensive preparations again possible foreign incursions in light of the recent Perry Expedition. However, the Meiji restoration occurred before any construction could begin, and in 1873, the Shichinohe jin'ya was also abandoned.

Only scattered stone and earthen ramparts, and a small portion of an inner moat remain. A wooden reconstruction of one gate marks the entrance to the site, which is now a local city park. A Shinto shrine, the Shichinohe Shimmei-gū is now located on the site of the main bailey.

In 1996, excavations in the sites of the main and second bailey uncovered relics from the 15th century.

== See also ==
- List of Historic Sites of Japan (Aomori)

== Literature ==
- De Lange, William (2021). An Encyclopedia of Japanese Castles. Groningen: Toyo Press. pp. 600 pages. ISBN 978-9492722300.
- Schmorleitz, Morton S. (1974). Castles in Japan. Tokyo: Charles E. Tuttle Co. pp. 144–145. ISBN 0-8048-1102-4.
- Motoo, Hinago (1986). Japanese Castles. Tokyo: Kodansha. p. 200 pages. ISBN 0-87011-766-1.
- Mitchelhill, Jennifer (2004). Castles of the Samurai: Power and Beauty. Tokyo: Kodansha. p. 112 pages. ISBN 4-7700-2954-3.
- Turnbull, Stephen (2003). Japanese Castles 1540-1640. Osprey Publishing. p. 64 pages. ISBN 1-84176-429-9.
