= Nanbu Toshitada =

Japanese samurai (1797–1855)

- 南部利済
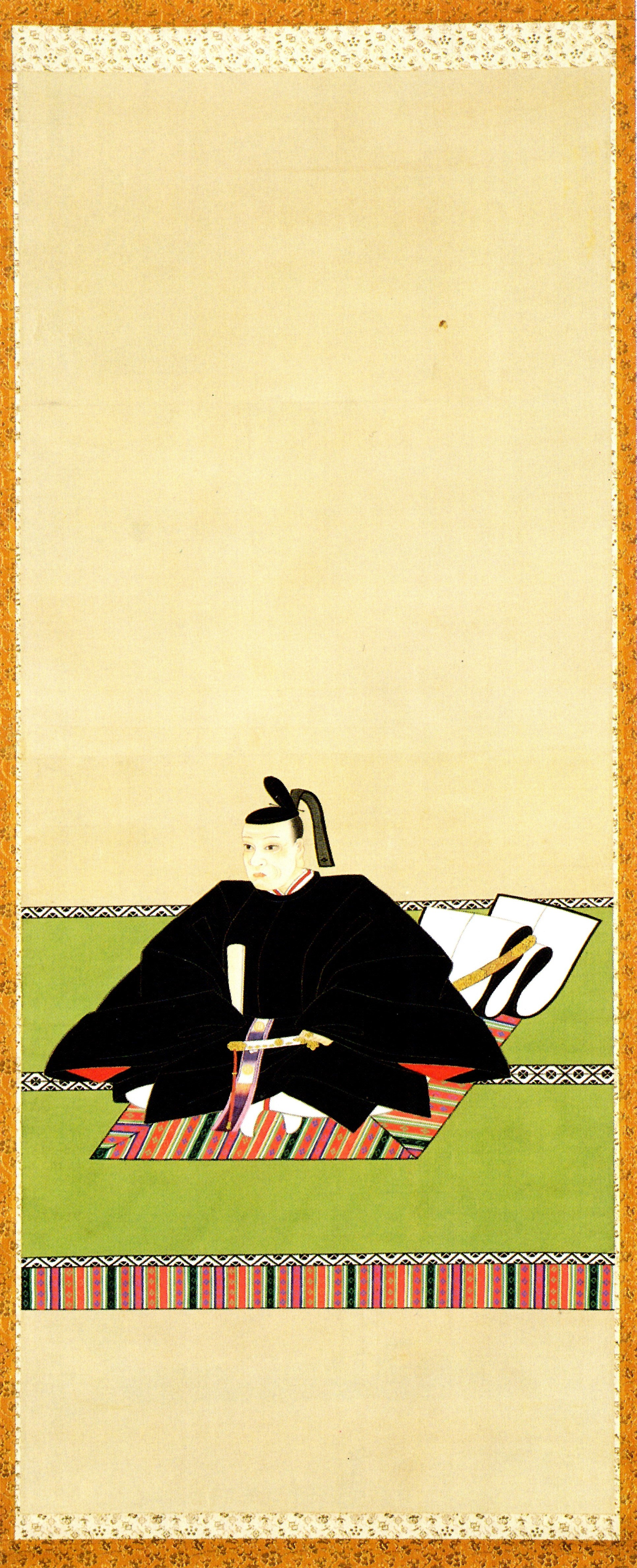
- Portrait of Nanbu Toshitada at Sendai City Museum

12th Daimyō of Morioka Domain
- In office 1825–1847
- Monarchs: Shōgun: Tokugawa Ienari; Tokugawa Ieyoshi
- Preceded by: Nanbu Toshimochi
- Succeeded by: Nanbu Toshitomo

Personal details
- Born: October 18, 1797 Morioka, Japan
- Died: May 29, 1855 (aged 57) Edo, Japan
- Spouse(s): daughter of Matsudaira Terunobu, daimyō of Takasaki Domain
- Parent: Nanbu Toshinori (father)

Nanbu Toshitada (南部利済; 18 October 1797 – 29 May 1855) was a late Edo period Japanese samurai and the 12th daimyō of Morioka Domain in northern Japan. He was the 38th hereditary chieftain of the Nanbu clan. His courtesy title was Shinano-no-kami (later Sashōshō), and his Court rank was Junior 4th Rank, Lower Grade.

== Biography ==
Toshitada was the second son of the disinherited Nanbu Toshinori, the eldest son of the 8th daimyō of Morioka, Nanbu Toshikatsu. His mother was a commoner and a widow, and there were later allegations that he may not have been of Nanbu blood at all. In any event, on the death of his father in 1814, he went into the Jōdo Shinshū Buddhist priesthood. He returned to secular life in 1820 by order of the domain government and served as advisor to the young Nanbu Toshimochi, who subsequently appointed him as heir. Toshimochi was of poor health and died in 1825, so in accordance with his wishes, Toshitada became daimyō of Morioka. He was received in formal audience by Shōgun Tokugawa Ienari who awarded him with the courtesy title of Shinano-no-kami and junior 4th court rank, lower grade. In 1827, he was promoted to the honorary title of Jijū (Chamberlain).

Toshitada implemented a wide range of fiscal improvements, sponsored new industries and took steps to improve the domain's military forces. His quick actions and the poor state of the domain's finances caused much disaffection among his retainers and also led to a peasant revolt in 1836.

In 1839, he was promoted to the higher courtesy title of Sashōshō and in 1841 opened a han school. However, the domain erupted into widespread revolt against his rule in 1847. In 1848, he stepped down in favor of his son Nanbu Toshitomo; however, relations between father and son were very strained at best, and Toshitada continued to intervene and interfere in domain politics after his retirement. He then forced his son aside in 1848, making Toshitomo's younger brother Nanbu Toshihisa nominal daimyō while he continued to rule in all but name. This led to another widespread revolt in 1854, which caused the Tokugawa shogunate to intervene. He was placed under house arrest at the clan's Edo shimoyashiki, where he died a few months later on 29 May 1855.

== Family ==
- Father: Nanbu Toshinori
- Mother: Oyone no Kata (Seikan-in)
- Wife: Masako, adopted daughter of Nanbu Toshitaka, daughter of Matsudaira Terunobu of Takasaki Domain
- Concubine: Retsuko (from the Narayama clan)
  - 1st son; Nanbu Toshitomo, daimyō of Morioka
  - 3rd son: Nanbu Toshihisa, daimyō of Morioka
