= Toshifumi =

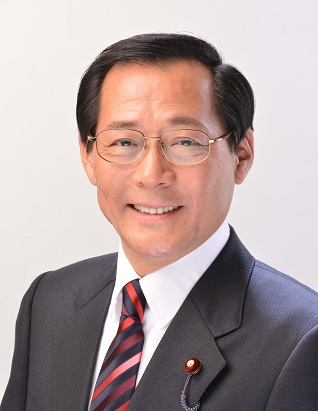
- Toshifumi Kojima, Japanese politician
- Pronunciation: toɕiɸɯmi (IPA)
- Gender: Male

Origin
- Origin: Japanese
- Meaning: Different meanings depending on the kanji used

Other names
- Alternative spelling: Tosihumi (Kunrei-shiki) Tosihumi (Nihon-shiki) Toshifumi (Hepburn)

Toshifumi is a masculine Japanese given name.

== Written forms ==
Toshifumi can be written using different combinations of kanji characters. Some examples:

- 敏文, "agile, literature"
- 敏史, "agile, history"
- 敏郁, "agile, aroma/progress"
- 俊文, "talented, literature"
- 俊史, "talented, history"
- 俊郁, "talented, aroma/progress"
- 利文, "benefit, literature"
- 利史, "benefit, history"
- 利郁, "benefit, aroma/progress"
- 年文, "year, literature"
- 年史, "year, history"
- 寿文, "long life, literature"
- 寿史, "long life, history"

The name can also be written in hiragana としふみ or katakana トシフミ.

== Notable people with the name ==
- Toshifumi Baba (馬場 敏史; born 1965), Japanese baseball player.
- Toshifumi Kojima (小島 敏文; born 1950), Japanese politician.
- Toshifumi Nanbu (南部 利文; born 1970), CEO of the Orix Ceramic Limited Company.
- Toshifumi Suzuki (鈴木 敏文; 1932–2026), Japanese chief executive.
- Toshifumi Takeshima (竹島 知郁; born 1986), Japanese television announcer.
- Toshifumi Yokota (横田 俊文), Japanese medical scientist and professor of medical genetics.
- Toshifumi Ohkusa, Japanese academic and author.
