= Toshifumi Nanbu =

Japanese businessperson

Toshifumi Nanbu (南部 利文, Nanbu Toshifumi; born April 8, 1970) is the 46th head of the Nanbu clan from Morioka Domain, descendant of Emperor Go-Yōzei, and statutory auditor of the Tohoku Bank.

He is CEO of the Orix Ceramic Limited Company yūgen gaisha established by his grandfather, a director of Iwate Nippon Keidanren, and President of the Iwate Scout Council, and also serves in a key position of various groups within Iwate prefecture.

== Ancestry ==
Ancestors of Toshifumi Nanbu

16. Marquess Shijō Takauta (1828-1898)
8. Prince Ichijō Saneteru (1866-1924)
17. Okudaira (d. 1880)
4. Count Nanbu Toshihide (1907-1980)
18. Marquess Hosokawa Morihisa (1839-1893)
9. Lady Hosokawa Etsuko (1877-1945)
19. Nabeshima Hiroko (1851-1919)
2. Nanbu Toshihisa (1932-1980)
20. Count Nanbu Toshiyuki, 14th Lord of Morioka (1855-1903)
10. Count Nanbu Toshiatsu (1884-1930)
21. Asano Kikuko (1856-1902)
5. Lady Mizuko Nanbu (1908-1980)
22. Marquess Ikeda Terumoto (1852-1890)
11. Lady Ikeda Kibiko (1885-1944)
23. Nabeshima Sachiko (1861-1927)
1. Nanbu Toshifumi
6. Nodama Yoshio
3. Nodama Kayoko (b. 1940)
7. NN
