= Nanbu Toshitomo =

- 南部利義
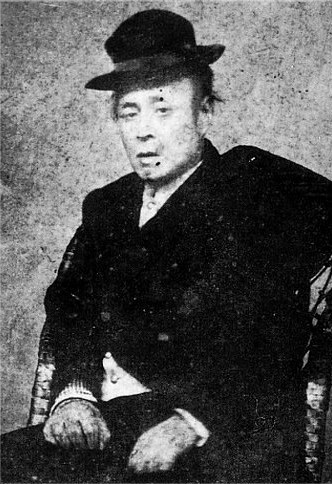
- Nanbu Toshitomo, post-Meiji restoration

13th Daimyō of Morioka Domain
- In office 1847–1848
- Monarch: Shōgun: Tokugawa Ieyoshi
- Preceded by: Nanbu Toshitada
- Succeeded by: Nanbu Toshiyuki

Personal details
- Born: January 12, 1824; Morioka, Japan
- Died: August 21, 1888 (aged 64); Tokyo, Japan
- Spouse(s): Toshiko, daughter of Ii Naoaki, daimyō of Hikone Domain
- Parent: Nanbu Toshitada (father)

Nanbu Toshitomo (南部利義, 12 January 1824 – 21 August 1888) was the 13th daimyō of Morioka Domain in northern Japan and the 39th hereditary chieftain of the Nanbu clan.

== Biography ==
Toshitomo was born as Nanbu Noriyasu (南部謹保), the eldest son of the 12th daimyō of Morioka, Nanbu Toshitada. In 1835, he was received in formal audience by Shōgun Tokugawa Ienari and was subsequently conferred with the courtesy title of Kai-no-kami, and Court rank of Junior 4th Rank, Lower Grade, and his name was changed to Nanbu Nobutomo (南部信侯).

After widespread peasant revolts occurred in Morioka Domain in 1836 and 1847, largely in protest to economic policies and food shortages, Toshitada went into voluntary retirement, and Toshitomo nominally became the new daimyō. However, Toshitomo was ordered to remain at the domain residence in Edo instead of making the usual sankin-kōtai journey to Morioka, and the domain continued to be administered by the karō and other influential samurai who answered only to his father. After around a year, sentiment against Toshitada had died down somewhat in Morioka, so Toshitomo was forced into retirement, and replaced by his more pliable younger brother Nanbu Toshihisa.

Toshitomo was very angry with this situation, especially as the policies which had resulted in widespread revolts were continued, and the samurai of the domain split into factions supporting either the son or the father. Relations between the two were so bad that at one point a retainer of Toshitada attempted to kill Toshitomo by poisoning. In 1849, he changed his name to Nanbu Toshimichi (南部利道).

As Toshitomo had predicted, another widespread revolt occurred in the Nanbu domains against Toshitada in 1853. The situation was so dire that the Tokugawa shogunate was forced to intervene directly. The rōjū Abe Masahiro placed Toshitada under house arrest, where he died a year later. However, Toshitomo was also found culpable of inciting the insurrection, and was confined to a single room within this own house. The same year, he changed his name once again, this time to Nanbu Toshitomo.

Toshitomo remained in Edo through the remainder of the Bakumatsu period, and only visited Morioka as a private citizen after the Meiji Restoration.
