= Nanbu Toshimoto =

Mid-Edo Japanese samurai (1689–1725)

- 南部利幹
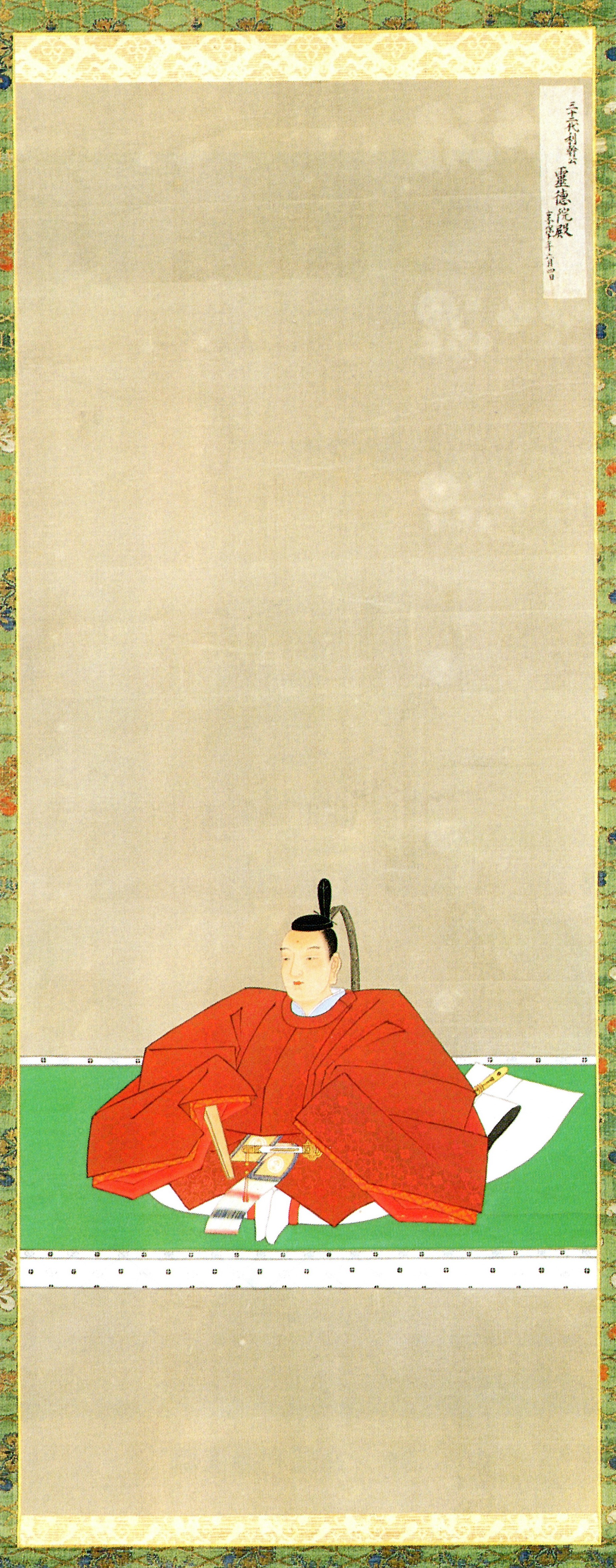
- Nanbu Toshimoto
- Born: March 11, 1689
- Died: July 13, 1725 (aged 36)
- Title: Daimyō of Morioka Domain
- Predecessor: Nanbu Nobuoki
- Successor: Nanbu Toshimi
- Spouse(s): daughter of Hachisuka Takashige, daimyō of Tokushima Domain
- Father: Nanbu Yukinobu

Nanbu Toshimoto (南部利幹; 11 March 1689 – 13 July 1725) was a mid-Edo period Japanese samurai, and the 6th daimyō of Morioka Domain in northern Japan. He was the 32nd hereditary chieftain of the Nanbu clan. His courtesy title was Bingo-no-kami, (later Daizen-no-suke) and his Court rank was Junior Fifth Rank, Lower Grade.

Toshimoto was the 4th son of Nanbu Yukinobu, the 4th daimyō of Morioka Domain. He was initially adopted into the Sannohe branch of the Nanbu clan, but was posthumously adopted on the death of his brother Nanbu Nobuoki on 5 January 1706 to become daimyō of Morioka. He was received in formal audience by shōgun Tokugawa Tsunayoshi on 15 January.

At this time the domain was suffering from severe financial difficulties due to reduced production from its copper mines and was deeply in debt, so much so that expenses for the mandatory sankin-kōtai procession could not be met. In 1723, he took the drastic and highly unpopular step of reducing the number of retainers. Before his death, he adopted the posthumous son of Nanbu Nobuoki as his heir to restore the direct line of succession, and demoted his own son to hatamoto status. He died in 1725.

Preceded by Nanbu Nobuoki	6th (Nanbu) Daimyō of Morioka; 1705–1725	Succeeded by Nanbu Toshimi
