= Mitsuyuki =

- Gender: Male

Origin
- Origin: Japanese
- Meaning: Different meanings depending on the kanji used

Mitsuyuki (written: 光行, 光幸 or 充志) is a masculine Japanese given name. Notable people with the name include:

- Mitsuyuki Funamizu (船水 光行) (born 1933), Japanese fencer
- Mitsuyuki Masuhara (増原 光幸) (born 1973), Japanese anime director
- Minamoto no Mitsuyuki (源 光行) (1163–1244), Japanese governor
- Mitsuyuki Yoshihiro (吉弘 充志) (born 1985), Japanese footballer
