= Textual tradition of The Tale of Genji =

The Tale of Genji is one of the best-known works of classical Japanese literature, and the number of manuscript copies of it is very large. It was originally written by Murasaki Shikibu, a lady-in-waiting at the Heian court, at the beginning of the eleventh century, but the earliest extant manuscript was copied by Fujiwara no Teika roughly two centuries later.

== Overview ==
The Tale of Genji was copied extensively in the pre-modern era. The scholar Kikan Ikeda once performed an extensive study of 300 manuscript copies of the work, and even counting only manuscripts copied before the end of the Muromachi period in the mid-16th century the number comes to roughly 100.

The earliest of these surviving copies, dating from the early Kamakura period, are the Aobyōshi-bon produced by Fujiwara no Teika and the Kawachi-bon produced by Minamoto no Mitsuyuki and his son Chikayuki (ja).

== Early copying ==
Murasaki's diary records that by the winter of 1008 Genji was already in circulation, and so must have already begun to be copied and distributed at this time. Because of the circumstances of copying of monogatari literature, which were treated as light entertainments for court ladies, numerous errors crept into these early copies, and as those copies were copied the errors multiplied exponentially. Entire chapters began to be added to the work, coming to around 60 chapters rather than the 54 that became the standard.

=== Kamakura editors ===
Fujiwara no Teika, according to his diary the Meigetsuki, was robbed on the 16th day of the second month of 1225, and his copy of Genji was one of the items that were stolen. Teika had apparently been working on editing a "true version" of Genji (possibly the surviving Aobyōshi-bon) since the eleventh month of the previous year, but in his diary he bemoaned the many variations between the various manuscripts in circulation. (Note: 尋求所々、雖見合諸本、猶狼藉未散不審)

Chikayuki, who began his editing of the Kawachi-bon in 1236, similarly wrote of the variations between the manuscripts he had available to him.

=== Lost manuscripts ===
The texts that were available to the early Kamakura editors may have included:

- the Nijō no Sochi Korefusa-bon (二条帥伊房本);
- the Reizei no Chūnagon Tomotaka-bon (冷泉中納言朝隆本);
- the Horikawa no Sadaijin Toshifusa-bon (堀川左大臣俊房本);
- the Ju-Ichi-i Reishi-hon;
- the Hosshōji Kanpaku-bon (法性寺関白本);
- the Gojō no Sanmi Shunzei-bon (五条三位俊成本);
- the Kyōgoku no Chūnagon Teika-bon (京極中納言定家本);

and at least thirteen other manuscripts whose names are known, as well one copy that was supposedly produced by Fujiwara no Yukinari.

== Works cited ==
- Akiyama, Ken; Abe, Akio; Shinohara, Shōji (1983). "Genji Monogatari". Nihon Koten Bungaku Daijiten 日本古典文学大辞典 (in Japanese). Vol. 2. Tokyo: Iwanami Shoten. pp. 406–437. OCLC 11917421.
