= Toshimi =

- Gender: Male

Origin
- Origin: Japanese
- Meaning: Different meanings depending on the kanji used

Toshimi (written: 利三, 利視 or 俊美) is a masculine Japanese given name. Notable people with the name include:

- Toshimi Kikuchi (菊池 利三; born 1973), Japanese footballer
- Toshimi Kitazawa (北澤 俊美; born 1938), Japanese politician
- Nanbu Toshimi (南部 利視; 1708–1752), Japanese samurai and daimyō
- Toshimi Tagawa, Japanese Enka singer
