= Nanbu Nobuoki =

Mid-Edo Japanese Samurai

- 南部信恩
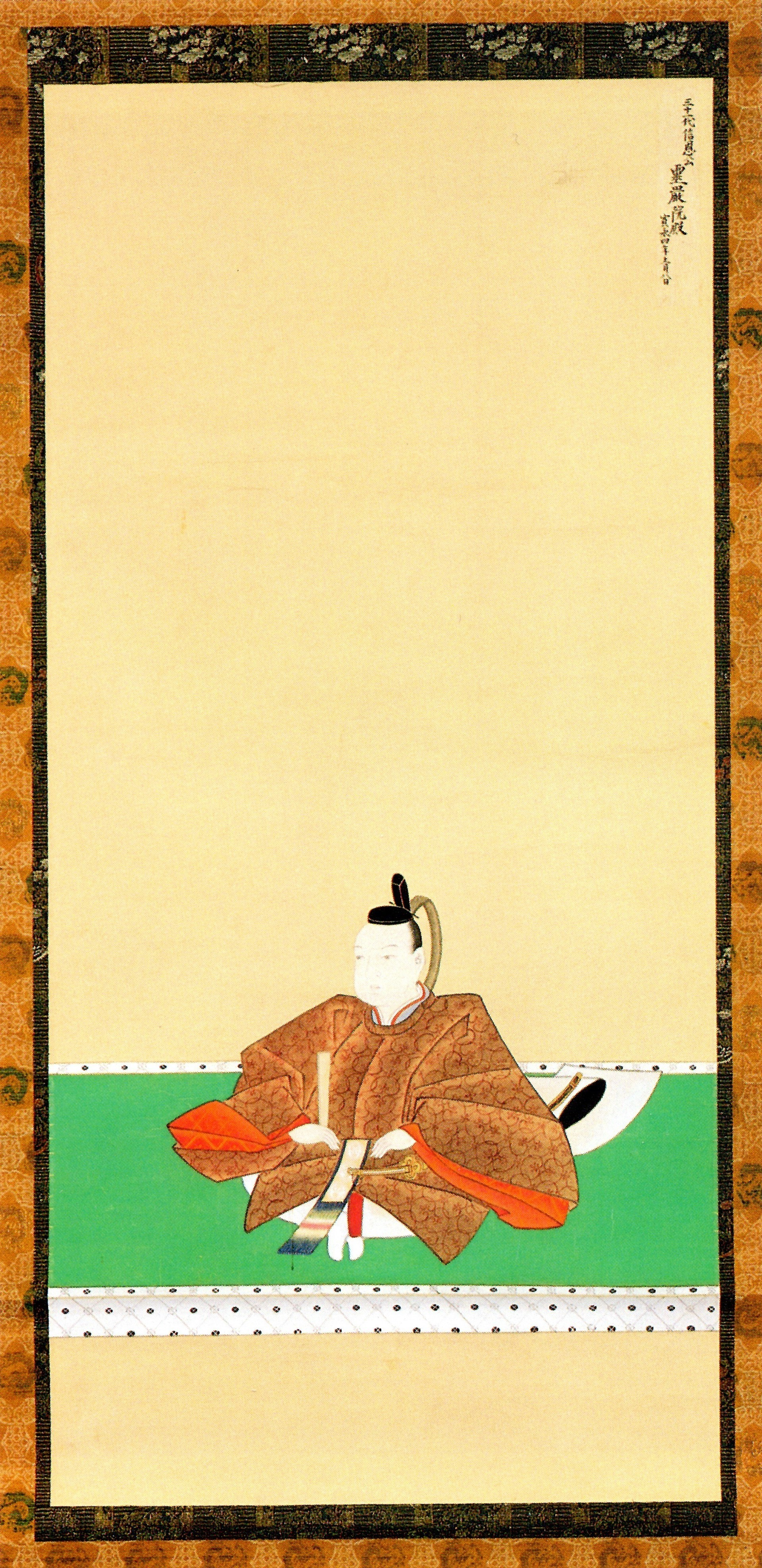
- Nanbu Nobuoki
- Born: November 6, 1678; Edo, Japan
- Died: December 31, 1707 (aged 29); Edo, Japan
- Title: Daimyō of Morioka Domain
- Predecessor: Nanbu Yukinobu
- Successor: Nanbu Toshimoto
- Spouse: daughter of Mōri Tsunamoto
- Children: Nanbu Toshimi
- Father: Nanbu Yukinobu

Nanbu Nobuoki (南部信恩; 6 November 1678 – 31 December 1707) was a mid-Edo period Japanese samurai, and the 5th daimyō of Morioka Domain in northern Japan. He was the 31st hereditary chieftain of the Nanbu clan. His courtesy title was Bingo-no-kami, and his Court rank was Junior Fifth Rank, Lower Grade.

Nobuoki was the 3rd son of Nanbu Yukinobu, the 4th daimyō of Morioka Domain. He was born in the domain's Azabu residence in Edo. As his older brother died young, he became heir on 1 May 1701, and was received in formal audience by shōgun Tokugawa Yoshimune on 15 May. On 25 July, he wed the daughter of Mōri Tsunamoto, daimyō of Chōfu Domain and on 18 December received the formal courtesy title of Bingo-no-kami. He became daimyō on the death of his father in November 1702. On 15 April 1703, he entered Morioka Domain for the first time.

At this time the domain was suffering from crop failure and immediately after he took office the 1703 Genroku earthquake destroyed the domain's Edo residences. As a result, the domain's finances were plunged further into arrears. During his short tenure, he was unable to overturn the strong influence of Confucianism introduced by his father into the domain's administration, and died on 31 December 1707 at a relatively young age.

On his death, his half-brother Nanbu Toshimoto, was adopted as his heir. However, Nobuoki's widow subsequently gave birth to a posthumous son, Nanbu Toshimi, who was later adopted by Nanbu Tomomoto, thus maintaining the direct line of succession.

Preceded by Nanbu Yukinobu	5th (Nanbu) Daimyō of Morioka; 1702–1705	Succeeded by Nanbu Toshimoto
