= Nanbu Toshihisa =

- 南部利剛
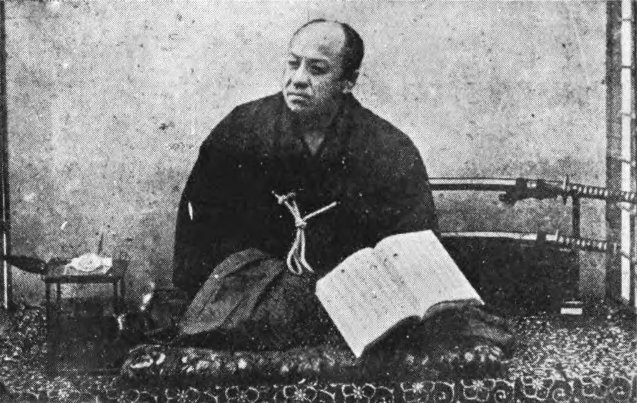
- Nanbu Toshihisa c.1896

14th Daimyō of Morioka Domain
- In office 1848–1868
- Monarchs: Shōgun: Tokugawa Ieyoshi; Tokugawa Iesada; Tokugawa Iemochi; Tokugawa Yoshinobu
- Preceded by: Nanbu Toshitomo
- Succeeded by: Nanbu Toshiyuki

Personal details
- Born: January 25, 1826; Morioka, Japan
- Died: October 30, 1896 (aged 70); Tokyo, Japan
- Spouse(s): Matsuhime, daughter of Tokugawa Nariaki, daimyō of Mito Domain
- Parent: Nanbu Toshitada (father)

Nanbu Toshihisa (南部利剛, 25 January 1827 to 30 October 1896) was a Bakumatsu period Japanese samurai, and the 14th daimyō of Morioka Domain in northern Japan. He was the 40th hereditary chieftain of the Nanbu clan.

== Biography ==
Nanbu Toshihisa was the 3rd son of Nanbu Toshitada, the 12th daimyō of Morioka Domain and was born in Morioka. He was initially adopted by Nanbu Nobunori as heir to Shichinohe Domain, but was returned to Morioka after the forced retirement of his brother, Nanbu Toshitomo in September 1849. He was received in a formal audience by Shōgun Tokugawa Ieyoshi, and received the courtesy title of Minō-no-kami and Junior 4th Rank, Lower Grade Court rank later the same year. In 1851 he received the additional courtesy title of Jijū (Chamberlain) and his court rank was increased to Senior 4th Rank.

At the time, the domain was divided into a faction supporting Toshitomo, and a faction supporting his father, Toshitada, who was still controlling the domain despite his official retirement. When Toshitomo was forced aside to permit the appointment of the more pliable Toshihisa, the domain erupted into widespread revolt in 1853. The rōjū Abe Masahiro responding by placing both Toshitada and Toshitomo under house arrest in Edo, thus removing their influence over the government of the domain. In 1861, his courtesy title was changed to Sashōshō.

Although he was approached by Kujō Michitaka to support the new Meiji government, Toshihisa led the domain into the Ōuetsu Reppan Dōmei during the Boshin War, and fought against the forces of the pro-Meiji Akita Domain. However, there was little support within the domain for the war, and he formally surrendered to the Meiji government on 9 October 1868. On 7 December, he was ordered to retire and was replaced as daimyō by his son, Nanbu Toshiyuki ten days later. Three of the senior karō of the domain committed seppuku rather than submit to the Meiji government.

On 30 October 1896, Toshihisa was posthumously awarded Senior Third Rank. His grave is at the temple of Gokoku-ji in Tokyo.

Toshihisa had at least 11 sons and 6 daughters. His eldest daughter married Prince Kachō Hirotsune, and one of his sons was adopted by Ōkuma Shigenobu.
