= Nanbu Yukinobu =

- 南部行信
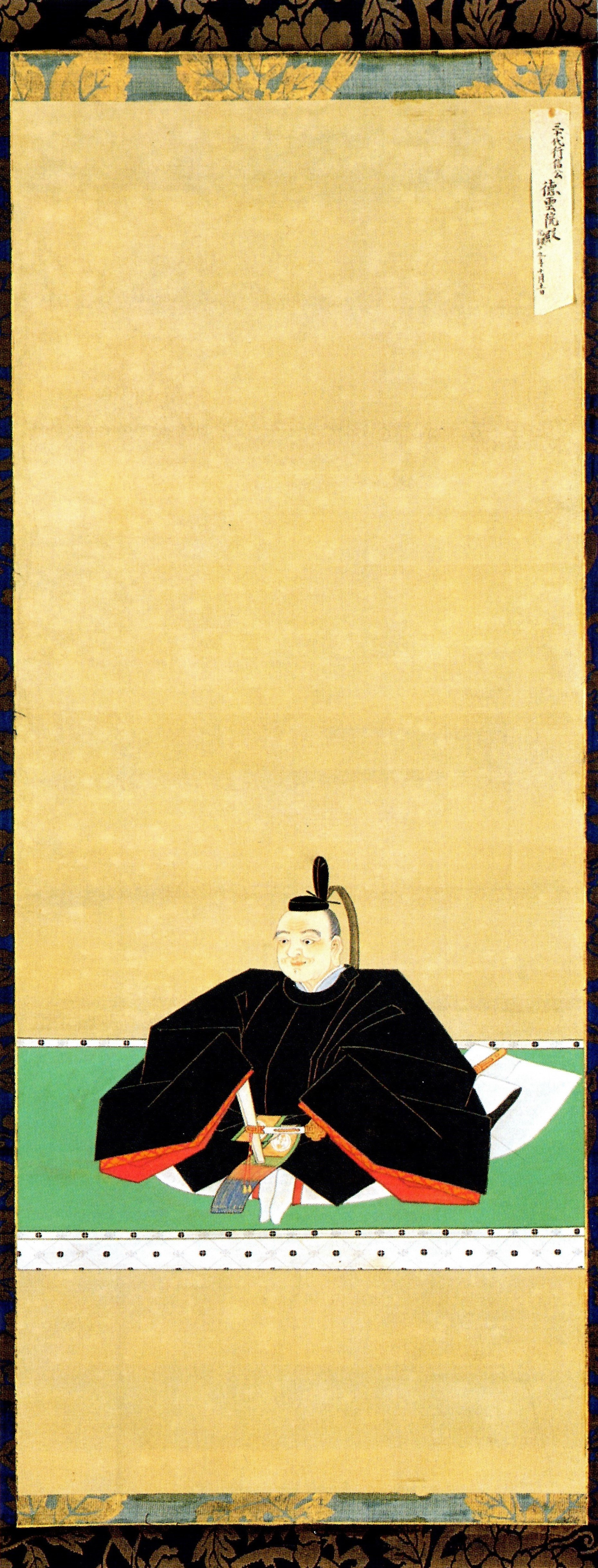
- Portrait of Nanbu Yukinobu
- Born: September 11, 1642; Morioka, Iwate, Japan
- Died: November 29, 1702 (aged 60); Edo, Japan
- Burial place: Shoju-ji, Morioka, Japan
- Title: Daimyō of Morioka Domain
- Predecessor: Nanbu Shigenobu
- Successor: Nanbu Nobuoki
- Spouse: daughter of Mōri Mitsuhiro
- Father: Nanbu Shigenobu

Nanbu Yukinobu (南部行信; 11 September 1642 – 29 November 1702) was an early to mid-Edo period Japanese samurai, and the 4th daimyō of Morioka Domain in northern Japan. He was the 30th hereditary chieftain of the Nanbu clan. His courtesy title was Shinano-no-kami, and his Court rank was Junior Fifth Rank, Lower Grade, later raised to Junior Fourth Rank, Lower Grade.

Yukinobu was born in Morioka as the eldest son of Nanbu Shigenobu, and was received in formal audience by shōgun Tokugawa Ietsuna on 28 April 1664. On 27 June 1692, on the retirement of his father, he became daimyō of Morioka Domain.

On 21 August 1694, he granted 5000 koku and 3000 koku of newly-developed rice lands to his two younger brothers, raising them to hatamoto status. As these grants were of new land, the nominal kokudaka of the domain remained unchanged at 100,000 koku. On 18 December 1699 his Court rank was raised to Junior Fourth Rank, Lower Grade.

Under Yukinobu’s tenure, he developed Hōjutsu as one of the martial arts of the domain, and was permitted to hold a demonstration in front of Shogun Tokugawa Tsunayoshi. However, also under his tenure, the Kazuno mines developed by his father did not produce the expected amount of revenues, and a crop failure from 1694 to 1695 lend to extensive famine throughout the domain. An estimated 40,000 people starved to death and the domain was plunged into debt. Development of new rice lands and public works projects were attempted, along with a halt to military horse breeding and increased fiscal austerity measures, but to little effect. Another famine in 1702 led to 26,000 more deaths.

Unable to manage these disasters, he increasing turned administrative affairs over to his younger brother, and concentrated on studies of Confucianism for advice, soliciting noted scholars for their opinions and even holding the funeral of his eldest son under Confucian, rather than Buddhist rites. These actions caused friction with his senior retainers. He died in Morioka in 1702, a few months after his father died in Edo.

Preceded by Nanbu Shigenobu	4th (Nanbu) Daimyō of Morioka; 1692–1702	Succeeded by Nanbu Nobuoki
