= Nanbu Toshikatsu =

Ancient Japanese samurai

- 南部利雄
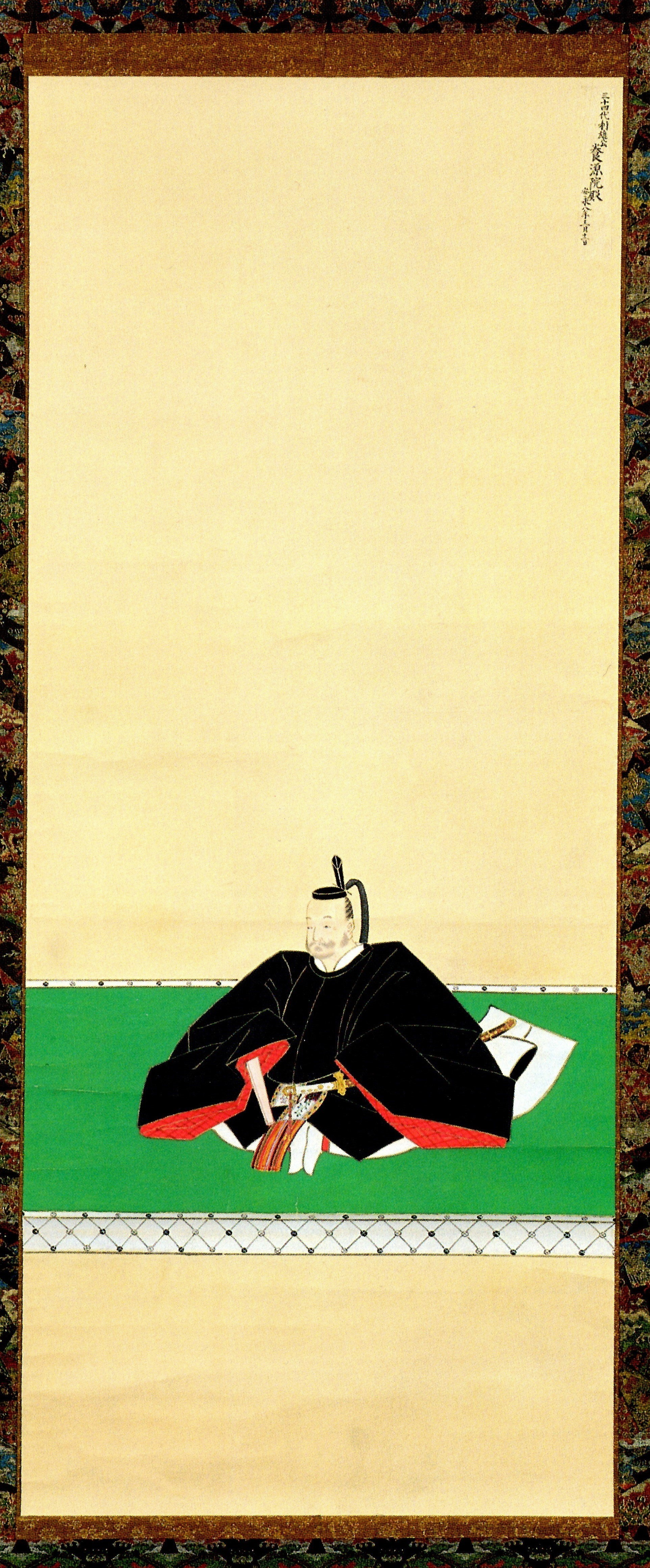
- Portrait of Nanbu Toshikatsu
- Born: July 30, 1724
- Died: January 11, 1780 (aged 71)
- Title: Daimyō of Morioka Domain
- Predecessor: Nanbu Toshimi
- Successor: Nanbu Toshikatsu
- Spouse(s): daughter of Maeda Toshiakira, daimyō of Daishōji Domain
- Father: Nanbu Toshimoto

Nanbu Toshikatsu (南部利雄; 30 July 1724 – 11 January 1780) was a mid-Edo period Japanese samurai, and the 8th daimyō of Morioka Domain in northern Japan. He was the 34th hereditary chieftain of the Nanbu clan. His courtesy title was Shinano-no-kami, (later Daizen-no-daifu) and his Court rank was Junior 4th Rank, Lower Grade.

Toshikatsu was the eldest son of Nanbu Toshimoto, the 6th daimyō of Morioka Domain. He was adopted by his uncle Nanbu Toshimi on 21 October 1738, and was received in formal audience by shōgun Tokugawa Yoshimune on 1 November of the same year. On 16 December he received the formal courtesy title of Shinano-no-kami and Junior 5th court rank. He became daimyō on the death of his uncle on 25 May 1725, and advanced to Junior 4th court rank on 16 December 1766.

His tenure was a difficult time for Morioka, which continued to suffer from repeated crop failures and famines. Some 60,000 people were estimated to have died in the famine of 1756, and with the domain facing bankruptcy, Toshikatsu was forced to appeal for assistance from the central government.

Toshikatsu’s eldest son Toshinori was disinherited in 1774 after fighting with shogunate officials, and later went into the priesthood. He adopted Nanbu Toshimasa, the hatamoto sixth son of Nanbu Toshimi as his heir and died in 1780.

== Notes ==
Preceded by Nanbu Toshimi	8th (Nanbu) Daimyō of Morioka; 1752–1780	Succeeded by Nanbu Toshimasa
