= Mizuko Nanbu =

- 南部 瑞子

Director of the Girl Scouts of Japan
- Incumbent
- Assumed office 1955

Mizuko Nanbu (南部 瑞子, Nanbu Mizuko; January 14, 1908 – October 30, 1980) was a Japanese member of the Nanbu clan from Morioka Domain. The eldest daughter of Toshiatsu Nanbu, the 43rd daimyō of Morioka Domain, and wife of Toshihide Nanbu, the 44th head, she served as the Director of the Girl Scouts of Japan from 1955.

She also served as an advisor to the Iwate Kenjinkai in Tokyo with her husband Toshihide.
