= Nambu =

Nambu may refer to:

== Firearms ==
- Nambu pistol, a Japanese firearm
- New Nambu M60, a Japanese revolver
- New Nambu M66
- Nambu Type 90
- Type 94 Nambu pistol
- 7×20mm Nambu
- 8×22mm Nambu

== People with the surname ==
- Chūhei Nambu (1904–1997), Japanese track-and-field athlete
- Hiroko Nambu (南部 博子, born 1968), Japanese cyclist
- Kenzo Nambu (born 1992), Japanese footballer
- Kijirō Nambu (1869–1949), Japanese gunmaker
- Yoichiro Nambu (1921–2015), Japanese American theoretical physicist

== Physics theory ==
- Nambu–Goto action
- Nambu-Goldstone boson
- Nambu mechanics
- Nambu–Jona-Lasinio model

== Other uses ==
- Nambu language or Nambo-Namna, of Papua New Guinea
- Nambu languages, of Papua New Guinea
- Nambu (station), on the Busan Subway
- Nambu Line, a railway line between Tokyo and Kanagawa, Japan
- National Union of General Workers (Zenrokyo), in Japan

== See also ==
- Nanbu (disambiguation)
