= Toshifumi Ohkusa =

Japanese physician and academic

- Occupations: Academic and author

Academic background
- Education: M.D. PhD
- Alma mater: Tokyo Medical and Dental University

Academic work
- Institutions: Juntendo University

Toshifumi Ohkusa is a Japanese academic and author. He is a special professor at Juntendo University Graduate School of Medicine. Ohkusa is known for his works on microbial and pathogenic processes underlying gastrointestinal diseases.

== Education ==
Ohkusa completed his MD degree from Tokyo Medical and Dental University in 1978. In 1986, he completed his PhD from the same institution.

== Career ==
Ohkusa began his academic career in 1986 as a research associate and instructor at the Tokyo Medical and Dental University, serving until 2001. Following this, he joined Juntendo University, where he was appointed assistant professor from 2001 to 2004. From 2005 to 2008, he worked as an associate professor there. Subsequently, he joined Jikei University Kashiwa Hospital, where he was a professor until 2017. Since 2017, he has been a special professor at Juntendo University Graduate School of Medicine.
