= Nanbu Toshitaka =

Mid-Edo period Japanese samurai

- 南部利敬
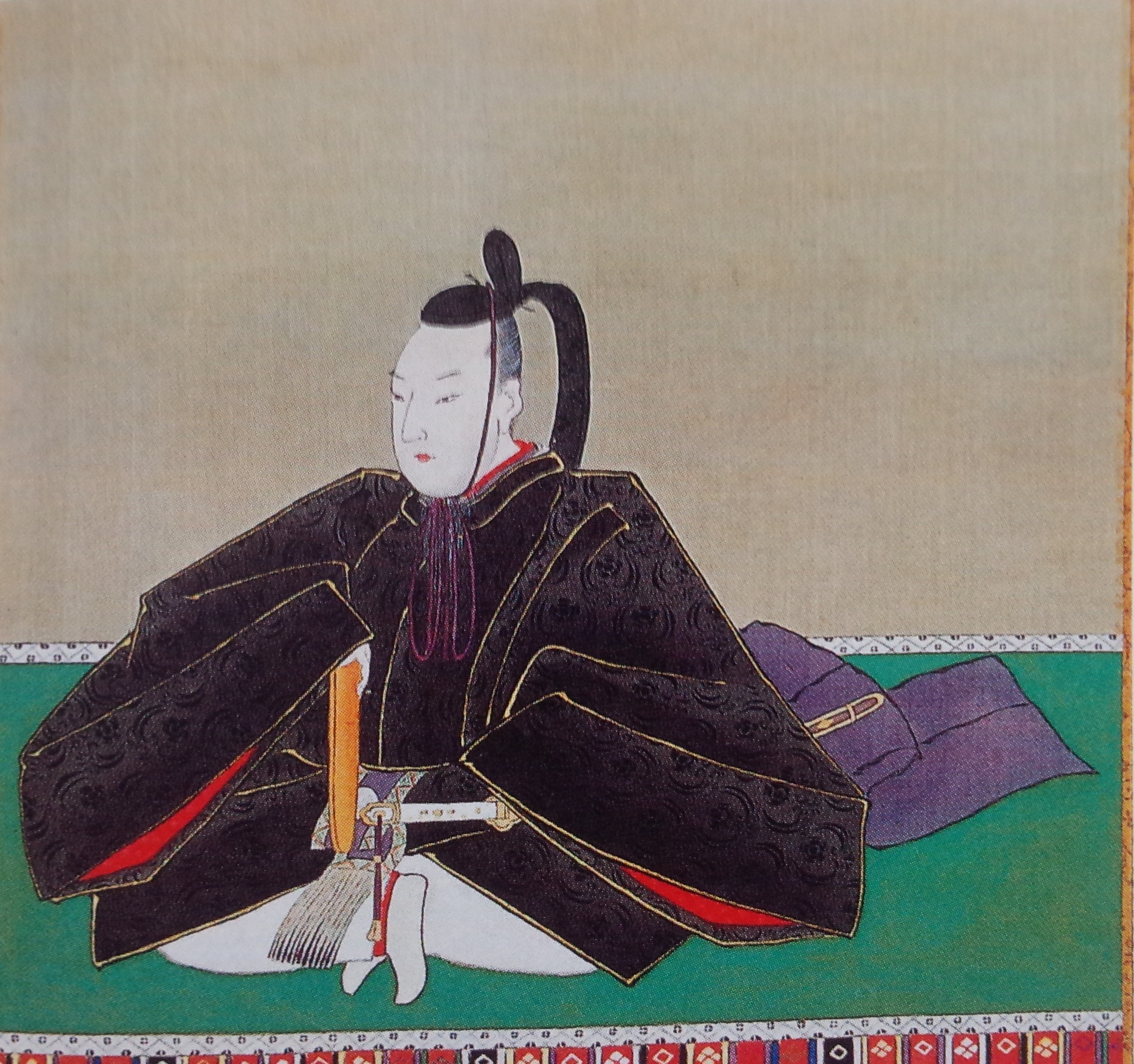
- Portrait of Nannbu Toshitaka
- Born: November 4, 1782
- Died: July 12, 1820 (aged 37)
- Title: Daimyō of Morioka Domain
- Predecessor: Nanbu Toshimasa
- Successor: Nanbu Toshimochi
- Spouse(s): daughter of Asao Shigeakira, daimyo of Hiroshima Domain
- Father: Nanbu Toshimasa

Nanbu Toshitaka (南部利敬; 4 November 1782 – 12 July 1820) was a mid-Edo period Japanese samurai, and the 10th daimyō of Morioka Domain in northern Japan. He was the 36th hereditary chieftain of the Nanbu clan. His courtesy title was Daizen-no-daifu, and his Court rank was Junior 4th Rank, Lower Grade.

Toshitaka was the younger son of Nanbu Toshimasa, the 9th daimyō of Morioka Domain, and became daimyō on the death of his father on 17 July 1784. As he was only two years old at the time, there were concerns that the Tokugawa shogunate would use this as an excuse to dissolve Morioka Domain, so his official birthdate was changed from 1782 to 1779. He was not received in formal audience by shōgun Tokugawa Ienari until 15 February 1795, and first entered his domains on 13 April of the same year. Due to his youth, the domain was rife with political factionalism, and suffered greatly from the effects of the Great Tenmei famine.

In 1817, the domain was officially renamed from "Nanbu Domain" to "Morioka Domain". On 18 December 1818, he was promoted to the honorary title of Jijū (Chamberlain), and Morioka Domain was assigned an area in southern Ezo to police on behalf of the Shogunate. The kokudaka of Morioka Domain was officially doubled to 200,000 koku. The same year, Toshitaka promulgated a reformed version of the domain's internal laws. In 1818, he raised one of the hatamoto branch lines of the clan to the status of a subsidiary domain, Shichinohe Domain, and permitted some of his senior retainers to take the Nanbu surname as their own.

Nanbu Toshitaka was noted for promoting is retainers based on ability, regardless of family backgrounds; however, this created much ill-will among the older established retainer houses. After his death in 1820, the domain again suffered from much political in-fighting and factionalism.

== Notes ==
Preceded by Nanbu Toshimasa	10th (Nanbu) Daimyō of Morioka; 1784–1820	Succeeded by Nanbu Toshimochi
