= Nanbu Toshiyuki =

Bakumatsu period Japanese samurai

Count Nanbu Toshiyuki
- 南部利恭
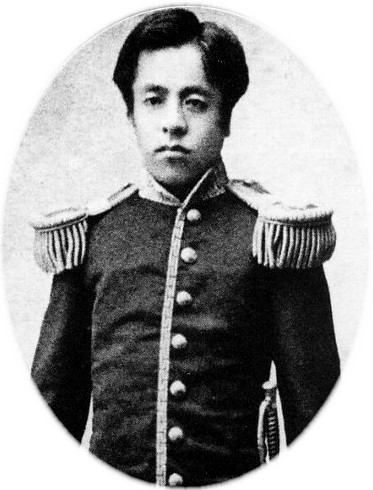
- Nambu Toshiyuki in July 1899

15th Daimyō of Morioka Domain
- In office 1868–1868
- Monarch: Shōgun: Tokugawa Yoshinobu
- Preceded by: Nanbu Toshihisa
- Succeeded by: < position abolished >

Imperial Governor of Shiraishi
- In office 1869–1870
- Monarch: Emperor Meiji

Imperial Governor of Morioka
- In office 1870–1871
- Monarch: Emperor Meiji

Personal details
- Born: November 18, 1855
- Died: October 19, 1903 (aged 47)
- Spouse(s): Teru, daughter of Date Munenari, daimyō of Uwajima Domain
- Domestic partner(s): Ikuhime, daughter of Mizoguchi Naohiro, daimyō of Shibata Domain
- Parents: Nanbu Toshihisa (father); daughter of Tokugawa Nariaki, daimyō of Mito Domain (mother)

Count Nanbu Toshiyuki (南部利恭, 18 November 1855 to 19 October 1903) was a Bakumatsu period Japanese samurai, and the 15th and final daimyō of Morioka Domain in northern Japan. He was the 41st hereditary chieftain of the Nanbu clan.

Nanbu Yoshiyuki was the eldest son of Nanbu Toshihisa, the 14th daimyō of Morioka Domain. Yoshiyuki, together with Nanbu Nobutami, the daimyō of Shichinohe Domain, he surrendered his forces to the new Meiji government on 9 October 1868 during the Boshin War. On 2 December, he travelled to Tokyo with his father, and was re-confirmed as daimyō of Morioka Domain by the new government ten days later. However, as Yoshiyasu had actually participated in combat against the Meiji government against the forces of Akita Domain in the war, the appointment was withdrawn only five days later, and on 24 December, his position was abolished and his territories were seized. The Nanbu clan was ordered to transfer to Shiraishi Domain (130,000 koku) in southern Mutsu Province instead. On 18 June 1869, with the abolition of the han system, he became domain governor of Shiraishi, and on 28 June he received the courtesy title of Kai-no-kami and Court rank Junior 5th Court Rank, lower grade.

On 22 July, Yoshiyuki applied to be returned to Morioka as domain governor, and the government agreed in exchange for a donation of 700,000 gold ryō. Although he proved unable to raise the funds, he was transferred to Morioka in July 1870. His stay in Morioka was short, as with the abolition of the han system in 1871, he was ordered to live in Tokyo, where he founded the Kyōkan Gijuku, a school of western learning, whose students included the noted writer Natsume Sōseki.

Yoshiyuki was elevated to the title of Count (hakushaku) in the kazoku peerage system on 7 July 1884.

On 20 June 1902, shortly before his death, he was awarded Senior Third Rank. His grave is at the temple of Gokoku-ji in Tokyo.

His eldest son and heir, Nanbu Toshinaga, was an officer in the Imperial Japanese Army, and was killed in combat during the Russo-Japanese War while serving with the Guards Regiment. The title of Count and position of 43rd chieftain of the Nanbu clan went to his second son, Nanbu Toshiatsu.
