= Minamoto no Mitsuyuki =

Governor in Kawachi province

Minamoto no Mitsuyuki (源 光行 1163–1244) was an author, as well as governor in Kawachi province. Mitsuyuki's cousin was the famous samurai Yorimasa.

Minamoto no Mitsuyuki was a prolific and noted writer, producing works of instruction for children, commentary on both Japanese and Chinese literature, and poetry. He studied under Shunzei.
