= Nanbu Toshimi =

Japanese samurai chieftain (1708-1752)

- 南部利視
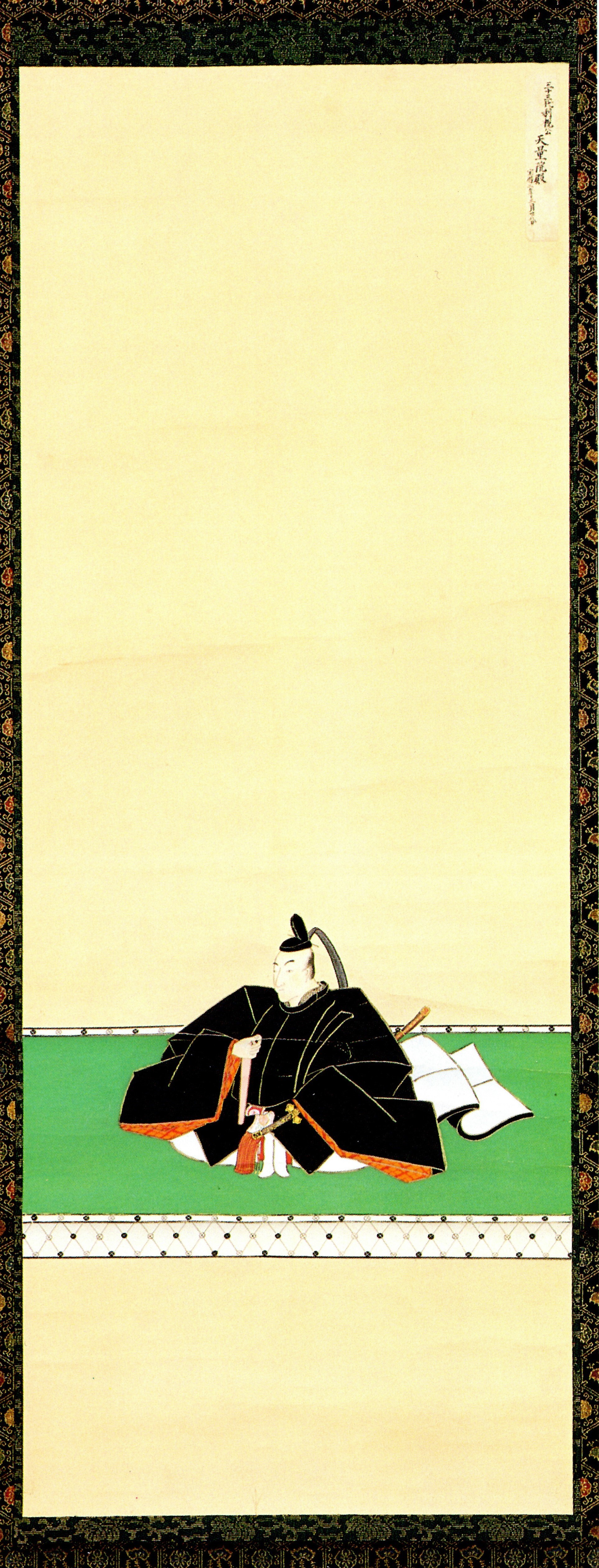
- Portrait of Nanbu Toshimi
- Born: June 14, 1708
- Died: May 11, 1752 (aged 43)
- Title: Daimyō of Morioka Domain
- Predecessor: Nanbu Toshimoto
- Successor: Nanbu Toshikatsu
- Spouse(s): daughter of Yanagihara Masakune, daimyō of Himeji Domain
- Father: Nanbu Nobuoki

Nanbu Toshimi (南部利視; 14 June 1708 – 11 May 1752) was a mid-Edo period Japanese samurai, and the 7th daimyō of Morioka Domain in northern Japan. He was the 33rd hereditary chieftain of the Nanbu clan. His courtesy title was Shuri-no-daifu, (later Daizen-no-daifu) and his Court rank was Junior 4th Rank, Lower Grade.

Toshimi was the posthumous son of Nanbu Nobuoki, the 5th daimyō of Morioka Domain. He was posthumously adopted by his uncle Nanbu Toshimoto on 21 July 1725, becoming the 7th daimyō of Morioka. He was received in formal audience by shōgun Tokugawa Yoshimune on 28 July, and received the formal courtesy title of Shuri-no daifu and Junior 5th court rank, lower grade on 18 December of the same year. On 18 December 1750, he was elevated to Junior 4th court rank. He also received a dispensation on wearing his hair in the standard chonmage style due to his baldness.

Toshimi's eldest son was demoted to hatamoto status and his three younger sons were allowed to form branches of the Sannohe clan; he adopted Nanbu Toshikatsu, eldest son of his uncle Toshimoto as his heir before he died in 1752.

Preceded by Nanbu Toshimoto	7th (Nanbu) Daimyō of Morioka; 1725–1752	Succeeded by Nanbu Toshikatsu
