= Morioka Domain =

Japanese estate in Mutsu province

Morioka Domain 盛岡藩
- Domain of Japan
- 1599–1870
- Flag

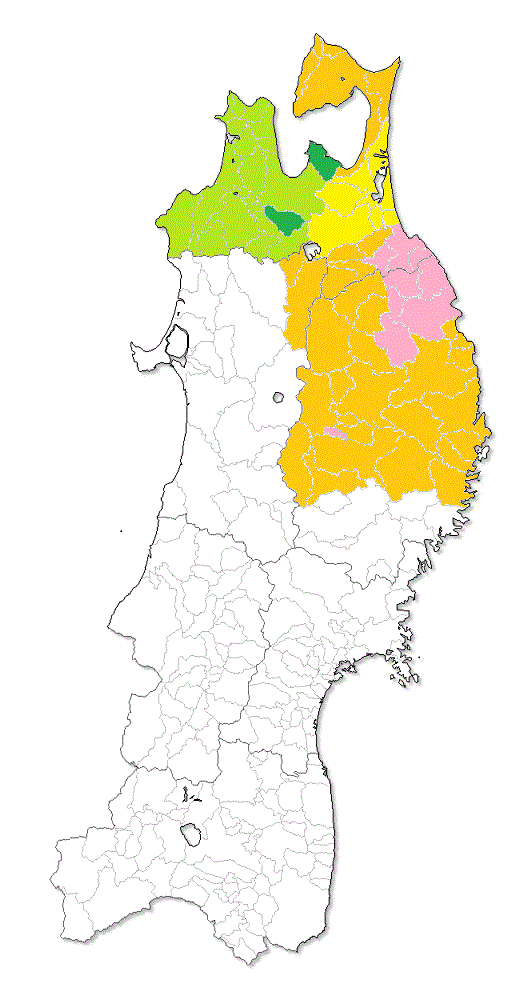
- Map of Nanbu and Tsugaru clan holdings in the late Edo period. Morioka Domain in orange, Hachinohe Domain in pink and Shichinohe Domain in yellow; lands of the rival Tsugaru Domain are in green
- Capital: Morioka Castle
- Area
  - Coordinates: 39°41′59.81″N 141°09′0.04″E
- Government
  - Type: Daimyō
- Historical era: Edo period
  - Established: 1599
  - Disestablished: 1870
Preceded by	Succeeded by
Mutsu Province	Morioka Prefecture
- Today part of: Iwate Prefecture; Aomori Prefecture; Akita Prefecture

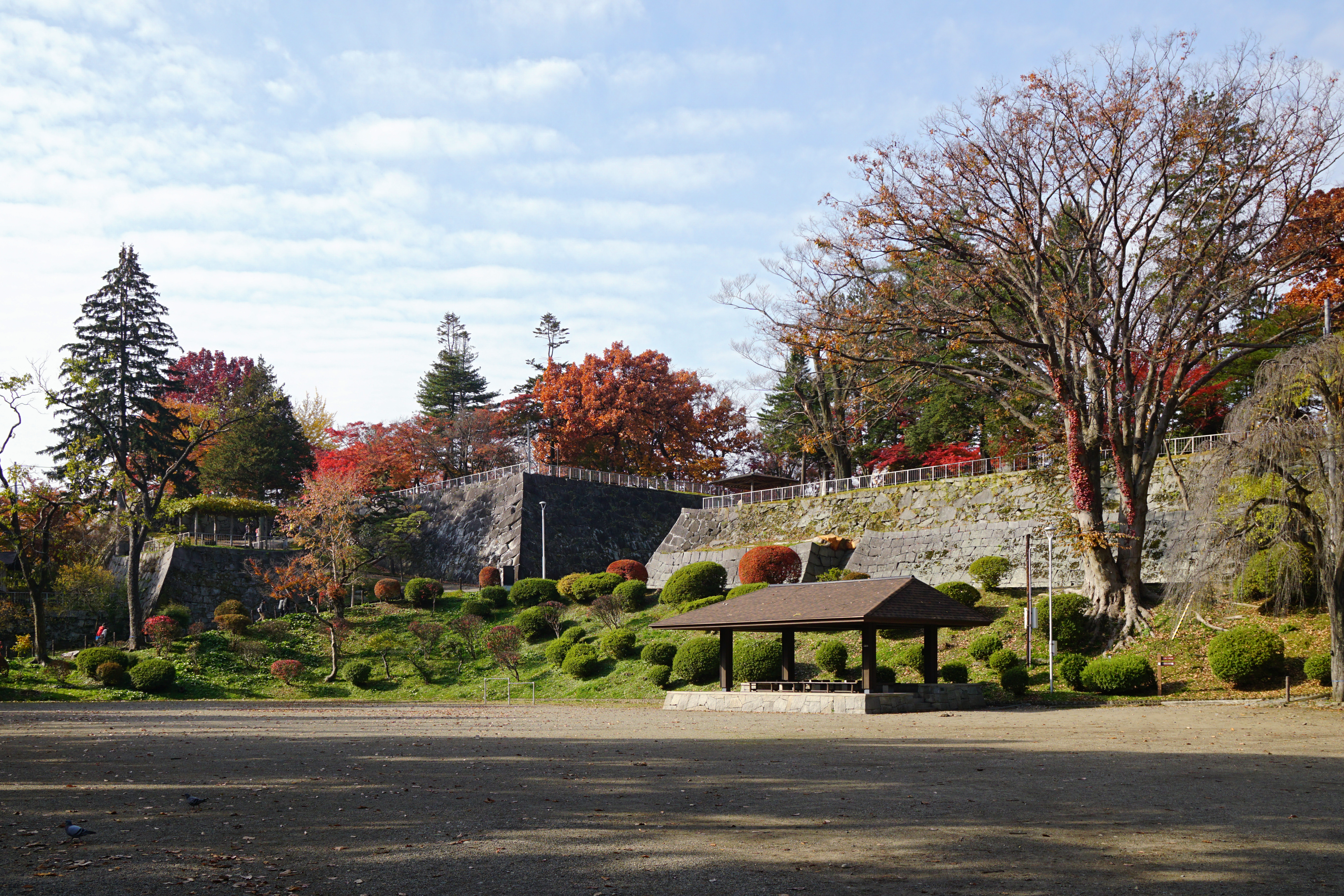
Ruins of Morioka Castle

Morioka Domain (盛岡藩, Morioka-han) was a tozama feudal domain of Edo period Japan. It was ruled throughout its history by the Nanbu clan. It was called Nanbu Domain (南部藩, Nanbu han) during the early part of its history. It was located in northern Mutsu Province, Honshū, covering the eastern half of what is now Aomori Prefecture and the northern two-thirds of what is now Iwate Prefecture and the Kazuno District of what is now Akita Prefecture. The domain was centered at Morioka Castle in the city of Morioka. For most of its history, Morioka Domain had an official kokudaka of 100,000 koku, although its actual revenues were much higher. Towards the end of the Edo period, the domain's status was raised to 200,000 koku.

== History ==
The Nanbu clan was a branch of the Seiwa Genji originally from Kai Province, who settled in what is now the town of Nanbu, Aomori after the conquest of the Hiraizumi Fujiwara by Minamoto no Yoritomo. Along with the Shimazu clan of Satsuma Province, the Nanbu clan has the distinction of being one of the two clans which held onto their territories for over 700 years, from the Kamakura period to the Meiji Restoration.

In July 1590, the 26th chieftain of the Nanbu clan, Nanbu Nobunao, made an oath of fealty to Toyotomi Hideyoshi at the Siege of Odawara, and was officially confirmed as daimyō of seven districts of northern Mutsu province (Nukanobu, Hei, Kazuno, Kuji, Iwate, Shiwa and Tōno). Hideyoshi assisted in the suppression of the Kunohe Rebellion of 1591 which secured Nobunao's position as head of all the branches of the Nanbu clan. However, Hideyoshi also recognised the independence of the Tsugaru clan, former Nanbu retainers, and their control over the three districts of Tsugaru Peninsula, but gave the Nanbu clan the additional districts of Hienuki and Waga as compensation. Nanbu Nobunao relocated his seat from Sannohe Castle to the more central location of Morioka, and began work on Morioka Castle and its surrounding castle town in 1592.

In 1600, following the Battle of Sekigahara, Nanbu Nobunao's son Nanbu Toshinao was confirmed by Tokugawa Ieyasu as daimyō with an assessed kokudaka of 100,000 koku. This marks the official start of Morioka Domain under the Tokugawa shogunate.

In 1627, in order to strengthen its southern border against the Date clan of Sendai Domain, a branch of the Nanbu clan from Ne Castle near Hachinohe was relocated to Tōno, forming a subsidiary line.

In 1634, Nukanobu District was divided into the four districts of Sannohe, Ninohe, Kunohe and Kita by order of the shōgun Tokugawa Iemitsu, giving the Nanbu clan control over a total of 10 districts of Mutsu province.

In 1664, the 20,000 koku Hachinohe Domain was split from Morioka Domain as a nominally subsidiary domain. However, relations between Morioka and Hachinohe were often strained and Hachinohe was considered independent, rather than a subsidiary. Morioka Domain was thus reduced to 80,000 koku, but was able to develop new rice lands, and reverted to 100,000 koku status in 1683. The 5th daimyō, Nanbu Yukinobu, reduced the domain to 92,000 koku by setting up his two younger brothers as hatamoto with 5000 koku and 3000 koku each.

In 1808, the Tokugawa shogunate assigned the Nanbu clan responsibility for the defence of a portion of southern Ezo. The nominal kokudaka for Morioka clan was raised to 200,000 koku and their status from "castle-holding daimyō" to "province-holding daimyō". However, this increase in status came without any actual increase in territory, and the additional actual revenues from trading posts established in Ezo was small. The result was to plunge the domain's finances, already suffering from repeated crop failures due to inclement weather and reduction in output from its copper mines, into the red.

In 1819, the subsidiary Shichinohe Domain was created out of 6000 koku of new rice land combined with a 5000-koku hatamoto holding.

In 1821, the Sōma Daisaku incident, in which a retainer of the Nanbu clan attempted to assassinate the daimyō of Tsugaru Domain occurred. The Nanbu clan and the Tsugaru clan had been enemies for centuries. This was the same year during which the domain faced its most serious crisis. The 11th daimyō, Nanbu Toshimochi, died at the age of 13 before he could be formally received in audience by shōgun Tokugawa Ienari. Fearing that this could be used by the shogunate as a cause for attainder, the domain leaders substituted a cousin of similar age and appearance to take his place.

In 1840, a han school was established, and began promoting studies in rangaku (western science), especially western medicine.

During the Bakumatsu period, in 1857 the 14th daimyō of Morioka, Nanbu Toshihisa, married the third daughter of Tokugawa Nariaki of Mito Domain. With the start of the Boshin War, the domain initially attempted to remain neutral, but bowed to pressure from Sendai Domain and joined the Ōuetsu Reppan Dōmei. Morioka forces attacked the pro-Imperial Tsugaru Domain and Akita Domain. As a result, the new Meiji government treated Nanbu clan harshly at the end of the war by seizing the territory and expelling the Nanbu clan to the vacant Shiroishi Castle, where a new 130,000 koku domain was created out of former Sendai Domain lands in early 1868.

Six months later, the Nanbu petitioned to return to Morioka, to which the government agreed provided that they paid a penalty of 700,000 gold ryō. Although this sum proved impossible amount to raise, the Nanbu were allowed to return shortly before the abolition of the han system. The lands of former Morioka Domain became Morioka Prefecture, which subsequently became part of Iwate Prefecture in January 1872.

== List of daimyōs ==
- Nanbu clan (tozama) 1599–1871

	Name	Tenure	Courtesy title	Court Rank	Kokudaka
1	Nanbu Toshinao (南部利直)	1599–1632	Shinano-no-kami (信濃守)	Senior 4th Rank, Lower Grade (従四位下)	100,000 koku
2	Nanbu Shigenao (南部重直)	1632–1664	Yamashiro-no-kami (山城守)	Senior 5th Rank, Lower Grade (従五位下)	100,000 koku
3	Nanbu Shigenobu (南部重信)	1664–1692	Daizen-no-taifu (大膳大夫)	Senior 4th Rank, Lower Grade (従四位下)	80,000 ->100,000 koku
4	Nanbu Yukinobu (南部行信)	1692–1702	Shinano-no-kami (信濃守)	Senior 4th Rank, Lower Grade (従四位下)	100,000 koku
5	Nanbu Nobuoki (南部信恩)	1702–1705	Bingo-no-kami (備後守)	Senior 5th Rank, Lower Grade (従五位下)	100,000 koku
6	Nanbu Toshitomo (南部利幹)	1705–1725	Shinano-no-kami (信濃守)	Senior 4th Rank, Lower Grade (従四位下)	100,000 koku
7	Nanbu Toshimi (南部利視)	1725–1752	Daizen-no-daifu (大膳大夫)	Senior 4th Rank, Lower Grade (従四位下)	100,000 koku
8	Nanbu Toshikatsu (南部利雄)	1752–1779	Daizen-no-taifu (大膳大夫)	Senior 4th Rank, Lower Grade (従四位下)	100,000 koku
9	Nanbu Toshimasa (南部利正)	1780–1784	Daizen-no-taifu (大膳大夫)	Senior 4th Rank, Lower Grade (従四位下)	100,000 koku
10	Nanbu Toshitaka (南部利敬)	1784–1820	Daizen-no-taifu (大膳大夫)	Senior 4th Rank, Lower Grade (従四位下)	100,000 ->200,000 koku
11	Nanbu Toshimochi (南部利用)	1820–1825	Daizen-no-taifu (大膳大夫)	Senior 4th Rank, Lower Grade (従四位下)	200,000 koku
12	Nanbu Toshitada (南部利済)	1825–1847	Shinano-no-kami (信濃守)	Senior 4th Rank, Lower Grade (従四位下)	200,000 koku
13	Nanbu Toshitomo (南部利義)	1847–1848	Kai-no-kami (甲斐守)	Senior 4th Rank, Lower Grade (従四位下)	200,000 koku
14	Nanbu Toshihisa (南部利剛)	1848–1868	Minō-no-kami (美濃守), Jijū (侍従)	Senior 4th Rank, Lower Grade (従四位下)	200,000 koku
15	Nanbu Toshiyuki (南部利恭)	1868–1871	Kai-no-kami (甲斐守)	Senior 5th Rank, Lower Grade (従五位下)	200,000 koku

=== Genealogy ===
- I. Nanbu Toshinao, 1st daimyō of Morioka (cr. 1599) (1576–1632; r. 1599–1632)
  - II. Shigenao, 2nd daimyō of Morioka (1606–1664; r. 1632–1664)
  - III. Shigenobu, 3rd daimyō of Morioka (1616–1702; r. 1664–1692)
    - IV. Yukinobu, 4th daimyō of Morioka (1642–1702; r. 1692–1702)
      - V. Nobuoki, 5th daimyō of Morioka (1678–1707; r. 1702–1705)
        - VII. Toshimi, 7th daimyō of Morioka (1708–1752; r. 1725–1752)
          - IX. Toshimasa, 9th daimyō of Morioka (1751–1784; r. 1780–1784)
            - X. Toshitaka, 10th daimyō of Morioka (1782–1820; r. 1784–1820)
          - son
            - Nobusuke
              - XI (a). Toshimichi I, 11th daimyō of Morioka (1808–1821; r. 1820–1821)
          - son
            - Nobutoro
              - XI (b). Toshimichi II, 12th daimyō of Morioka (1803–1825; r. 1821–1825)
      - VI. Toshitomo, 6th daimyō of Morioka (1689–1725; r. 1705–1725)
        - VIII. Toshikatsu, 8th daimyō of Morioka (1724–1780; r. 1752–1779)
          - Toshinori (1746–1814)
            - XII. Toshitada, 12th daimyō of Morioka (1797–1855; r. 1825–1847)
              - XIII. Toshitomo, 13th daimyō of Morioka (1824–1888; r. 1847–1848)
              - XIV. Toshihisa, 14th daimyō of Morioka (1827–1896; r. 1848–1868)
                - XV. Toshiyuki, 15th daimyō of Morioka, 41st family head, 1st Count (1855–1903; Lord: 1868–1869; Governor: 1869–1871; 41st family head: 1868–1903; Count: cr. 1884)
                  - Toshinaga, 2nd Count, 42nd family head (1882 – k.i.a. in Manchuria, 1905; 42nd family head and 2nd Count: 1903–1905)
                  - Toshiatsu, 3rd Count, 43rd family head (1884–1930; 43rd family head and 3rd Count: 1905–1930)
                    - Mizuko (1908–1980), m. Nanbu (Ichijō) Toshihide, 4th Count, 44th family head (1907–1980; 44th family head: 1930–1980; 4th Count: 1930–1947)
                      - Toshihisa (1932–1980)
                        - Toshifumi, 46th family head (b. 1970; 46th family head: 2009–)
                      - Toshiaki, 45th family head (1935–2009; 45th family head: 1980–2009)

== Bakumatsu period holdings ==
Like most domains in the han system, Morioka Domain consisted of discontinuous territories calculated to provide the assigned kokudaka, based on periodic cadastral surveys and projected agricultural yields. At the end of the Tokugawa shogunate, the domain consisted of the following holdings:

- Mutsu Province
  - 68 villages in Ninohe District
  - all of Kita District
- Mutsu Province (Rikuchū Province)
  - 85 villages in Iwate District
  - 68 villages in Hienuki District
  - 69 villages in Waga District
  - 138 villages in Hei District
  - 70 villages in Kakuno District
  - 71 villages in Shiwa District
  - 11 villages in Kunohe District
- Mutsu Province (Iwashiro Province)
  - 8 villages in Date District
- Ezo (Iburi Province)
  - southeastern Muroran District
  - Horobetsu District
  - southwest Abuta District

== In popular culture ==
In fiction, the Morioka domain is the setting for sections of the novel Mibugishiden, as well as the film The Twilight Samurai.

== See also ==
- List of Han
- When the Last Sword is Drawn
