= Nanbu clan =

Japanese samurai clan

Nanbu clan 南部氏
- Nanbu clan emblem
- Home province: Kai; Mutsu
- Parent house: Minamoto clan
- Titles: Various
- Founder: Minamoto no Mitsuyuki
- Final ruler: Nanbu Toshiyuki
- Current head: Toshifumi Nanbu
- Founding year: 1180
- Dissolution: still extant
- Ruled until: 1873 (Abolition of the han system)

The Nanbu clan (南部氏, Nanbu-shi) was a Japanese samurai clan who ruled most of northeastern Honshū in the Tōhoku region of Japan for over 700 years, from the Kamakura period through the Meiji Restoration of 1868. The Nanbu claimed descent from the Seiwa Genji of Kai Province and were thus related to the Takeda clan. The clan moved its seat from Kai to Mutsu Province in the early Muromachi period, and were confirmed as daimyō of Morioka Domain under the Edo-period Tokugawa shogunate. The domain was in constant conflict with neighboring Hirosaki Domain, whose ruling Tsugaru clan were once Nanbu retainers.

During the Boshin War of 1868–69, the Nanbu clan fought on the side of the Ōuetsu Reppan Dōmei, supporting the Tokugawa regime. After the Meiji Restoration, the Nanbu clan had much of its land confiscated, and in 1871, the heads of its branches were relieved of office. In the Meiji period, the former daimyō became part of the kazoku peerage, with Nanbu Toshiyuki receiving the title of hakushaku (count). The main Nanbu line survives to the present day; Toshiaki Nanbu served as the chief priest of Yasukuni Shrine.

== Origins ==
The Nanbu clan claimed descent from the Seiwa Genji of Kai Province. Minamoto no Yoshimitsu was awarded Kai Province following the Gosannen War, and his great-grandson Nobuyoshi took the surname Takeda. Another great-grandson, Mitsuyuki, took the name "Nanbu", after the location of his estates in Kai Province, which are now part of the town of Nanbu, Yamanashi. Nanbu Mitsuyuki joined Minamoto no Yoritomo at the Battle of Ishibashiyama and served in various mid-level positions within the Kamakura shogunate and is mentioned several times in the Azuma Kagami. He accompanied Yoritomo in the conquest of the Hiraizumi Fujiwara in 1189, and was awarded with vast estates in Nukanobu District the extreme northeast of Honshū, building Shōjujidate Castle in what is now Nanbu, Aomori. The area was dominated by horse ranches, and the Nanbu grew powerful and wealthy on the supply of warhorses. These horse ranches were fortified stockades, numbered one through nine (Ichinohe through Kunohe), and were awarded to the six sons of Nanbu Mitsuyuki, forming the six main branches of the Nanbu clan.

During the Nanboku-chō period following the fall of the Kamakura shogunate in 1333, Nanbu Motoyuki accompanied Kitabatake Akiie north when he was appointed Commander-in-Chief of the Defense of the North, and Shugo of Mutsu Province. Nanbu Motoyuki established Ne Castle, which was intended to be a center for the imperial government administration in the area. This marked the official transfer of the seat of the Nanbu clan from Kai Province to Mutsu. Nanbu Motoyuki was under allegiance to the Southern Court; however, at the same time, another branch of the same Nanbu family ruled the nearby Sannohe and Morioka areas under allegiance to the rival Northern Court. The two branches of the clan made peace with each other in 1393.

== Sengoku period ==
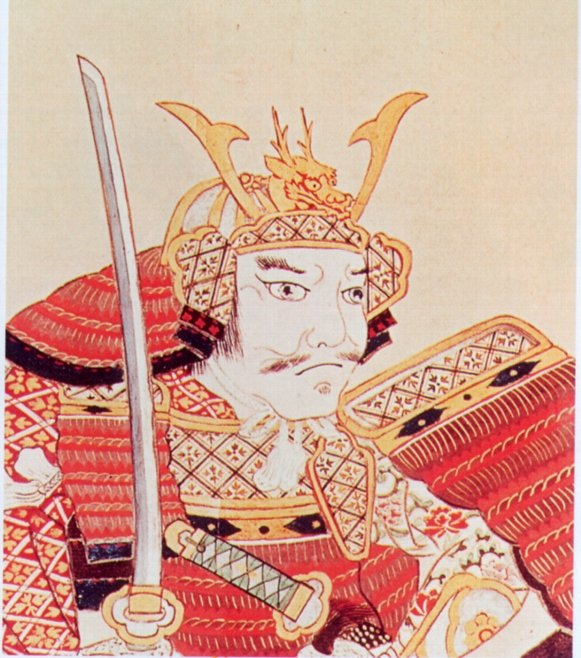
Nanbu Nobunao, Nanbu clan head in the Azuchi–Momoyama period

Although the Nanbu clan by the time of the 24th hereditary chieftain Nanbu Harumasa controlled seven districts of northern Mutsu province (Nukanobu, Hei, Kazuno, Kuji, Iwate, Shiwa and Tōno), the clan was more of a loose collection of competing branches without strong central authority.

This weakness was exploited by the Ōura clan, a cadet branch of the Nanbu, who revolted in 1572. Ōura Tamenobu was vice-district magistrate (郡代補佐, gundai hosa) under the Nanbu clan's local magistrate Ishikawa Takanobu; however, he attacked and killed Ishikawa and began taking the Nanbu clan's castles. Tamenobu also attacked Kitabatake Akimura (another local power figure) and took Namioka Castle. The Ōura clan's fight against the Nanbu clan, beginning with Nanbu Nobunao, would continue in the ensuing two centuries. In 1590, Tamenobu pledged fealty to Toyotomi Hideyoshi; Hideyoshi confirmed Tamenobu in his holdings, effectively putting him out of the Nanbu clan's grasp. As the Ōura fief had been in the Tsugaru region on the northwestern tip of Honshū, the family then changed its name to "Tsugaru".

After the death of Nanbu Harumasa in 1582, the clan split into several competing factions. In 1590, the Sannohe faction led by Nanbu Nobunao organized a coalition of most of the Nambu clans and pledged allegiance to Toyotomi Hideyoshi at the Siege of Odawara. In return, he was recognized as chieftain of the Nanbu clans, and confirmed as daimyō of his existing holdings (except for Tsugaru). However, Kunohe Masazane, who felt that he had a stronger claim to the title of clan chieftain, immediately rose in rebellion. The Kunohe Rebellion was swiftly suppressed and Hideyoshi compensated the Nanbu for the loss of Tsugaru with the addition of the districts of Hienuki and Waga as compensation. Nanbu Nobunao relocated his seat from Sannohe Castle to the more central location of Morioka, and began work on Morioka Castle and its surrounding castle town in 1592.

== Edo period ==
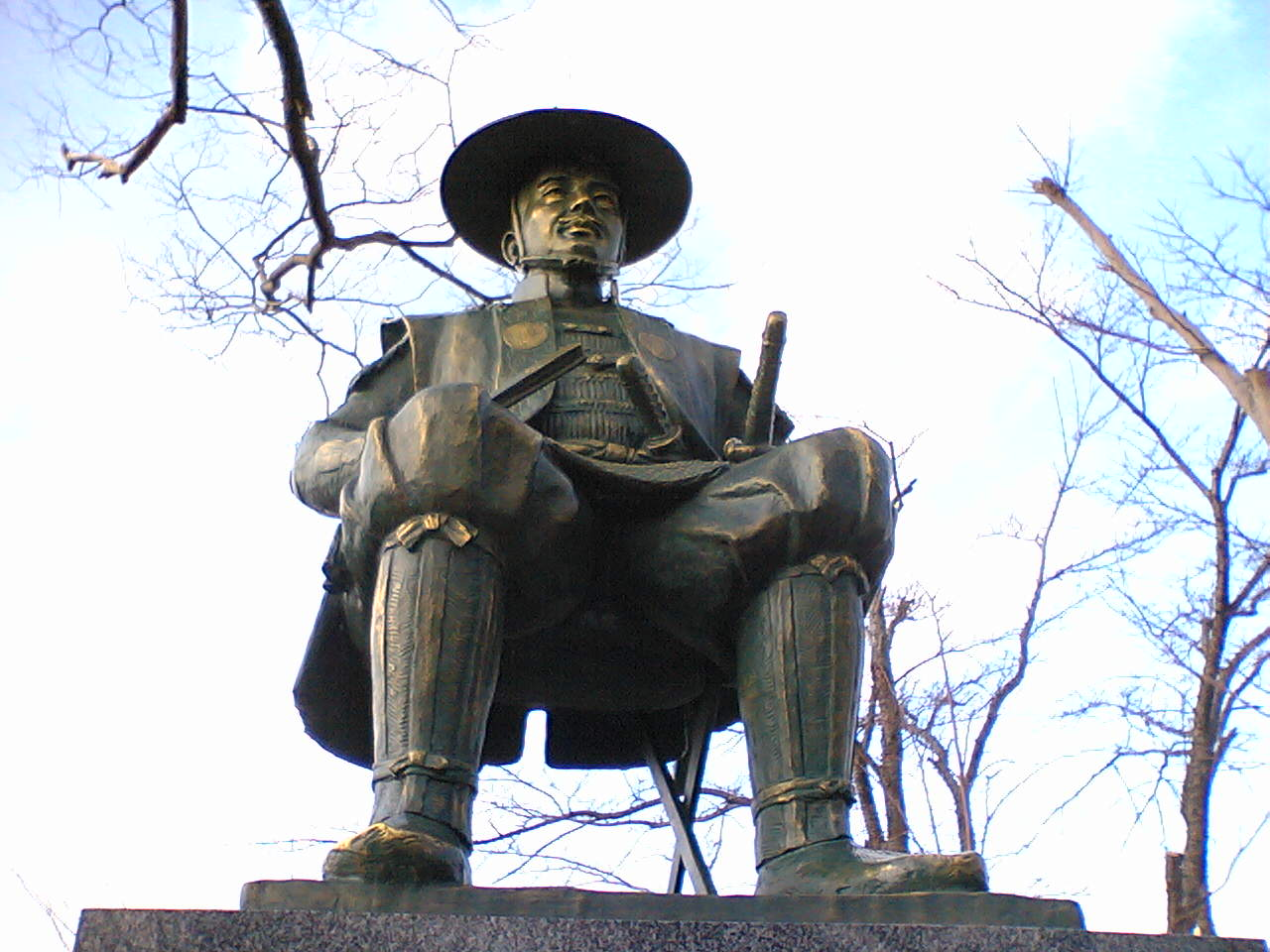
Nanbu Naofusa, first lord of Hachinohe

The Nanbu clan sided with Tokugawa Ieyasu's Eastern Army during the Battle of Sekigahara. In the wake of Ieyasu's victory, the Nanbu clan was confirmed in its lordship of Morioka Domain (盛岡藩, Morioka-han) (also known as the Nanbu Domain (南部藩, Nanbu-han)). The kokudaka of the domain was officially 100,000 koku, but later in the Edo era, was doubled in amount. The Nanbu clan retained its holdings for the entirety of the Edo period, surviving until the Meiji Restoration. During the Edo period, two new branches of the Nanbu clan were founded, one at Hachinohe, and the other one at Shichinohe. In 1821, the old tensions between the Nanbu and Tsugaru flared once more, in the wake of the Sōma Daisaku Incident (相馬大作事件, Sōma Daisaku jiken), a foiled plot by Sōma Daisaku, a former retainer of the Nanbu clan, to assassinate the Tsugaru lord. The Nanbu clan's territories were also among those effected by the Tenpō famine of the mid-1830s.

As with many other domains of northern Honshū, the Morioka Domain was assigned by the shogunate to policing portions of the frontier region of Ezochi (now Hokkaido). The clan's first direct encounter with foreigners came in the late 16th century, when a Dutch ship, the Breskens, arrived in Nanbu territory. A shore party from the ship was captured by local authorities and taken to Edo.

Over the course of its history particularly in the Edo period, there were several retainers of the Nanbu clan who became famous on a national scale. Sasaki Toyoju was a temperance worker, feminist and anti-prostitution activist. Narayama Sado, a clan elder (karō) who was active during the Boshin War, was one of them; he was responsible for leading the Nanbu clan's political activity and interaction with neighboring domains. Hara Takashi, who later became Prime Minister of Japan, was another. Some 20th-century figures in Japanese politics also came from families of former Nanbu retainers; perhaps the most well known of which was Seishirō Itagaki and Hideki Tōjō.

=== Boshin War ===
During the Boshin War of 1868–69, the Nanbu clan initially attempted to remain neutral. However, under the leadership of Nanbu Toshihisa and the karō Narayama Sado, the Nanbu clan later sided with the Ōuetsu Reppan Dōmei. On September 23, 1868, the Nanbu clan's troops joined in the attack on the Akita Domain, which had seceded from the alliance and sided with the imperial government. By October 7, Nanbu troops took Ōdate, one of the Akita Domain's castles. However, due to the collapse of the alliance, the Nanbu clan surrendered to the imperial army on October 29, 1868. After the war, the Nanbu clan's holdings were drastically reduced by the imperial government as punishment for siding with the northern alliance. While Hachinohe and Shichinohe Domains survived intact, a large area of what is now northeastern Aomori Prefecture was given as a resettlement zone for former samurai of Aizu Domain. The Nanbu were also briefly expelled from Morioka itself, and were assigned new lands surrounding the vacant Shiroishi Castle before being allowed to return to Morioka a few months later. Two years after the war, as with all other daimyō, the heads of all three Nanbu branches were relieved of their offices by the abolition of the han system.

== Meiji era and beyond ==
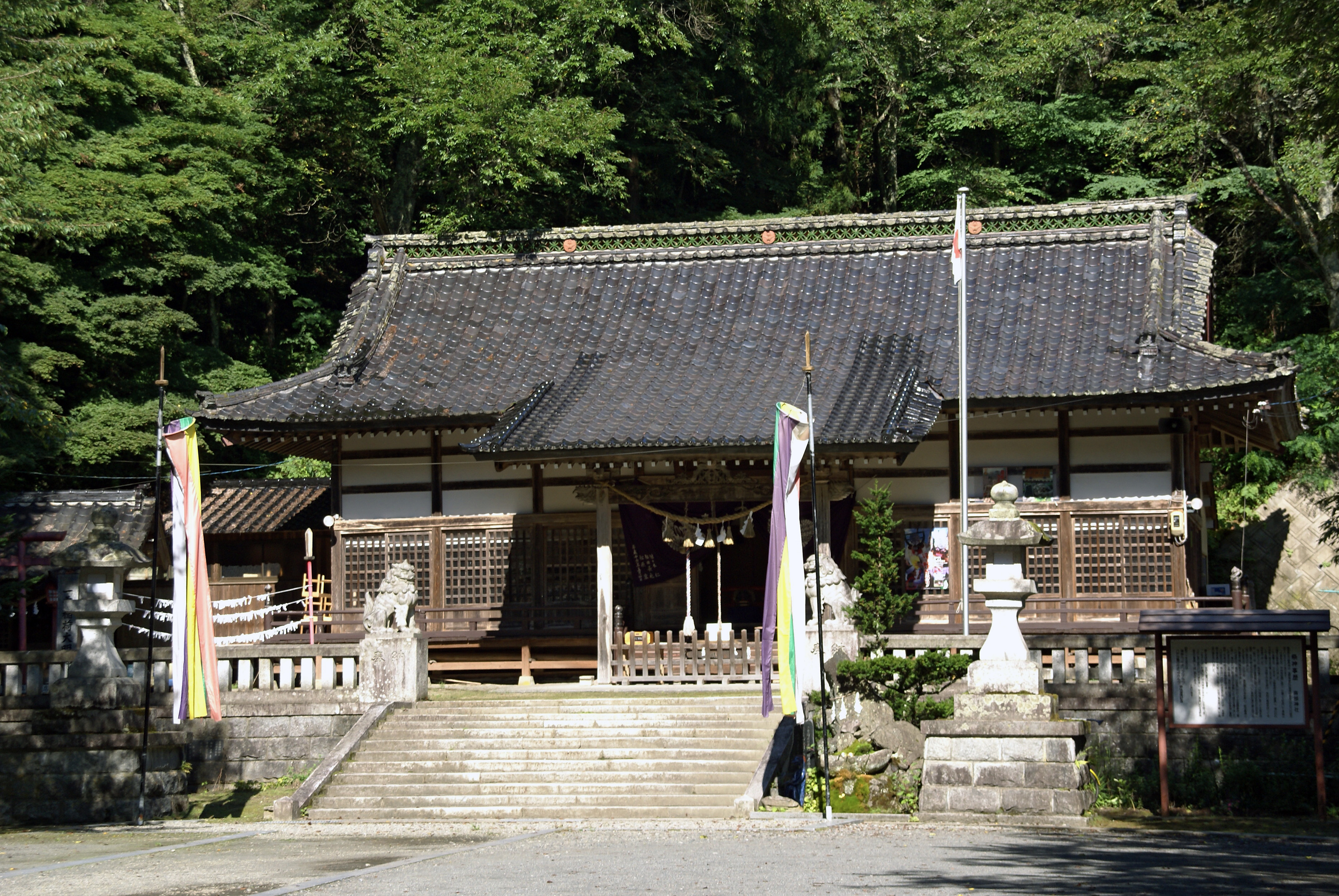
Nanbu Shrine, where the ancestors of the Nanbu clan are enshrined as kami

In the early years of the Meiji era, the main Nanbu line was ennobled with the title of count (伯爵) in the new peerage system. The Nanbu of Hachinohe and Shichinohe were also ennobled with the title of viscount (子爵). Count Toshinaga Nanbu, the 42nd generation Nanbu clan chieftain, was an officer of the Imperial Japanese Army, he died in battle during the Russo-Japanese War. He was succeeded by his brother Nanbu Toshiatsu; Toshiatsu was a proponent of the arts and studied painting under Kuroda Seiki. As Toshiatsu's presumptive heir Toshisada died at age 18, Toshiatsu adopted Toshihide Ichijō, his son-in-law, as his heir. Toshihide was the son of Duke Ichijō Saneteru, who was a former court noble. Upon adoption, Toshihide assumed the Nanbu name, and after Toshiatsu's death, became 44th generation Nanbu clan chieftain. His wife was Mizuko Nanbu, a prominent figure in the Girl Scouts of Japan. After Toshihide's death in 1980, his son Toshiaki became 45th clan chieftain. From 2004 through 2009, Toshiaki served as the chief priest of Yasukuni Shrine. The current and 46th clan chieftain is Toshifumi Nanbu, born in 1970.

== See also ==
- Morioka Domain
- Hachinohe Domain
- Shichinohe Domain
