= Railbus =

Passenger rail vehicle resembling a bus

Railbus
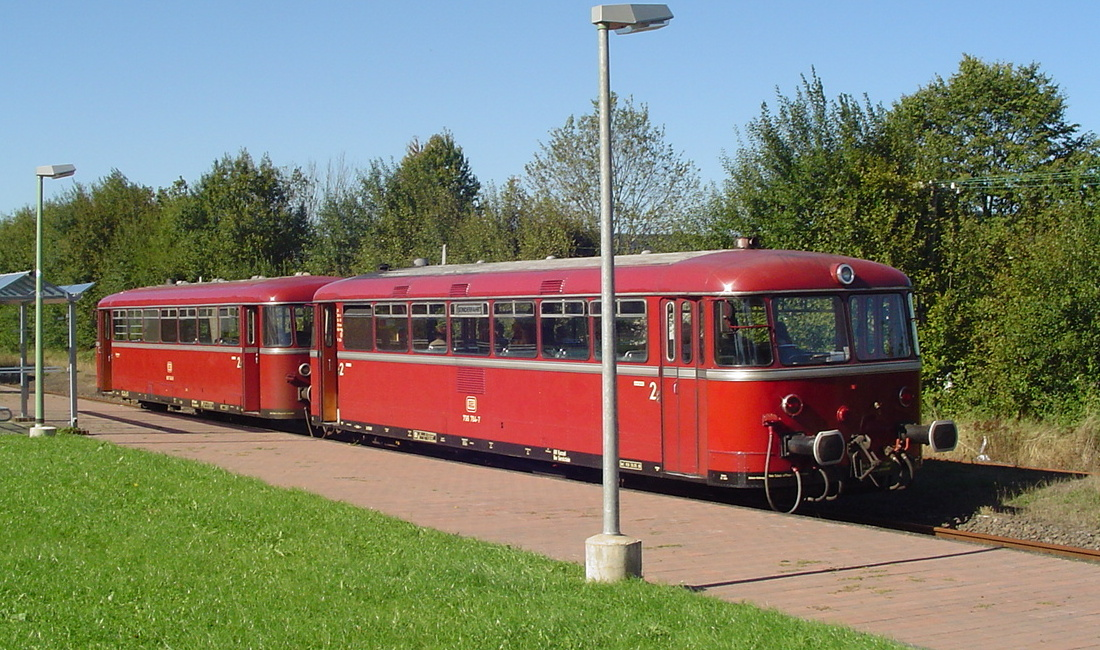
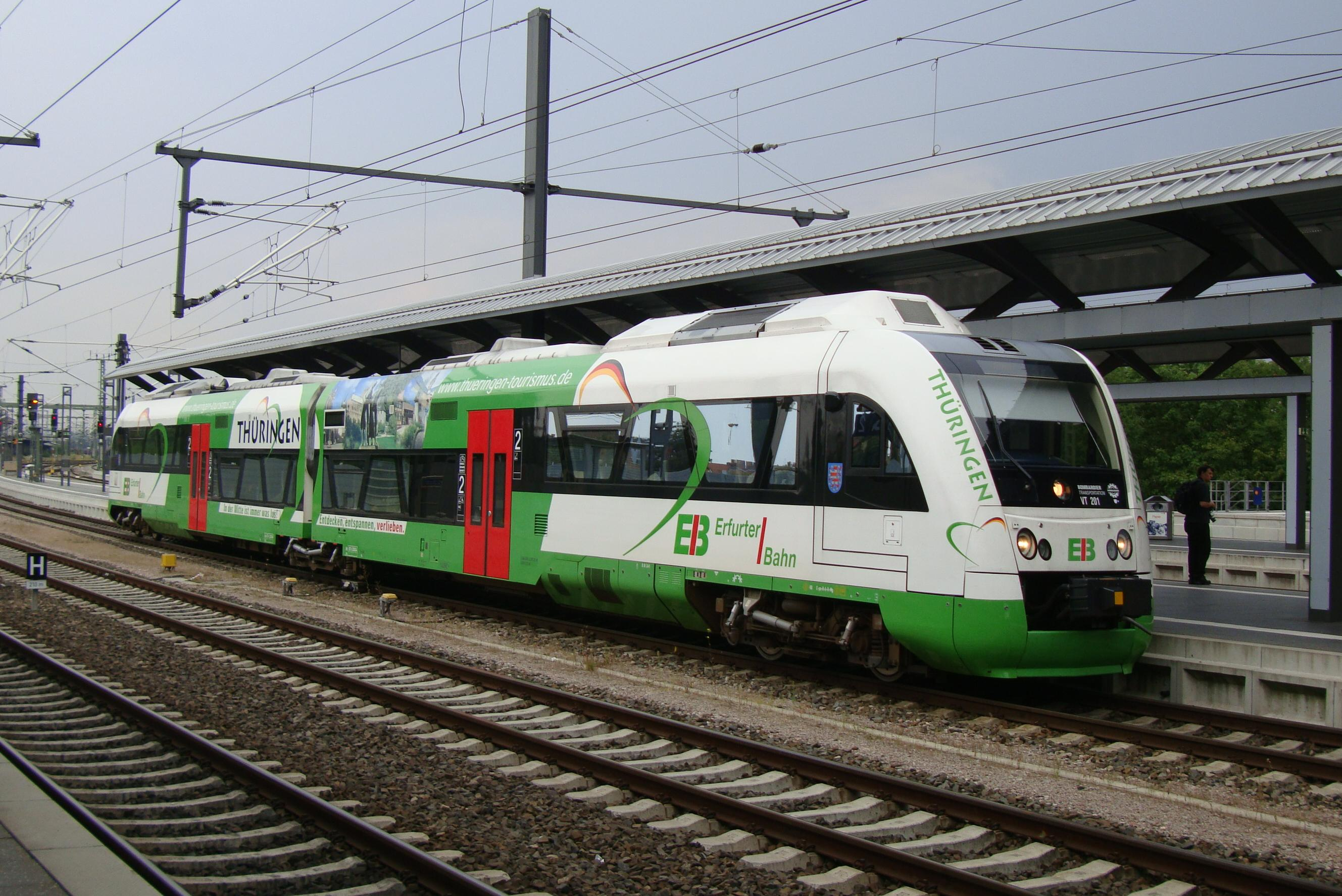
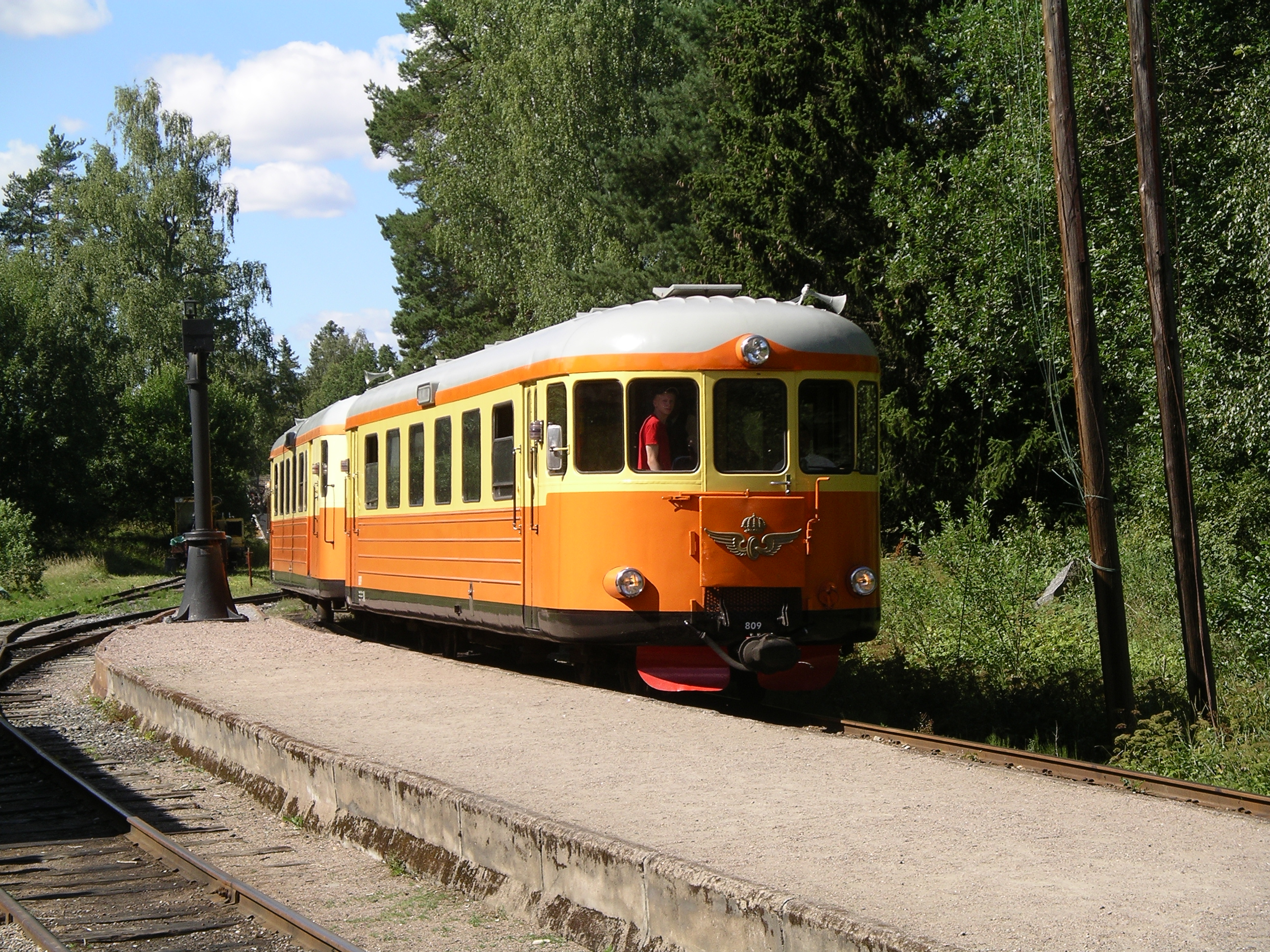
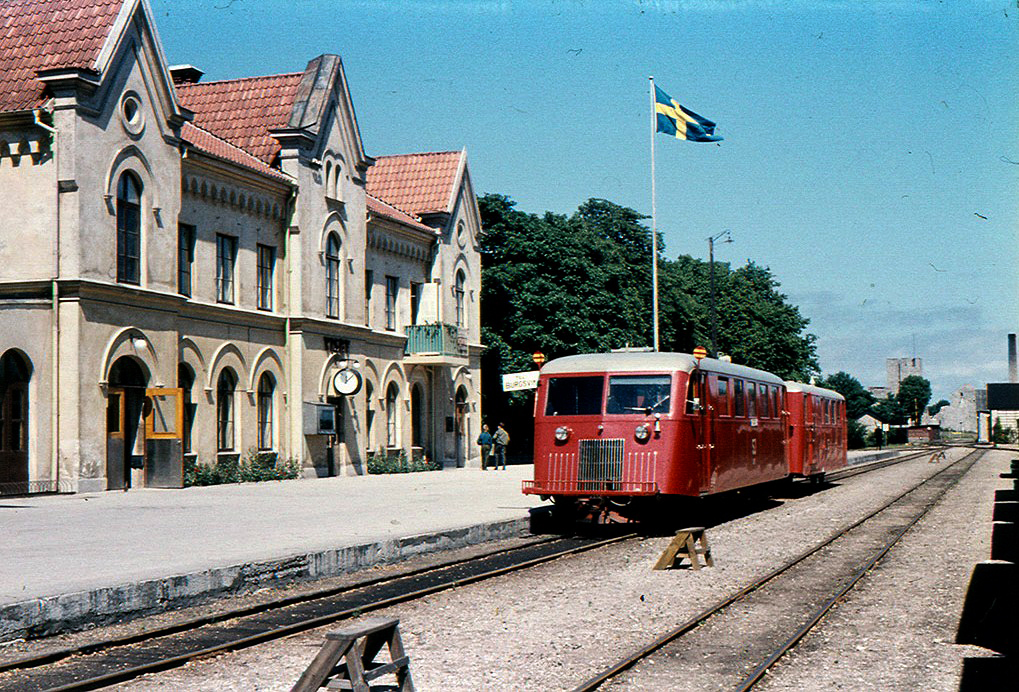
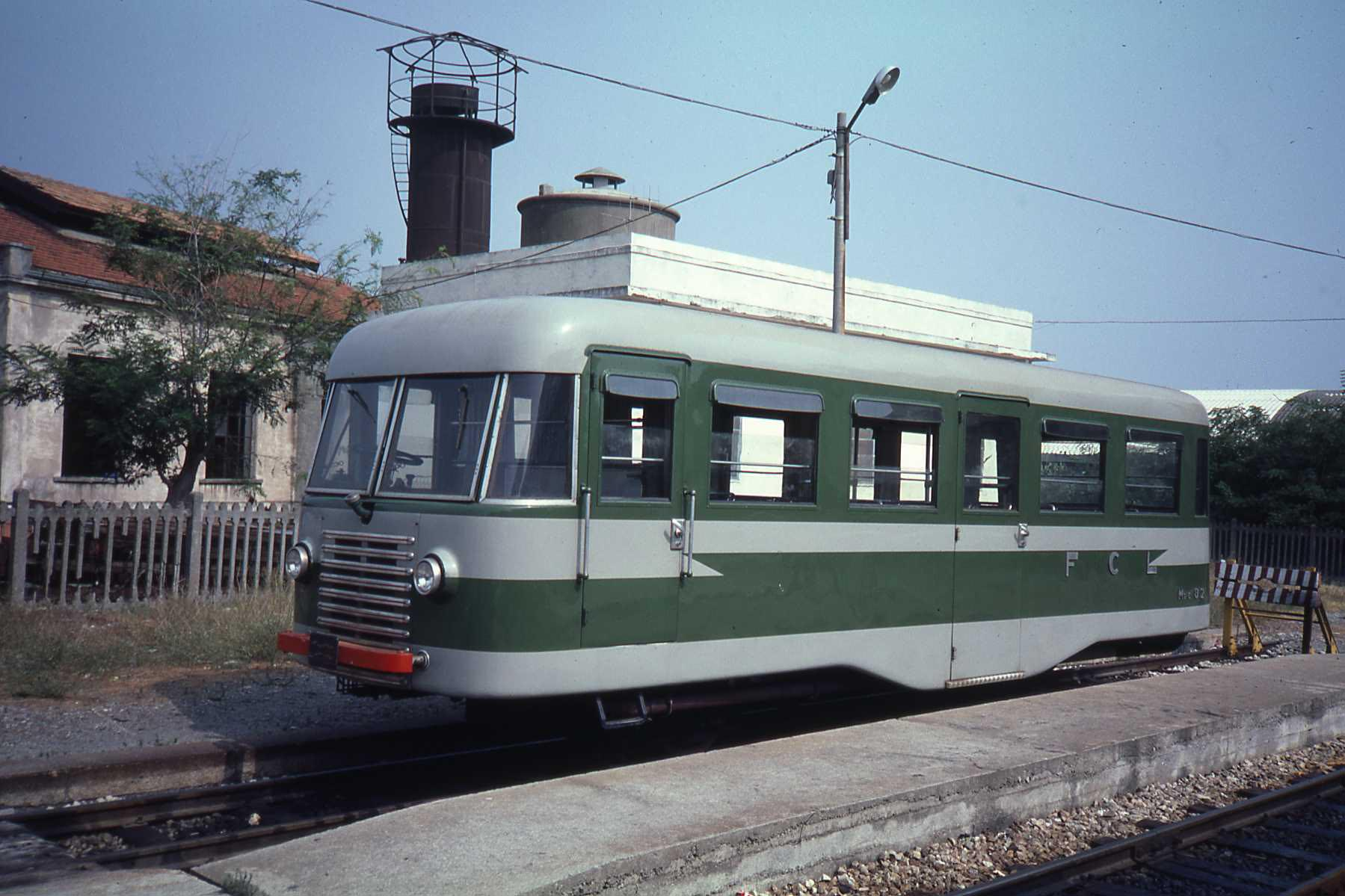
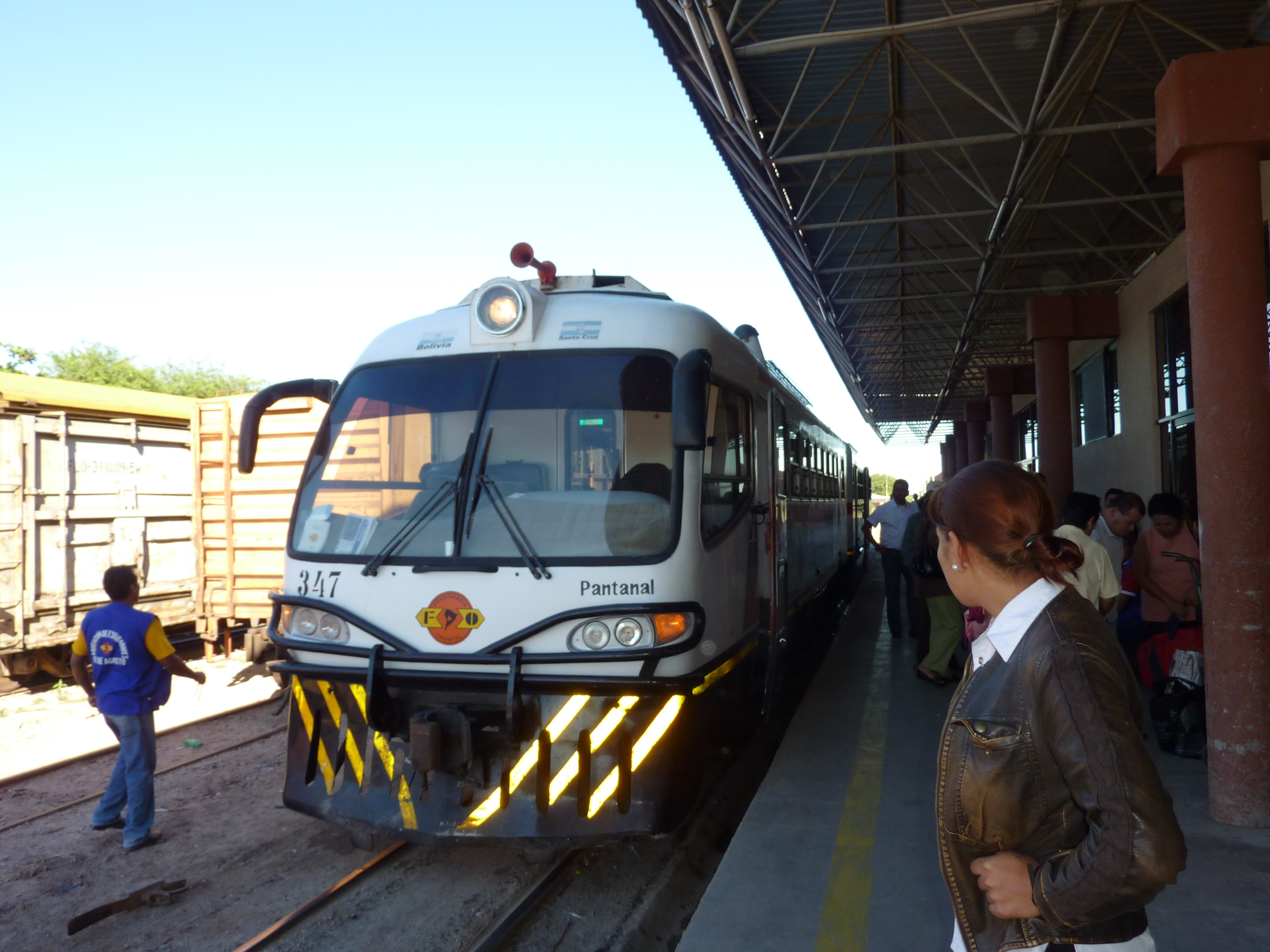
- Upper left: German VT 95
- Upper right: German Bombardier Itino
- Middle left: Swedish SJ YCo5p
- Middle right: Swedish Hilding Carlsson Littera Yp
- Lower left: Italian Calabro Lucane Railway (FCL) Emmina M1c.82
- Lower right: Modern-day railbus, built originally by Ferrostaal, entirely rebuilt and redesigned in Santa Cruz de la Sierra, Bolivia

A railbus is a lightweight railcar for passenger-transport with resemblance to buses. Constructions can share many aspects to buses, and may even have a (original or modified) bus body and wheel axles on a fixed base instead of on bogies.

Originally designed and developed during the 1930s, railbuses have evolved into larger dimensions with characteristics similar in appearance to a light railcar, with the terms railcar and railbus often used interchangeably. Railbuses designed for use specifically on little-used railway lines were commonly employed in countries such as Germany, Italy, France, the United Kingdom, and Sweden. Modern diesel-electric railcars, which can be run coupled as multiple units, like the Stadler RS1, the RegioSprinter of Siemens, or the successor Siemens Desiro, share the role and specifications with railbuses (albeit with improvements in noise, low floor design, fuel efficiency, speed, and other measures), but are usually no longer referred to by the term "railbus".

== Usage by country ==
=== Argentina ===
Locally manufactured TecnoTren railbuses are in use around Argentina, most notably on the University train of La Plata. They are mostly used in rural parts of the country where the tracks have not yet been repaired and so can't handle the weight of regular trains.

=== Australia ===
In 1937, the NSW Department of Railways added six Waddington-built four-wheel streamlined FP Paybuses to serve on small branch lines out of Cowra and Harden that did not have enough passengers to justify a rail motor. Powered by a Ford V8 engine, they were given the designation FP1 to FP6. When the railbus service wasn't popular, several of the buses became mobile pay cars used to pay railway employees at stations and working on tracks.

In December 1941, one of these railbuses (FP 5) was destroyed when dynamite was placed on railway tracks near Yanderra. The three-man crew of the railbus were killed in the explosion. Though £2,000 of loose cash was taken, the safe in the railcar could not be opened by the robbers. No one was prosecuted for the offence.

The first railbus, FP1, has been restored where it is on display at the NSW Rail Museum in Thirlmere. Another seven were built by Comeng in the 1960s.

In Queensland, "RailBus service" refers to road bus service running parallel to portions of some railway lines, substituting for commuter train.

=== Czechoslovakia: Czechia, Slovakia ===
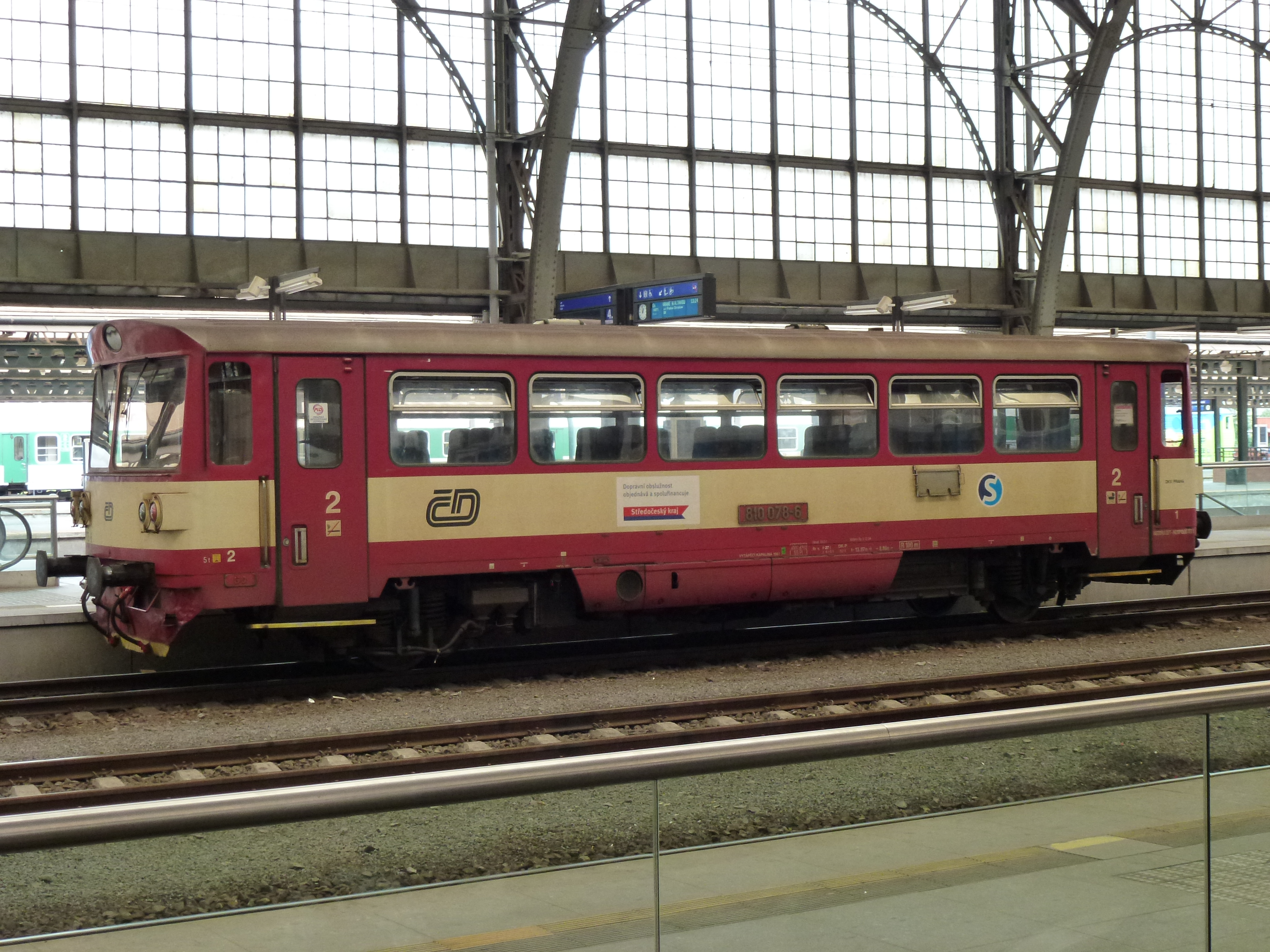
ČD railbus at Prague, 2011

In the Czech Republic and Slovakia, railbuses are used on less frequented rural lines. Most railbuses are based on a former ČSD M 152.0 diesel multiple unit, also known as ČD/ŽSR Class 810.

=== Canada ===
The Tsal'alh Seton Train utilizes a modified International 3300 bus for its daily service between Lillooet and Seton Portage, British Columbia.

=== Germany ===
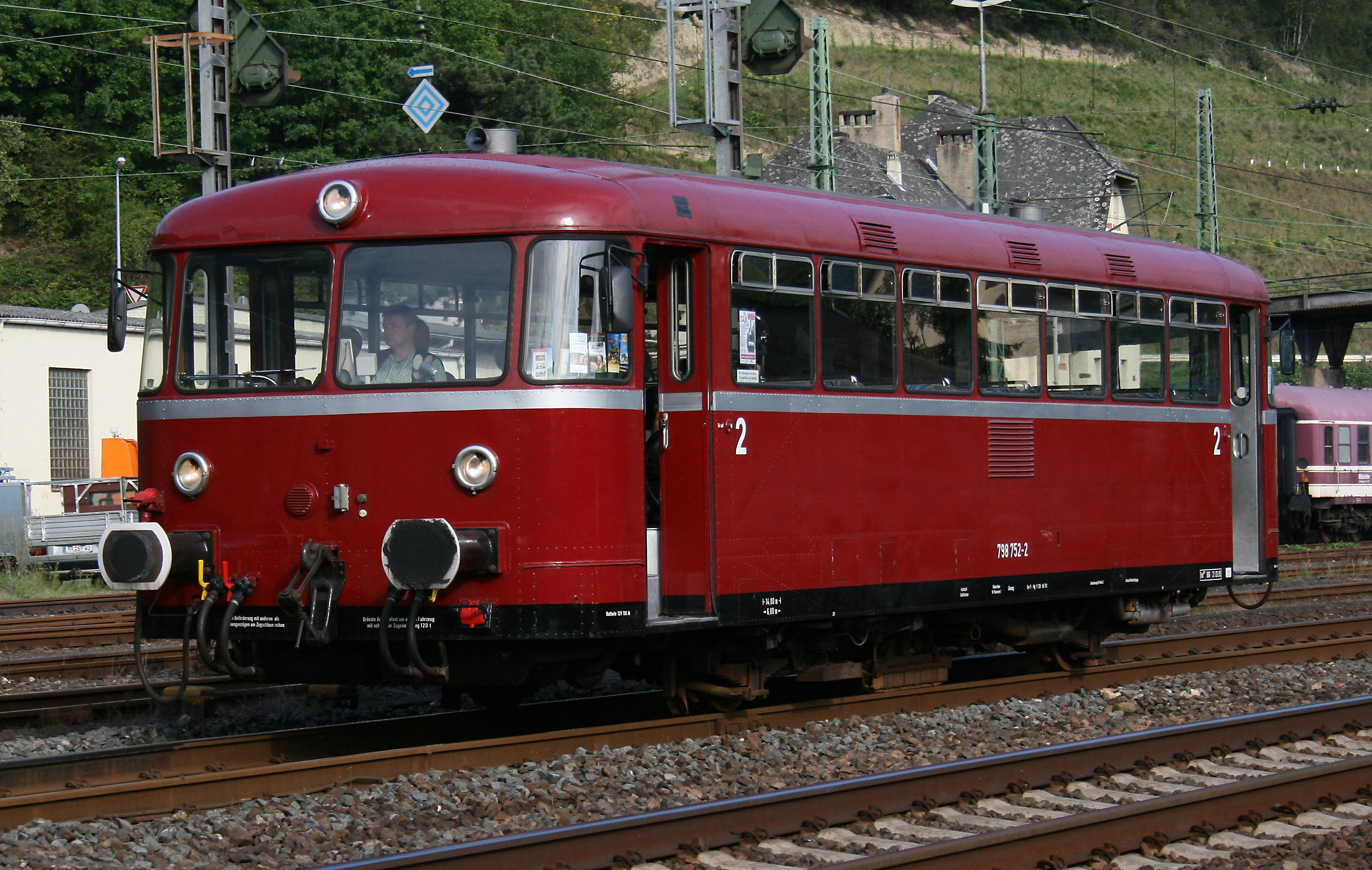
Two-engined Uerdingen railbus of Deutsche Bundesbahn

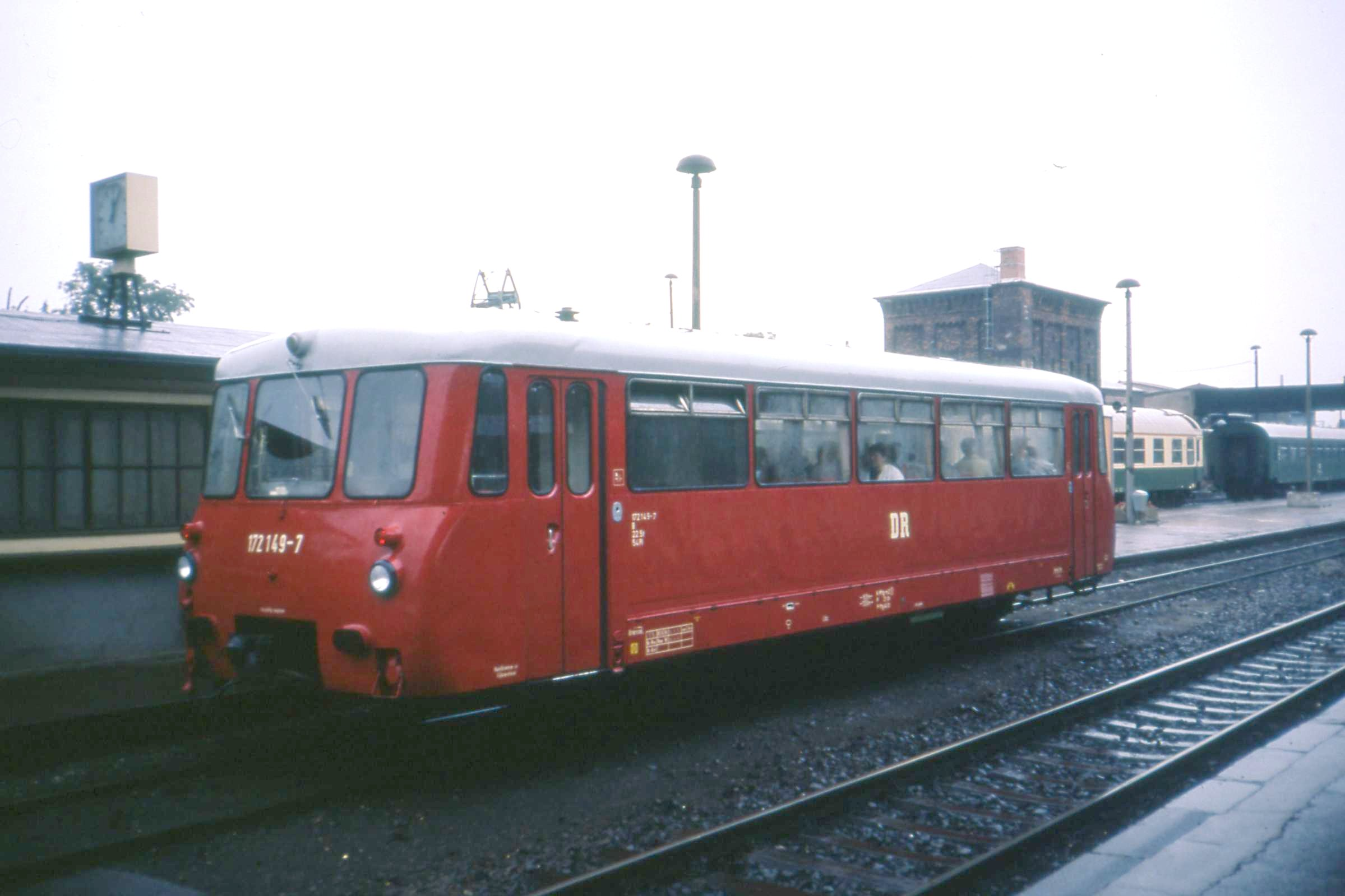
VT 2.09 of Deutsche Reichsbahn

In Germany, the Schienenbus was developed in the 1930s to fulfill the need for an inexpensive rail vehicle. It was built to standard specifications on Germany's Reichsbahn (the predecessor to DB) to meet the demand for cost-effective services on light railways or Kleinbahnen (the Wismar railbus was a pioneer in those days.) After the Second World War, the eventually ubiquitous Uerdingen railbuses were developed by Deutsche Bundesbahn in single-engined and double-engined versions. The latter were powerful enough to haul through coaches and freight cars. Matching trailers and driving trailers were developed as well. These railbuses were a predecessor of the modern diesel multiple units. In the late 1950s, Deutsche Reichsbahn in the GDR developed the single-engined class VT 2.09 with matching trailers and driving trailers, built by Waggonbau Bautzen.

A number of serious accidents in Germany in the late 1970s involving railbuses resulted in the specification and development of larger, more robustly designed diesel railcars. Although these cars were more similar in size to the U.S. produced diesel railcars, they would not have complied with current FRA requirements, and, like their North American cousin rail diesel cars, are largely railroad-derivative designs. The DB Class 628 exemplifies the contemporary German diesel railcar. This type of car replaced the Schienenbus and locomotive-hauled train consists where possible on branch-line and main-line assignments during the 1980s and 1990s. Both the Uerdingen Schienenbus and the Bautzen railbuses have virtually disappeared from regular revenue service, but its diesel rail car successors are still widely used. DMUs of a third generation in succession after the Schienenbus are now being ordered by the hundreds in a variety of modular design combinations. As a curious fact, there is also a double-decker DB Class 670.

=== Hungary ===
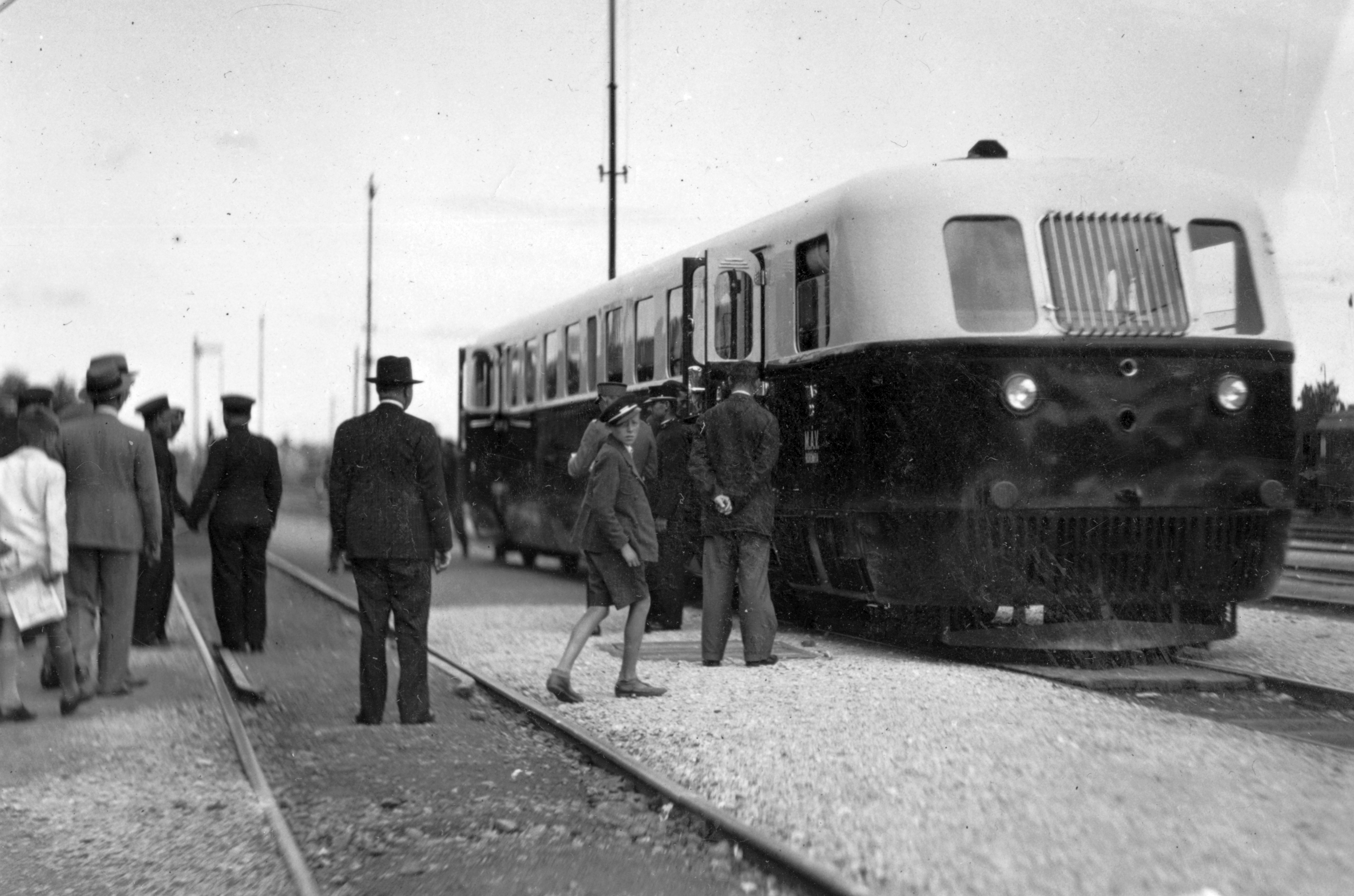
Árpád railbus in 1937

The first railbuses appeared in Hungary in 1925, made by Ganz Works. From 1934, MÁV started to use railbuses called Árpád, which were also manufactured by Ganz. These vehicles ran on the Budapest-Vienna line. In 1975, the last Árpád was scrapped.

In 1986, due to the lack of ČD 810 trains, Ikarus converted an Ikarus 260 bus into a railbus on behalf of MÁV. This model was called Ikarus 725. Its variations 725.01, 722.01 and 723.01 were sent to Malaysia in 1988.

=== India ===
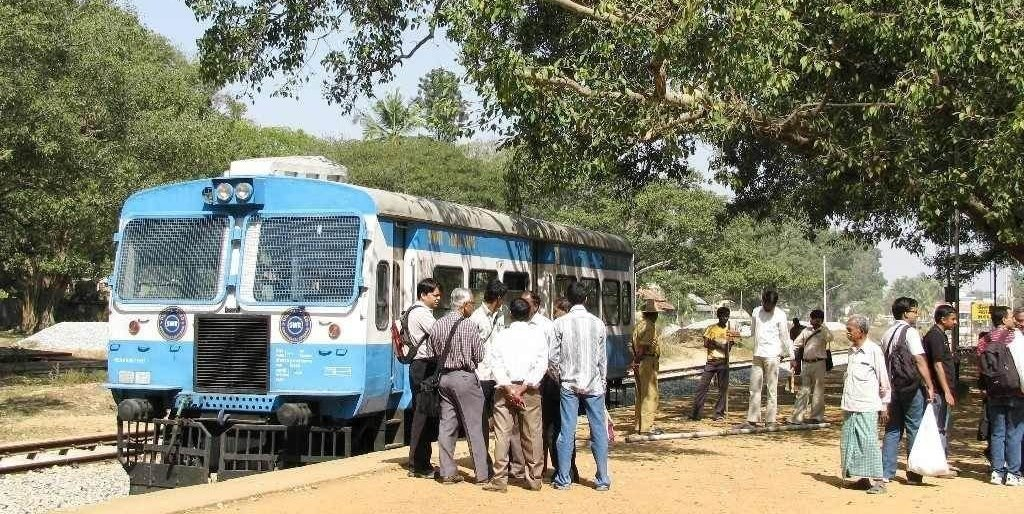
A railbus near Bangarpet (state: Karnataka)

Indian Railways operates many railbuses on its branch lines. These railbuses are being replaced by EMUs due to increase in passengers.

There is railbus on the Kalka-Shimla route (train number 72451), Mathura to Vrindavan (train number 72175) and Merta Jn to Merta City (train number 74804), Khajjidoni - Bagalkot as well, among others.

=== Indonesia ===
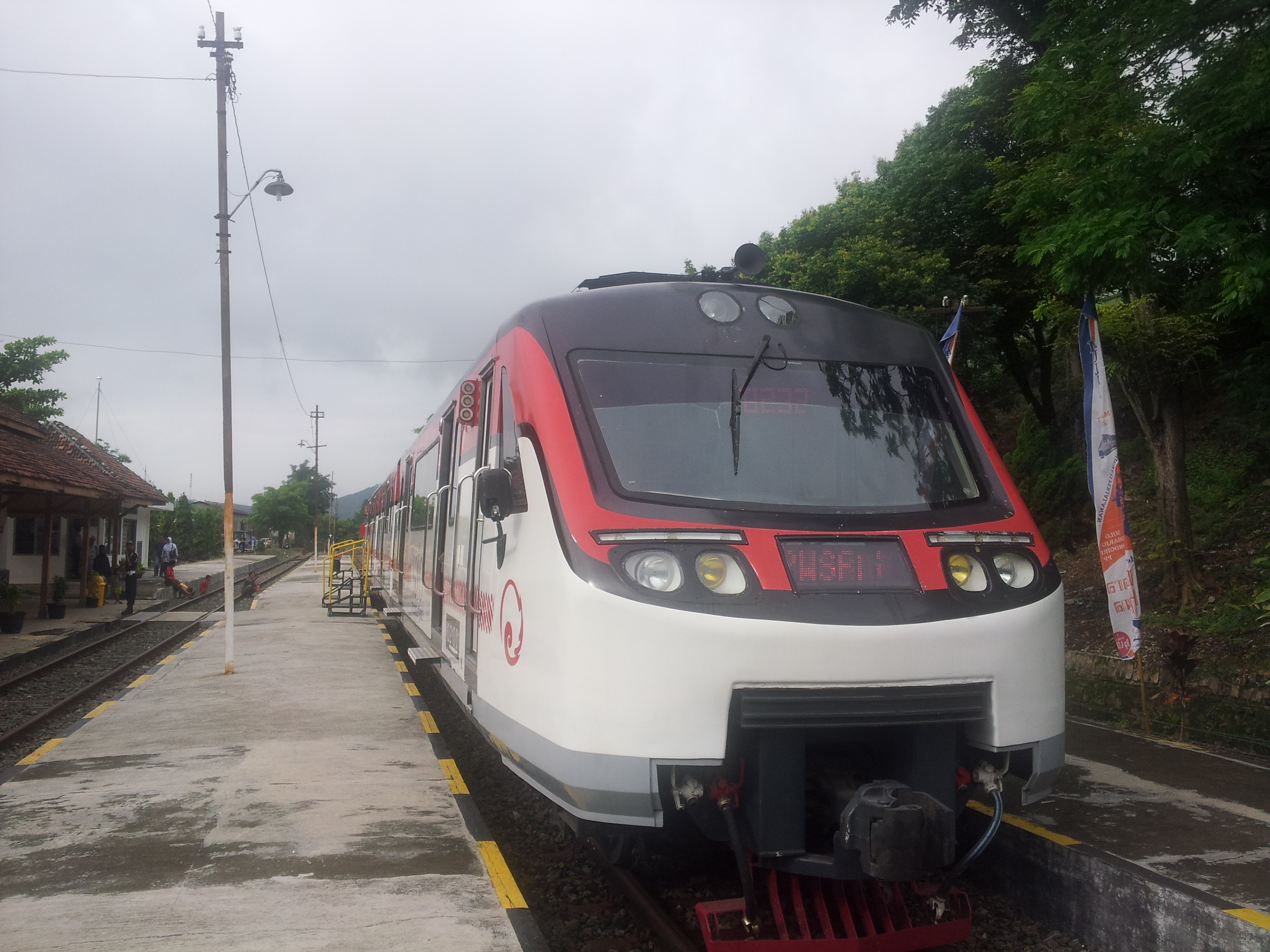
Batara Kresna Railbus

Kereta api Kuda Putih is the first railbus in Indonesia made by Ferrostaal operated in 1963.

Now, railbuses in Indonesia are built locally by INKA and used in several local rail services operated by PT Kereta Api Indonesia (KAI).

On August 5, 2012, the first railbus service in the country Batara Kresna railbus was launched to accommodate parts of Prambanan Ekspres commuter rail passengers in Central Java from Purwosari Station in Solo to Wonogiri Station in Wonogiri and vice versa.

In 2014, KAI launched Kertalaya railbus in South Sumatra between Kertapati Station in Palembang to Indralaya Station in Ogan Ilir and vice versa to ease road traffic.

In 2016, Lembah Anai railbus was launched in West Sumatra to serve passengers from Kayu Tanam Station in Padang Pariaman to Minangkabau International Airport.

=== Ireland ===
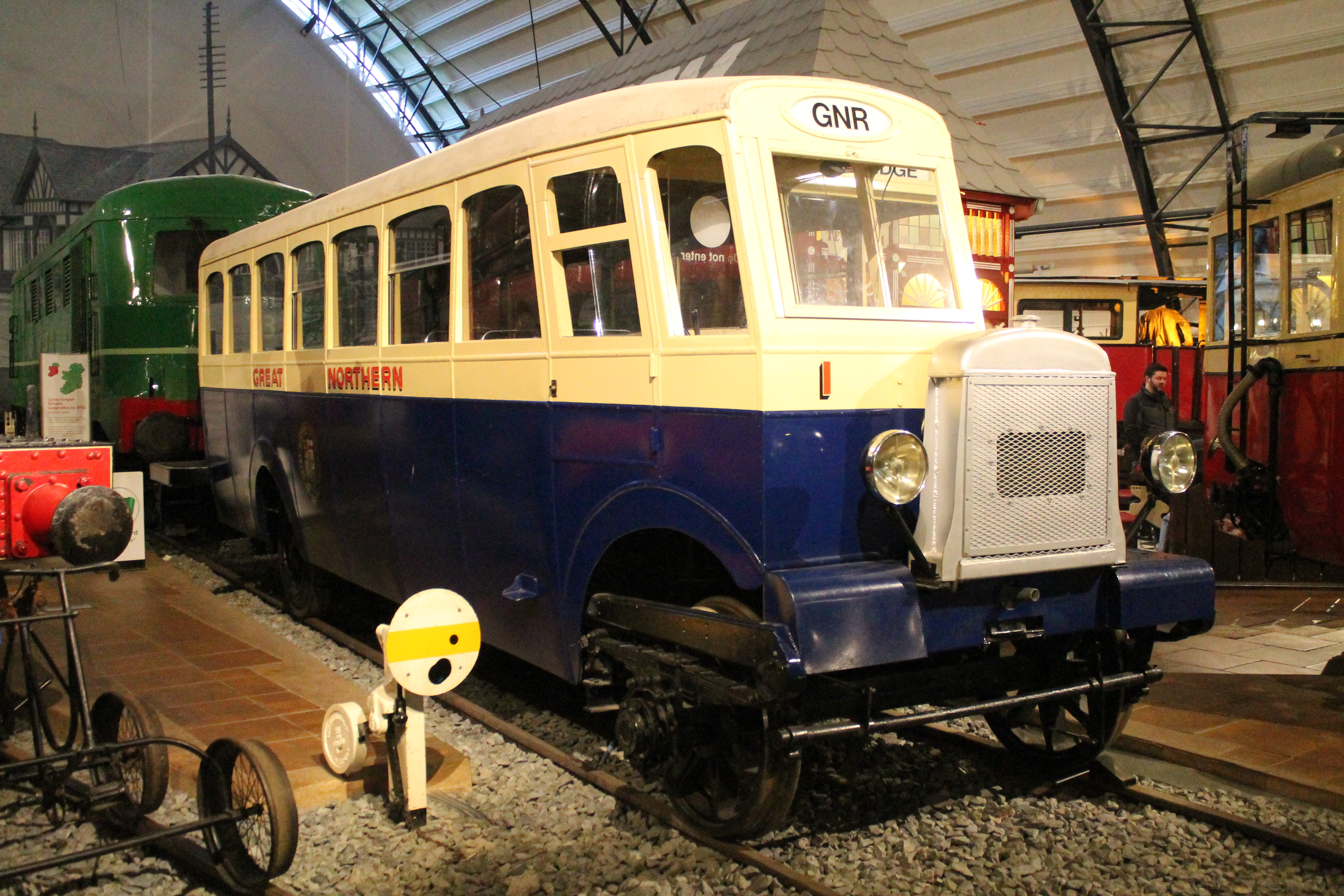
A Great Northern Railway railbus at the Ulster Folk and Transport Museum, 2014

The Great Northern Railway of Ireland produced railbuses at the Railway Works in Dundalk.

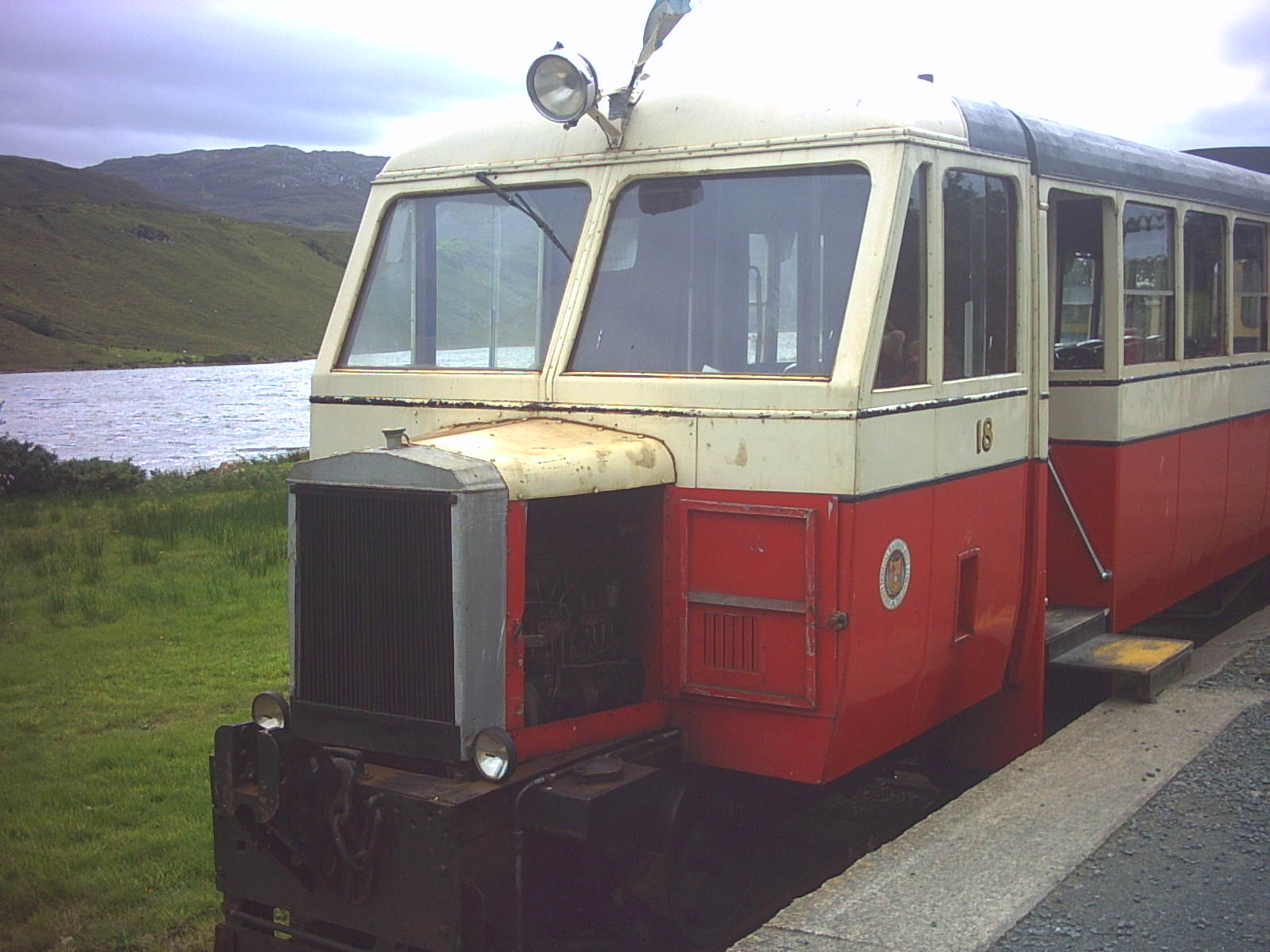
Donegal Railway large railbus

=== Japan ===
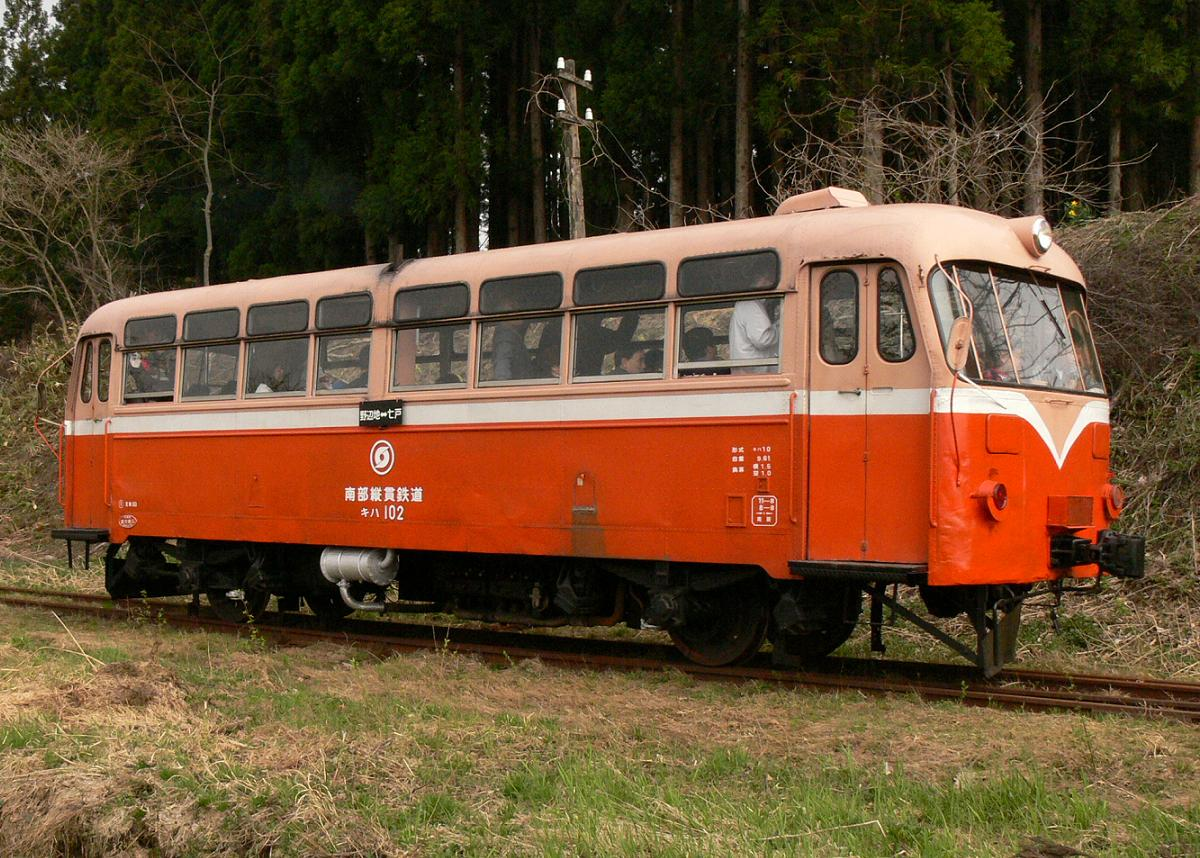
Nanbu Jūkan Railbus Kiha102Th

The president of JNR visited West Germany in 1953 and was introduced to railbusses there. JNR subsequently drew up a plan for railbus introduction plan in JNR, and a prototype was built in 1955. However, JNR found railbuses less reliable in daily operation as compared to standard rail equipment and discontinued their use in the 1960s. Railbuses produced by Fuji Heavy Industries were operational on the Nanbu Jūkan Railway from 1962 until the line ceased operations in 1997, though the preserved units can still be seen at Shichinohe Station.

Motorization soared in Japan from the 1970s on, reducing consuming passenger numbers on local private railways. Fuji Heavy Industries Ltd. in 1982 began development of an "LE-Car" that incorporates significantly the structure of the bus, deficit local lines of JNR has been adopted by many of the railway company that local governments and private companies are operated by joint investment.

=== Mongolia ===
The Ulaanbaatar Railbus is a railbus-based public transit system in the Mongolian capital of Ulaanbaatar.

=== Netherlands ===
Demonstration of the Michelin so-called car-train with rubber tires in the Netherlands in 1932

In the Netherlands, a Michelin car was trialled in 1932.

=== Peru ===
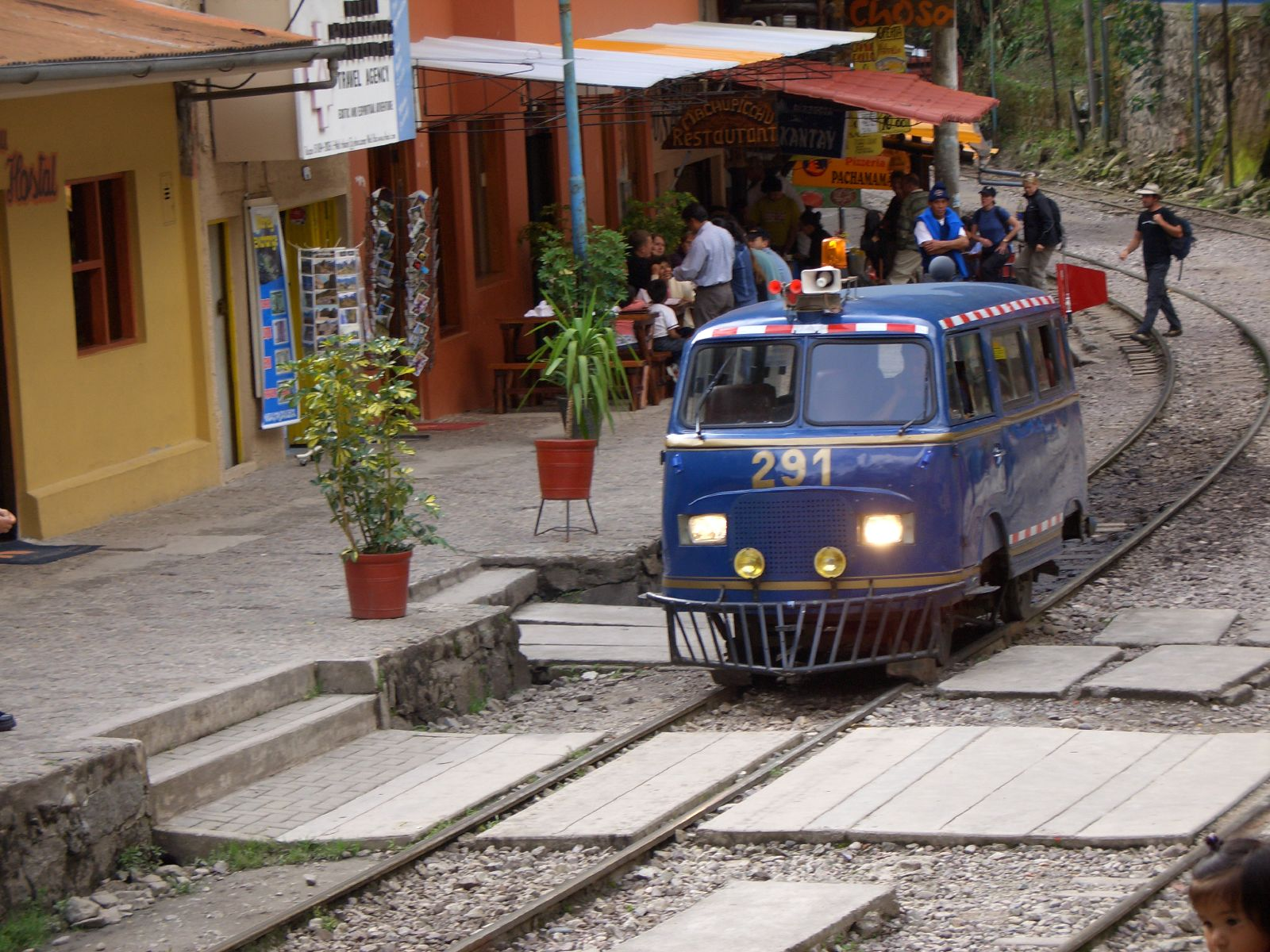
A railbus on the Ferrocarril Santa Ana near Machu Picchu

Railbuses are used on PeruRail.

=== Poland ===
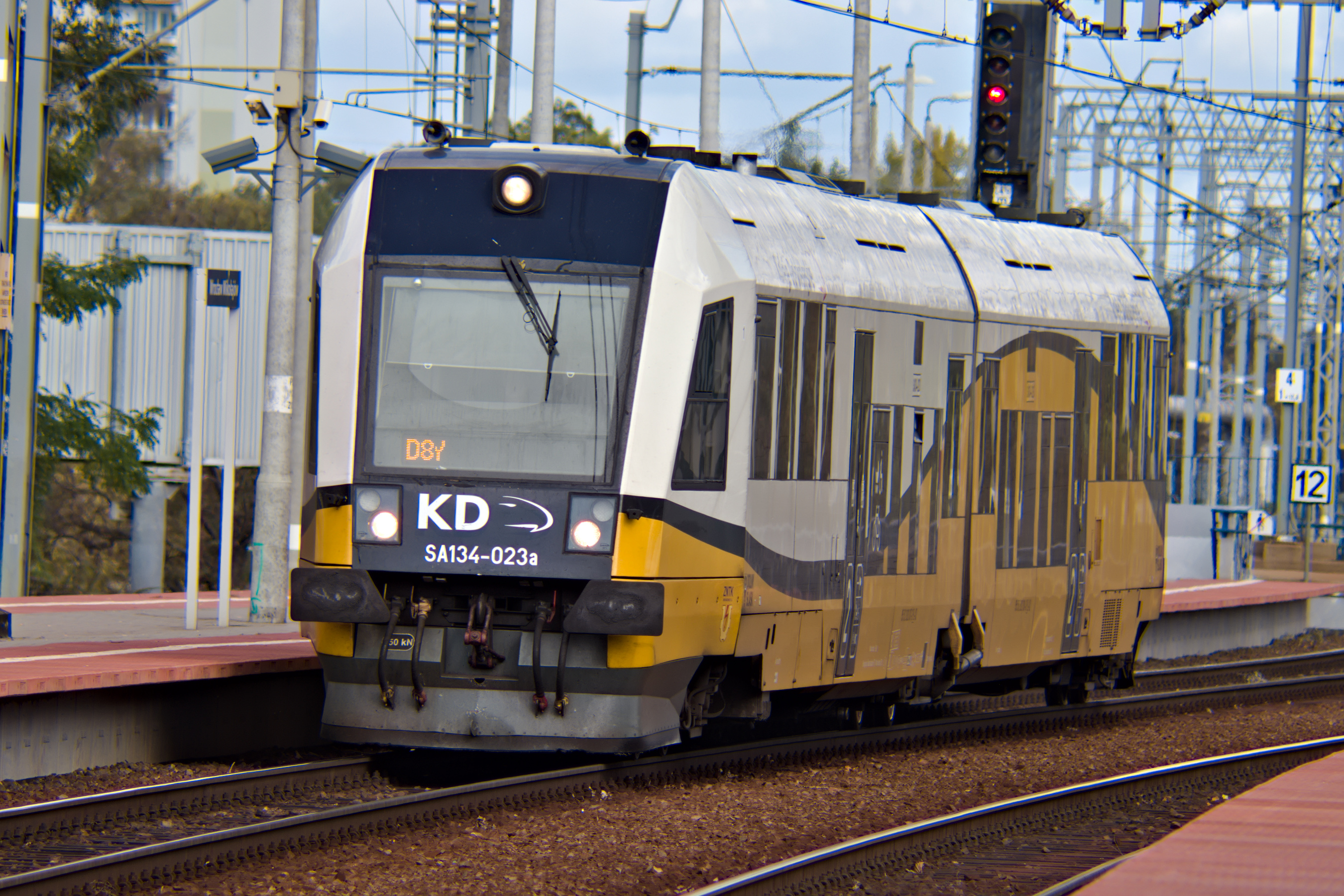
Polish railbus SA134-023 in Wrocław Mikołajów

The railbuses in Poland are commonly used on non electrified branchlines, the first railbus in Poland was built in 2001 classified SA106 built by Pesa in Bydgoszcz. The railbuses proved to be much cheaper to maintain, soon orders from Polregio and other regional railway companies replaced diesel locomotives from service.

=== Saudi Arabia and Syria ===
Syrian railbuses are used in Damascus from Ma'adan to Sarouja, and in Saudi Arabia from Riyadh to Medina and Mecca.

=== Sri Lanka ===
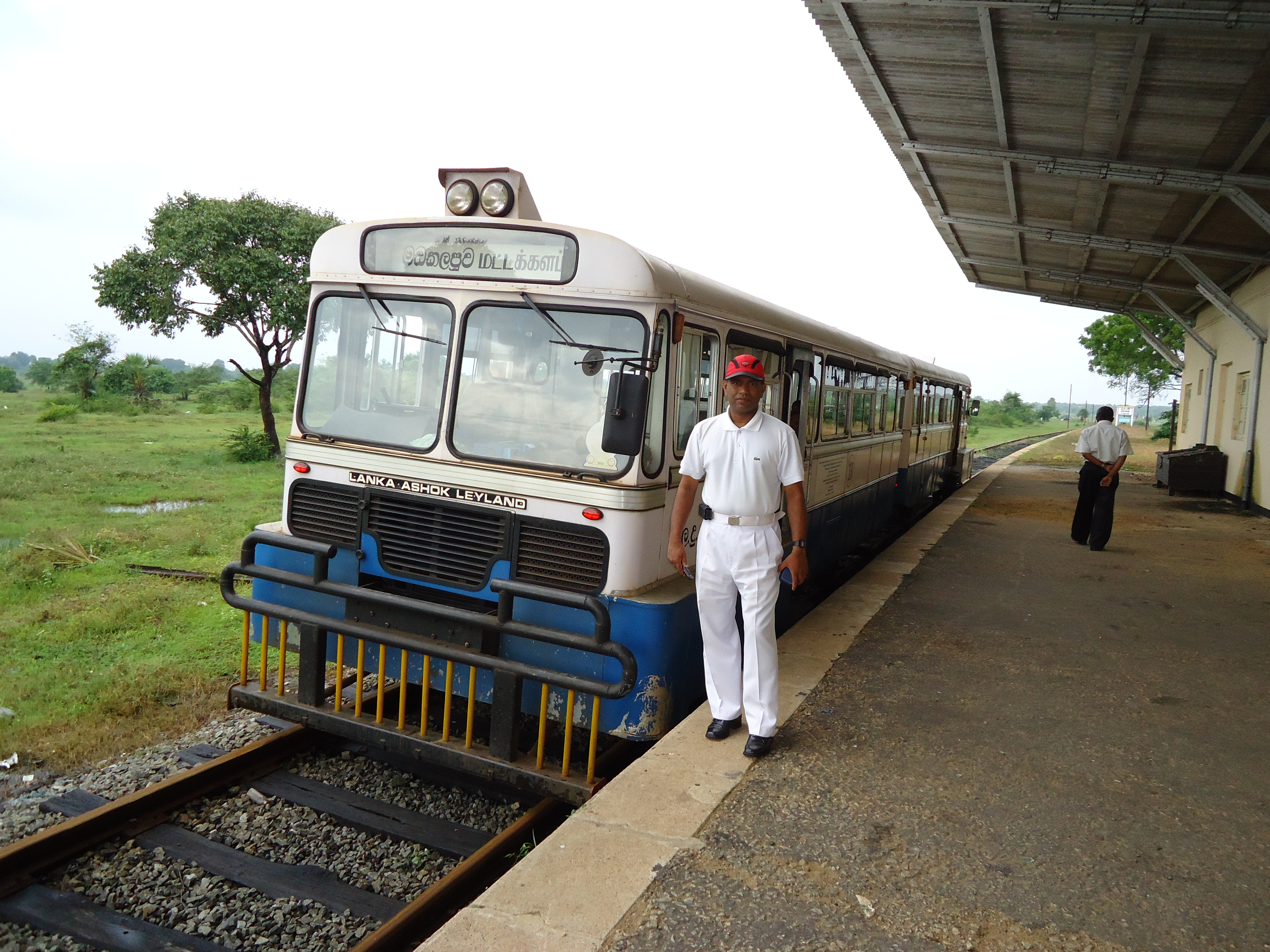
A railbus at Punani railway station, Sri Lanka

Railbuses entered service in Sri Lanka in 1995, using Tata Dimo buses, and later Lanka Ashok Leyland buses. The buses, originally built for road use, were modified to be used on rails and connected back-to-back like a DMU. Railbuses are used in various areas with little passenger demand, including from Kandy to the suburb of Peradeniya and the Kelani Valley line in Colombo. Services where railbuses are used are not indicated on the Sri Lankan Railways website. The route from Maho Junction to Polghawela in North Western Province is also serviced by Lanka Ashok Leyland railbuses.

=== United Kingdom ===
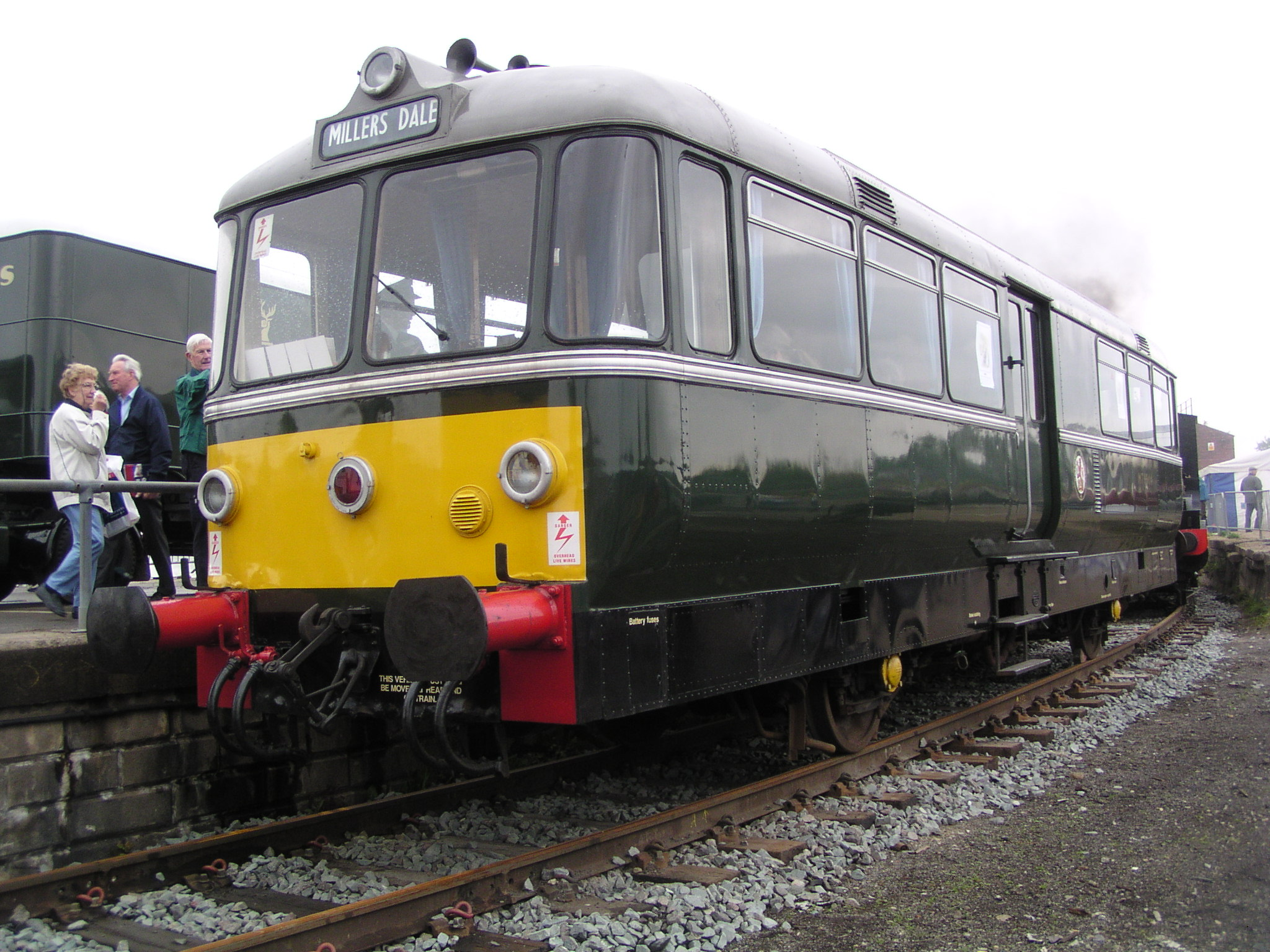
Preserved British Rail railbus built by Waggon und Maschinenbau

British Rail produced a variety of railbuses as a means both of building new rolling stock cheaply, and to provide services on lightly used lines economically.

A variety of railbus known as Pacers, which were constructed in the 1980s, remained in service until 2021, they were phased out as a result of their failure to comply with accessibility requirements.

=== United States ===
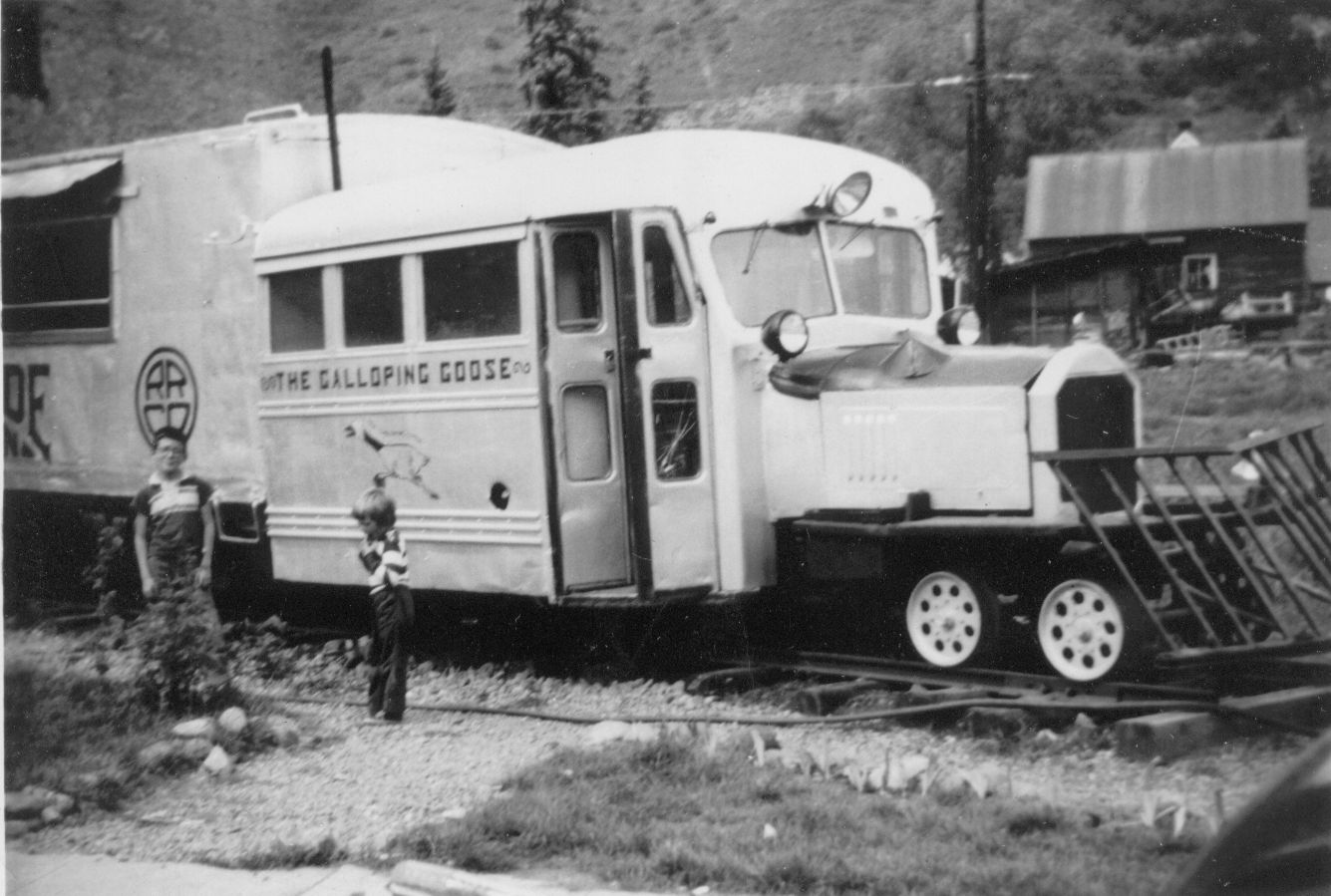
Rio Grande Southern Galloping Goose railbus built on a luxury car chassis

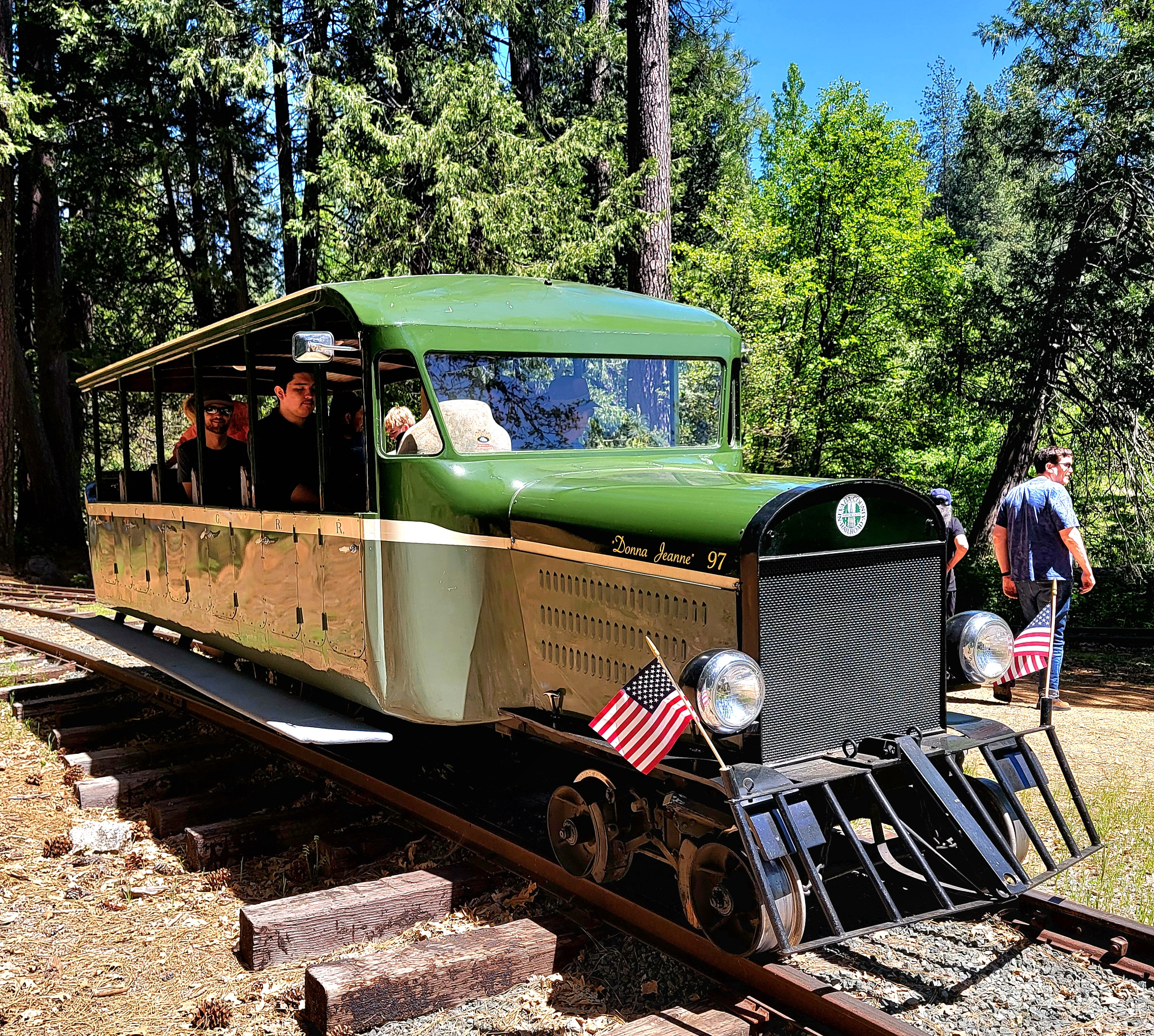
A railbus in operation in 2025 at the Nevada County Narrow Gauge Railroad Museum

There are records of bus bodies being fitted to special Mack Truck chassis built with small four-wheel bogie trucks under the engine and hood, and larger flanged steel drive wheels, as early as 1903. Osgood Bradley Car Company built one of the more popular bodies during the 1920s. Fairbanks-Morse, later a locomotive builder, offered similar conversions fitted to Dodge truck chassis in the mid-1930s, preferring to fit the truck chassis with van bodies and supply a small matching passenger coach trailer. Some railroads built their own bodies on truck or large, powerful luxury passenger car chassis. Most continued the pattern of a small two axle truck in front, and a single drive axle in the rear. One example from the 1930s, built on a White Truck chassis, is preserved at the National Museum of Transportation in Kirkwood, Missouri.

The use of railbuses in the United States allowed railroads in the 1920s to run frequent and reliable passenger service on branch lines for a fraction of the cost of running steam locomotives, allowing some lines to directly compete with road transportation. The railbuses were well-liked by passengers and able to stop and start more easily than dedicated trains.

After World War II a number of more modern light train concepts appeared. Few were successful, as many railroads cooperated with highway bus services to eliminate passenger trains from their branch lines. Some, like the American Car & Foundry Motorailer, blurred the line between railcar and railbus. Others, such as the Mack FCD, landed firmly in the railbus camp. Ten of the Macks were purchased by the New York, New Haven & Hartford Railroad during 1951–1952. By the time they were delivered, however, a new president was in charge, and he had little interest in serving branch lines. Only one saw regular service. All were sold to other entities such as Sperry Rail Service, or to overseas railroads.

In 1967 and 1968, Red Arrow Lines tested a GM New Look bus converted to operate on rails on its interurban routes and the Norristown High Speed Line.

In 1985, SEPTA tested an imported BRE-Leyland railbus on the now-closed Fox Chase to Newton section of the Fox Chase Line.

== See also ==
- Autorail
- Dual-mode vehicle
- Galloping Goose (railcar)
- GHE T 1
- GWR railcars
- McKeen railmotor
- Railcar
- Railmotor
- Rail motor coach
- Road–rail vehicle
