= Nanbu Jūkan Railway =

Defunct railway in Aomori Prefecture, Japan

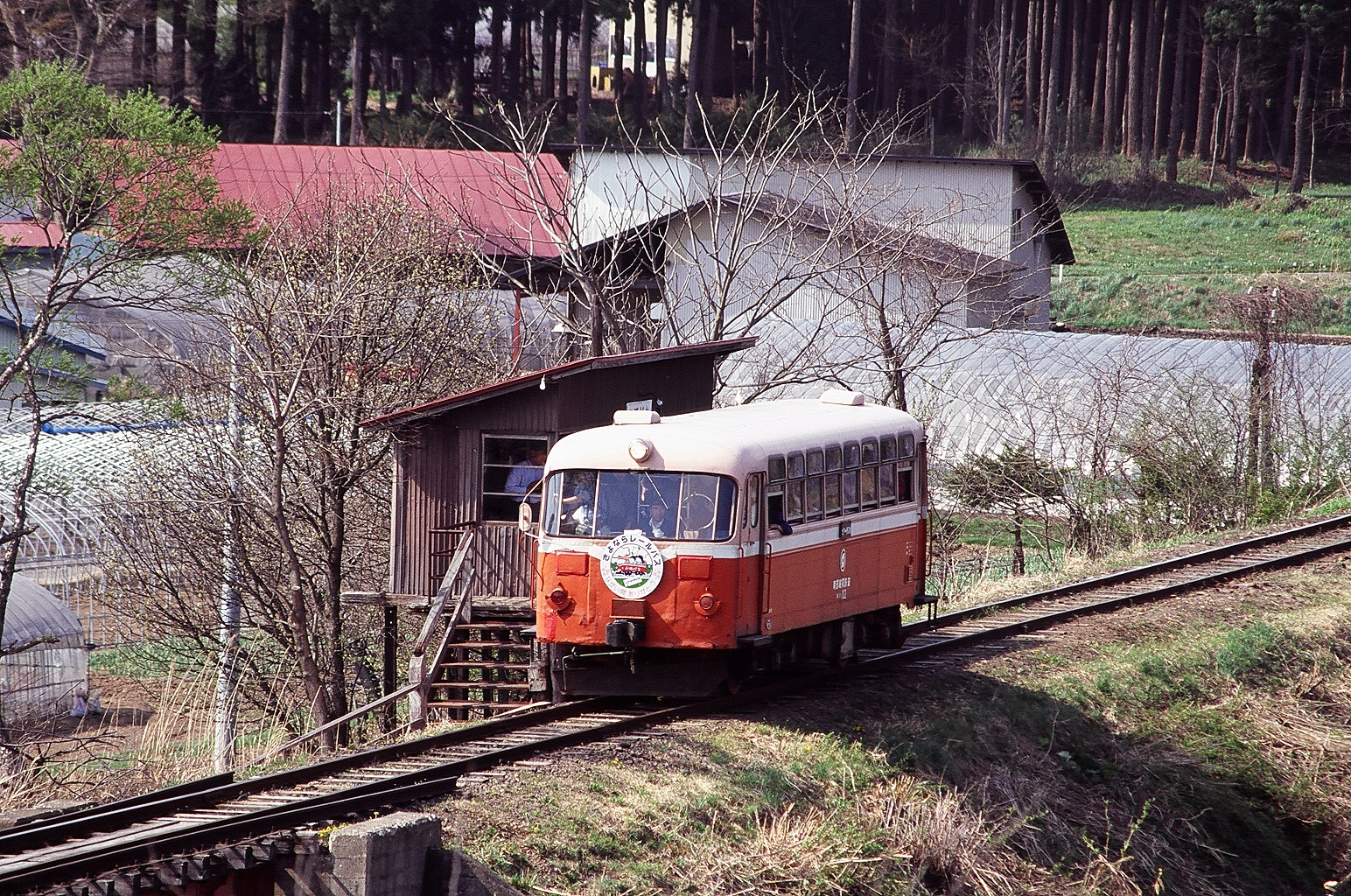
- Nanbu Jūkan Railbus Kiha 102 DMU at Tsubogawa Station in 1997

Overview
- Native name: 南部縦貫鉄道線
- Owner: Nanbu Jūkan Company
- Locale: Aomori Prefecture, Japan
- Termini: Noheji; Shichinohe
- Stations: 11

Service
- Type: Railbus
- Operator(s): Nanbu Jūkan Company
- Rolling stock: KiHa 10 series DMUs

History
- Opened: 1962
- Closed: 1997 (services ended), 2002 (official closure)

Technical
- Line length: 20.9 km (13.0 mi)
- Track gauge: 1,067 mm (3 ft 6 in)
- Electrification: none

The Nanbu Jūkan Railway (南部縦貫鉄道線, Nanbu Jūkan Tetsudō-sen) was a railbus line in eastern Aomori Prefecture, Japan. Services on the railway began 1962 and ceased in 1997 due to financial hardship. It connected Noheji Station in the town of Noheji to Shichinohe Station in the town of Shichinohe.

== Organization ==
The Nanbu Jūkan Railway was operated by the Nanbu Jūkan Company, a privately owned company. The majority of the railway facilities and tracks were owned by the company. The only exception to this was the section of the Tōhoku Main Line between Noheji Station and Nishichibiki Station that was shared between the company and the Japanese National Railways (later East Japan Railway Company (JR East)). The Nanbu Jūkan Railway originally shared the tracks free of charge, but the successor to Japanese National Railways began asking for compensation after that company was re-organized into the various JR companies.

== Station list ==
Station	Japanese	Distance (km)		Transfers	Location
Station	Japanese	Between Stations	Total	Transfers	Location
Noheji	野辺地	-	0.0	Tōhoku Main Line, Ōminato Line	Noheji
Nishichibiki	西千曳	5.6	5.6		Tōhoku
Ushirotai	後平	3.4	9.0		Tenmabayashi
Tsubo	坪	1.5	10.5		Tenmabayashi
Tsubogawa	坪川	1.1	11.6		Tenmabayashi
Michinokami	道ノ上	1.9	13.5		Tenmabayashi
Tenmabayashi	天間林駅	1.0	14.5		Tenmabayashi
Nakano	中野駅	1.1	15.6		Tenmabayashi
Einōdaigakkōmae	営農大学校前	1.6	17.2		Shichinohe
Moritabokujōmae	盛田牧場前	1.2	18.4		Shichinohe
Shichinohe	七戸	2.5	20.9		Shichinohe

== History ==
The Nanbu Jūkan Railway was established in 1962 as a private railway by the Nanbu Jūkan Company in 1962 between Shichinohe and Nishichibiki. At first, its construction was subsidized by the municipal governments it would pass through, but it was ultimately funded by a steel company based in the city of Mutsu. The railway was extended to Noheji via the Tōhoku Main Line on 5 August 1968. The railway fell into financial trouble after many people chose to purchase and drive cars instead of riding the railbus; however the railway hoped that they could serve as connecting railway between the planned Shinkansen station at Shichinohe. Plans for the Tōhoku Shinkansen instead placed Shichinohe-Towada Station to the north of the existing station, away from the Nanbu Jūkan Railway. The private railway served the area until 5 May 1997 when railbus services stopped because of maintenance costs. The division of the company was officially closed on 1 August 2002. Shichinohe Station (now the headquarters of Nanbu Jūkan Company), some of the track and a railbus are preserved. The rest of the rail line has been removed or left in a state of decay.
