= GHE T 1 =

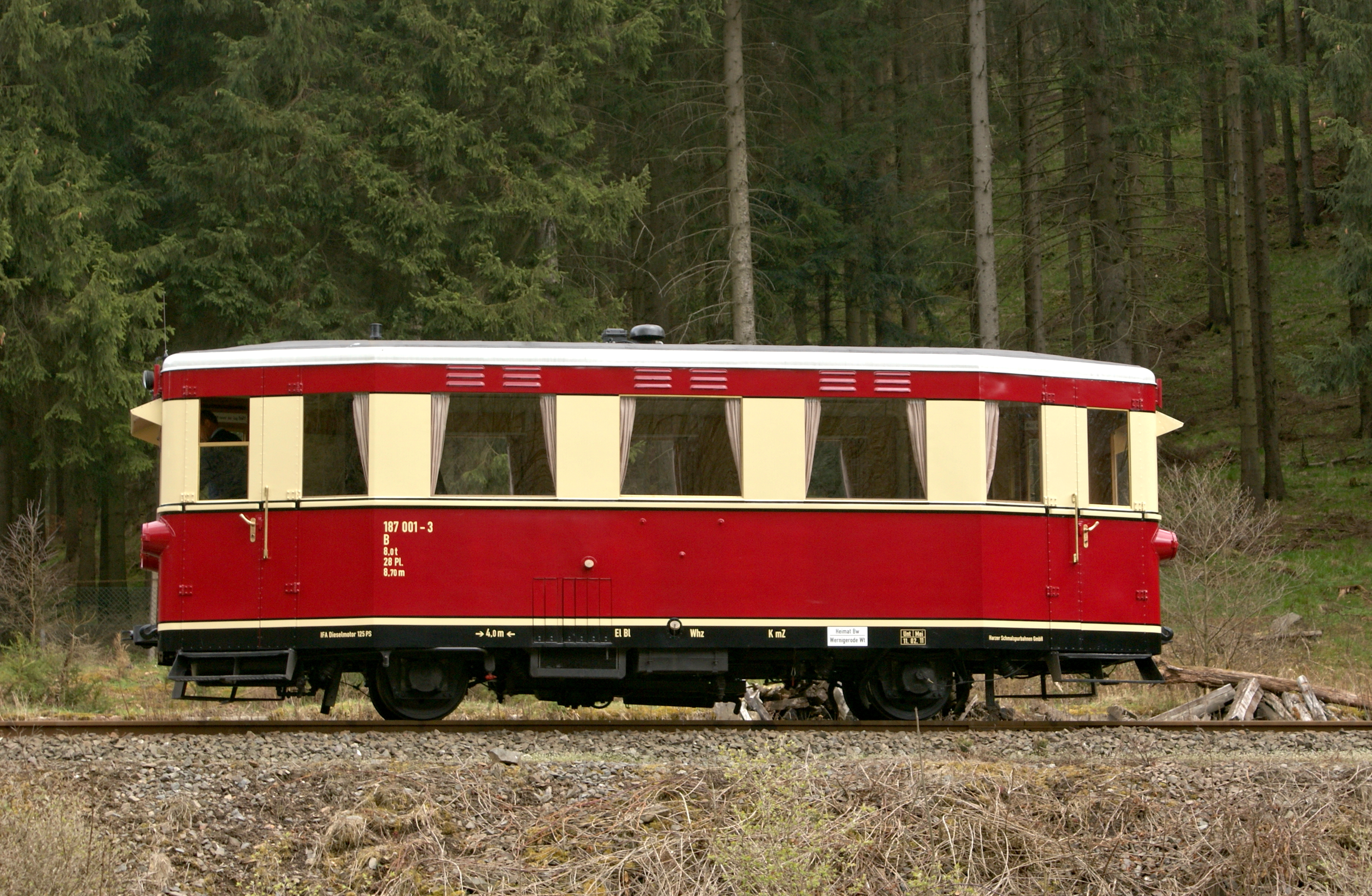
- Manufacturer: Waggonfabrik Dessau (s/n 3046)
- Constructed: 1933
- Number built: 1
- Fleet numbers: GHE T 1; DR VT 137 522; DR/HSB 187 001

Specifications
- Car length: 8,600 mm (28 ft 2 5/8 in) over coupling
- Width: 3,450 mm (11 ft 3 7/8 in)
- Wheel diameter: 700 mm (27.56 in)
- Wheelbase: 4,000 mm (13 ft 1 1/2 in)
- Maximum speed: 40 km/h (25 mph)
- Weight: Empty: 8.0 t (7.9 long tons; 8.8 short tons); Service: 12.0 t (11.8 long tons; 13.2 short tons)
- Prime mover(s): Today: LKW W50 motor
- Power output: Today: 92 kW (123 hp)
- Transmission: Mylius drive
- UIC classification: A1
- Minimum turning radius: 30 m (98.43 ft)
- Braking system(s): Screw brake
- Track gauge: 1,000 mm (3 ft 3 3/8 in)

In 1933 the Gernrode-Harzgerode Railway Company (GHE) bought this twin-axled, narrow gauge railbus from Waggonfabrik Dessau and classified it as GHE T 1 within its vehicle fleet. The vehicle remained a one-off; bus services were more important to the GHE. After the Second World War the railbus remained at Eisfelder Talmühle station and as a result evaded Russian reparation measures. In the time that followed, it was redesignated as VT 133 522, and took over the traffic on the remaining section of the Selke Valley Railway between Eisfelder Talmühle and Hasselfelde. Later it returned to duties on its home line between Gernrode and Straßberg (Harz), but was only used as a tool wagon. With its 34 seats and 10 standing places it was just too small. In 1972 it was given its present-day computerised number of 187 001 by the Deutsche Reichsbahn (GDR) in East Germany. Today the Harz Narrow Gauge Railways uses it exclusively for railway specials.

Currently (2007) the vehicle is stabled as its licence has expired.
