= Shichinohe =

Shichinohe 七戸町
- Town
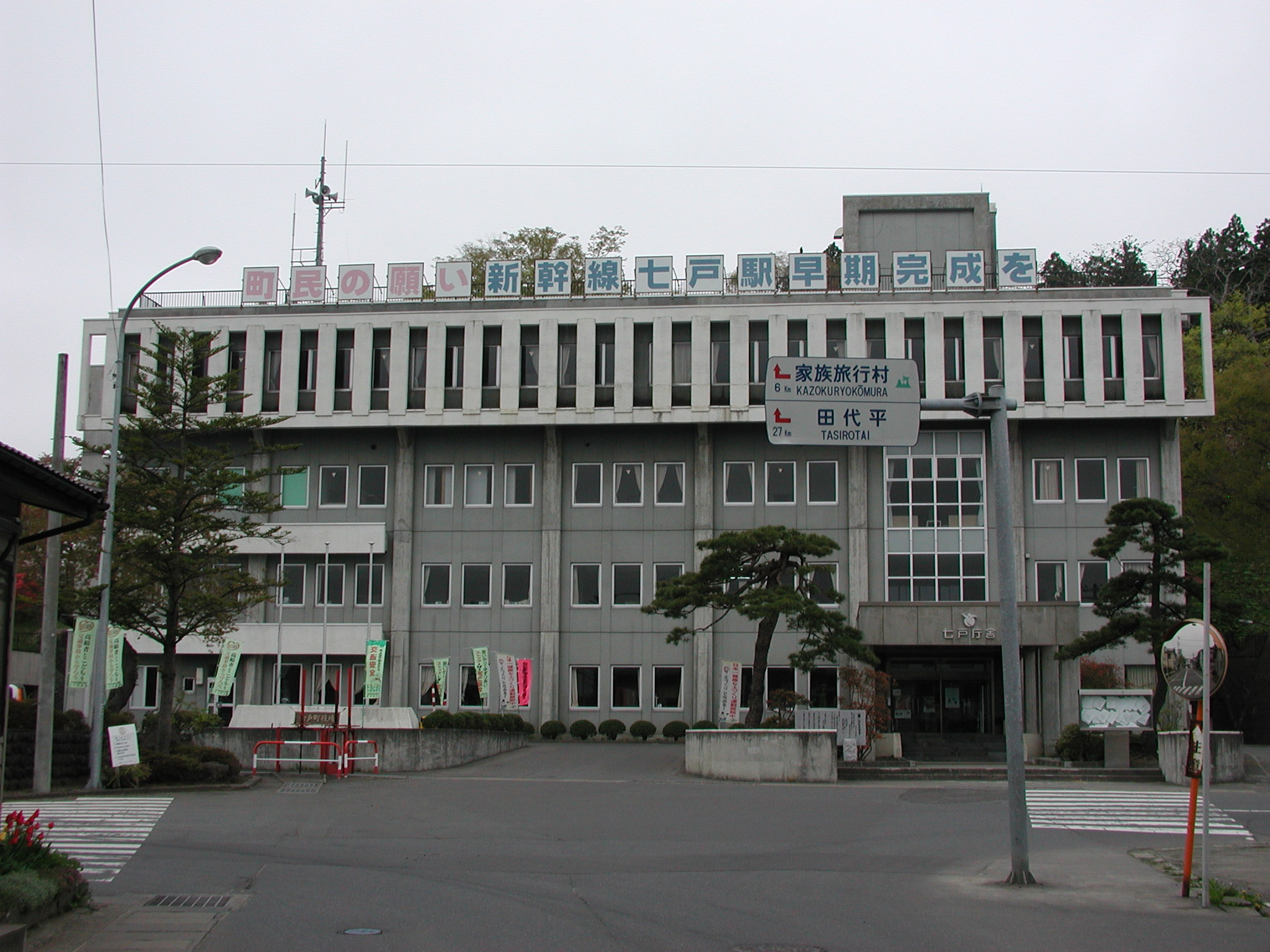
- Shichinohe Town Hall

- Flag Seal
- Location of Shichinohe in Aomori Prefecture

- Coordinates: 40°44′41″N 141°09′29″E
- Country: Japan
- Region: Tōhoku
- Prefecture: Aomori
- District: Kamikita

Area
  - Total: 337.23 km^{2} (130.21 sq mi)

Population (January 1, 2026)
  - Total: 13,671
  - Density: 40.539/km^{2} (105.00/sq mi)
- Time zone: UTC+9 (Japan Standard Time)
- Phone number: 0176-68-2111
- Address: 131-4 Morinoue, Shichinohe-machi, Kitakami-gun, Aomori-ken 039-2792
- Website: Official website
- Symbols
- Bird: Green pheasant
- Flower: Rhododendron
- Tree: Ginkgo biloba

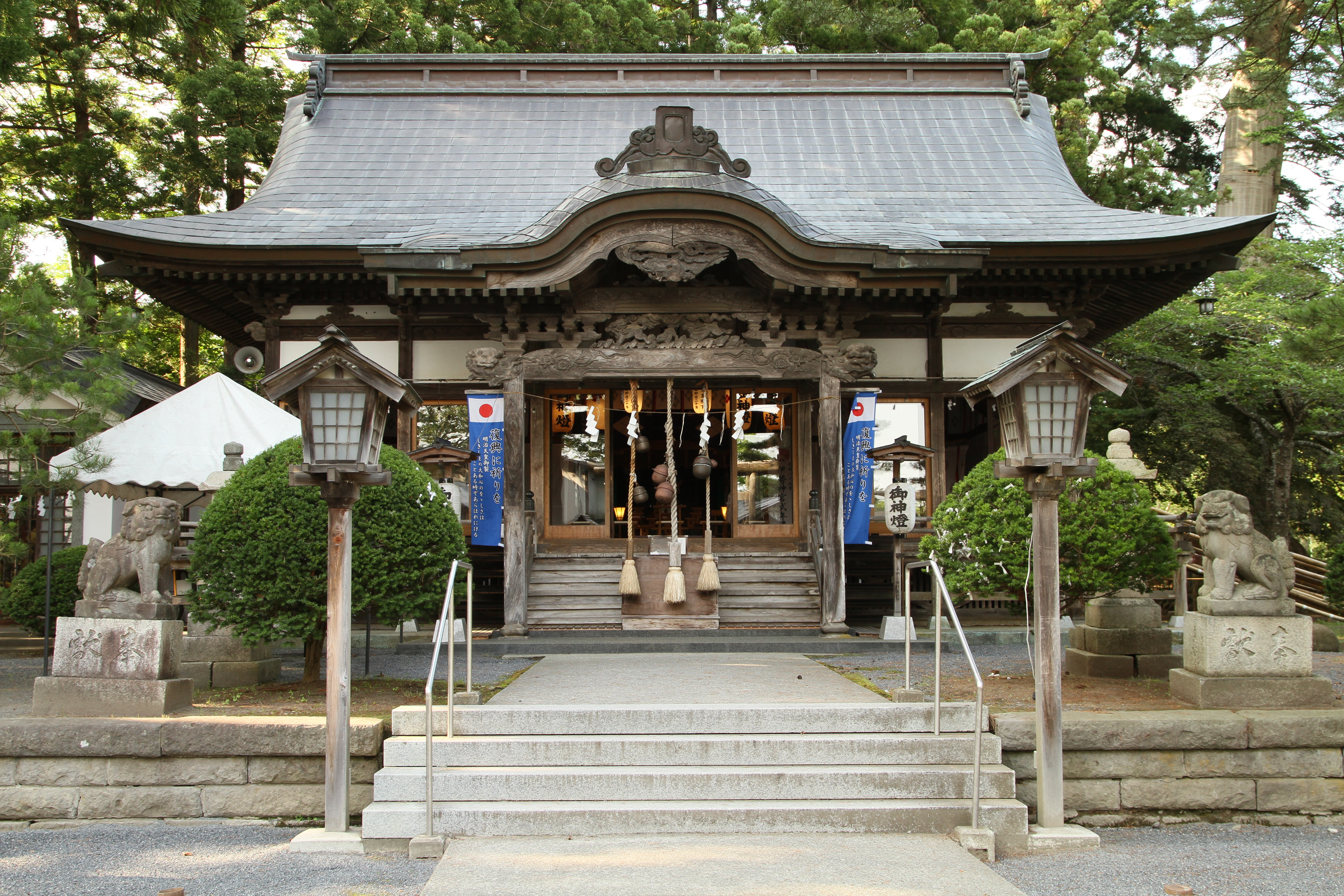
Shichinohe Shrine, located on the site of Shichinohe Castle

Shichinohe (七戸町, Shichinohe-machi) is a town located in Aomori Prefecture, Japan. As of 1 April 2020, the town had an estimated population of 13671 and a population density of 41 persons per km^{2}, in 6,718 households. The total area of the town is 337.23 square kilometers (130.21 sq mi).

== Geography ==
Shichinohe is in central Aomori Prefecture, to the east of the Hakkōda Mountains.

=== Neighboring municipalities ===
Aomori Prefecture

- Aomori
- Hiranai
- Tōhoku
- Towada

=== Climate ===
The town has a cold humid climate characterized by cool, short summers and long, cold winters with heavy snowfall (Köppen climate classification Cfa). The average annual temperature in Shichinohe is 9.8 °C. The average annual rainfall is 1233 mm with September as the wettest month. The temperatures are highest on average in August, at around 22.8 °C, and lowest in January, at around -2.1 °C.

== Demographics ==
Per Japanese census data, the population of Shichinohe peaked around 1960 and has declined over the past 60 years.

Historical population

Year	Pop.	±% p.a.
1920	15,044	—
1930	17,059	+1.26%
1940	20,015	+1.61%
1950	27,036	+3.05%
1960	28,752	+0.62%
1970	23,974	−1.80%

Year	Pop.	±% p.a.
1980	22,707	−0.54%
1990	21,237	−0.67%
2000	19,357	−0.92%
2010	16,763	−1.43%
2020	14,556	−1.40%

== History ==
Shichinohe began as one of a series of numbered fortified settlements established by the Nanbu clan in the early Kamakura period to control their new territories in Nukada District of northern Ōshū. Shichinohe Castle was controlled by a branch of the Nanbu clan for several generations until the end of Sengoku period, when in 1591, the Shichinohe Nanbu clan opposed the forces of Toyotomi Hideyoshi during the Kunohe Rebellion and were defeated. The clan survived as hatamoto under the main lineage of the Nanbu clan at Morioka Domain under the Edo period Tokugawa shogunate. The Shichinohe Domain, a subsidiary domain of Morioka Domain was created in 1819.

During the post-Meiji restoration establishment of the modern municipalities system on 1 April 1889, Shichinohe Village was incorporated. It was elevated to town status in 1949. On 31 March 2005, the neighboring village of Tenmabayashi was merged into the town of Shichinohe. Shichinohe-Towada Station on the Tōhoku Shinkansen opened on 4 December 2010. This restored a rail link to the town after the closure of the Nanbu Jūkan Railway which previously connected Shichinohe Station with Noheji Station on the Tōhoku Main Line until 1997.

== Government ==
Shichinobe has a mayor-council form of government with a directly elected mayor and a unicameral town council of 16 members. Shichinohe is part of Kamikita District, which contributes four members to the Aomori Prefectural Assembly. In terms of national politics, the town is part of Aomori 2nd district of the lower house of the Diet of Japan.

== Economy ==
The economy of Shichinohe is heavily dependent on agriculture and stock raising. Primary crops include rice, Japanese yam and carrots. Dairy farming and racehorse production are also noted industries.

== Education ==
Shichinohe has three public elementary schools and two public middle schools operated by the town government, and one public high school operated by the Aomori Prefectural Board of Education. The prefecture also operates one special education school for the handicapped, and an agricultural vocational school.

== Transportation ==
=== Railway ===
East Japan Railway Company (JR East) - Tōhoku Shinkansen

- Shichinohe-Towada

=== Highway ===
- Kamikita Expressway
- Michinoku Toll Road
- National Route 4
- National Route 45 (unsigned)
- National Route 394

== International relations ==
- Hadong, South Gyeongsang, South Korea

== Local attractions ==
- Site of Shichinohe Castle, a National Historic Site
- Futatsumori Site, a Jōmon period settlement and shell midden that is a National Historic Site
- Takayama Uichi Memorial Museum of Art
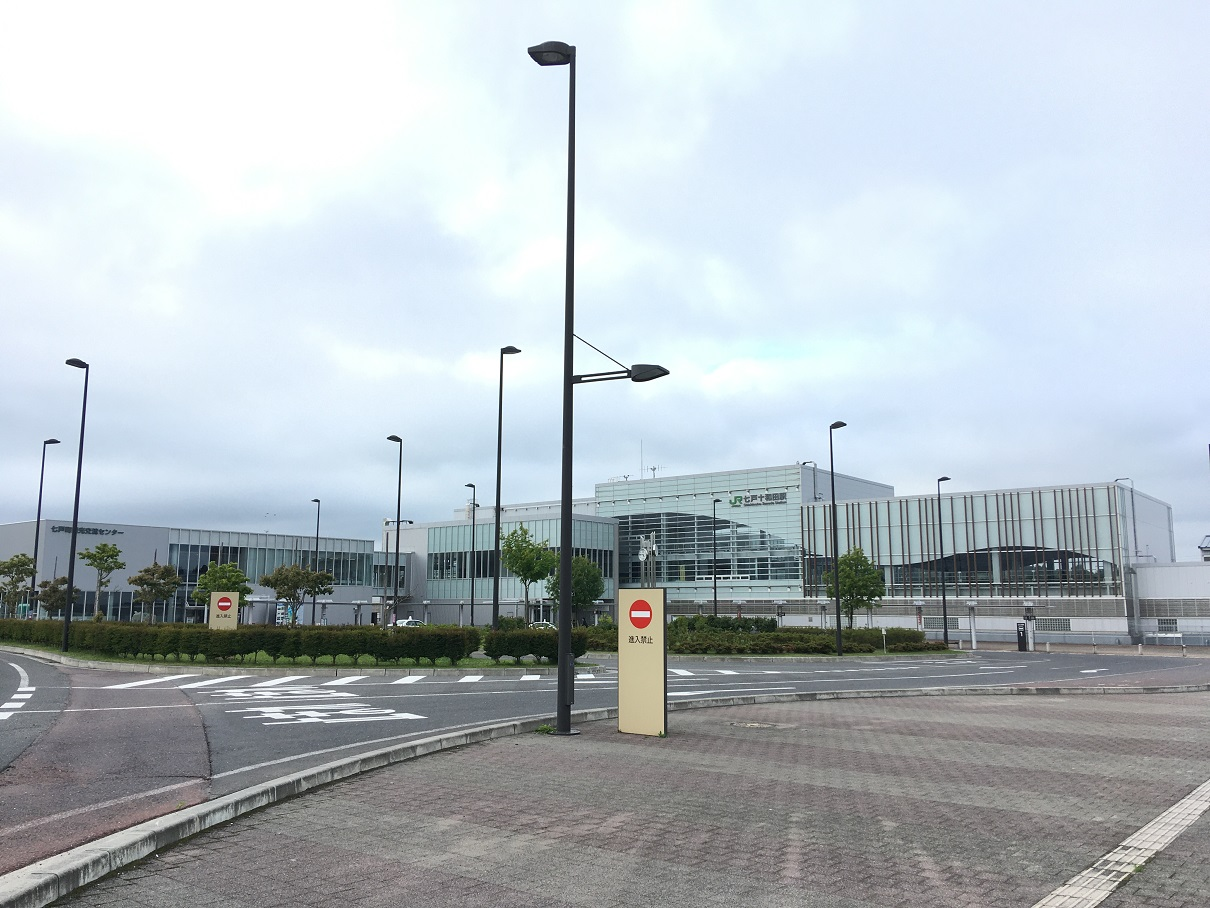
Shichinohe-Towada Station

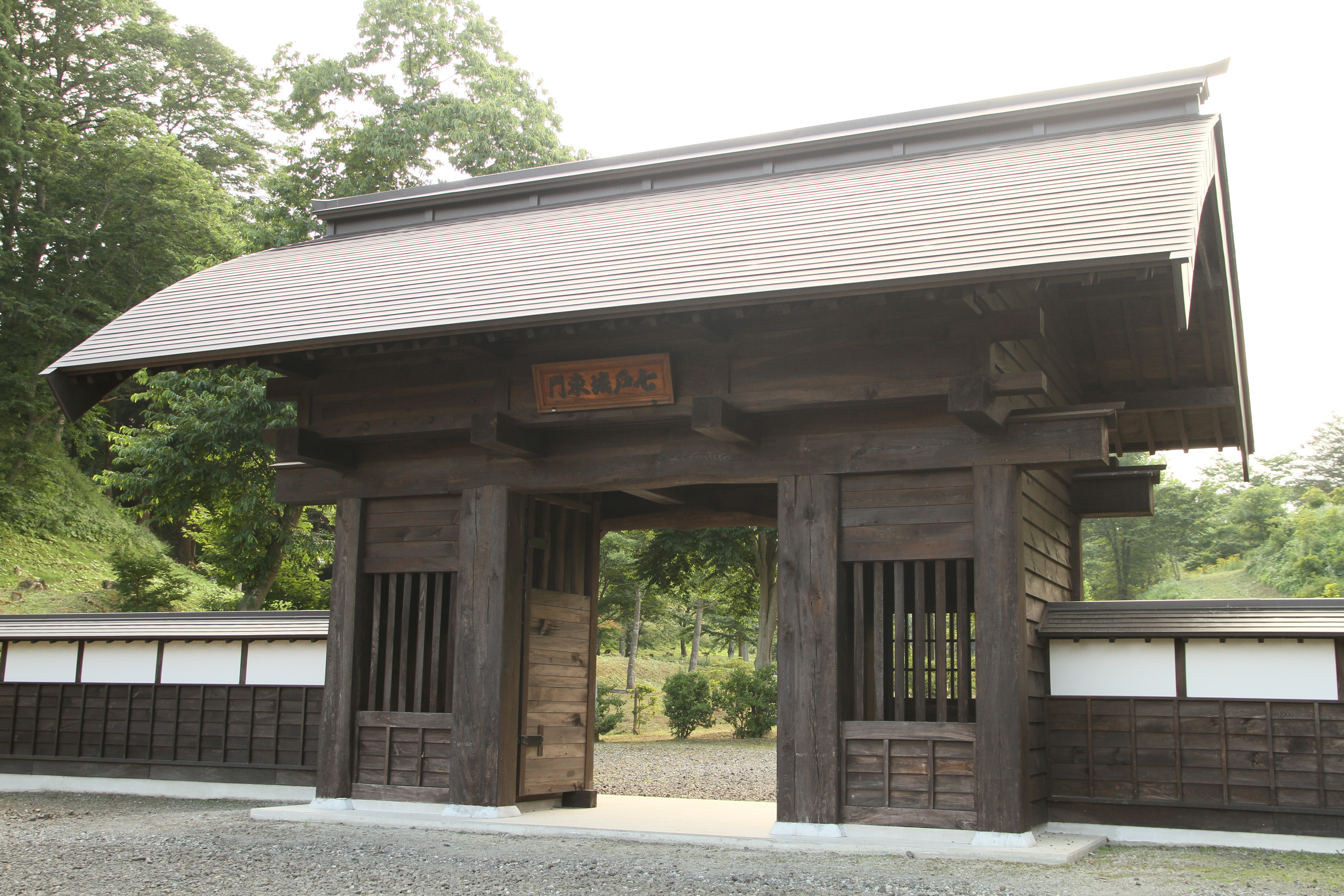
Gate of Shichinohe Castle

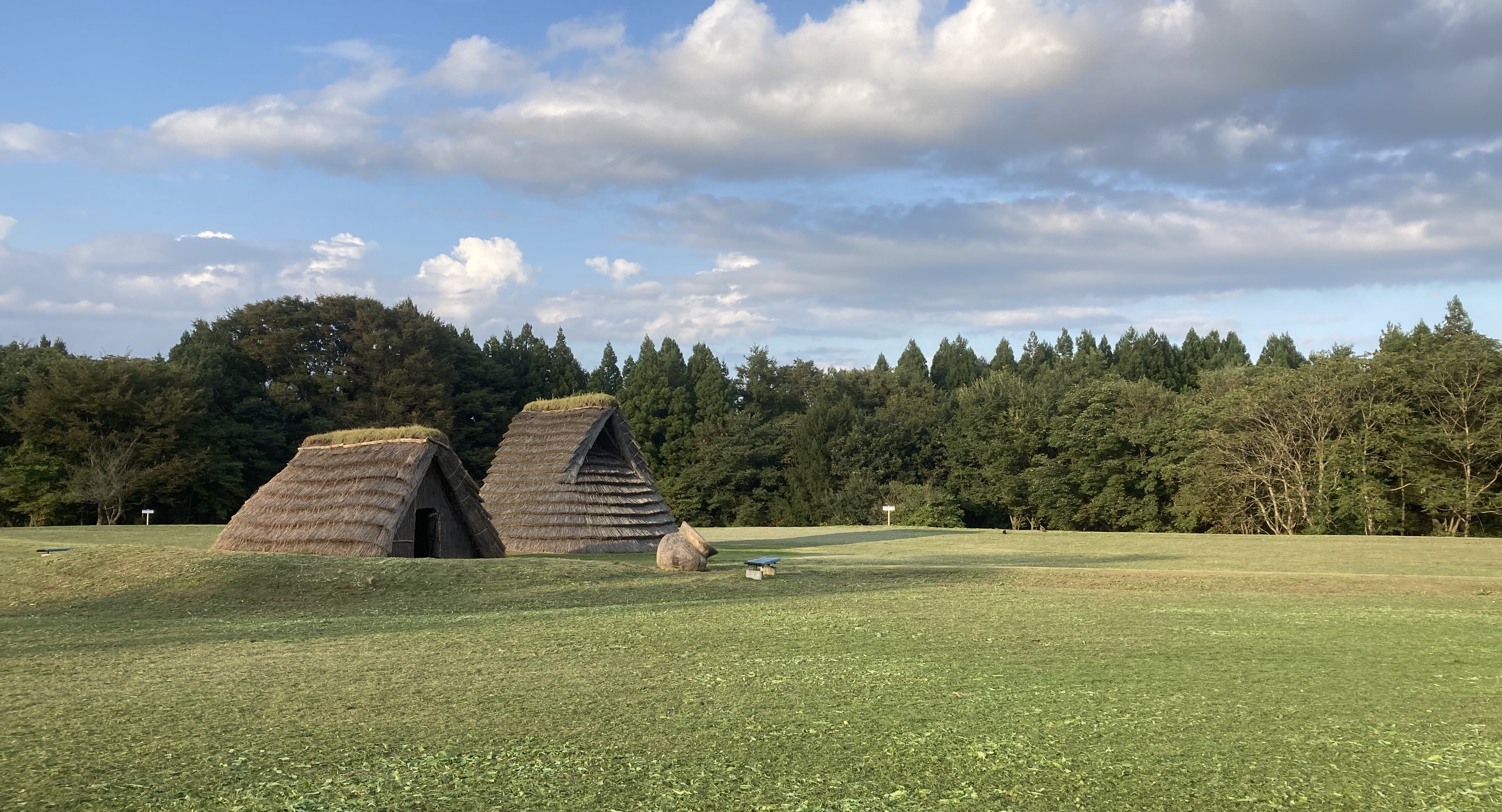
Futatsumori site

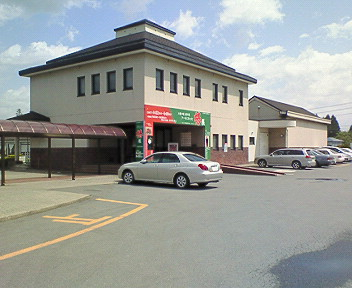
Takayama Uchi Memorial Museum

== Noted people from Shichinohe ==
- Takegoro Ebina, jockey
- Takehiro Hashimoto, professional baseball player
- Kaiki Nobuhide, sumo wrestler
- Uichi Takayama, artist
