= Tenmabayashi, Aomori =

Tenmabayashi 天間林村
- Former municipality
- Flag Seal

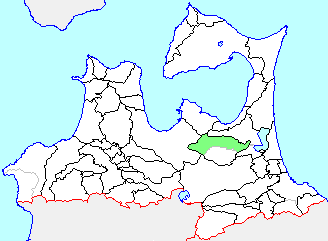
- Location of Tenmabayashi in Aomori Prefecture

- Location in Japan
- Coordinates: 40°44′40.7″N 141°09′27.3″E
- Country: Japan
- Region: Tōhoku
- Prefecture: Aomori Prefecture
- District: Kamikita
- Merged: March 31, 2005 (now part of Shichinohe)

Area
  - Total: 202.59 km^{2} (78.22 sq mi)

Population (1 January 2005)
  - Total: 8,354
  - Density: 41.23/km^{2} (106.8/sq mi)
- Time zone: UTC+09:00 (JST)
- Symbols
- Bird: Green pheasant
- Flower: Japanese bellflower
- Tree: Zelkova serrata

Tenmabayashi (天間林村, Tenmabayashi-mura) was a village located in Kamikita District in central Aomori Prefecture, Japan.

== History ==
The village of Tenmabayashi was founded in 1889 from the merger of seven small hamlets. On 31 March 2005, Tenmabayashi was merged into the neighboring and expanding town of Shichinohe, and thus no longer exists as an independent municipality.

At the time of its merger, the village had an estimated population of 8,354 and a density of 41.23 persons per km^{2}. The total area was 202.59 km^{2}.

== Economy ==
Located in central Aomori Prefecture, the village of Tenmabayashi had an economy based on primarily on agriculture, with the village's principal crops including rice, garlic, and Japanese yam.

== Transportation ==
Tenmabayashi was served by the highways National Route 4 and National Route 394, but had no railway service at the time of its merger with Shichinohe. It was formerly served by the Nanbu Jūkan Railway, a railbus service that stopped at Ushirotai, Tenmabayashi, Tsubo, Tsubogawa, Michinokami, Tenmabayashi, and Nakano stations in the village.
