= Shichinohe Station =

Disused railway station in Shichinohe town, Aomori prefecture, Japan

Shichinohe Station 七戸駅
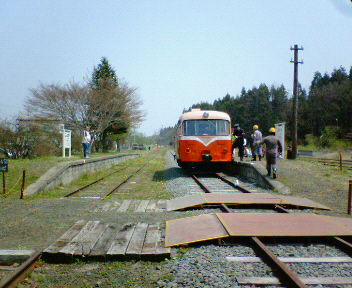
- Shichinohe Station in 2007

General information
- Location: Japan
- Coordinates: 40°41′48″N 141°09′55″E
- System: Railway station
- Line: Nanbu Jūkan Railway
- Platforms: 2
- Tracks: 2

History
- Opened: 20 October 1962
- Closed: 1 August 2002
Location
- Location within Japan

Shichinohe Station (七戸駅, Shichinohe-eki) is a former railway station on the former Nanbu Jūkan Railway in Shichinohe, Aomori, Japan.

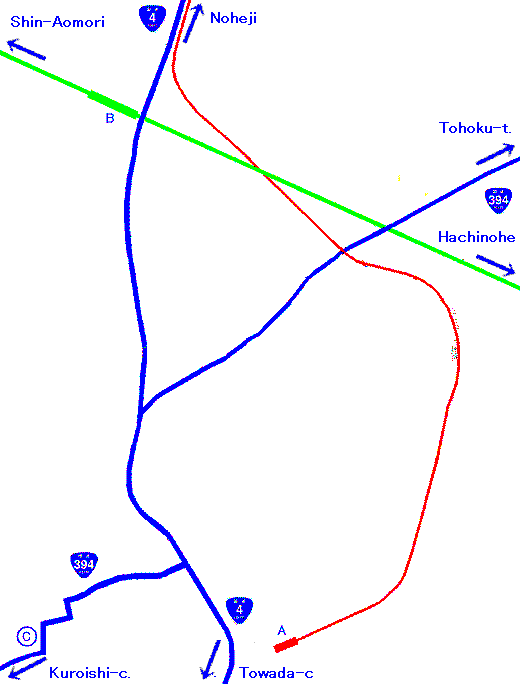
Shichinohe station old and new Red: Nanbu Jūkan Railway Green: Tōhoku Shinkansen Blue: National Highways A and B: Shichinohe Station C: Shichinohe Town office (before 2005)

There was once a plan to use the Nanbu Jūkan Railway to connect the Tōhoku Shinkansen with Noheji or Mutsu, but the railway was closed before the construction of the Tōhoku Shinkansen started.

== History ==
Shichinohe Station opened on 20 October 1962 as the southern terminus of the Nanbu Jūkan Railway. The final services to and from the station were carried out on 6 May 1997 when the railway ceased operations. On 1 August 2002, the station formally closed. The station is currently maintained by the railway enthusiast volunteers and is the headquarters of the Nanbu Jūkan Company.

== Layout ==
The former station had two side platforms serving two tracks.
