= Nanbu Shigenobu =

- 南部重信
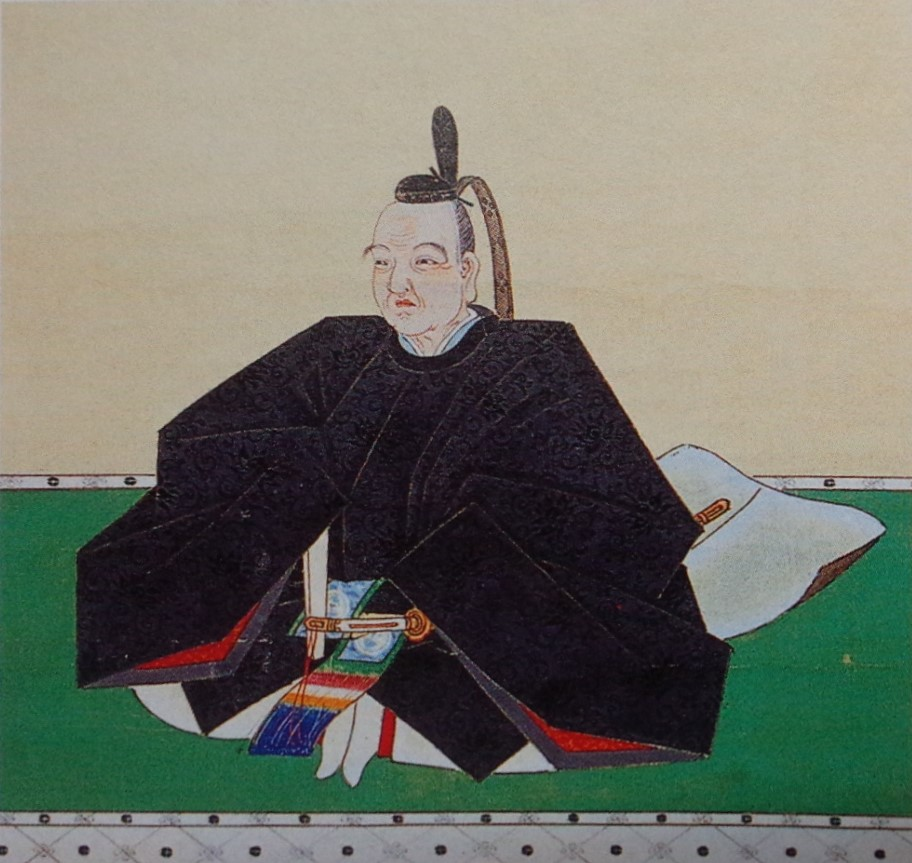
- Portrait of Nanbu Shigenobu
- Born: June 28, 1616; Shimohei District, Iwate, Japan
- Died: July 12, 1702 (aged 86); Edo, Japan
- Burial place: Shoju-ji, Morioka, Iwate, Japan
- Title: Daimyō of Morioka Domain
- Predecessor: Nanbu Shigenao
- Successor: Nanbu Yukinobu
- Parents: Nanbu Toshinao (father); daughter of Hanawa Masatomo (mother)

Nanbu Shigenobu (南部重信; 28 June 1616 – 12 July 1702) was an early to mid-Edo period Japanese samurai, and the 3rd daimyō of Morioka Domain in northern Japan. He was the 29th hereditary chieftain of the Nanbu clan. His courtesy title was Daizen-daifu, and his Court rank was Junior Fifth Rank, Lower Grade, later raised to Junior Fourth Rank, Lower Grade.

Shigenobu was the 5th son of Nanbu Toshinao, and his mother was from the Hei clan who formerly ruled Hei District before it was conquered by the Nanbu. Shigenobu was born in Hanawa village of Hei District where his father was stationed to supervise the construction of port facilities at Miyako. As a child, he was raised at a local Buddhist temple and played with the children of local commoners. However, in 1648 he was made castellan of the Nanbu clan's secondary castle at Shichinohe.

In December 1664, Shigenobu's elder brother Nanbu Shigenao died without a biological heir, and he was recalled to Morioka on order for the Tokugawa shogunate to become daimyō of Morioka Domain. At the same time, Morioka was reduced from a kokudaka of 100,000 koku to 80,000 koku by the creation of Hachinohe Domain for his younger brother Nanbu Naofusa. Shigenobu was received in formal audience by shōgun Tokugawa Ietsuna on 15 December 1664.

Under Shigenobu's tenure, the domain engaged in land reclamation projects which opened new rice lands. He was promoted to Junior Fourth Rank, Lower Grade ion 7 May 1683 and Morioka's kokudaka was officially restored back to 100,000 koku. He also developed copper mines as a source of revenue and engaged in various public works, including flood control projects. His tenure was regarded as a period of relative peace and prosperity for Morioka.

On 27 June 1692, he retired in favor of his eldest son, Nanbu Yukinobu, and died at the clan residence in Edo at the age of 87 in 1702.

== Notes ==
Preceded by Nanbu Shigenao	3rd (Nanbu) Daimyō of Morioka; 1664–1702	Succeeded by Nanbu Yukinobu
