= Katō Akizane =

- 加藤明実
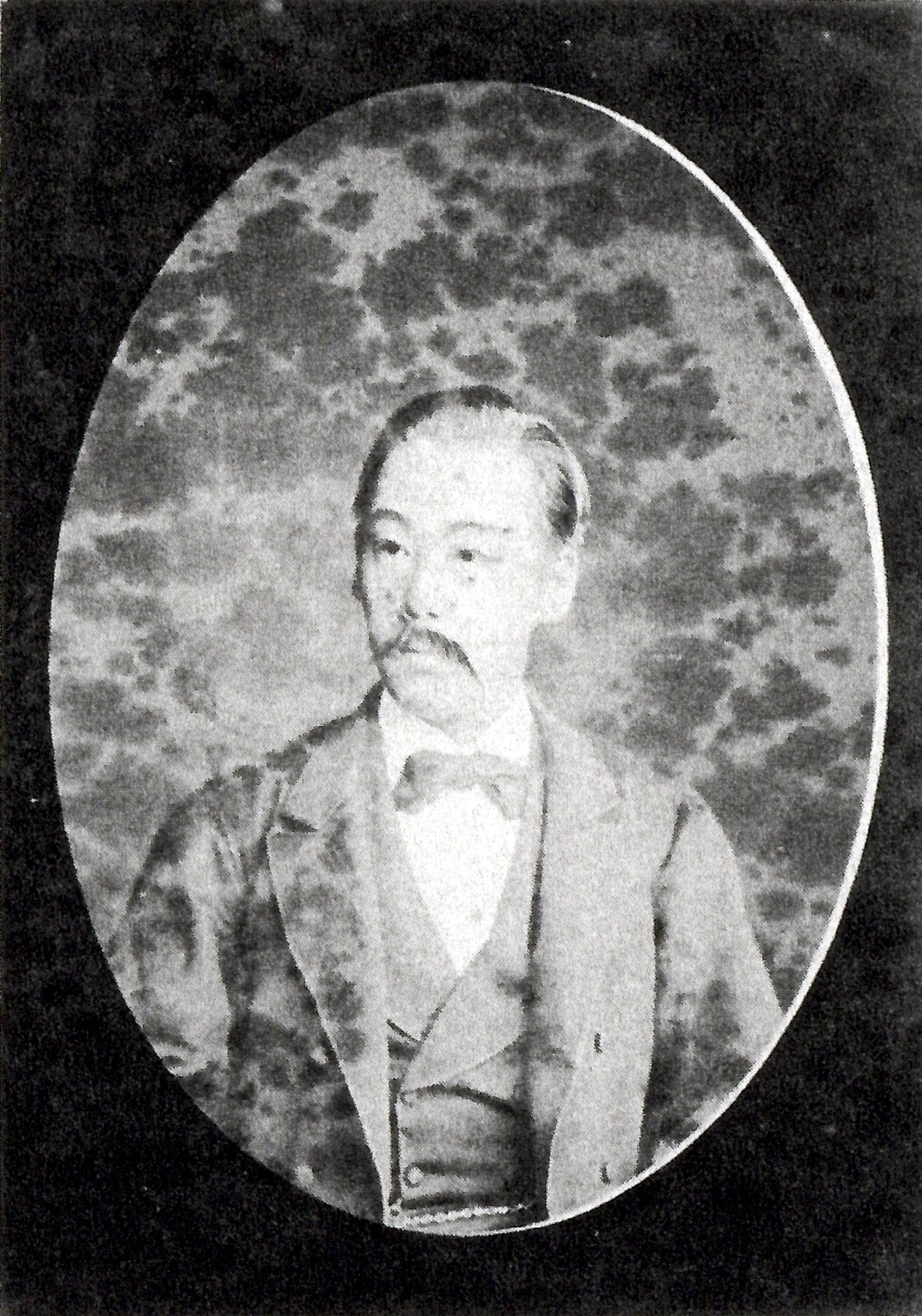
- Katō Akizane, post-Meiji restoration

9th Daimyō of Minakuchi Domain
- In office 1866–1868
- Monarchs: Shōgun: Tokugawa Iemochi; Tokugawa Yoshinobu
- Preceded by: Katō Akinori
- Succeeded by: < position abolished >

Imperial Governor of Minakuchi
- In office 1869–1871
- Monarch: Emperor Meiji

Personal details
- Born: April 4, 1848
- Died: November 29, 1906 (aged 58)
- Parent: Katō Akikuni (father)

Katō Akizane (加藤明実; April 4, 1848 – November 29, 1906) was the 9th (and final) daimyō of Minakuchi Domain in Bakumatsu period Japan and was the 13th hereditary chieftain of the Minaguchi-Kato clan. Before the Meiji Restoration, his courtesy title was Noto-no-kami, and his final Court rank was Senior Fourth Rank.

== Biography ==
Katō Akizane was the seventh son of Katō Akikuni, 7th daimyō of Minakuchi, and was born at the domain's Edo residence. In 1863 he was adopted as heir to his elder brother, Katō Akinori, the 8th daimyō and was received in formal audience with Shogun Tokugawa Iemochi in 1865. He married a daughter of Katō Yasumoto, daimyō of Ōzu Domain, and later remarried to a daughter of Arima Yoshishige of Kurume Domain. His third wife was a daughter of Nanbu Nobuyuki of Hachinohe Domain. In 1866, his brother retired and he became daimyō and head of the clan. The forces of Minaguchi Domain were assigned to guard the temple of Sennyū-ji in Kyoto, which for centuries had been a mausoleum for noble families and members of the Imperial House of Japan. The following year, he was assigned to the guard of the city of Kyoto itself. At the start of the Boshin War, he quickly joined the impala cause, and was assigned to the capture and administer the territories in Ōmi Province belonging to pro-Tokugawa Kawagoe Domain and Mikami Domain.

In 1869, under the Meiji government, he was appointed imperial governor of Minakuchi, a post he held until the abolition of the han system in 1871. He relocated to Tokyo, and was given the kazoku peerage title of shishaku (viscount) in 1884. He died in Tokyo in 1906 at the age of 59. His grave is at the Otani Cemetery at Gojōzaka, Kyoto.
