= Katō clan =

Katō 加藤氏
- Mon of the Katō clan
- Home province: Tōtōmi Province
- Titles: Shishaku (viscount).
- Founder: Fujiwara Kagemichi
- Final ruler: Katō Akizane
- Founding year: mid-Heian period
- Dissolution: July 15, 1871
- Ruled until: 1871, abolition of the han system
- Cadet branches: Toyoma clan, Itami clan

The Katō clan (加藤氏, Katō-shi) was a samurai and aristocratic clan in Japan. It was said that the Ka in Katō came from the Fujiwara clan of Kaga. Katō Kiyomasa came from the Katō clan, who claimed to be descendants of the Fujiwara-Kitaoji clan. Katō Mitsuyasu and Yoshiaki were descendants of the Fujiwara-Kitaoji clan. The latter two branches became the lords of Ōzu and Minakuchi respectively in the early modern period, and after the Meiji Restoration, both clans were ennobled as viscounts.

== History ==
It is believed that the first person to be called Katō was Fujiwara Kagemichi, who served under Minamoto no Yorimitsu. He was given the title of Kaga no Fujiwara, which was later abbreviated to Katō. Katō Kagenobu, who is said to be the great-grandson of Kagemichi, participated in Minamoto no Yoritomo's uprising. After the downfall of the Taira clan and the establishment of the Kamakura shogunate, he became a vassal of the Kamakura government. He was ordered by Yoritomo to defeat Yasuda Yoshisada, along with Kajiwara Kagesue. Although he later obtained the position of Jito (land steward) in the Ashiba Manor in Tōtōmi Province, his land was confiscated when Kajiwara Kagesue was killed, possibly due to his close relationship with Kagesue.

Since the Sengoku period, the Kato Mitsuyasu line has been prominent. Katō Mitsuyasu served under Toyotomi Hideyoshi and was granted the Kai Province of 240,000 koku. His son, Katō Sadayasu, was reduced to 40,000 koku in Mino Province in 1594, and then transferred to the Yonago Domain in 1610, where he received an additional 20,000 koku, totaling 60,000 koku. In 1617, he was transferred to the Ōzu Domain. The domain continued until the abolition of the han system. The last lord, Katō Yasuaki, was appointed as the governor of the Ōzu Domain in June 1869, during the abolition of the han system, and served as the governor until the abolition of the han system in July 1871.

== List of Daimyō ==
#	Name	Tenure	Courtesy title	Court Rank	kokudaka
Katō clan, 1571-1871 (Fudai)
1	Katō Mitsuyasu (加藤光泰)	1571–1593	Tōtōmi no kami (遠江守)	Junior 5th Rank Lower Grade (従五位下)	5,700 koku
2	Katō Sadayasu (加藤貞泰)	1617–1623	Shimozaemon Jō (下左衛門尉)	Junior 5th Rank Lower Grade (従五位下)	5,700 koku
3	Katō Yasuoki (加藤泰興)	1623–1674	Shimodewa no kami (下出羽守)	Junior 5th Rank Lower Grade (従五位下)	5,700 koku
4	Katō Yasutsune (加藤泰恒)	1674–1715	Tōtōmi no kami (遠江守)	Junior 5th Rank Lower Grade (従五位下)	5,700 koku
5	Katō Yasumune (加藤泰統)	1715–1727	Shimodewa no kami (下出羽守)	Junior 5th Rank Lower Grade (従五位下)	5,700 koku
6	Katō Yasuatsu (加藤泰温)	1727–1745	Tōtōmi no kami (遠江守)	Junior 5th Rank Lower Grade (従五位下)	5,700 koku
7	Katō Yasutake (加藤泰武)	1762–1768	Tōtōmi no kami (遠江守)	Junior 5th Rank Lower Grade (従五位下)	5,700 koku
8	Katō Yasuyuki (加藤泰行)	1768–1769	Shimodewa no kami (下出羽守)	Junior 5th Rank Lower Grade (従五位下)	5,700 koku
9	Katō Yasutoki (加藤泰候)	1769–1787	Tōtōmi no kami (遠江守)	Junior 5th Rank Lower Grade (従五位下)	5,700 koku
10	Kato Yasuzumi (加藤泰済)	1787–1826	Tōtōmi no kami (遠江守)	Junior 5th Rank Lower Grade (従五位下)	5,700 koku
11	Katō Yasumoto (加藤泰幹)	1826–1853	Tōtōmi no kami (遠江守)	Junior 5th Rank Lower Grade (従五位下)	5,700 koku
12	Katō Yasutomi (加藤泰祉)	1853–1864	Shimodewa no kami (下出羽守)	Junior 5th Rank Lower Grade (従五位下)	5,700 koku
13	Katō Yasuaki (加藤泰秋)	1864–1871	Tōtōmi no kami (遠江守)	Senior 2nd Rank Lower Grade (上級二位下)	5,700 koku

Katō Yoshiaki Lineage

Katō Yoshiaki was originally a retainer of the Matsudaira clan, but he rebelled against his lord, Matsudaira Motoyasu (later Tokugawa Ieyasu), during the Ikkō-ikki and fled. Born as Noriaki's son, Katō Yoshiaki served under Toyotomi Hideyoshi and became one of the Seven Spears of Shizugatake. He played an active role in the Odawara campaign and the Korean expedition under the Toyotomi regime. After the death of Toyotomi Hideyoshi, he approached Tokugawa Ieyasu and became a daimyō of Iyo-Matsuyama Domain with 210,000 koku in the Battle of Sekigahara. Yoshiaki was later granted an additional 400,000 koku and became a powerful daimyo of Aizu Domain in his later years. However, after Yoshiaki's death, his successor Katō Akinari was deprived of his domain due to the Aizu Incident. Akinari's illegitimate son, Katō Meitomo, was allowed to revive as a daimyō of Omihachiman Domain with 20,000 koku.

When he was transferred to Mibu Domain in Shimotsuke Province, he was granted an additional 5,000 koku, and after being returned to Mizuguchi Domain in 1713, the same domain continued to exist until the abolition of the han system. The last daimyō of Minakuchi Domain, Akihisa, was appointed as the governor of Minakuchi Domain in June 1869, and served as the governor of the same domain until the abolition of the han system in July 1871. With the integration of court nobles and daimyo families in the administrative officials on June 17, 1869, the peerage system was established, and the Kato clan was also listed as a peerage as a daimyō clan. When the peerage system became the five peerage system with the enforcement of the Peerage Law on July 7, 1884, he was listed as a viscount August 8, 1884 as a former small han governor.

== List of Daimyō ==
#	Name	Tenure	Courtesy title	Court Rank	kokudaka
Katō clan, 1600-1871 (Fudai)
1	Katō Yoshiaki (加藤嘉明)	1600–1627	Samasuke (左馬助)	Junior 3rd Rank Lower Grade (従三位下)	210,000 koku
2	Katō Akinari (加藤明成)	1627–1643	Shosuke Shikibu (式部少輔)	Junior 4th Rank Lower Grade (従三位下)	210,000 koku
3	Katō Akitomo (加藤明友)	1643–1682	Kuranosuke (内蔵助)	Junior 5th Rank Lower Grade (従五位下)	210,000 koku
4	Katō Akihide (加藤明英)	1682–1695	Sado no kami (佐渡守), Etchu no kami (越中守)	Junior 5th Rank Lower Grade (従五位下)	210,000 koku
5	Katō Yoshinori (加藤嘉矩)	1695–1712	Izumi no kami (和泉守)	Junior 5th Rank Lower Grade (従五位下)	210,000 koku
6	Katō Akitsune (加藤明経)	1712–1746	Izumi no kami (和泉守)	Junior 5th Rank Lower Grade (従五位下)	210,000 koku
7	Katō Akihiro (加藤明煕)	1746–1767	Bungo no kami (豊後守), Sado no kami (佐渡守), Sagami no kami (相模守)	Junior 5th Rank Lower Grade (従五位下)	210,000 koku
8	Katō Akitaka (加藤明堯)	1767–1778	Noto no kami (能登守), Ise no kami (伊勢守)	Junior 5th Rank Lower Grade (従五位下)	210,000 koku
9	Katō Akinobu (加藤明陳)	1778–1799	Noto no kami (能登守), Ise no kami (伊勢守)	Junior 5th Rank Lower Grade (従五位下)	210,000 koku
10	Katō Akimasa (加藤明允)	1799 1815	Noto no kami (能登守), Ise no kami (伊勢守)	Junior 5th Rank Lower Grade (従五位下)	210,000 koku
11	Katō Akikuni (加藤明邦)	1815–1845	Sado no kami (佐渡守), Noto no kami (能登守)	Junior 5th Rank Lower Grade (従五位下)	210,000 koku
12	Katō Akinori (加藤明軌)	1845–1866	Izumi no kami (和泉守), Etchu no kami (越中守)	Junior 5th Rank Lower Grade (従五位下)	210,000 koku
13	Katō Akizane (加藤明実)	1866–1871	Noto no kami (能登守)	Junior 5th Rank Lower Grade (従五位下)	210,000 koku
