= Nanbu Shigenao =

- 南部重直
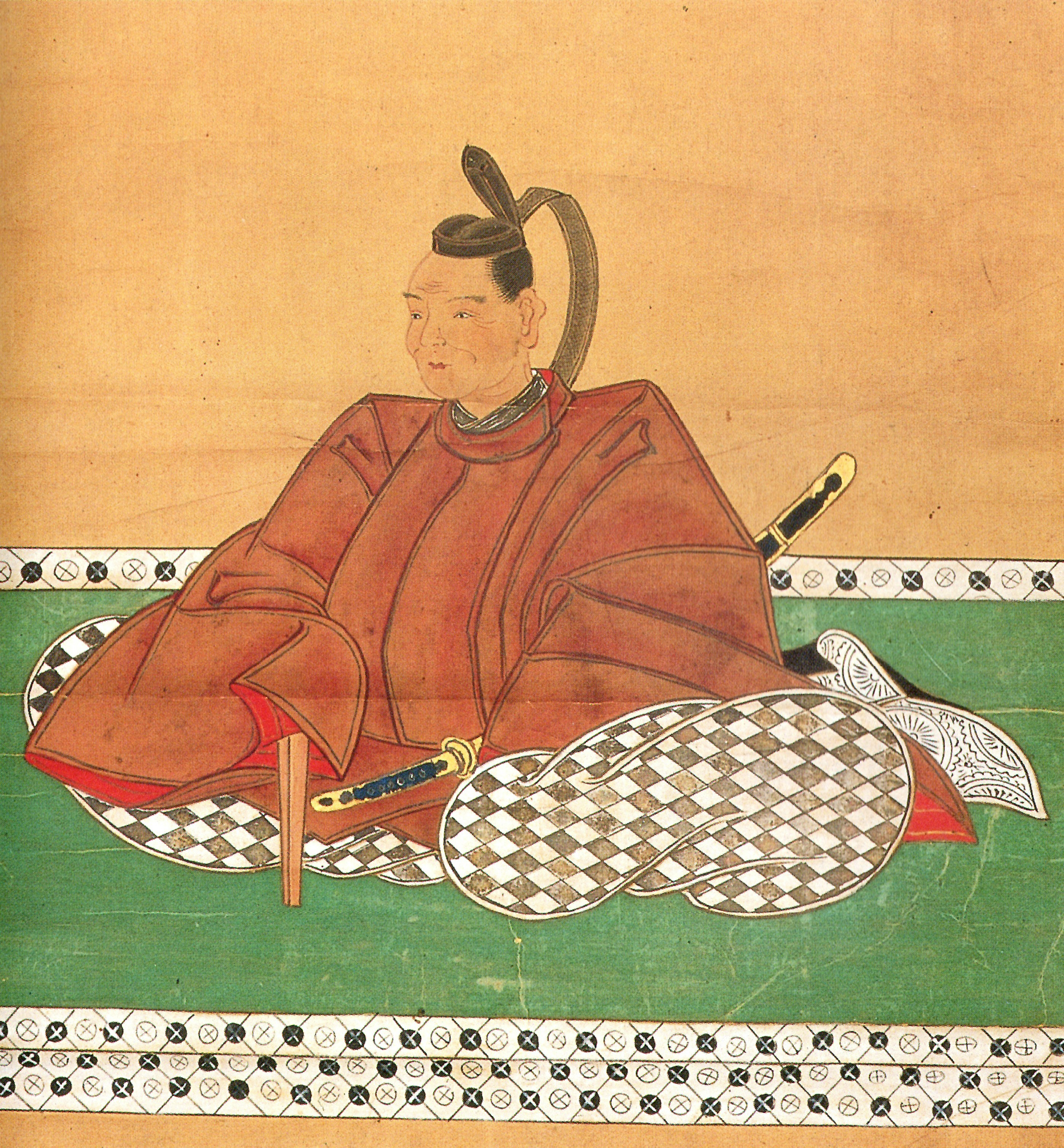
- Portrait of Nanbu Shigenao
- Born: April 16, 1606; Edo, Japan
- Died: October 30, 1664 (aged 58); Edo, Japan
- Burial place: Shoju-ji, Morioka, Iwate, Japan
- Title: Daimyō of Morioka Domain
- Predecessor: Nanbu Toshinao
- Successor: Nanbu Shigenobu
- Spouse: daughter of Katō Yoshiaki
- Parents: Nanbu Toshinao (father); daughter of Gamō Ujisato (mother)

Nanbu Shigenao (南部重直; 16 April 1606 – 30 October 1664) was an early Edo period Japanese samurai, and the 2nd daimyō of Morioka Domain in northern Japan. He was the 28th hereditary chieftain of the Nanbu clan. His courtesy title was Yamashiro-no-kami, and his Court rank was Junior Fifth Rank, Lower Grade.

Shigenao was the 3rd son of Nanbu Toshinao, and was born at the clan's Sakurada residence in Edo. He became daimyō on the death of his father in 1632. During his tenure, Morioka Castle was completed, and he laid out the streets of the surrounding castle town in a grid network. Of severe disposition, he had no heir and adopted a son of Hotta Masamori, daimyō of Sakura Domain, which also opened the possibility for the clan to change to fudai daimyō status. However, in April 1636, his sankin-kōtai procession arrived in Edo ten days late, which was a violation of the new Buke shohatto regulations issued by shōgun Tokugawa Iemitsu, and he was declared unfit to govern, and sentenced to house arrest at the clan residence in Edo.

After his death in Edo in 1664, the Tokugawa shogunate intervened, and by order of Shogun Tokugawa Ietsuna appointed his younger brother Shichinohe Shigenobu as the next daimyō, with the son of Hotta Masamori reduced to hatamoto status. The kokudaka of Morioka Domain was also reduced by 20,000 koku to 80,000 koku, with the creation of Hachinohe Domain for Shigenao's third brother, Nakasato Naoyoshi, who was renamed Nanbu Naofusa.

== Notes ==
Preceded by Nanbu Toshinao	2nd (Nanbu) Daimyō of Morioka; 1632–1664	Succeeded by Nanbu Shigenobu
