= Morioka Castle =

Coordinates: 39°41′59.81″N 141°09′0.04″E

- 盛岡城
- Morioka, Iwate Prefecture, Japan
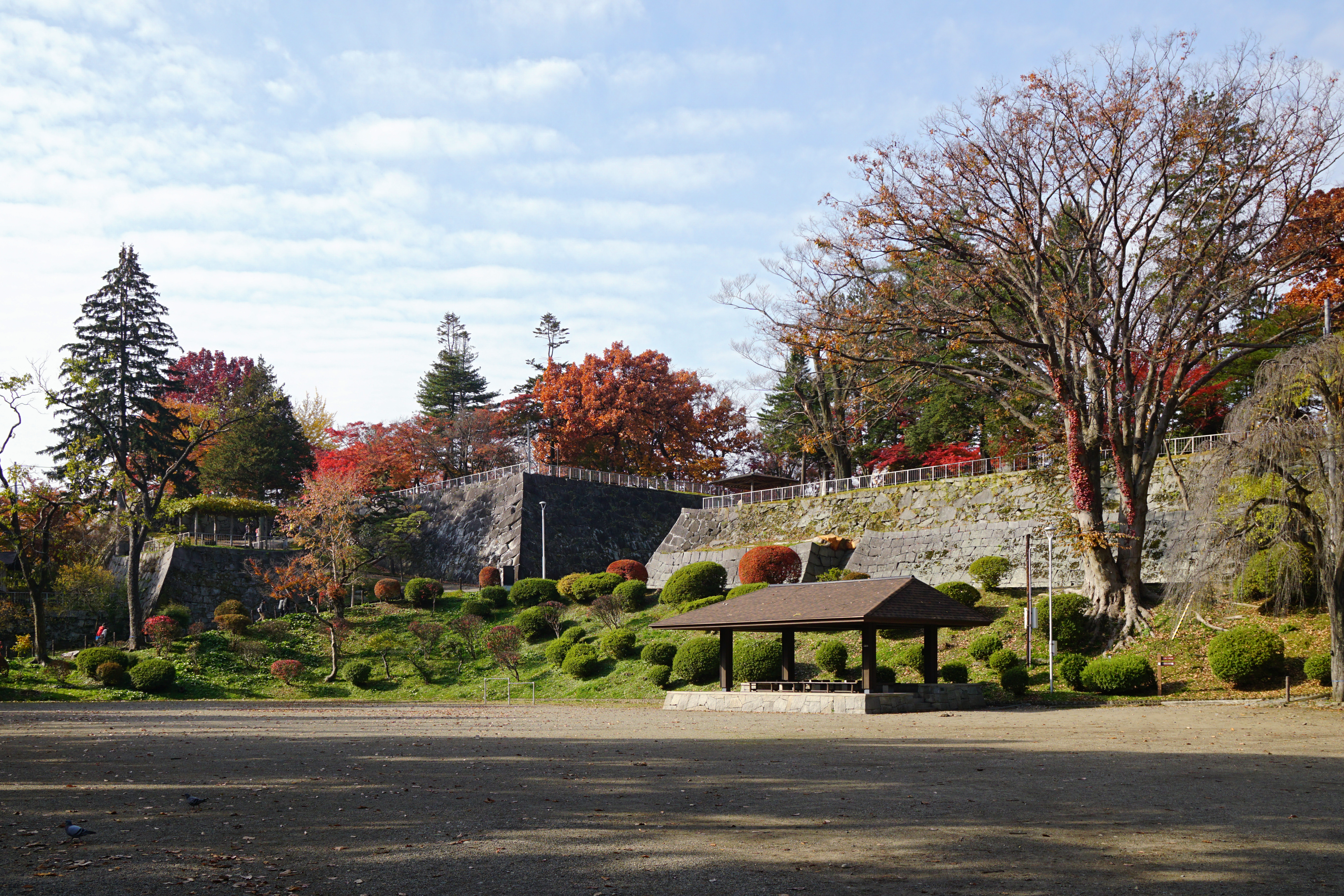
- Morioka Castle

Site information
- Type: hirayama-style Japanese castle
- Owner: city of Morioka
- Condition: National Historic Site

Location
- Morioka Castle Morioka Castle (Japan)

Site history
- Built: 1598-1633
- Built by: Nanbu clan
- In use: 1633-1889

Morioka Castle (盛岡城, Morioka-jō) is a hirayama-style Japanese castle constructed in 1611. It was the seat of the Nanbu clan, a tozama daimyō clan who ruled over Morioka Domain, Mutsu Province in the Tōhoku region of northern Japan during the Edo period Tokugawa shogunate. The castle is located in what is now the center of the city of Morioka, Iwate Prefecture, Japan. It was also referred to as Kozukata Castle (不来方城, Kozukata-jō), but strictly speaking this name pertains to the predecessor of Morioka Castle on the same site.

== Location ==
The confluence of the Kitakami River and the Nakatsu River was of strategic importance in control of river traffic in central Ōshū. The location of the castle was also intended to control traffic on the Ōshū Kaidō highway from the capital to the northern end of Honshū island, and beyond to Ezo (modern Hokkaidō), and also traffic on a route across the Ōu Mountains which connected the Pacific and Sea of Japan coasts of Japan.

== History ==
Because of its strategic geographic position, the area around Morioka had been regarded as the center of northern Ōshū since the construction of nearby Shiwa Castle by the imperial dynasty in the early Heian period. The area was later contested between the Abe clan and the Kiyohara clan in the Former Nine Years War, and it is believed that the first fortification had been erected on this site by the Kiyohara clan. The Kiyohara were destroyed by the Northern Fujiwara of Hiraizumi, who in turn were destroyed by the Minamoto clan of the Kamakura shogunate. The area then came under the control of the Kudō clan, who were retainers of the Minamoto. During the Muromachi period, the Kudō clan was weakened by internal conflict between supporters of Emperor Go-Daigo and the Southern Court and supporters of the Ashikaga shogunate and the Northern Court, and were thus displaced by the Nanbu clan, who had already been established to the north.

During the late Sengoku period, Nanbu Nobunao pledged fealty to Toyotomi Hideyoshi at the Siege of Odawara in 1590 was confirmed as daimyō over all of the Nanbu territories, including lands around the site of old Kozukata Castle in Morioka. He decided to move his seat south from its former location at Sannohe Castle and to erect a new castle at Morioka. The design of the new castle may have been influenced by Nagoya Castle in Hizen Province, which he saw during the Japanese invasions of Korea. His holdings were re-confirmed after the Battle of Sekigahara by Tokugawa Ieyasu, and Morioka remained the seat of the Nanbu clan until the Meiji Restoration.

The actual construction work on Morioka Castle was supervised by his Nanbu Nobunao's son, Nanbu Toshinao, who later became the 1st daimyō of Morioka Domain, but the castle was not completed until 1633, during the tenure of Nanbu Shigenao, the 2nd daimyō. However, its three-story tenshu burned down only one year later, and was never rebuilt.

In 1906, the site was opened to the public as Iwate Park, with gardens laid out by modern park designer Yasuhei Nagaoka, and are a popular spot for viewing the sakura blossoms in spring. The castle site was donated by the Nanbu clan to the city of Morioka in 1934.

In 1937, the grounds were designated as a National Historic Site. In 2006, Morioka Castle was listed as one of the 100 Fine Castles of Japan by the Japan Castle Foundation.

== Structures and gardens ==
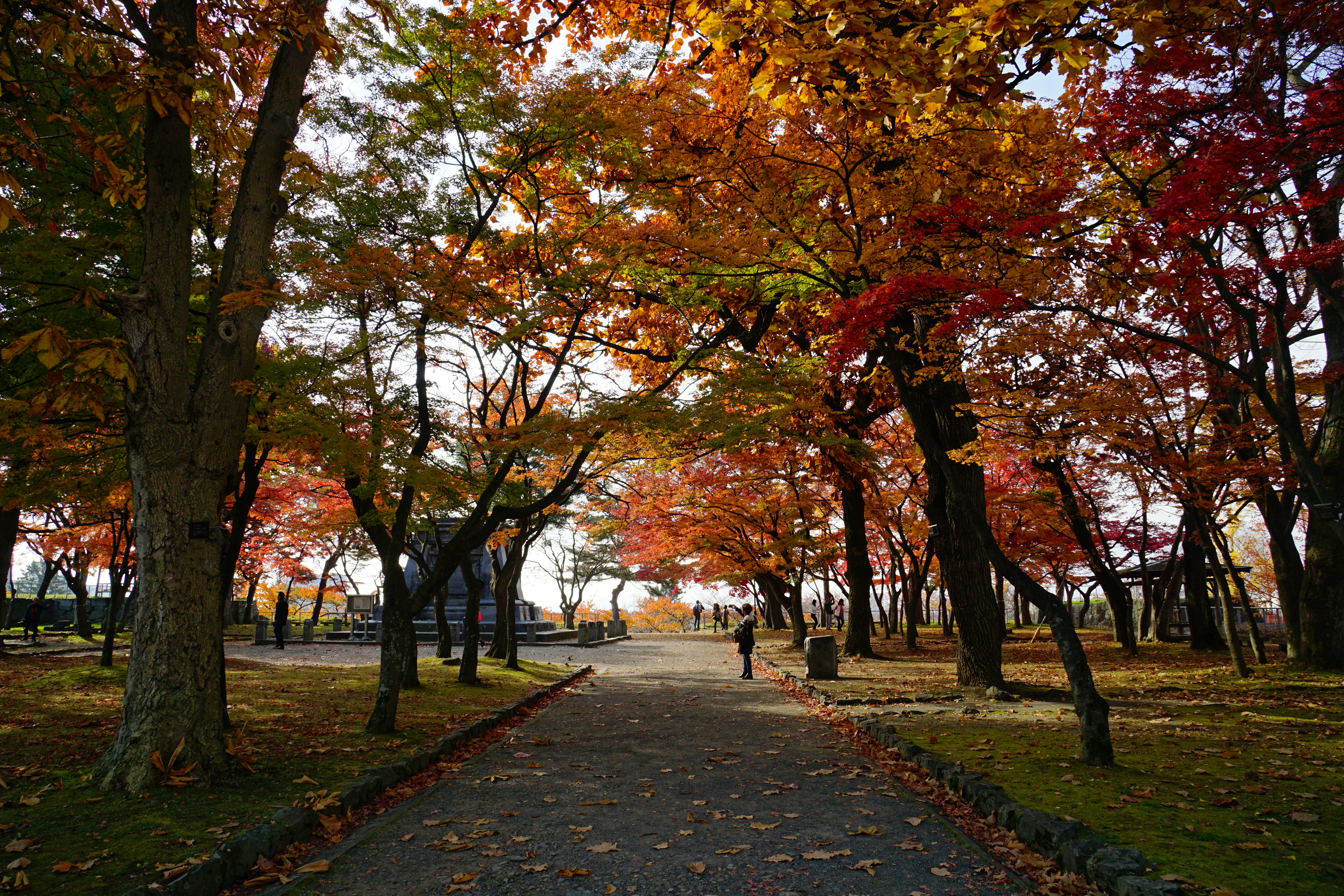
Honmaru

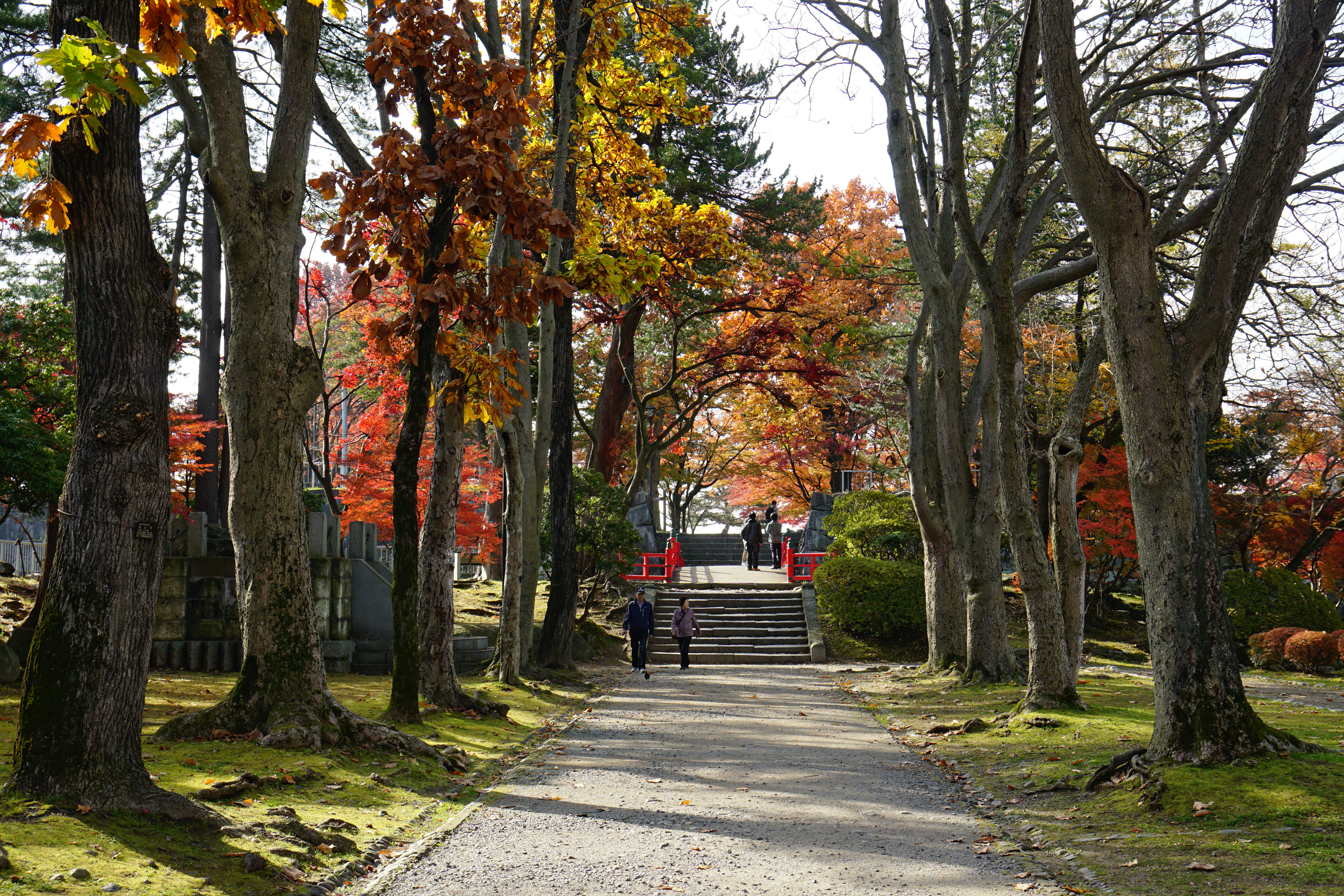
Ninomaru

Morioka Castle occupies a long and narrow elliptically shape hill approximately 300 meter long by 100 meter wide. The southeastern side faces the Nakatsu River, and formerly the main stream of Kitakami River protected the western side. As white granite was readily available in the vicinity, most of the ramparts were faced in stone, which was unusual for castles in the Tōhoku region at the time. Both the Toyotomi and Tokugawa governments encouraged the Nanbu to build a strong fortification, partly as a counter to the strength of the Date clan to the south.

The Inner bailey is a square area approximately 60 meters on a side, with a large gate on its eastern end. In the southern corner was a three-story yagura, which served as the tenshu after the main tower was lost in a fire in 1634. The remainder of the area was occupied by the palace and administrative structures of the Nanbu clan.

A secondary enclosure is positioned at the northern part of the inner citadel, and a red-painted bridge spans a moat that divides the two enclosures. There is a tertiary enclosure positioned at the northern end; a Koshi no kuruwa (腰曲輪), a Awaji maru (淡路丸) and a Sakakiyama kuruwa (榊山曲輪) enclose the inner citadel. Each area is protected by a huge masugata style composite gate.

All of the structures of the castle were dismantled during the early Meiji period, with the exception of a storehouse with thick mortar walls, reconstructed in the interior part of the castle, and a gate which is now relocated to a Zen temple within the city.

The surrounding Iwate Park (岩手公園, Iwate Kōen) (now known as Morioka Castle Ruins Park (盛岡城跡公園, Morioka-jō ato kōen)) contains a monument inscribed with a poem of Kenji Miyazawa, and also a monument in memory of Takuboku Ishikawa inscribed with one of his poems:

不来方のお城の草に寝ころびて空に吸はれし十五の心

Kozukata no oshiro no kusa ni nekorobite sora ni suwareshi jū-go no kokoro

(English: I laid down on the grass of the Kozukata Castle, absorbed by the sky; my heart of fifteen)

== See also ==
- List of Historic Sites of Japan (Iwate)

== Bibliography ==
- Benesch, Oleg and Ran Zwigenberg (2019). Japan's Castles: Citadels of Modernity in War and Peace. Cambridge: Cambridge University Press. p. 374. ISBN 9781108481946.
- De Lange, William (2021). An Encyclopedia of Japanese Castles. Groningen: Toyo Press. p. 600. ISBN 978-9492722300.
- Schmorleitz, Morton S. (1974). Castles in Japan. Tokyo: Charles E. Tuttle Co. pp. 144–145. ISBN 0-8048-1102-4.
- Motoo, Hinago (1986). Japanese Castles. Tokyo: Kodansha. p. 200 pages. ISBN 0-87011-766-1.
- Mitchelhill, Jennifer (2004). Castles of the Samurai: Power and Beauty. Tokyo: Kodansha. p. 112 pages. ISBN 4-7700-2954-3.
- Turnbull, Stephen (2003). Japanese Castles 1540–1640. Osprey Publishing. p. 64 pages. ISBN 1-84176-429-9.
