= Katō Yasuaki =

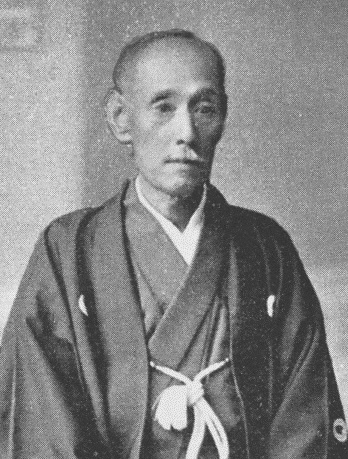
Yasuaki Kato

Viscount Katō Yasuaki (加藤 泰秋; 12 August 1846 – 17 June 1926) was the 13th and last daimyō of Ōzu Domain, Japan, prior to the Meiji reforms. Born in Ōzu Castle, Yasuaki was the second son of Katō Yasumoto. Yasuaki succeeded his elder brother Yasutomi as lord of Ōzu Domain upon the latter's death in 1864, changing status as governor of Ōzu after the domains were returned to the emperor. In 1867, he was responsible for guarding the Imperial Palace during the Kogosho Conference. During the Boshin War, he sent soldiers to Ōshū. He retired as governor in 1871 following the abolition of domains in favor of prefectural government, and moved to Tokyo.

Katō Yasuaki House of Katō Born: 12 August 1846 Died: 17 June 1926
Regnal titles
| Preceded by Katō Yasutomi | Daimyō of Ōzu; 1864–1871 | Abolished |
