= Nanbu Nobunao =

- 南部 信直
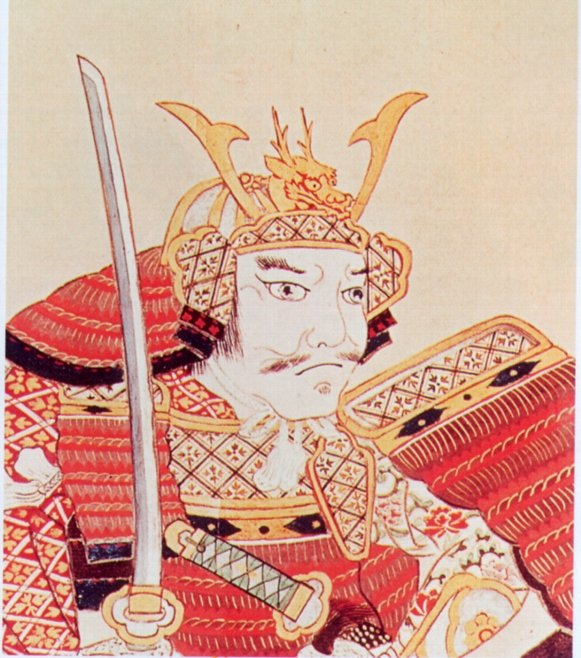
- Preceded by: Nanbu Harutsugu
- Succeeded by: Nanbu Toshinao

Personal details
- Born: April 1, 1546 Iwate, Iwate, Japan
- Died: November 22, 1599 (aged 53) Kunohe Castle, Japan
- Resting place: Sanko-in, Nanbu, Aomori, Japan
- Spouse: daughter of Nanbu Harumasa

Nanbu Nobunao (南部 信直; 1 April 1546 – 22 November 1599) was a Sengoku period Japanese samurai, and daimyō and the 26th hereditary chieftain of the Nanbu clan. His courtesy title was Daizen Daibu, and his Court rank was Junior Fourth Rank, Lower Grade.

Nobunao was the second son of Nanbu Masayasu, the 22nd chieftain of the Nanbu clan, and was born at the clan’s Ikatai Castle in what is now the town of Iwate in 1546. In 1565, he was adopted by his cousin, the 24th chieftain of the Nanbu clan Nanbu Harumasa to be his heir, and resided at Sannohe Castle. In 1566 and 1568 he successfully defended the clan’s territory in Kazuno against incursions by the forces of Andō Chikasue.

In 1570, one of Harumasa’s concubines gave birth to a biological son, Nanbu Harutsugu. Nobunao remained heir, but in 1576, Nobunao’s wife (the daughter of Harumasa) died. Fearing his position had been perhaps fatally undermined, Nobunao formally renounced his position as heir and went into hiding, taking refuge at Ne Castle with the Hachinohe branch of the clan. In 1582, Harumasa died and Harutsugu became 25th chieftain. Harutsugu then died within a year, possibly of smallpox, although it was widely rumored that he had been assassinated by Nobunao. With Harutsugu’s death, the various branches of the Nanbu clan decided to make Nobunao the 26th chieftain. However, this decision was opposed by a faction of the clan led by Kunohe Masazane, a noted warrior who felt that his blood ties to the succession were stronger.

In 1590, during the Siege of Odawara Nobunao led a force of 1000 men, primarily from Sannohe and Hachinohe, and pledged fealty to Toyotomi Hideyoshi. In return, he was confirmed as daimyō of his existing holdings in northern Mutsu province (the districts of Nukanobu, Hei, Kazuno, Kuji, Iwate, Shiwa and Tōno). However, since the Ōura clan had already pledged fealty to Hideyoshi before Nobunao, he was denied control over Tsugaru, which had been seized by the Ōura from the Nanbu in 1571. Hideoyoshi subsequently sent a huge army to quell the Kunohe Rebellion which secured Nobunao in his position. Nobunao was subsequently awarded with the additional territories of Hienuki and Waga as compensation for the loss of Tsugaru. Although his territory was vast geographically, it had an assessed kokudaka of only 100,000 koku, as much of the area was not suitable for growing rice.

In 1592, Hideyoshi ordered Nobunao to Nagoya in Hizen Province to provide 1000 troops for the invasion of Korea. However, he and his forces were never given the order to cross over, and subsequently returned home. Nobunao relocated his seat from Sannohe Castle to the more central location of Morioka, and began work on Morioka Castle and its surrounding castle town in 1592. He did not live to see its completion, but died at Kunohe Castle in 1599.

He was succeeded by his son, Nanbu Toshinao, who became the 1st daimyō of Morioka Domain under the Tokugawa shogunate.
