= Ōzu Castle =

Coordinates: 33°30′34″N 132°32′28″E

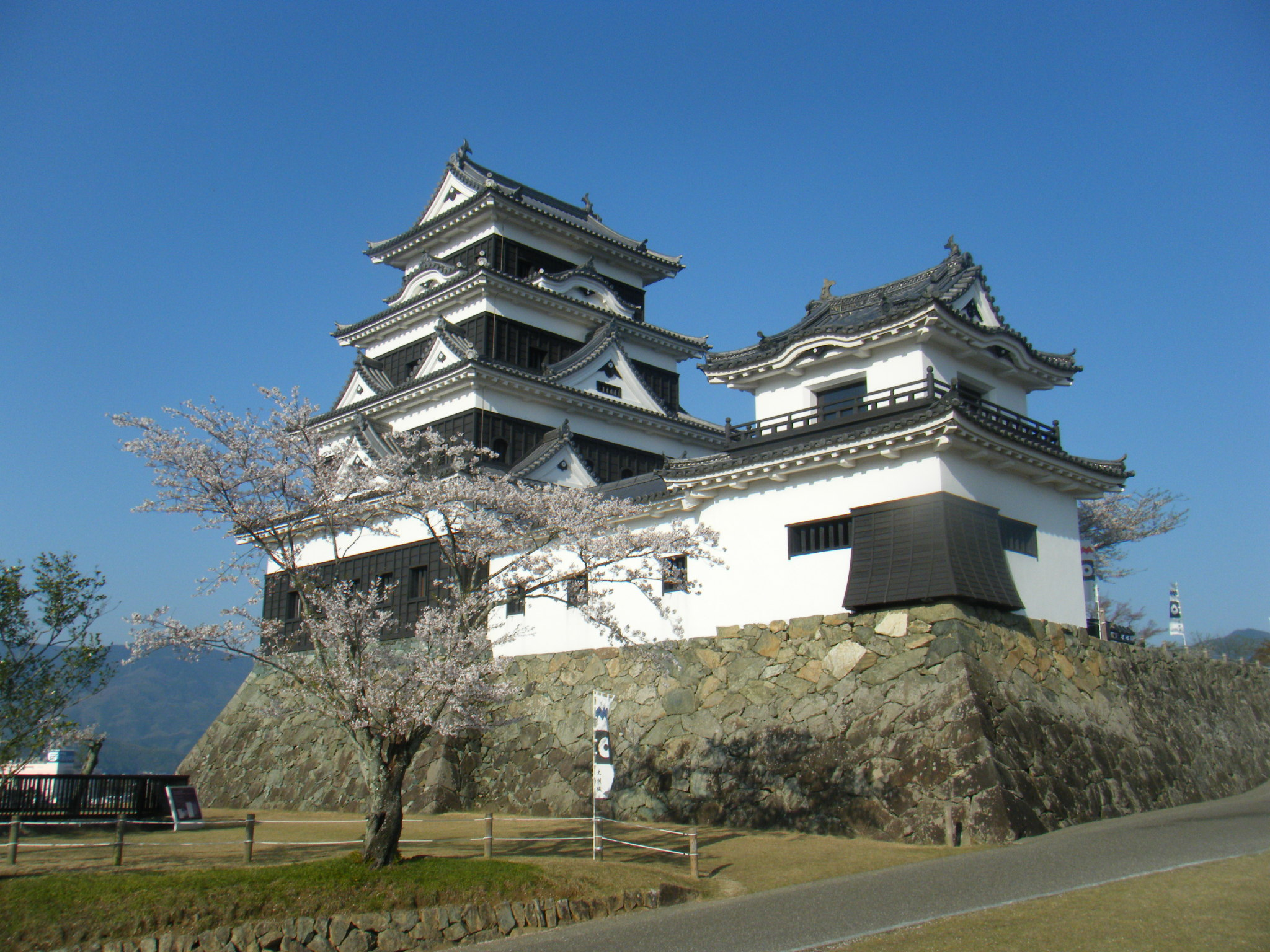
Ōzu castle main keep and the Kōran yagura

Ōzu Castle (大洲城, Ōzu-jō), also known as Jizōgatake Castle (地蔵ヶ嶽城, Jizō-ga-take-jō), is a castle located in Ōzu, Ehime Prefecture, Japan. The earliest recorded defensive structures date back to the beginning of the 14th century and were supposedly built by Utsunomiya Toyofusa. In 1888, deterioration of the castle keep (天守, tenshu) led to its demolition; it was later rebuilt in 2004 according to traditional construction methods.

== History ==
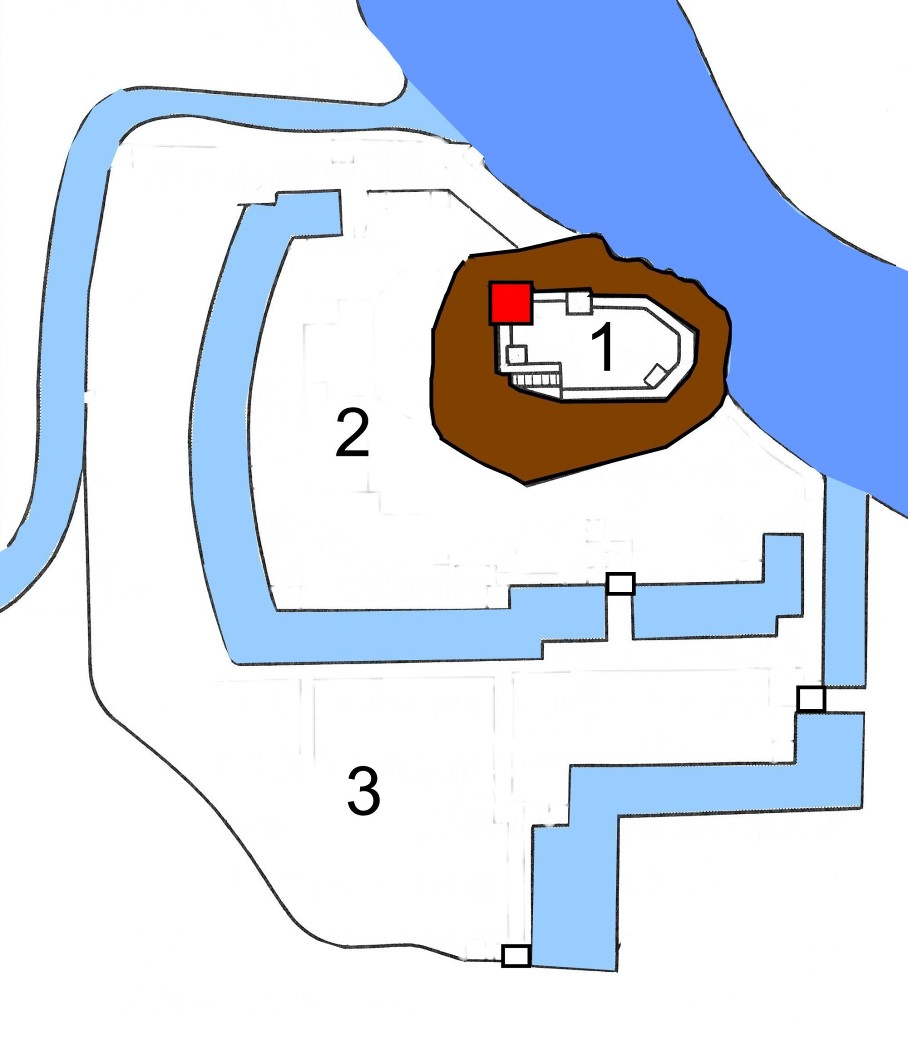
Layout plan of the castle

Local records state that, by 1331, barricades and small fortresses punctuated the Jizōgatake, the strategic mound which overlooks the river Hiji (肱川, Hiji-kawa). The more elaborate defensive compound as it stands today, was erected sometime between 1585–1617. Toyotomi Hideyoshi and Tokugawa Ieyasu's campaigns to unify Japan brought with them a continuous state of change to the rulers of Ōzu (大洲藩, Ōzu-han). These included the daimyō (feudal lord) Wakisaka Yasuharu, Kobayakawa Takakage, Toda Katsutaka, and Tōdō Takatora. Takatora was a castle designer of some renown and is believed to have been the major contributor to the overall outline of the current structure.

In 1617, Katō Sadayasu from Yonago province, took possession of Ōzu. The Katō clan retained control of the domain over the span of 13 generations, until the beginning of the Meiji Restoration which began in 1868.

During the Meiji era (1868–1912), abandoned and left at the mercy of the elements, the castle deteriorated rapidly. After 20 years of neglect, in 1888, the main keep was on the verge of collapse and was thus demolished. Nonetheless, its two surrounding turrets (櫓, yagura), Koran and Daidokoro, were left intact. These turrets, built in the late Edo period (1603–1868), as well as the turrets named Owata and Minami Sumi were marked as Important Cultural Property in 1957 by the Agency for Cultural Affairs of the Japanese Government.

=== Recent developments ===
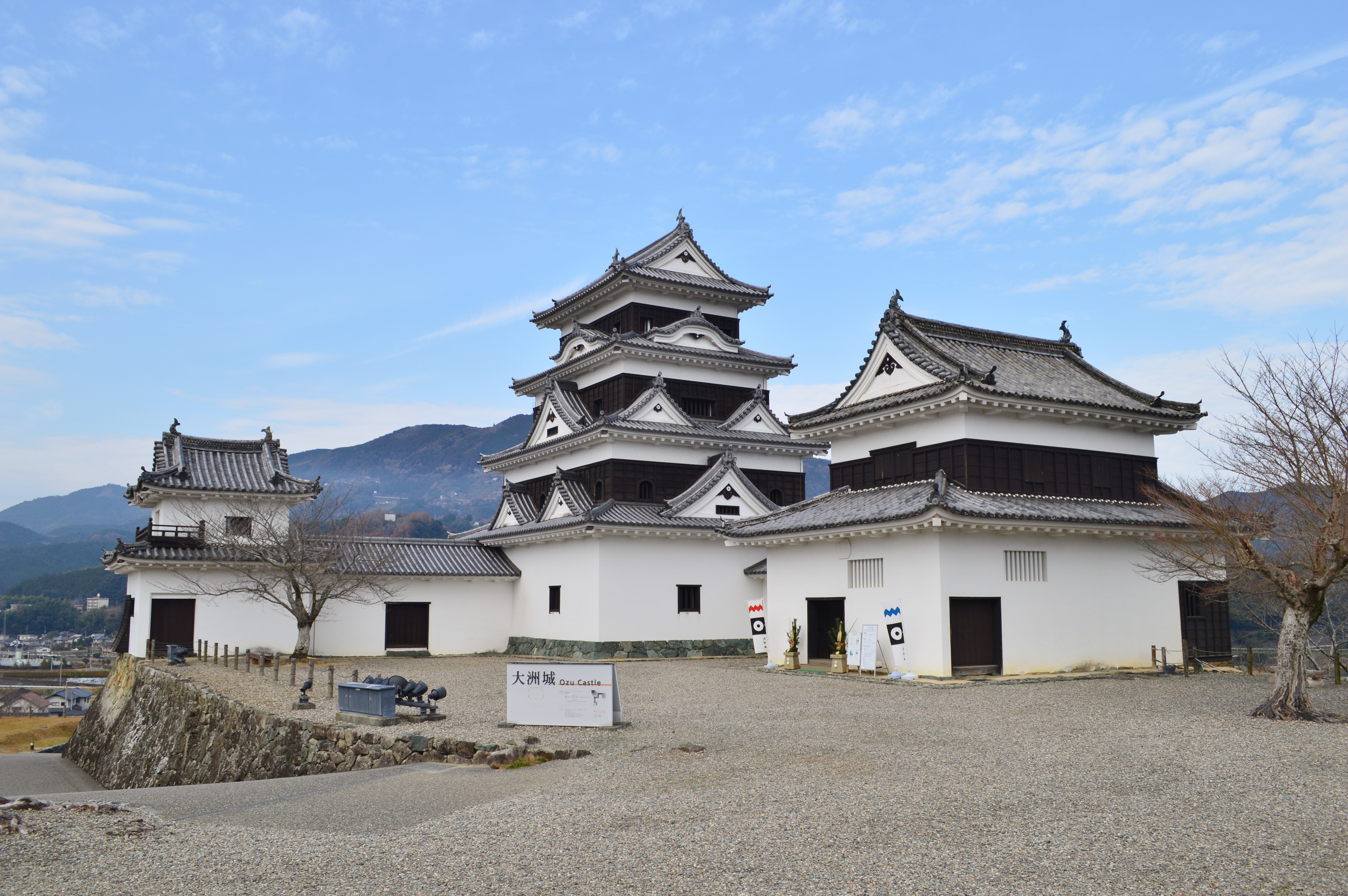
from right: Daidokoro, main keep, Kōran yagura

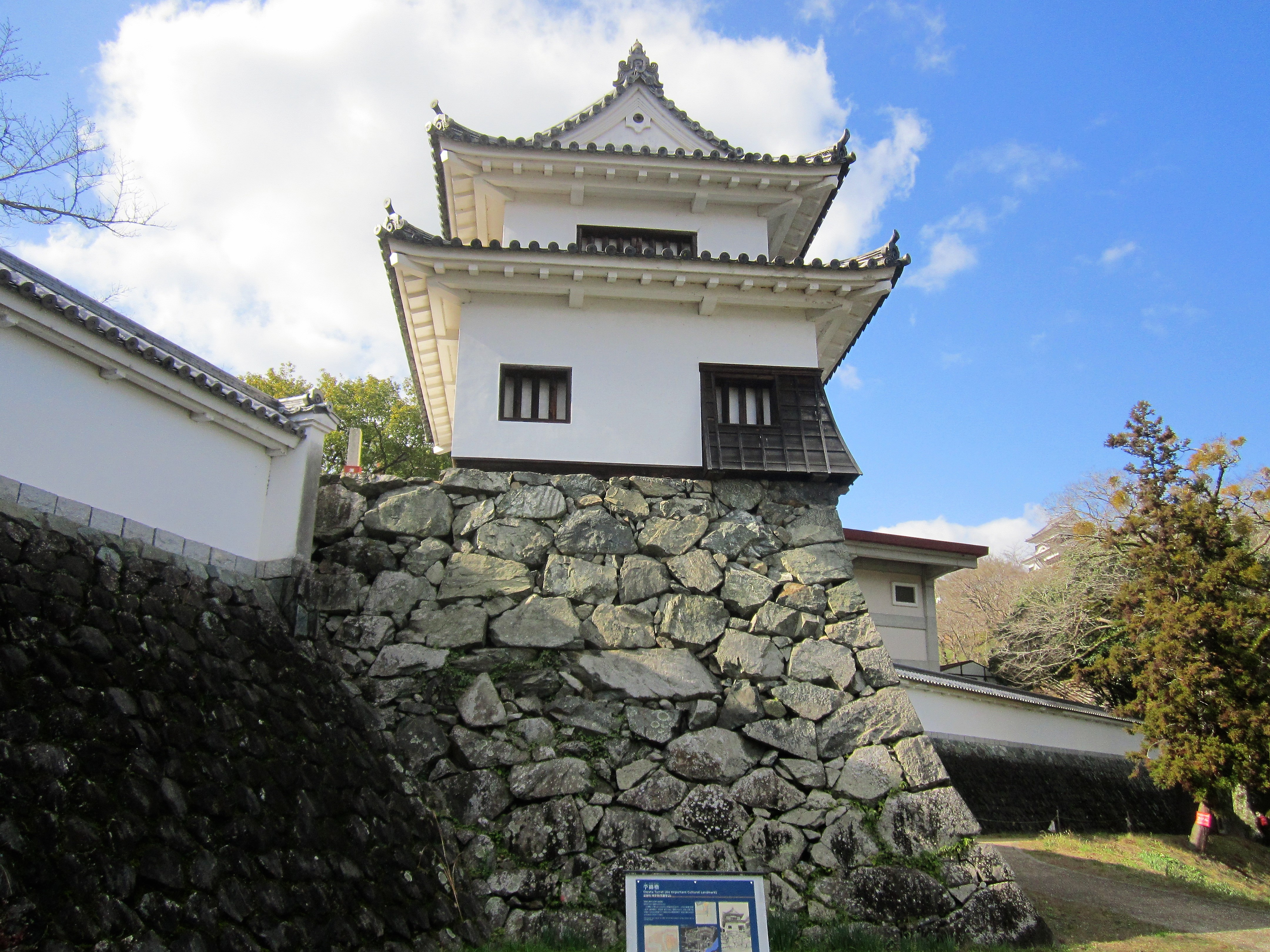
Ōwata yagura

In 2004, efforts by local citizens and city officials culminated in the construction of a new keep at a cost of 1.6 billion JPY (roughly equivalent to USD 10,7 million in 2004).

Old photographs, maps and the discovery of an old model depicting the castle's original structure allowed for a historically faithful reconstruction while traditional assembling techniques and natural materials were employed. The focus on historical accuracy supposedly eased the construction efforts while the project also gave new life to otherwise dying forms of specialized craftmanship such as carpenters and blacksmiths.

At a height of 19.15 m (62 ft 10 in), it stands as the highest timber structure to have been erected since the enactment of the first post-war building standards law (建築基準法, kenchiku kijun hō) in 1950.

The castle is open to visitors and in an attempt to revive the local economy through tourism, overnight stays are also possible.

== Images ==
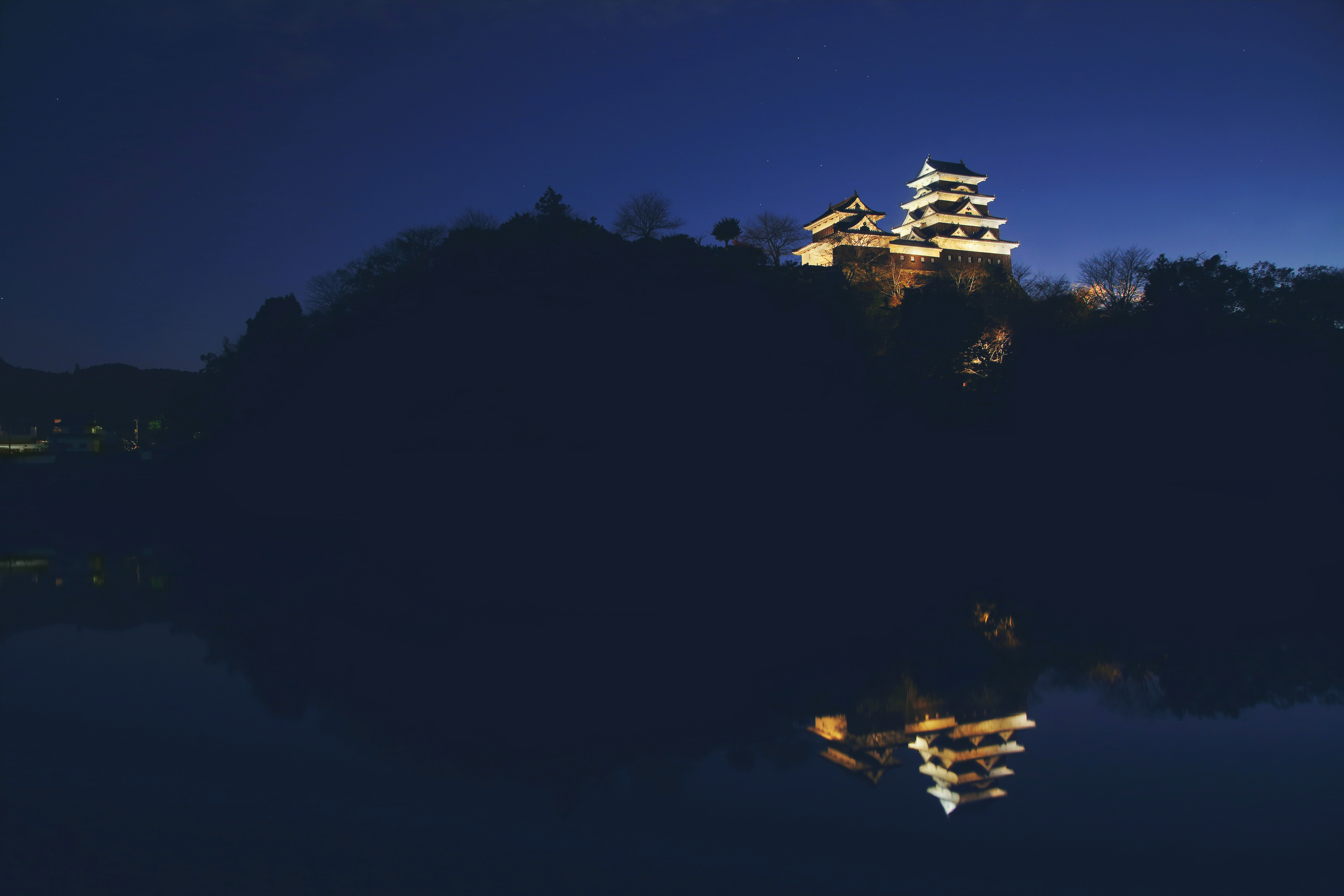
Ōzu Castle & Hiji River at dusk

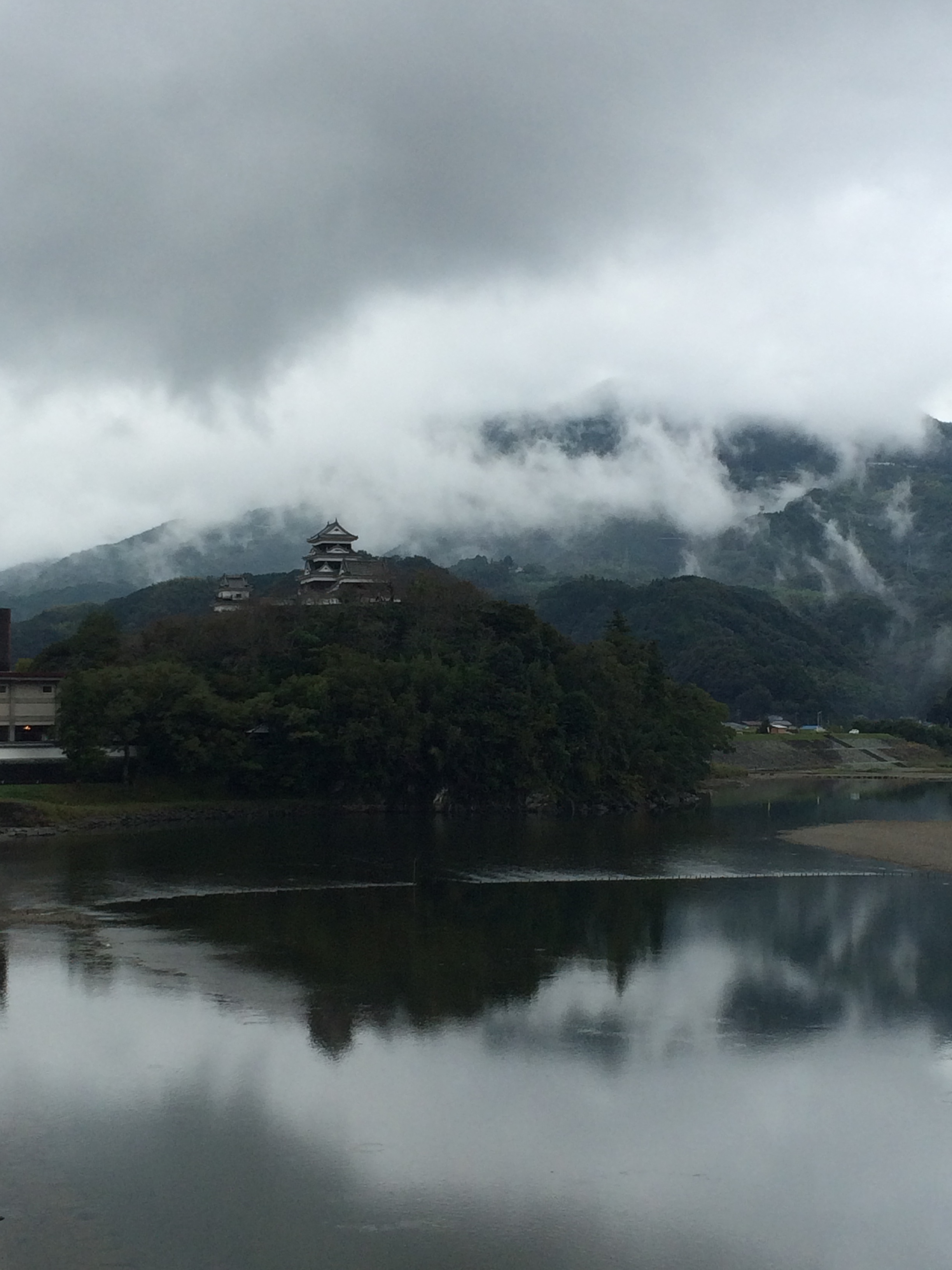
Ōzu Castle and Hiji River

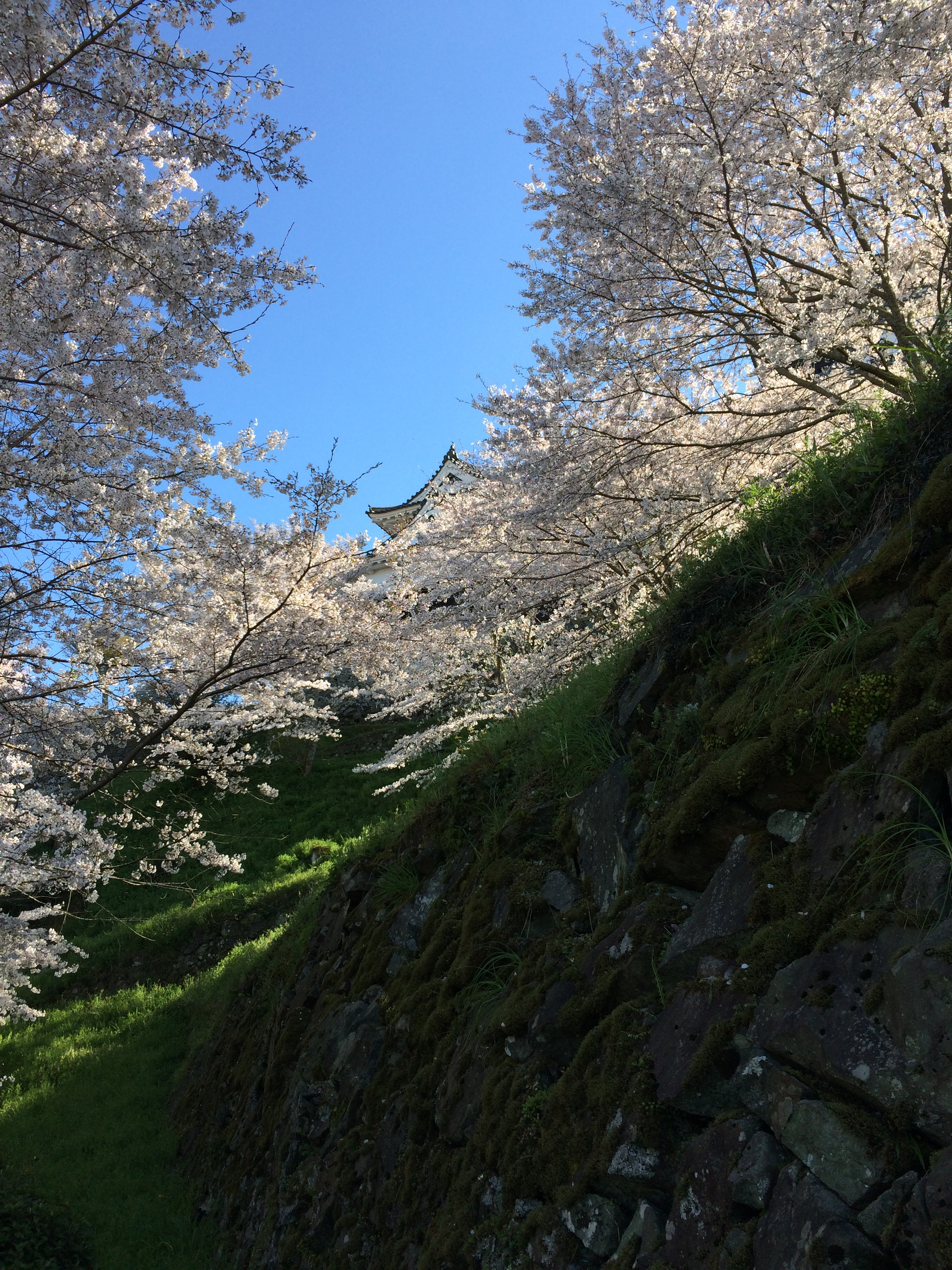
Cherry blossom at Ōzu Castle

== See also ==
- Japan's Top 100 Castles
