= Nanbu Nobuyuki =

Viscount Nambu Nobuyuki
- 南部信順
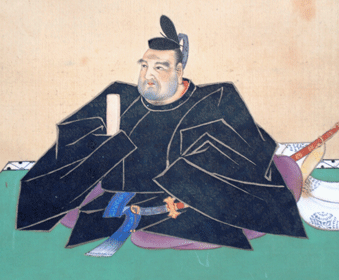
- Nambu Nobuyuki, pre-Meiji restoration

9th Daimyō of Hachinohe Domain
- In office 1842–1868
- Monarchs: Shōgun: Tokugawa Ieyoshi; Tokugawa Iesada; Tokugawa Iemochi; Tokugawa Yoshinobu
- Preceded by: Nanbu Nobumasa
- Succeeded by: < position abolished >

Imperial Governor of Hachinohe
- In office 1869–1871
- Monarch: Emperor Meiji

Personal details
- Born: March 2, 1814
- Died: March 28, 1872 (aged 58)
- Spouse(s): Tsuruhime, daughter of Nanbu Nobumasa
- Domestic partner(s): Fuki, daughter of an Edo merchant
- Parent: Shimazu Shigehide (father)

Nanbu Nobuyuki (南部信順, March 2, 1814 – March 28, 1872) was the 9th and final daimyō of Hachinohe Domain in northern Mutsu Province, Honshū, Japan (modern-day Aomori Prefecture). Before the Meiji Restoration, his courtesy title was Tōtōmi-no-kami, and his Court rank was Junior Fourth Rank, Lower Grade.

== Biography ==
Nanbu Nobuyuki was born as the 14th son of Shimazu Shigehide, daimyō of Satsuma Domain. In 1838, Hachinohe Domain made it known that it was looking for an heir to Nanbu Naomasa. Approaches were made to Nakatsu Domain, Fukuoka Domain and Maruoka Domain, but with the small kokudaka of Hachinohe Domain, there was no interest; however, in Satsuma Domain there was a surfeit of male heirs and the domain was looking to both expand its influence and to cut its expenses. In 1838, his adoption was official recognised in a formal audience with Shōgun Tokugawa Ieyoshi and he became daimyō of Hachinohe Domain in 1842 on the death of Nanbu Nobumasa. During the Bakumatsu period, Nanbu Nobuyuki sided with the Tokugawa shogunate against the Satchō Alliance, and during the Boshin War, took his domain into the Ōuetsu Reppan Dōmei. However, his allegiance to the Tokugawa clan over his own relatives in Satsuma was somewhat uncertain, and he maintained a secret diplomacy with pro-imperial Kubota Domain, which enabled the domain to survive the Meiji Restoration without loss of status. He was appointed domain governor under the new Meiji government on June 22, 1868. With the abolition of the han system in 1871 he retired from public life. He died in 1872.

His son, Nanbu Sakinobu (1858–1876) relocated from Hachinohe to Tokyo, but returned to Hachinohe in 1876 due to ill health. He sold the former Hachinohe Domain's Tokyo residence to Princess Kazunomiya Chikako for the sum of 15,000 Yen in an attempt to rectify the clan's failing finances. His son, Nanbu Toshinari (1872–1950) received the peerage title of viscount under the kazoku peerage system in 1884.
