= Hachinohe Domain =

Japanese historical feudal domain

Hachinohe Domain 八戸藩
- Domain of Japan
- 1664–1871
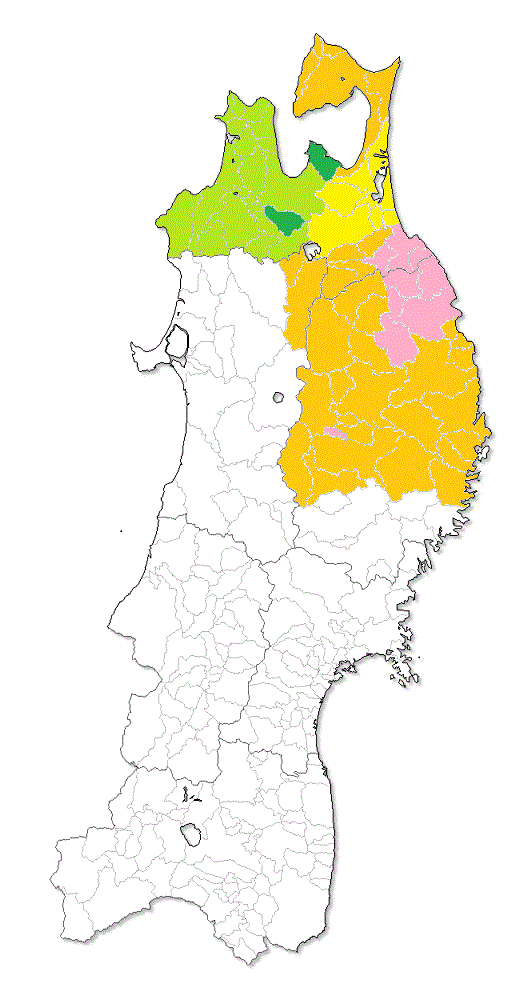
- Map of Nanbu and Tsugaru clan holdings in the late Edo period. Morioka Domain in orange, Hachinohe Domain in pink and Shichinohe Domain in yellow; lands of the rival Tsugaru Domain are in green
- Capital: Hachinohe Castle
- Area
  - Coordinates: 40°30′53.1″N 141°29′16.3″E
  - Type: Daimyō
- Historical era: Edo period
  - Split from Morioka Domain: 1664
  - Disestablished: 1871
Preceded by	Succeeded by
Morioka Domain	Hachinohe Prefecture
- Today part of: Aomori Prefecture; Iwate Prefecture

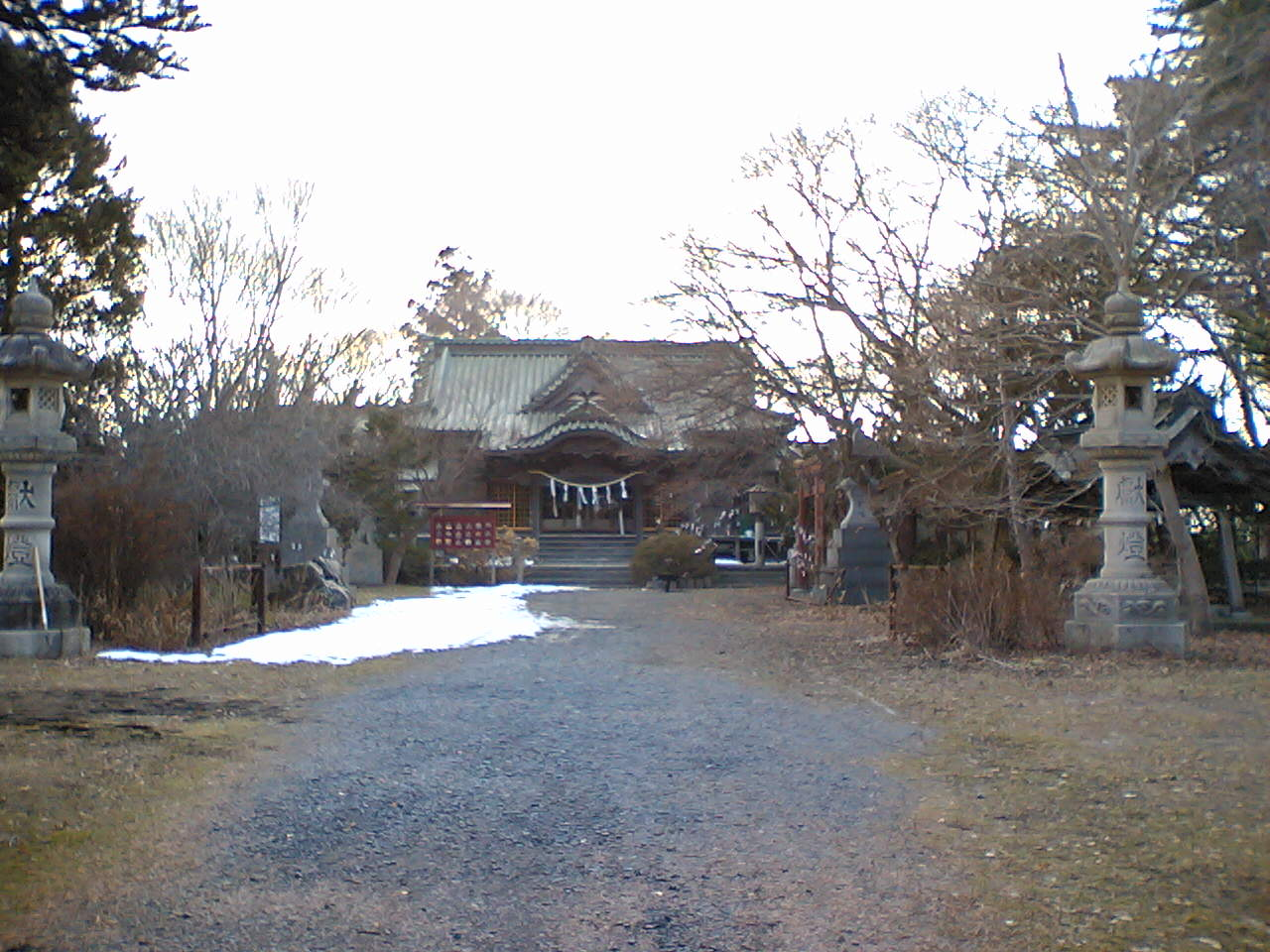
Miyagi-jinja in Hachinohe, on the site of Hachinohe Castle

Hachinohe Domain (八戸藩, Hachinohe-han) was a tozama feudal domain of Edo period Japan It is located in Mutsu Province, in northern Honshū. The domain was centered at Hachinohe Castle, located in the center of what is now the city of Hachinohe in Aomori Prefecture.

== History ==
On the death of the 2nd daimyō of Morioka Domain, Nanbu Shigenao while under house arrest in Edo, the Tokugawa shogunate intervened in the succession and by order of Shōgun Tokugawa Ietsuna divided the 100,000 koku domain into Morioka Domain (80,000 koku) and Hachinohe Domain (20,000 koku). Hachinohe Domain thus had a somewhat ambiguous status in that it is sometimes regarded as a sub-domain of Morioka Domain although it had not been created by the Nanbu clan. It was also subject to the normal sankin kotai regulations, and was allowed to maintain a castle (which was normally permitted only to independent domains).

During official investigations into the untimely deaths of its first two daimyō. Morioka Domain insisted that Hachinohe was not part of their territory and therefore not their responsibility. Furthermore, in 1812, when the domain's residence in Edo burned down, and the 10th daimyō of Morioka Domain, Nanbu Toshitaka, refused to assist with its rebuilding, citing the "independence" of Hachinohe.

In July 1871, with the abolition of the han system, Hachinohe Domain became Hachinohe Prefecture, and was merged into the newly created Aomori Prefecture in September 1871.

== List of daimyō ==
- Nambu clan (Tozama) 1664–1871

	Name	Tenure	Courtesy title	Court Rank	kokudaka
1	Nanbu Naofusa (南部直房)	1664–1668	Saemon-no-suke (左衛門佐)	Junior 5th Rank, Lower Grade (従五位下)	20,000 koku
2	Nanbu Naomasa (南部直政)	1668–1699	Tōtōmi-no-kami (遠江守)	Junior 5th Rank, Lower Grade (従五位下)	20,000 koku
3	Nanbu Michinobu (南部通信)	1699–1716	Tōtōmi-no-kami (遠江守)	Junior 5th Rank, Lower Grade (従五位下)	20,000 koku
4	Nanbu Hironobu (南部広信)	1716–1741	Kai-no-kami (甲斐守)	Junior 5th Rank, Lower Grade (従五位下)	20,000 koku
5	Nanbu Nobuoki (南部信興)	1741–1765	Saemon-no-suke (左衛門佐)	Junior 5th Rank, Lower Grade (従五位下)	20,000 koku
6	Nanbu Nobuyori (南部信依)	1765–1781	Kai-no-kami (甲斐守)	Junior 5th Rank, Lower Grade (従五位下)	20,000 koku
7	Nanbu Nobufusa (南部信房)	1781–1796	Ise-no-kami (伊勢守)	Junior 5th Rank, Lower Grade (従五位下)	20,000 koku
8	Nanbu Nobumasa (南部信真)	1796–1842	Saemon-no-suke (左衛門佐)	Junior 5th Rank, Lower Grade (従五位下)	20,000 koku
9	Nanbu Nobuyuki (南部信順)	1842–1871	Tōtōmi-no-kami (遠江守), Jijū (侍従)	Junior 4th Rank, Lower Grade (従四位下)	20,000 koku

=== Nanbu Naofusa ===
Nanbu Naofusa (南部直房; 1628 – September 30, 1668) was the 1st daimyō of Hachinohe Domain. He was the 7th son of Nanbu Toshinao, the 1st daimyō of Morioka Domain, and was originally named Nakasato Naiyoshi (中里直好). In 1664, his elder brother, Nanbu Shigenao (the 2nd daimyō of Morioka Domain) died while under house arrest in Edo without an heir. The Tokugawa shogunate decided to divide the 100,000 koku Morioka Domain into two parts, with 20,000 koku forming a domain based at Hachinohe Castle under Nanbu Naofusa. His courtesy title was Saemon-no-suke, and his Court rank was Junior Fifth Rank, Lower Grade. He died four years later at age 41 under circumstances so suspicious that the shogunate sent investigators. The investigators could find no proof that Morioka Domain was involved; and Morioka Domain strongly contended at the time that Hachinohe was not a subsidiary, but was completely independent and therefore not their responsibility.

=== Nanbu Naomasa ===
Nanbu Naomasa (南部直政; June 2, 1661 – April 15, 1699) was the 2nd daimyō of Hachinohe Domain. He was the eldest son of Nanbu Naofusa and became daimyō in 1668 at age 7 on the death of his father. His courtesy title was Tōtōmi-no-kami, and his Court rank was Junior Fifth Rank, Lower Grade. In 1672, an agreement on borders was made with Morioka Domain. Naomasa was noted as a scholar; however a series of crop failures due to inclement weather occurred in the Enpō era (1673–1680) caused economic problems for the domain, which was compounded by the expenses needed for sankin-kōtai, which was imposed on the domain by the Tokugawa shogunate in recognition of its “independent” status. He served as a sobayōnin (側用人) in the shogunal administration in 1688 and 1689. As of 1695, the first survey was made of Hachinohe Domain, which recorded a population of 58,507. He died in 1699 at age 39. As with his father, he was possibly poisoned by agents from Morioka Domain, although this was never proven. His wife was a daughter of Nanbu Yukinobu. His grave is at the temple of Konchi-in in Minato, Tokyo.

=== Nanbu Michinobu ===
Nanbu Michinobu (南部通信; March 29, 1673 – October 9, 1716) was the 3rd daimyō of Hachinohe Domain. He was the fourth son of Nanbu Shigenobu, the 3rd daimyō of Morioka Domain and was posthumously adopted as heir to Nanbu Naomasa. His courtesy title was Tōtōmi-no-kami, and his Court rank was Junior Fifth Rank, Lower Grade. He was a multitalented person, noted for his knowledge of literature, horsemanship, the Japanese tea ceremony, waka poetry, and kemari. He also codified the laws of the domain and suppressed inflation. However, in the famine of 1703, it was recorded that 16,745 people died in Hachinohe. This was followed by an earthquake and tsunami in 1707. His wife was the daughter of Matsudaira Nobutsuna, daimyō of Sasayama Domain. He died at the age of 44 and his grave is at the temple of Nanshu-ji in Hachinohe.

=== Nanbu Hironobu ===
Nanbu Hironobu (南部広信; April 16, 1704 – June 14, 1741) was the 4th daimyō of Hachinohe Domain. He was the eldest son of Nanbu Michinobu, and became daimyō at the age of seven on the death of his father. His courtesy title was Kai-no-kami, and his Court rank was Junior Fifth Rank, Lower Grade. During his tenure, a complete survey of the domain's lands was undertaken, and the Hachinohe Sansha Matsuri festival began; however, the domain continued to be plagued by frequent crop failures due to inclement weather. Per a census in 1732, the domain had 56,401 inhabitants He died at the age of 33, and his grave is at the temple of Konchi-in in Minato, Tokyo.

=== Nanbu Nobuoki ===
Nanbu Nobuoki (南部信興; October 27, 1725 – September 29, 1773) was the 5th daimyō of Hachinohe Domain. He was the eldest son of Nanbu Hironobu, and became daimyō at the age of 16 on the death of his father. His courtesy title was Tōtōmi-no-kami (later Saemon-no-suke), and his Court rank was Junior Fifth Rank, Lower Grade. His wife was the daughter of Oda Nagaaki, daimyō of Shibamura Domain. During a famine in 1749, it was recorded that 3000 people died. Further famines occurred in 1753 and 1756, by which time the population of Hachinohe had dropped to 45,367. This was followed by large earthquakes, tsunami and further crop failures in 1762 and 1763. Nobuoki retired from public life in 1765 and died in 1773.

=== Nanbu Nobuyori ===
Nanbu Nobuyori (南部信依; March 20, 1747 – July 27, 1781) was the 6th daimyō of Hachinohe Domain. He was the eldest son of Nanbu Nobuoki, and became daimyō in 1765 at the age of 18 on the retirement of his father. His courtesy title was Kai-no-kami, and his Court rank was Junior Fifth Rank, Lower Grade. He established a han school in 1770 to improve the calibre of his samurai. In 1769 caused great damage. He fell ill in February 1781, and turned the domain over to his son. he died a few months later at the age of 35. His grave is at is at the temple of Konchi-in in Minato, Tokyo.

=== Nanbu Nobufusa ===
Nanbu Nobufusa (南部信房; August 1, 1765 – June 7, 1835) was the 7th daimyō of Hachinohe Domain. He was the eldest son of Nanbu Nobuyori, and was presented in formal audience to Shōgun Tokugawa Ieharu in November 1780. He became daimyō in 1781 at the age of 16 on the death of his father. His courtesy title was Ise-no-kami, and his Court rank was Junior Fifth Rank, Lower Grade. His wife was the daughter of Mizoguchi Naoyasu, the daimyō Shibata Domain. He was a noted haikai poet. During his tenure, the domain suffered severely from the Great Tenmei famine of 1783 during which 30,000 of the 65,000 inhabitants died and he was forced to borrow large sums of money from local merchants. Unable to repay these debts, Naoyori was forced to raise a number of the merchants to samurai status. A further famine occurred in 1795 causing a peasant's revolt. He turned the domain over to his brother in 1796, and retired from public life. He died in 1835 at age 59.

=== Nanbu Nobumasa ===
Nanbu Nobumasa (南部信真; March 6, 1780 – February 14, 1847) was the 8th daimyō of Hachinohe Domain. He was the third son of Nanbu Nobuyori, and became daimyō in 1796 at the age of 16 on the retirement of his brother Nanbu Nobufusa. His courtesy title was ‘’Saemon-no-suke‘', and his Court rank was Junior Fifth Rank, Lower Grade. His wife was the daughter of Okubo Tadaaki, the daimyō of Odawara Domain. He undertook strong measures to rectify the domain's finances, including encouraging the planting of soy beans and the creation of domain monopolies on certain products and industries. The measures were initially successful, albeit highly unpopular, and when the Tenpō famine of 1834 struck, there was a widespread uprising. He retired from public life in 1842 and died in 1847 at age 66.

=== Nanbu Nobuyuki ===
Nambu Nobuyuki (南部信順; March 2, 1814 – March 28, 1872) was the 9th and final daimyō of Hachinohe Domain. He was the 14th son of Shimazu Shigehide, daimyō of Satsuma Domain and was adopted into the Nanbu clan in 1838, officially becoming daimyō of Hachinohe Domain in 1842 on the death of Nanbu Nobumasa. During the Bakumatsu period, he sided with the Tokugawa shogunate against the Satchō Alliance, and during the Boshin War, took his domain into the Ōuetsu Reppan Dōmei. However, his allegiance to the Tokugawa clan over his own relatives in Satsuma was somewhat uncertain, and he maintained a secret diplomacy with pro-imperial Kubota Domain, which enabled the domain to survive the Meiji Restoration without loss of status. He was appointed domain governor under the new Meiji government on June 22, 1868. With the abolition of the han system in 1871 he retired from public life. He died in 1872.

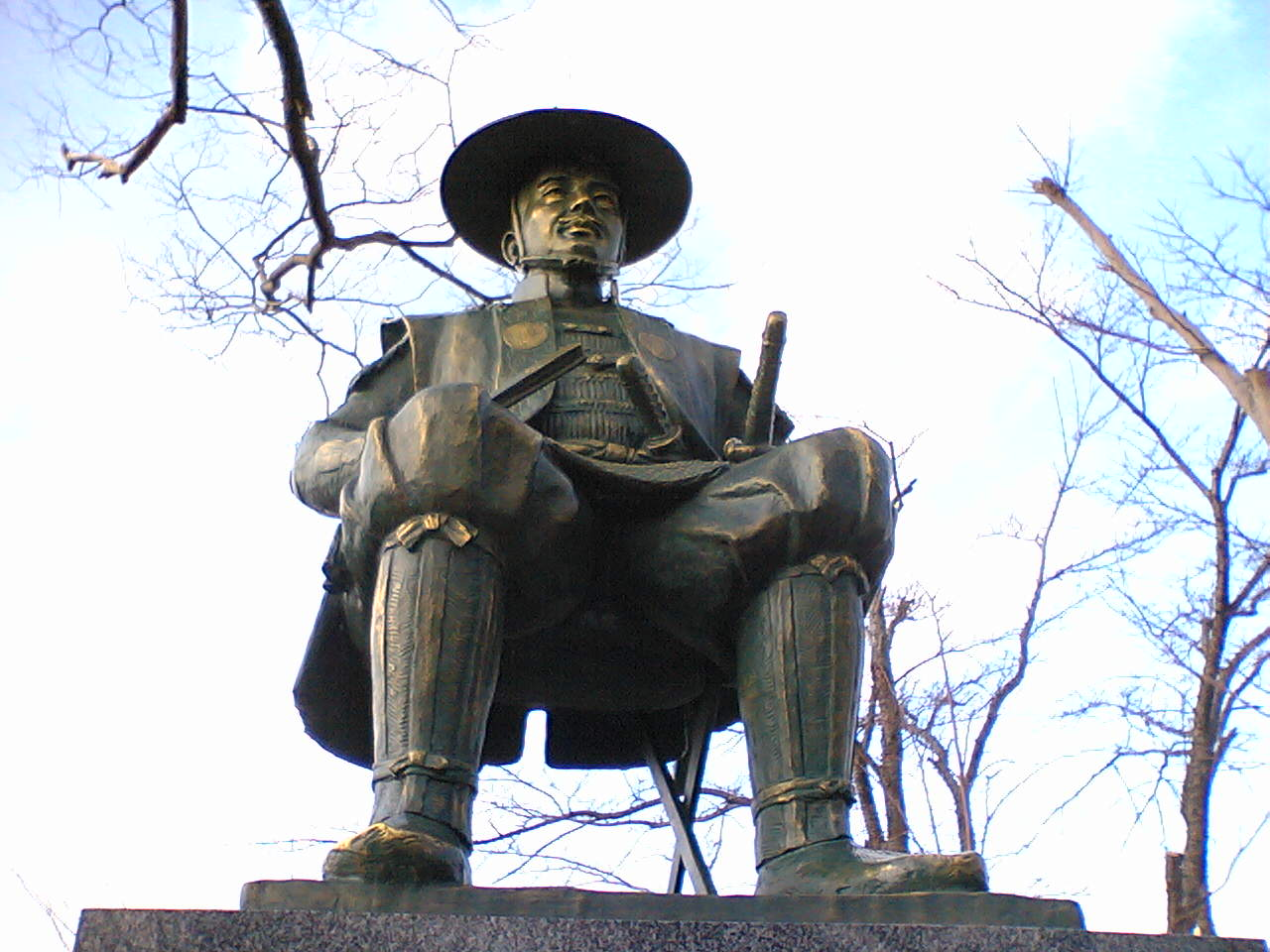
Nanbu Naofusa

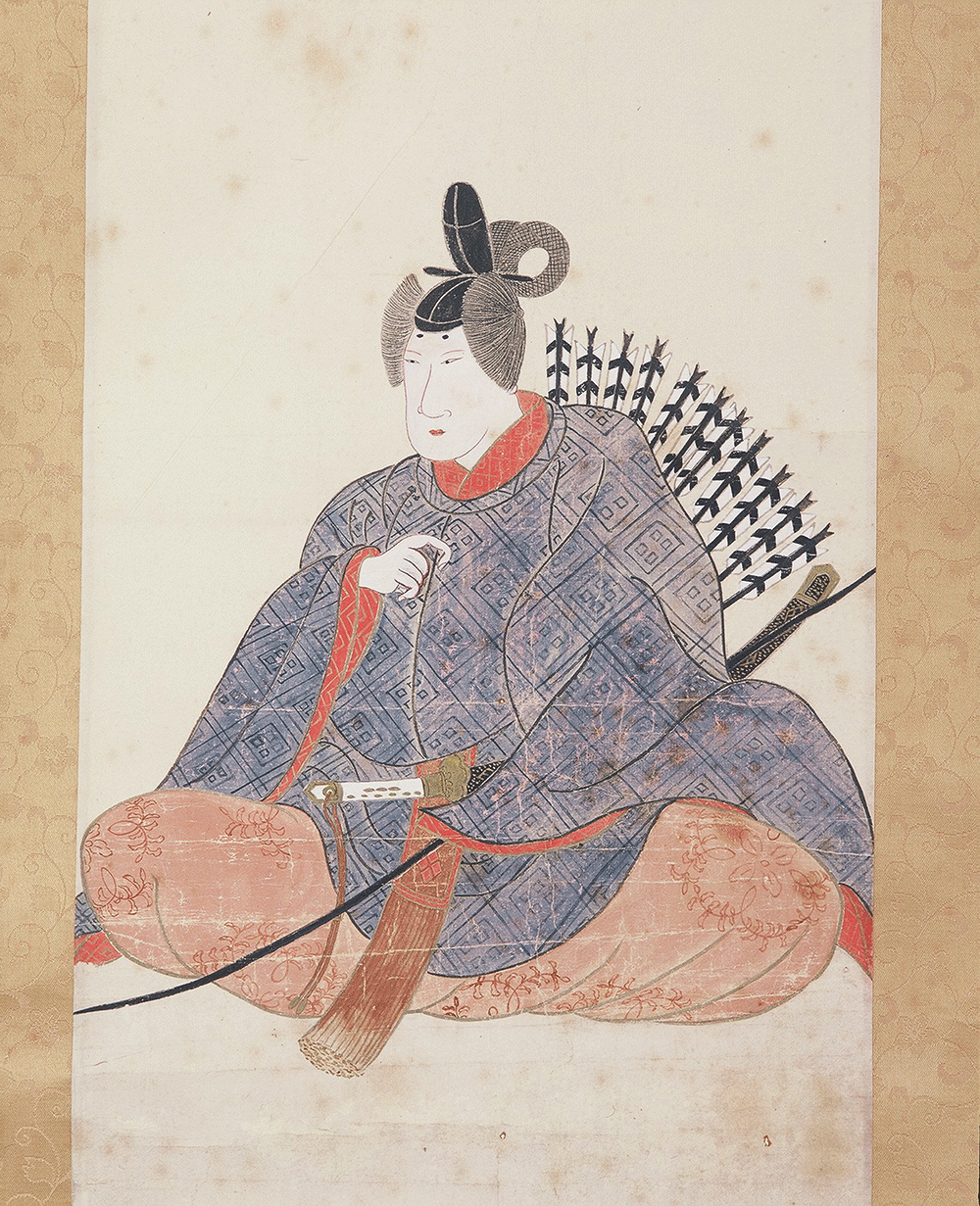
Nanbu Nobuoki

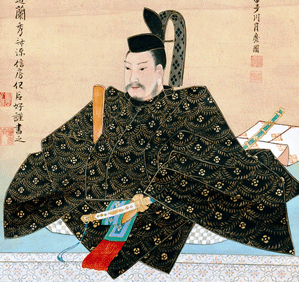
Nanbu Nobufusa

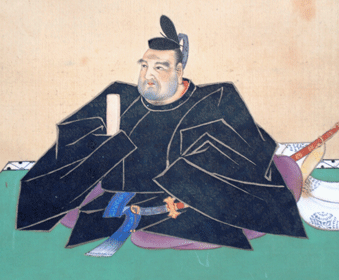
Nanbu Nobuyuki

== Bakumatsu period holdings ==
As with most domains in the han system, Hachinohe Domain consisted of a discontinuous territories calculated to provide the assigned kokudaka, based on periodic cadastral surveys and projected agricultural yields.

- Mutsu Province
  - 41 villages in Sannohe District,
  - 38 villages in Kunohe District
  - 4 villages in Shiwa District

== See also ==
- List of Han
- Nanbu clan
