= Ōzu Domain =

Administrative division in Japan during the Edo period (1608–1871)

Ōzu Domain 大洲藩
- Domain of Japan
- 1608–1871
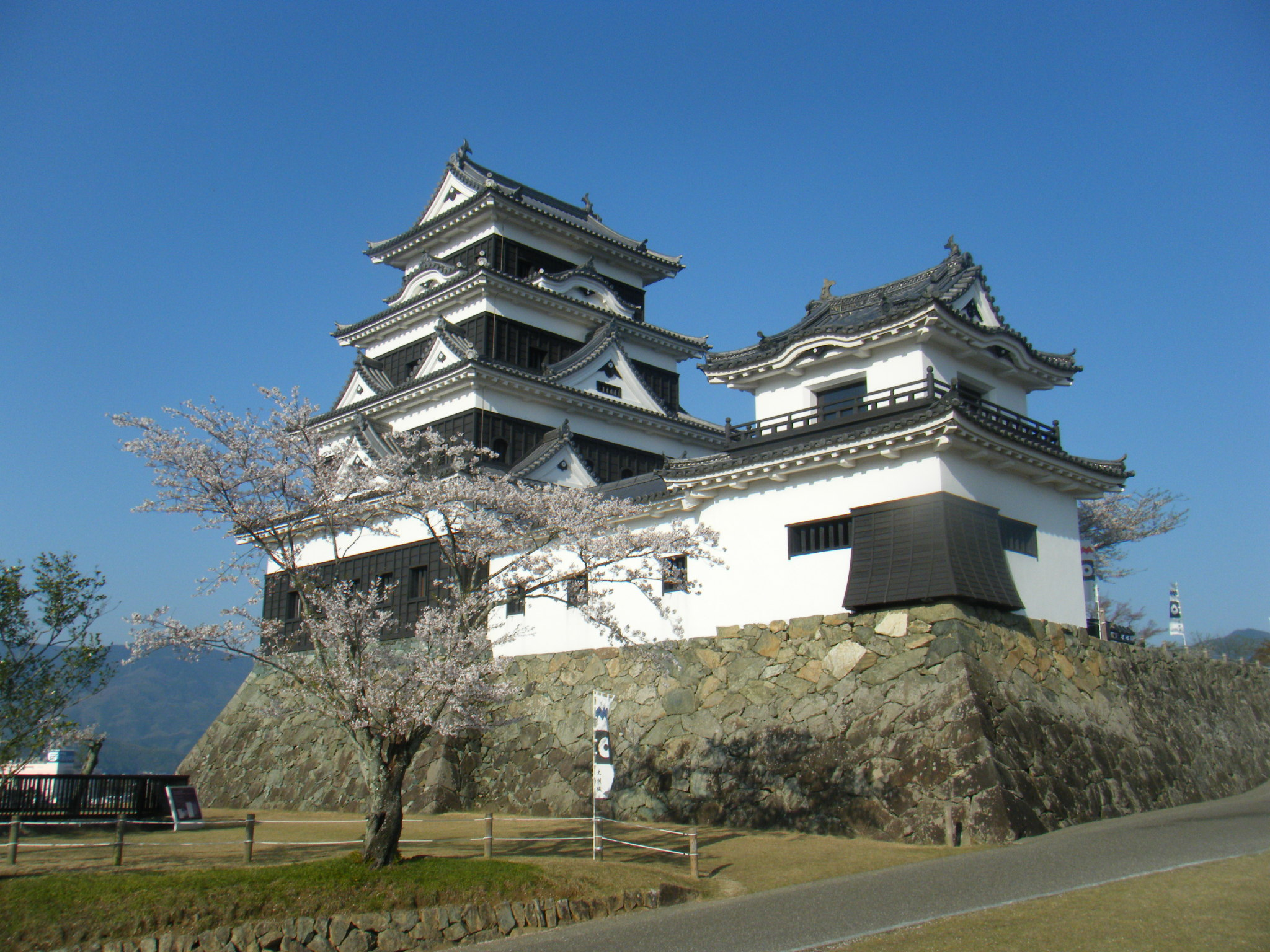
- Ōzu Castle in Ōzu, Ehime

- Mon of the Katō clan
- Capital: Ōzu Castle
- Area
  - Coordinates: 33°30′34.34″N 132°32′28.07″E
- Historical era: Edo period
  - Established: 1608
  - Abolition of the han system: 1871
- Contained within
  - Province: Iyo
- Today part of: Ehime Prefecture

Location of Ōzu Castle
Ōzu Domain (Japan)

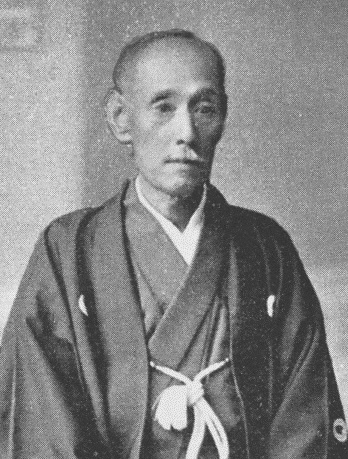
Katō Yasuaki, final daimyō of Ōzu Domain

Ōzu Domain (大洲藩, Ōzu-han) was a feudal domain under the Tokugawa shogunate of Edo period Japan, in what is now western Ehime Prefecture on the island of Shikoku. It was centered around Ōzu Castle, and was ruled throughout its history by the tozama daimyō Katō clan. Ōzu Domain was dissolved in the abolition of the han system in 1871 and is now part of Ehime Prefecture.

== History ==
In the early Edo period, Ōzu was part of the territory of Tōdō Takatora, who had rebuilt Ōzu Castle. In 1608, the Tokugawa shogunate promoted him to Tsu Domain in Ise Province and created the 53,000 koku Ōzu Domain for Wakisaka Yasuharu from Sumoto Domain on Awaji island. In 1617, his son Yasumoto was transferred to Iida Domain in Shinano Province and Ōzu was reassigned to Katō Sadayasu from Yonago Domain, with an increased kokudaka to 66,000 koku. Sadayasu died suddenly in 1623 without formally having appointed an heir, which would normally be cause for attainder; however, his eldest son Katō Yasuaki managed to secure an audience with Shogun Tokugawa Hidetada and was accepted as heir. However, the shogunate also allowed his younger brother, Katō Naoyasu, to carve out a 10,000 koku portion of the estate and to establish Niiya Domain and a cadet branch of the clan. This move was vehemently opposed by Ōzu Domain, and relations between the two branches of the clan was hostile for the next two centuries. Niiya Domain was left in the ambitious position of both being a subsidiary domain of Ōzu and a direct domain under the shogunate.

The Katō clan cultivated a reputation for scholarship. The noted Confucian scholar Nakae Tōju spent his early career as a retainer of the Katō. The domain was also a sponsor of nascent kokugaku studies and expressed strong loyalty to the Imperial house, even from the early Edo Period. In the Bakumatsu period, the domain fought on the imperial side in the 1868 Battle of Toba-Fushimi. Although relatively small domain, it played a large role in Bakumatsu period events. The steamship used by Sakamoto Ryoma's Kaientai, the Iroha-maru, was owned by Ōzu Domain. With the 1871 abolition of the han system Ōzu Domain became "Ōzu Prefecture" and merged with "Uwajima Prefecture" before becoming part of Ehime Prefecture. The Kato clan was awarded the title of viscount user the kazoku peerage system in 1884.

== Holdings at the end of the Edo period ==
As with most domains in the han system, Ōzu Domain consisted of several discontinuous territories calculated to provide the assigned kokudaka, based on periodic cadastral surveys and projected agricultural yields.

- Iyo Province
  - 5 villages in Kazahaya District
  - 49 villages in Ukena District
  - 17 villages in Iyo District
  - 80 villages in Kita District

== List of daimyō ==
#	Name	Tenure	Courtesy title	Court Rank	kokudaka
Wakizaka clan, 1609–1617 (Tozama)
1	Wakizaka Yasuharu (脇坂安治)	1609–1615	Awaji-no-kami (淡路守)	Junior 5th Rank, Lower Grade (従五位下)	53,000 koku
2	Wakizaka Yasumoto (脇坂安元)	1615–1617	Awaji-no-kami (淡路守)	Junior 5th Rank, Lower Grade (従五位下)	53,000 koku
Katō clan, 1617–1871 (Tozama)
1	Katō Sadayasu (加藤貞泰)	1617–1623	Saemon-no-jō (左衛門尉); Sakon-no-taifu (左近大夫)	Junior 5th Rank, Lower Grade (従五位下)	66,000 koku
2	Katō Yasuoki (加藤泰興)	1623–1674	Dewa-no-kami (出羽守)	Junior 5th Rank, Lower Grade (従五位下)	66,000 koku
3	Katō Yasutsune (加藤泰恒)	1674–1715	Tōtōmi-no-kami (遠江守)	Junior 5th Rank, Lower Grade (従五位下)	66,000 koku
4	Katō Yasumune (加藤泰統)	1715–1727	Dewa-no-kami (出羽守)	Junior 5th Rank, Lower Grade (従五位下)	66,000 koku
5	Katō Yasuatsu (加藤泰温)	1727–1745	Tōtōmi-no-kami (遠江守)	Junior 5th Rank, Lower Grade (従五位下)	66,000 koku
6	Katō Yasumichi (加藤泰衑)	1745–1762	Dewa-no-kami (出羽守)	Junior 5th Rank, Lower Grade (従五位下)	66,000 koku
7	Katō Yasutake (加藤泰武)	1762–1768	Dewa-no-kami (出羽守)	Junior 5th Rank, Lower Grade (従五位下)	66,000 koku
8	Katō Yasuyuki (加藤泰行)	1768–1769	Dewa-no-kami (出羽守)	Junior 5th Rank, Lower Grade (従五位下)	66,000 koku
9	Katō Yasutoki (加藤泰候)	1769–1787	Tōtōmi-no-kami (遠江守)	Junior 5th Rank, Lower Grade (従五位下)	66,000 koku
10	Katō Yasuzumi (加藤泰済)	1787–1826	Tōtōmi-no-kami (遠江守)	Junior 5th Rank, Lower Grade (従五位下)	66,000 koku
11	Katō Yasumoto (加藤泰幹)	1826–1853	Tōtōmi-no-kami (遠江守)	Junior 5th Rank, Lower Grade (従五位下)	66,000 koku
12	Katō Yasutomi (加藤泰祉)	1853–1864	Dewa-no-kami (出羽守)	Junior 5th Rank, Lower Grade (従五位下)	66,000 koku
13	Katō Yasuaki (加藤泰秋)	1864–1871	Tōtōmi-no-kami (遠江守)	Junior 4th Rank, Lower Grade (従四位下)	66,000 koku

== See also ==
- List of Han
- Abolition of the han system
