= Nanbu Toshinao =

- 南部 利直
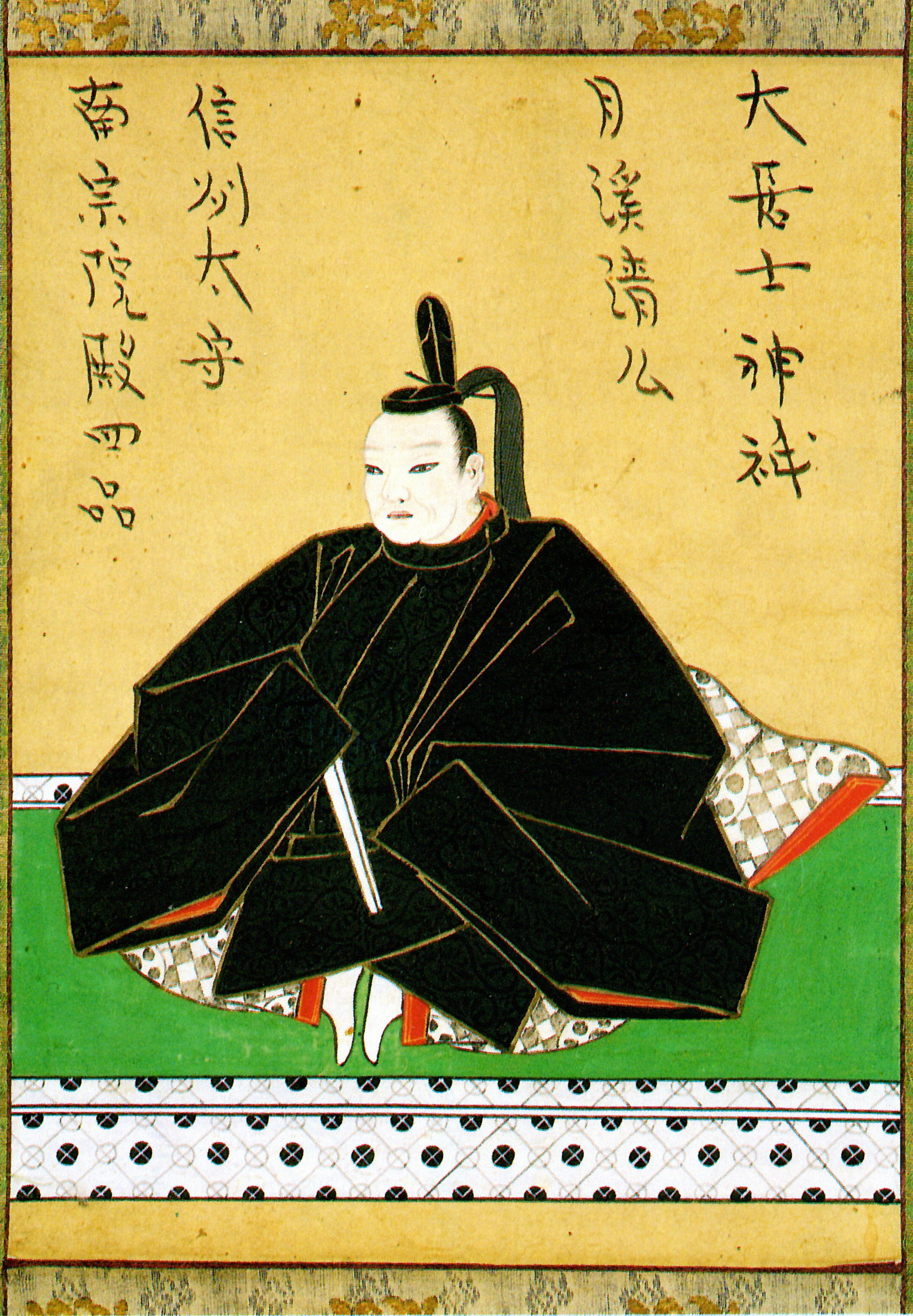
- Born: April 13, 1576; Sannohe District, Aomori, Japan
- Died: October 1, 1632 (aged 56); Edo, Japan
- Burial place: Shōju-ji, Morioka, Iwate, Japan
- Title: Daimyō of Morioka Domain
- Predecessor: Nanbu Nobunao
- Successor: Nanbu Shigenao
- Spouse: daughter of Gamō Ujisato
- Father: Nanbu Nobunao

Nanbu Toshinao (南部 利直; 13 April 1576 – 1 October 1632) was an early Edo period Japanese samurai, and the 1st daimyō of Morioka Domain in northern Japan. He was the 27th hereditary chieftain of the Nanbu clan.

Toshinao was the eldest son of Nanbu Nobunao, and was born at the clan's Tago Castle in Sannohe. In 1590, Nobunao submitted to Toyotomi Hideyoshi during the SIege of Odawara and was confirmed as daimyō of his existing holdings in northern Mutsu province (the districts of Nukanobu, Hei, Kazuno, Kuji, Iwate, Shiwa and Tōno). During the same year Maeda Toshiie, one of Hideyoshi's closest generals, presided over Toshinao's genpuku ceremony, and granted him the kanji of "Toshi" in his name. In 1594, he married the daughter of Gamō Ujisato.

Hideyoshi also helped suppress the Kunohe Rebellion, which enabled Nobunao and Toshinao to unite the many local factions of the Nanbu clan into a more centralized administration. In 1595, Toshinao was awarded Court rank of Junior Fifth Rank, Lower Grade and the formal courtesy title of Shinano-no-kami. Following the death of Toyotomi Hideyoshi in 1598, he drew close to Tokugawa Ieyasu politically.

Upon Nanbu Nobunao's death in 1599, Toshinao became clan chieftain. In the prelude to the Battle of Sekigahara, Tokugawa Ieyasu ordered Toshinao going north to attack Uesugi Kagekatsu in Aizu. During this campaign, Toshinao led the Nanbu forces at the Siege of Hasedō. However, during the Battle of Sekigahara, Date Masamune and Waga Tadachika organised a large scale revolt in the Nanbu southern territories of Waga and Hienuki, which was only suppressed with difficulty in 1601. In 1614, he participated in the Winter Campaign of Siege of Osaka.

As daimyo, Toshinao developed copper mines in his territories, which helped place the domain on a stable financial footing. In 1615, he completed Morioka Castle and the surrounding castle town, and many inhabitants of Sannohe moved south to settle around the new center of power. He is also credited with inventing the regional speciality, wanko soba, while stopping at Hanamaki on his way to Edo for sankin-kōtai. In 1626 he was elevated to Junior Fifth Rank, Lower Grade.

He died at the clan's Sakuradaya residence in Edo in 1632 at the age of 57, and was succeeded by his son, Nanbu Shigenao. His grave was originally at the temple of Shōju-ji in Sannohe, but was later relocated to the Nanbu clan mortuary temple of Tōzen-ji in Morioka.

== Notes ==
Preceded by none	1st (Nanbu) Daimyō of Morioka; 1599–1632	Succeeded by Nanbu Shigenao
