= List of historic sites of Japan (Aomori) =

This list is of the historic sites of Japan located within the Prefecture of Aomori.

== National Historic Sites ==
As of 17 December 2021, twenty-three Sites have been designated as being of national significance (including one *Special Historic Site).

Site	Municipality	Comments	Image	Coordinates	Type	Ref.
*Sannai-Maruyama Site 三内丸山遺跡 Sannai-Maruyama iseki	Aomori	inscribed on the UNESCO World Heritage List as one of the Jōmon Prehistoric Sites in Northern Japan	Sannai-Maruyama Site	40°48′40″N 140°41′55″E	1	108
Akōbō Kofun Cluster 阿光坊古墳群 Akōbō kofun-gun	Oirase	Kofun period tumuli	Akōbō Kofun Cluster	40°36′34″N 141°22′36″E	1	00003536
Kamegaoka Stone Age Site 亀ヶ岡石器時代遺跡 Kamegaoka sekki-jidai iseki	Tsugaru	inscribed on the UNESCO World Heritage List as one of the Jōmon Prehistoric Sites in Northern Japan	Kamegaoka Stone Age Site	40°53′06″N 140°20′22″E	1	97
Goshogawara Sue Pottery Kiln Site 五所川原須恵器窯跡 Goshogawara Sue-ki kama ato	Goshogawara	Heian period kiln ruins		40°45′31″N 140°32′49″E	6	3397
Takayashikidate Site 高屋敷館遺跡 Takayashikidate iseki	Aomori	Heian period settlement ruins	Takayashikidate Site	40°44′13″N 140°35′04″E	1	3276
Ne Castle ruins 根城跡 Ne-jō ato	Hachinohe	Muromachi period	Ne Castle ruins	40°30′22″N 141°27′39″E	2	95
Shichinohe Castle ruins 七戸城跡 Shichinohe-jō ato	Shichinohe	Muromachi period castle ruins	Shichinohe Castle ruins	40°41′52″N 141°08′57″E	2	96
Tosaminato ruins 十三湊遺跡 Tosa minato iseki	Goshogawara	Muromachi period settlement ruins		41°01′43″N 140°19′46″E	1, 2, 6	00003446
Komakino Site 小牧野遺跡 Komakino iseki	Aomori	inscribed on the UNESCO World Heritage List as one of the Jōmon Prehistoric Sites in Northern Japan	Komakino Site	40°44′19″N 141°08′57″E	1	107
Tareyanagi Site 垂柳遺跡 Tareyanagi iseki	Inakadate	Yayoi period rice paddies	Tareyanagi Site	40°37′59″N 140°33′57″E	6	3251
Korekawa Site 是川遺跡 Korekawa iseki	Hachinohe	ICP excavated artefacts; inscribed on the UNESCO World Heritage List as one of the Jōmon Prehistoric Sites in Northern Japan	Korekawa Site	40°28′25″N 141°29′28″E	1	101
Shōjujidate Castle ruins 聖寿寺館跡 Shōjujitate ato	Nanbu	Muromachi period castle ruins	Shōjujitate ruins	40°24′45″N 141°15′54″E	2	3396
Tangotai Kofun cluster 丹後平古墳群 Tangotai kofun	Hachinohe	Kofun period tumuli		40°28′52″N 141°28′01″E	1	3207
Chōshichiyachi Shell Mound 長七谷地貝塚 Chōshichiyachi kaizuka	Hachinohe		Chōshichiyachi Shell Mound	40°34′19″N 141°27′32″E	1	106
Tsugaru Clan Castle Sites 津軽氏城跡 Tsugaru-shi shiro ato	Hirosaki, Ajigasawa	designation includes the sites of Tanesato Castle, Horikoshi Castle, and Hirosaki Castle (pictured)	Tsuruga clan castles	40°36′27″N 140°27′51″E	2	99
Tagoyano Shell Mound 田小屋野貝塚 Tagoyano kaizuka	Tsugaru	site inscribed on the UNESCO World Heritage List as one of the Jōmon Prehistoric Sites in Northern Japan	Tagoyano Shell Mound	40°53′17″N 140°20′21″E	1	98
Futatsumori Site 二ツ森貝塚 Futatsumori kaizuka	Shichinohe	inscribed on the UNESCO World Heritage List as one of the Jōmon Prehistoric Sites in Northern Japan	Futatsumori Shell Mound	40°44′54″N 141°13′47″E	1	3206
Hamashiriya Shell Mound 浜尻屋貝塚 Hamashiriya kaizuka	Higashidōri	Muromachi period shell middens		41°24′38″N 141°27′31″E	1	00003495
Namioka Castle ruins 浪岡城跡 Namioka-jō ato	Aomori	Muromachi period castle ruins	Namioka Castle ruins	40°43′04″N 140°36′17″E	2	93
Ōmori Katsuyama Site 大森勝山遺跡 Ōmori Katsuyama iseki	Hirosaki	Jōmon period stone circle; inscribed on the UNESCO World Heritage List as one of the Jōmon Prehistoric Sites in Northern Japan	Ōmori Katsuyama Site	40°36′11″N 140°27′50″E	1	00003759
Ōdai Yamamoto I Site 大平山元遺跡 Ōdai Yamamoto iseki	Sotogahama	inscribed on the UNESCO World Heritage List as one of the Jōmon Prehistoric Sites in Northern Japan	Odai Yamamoto I Site	41°04′02″N 140°33′18″E	1	00003780
Sannobō Site 山王坊遺跡 Sannobō iseki	Goshogawara	Muromachi period temple ruins	Sannobō Site	41°03′58″N 140°22′02″E	3	00003964
Sannohe Castle Site 三戸城跡; Sannohe-jō ato	Sannohe			40°22′52″N 141°15′50″E	2	

== Prefectural Historic Sites ==
As of 11 October 2021, a further twenty Sites have been designated as being of prefectural importance.

Site	Municipality	Comments	Image	Coordinates	Type	Ref.
Seki Old Stelai 関の古碑群; Seki no ko-hi-gun	Fukaura	forty-two C14 memorial stelai		40°44′23″N 140°06′14″E		
Hachinohe Nanbu clan cemetery 八戸南部家墓所; Hachinohe nanbu-ke bosho	Hachinohe			40°30′10″N 141°29′20″E		
Karauma Stele 唐馬の碑; Karauma no hi	Sannohe			40°23′45″N 141°15′50″E		
Tenma Ichirizuka 一里塚 ichirizuka	Hachinohe	in Tenma; one mound survives		40°28′33″N 141°30′47″E		
Tairakubo Ichirizuka 一里塚 ichirizuka	Towada	in Tairakubo; both mounds survive		40°34′29″N 141°15′53″E		
Ikenotani Ichirizuka 一里塚 ichirizuka	Towada	in Ikenotai; both mounds survive		40°40′34″N 141°10′29″E		
Bonozuka Ichirizuka 一里塚 ichirizuka	Noheji	in Bonozuka; both mounds survive		40°51′33″N 141°07′36″E		
Sotsukozawa Ichirizuka 一里塚 ichirizuka	Shichinohe	in Sotsukozawa; both mounds survive		40°47′00″N 141°10′21″E		
Morinokami Ichirizuka 一里塚 ichirizuka	Shichinohe	in Morinokami; both mounds survive		40°44′45″N 141°09′24″E		
Nagakubo Ichirizuka 一里塚 ichirizuka	Hachinohe	in Nagakubo; one mound survives		40°26′14″N 141°27′48″E		
Shinden Ichirizuka 一里塚 ichirizuka	Hachinohe	in Shinden; both mounds survive		40°24′34″N 141°26′21″E		
Sunakozaki Ichirizuka 一里塚 ichirizuka	Hachinohe	in Sunakozaki; both mounds survive		40°22′36″N 141°25′01″E		
Yahatazaki Site 八幡崎遺跡; Yahatazaki iseki	Hirakawa			40°37′03″N 140°32′07″E		
Hankyōzuka 藩境塚; Hankyōzuka	Hiranai/Noheji	four mounds		40°53′14″N 141°04′57″E		
Battle of Noheji cemetery 野辺地戦争戦死者の墓所; Noheji-sensō senshisha no bosho	Noheji			40°52′16″N 141°06′34″E		
Nakano Ichirizuka 一里塚 ichirizuka	Sannohe	in Nakano; both mounds survive		40°21′01″N 141°15′43″E		
Tonai Mass Graves and Memorial Stele 斗内千人塚 墳丘 供養塔; Tonai senninzuka funkyū kuyōtō	Sannohe	from the great famine of 1783-4 (天明の大飢饉)		40°21′34″N 141°12′25″E		
Memorial Stele and Platform for the Starved 餓死萬霊等供養塔及び戒壇石; Gashi banrei-tō kuyōtō oyobi kaidanseki	Hachinohe	from the 1780s famine; in Teranoue		40°29′55″N 141°31′35″E		
Nakasato Castle ruins 中里城遺跡; Nakasato-jō iseki	Nakadomari			40°58′13″N 140°26′30″E		
Tairadate Battery ruins 平舘台場跡; Tairadate daiba ato	Sotogahama			41°10′28″N 140°38′34″E		

== Municipal Historic Sites ==
As of 1 May 2021, a further ninety-two Sites have been designated as being of municipal importance.

== See also ==
- Cultural Properties of Japan
- Mutsu Province
- List of Places of Scenic Beauty of Japan (Aomori)
- List of Cultural Properties of Japan - paintings (Aomori)
- Aomori Prefectural Museum
