= Namioka Castle =

Muromachi period japanese castle

- 浪岡城
- Aomori, Aomori Prefecture, Japan
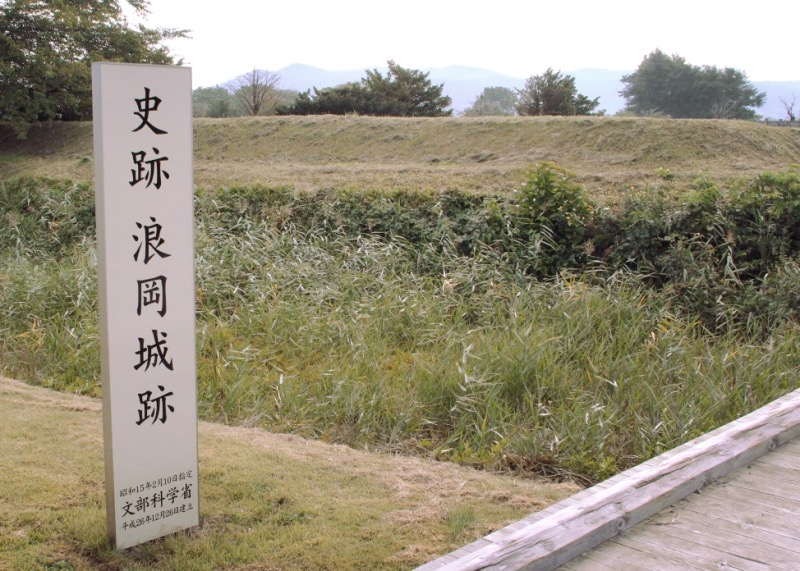
- Site of Namioka Castle

Site information
- Type: hirayama-style Japanese castle
- Open to the public: yes (museum on site)
- Condition: ruins

Location
- Location within Aomori Prefecture Location within Japan
- Coordinates: 40°43′04″N 140°36′17″E

Site history
- Built: 1373
- Built by: Kitabatake clan
- In use: Nanboku-cho period
- Demolished: 1578

Namioka Castle (浪岡城, Namioka jō) was a Muromachi period Japanese castle located in what is now the city of Aomori, Aomori Prefecture, in the Tōhoku region of far northern Japan. The ruins were designated a National Historic Site in 1940 by the Japanese government.

== Situation ==
Namioka Castle is located on a fluvial terrace of the Namioka River, in former Namioka town, south of the center of Aomori city. The location is roughly long and narrow diamond which commands a central location to cover the entry to the Tsugaru Plain from the east.

The castle consisted of eight motte-and-bailey enclosures, approximately 800 meters long by 800 meters wide. The Kitayakata (North Residence) served as the inner bailey, and did not contain a tenshu. The outer enclosures included the Nishiyakata (West Residence), Higashiyakata (East Residence), Uchiyakata (Inner Residence), Shinyakata (New Residence), etc.

As was typical for the time, each enclosure had its own fortifications, which consisted primarily of wooden palisades and earthen ramparts, guarded by a double moat directly connected to the Namioka River. The moats were 20 meters wide by 5 meter deep. The jōkamachi contained streets built in a grid pattern similar to that of Kyoto

== History ==
Namioka Castle was constructed around 1373, during the early Nanboku-chō period, by the Namioka-Kitabatake clan. During the struggles between Emperor Go-Daigo and Ashikaga Takauji, Kitabatake Akiie, who had been sent to rule northern Japan from Taga Castle was appointed Chinjufu-shōgun. In December 1335, Kitabatake Akiie and his father Kitabatake Chikafusa drove Ashikaga Takauji from Kyoto to Kyushu. However, Takauji was able to raise a new army the following year, and after defeating Emperor Go-Daigo at the Battle of Minatogawa, was able to drive him into exile in Yoshino. Kitabatake Akiie was subsequently defeated by the forces of Kō no Moronao at the Battle of Ishizu in 1338. His younger brother, Kitabatake Akinobu was also unable to hold Taga Castle and other strongholds against the victorious Ashikaga forces and fled to the far north of Honshū, seeking the protection of the Nanbu clan based at Sannohe Castle and the Andō clan who controlled Tosaminato on the Sea of Japan and changed his family name to “Namioka”.

In 1562, during the Sengoku period, there was an internal conflict within the Namioka clan, in which Namioka Tomokazu (1532-1562) was killed. Although the revolt was suppressed, the weakened Namioka clan was unable to resist an attack in 1578 by Oura Tamenobu, who had seized the Tsugaru region and declared independence from the Nanbu. The castle was abandoned soon thereafter.

== Current situation ==
In 1940 the site of Namioka Castle was proclaimed a National Historic Site with a designated area of approximately 136,300 square meters (1.2 km east–west, 600 m north–south). The site of the castle remains in ruins, with only about 30 percent excavated; however, public access is permitted and there is a museum at the site. Recovered artifacts number more than 50,000 items such as tableware, cooking utensils, weapons, farming tools, and religious implements. The ruins are approximately a 20 minute walk from the JR East Namioka Station.

The castle was listed as one of the Continued Top 100 Japanese Castles in 2017.

== See also ==
- List of Historic Sites of Japan (Aomori)
