= Hachinohe City Museum =

Museum in Hachinohe, Aomori, Japan

- 八戸市博物館
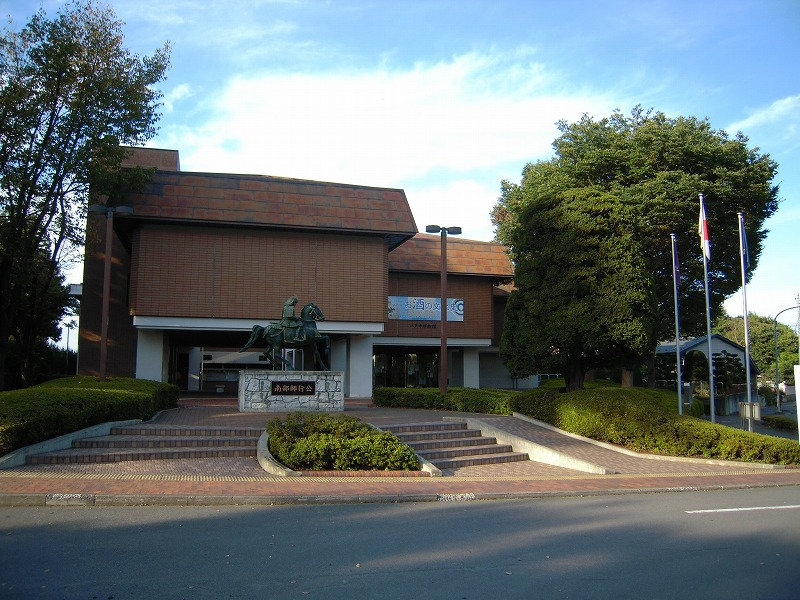

General information
- Location: 35-1 Higashigamae, Nejō, Hachinohe, Aomori Prefecture, Japan
- Coordinates: 40°30′30″N 141°27′52″E
- Opened: 15 July 1983

Website
- Official website (ja)

Hachinohe City Museum (八戸市博物館, Hachinohe-shi Hakubutsukan) opened in Hachinohe, Aomori Prefecture, Japan in 1983. The displays document the archaeology, history, and folkways of the area, the collection including an assemblage of artefacts excavated from the Tangotai Kofun Cluster that has been designated an Important Cultural Property.

== See also ==
- Korekawa Archaeological Institution (Korekawa Jōmon Kan)
- Chōshichiyachi Shell Mound
- Hachinohe Castle
