= Ne Castle =

- 根城
- Hachinohe, Aomori Prefecture, Japan
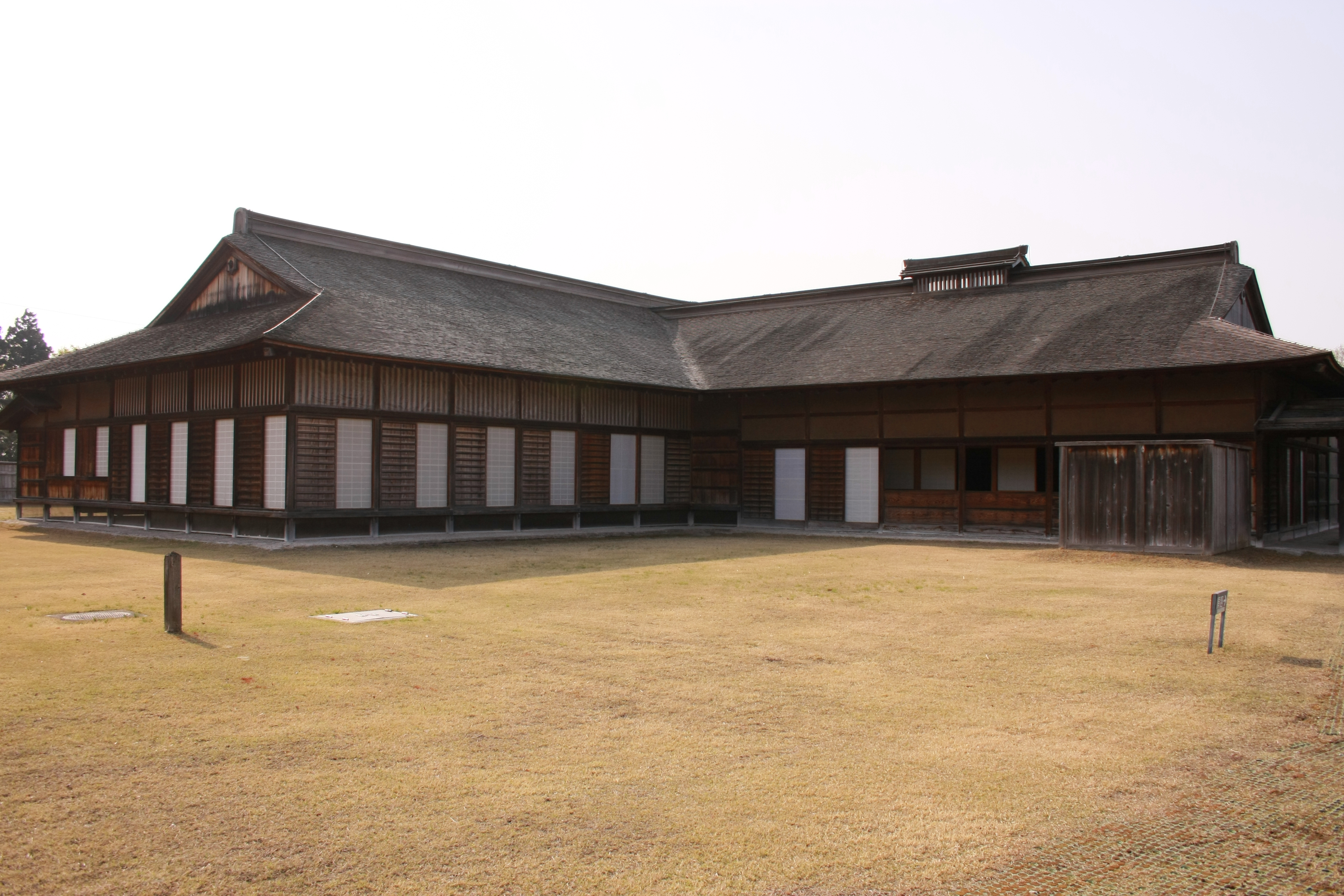
- Reconstructed palace structure of Ne Castle

Site information
- Type: hirayama-style Japanese castle
- Open to the public: yes
- Condition: Reconstructed

Location
- Ne Castle
- Location within Aomori Prefecture Location within Japan
- Coordinates: 40°30′22.83″N 141°27′34.6″E

Site history
- Built: 1334
- Built by: Nanbu clan
- In use: Nanboku-Edo period
- Demolished: 1627

Ne Castle (根城, Ne jō) is a Muromachi period Motte-and-bailey-style Japanese castle located in what is now the city of Hachinohe, Aomori Prefecture, in the Tōhoku region of far northern Japan. It has been protected by the central government as a National Historic Site since 1941. It was extensively reconstructed in 1994.

== Situation ==
Ne Castle consists of five motte-and-bailey enclosures on a roughly L-shaped river terrace on the south bank of the Mabechi River, approximately 500 meters long by 300 meters wide. As was typical for the time, the fortifications consisted primarily of wooden palisades and earthen ramparts, guarded by 20-meter wide dry moats. The area was divided into several enclosures, or baileys, with varying elevations. There was no donjon in the central bailey, which was occupied by a large building, possibly in the Shōin style, based on evidence of foundation posts, as the residence of the ruling Nanbu clan. Other enclosures held the residences of important retainers, along with barracks, workshops and storerooms. Some of the buildings were constructed as pit dwellings indicating the survival of this ancient building style into the Muromachi period. One of the enclosures contained a Buddhist temple, Tōzen-ji, which served as the Nanbu clan temple.

== History ==
Ne Castle was constructed in 1334, during the early Nanboku-chō period, by Nanbu Moroyuki, a retainer of Kitabatake Akiie, the kokushi of Mutsu Province and was intended to be a center for the imperial government administration in the area. Nanbu Motoyuki was under allegiance to the Southern Court; however, at the same time, another branch of the same Nanbu family ruled the nearby Sannohe and Morioka areas under allegiance to the rival Northern Court. The two branches of the clan made peace with each other in 1393.

In 1590, at the end of the Sengoku period, Nanbu Nobunao of the Sannohe-Nanbu supported Toyotomi Hideyoshi at the Siege of Odawara and was awarded formal rule of all seven districts of northern Mutsu Province, which were already under the control of the Nanbu clan. The 18th generation castellan of Ne Castle, Nanbu (Hachinohe) Masayuki, became his retainer. The fortifications at Ne Castle were destroyed in 1592 by order of Toyotomi Hideyoshi, and the clan headquarters was relocated to Sannohe Castle, although some local administrative functions remained at the site.

In 1627, the 22nd generation castellan, Nanbu Naohide was relocated to Tōno in what is now Iwate Prefecture and Ne Castle was completely abandoned. The nearby castle town of Hachinohe remained a local administrative center under another branch of the Nanbu clan from Sannohe; and a new castle (Hachinohe Castle) was built further to the east.

On December 13, 1941, the site of Ne Castle was proclaimed a National Historic Site. From 1983 to 1994, extensive archaeological investigations uncovered the foundations of the original structures and many artifacts from the Namboku-chō period.

Ne Castle was listed as one of Japan's Top 100 Castles by the Japan Castle Foundation in 2006.

== Current situation ==
The castle was largely reconstructed in 1994, with some emphasis on the inner citadel On the current site there are two gates, one for the lord and guests, the other a simpler gate for servants and workers. There are many reconstructed parts of the castle on site. Technically, Ne Castle was constructed before the main era of Japanese castle development, so while there are still gates, baileys, and yagura watchtowers, there is no main keep. There is little stonework, and the walls are just wooden posts palisades on the outside, and simple slat wood walls in the central compound.

== See also ==
- List of Historic Sites of Japan (Aomori)

== Gallery ==
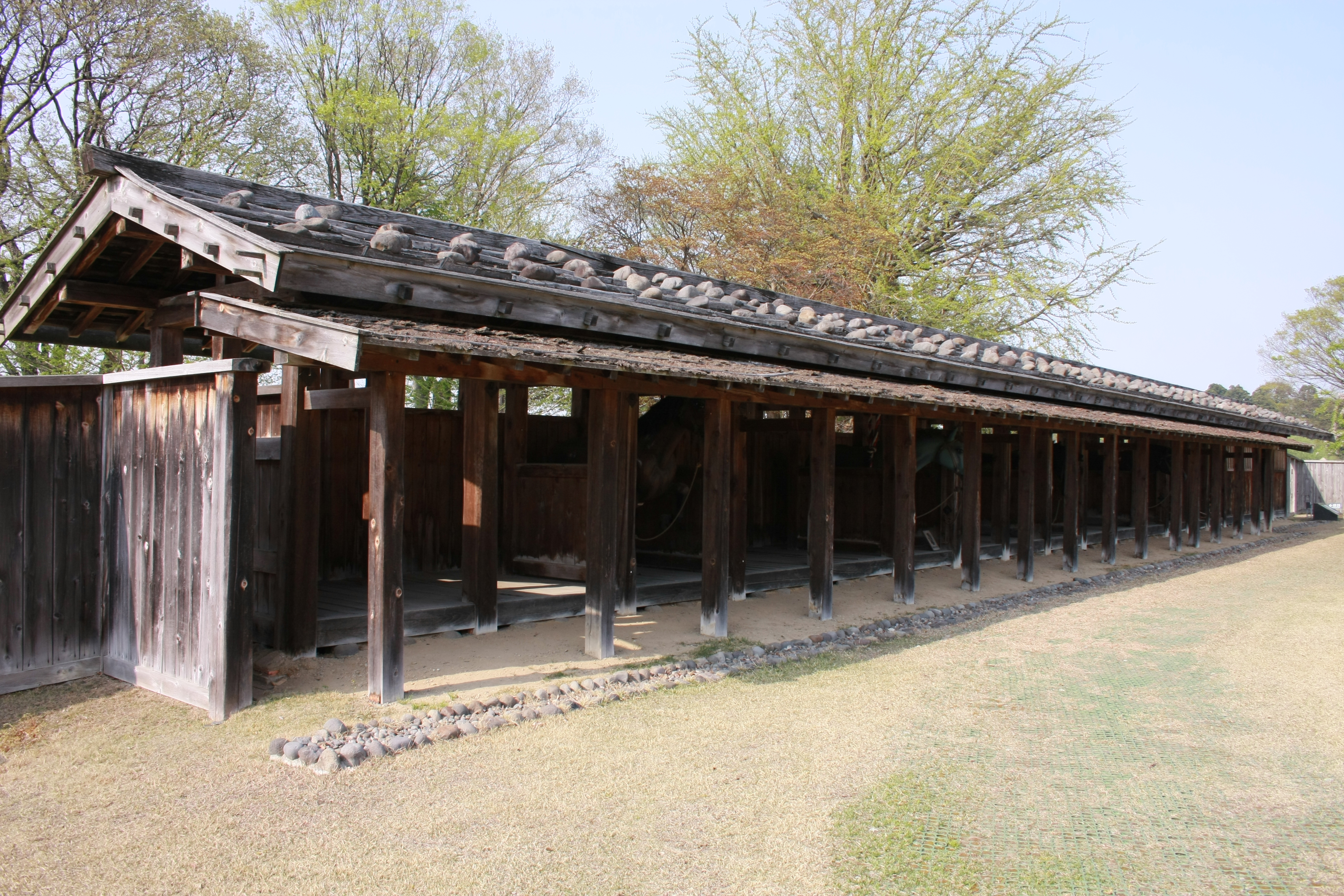
Reconstructed stables

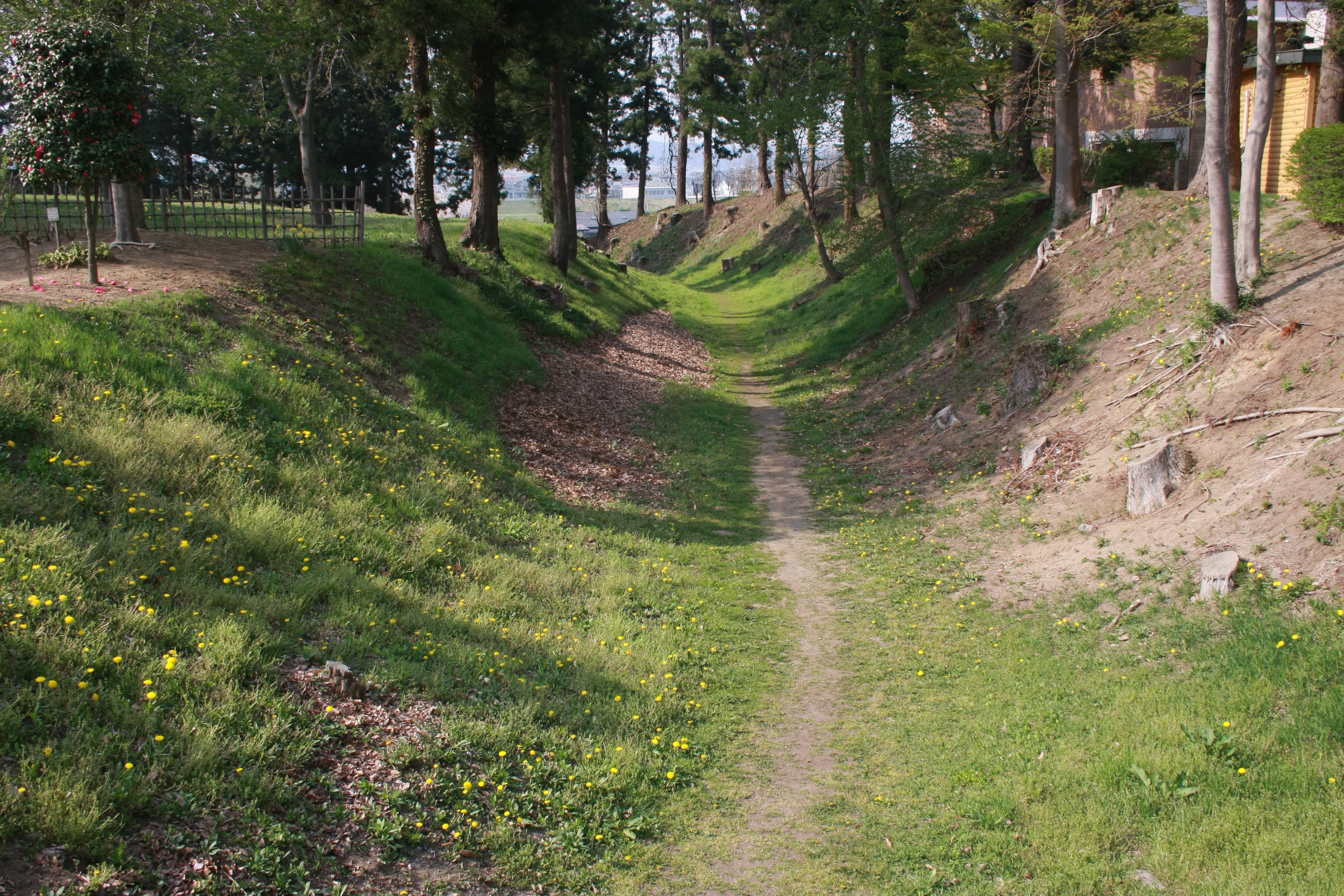
Dry moat

== Literature ==
- De Lange, William (2021). An Encyclopedia of Japanese Castles. Groningen: Toyo Press. pp. 600 pages. ISBN 978-9492722300.
- Schmorleitz, Morton S. (1974). Castles in Japan. Tokyo: Charles E. Tuttle Co. pp. 144–145. ISBN 0-8048-1102-4.
- Motoo, Hinago (1986). Japanese Castles. Tokyo: Kodansha. p. 200 pages. ISBN 0-87011-766-1.
- Mitchelhill, Jennifer (2004). Castles of the Samurai: Power and Beauty. Tokyo: Kodansha. p. 112 pages. ISBN 4-7700-2954-3.
- Turnbull, Stephen (2003). Japanese Castles 1540-1640. Osprey Publishing. p. 64 pages. ISBN 1-84176-429-9.
