= Takayashikidate Site =

Archeological site in Aomori, Tohuku, Japan

- 高屋敷館遺跡 (Japanese)
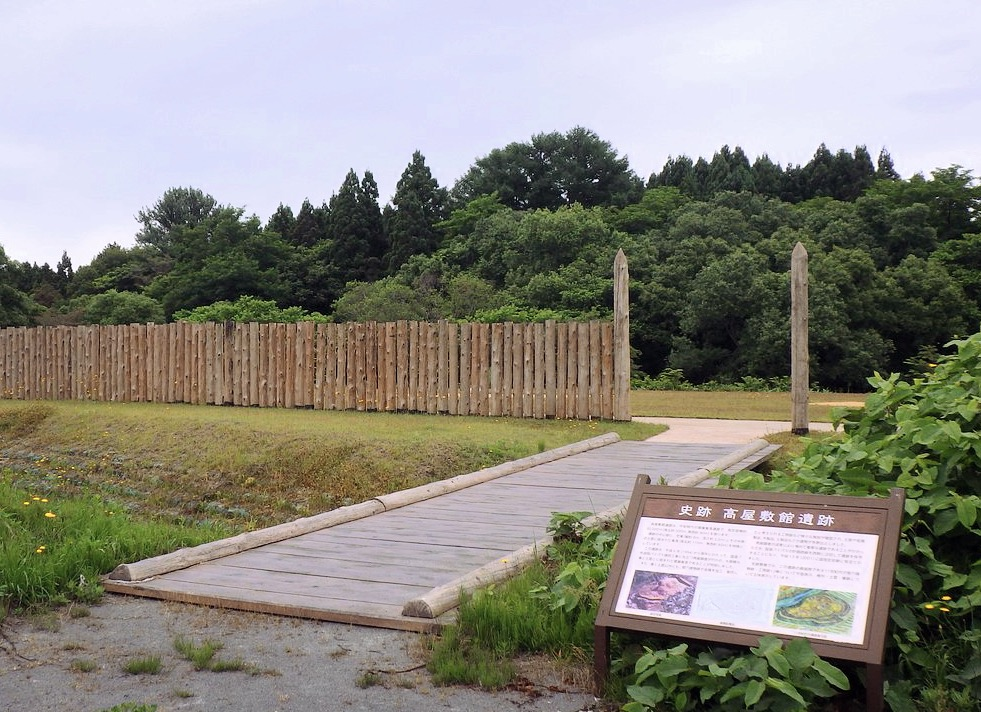
- Takayashikidate Site

- Location within Aomori Prefecture Location within Japan
- Interactive map of Takayashikidate Site
- 40°44′13″N 140°35′04″E
- Type: settlement
- Periods: Heian period
- Location: Aomori, Aomori, Japan
- Region: Tōhoku region

History
- Built: 900 - 1100 AD

Site notes
- Excavation dates: 2004-2005
- Discovered: 1994
- Public access: Yes (no public facilities)

The Takayashikidate ruins (高屋敷館遺跡, Takayashikidate iseki) is an archaeological site containing the ruins of a fortified settlement dating to the Heian period in what is now the Namioka neighborhood of the city of Aomori, Aomori Prefecture, in the Tōhoku region of northern Japan. The ruins were designated a National Historic Site in 2012 by the Japanese government.

== Overview ==
During the middle Heian period, the very far northern portion of Mutsu province was only tenuously within the control of the central government and was largely in the hands of Emishi tribes. In the latter half of the 11th century, the region experienced several major conflicts, including the Zenkunen War and Gosannen War.

The Takayashikidate site was a moated settlement with a protected area of approximately 30,000 square meters (500 meters north-south by 90 meters east-west), in the center of which are the ruins of a fortified village inhabited from the 10th century through the 12th century AD, or the middle to end of the Heian period. The moat ranged from six to eight meters in width and up to four meters deep, and had an earthen rampart and wooden palisade. The settlement itself measured approximately 110 meters north-south by 80 meters east-west and contained at least 86 buildings, some of which were pit dwellings and some of which were stilt-pillar buildings connected by passageways. There is a gap in the earthworks on the west side of the moat, which had a gate with many pillars, and a wooden bridge was built in the southwest, which is thought to have provided an entrance and exit. The location of the site is on a fluvial terrace on the west bank of the Daishaka River at an altitude of 35–45 meters.

The site was discovered in 1994, during construction of the Namioka Bypass on Japan National Route 7. Partial excavation work was undertaken from 2004 to 2005 by the Aomori Board of Education, and approximately half of the settlement area was excavated. As a result of the excavation, the route of the bypass was shifted to the west to preserve the site.

A large number of artifacts were discovered, including fragments of cloth, housing materials, Sue pottery, lacquerware, agriculture tools, smithing tools and accessories and weapons. Due to the large amount of iron slag discovered, it appears that the settlement was a center for blacksmithing or metal working.

The settlement was abandoned for unknown reasons, and the moat became filled in. The area was subsequently used as an orchard. The site is approximately five minutes by car from the JR East Namioka Station on the Ōu Main Line.

== See also ==
- List of Historic Sites of Japan (Aomori)
