= Shōjujidate Castle =

Shōjojidate Castle 聖寿寺館
- Nanbu, Aomori Prefecture, Japan
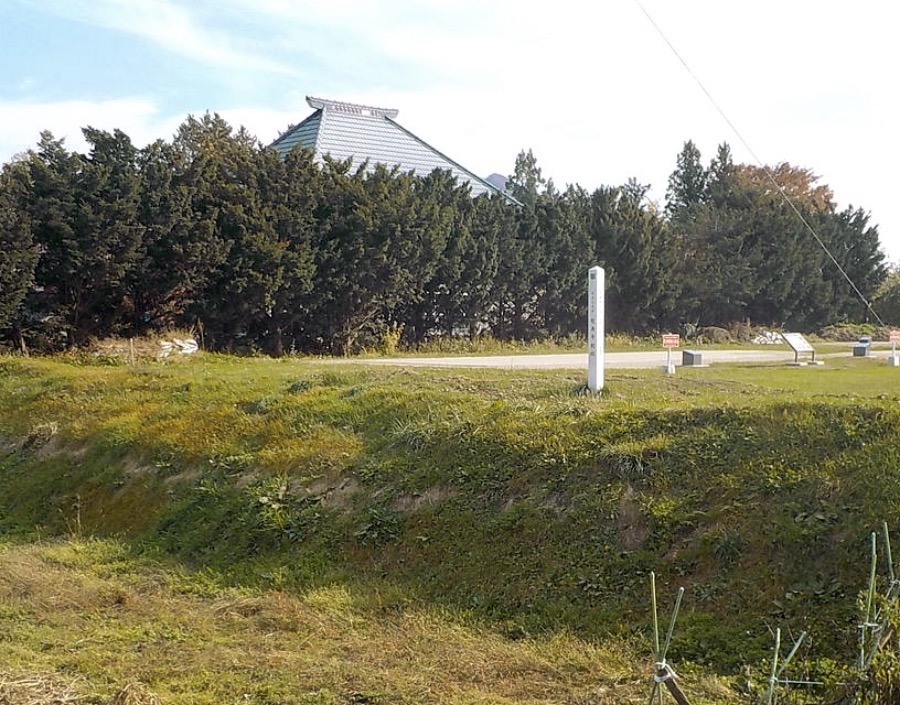
- Shōjojidate ruins

Site information
- Type: hirayama-style Japanese castle
- Open to the public: no
- Condition: ruins

Location
- Shōjujidate Castle
- Location within Aomori Prefecture Location within Japan
- Coordinates: 40°24′43″N 141°15′56″E

Site history
- Built: Kamakura period
- Built by: Nanbu Nobunaga
- In use: Muromachi to Sengoku periods
- Demolished: 1539

Shōjojidate Castle (聖寿寺館, Shōjojidate) was a Muromachi period Japanese castle located in what is now the town of Nanbu, in Sannohe District of Aomori Prefecture, in the Tōhoku region of far northern Japan. It was also known as the Moto-Sannohe Castle (本三戸城, Moto-Sannohe jō) (i.e. former Sannohe Castle). It was located at a strategic junction of the Ōshū Kaidō with the Kakuno Kaidō and the Mabechi River. The site of the castle, as well as the Buddhist temple of Sankō-ji, and the Moto-Sannohe Hachiman-gu Shinto Shrine collectively received protection as a National Historic Site on 30 September 2004. Portions of the site are now on private lands occupied by local farm houses and fruit orchards.

== Shōjojidate ruins ==
The Nanbu clan claimed descent from the Seiwa Genji of Kai Province. Minamoto no Yoshimitsu was awarded Kai Province following the Gosannen War, and his great-grandson Nobuyoshi took the surname Takeda. Another great-grandson, Mitsuyuki, took the name "Nanbu", after the location of his estates in Kai Province, which are now part of the town of Nanbu, Yamanashi. Nanbu Mitsuyuki joined Minamoto no Yoritomo at the Battle of Ishibashiyama and served in various mid-level positions within the Kamakura shogunate and is mentioned several times in the Azuma Kagami. He accompanied Yoritomo in the conquest of the Hiraizumi Fujiwara in 1189, and was awarded with vast estates in Nukanobu District the extreme northeast of Honshū, building Shōjujidate Castle.

The fortification was more of a fortified house than a true castle, and is a built on a roughly trapezoidal 20 meter hilltop, partially protected to the north by a 20 meter wide dry moat, and by steep cliffs on other sides. It was also located adjacent to the Nanbu clan temple of Shōjo-ji, from which it takes its name. The castle served as the residence of the Sannohe Nanbu clan for over 200 years, until the time of the 24th hereditary chieftain, Nanbu Harumasa, when it was burned down in a revolt by one of his retainers in June 1539. Shōjujidate Castle is located only 700 meters west of Hiragasaki Castle and four kilometers north of Sannohe Castle.

== Sanko-ji ==
The temple of Sanko-ji is a Buddhist temple belonging to the Rinzai school of Japanese Zen and is located just to the north of the ruins of Shōjo-ji. It is one of what were once several temples patronized by the Nanbu clan in the area, but the other temples relocated to Morioka during the Edo period when the Nanbu clan made Morioka Castle their seat. Sanko-ji remained as it contained the graves of the 26th chieftain, Nanbu Nobunao and his wife (Nanbu Town Historic Site), and the mortuary chapel of the 27th chieftain, Nanbu Toshinao (Aomori Prefectural Historic Site), and the mortuary chapel of Toshinao's son, Nanbu Toshiyasu (Important Cultural Property). In addition, the temple has a small tumulus which is claimed to be the grave of the 2nd chieftain of the Nanbu clan, Nanbu Sanemitsu.

== Moto-Sannohe Hachiman-gu ==
This Hachiman shrine is built on a plateau along the Mabuchi River, south of the main site of the Shōju-ji temple. It is believed to have been the site of a fortification erected by Nambu Nobunao in 1578; however, the shrine itself is said to have been transferred from Kai Province when the Nanbu clan relocated to Nukanobu District. The grave of the 23rd chieftain of the clan, Nanbu Yasunobu (Aomori Prefectural ICP) remains at this shrine; however, other graves which once existed at this location have disappeared due to the erosion by the Mabuchi River.

== See also ==
- List of Historic Sites of Japan (Aomori)
