= Tareyanagi Site =

Archaeological site in Inakadate, Japan

- 垂柳遺跡 (Japanese)
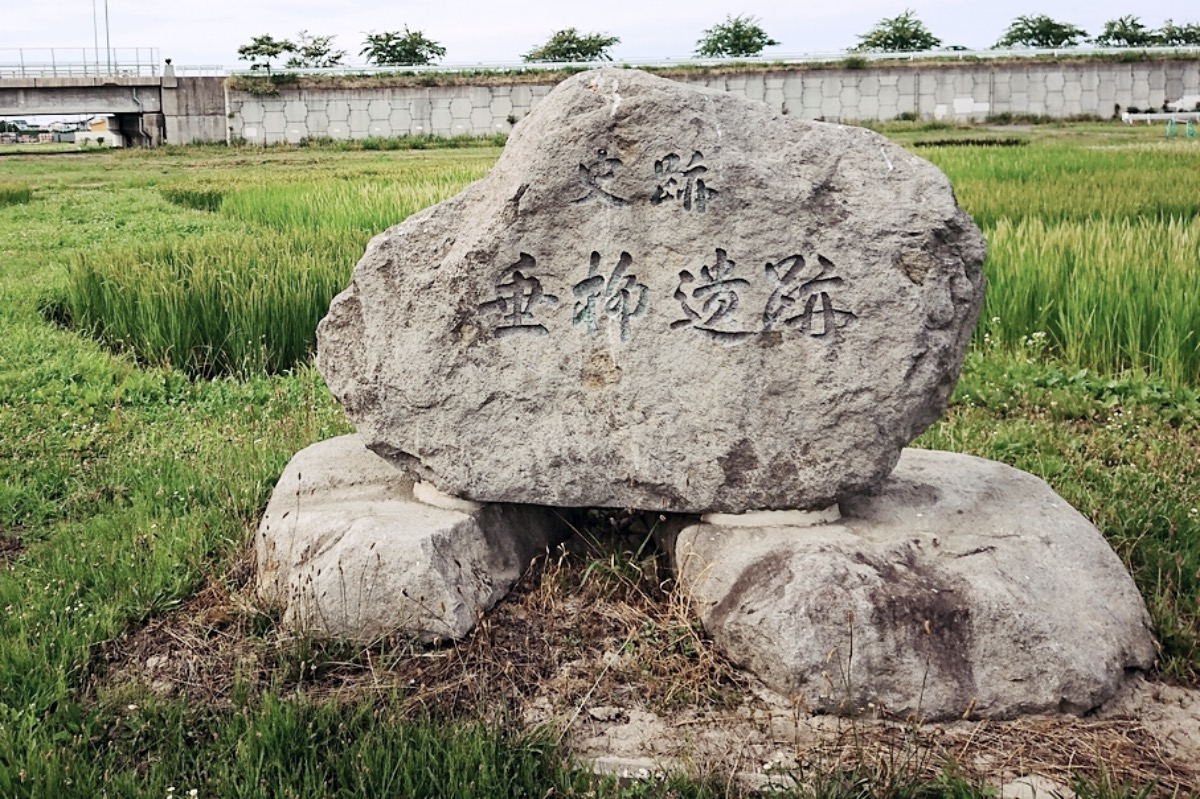
- Tareyanagi Site

- Tareyanagi Site Tareyanagi Site (Japan)
- Interactive map of Tareyanagi Site
- 40°37′55.8″N 140°33′56.7″E
- Type: settlement remains
- Periods: Yayoi period
- Location: Inakadate, Aomori, Japan
- Region: Tōhoku region

History
- Built: c. 100 BC

Site notes
- Excavation dates: 1982-1983
- Discovered: 1981
- Public access: Yes (on site museum)

The Tareyanagi Site (垂柳遺跡, Tareyanagi iseki) is an archaeological site in the Tareyanagi and Takahi neighborhoods of the village of Inakadate, Aomori Prefecture, in the Tōhoku region of northern Japan. It contains the remains of rice paddy field from the middle of the Yayoi period (approx. 300 BC to 300 AD). The remains were designated a National Historic Site in 2000 by the Japanese government.

== Overview ==
The origins of wet rice cultivation in Japan are subject to debate; however, the general consensus is that it was introduced from the Yangtze River estuary in southern China via the Korean Peninsula by the Yayoi people, who were distinctively different from the earlier Jōmon people who had inhabited the Japanese archipelago. The agricultural Yayoi people gradually displaced the hunter-gather Jōmon people; however as the cold climate of northern Tōhoku was inclement to rice cultivation, the Jōmon people survived in the form of the Emishi tribes. The discovery of the remains of ten rice paddies on alluvial land approximately 30 meters above sea level on the left bank of the Asaseishi River during construction work for a bypass on Japan National Route 102 in 1981 upset prevalent theories when radiocarbon dating of Yayoi pottery and rice husk fragments also found at the site indicated that the rice paddies had been created in the mid-Yayoi period, or around 100 BC. This was far earlier than expected for a site this far north on the island of Honshu. The pottery closely resembled Zoku-Jōmon period pottery normally found in Hokkaido, and was named "Inakadate-style" pottery. Other items excavated at this site include a single-edged stone axe, stone arrowhead and carbonized rice grains.

Further excavations from 1982 to1983 uncovered a total of 656 paddies of various sizes, with the largest at 22 square meters, and the smallest at 4 square meters. The footprints of people were found in 112 of the paddies. The area was preserved by being covered with a layer of ash from an eruption of the Hakkōda Mountains.

A museum exists on site to explain the findings, and is approximately ten minutes on foot from Inakadate Station on the Kōnan Railway Kōnan Line.

== Gallery ==
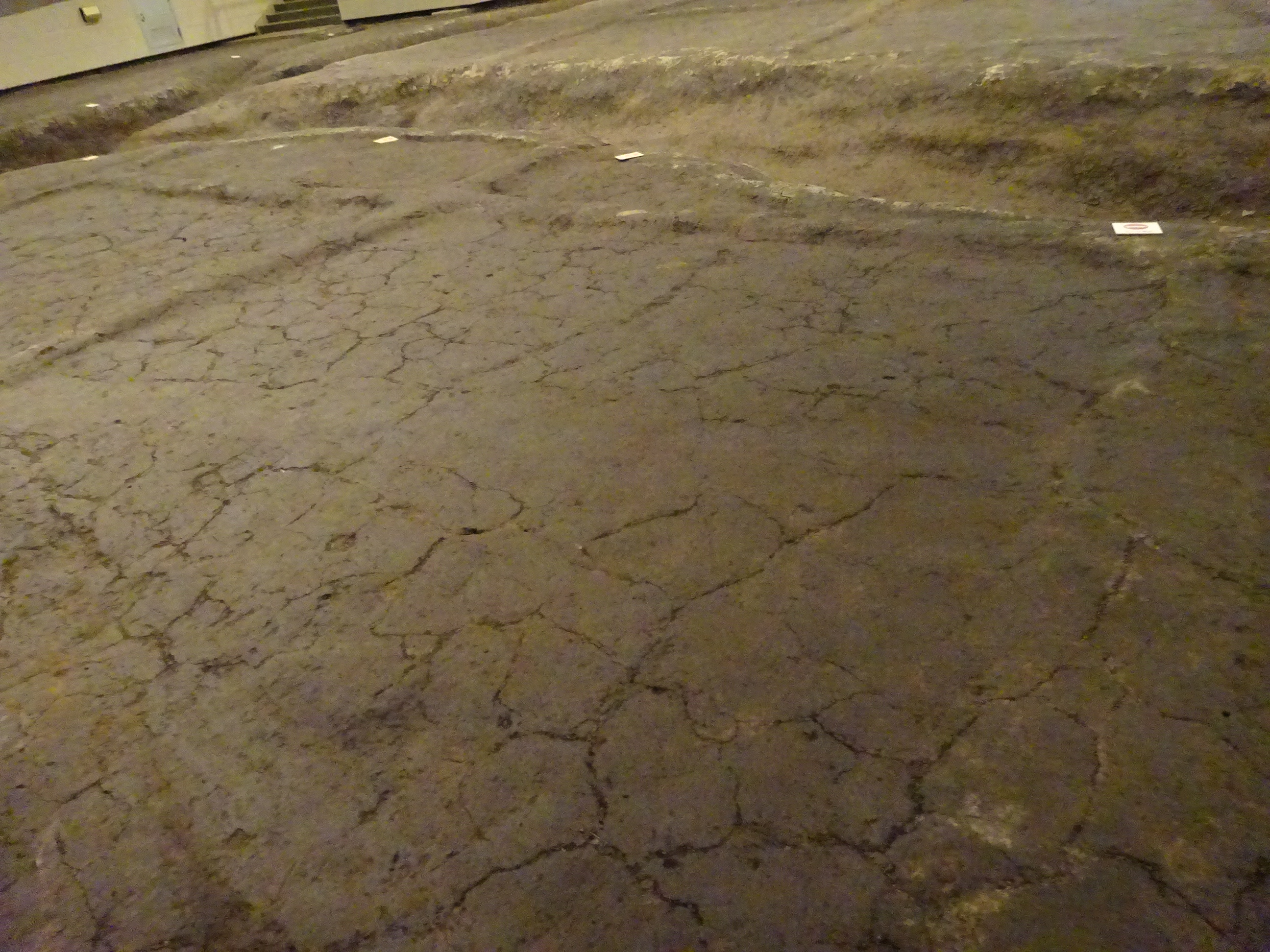
Excavated rice paddies

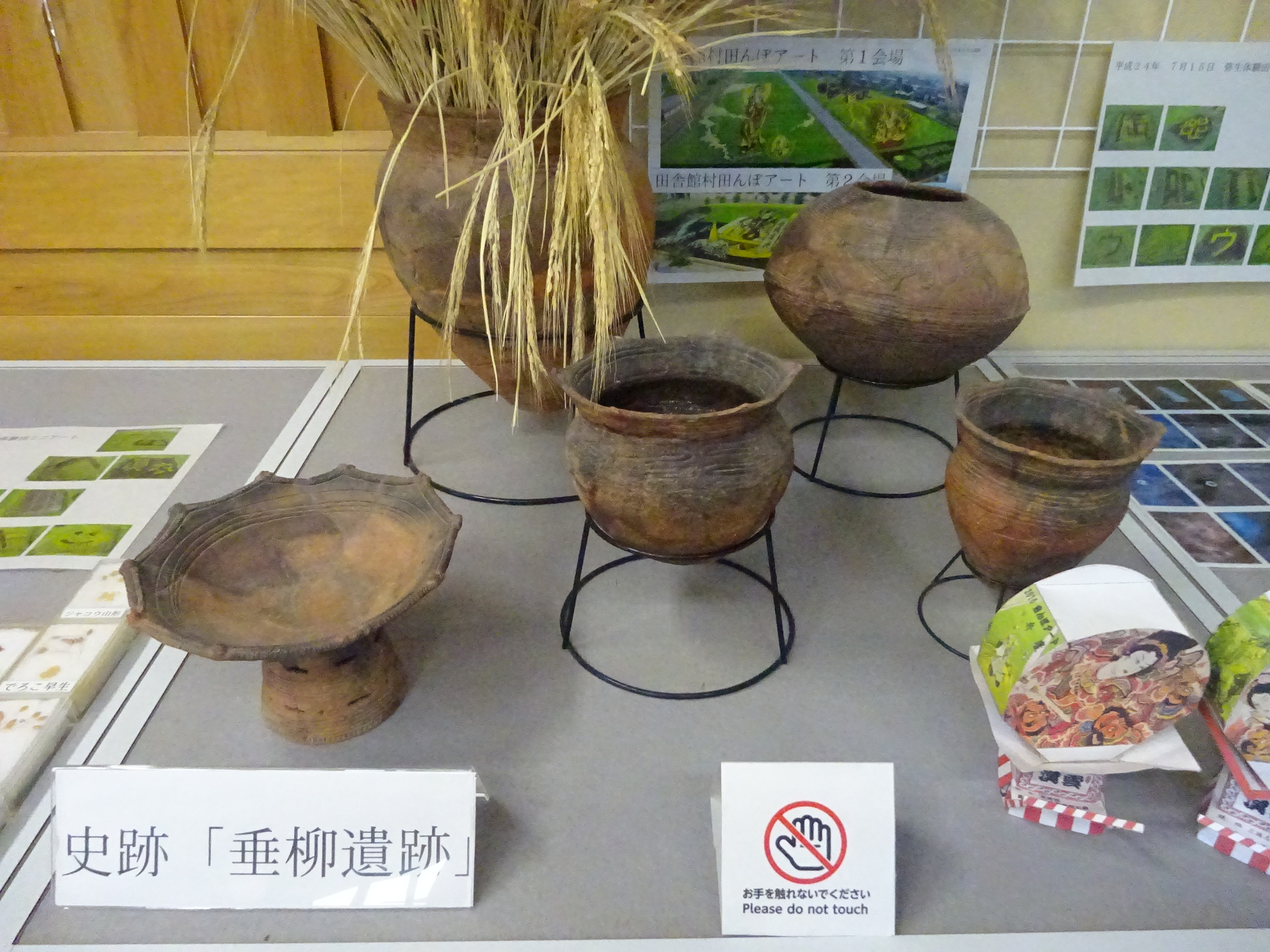
Excavated ceramics

== See also ==
- List of Historic Sites of Japan (Aomori)
