= Nakuidake Prefectural Natural Park =

Natural park of Aomori prefecture, Japan

- 名久井岳県立自然公園
- Location within Aomori Prefecture Location within Japan
- Location: Aomori Prefecture, Japan
- Nearest city: Sannohe/Nanbu
- Coordinates: 40°23′16″N 141°18′30″E
- Area: 10.76 km^{2} (4.15 sq mi)
- Established: 25 October 1956
- Governing body: Aomori Prefecture

Nakuidake Prefectural Natural Park (名久井岳県立自然公園, Nakuidake kenritsu shizen-kōen) is a Prefectural Natural Park in southeast Aomori Prefecture, Japan. Established in 1956, the park spans 10.76 square kilometres (4.15 sq mi) on the borders of the municipalities of Sannohe and Nanbu, and encompasses the 615.4 metres (2,019 ft) Mount Nakuidake.

== See also ==
- National Parks of Japan
