= Tosaminato =

- 十三湊 (Japanese)
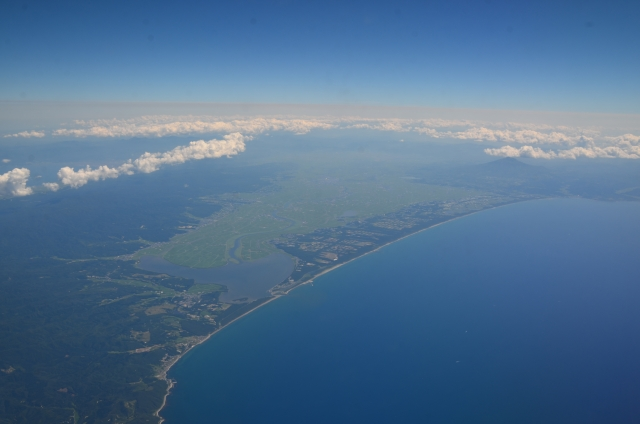

- Tosaminato ruins Tosaminato (Japan)
- 41°01′43″N 140°19′46″E
- Type: settlement
- Periods: Muromachi period
- Location: Goshogawara, Aomori, Japan
- Region: Tōhoku region

Site notes
- Elevation: 0 m (0 ft)
- Excavation dates: 1993-1996
- Public access: Yes (no public facilities)

Tosaminato (十三湊) was a port settlement which existed from the Heian to the Muromachi period located in what is now part of the city of Goshogawara, Aomori in the Tōhoku region of Japan. Its ruins are now is an archaeological site which was designated a National Historic Site of Japan in 2005.

A theory regarding its etymology is that it is a corruption of the Ainu word to sam (lakeside).

== Overview ==
Tosaminato was located on the narrow strip of land which separate Lake Jūsan from the Sea of Japan on the west coast of Aomori Prefecture. The area forms a natural harbor, as Lake Jūsan was an inlet of the sea during that period, and not a lake. It was developed as a center for trade with the Ainu people and the Asian mainland by the Hiraizumi-based Northern Fujiwara during the Heian period, although it may have been used by the Emishi people much earlier. From 1229 it came under the control of the Andō clan, who built a castle for protection, and who came to dominate trade with the northern island of Ezo in the Kamakura period under the title of the Presiding Governor of Ezo. By the early Muromachi period, it was a major port on the coastal trade routes along the Sea of Japan, and was also actively involved in overseas trade directly with the Korean Peninsula. However, by the mid-Muromachi period, the Andō clan was forced to relocate from the area to Hokkaido due to increasing aggressive attacks by the Nanbu clan in 1432, and Tosaminato went into rapid decline. The Nanbu developed Noheji on Mutsu Bay as their main port for contact with Ezo, as it was more convenient to their seat at Sannohe Castle and later to Morioka, and Tosaminato eventually silted up, becoming largely unusable.

During the Edo Period, then area came under the control of the Tsugaru clan, who had a strong enmity against the Nanbu. The Tsugaru attempted to redevelop Tosaminato as a port on the kitamaebune trade routes to take their rice and timber to markets in Osaka and to re-establish contacts with Ezo, but it never regained its former prosperity

The archaeological site is roughly triangular in shape and covers around 55 hectares, approximately 2 km north–south and up to 500 m east–west. It was excavated between 1993 and 1995 by a team from the National Museum of Japanese History, and in 1995-1996 by teams from the Aomori Prefecture Education Office and Toyama University. Excavation revealed that the settlement was defended by an outer wall of packed earth, while an interior wall separated the city into two parts. The north sector included the Andō residence, surrounded by those of their vassals, a temple, and the port itself. The southern sector included other residences, commercial spaces, and temples. Chinese ceramics and Kyoto-style tiles, which are rare in the Tōhoku region, have also been found. Excavated artifacts indicated that it reached its apogee around the second half fourteenth to early fifteenth century.

== See also ==
- List of Historic Sites of Japan (Aomori)
