= Tangotai Kofun =

Tangotai Kofun group
- 丹後平古墳群 (Japanese)
- Location within Aomori Prefecture Location within Japan
- Interactive map of Tangotai Kofun group
- 40°28′52″N 141°28′1.2″E
- Type: kofun group
- Location: Hachinohe, Aomori, Japan
- Region: Tōhoku region

History
- Built: 7th to 9th century AD

Site notes
- Elevation: 90 m (300 ft)
- Area: 7,000 hectares (17,000 acres)
- Excavation dates: 1989-1990
- Discovered: 1987
- Public access: Yes

The Tangotai Kofun Cluster (丹後平古墳群, Tangotai Kofun-gun) is an archaeological site with a group of circular kofun burial mounds located southwest of the city of Hachinohe in Aomori Prefecture in the northern Tōhoku region of northern Japan. In 1999, approximately 7000 hectares of the site received protection as a National Historic Site since 1999.

== Overview ==
The Tangotai site is located on a sloping hill between the Mabechi and Dobashi Rivers, near the Pacific Ocean seacoast. The surrounding area has a high concentration of ruins from the Jōmon through Kofun periods, including the remnants of settlements, graveyards and smaller clusters of kofun as well as a ceremonial burial site for horses.

An estimated 100 tombs were uncovered at the Tangotai site during construction of the “Hachinohe New Town” urban development project in 1987. All were circular enpun (円墳)-style mound between four and nine meters in diameter, with a central pit containing a wooden coffin, but many of them have a passage-like overhang that is thought to be derived from the entourage of the horizontal hole type stone chamber in front of the pit that holds the casket. In some cases, the casket was resting on a bed of gravel, and in others, it was on charcoal.

The tombs are estimated to date from the late 7th century to the mid-9th century, based on the numerous grave goods were uncovered from the 29 tombs which were fully excavated in 1987–1988, 1994 to 1998, and 2000. These included shards of Haji and Sue pottery, fragments of swords and metal agricultural implements, and thousands of spherical, magatama and tubular beads. Of particular interest was a decorated sword hilt discovered in Tomb 15, with a design similar to those made in Baekje on the Korean Peninsula in the late 6th century. Within Tomb 25 a Wadōkaichin coin minted in 708 AD was discovered. In 2018, 195 items were collectively designated a National Important Cultural Property The relics are on display at the Hachinohe City Museum.

The Tagotai Kofun cluster dates from a time when the area was still populated by the Emishi people and was beyond the control of the central imperial government, yet it indicates the penetration and survival of late Kofun period culture beyond the political bounds of the central government, and hints at possible direct contact between the northern Tōhoku region of Japan and the Korean peninsula in prehistoric times.

The site was backfilled after excavation, and is located approximately 10 minutes by car from Hachinohe Station.

== See also ==
- List of Historic Sites of Japan (Aomori)
