= Inakadate, Aomori =

Inakadate 田舎館村
- Village
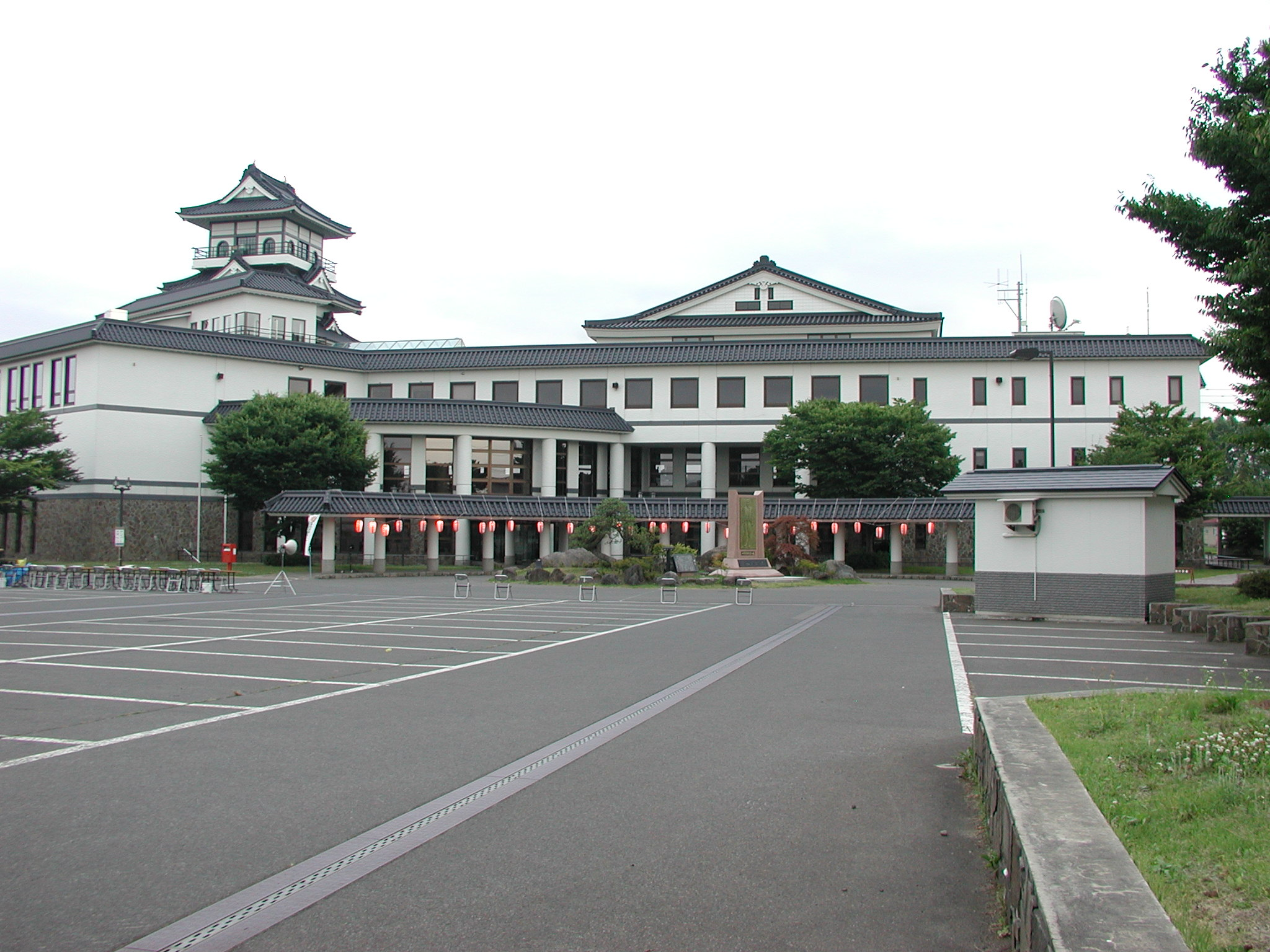
- Inakadate Village Hall

- Flag Seal
- Interactive map of Inakadate
- Coordinates: 40°37′52.1″N 140°33′08″E
- Country: Japan
- Region: Tōhoku
- Prefecture: Aomori
- District: Minamitsugaru

Area
  - Total: 22.35 km^{2} (8.63 sq mi)

Population (January 31, 2023)
  - Total: 7,420
  - Density: 332/km^{2} (860/sq mi)
- Time zone: UTC+9 (Japan Standard Time)
- Phone number: 0172-58-2111
- Address: 1 Nakatsuji, Inakadate-mura, Minamitsugaru-gun, Aomori-ken 038-1113
- Website: Official website

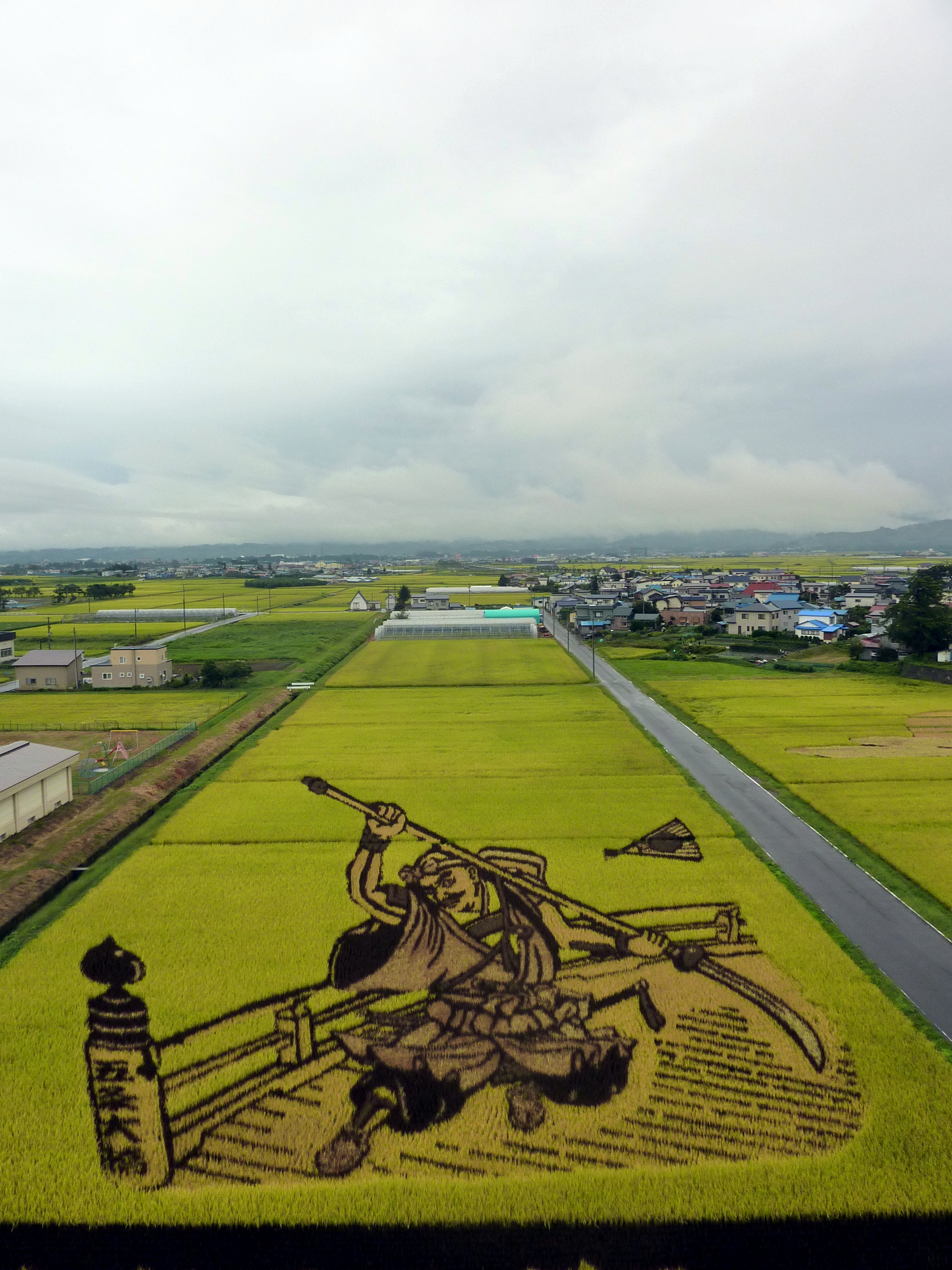
2010 rice paddy art

Inakadate (田舎館村, Inakadate-mura) is a village in Aomori Prefecture, Japan. As of 31 January 2023, the village had an estimated population of 7,420 in 2845 households, and a population density of 362 persons per km^{2}. The total area of the village is 22.35 square kilometres (8.63 sq mi).

== Geography ==
Inakadate occupies the flatlands within Minamitsugaru District of south-central Aomori, east of the city of Hirosaki.

=== Neighbouring municipalities ===
Aomori Prefecture

- Fujisaki
- Hirakawa
- Hirosaki
- Kuroishi

=== Climate ===
The village has a cold humid continental climate (Köppen Dfb) characterized by warm short summers and long cold winters with heavy snowfall. The average annual temperature in Inakadate is 10.5 °C. The average annual rainfall is 1294 mm with September as the wettest month. The temperatures are highest on average in August, at around 24.1 °C, and lowest in January, at around -1.9 °C.

== Demographics ==
Per Japanese census data, the population of Inakadate has decreased steadily over the past 60 years.

Historical population
Year	Pop.	±% p.a.
1960	11,509	—
1970	10,062	−1.33%
1980	10,053	−0.01%
1990	9,370	−0.70%
2000	8,835	−0.59%
2010	8,153	−0.80%
2020	7,326	−1.06%

== History ==
During the Edo period, the area around Inakadate was controlled by the Tsugaru clan of Hirosaki Domain. After the Meiji Restoration, it became part of Minamitsugaru District. On April 1, 1889, Inakadate was proclaimed as a village with the establishment of the modern municipalities system. On April 1, 1955, it annexed neighboring Kodaji Village, but lost a portion of its territory to Onoe Town on October 1, 1956.

== Government ==
Inakadate has a mayor-council form of government with a directly elected mayor and a unicameral village legislature of eight members. Minamitsugari District contributes one member to the Aomori Prefectural Assembly. In terms of national politics, the village is part of Aomori 3rd district of the lower house of the Diet of Japan.

== Economy ==
The economy of Inakadate is heavily dependent on agriculture, notably rice and horticulture.

== Education ==
Inakadate has one public elementary school and one public junior high school operated by the village government. The village does not have a high school.

== Transportation ==
=== Railway ===
East Japan Railway Company (JR East) - Ōu Main Line, Gono Line

- Kawabe

Kōnan Railway Company - Kōnan Railway Kōnan Line

- Inakadate - Tamboāto

=== Highway ===
- National Route 102

== Local attractions ==
- Tareyanagi Site, a Yayoi-period ruin and National Historic Site

=== Art stimulus ===
In 1993, as part of a revitalization effort, Inakadate began creating rice paddy art, murals of art using rice paddy fields. The people were looking for a way to revitalize their village. Archaeology showed that rice had been grown in the area for more than 2000 years. To honor this history, the villagers started a rice field behind the town hall. The villagers cultivated and used four different types of heirloom and modern strains of rice to create a giant picture in the field. To allow viewing of the whole picture, a mock castle tower 22 meters high was erected at the village office. In 2006, more than 200,000 people visited the village to see the art.

To encourage visitation outside of rice growing season, the village began using the same fields for winter rice paddy art in 2016. The designs are created by compressing snow into patterns by walking on it with snowshoes.

== Notable people from Inakadate ==
- Tochinoumi Teruyoshi, sumo wrestler
