= Chōshichiyachi Shell Mound =

Jōmon period shell midden in Hachinohe, Japan

Chōshichiyachi Shell Midden
- 長七谷地貝塚 (Japanese)
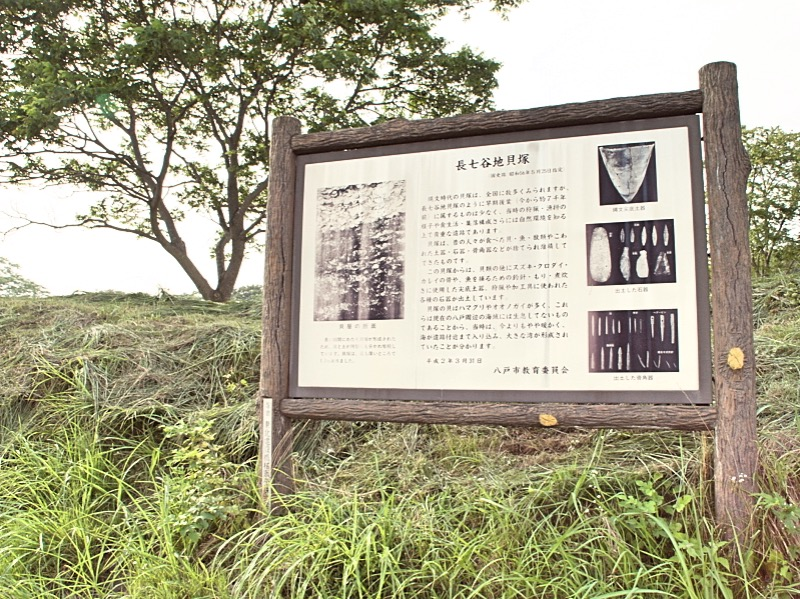
- Chōshichiyachi Shell Midden

- Chōshichiyachi Shell Midden Chōshichiyachi Shell Mound (Japan)
- 40°34′19.2″N 141°27′31.7″E
- Type: shell midden
- Periods: Jōmon period
- Location: Hachinohe, Aomori, Japan
- Region: Tōhoku region

History
- Built: c.7000 BC

Site notes
- Height: 20 metres (66 ft)
- Area: 30,000 square metres (7.4 acres)
- Excavation dates: 1958, 1977-1979
- Archaeologists: Aomori Prefectural Cultural Heritage Expert Committee
- Public access: Yes
- National Historic Site of Japan

The Chōshichiyachi Shell Midden (長七谷地貝塚, Chōshichiyachi kaizuka) is an archaeological site in the Ichikawa-chō neighborhood of the city of Hachinohe, Aomori Prefecture, in the Tōhoku region of northern Japan, with an initial Jōmon period shell midden and traces of a settlement. The site was designated a National Historic Site of Japan in 1981.

== Overview ==
During the initial Jōmon period (approximately 7000 years ago), sea levels were some three meters higher than at present, and the ambient temperature was also 2 deg C higher. During this period, the Tōhoku region was inhabited by the Jōmon people, many of whom lived in coastal settlements. The middens associated with such settlements contain bone, botanical material, mollusc shells, sherds, lithics, and other artifacts and ecofacts associated with the now-vanished inhabitants, and these features, provide a useful source into the diets and habits of Jōmon society. Most of these middens are found along the Pacific coast of Japan.

The location of the shell midden is on a river terrace on the right bank of the Gonohe River in northern Hachinohe, at an elevation of approximately 10 to 20 meters above the presents sea level. At the time it was constructed, it would have overlooked a shallow bay with extensive tidal flats on the Pacific Ocean coast. The existence of the shell midden was already known to academia by the Taisho period. The area was first surveyed by the Aomori Prefectural Cultural Heritage Expert Committee in 1958, and excavated extensively from 1977-1979 when the site became endangered by the construction on the nearby Kikyono Industrial Park.

The site dates from the initial Jōmon period (7000 BC) and is thus one of the oldest shell midden sites known in northern Japan. It predates the Sannai-Maruyama Site by more than 2000 years. The shell midden consisted of four separate middens with an average thickness of 40-50 centimeters, increasing to 1.1 meters near the remains of pit dwellings, indicating that the site had been occupied for many centuries.

The midden contained the remnants of some 30 varieties of shellfish, bones of nine types of animals, three types of birds, birds and at least 20 different varieties of fish and an extremely large number of Hamaguri shells, indicating the importance of these clams in the early Jōmon period diet. Some of the shellfish in the midden are no longer found in the area, indicating that the ocean temperatures during this period were warmer than at present. The midden also contained shards of Akamido-style Jōmon pottery with pointed bottoms and marked with striped cord-patterns, as well as stone tools and implements and objects fashioned from bone (fishing hooks, needles, hairpins, etc.).

Some of the fish bones were oceanic species (such as bonito and sea bass), and the presence of combination fish hooks and open socketed harpoon heads indicates that the local inhabitants had the capability of offshore fishing as well as gathering of marine resources from inner bay areas.

Many of the artifacts recovered from the site are on display at the Hachinohe City Museum. There are no public facilities at the site, which has been backfilled and is now located under rice paddies. There is only a billboard with some explanatory text and photographs. The site is approximately a 30 minute walk from the Aoimori Railway Mutsu-Ichikawa Station.

The site has been submitted for inscription on the UNESCO World Heritage List as one of the Jōmon Archaeological Sites in Hokkaidō, Northern Tōhoku, and other regions

== See also ==
- List of Historic Sites of Japan (Aomori)
