= Sannohe =

Sannohe 三戸町
- Town
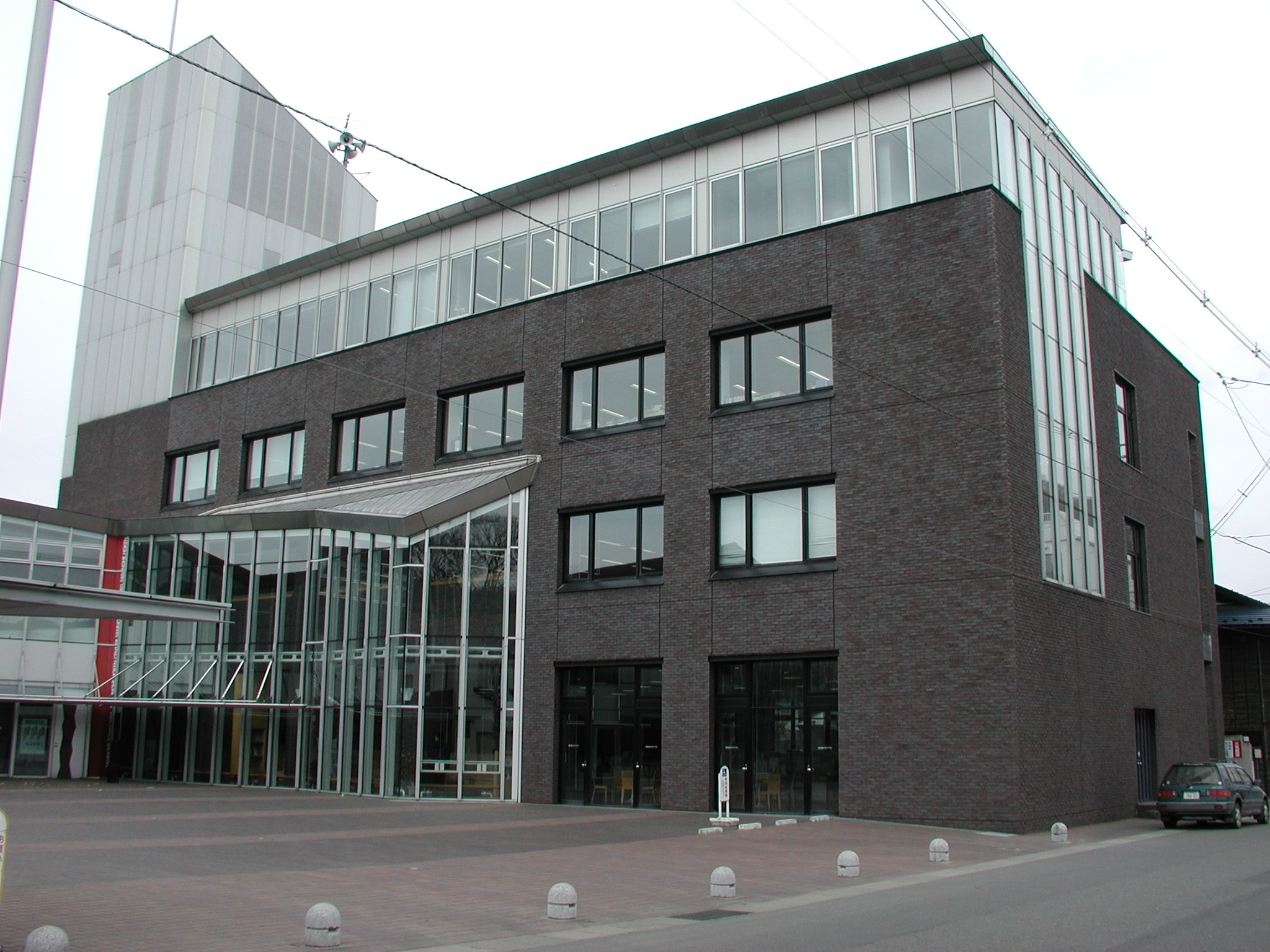
- Sannohe Town Hall

- Flag Seal
- Location of Sannohe in Aomori Prefecture

- Coordinates: 40°22′42″N 141°15′33″E
- Country: Japan
- Region: Tōhoku
- Prefecture: Aomori
- District: Sannohe

Area
  - Total: 151.79 km^{2} (58.61 sq mi)

Population (December 31, 2025)
  - Total: 8,561
  - Density: 56.40/km^{2} (146.1/sq mi)
- Time zone: UTC+9 (Japan Standard Time)
- Phone number: 0179-20-1111
- Address: Zaifukojimachi, Sannohe-machi, Sannohe-gun, Aomori-ken 039-0132
- Climate: Cfa/Dfa
- Website: Official website
- Symbols
- Bird: Eurasian scops-owl
- Flower: Far East Amur adonis
- Tree: Princess tree

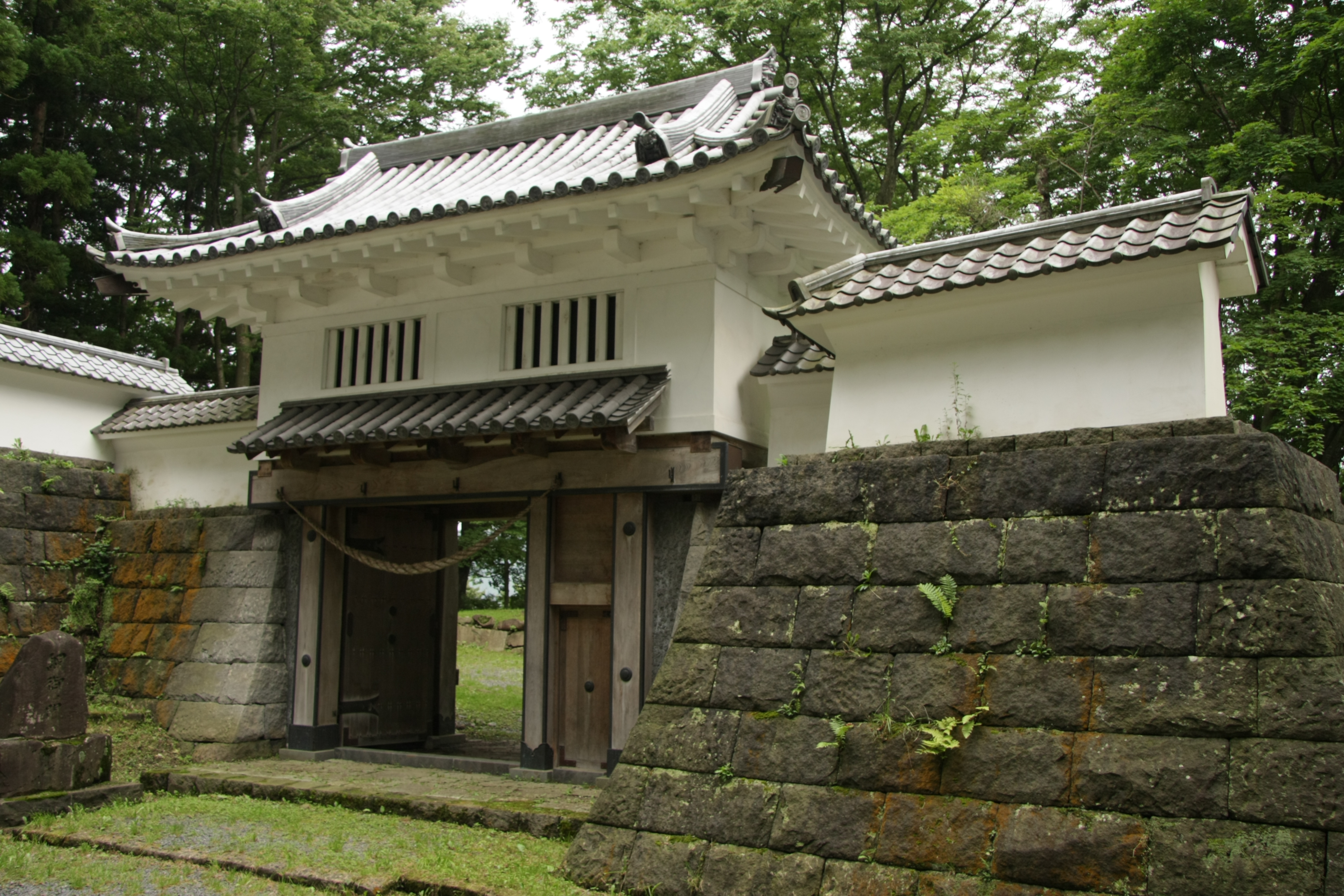
Reconstructed gate of Sannohe Castle

Sannohe (三戸町, Sannohe-machi) is a town located in Aomori Prefecture, Japan. As of 31 December 2025, the town had an estimated population of 8,561 in 4099 households, and a population density of 56 persons per km^{2}. The total area of the town is 151.79 square kilometres (58.61 sq mi).

== Geography ==
Sannohe occupies an inland area in southeast corner of Aomori Prefecture, south of the Hakkōda Mountains. The terrain is relatively flat, with mountains extending in the northwestern part of the town. The Mabechi River flows from north to south through the center of the town.

=== Neighbouring municipalities ===
Akita Prefecture

- Kazuno

Aomori Prefecture

- Nanbu
- Shingō
- Takko

Iwate Prefecture

- Ninohe

== Climate ==
The town has a cold maritime climate characterized by cool short summers and long cold winters with heavy snowfall (Köppen climate classification Cfa). The average annual temperature in Sannohe is 10.2 °C. The average annual rainfall is 1259 mm with September as the wettest month. The temperatures are highest on average in August, at around 22.9 °C, and lowest in January, at around -2.5 °C.

Climate data for Sannohe (1991−2020 normals, extremes 1976−present)
Month	Jan	Feb	Mar	Apr	May	Jun	Jul	Aug	Sep	Oct	Nov	Dec	Year
Record high °C (°F)	14.4 (57.9)	18.2 (64.8)	21.6 (70.9)	30.0 (86.0)	34.7 (94.5)	35.6 (96.1)	37.7 (99.9)	37.4 (99.3)	35.0 (95.0)	28.7 (83.7)	25.2 (77.4)	18.7 (65.7)	37.7 (99.9)
Mean daily maximum °C (°F)	2.4 (36.3)	3.5 (38.3)	7.8 (46.0)	14.9 (58.8)	20.8 (69.4)	23.9 (75.0)	27.0 (80.6)	28.3 (82.9)	24.7 (76.5)	18.6 (65.5)	11.8 (53.2)	5.0 (41.0)	15.7 (60.3)
Daily mean °C (°F)	−1.8 (28.8)	−1.2 (29.8)	2.4 (36.3)	8.5 (47.3)	14.2 (57.6)	18.0 (64.4)	21.8 (71.2)	22.9 (73.2)	18.8 (65.8)	12.1 (53.8)	6.0 (42.8)	0.6 (33.1)	10.2 (50.3)
Mean daily minimum °C (°F)	−6.3 (20.7)	−6.1 (21.0)	−2.8 (27.0)	2.1 (35.8)	8.1 (46.6)	12.9 (55.2)	17.6 (63.7)	18.7 (65.7)	14.1 (57.4)	6.5 (43.7)	0.8 (33.4)	−3.6 (25.5)	5.2 (41.3)
Record low °C (°F)	−17.6 (0.3)	−20.2 (−4.4)	−17.7 (0.1)	−8.7 (16.3)	−1.3 (29.7)	1.9 (35.4)	7.6 (45.7)	8.9 (48.0)	1.8 (35.2)	−2.9 (26.8)	−8.1 (17.4)	−17.0 (1.4)	−20.2 (−4.4)
Average precipitation mm (inches)	49.4 (1.94)	49.1 (1.93)	63.3 (2.49)	65.0 (2.56)	81.9 (3.22)	96.4 (3.80)	161.4 (6.35)	160.3 (6.31)	159.4 (6.28)	114.0 (4.49)	66.1 (2.60)	64.8 (2.55)	1,131.1 (44.53)
Average snowfall cm (inches)	111 (44)	109 (43)	77 (30)	5 (2.0)	0 (0)	0 (0)	0 (0)	0 (0)	0 (0)	0 (0)	3 (1.2)	65 (26)	367 (144)
Average precipitation days (≥ 1.0 mm)	10.4	10.2	10.4	10.2	10.3	9.2	11.6	11.7	11.1	10.5	11.2	10.6	127.4
Average snowy days (≥ 3 cm)	14.9	14.3	9.8	0.6	0	0	0	0	0	0	0.4	8.4	48.4
Mean monthly sunshine hours	102.3	105.3	153.5	181.5	190.7	157.6	136.5	152.7	141.2	148.9	121.9	102.6	1,694.7
Source: Japan Meteorological Agency

== Demographics ==
Per Japanese census data, the population of Sannohe peaked in the 1950s has steadily declined since. It is now less than it was a century ago.

Historical population
Year	Pop.	±% p.a.
1920	12,714	—
1930	13,644	+0.71%
1940	13,768	+0.09%
1950	17,614	+2.49%
1960	17,332	−0.16%
1970	16,184	−0.68%
1980	15,506	−0.43%
1990	14,440	−0.71%
2000	13,223	−0.88%
2010	11,300	−1.56%
2020	9,082	−2.16%

== History ==
The area around Sannohe has been inhabited since ancient times, and numerous Jōmon period remains have been found. During the Kamakura period it was the center of the domains awarded to Nanbu Mitsuyuki, a retainer of Minamoto no Yoritomo after the defeat of the Northern Fujiwara clan in 1187. It remained under the control of the Nanbu clan through the Sengoku period as a castle town centered on Sannohe Castle. During the Edo period, came under the control of Morioka Domain, and a daikansho was established on the site of the former castle. It was proclaimed a town after Meiji Restoration, with the establishment of the modern municipalities system on 1 April 1889. On 20 March 1955, the three neighboring villages of Sarube, Tomesaki and Tonai merged with Sannohe.

== Government ==
Sannohe has a mayor-council form of government with a directly elected mayor and a unicameral town council of 14 members. Sannohe is part of Sannohe District which contributes three members to the Aomori Prefectural Assembly. In terms of national politics, the city is part of Aomori 2nd district of the lower house of the Diet of Japan.

== Economy ==
The economy of Sannohe is heavily dependent on agriculture, with tobacco as the main crop, followed by rice and apples. Due to its many historical relics, the town is also developing tourism as a mainstay of the local economy.

== Education ==
Sannohe has two public elementary schools and one public middle schools operated by the town government and one public high school operated by the Aomori Prefectural Board of Education.

== Transportation ==
=== Railway ===
Aoimori Railway Company - Aoimori Railway Line

- Metoki

=== Highway ===
- National Route 4
- National Route 104

== International relations ==
- Sister city with Tamworth, New South Wales, Australia since 2001

== Local attractions ==
- Nakuidake Prefectural Natural Park
- Sannohe Castle, a reconstructed Japanese castle
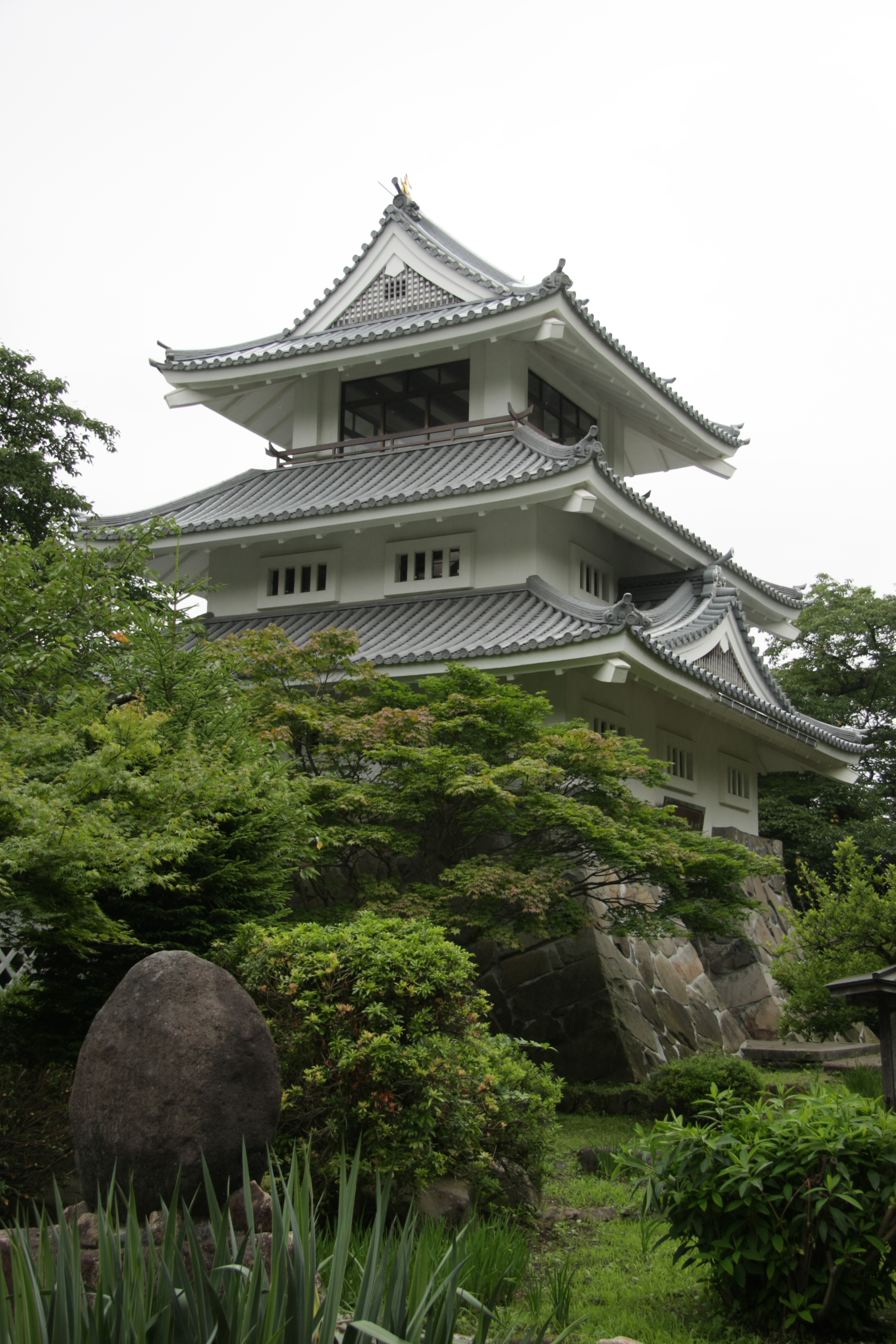
Sannohe Castle

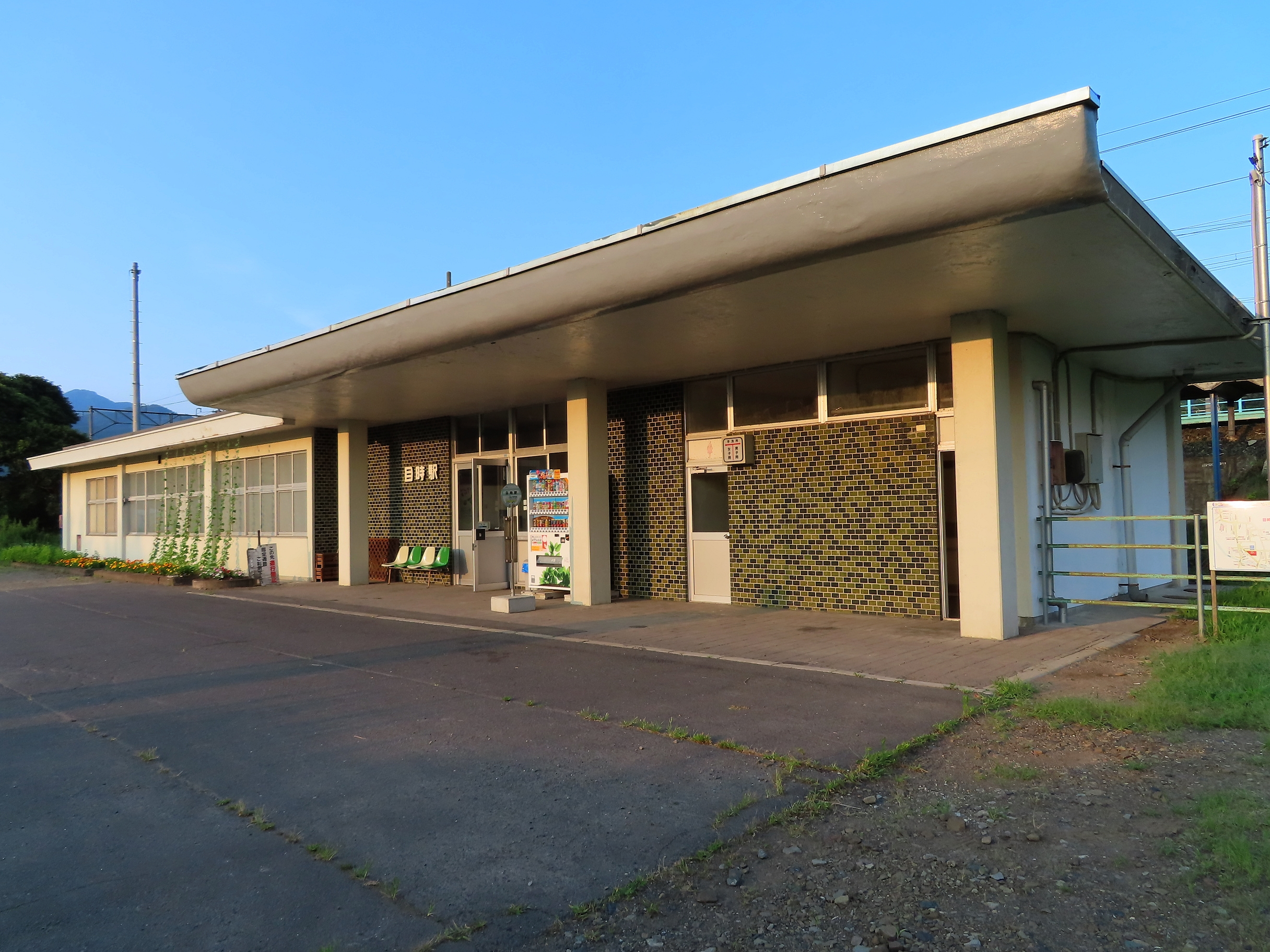
Metoki train station

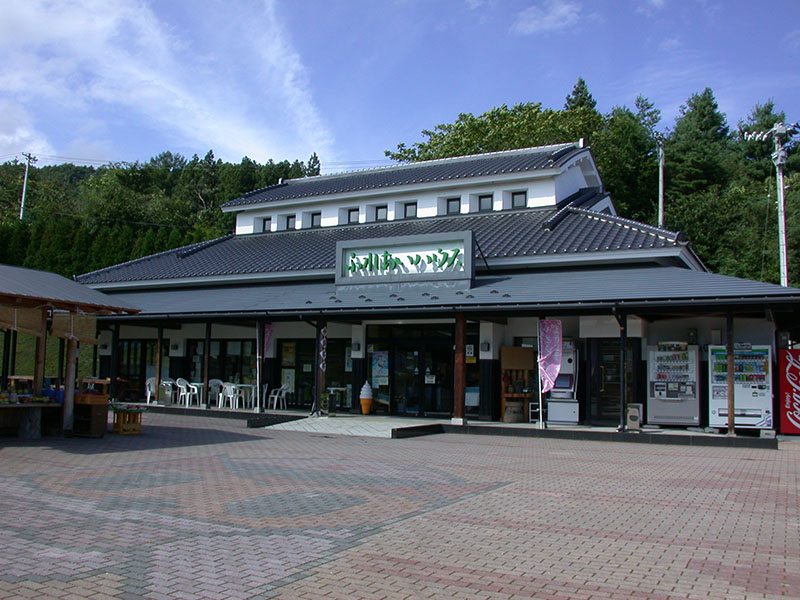
Sannohe road station

== Noted people from Sannohe ==
- Noboru Baba (1927–2001), illustrator, manga artist
- Kagamisato Kiyoji, sumo wrestler
- Kanpei Matsuo, politician
