= Sannohe Castle =

Japanese castle

- 三戸城
- Sannohe, Aomori Prefecture, Japan
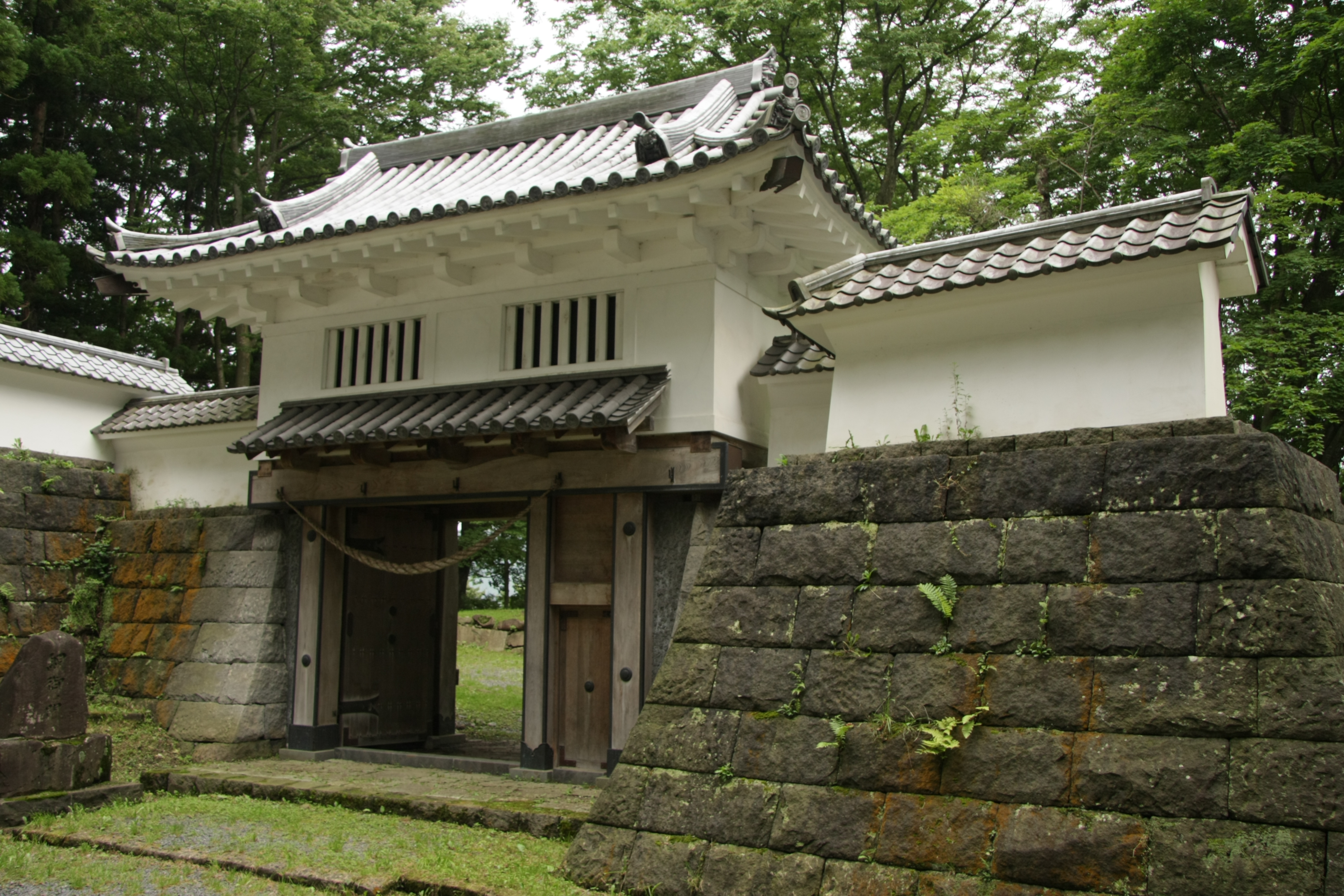
- Reconstructed gate of Sannohe Castle

Site information
- Type: Hirayama-style Japanese castle
- Open to the public: Yes
- Condition: Reconstructed Donjon

Location
- Sannohe Castle
- Location within Aomori Prefecture Location within Japan
- Coordinates: 40°22′52″N 141°15′51″E

Site history
- Built: 1558-1564
- Built by: Nanbu Harumasa
- In use: Muromachi to Sengoku periods
- Demolished: 1634

Sannohe Castle (三戸城, Sannohe-jō) was a Muromachi period Japanese castle located in the center of what is now the town of Sannohe, in Sannohe District of Aomori Prefecture, in the Tōhoku region of northern Japan. It was located on a river terrace of the Mabechi River, which formed part of its natural defenses. The castle site was designated a National Historic Site of Japan in March 2022.

== History ==
The actual date of Sannohe Castle’s foundation is unknown; however, it was one of a series of fortifications established by the Nanbu clan in the late Kamakura period or early Muromachi period when the clan relocated its seat from Kai Province to Mutsu Province and started to secure its control over the frontier Nukanobu District. The clan residence remained at nearby Shōjujidate Castle in what is now the town of Nanbu until that fortified house was destroyed in an uprising in June 1539. The 24th hereditary chieftain of the clan, Nanbu Harumasa, relocated his seat to nearby Sannohe Castle.

After the death of Nanbu Harumasa in 1582, the clan split into several competing factions. In 1590, the Sannohe faction led by Nanbu Nobunao organized a coalition of most of the Nambu clans and pledged allegiance to Toyotomi Hideyoshi at the Siege of Odawara. In return, he was recognized as chieftain of the Nanbu clans, and confirmed as daimyō of his existing holdings in the northern districts of Mutsu Province. However, Kunohe Masazane, leader of a rival faction, felt that he had a stronger claim to the title of clan chieftain, and immediately rose in rebellion. After the suppression of the Kunohe Rebellion, Sannohe castle was modernized with stone ramparts. The aging castle was badly damaged by a fire at the beginning of the 17th century. After the establishment of the Tokugawa shogunate, the clan seat was relocated south to Morioka Castle in 1634, and Sannohe Castle was allowed to fall into ruins.

In 1684, Morioka Domain established a daikansho, constructing a jin'ya on the site of the old castle.

After the Meiji restoration, one of the gates was donated to a local temple, and the remaining structures were pulled down. The area later became the Shiroyama Prefectural Park (城山県立公園, Shiroyama Kenritsu Koen). In 1967, a faux-tenshu was constructed to serve as a local history museum, even though there is no historical evidence to indicate that such a structure existed at any point in the castle’s history. In 1989, one of the gates of the castle was also re-constructed.

== Description ==
Sannohe Castle is located at a strategic junction of the Ōshū Kaidō with the Mabechi River and one of its tributaries, the Appigawa. The castle is situated on a long and narrow hilltop with dimensions of approximately 500 meters by 200 meters, with a sheer 70 meter sides, extending northwest to southeast. This area was divided into 20 enclosures at various levels, each surrounded by earthen walls. The main bailey is the highest and largest enclosure, with dimensions of 100 by 200 meters. Lower enclosures held the residences of relatives and important retainers, as well as the garrison, stables, and several ponds. In the Edo period, the most important enclosures were rebuilt with stone walls, and gates.

== See also ==
- List of Historic Sites of Japan (Aomori)
