= Misawa Airport =

Civilian airport in Misawa, Aomori Prefecture, Japan

Misawa Airport 三沢飛行場
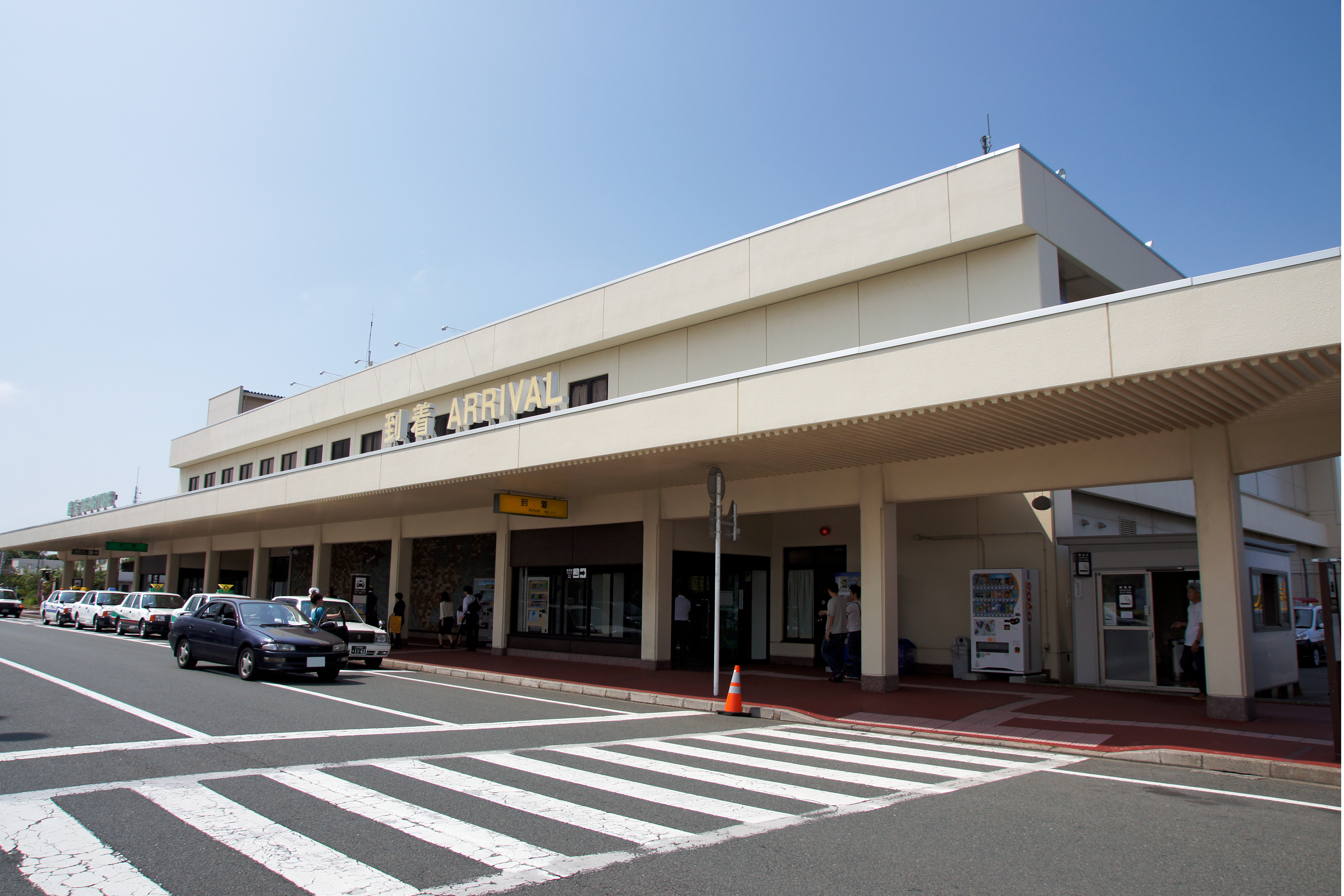
- Terminal building
- IATA: MSJ; ICAO: RJSM

Summary
- Airport type: Public / Military
- Owner: Ministry of Defense (airfield); Ministry of Land, Infrastructure and Transport (civilian terminals)
- Operator: United States Air Force (airfield); Misawa Airport Terminal Co., Ltd. (civilian terminals)
- Location: Misawa, Aomori Prefecture, Japan
- Elevation AMSL: 119 ft (36 m)
- Coordinates: 40°42′19″N 141°22′19″E

Map
- Location within Aomori Prefecture Location within Japan

Runways
Direction	Length		Surface
Direction	m	ft	Surface
10/28^{A}	3,000	9,843	Asphalt/concrete

Statistics (2024)
- Passengers: 336,869
- Cargo (metric tonnes): 281
- Aircraft movement: 3,986
- Source: Japanese Ministry of Land, Infrastructure, Transport and Tourism

Misawa Airport (三沢飛行場, Misawa Hikōjō) (IATA: MSJ, ICAO: RJSM) is an airport in Misawa, a city in the Aomori Prefecture of Japan. It shares facilities and airport codes with the Misawa Air Base.

== History ==
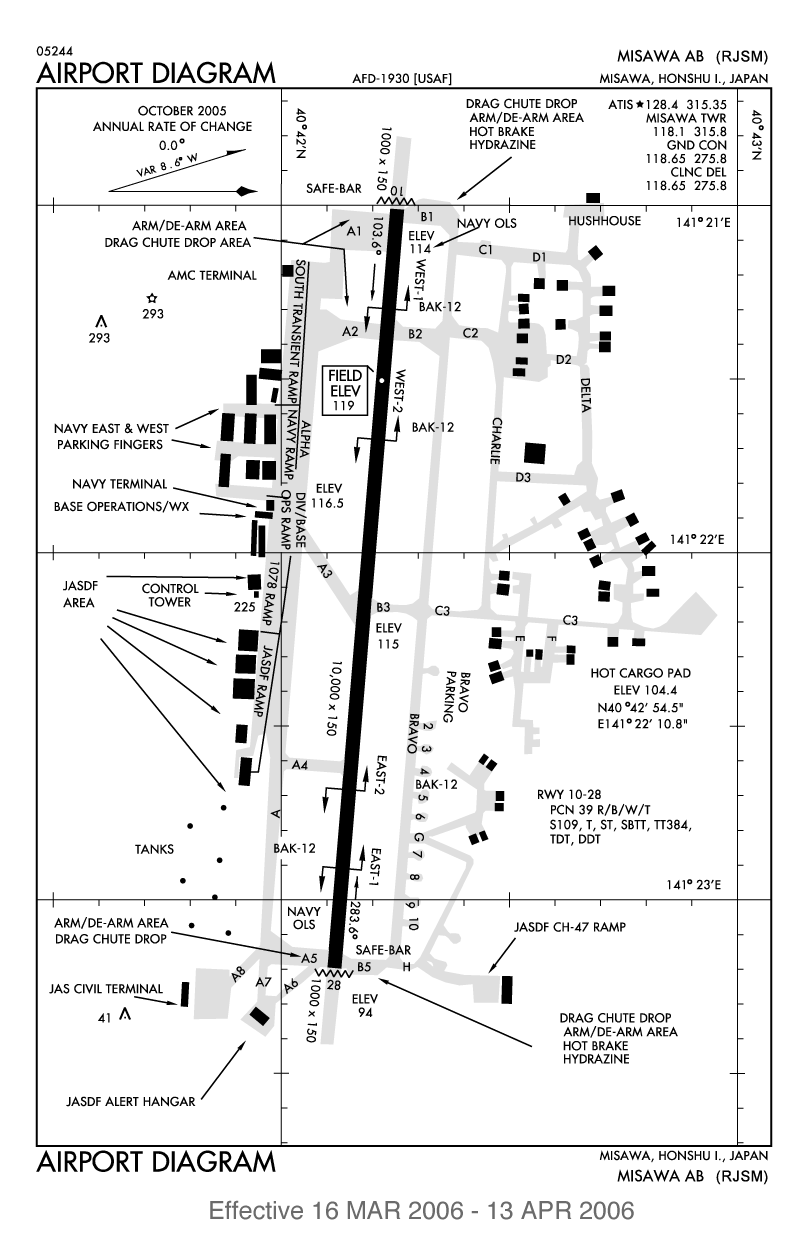
Misawa runway diagram

An Imperial Japanese Navy Air Service base was established at Misawa in 1941. The base was heavily bombed by the United States Navy in 1945, and subsequently occupied by the United States after the surrender of Japan at the end of World War II. The first Misawa Airport was opened on January 11, 1952, with Japan Airlines providing scheduled services to Haneda Airport in Tokyo and Chitose Airport in Hokkaidō. However, commercial operations were suspended from March 31, 1965, due to pressure from the United States, citing safety and security concerns, and flight operations were transferred to nearby JMSDF Hachinohe Air Base. Misawa Airport reopened on May 10, 1975, with a new terminal building completed in 1977; the terminal was expanded and rebuilt in 1986.

Initially served by Toa Airways with McDonnell Douglas DC-9 and MD-80 aircraft to Tokyo (Haneda), Sapporo (Chitose), and Osaka Itami, operations were upgraded to Airbus A300 aircraft after Toa Airways became Japan Air System in 1988. These flights were taken over by Japan Airlines after its acquisition of Japan Air System in 2002. However, with the opening of the Tōhoku Shinkansen to Hachinohe in December 2002, the number of passengers has decreased and equipment changed back to the MD-80. Flights to Chitose were discontinued in 2007.

== Airlines and destinations ==
Airlines	Destinations
Hokkaido Air System	Sapporo–Okadama
J-Air	Osaka–Itami
Japan Airlines	Tokyo–Haneda

== Ground transportation ==
=== Buses ===
Towada Kankō Electric Railway operates the following buses:

Bus stop	Bus	via	Destination	Note
Airport Terminal Bus stop	Expressway bus Airport bus	Misawa Station (Aomori)	Hon-Hachinohe Station	There are 5 round-trip services.
Misawa Kuko Onsen mae	Mi-Bus	Misawa City Hall	Misawa Station (Aomori)	
Misawa Kuko Dōri	Misawa Momoishi Line	Misawa Gyoko	Momoishi Chūō	
Misawa Kuko Dōri	Misawa Momoishi Line	Misawa City Hall・Misawa Station (Aomori)	Misawa Information Desk	
Misawa Kuko Dōri	Tetsudo Daitai Bus	Misawa City Hall・Misawa Station (Aomori)・Takashizu・Towadashi Chūō (Towadashi Station)	Sanko Seimon mae	
