= Furusato Station =

Former railway station in Japan

Coordinates: 40°38′19.47″N 141°17′05.10″E

Furusato Station 古里駅
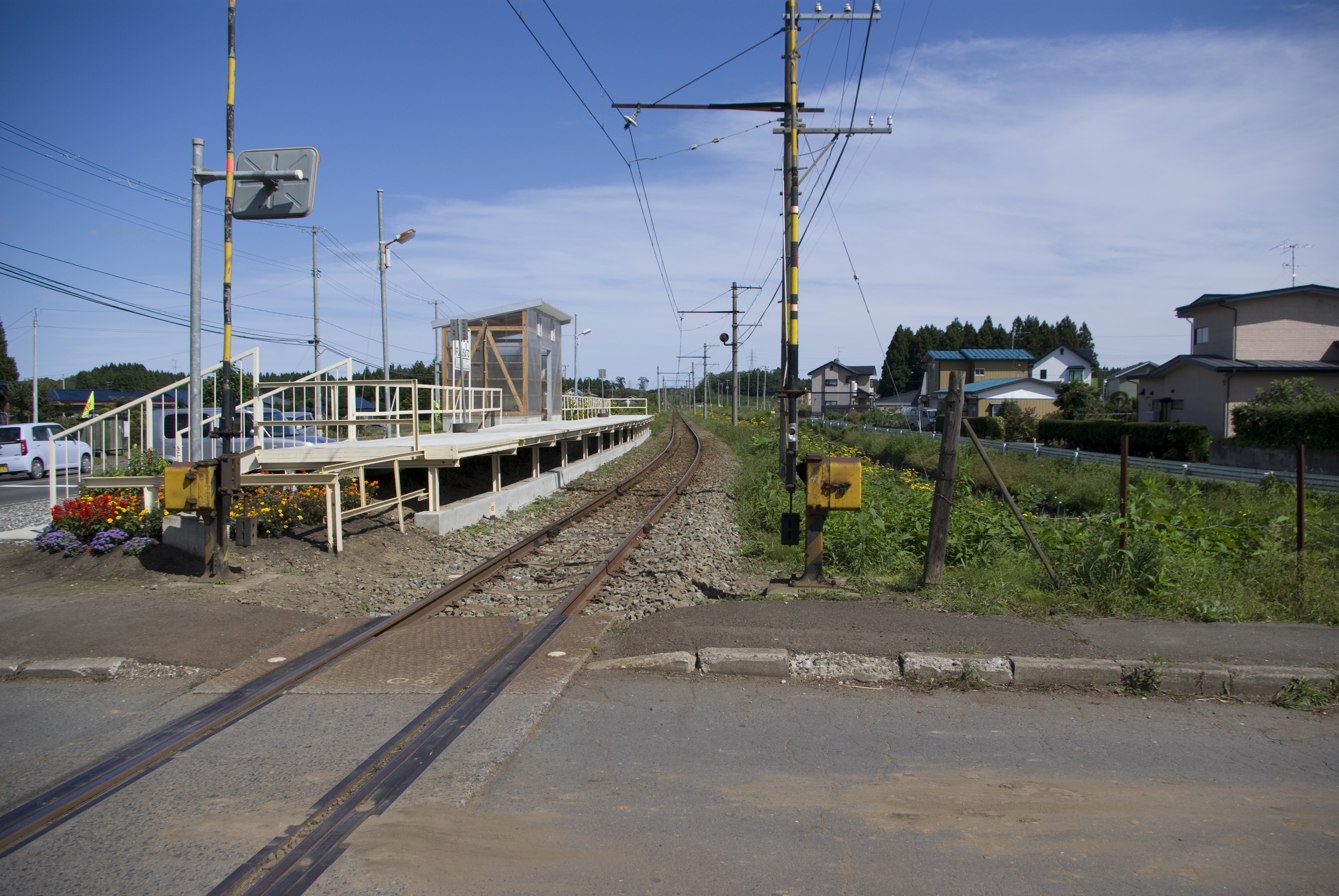

General information
- Location: Orimo Furusato, Rokunohe, Kamikita, Aomori （青森県上北郡六戸町大字折茂字古里） Japan
- Operator: Towada Kankō Electric Railway
- Line: Towada Kankō Electric Railway Line

History
- Opened: 1934
- Closed: 2012
Location

Furusato Station (古里駅, Furusato-eki) was a railway station on the Towada Kankō Electric Railway Line located in the town of Rokunohe, Aomori Prefecture, Japan. It was 8.4 rail kilometers from the terminus of the Towada Kankō Electric Railway Line at Misawa Station.

== History ==
Furusato Station was opened on December 1, 1934.

The station was closed when the Towada Kankō Electric Railway Line was discontinued on April 1, 2012.

== Lines ==
- Towada Kankō Electric Railway
  - Towada Kankō Electric Railway Line

== Station layout ==
Furusato Station had a single side platforms serving bidirectional traffic. There was a small weather shelter on the platform, but no station building. The station was unattended.

=== Platforms ===
1	■Towada Kankō Electric Railway Line	for Misawa for Takashizu, Towadashi

== Adjacent stations ==
←	Service	→
Shichihyaku	Towada Kankō Electric Railway Line	Sannōkō-mae

== See also ==
- List of railway stations in Japan
