= Kitasato-Daigaku-mae Station =

Former railway station in Japan

Coordinates: 40°37′42.40″N 141°14′9.41″E

Kitasato-Daigaku-mae Station 北里大学前駅
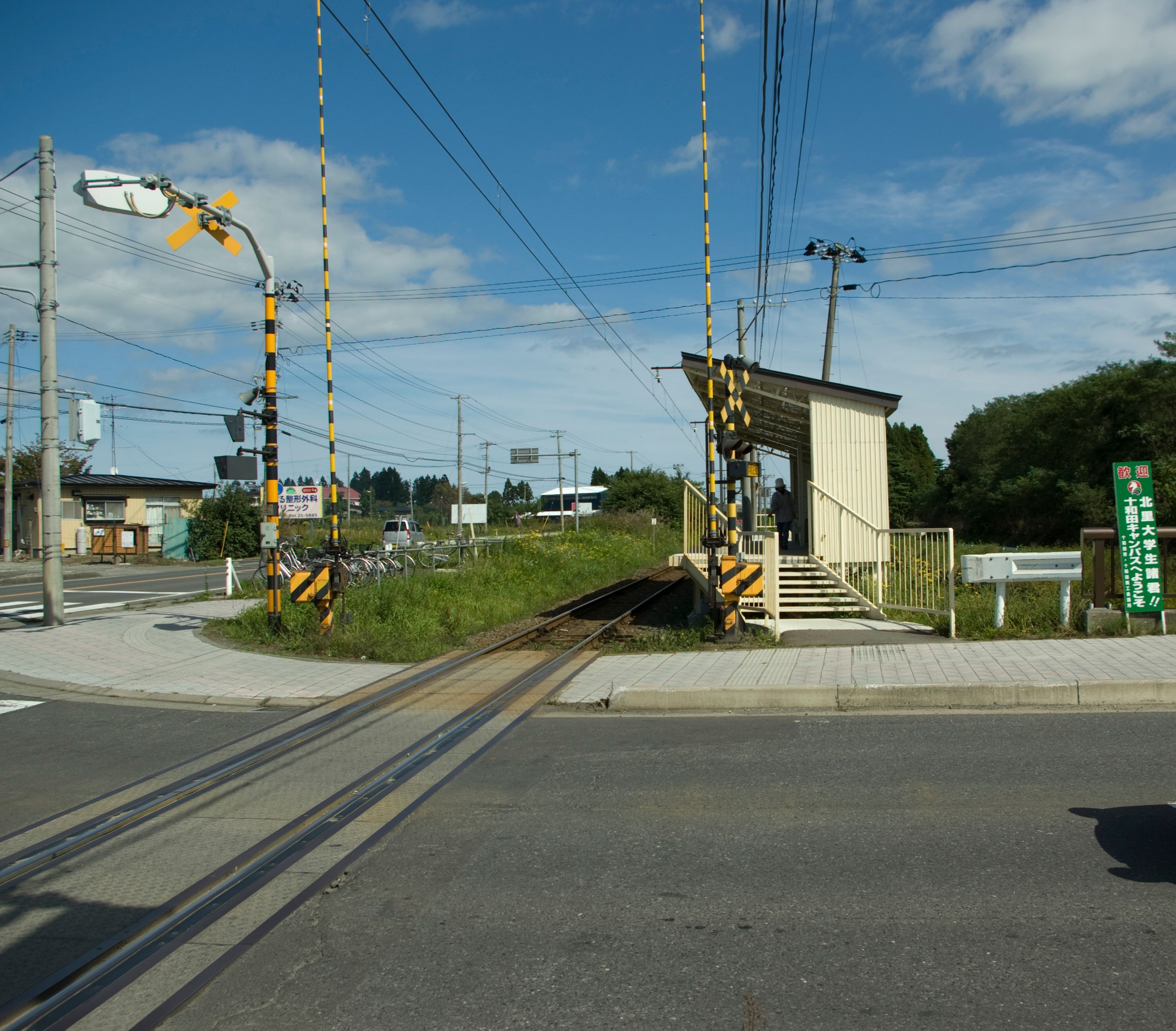
- Kitasato-Daigaku-mae

General information
- Location: Sanbongi, Towada, Aomori （青森県十和田市大字三本木字前谷地） Japan
- Operator: Towada Kankō Electric Railway
- Line: Towada Kankō Electric Railway Line

History
- Opened: 1984
- Closed: 2012
Location

Kitasato-Daigaku-mae Station (北里大学前駅, Kitasato-daigaku-mae-eki) was a railway station on the Towada Kankō Electric Railway Line located in the city of Towada, Aomori Prefecture, Japan. It was 12.7 rail kilometers from the terminus of the Towada Kankō Electric Railway Line at Misawa Station.

== History ==
Kitasato-Daigaku-mae Station was opened on April 1, 1984, to serve the nearby Towada campus of Kitasato University.

The station was closed when the Towada Kankō Electric Railway Line was discontinued on April 1, 2012.

== Lines ==
- Towada Kankō Electric Railway
  - Towada Kankō Electric Railway Line

== Station layout ==
Kitasato-Daigaku-mae Station had a single side platform serving a single track. There was a small weather shelter on the platform, but no station building.

=== Platforms ===
1	■Towada Kankō Electric Railway Line	for Misawa for Higashino Danchi, Towadashi

== Adjacent stations ==
←	Service	→
Takashizu	Towada Kankō Electric Railway Line	Kōgyōkōkō-mae

== See also ==
- List of railway stations in Japan
