= Shichihyaku Station =

Railway station in Aomori Prefecture, Japan

Coordinates: 40°38′37.19″N 141°18′20.62″E

Shichihyaku Station 七百駅
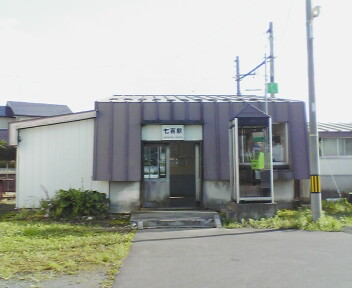
- Shichihyaku Station

General information
- Location: Ōaza Inuotose Aza Gongenzawa 14-66, Rokunohe, Kamikita, Aomori （青森県上北郡六戸町大字犬落瀬字権現沢14-66） Japan
- Operator: Towada Kankō Electric Railway
- Line: Towada Kankō Electric Railway Line

History
- Opened: 1922
- Closed: 2012
Location

Shichihyaku Station (七百駅, Shichihyaku-eki) was a railway station on the Towada Kankō Electric Railway Line located in the town of Rokunohe, Aomori Prefecture, Japan. It was 6.4 rail kilometers from the terminus of the Towada Kankō Electric Railway Line at Misawa Station.

== History ==
Shichihyaku Station was opened on September 5, 1922. It had been unattended since March 1972.

The station was closed when the Towada Kankō Electric Railway Line was discontinued on April 1, 2012.

== Lines ==
- Towada Kankō Electric Railway
  - Towada Kankō Electric Railway Line

== Station layout ==
Shichihyaku Station had a single island platform serving two tracks, connected to a small station building by an overpass. The station formerly had the rail yard for the Towada Kankō Electric Railway Line, until it was relocated to Towadashi Station in 1985.

=== Platforms ===
| 1 | ■Towada Kankō Electric Railway Line | for Misawa for Furusato, Towadashi |

== Adjacent stations ==
| ← | Service | → |
|---|---|---|
| Yanagisawa | Towada Kankō Electric Railway Line | Furusato |

== See also ==
- List of railway stations in Japan
