= Yanagisawa Station =

Railway station in the town of Rokunohe, Kamikita District, Aomori Prefecture, Japan

Coordinates: 40°38′34.56″N 141°19′15.66″E

Yanagisawa Station 柳沢駅
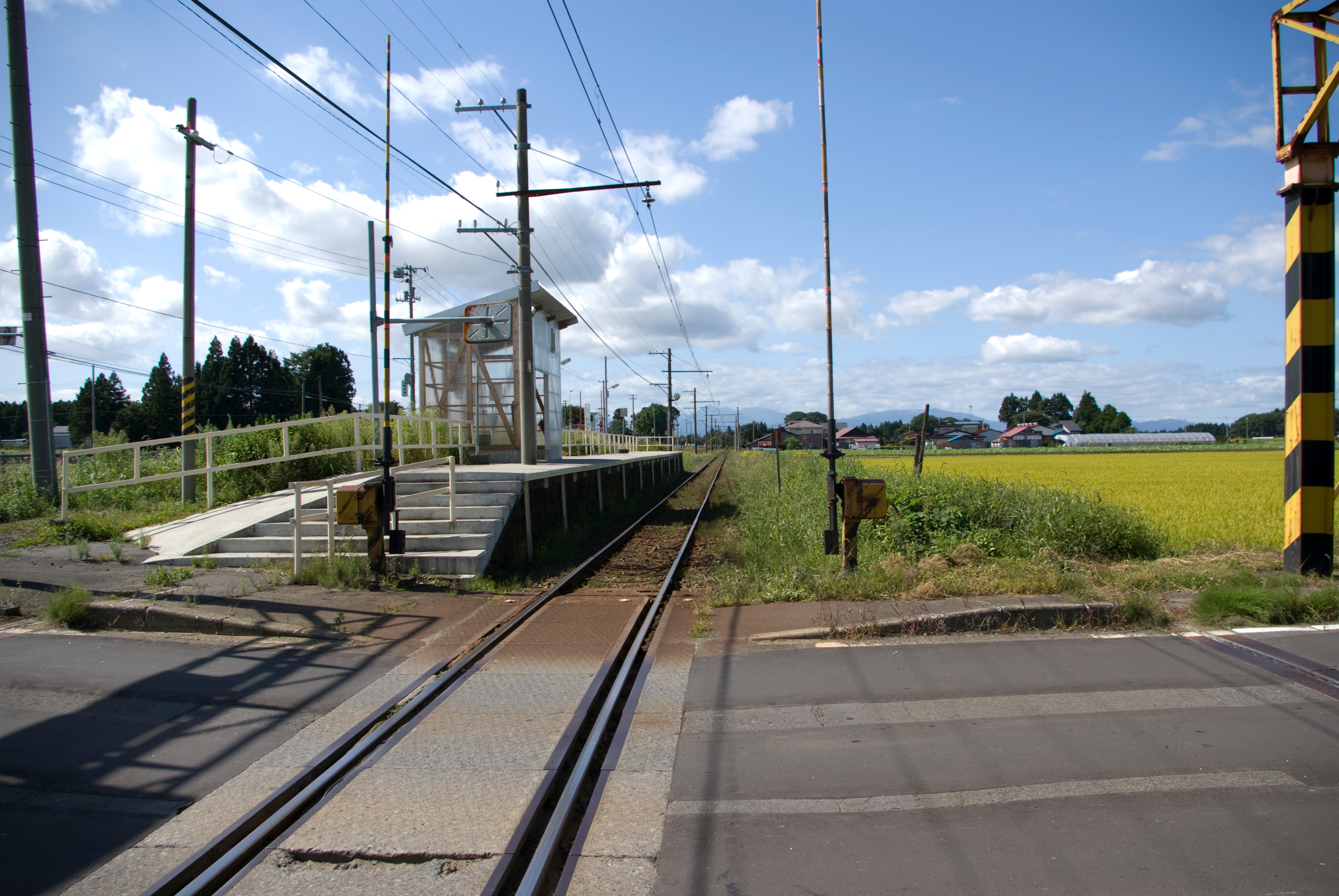

General information
- Location: Ōaza Inuotose Aza Yanagisawa, Rokunohe, Kamikita, Aomori （青森県上北郡六戸町大字犬落瀬字柳沢） Japan
- Operator: Towada Kankō Electric Railway
- Line: Towada Kankō Electric Railway Line

History
- Opened: 1932
- Closed: 2012
Location

Yanagisawa Station (柳沢駅, Yanagisawa-eki) was a railway station on the Towada Kankō Electric Railway Line located in the town of Rokunohe, Kamikita District, Aomori Prefecture, Japan. It was 5.1 kilometers from the terminus of the Towada Kankō Electric Railway Line at Misawa Station.

== History ==
Yanagisawa Station was opened on December 1, 1932.

The station was closed when the Towada Kankō Electric Railway Line was discontinued on April 1, 2012.

== Lines ==
- Towada Kankō Electric Railway
  - Towada Kankō Electric Railway Line

== Station layout ==
Yanagisawa Station had a single side platforms serving a single track. There was a small rain shelter on the platform but no station building. The station was surrounded by farmland with no houses or shops in the vicinity.

=== Platforms ===
1	■Towada Kankō Electric Railway Line	for Misawa for Shichihyaku, Towadashi

== Adjacent stations ==
←	Service	→
Ōmagari	Towada Kankō Electric Railway Line	Shichihyaku

== See also ==
- List of railway stations in Japan
