= Kōgyōkōkō-mae Station =

Former railway station in Japan

Coordinates: 40°37′38.43″N 141°13′44.91″E

Kōgyōkōkō-mae Station 工業高校前駅
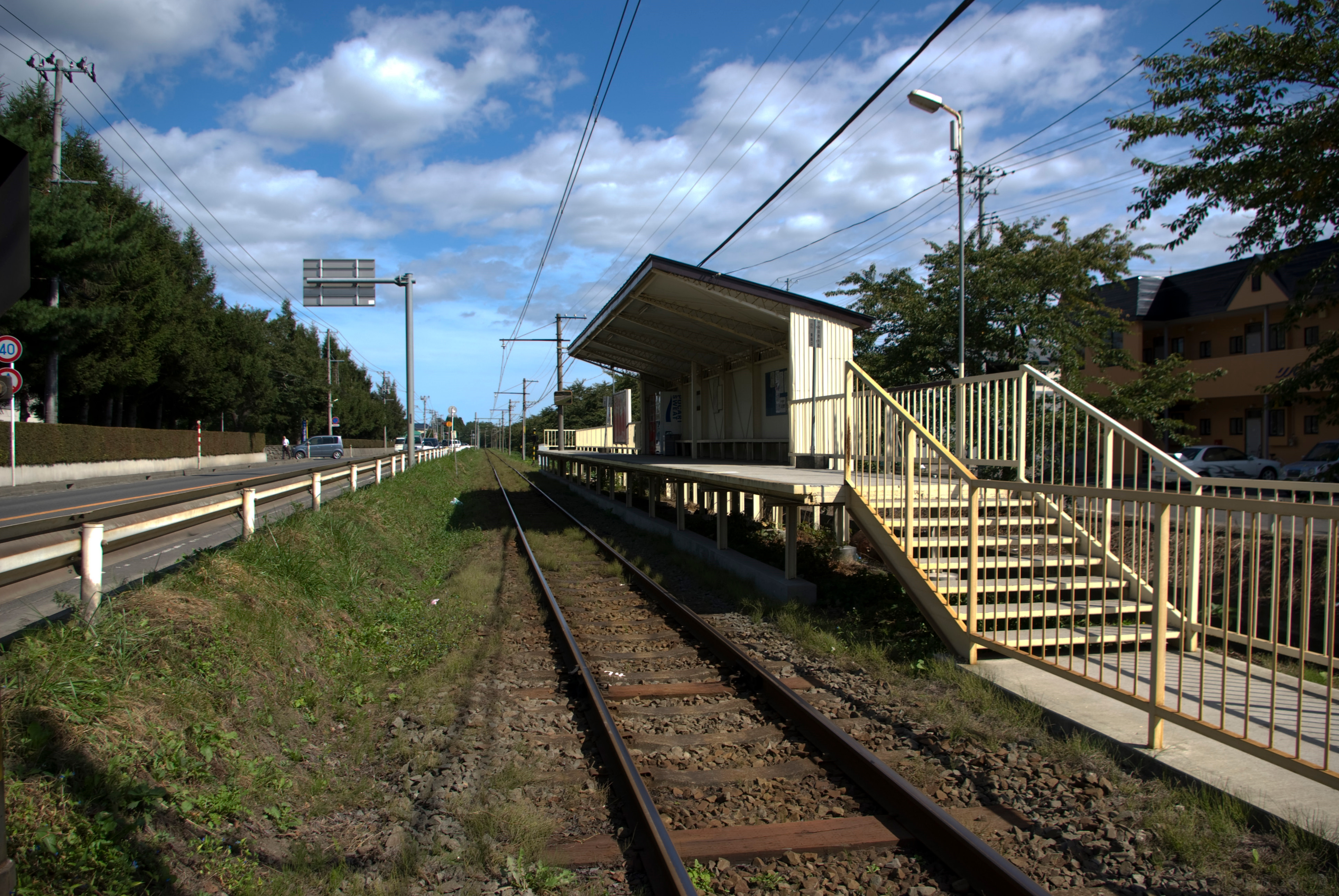

General information
- Location: Sanbongi Shimohira 215, Towada, Aomori （青森県十和田市大字三本木字下平２１５） Japan
- Operator: Towada Kankō Electric Railway
- Line: Towada Kankō Electric Railway Line

History
- Opened: 1969
- Closed: 2012
Location

Kōgyōkōkō-mae Station (工業高校前駅, Kōgyōkōkō-mae-eki) was a railway station on the Towada Kankō Electric Railway Line located in the city of Towada, Aomori Prefecture, Japan. It was 13.3 rail kilometers from the terminus of the Towada Kankō Electric Railway Line at Misawa Station.

== History ==
Kōgyōkōkō-mae Station was opened on May 1, 1969 to serve the nearby campus of the Aomori Prefectural Industrial High School.

The station was closed when the Towada Kankō Electric Railway Line was discontinued on April 1, 2012.

== Lines ==
- Towada Kankō Electric Railway
  - Towada Kankō Electric Railway Line

== Station layout ==
Kōgyōkōkō-mae Station had a single side platform serving bidirectional traffic. There was a small weather shelter on the platform, but no station building.

=== Platforms ===
1	■Towada Kankō Electric Railway Line	for Misawa for Kitasato Daigaku-mae, Towadashi

== Adjacent stations ==
←	Service	→
Higashino-Danchi	Towada Kankō Electric Railway Line	Kitasato Daigaku-mae

== See also ==
- List of railway stations in Japan
