= Sannōkō-mae Station =

Former railway station in Japan

Coordinates: 40°38′12.73″N 141°16′1.92″E

Sannōkōmae Station 三農校前駅
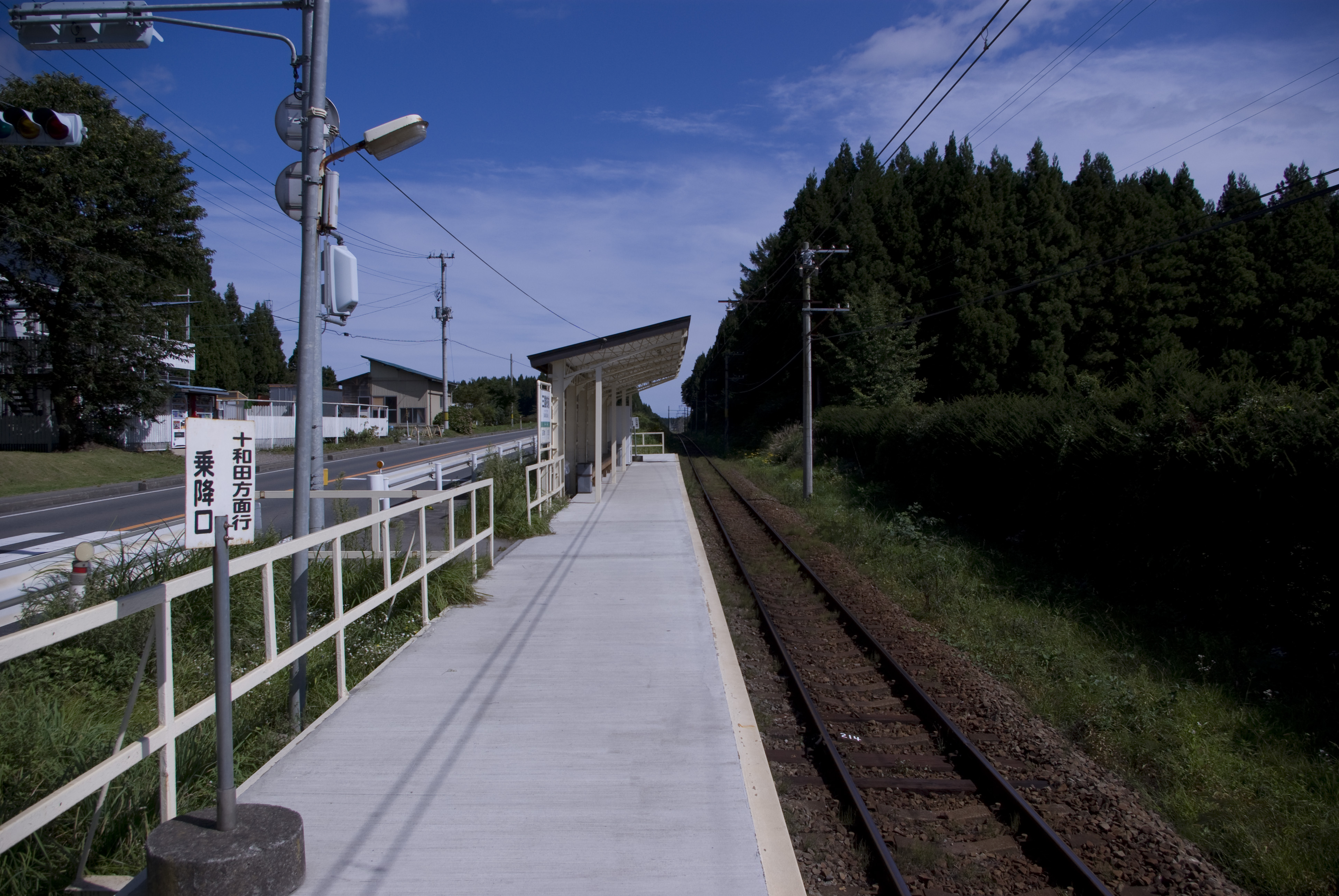

General information
- Location: Orimo Imano 247, Rokunohe, Kamikita, Aomori （青森県上北郡六戸町大字折茂字今熊２４７） Japan
- Operator: Towada Kankō Electric Railway
- Line: Towada Kankō Electric Railway Line

History
- Opened: 1969
- Closed: 2012
Location

Sannōkōmae Station (三農校前駅, Sannōkōmae-eki) was a railway station on the Towada Kankō Electric Railway Line located in the town of Rokunohe, Aomori Prefecture, Japan. It was 9.9 rail kilometers from the terminus of the Towada Kankō Electric Railway Line at Misawa Station.

== History ==
Sannōkōmae Station was opened on October 1, 1969 to serve the neighboring Aomori Prefectural Sanbongi Agricultural High School.

The station was closed when the Towada Kankō Electric Railway Line was discontinued on April 1, 2012.

== Lines ==
- Towada Kankō Electric Railway
  - Towada Kankō Electric Railway Line

== Station layout ==
Sannōkōmae Station had a single side platforms serving bidirectional traffic. There was a small weather shelter on the platform, but no station building.

=== Platforms ===
1	■Towada Kankō Electric Railway Line	for Misawa for Takashizu, Towadashi

== Adjacent stations ==
←	Service	→
Furusato	Towada Kankō Electric Railway Line	Takashizu

== See also ==
- List of railway stations in Japan
