= Ōmagari Station (Aomori) =

Railway station in Rokunohe, Aomori prefecture, Japan

Coordinates: 40°38′52.52″N 141°20′35.02″E

Ōmagari Station 大曲駅
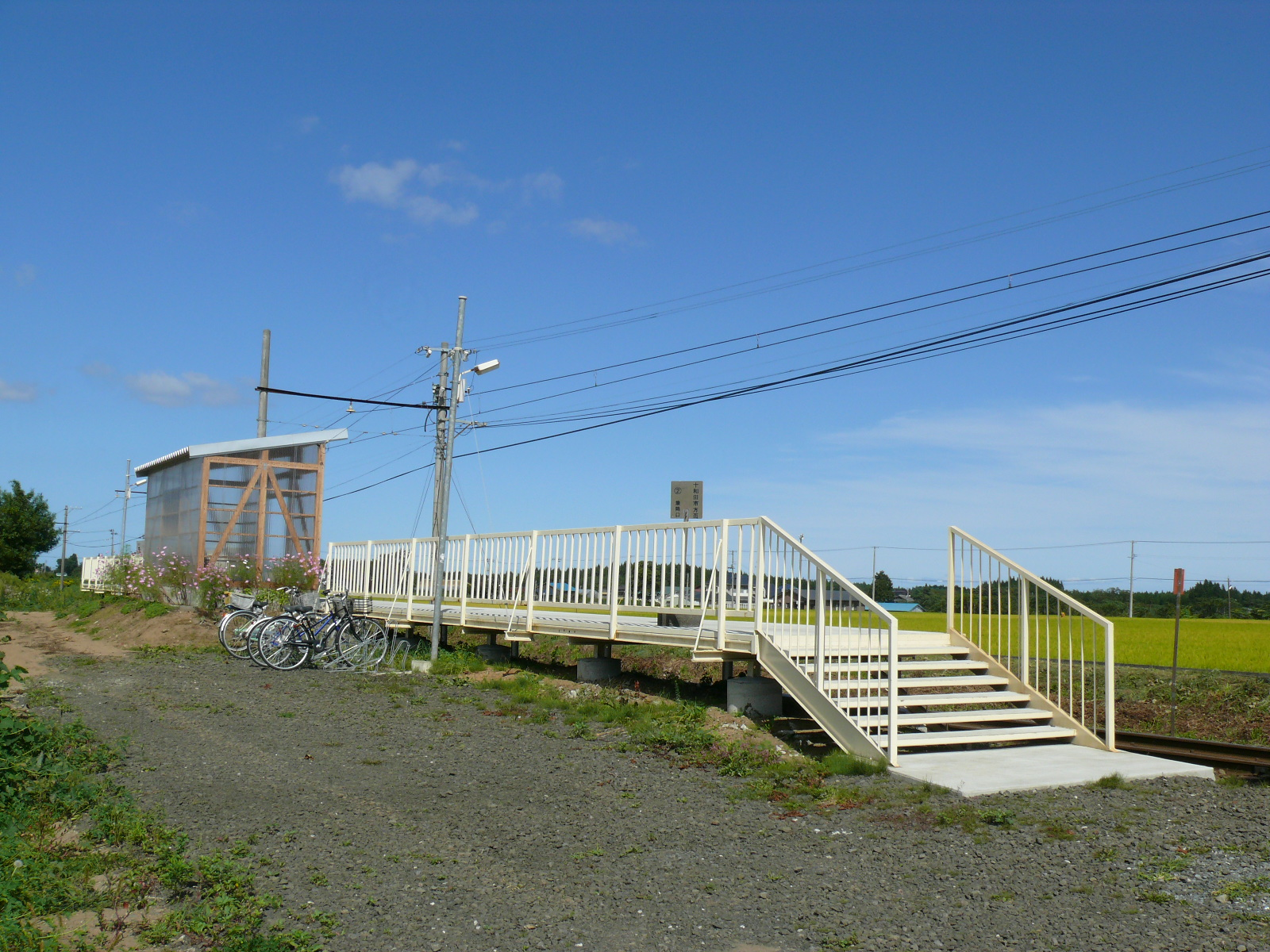
- Ōmagari Station

General information
- Location: Ōaza Inuotose Aza Yanagisawa 90-28, Rokunohe, Kamikita, Aomori （青森県上北郡六戸町大字犬落瀬字柳沢90-28） Japan
- Operator: Towada Kankō Electric Railway
- Line: Towada Kankō Electric Railway Line

History
- Opened: 1938
- Closed: 2012
Location

Ōmagari Station (大曲駅, Ōmagari-eki) was a railway station on the Towada Kankō Electric Railway Line located in the town of Rokunohe, Aomori Prefecture, Japan. It was 2.7 rail kilometers from the terminus of the Towada Kankō Electric Railway Line at Misawa Station.

== History ==
Ōmagari Station was opened on April 1, 1935 as a signal stop. It was elevated to a full station on May 24, 1938. The station had been unattended since February 21, 1953.

The station was closed when the Towada Kankō Electric Railway Line was discontinued on April 1, 2012.

== Lines ==
- Towada Kankō Electric Railway
  - Towada Kankō Electric Railway Line

== Station layout ==
Ōmagari Station had a single side platform serving bidirectional traffic. There was a small weather shelter on the platform, but no station building. The station was surrounded by farms, with no houses or shops in the vicinity.

=== Platforms ===
1	■Towada Kankō Electric Railway Line	for Misawa for Yanagisawa, Towadashi

== Adjacent stations ==
←	Service	→
Misawa	Towada Kankō Electric Railway Line	Yanagisawa

== See also ==
- List of railway stations in Japan
