= 古里駅 =

古里駅 may refer to:

- Furusato Station
- Kori Station
