= Towada Kankō Electric Railway Line =

Railway route in Japan

Towada Kankō Electric Railway Line (十和田観光電鉄線)
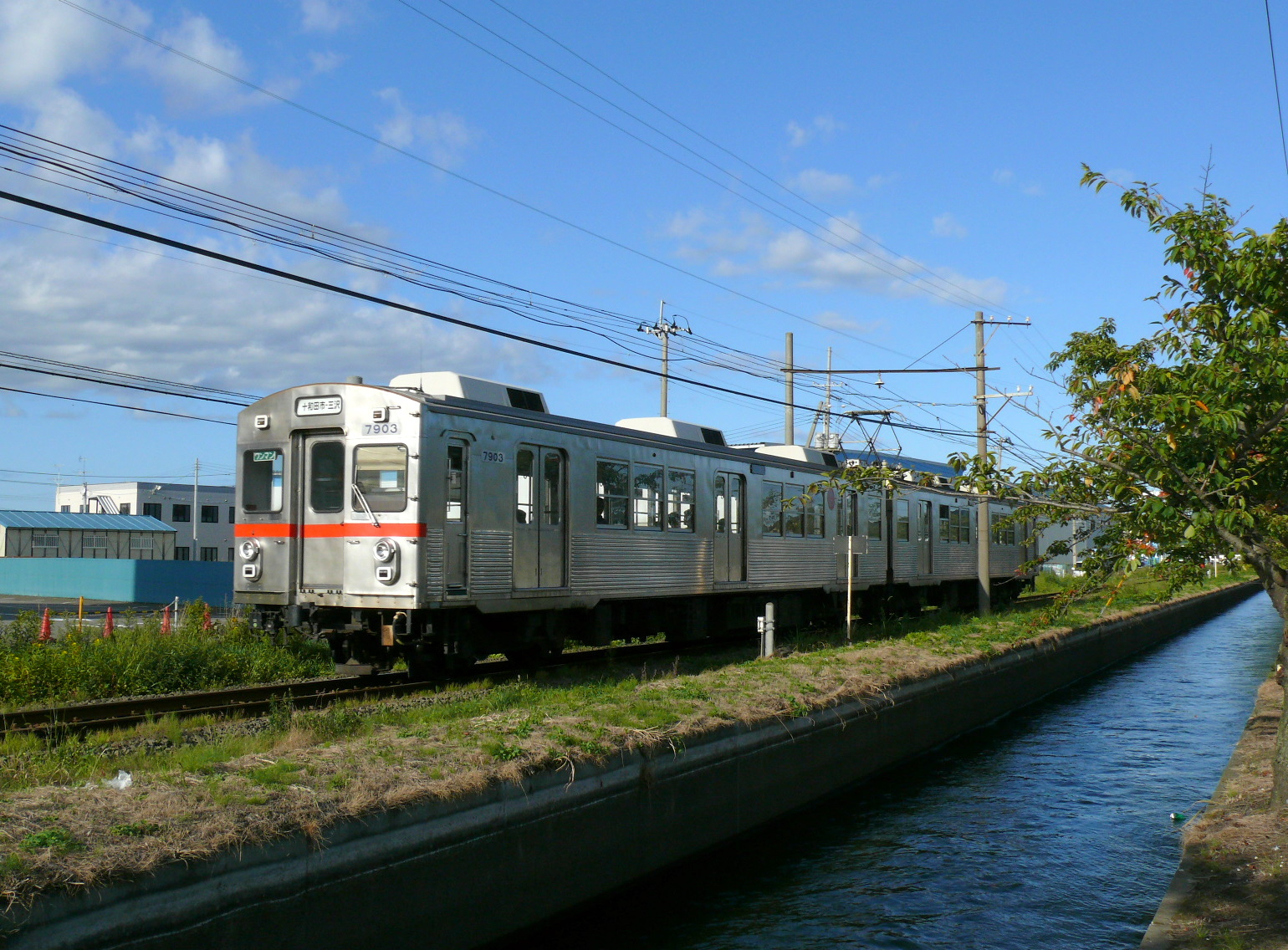
- Near Towadashi Station

Overview
- Owner: Towada Kankō Electric Railway
- Termini: Misawa; Towadashi
- Stations: 11

Service
- Type: Heavy rail Passenger
- Rolling stock: Moha 7200, Moha 7700, Kuha 7900, Moha 3400, Moha 3600

History
- Opened: 1922
- Closed: 2012

Technical
- Line length: 14.7 km (9.1 mi)
- Track gauge: 3 ft 6 in (1,067 mm)
- Electrification: 1500 VDC

The Towada Kankō Electric Railway Line (十和田観光電鉄線, Towada Kankō Dentetsu-sen) was a railway route operated by Towada Kankō Electric Railway (Totetsu). It ran between Misawa Station and Towadashi Station in eastern Aomori Prefecture, Japan.

== History ==
On September 5, 1922, the Towada Railway (十和田鉄道) began operating a 762mm gauge line between Furumaki Station (present day Misawa Station) and Sanbongi Station (present day Towadashi Station, with intermediate stops at Shichihyaku and Takashizu. Additional stations were added in the 1930s. In 1951, the line was fully electrified and the track gauge was expanded to 1,067 mm (3 ft 6 in). The line was renamed as Towada Kankō Electric Railway Line on December 30, 1951. A single direction Automatic Block Signal control system was implemented from December 16, 1971. The Towadashi terminus was rebuilt in 1985 to include a shopping complex. All freight operations on the line were suspended from 1986. A new automatic train stop (ATS) system was implemented from October 1, 2002.

The operation of the line was discontinued on April 1, 2012.

== Station list ==
Station	Japanese	Distance (km)		Transfers	Location	
Station	Japanese	Between Stations	Total	Transfers	Location	
Misawa	三沢	-	0.0	Aoimori Railway Line	Misawa	Aomori
Ōmagari	大曲	2.7	2.7		Rokunohe	Aomori
Yanagisawa	柳沢	2.4	5.1		Rokunohe	Aomori
Shichihyaku	七百	1.3	6.4		Rokunohe	Aomori
Furusato	古里	2.0	8.4		Rokunohe	Aomori
Sannōkō-mae	三農校前	1.5	9.9		Rokunohe	Aomori
Takashizu	高清水	0.7	10.6		Towada	Aomori
Kitasato-Daigaku-mae	北里大学前	2.1	12.7		Towada	Aomori
Kōgyōkōkō-mae	工業高校前	0.6	13.3		Towada	Aomori
Higashino-Danchi	ひがし野団地	0.4	13.7		Towada	Aomori
Towadashi	十和田市	1.0	14.7		Towada	Aomori

== Line data ==
- Length: 14.7 km (9.1 mi)
- Track gauge: 3 ft 6 in (1,067 mm)
- Number of stations: 11 (including termini)
- Electrification: 1500 V DC
- Tracks: single track
- Block Signal: Automatic Block Signal

== Rolling stock used ==
As of April 1, 2003, the company had the following equipment:

- Moha 7200 stock: #7204, 7205
- Moha 7700 stock and Kuha 7900 stock (formerly Tokyu 7700): #7701 + 7901–7903
- Moha 3400 stock: #3401
- Moha 3600 stock: #3603
- ED300: #301
- ED400: #402
- Tora 300: #301, 302
