= Higashino-Danchi Station =

Former railway station in Japan

Coordinates: 40°37′35.76″N 141°13′24.38″E

Higashino Danchi Station ひがし野団地駅
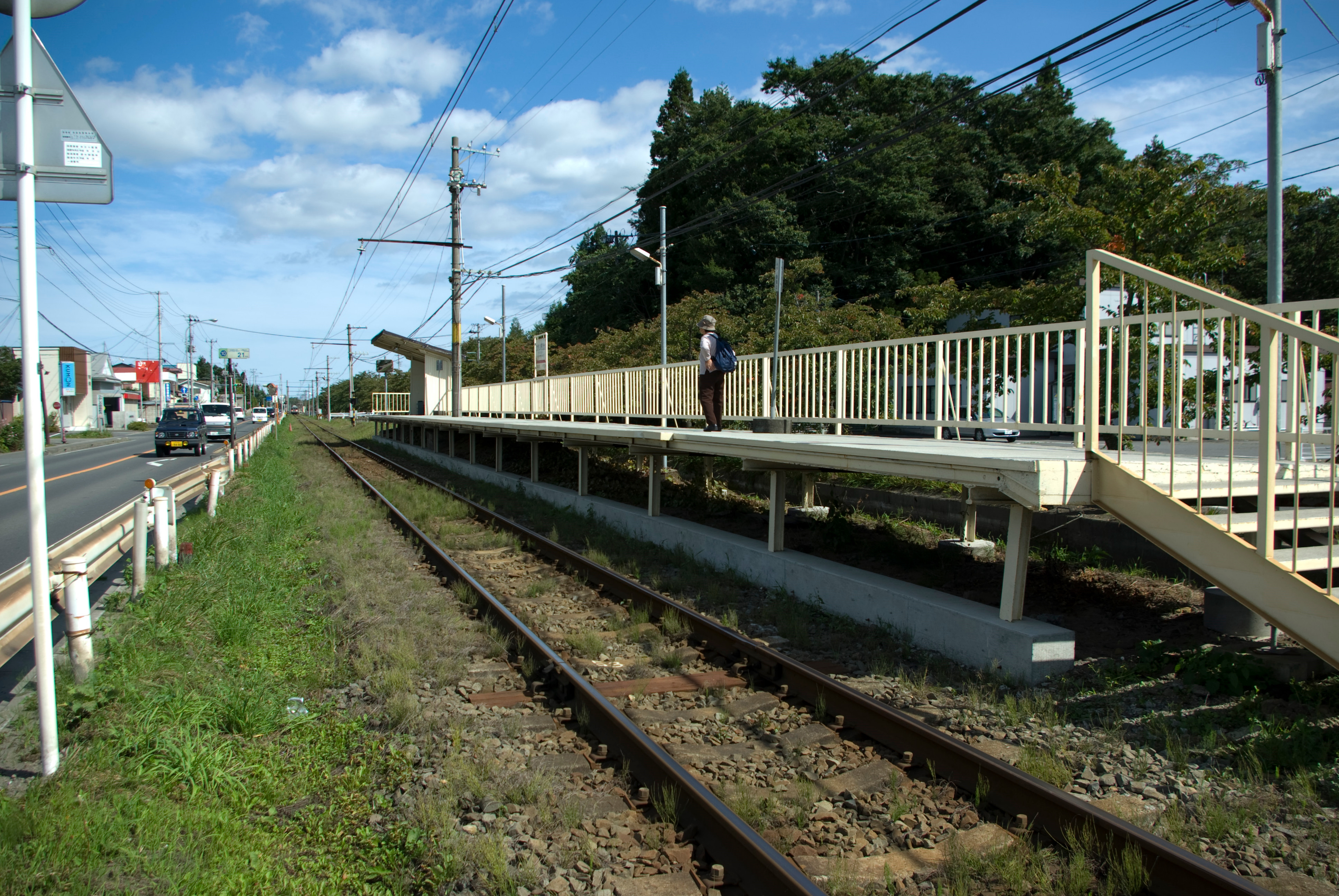

General information
- Location: Sanbongi Shinotaira 60, Towada, Aomori （青森県十和田市大字三本木字下平６０） Japan
- Operator: Towada Kankō Electric Railway
- Line: Towada Kankō Electric Railway Line

History
- Opened: 1932
- Closed: 2012
- Former names: Shibusawa Nōjō-mae (until 1972)
Location

Higashino Danchi Station (ひがし野団地駅, Higashino Danchi-eki) was a railway station on the Towada Kankō Electric Railway Line located in the city of Towada, Aomori Prefecture, Japan. It was 13.7 rail kilometers from the terminus of the Towada Kankō Electric Railway Line at Misawa Station.

== History ==
Higashino Danchi Station was opened on October 18, 1932 as the Shibusawa Nōjō-mae Station (渋沢農場前駅). It was renamed to its present name on August 15, 1972.

The station was closed when the Towada Kankō Electric Railway Line was discontinued on April 1, 2012.

== Lines ==
- Towada Kankō Electric Railway
  - Towada Kankō Electric Railway Line

== Station layout ==
Higashino Danchi Station had a single side platform serving bidirectional traffic. There was a small weather shelter on the platform, but no station building.

=== Platforms ===
1	■Towada Kankō Electric Railway Line	for Misawa for Towadashi

== Adjacent stations ==
←	Service	→
Kōgyōkōkō-mae	Towada Kankō Electric Railway Line	Towadashi

== See also ==
- List of railway stations in Japan
