= Takashizu Station =

Former railway station in Japan

Coordinates: 40°38′5.96″N 141°15′32.60″E

Takashizu Station 高清水駅
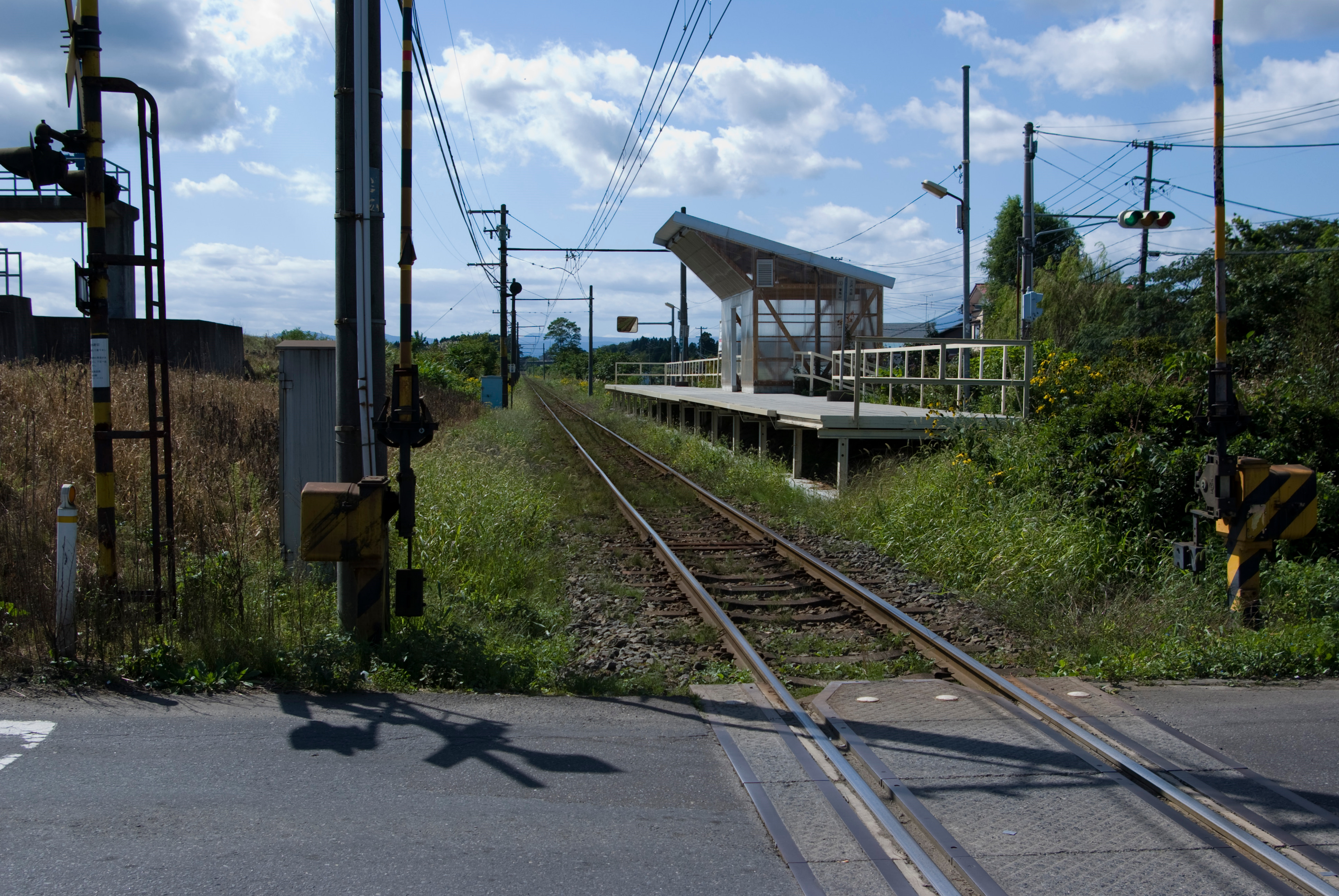

General information
- Location: Aisaka Takashizu 77-3, Towada, Aomori （青森県十和田市大字相坂字高清水７７－３） Japan
- Operator: Towada Kankō Electric Railway
- Line: Towada Kankō Electric Railway Line

History
- Opened: 1922
- Closed: 2012
Location

Takashizu Station (高清水駅, Takashizu-eki) was a railway station on the Towada Kankō Electric Railway Line located in the city of Towada, Aomori Prefecture, Japan. It was 10.6 rail kilometers from the terminus of the Towada Kankō Electric Railway Line at Misawa Station.

== History ==
Takashizu Station was opened on September 5, 1922.

The station was closed when the Towada Kankō Electric Railway Line was discontinued on April 1, 2012.

== Lines ==
- Towada Kankō Electric Railway
  - Towada Kankō Electric Railway Line

== Station layout ==
Takashizu Station had a single side platforms serving bidirectional traffic. There was a small weather shelter on the platform, but no station building.

=== Platforms ===
1	■Towada Kankō Electric Railway Line	for Misawa for Kitasato Daigaku-mae, Towadashi

== Adjacent stations ==
←	Service	→
Sannōkō-mae	Towada Kankō Electric Railway Line	Kitasato Daigaku-mae

== See also ==
- List of railway stations in Japan
