= Kitasato =

Kitasato may refer to

- Kitasato Shibasaburō (1853–1931), Japanese physician
- Kitasato University in Tokyo, Japan named after Kitasato
- Kitasato-Daigaku-mae Station in Towada, Aomori Prefecture, Japan
