= Ōmagari Station =

Ōmagari Station may refer to several train stations in Japan:

- Ōmagari Station (Akita)
- Ōmagari Station (Aomori)
- Ōmagari Station (Hokkaido), a former station on the Shinmei Line
