= Rokunohe =

Rokunohe 六戸町
- Town
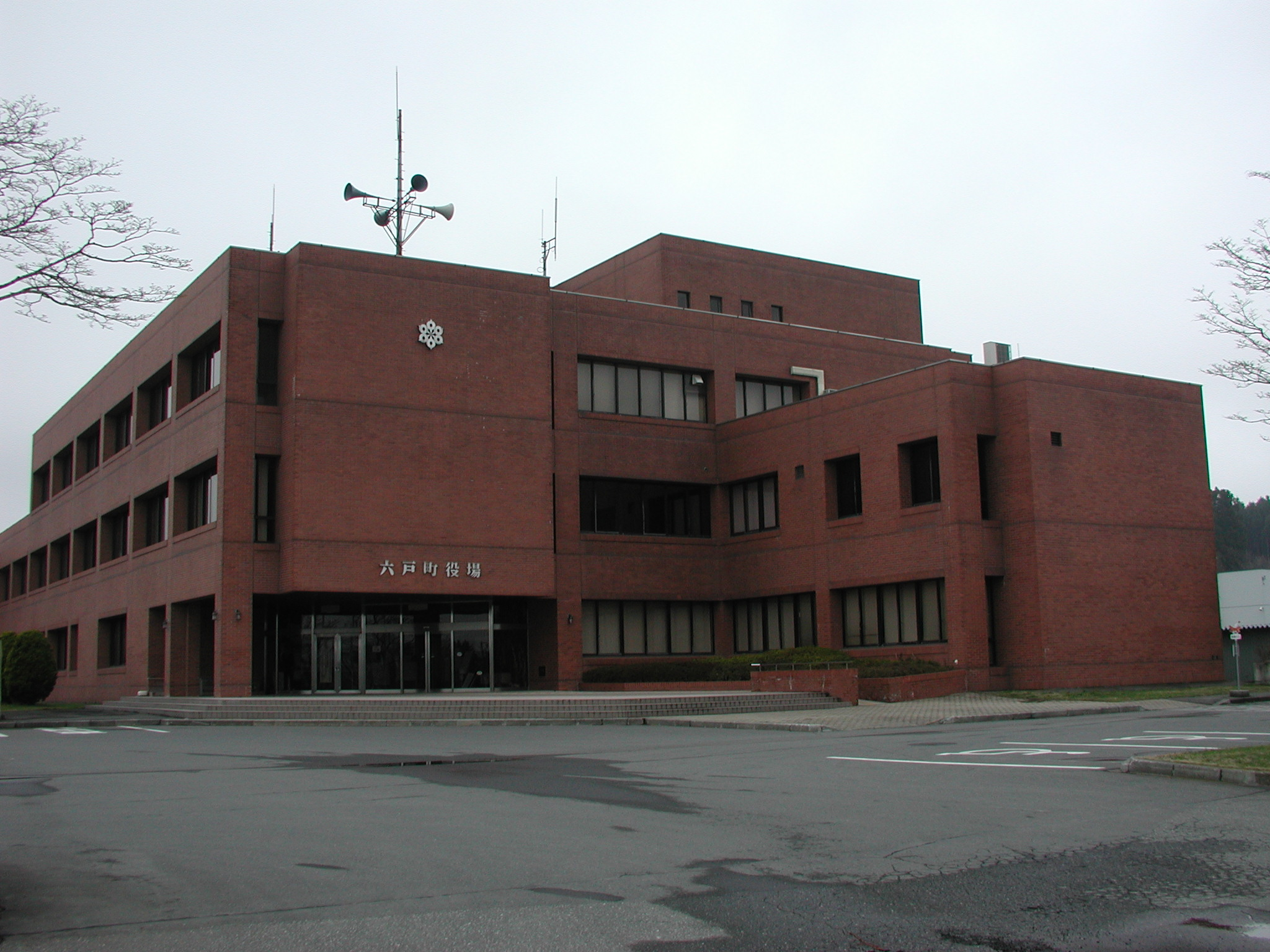
- Rokunohe Town Office

- Flag Seal
- Location of Rokunohe in Aomori Prefecture

- Coordinates: 40°36′34″N 141°19′29″E
- Country: Japan
- Region: Tōhoku
- Prefecture: Aomori
- District: Kamikita

Area
  - Total: 83.89 km^{2} (32.39 sq mi)

Population (November 30, 2025)
  - Total: 10,439
  - Density: 124.4/km^{2} (322.3/sq mi)
- Time zone: UTC+9 (Japan Standard Time)
- Phone number: 0176-55-3111
- Address: Inuotose, Rokunohe-machi, Kitakami-gun, Aomori-ken 039-2932
- Website: Official website
- Symbols
- Bird: Lark
- Flower: Mountain cherry
- Tree: Maple

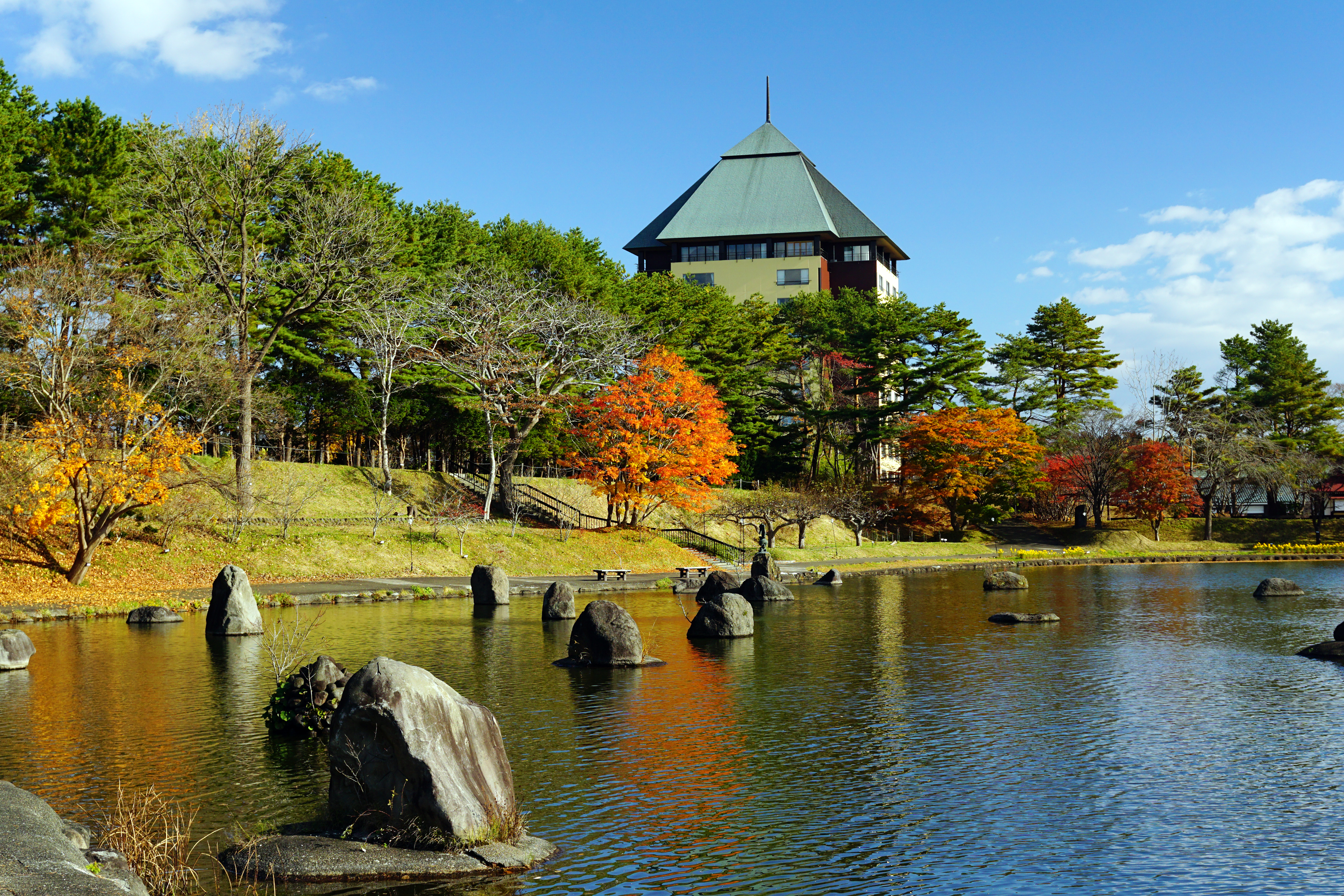
Komaki Onsen

Rokunohe (六戸町, Rokunohe-machi) is a town located in Aomori Prefecture, Japan. As of 30 November 2025, the town had an estimated population of 10,439 in 4738 households, and a population density of 124 persons per km^{2}. The total area of the town is 83.89 square kilometres (32.39 sq mi)

== Geography ==
Rokunohe is in east-central Aomori Prefecture, in relatively flat lands. The Oirase River, which originates from Lake Towada, flows through the southern part of the town from east to west. The central and northern part is a plateau called Sanbonkibara, and the Inogawa (Sanbonkibara irrigation canal), which branches off from the Oirase River at Towada City, flows eastward.

=== Neighboring municipalities ===
Aomori Prefecture

- Gonohe
- Misawa
- Oirase
- Tōhoku
- Towada

=== Climate ===
The town has a humid climate characterized by cool short summers and long cold winters with heavy snowfall (Köppen climate classification Cfa). The average annual temperature in Rokunohe is 9.7 °C. The average annual rainfall is 1201 mm with September as the wettest month. The temperatures are highest on average in August, at around 22.6 °C, and lowest in January, at around -2.2 °C.

== Demographics ==
Per Japanese census data, the population of Rokunohe has remained relatively stable over the past 50 years.

Historical population
Year	Pop.	±% p.a.
1950	9,911	—
1960	11,281	+1.30%
1970	10,193	−1.01%
1980	10,532	+0.33%
1990	10,615	+0.08%
2000	10,481	−0.13%
2010	10,242	−0.23%
2020	10,447	+0.20%

== History ==
Rokunohe began as one of a series of fortified settlements established by the Nanbu clan in the early Kamakura period to control their new territories in Nukada District of northern Ōshū, although the area never developed into an independent village. During the Edo period, the area was controlled by Morioka Domain, becoming part of the territory assigned to Shichinohe Domain in the later half of the Edo period. During the post-Meiji restoration establishment of the modern municipalities system on 1 April 1889, Rokunohe Village was proclaimed from the merger of seven small hamlets. On February 1, 1948, a portion of Rokunohe was merged into neighbouring Misawa. The remaining portion of Rokunohe was elevated to town status on October 1, 1957.

== Government ==
Rokunohe has a mayor-council form of government with a directly elected mayor and a unicameral town council of 12 members. Rokunohe is part of Kamikita District which contributes four members to the Aomori Prefectural Assembly. In terms of national politics, the town is part of Aomori 2nd district of the lower house of the Diet of Japan.

== Economy ==
The economy of Rokunohe is heavily dependent on agriculture and stockraising. Primary crops include rice, Japanese yam, carrots and garlic.

== Education ==
Rokunohe has three public elementary schools and two public middle schools operated by the town government. The town has one public high school operated by the Aomori Prefectural Board of Education.

== Transportation ==
=== Railway ===
The Towada Kankō Electric Railway Line, which had the following five stations in the town, was discontinued in 2012. Since that time, Rokunohe has not had any passenger railway service.

- Ōmagari - Yanagisawa - Shichihyaku - Furusato - Sannōkō-mae.

=== Highway ===
- Kamikita Expressway
- Second Michinoku Toll Road
- National Route 4
- National Route 45

== Local attractions ==
- Komaki onsen
- Kumano Jinja (claims to have been founded in 844 AD)

== Noted people from Rokunohe ==
- Tatsuya Araidai – professional karate athlete
