= Towada Art Center =

- 十和田市現代美術館
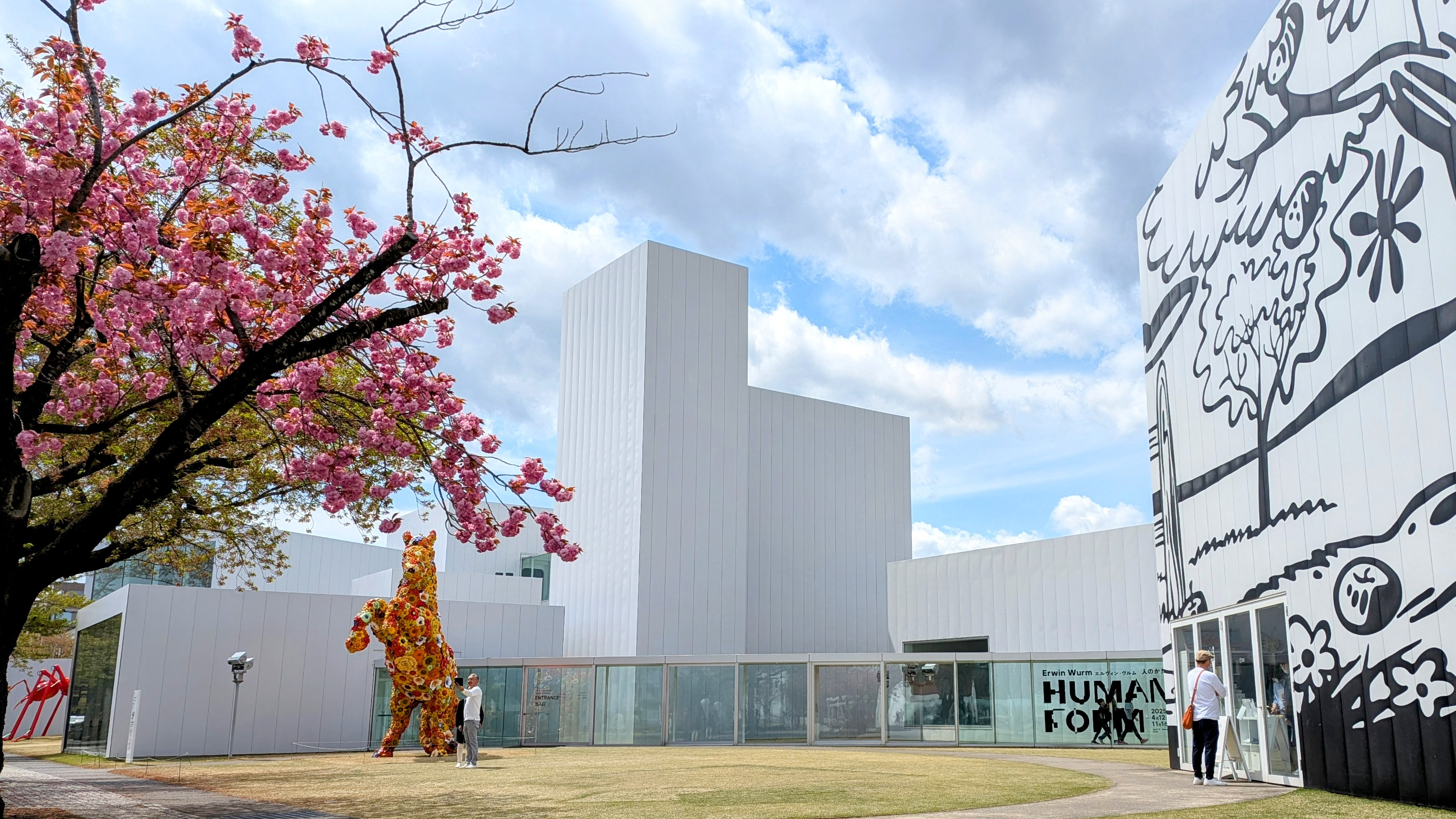
- Towada Art Center（2025）
- Established: 26 April 2008
- Location: 10-9 Nishiniban-cho, Towada-shi, Aomori-ken Japan
- Coordinates: 40.614°N 141.209°E
- Type: Art museum
- Website: Official website

The Towada Art Center (十和田市現代美術館, Towada-shi Gendai Bijutsukan) is an art museum in Towada, Aomori Prefecture, Japan.

The museum was opened in 2008 as part of the Arts Towada Project, in an effort to revitalize the city. It features works from artists both inside and outside of Japan, including Yoko Ono, Yoshitomo Nara, and Jeong-Hwa Choi.

== Publications ==
The museum has published a number of books about its collection and special exhibitions, including the following:

- Becoming Feral (2024)
- Yu Araki: Lonely Planets (2023)
- Liu Jianhua: Fluid Voids (2023)
- Momose Aya: Interpreter (2022)
- Towada Art Centre: Architecture (2020)
- Towada Art Centre: Art (2020)
