= Matsumi Falls =

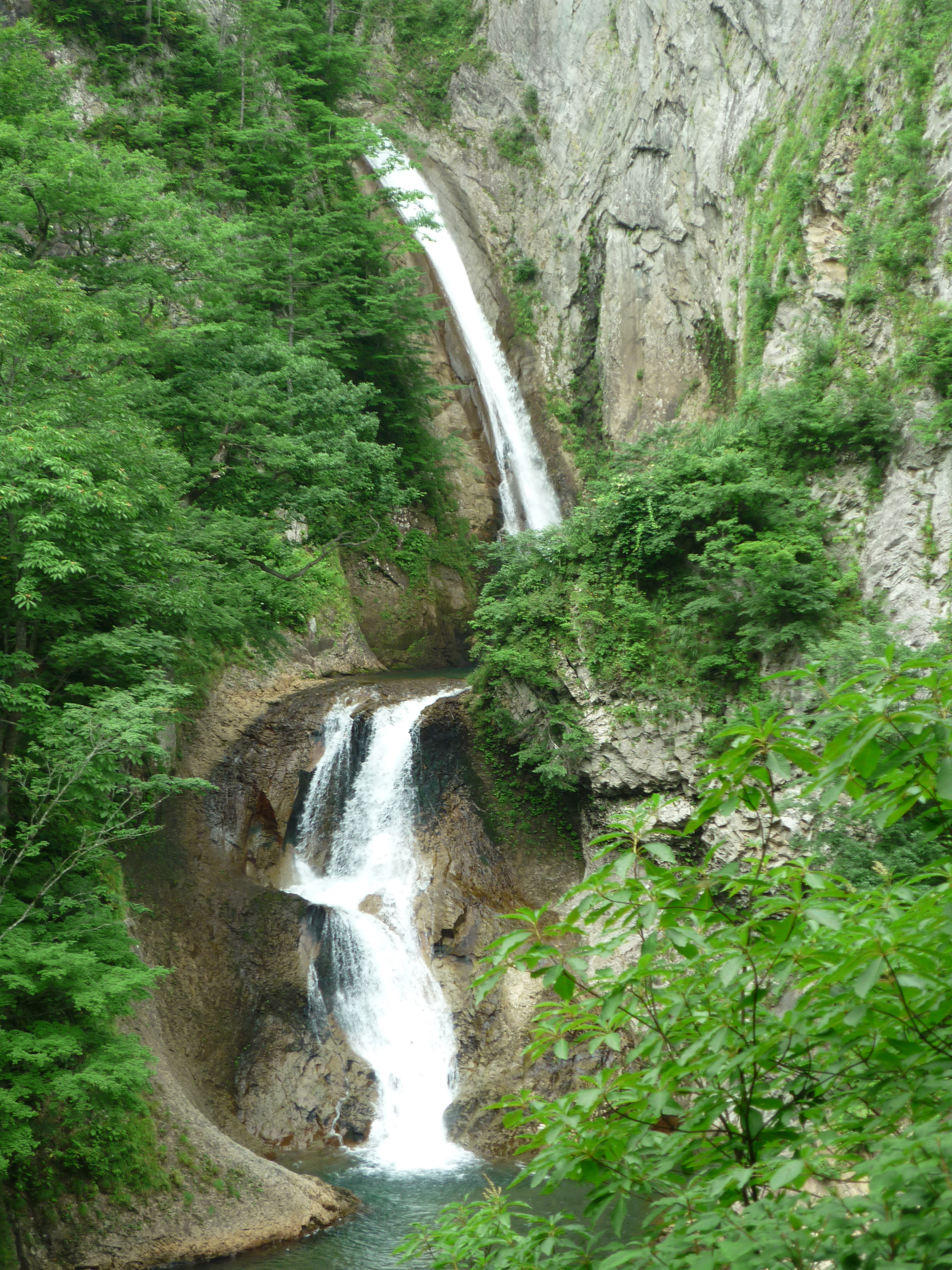

- Location within Japan
- Location: Towada, Aomori Prefecture, Japan
- Coordinates: 40°33′30″N 140°54′23″E
- Type: Chute, plunge
- Total height: 90 m (300 ft)
- Watercourse: Oirase River

Matsumi Falls (松見の滝, Matsumi-no-taki) is a waterfall in the city of Towada, Aomori Prefecture, Japan, on a tributary of the Oirase River, which flows down from Lake Towada. It is one of "Japan’s Top 100 Waterfalls", in a listing published by the Japanese Ministry of the Environment in 1990.

== See also ==
- List of waterfalls
- List of waterfalls in Japan
