= Towada =

Towada 十和田市
- City
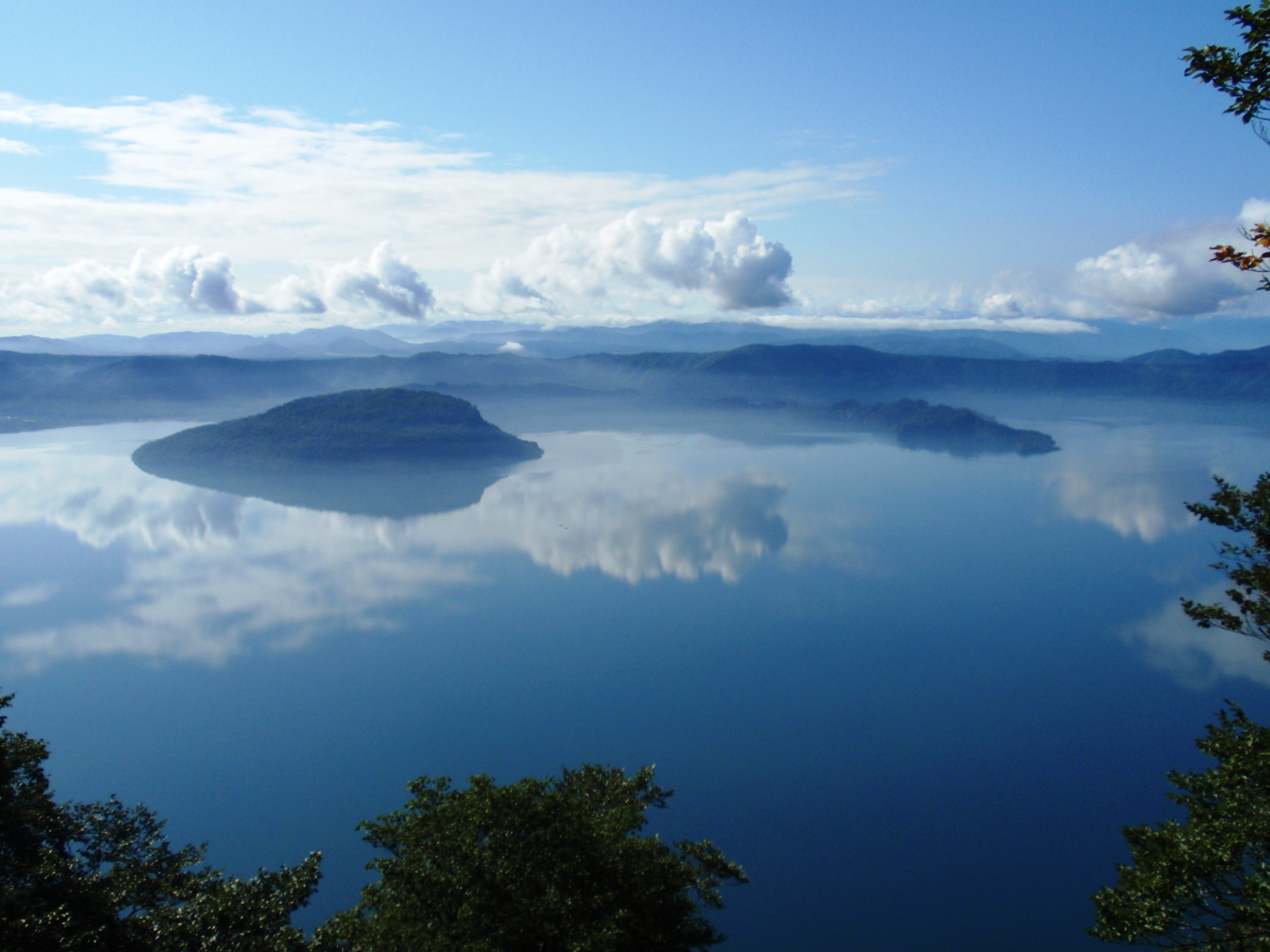
- Lake Towada from the Ohanabeyama Observatory

- Flag Seal
- Location of Towada in Aomori Prefecture

- Location in Japan
- Coordinates: 40°36′46″N 141°12′21″E
- Country: Japan
- Region: Tōhoku
- Prefecture: Aomori

Government
  - Mayor: Yuriko Sakurada (since January 2025)

Area
  - Total: 725.65 km^{2} (280.18 sq mi)

Population (October 31, 2025)
  - Total: 56,766
  - Density: 78.228/km^{2} (202.61/sq mi)
- Time zone: UTC+9 (Japan Standard Time)
- Phone number: 0176-23-5111
- Address: 6-1 Nishi Jūniban-chō, Towada-shi, Aomori-ken 034-8615
- Climate: Cfa/Dfa
- Website: Official website
- Symbols
- Flower: Sakura
- Tree: Maple

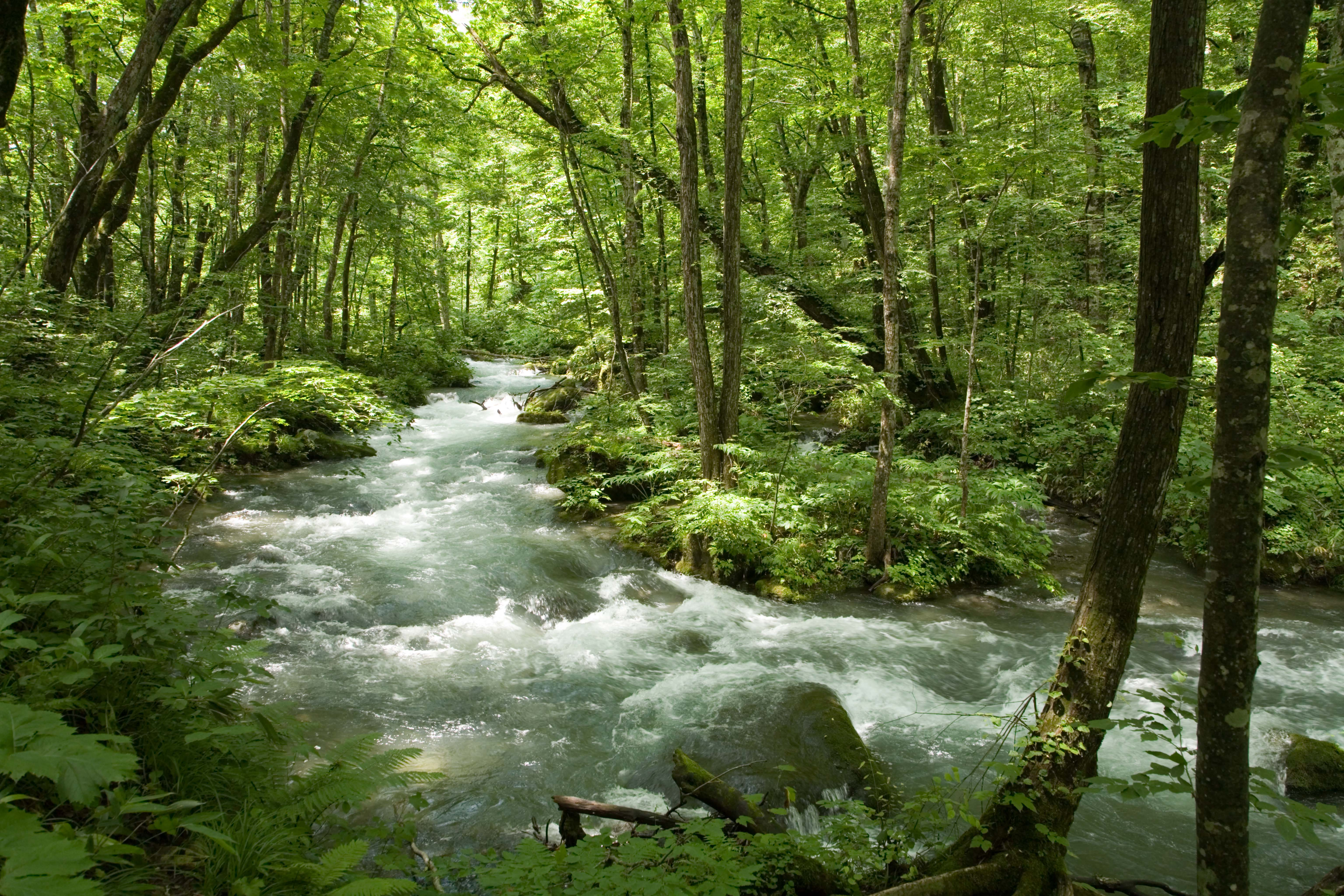
Oirase River

Towada (十和田市, Towada-shi) is a city in Aomori Prefecture, Japan. As of 31 October 2025, the city had an estimated population of 56,766 in 28222 households, and a population density of 78 persons per km^{2} The total area of the city is 725.65 square kilometers (280.18 sq mi).Towada is home to the national and prefectural agencies that administer the Kamikita region, and is the central city of the region. In October 2012, the city signed an agreement with nine surrounding municipalities to improve the living environment, and has a cooperative relationship with Misawa City, which has an airport and a U.S. Air Force base.

== Geography ==
Towada is in the foothills of the Hakkōda Mountains and encompasses the Aomori portion of Lake Towada. The Oirase River passes through the town. Towada is an area rich in nature. To the west are Towada-Hachimantai National Park. In particular, Lake Towada and the Oirase River are famous tourist spots. As for industry, agriculture is thriving, and the city produces the largest amount of garlic in Japan.

More than half of the population of about 60,000 lives in the eastern urban area (Sanbongi area), with the central part of the city is characterized by its orderly grid-like streets. In particular, "Government Office Street" is a popular place for citizens to enjoy the Someiyoshino (Japanese cherry) trees planted along the street. In recent years, the city has been promoting its urban policy as a "Arts Towada," with the Towada Art Center (Art museum) as its centerpiece. The rest of the population is scattered in hamlets along the Oirase River and in the hilly western areas of the city.

The northwestern part of the city is at the foot of Mount Hakkōda, and has numerous hot springs, The southwestern part of the city is also mountainous, and contains Lake Towada, which is a caldera lake, and Mount Ohanabe and Mount Towada, which are the outer rims. The Oirase River, the only outlet from Lake Towada, flows northeast from Nenokuchi on the east bank of Lake Towada. Water from the foot of Mount Hakkoda, which is located about 20 kilometers north, also flows into the Oirase River. About 14 kilometers from Nenokuchi to Mount Yakeyama in Oirase River is called the Oirase Gorge.

=== Neighboring municipalities ===
Akita Prefecture

- Kazuno
- Kosaka

Aomori Prefecture

- Aomori
- Gonohe
- Hirakawa
- Rokunohe
- Shichinohe
- Shingō
- Tōhoku

== Climate ==
The city has a cold humid climate characterized by cool summers and cold winters with heavy snowfall (Köppen climate classification Cfa). The average annual temperature in Towada is 9.8 °C. The average annual rainfall is 1233 mm with September as the wettest month. The temperatures are highest on average in August, at around 22.8 °C, and lowest in January, at around -2.3 °C. Part of the city is within the limits of the Towada-Hachimantai National Park.

Climate data for Towada (elevation 55 m, 1991–2020 normals, extremes 1976–present)
Month	Jan	Feb	Mar	Apr	May	Jun	Jul	Aug	Sep	Oct	Nov	Dec	Year
Record high °C (°F)	14.2 (57.6)	16.5 (61.7)	22.8 (73.0)	28.0 (82.4)	33.2 (91.8)	33.8 (92.8)	35.8 (96.4)	35.6 (96.1)	35.1 (95.2)	27.8 (82.0)	24.3 (75.7)	19.3 (66.7)	35.8 (96.4)
Mean daily maximum °C (°F)	1.9 (35.4)	2.7 (36.9)	6.9 (44.4)	13.7 (56.7)	19.0 (66.2)	21.7 (71.1)	25.1 (77.2)	26.7 (80.1)	23.6 (74.5)	18.0 (64.4)	11.3 (52.3)	4.6 (40.3)	14.6 (58.3)
Daily mean °C (°F)	−1.7 (28.9)	−1.3 (29.7)	2.2 (36.0)	8.0 (46.4)	13.4 (56.1)	16.8 (62.2)	20.6 (69.1)	22.1 (71.8)	18.5 (65.3)	12.3 (54.1)	6.3 (43.3)	0.6 (33.1)	9.8 (49.6)
Mean daily minimum °C (°F)	−6.2 (20.8)	−6.2 (20.8)	−2.6 (27.3)	2.1 (35.8)	7.9 (46.2)	12.5 (54.5)	17.1 (62.8)	18.3 (64.9)	13.9 (57.0)	6.8 (44.2)	1.2 (34.2)	−3.5 (25.7)	5.1 (41.2)
Record low °C (°F)	−20.1 (−4.2)	−19.7 (−3.5)	−16.7 (1.9)	−9.8 (14.4)	−2.5 (27.5)	1.2 (34.2)	6.9 (44.4)	8.8 (47.8)	3.6 (38.5)	−1.5 (29.3)	−8.7 (16.3)	−15.3 (4.5)	−20.1 (−4.2)
Average precipitation mm (inches)	37.8 (1.49)	35.2 (1.39)	50.5 (1.99)	59.7 (2.35)	80.5 (3.17)	94.3 (3.71)	146.0 (5.75)	159.8 (6.29)	159.9 (6.30)	108.8 (4.28)	58.6 (2.31)	51.2 (2.02)	1,031.1 (40.59)
Average snowfall cm (inches)	125 (49)	116 (46)	73 (29)	3 (1.2)	0 (0)	0 (0)	0 (0)	0 (0)	0 (0)	0 (0)	10 (3.9)	72 (28)	395 (156)
Average precipitation days (≥ 1.0 mm)	7.8	7.9	7.9	8.5	9.6	9.2	11.1	11.3	10.5	9.0	9.6	8.9	110.6
Mean monthly sunshine hours	115.4	121.4	168.7	186.7	197.8	158.3	132.8	149.3	140.6	150.6	128.8	109.9	1,755.1
Source: Japan Meteorological Agency (1991–2020 normals, extremes 1976–present)

Climate data for Yasumiya, Towada (elevation 414 m, 1991–2020 normals, extremes 1982–present)
Month	Jan	Feb	Mar	Apr	May	Jun	Jul	Aug	Sep	Oct	Nov	Dec	Year
Record high °C (°F)	9.1 (48.4)	14.7 (58.5)	16.8 (62.2)	27.3 (81.1)	30.0 (86.0)	30.6 (87.1)	32.5 (90.5)	33.7 (92.7)	31.4 (88.5)	25.4 (77.7)	21.0 (69.8)	14.5 (58.1)	33.7 (92.7)
Mean daily maximum °C (°F)	−1.2 (29.8)	−0.4 (31.3)	3.2 (37.8)	10.0 (50.0)	16.6 (61.9)	20.3 (68.5)	23.6 (74.5)	25.1 (77.2)	21.3 (70.3)	15.1 (59.2)	8.2 (46.8)	1.5 (34.7)	12.0 (53.6)
Daily mean °C (°F)	−3.7 (25.3)	−3.3 (26.1)	−0.3 (31.5)	5.2 (41.4)	11.2 (52.2)	15.5 (59.9)	19.7 (67.5)	20.9 (69.6)	17.0 (62.6)	10.7 (51.3)	4.5 (40.1)	−1.2 (29.8)	8.0 (46.4)
Mean daily minimum °C (°F)	−6.7 (19.9)	−6.6 (20.1)	−3.9 (25.0)	0.9 (33.6)	6.4 (43.5)	11.4 (52.5)	16.5 (61.7)	17.6 (63.7)	13.1 (55.6)	6.5 (43.7)	0.9 (33.6)	−4.2 (24.4)	4.3 (39.7)
Record low °C (°F)	−16.4 (2.5)	−14.9 (5.2)	−14.8 (5.4)	−10.1 (13.8)	−1.6 (29.1)	0.4 (32.7)	7.3 (45.1)	7.9 (46.2)	3.2 (37.8)	−1.2 (29.8)	−8.5 (16.7)	−13.4 (7.9)	−16.4 (2.5)
Average precipitation mm (inches)	66.1 (2.60)	68.8 (2.71)	92.7 (3.65)	108.1 (4.26)	118.1 (4.65)	121.5 (4.78)	211.7 (8.33)	220.2 (8.67)	177.7 (7.00)	152.5 (6.00)	127.5 (5.02)	94.8 (3.73)	1,559.5 (61.40)
Average precipitation days (≥ 1.0 mm)	13.5	13.3	14.9	13.1	11.7	10.6	12.9	12.2	12.6	13.9	14.2	13.7	156.6
Mean monthly sunshine hours	49.2	67.5	115.7	163.0	190.3	159.2	125.6	146.3	134.3	131.8	88.9	51.4	1,423
Source: Japan Meteorological Agency (1991–2020 normals, extremes 1982–present)

== Demographics ==
Per Japanese census data, the population of Towada peaked at around the year 2000, and has been in decline since.

Historical population

Year	Pop.	±% p.a.
1920	25,840	—
1930	31,896	+2.13%
1940	39,767	+2.23%
1950	49,125	+2.14%
1960	56,232	+1.36%
1970	59,719	+0.60%

Year	Pop.	±% p.a.
1980	67,050	+1.16%
1990	68,097	+0.16%
2000	69,630	+0.22%
2010	66,123	−0.52%
2020	60,378	−0.90%

== History ==
The area around present-day Towada was formerly a wasteland known as Sanbongihara (三本木原), which became the location of a colonization and land reclamation project initiated by the Nambu clan of Morioka Domain from 1855. The project was headed by Nitobe Tsutō, the grandfather of Inazō Nitobe. The project was continued by the Meiji government, and the area was designated a ranch area for breeding cavalry horses by the Imperial Japanese Army in 1885. The inclement climate of the area was considered ideal for breeding horses that would be suitable for use in the cold climate areas of Manchuria and Siberia. The village of Sanbongi was established with the establishment of the modern municipalities system on April 1, 1889. On September 1, 1910, Sanbongi was designated a town. It was elevated to the status of a city on February 1, 1955. In October 1956, it changed its name to "Towada".

On January 1, 2005, the town of Towadako (from Kamikita District) was merged into Towada.

== Government ==
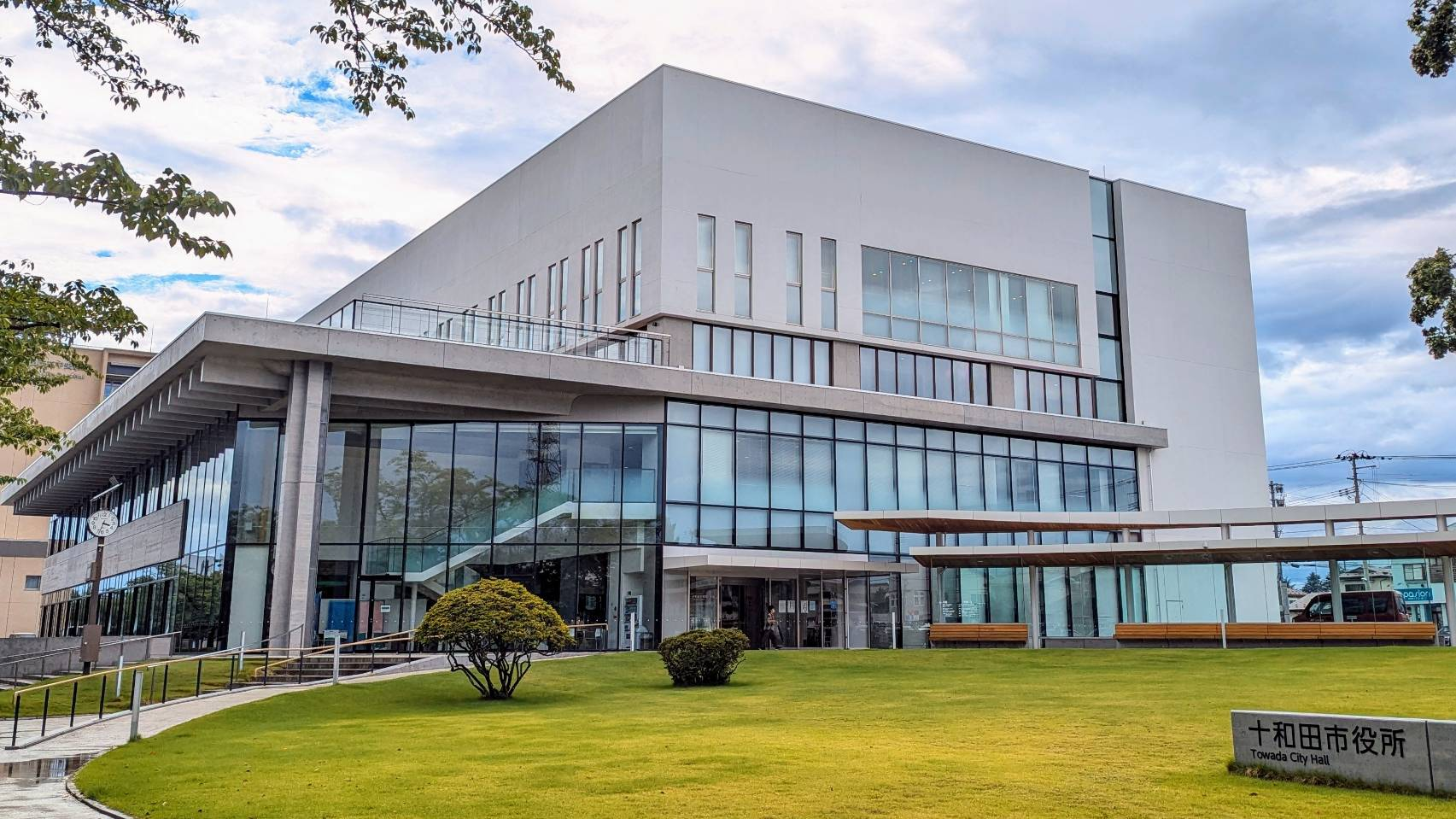
Towada City Hall

Towada has a mayor-council form of government with a directly elected mayor and a unicameral city legislature of 22 members. Towada contributes two members to the Aomori Prefectural Assembly. In terms of national politics, the town is part of Aomori 2nd district of the lower house of the Diet of Japan.

== Economy ==
The economy of Towada is based largely on agriculture.

== Education ==
=== Colleges and universities ===
- Kitasato University - Towada Campus (School of Veterinary Medicine)

=== High schools ===
Towada has three public high schools operated by the Aomori Prefectural Board of Education.

- Sanbongi Agriculture High School
- Sanbongi High School
- Towada Technical High School

=== Elementary schools and middle schools ===
There are 15 public elementary schools and nine public middle schools in Towada operated by the municipal government, and one middle school operated by the prefectural government.

== Transportation ==
=== Railway ===
Towada currently has no passenger railway service. The Towada Kankō Electric Railway Line connecting Towada with Misawa had five stations within the city. It was discontinued in 2012 and replaced by a bus service.

- < Towadashi, Higashino-Danchi, Kōgyōkōkō-mae, Kitasato Daigaku-mae, Takashizu >

=== Highway ===
- Kamikita Expressway
- National Route 4
- National Route 45
- National Route 102
- National Route 103
- National Route 394

== Local attractions ==
- Lake Towada
- Matsumi Falls - one of "Japan’s Top 100 Waterfalls"
- Oirase River - listed as one of the 100 Soundscapes of Japan by the Japanese Ministry of the Environment
- Towada Art Center
- Towada-Hachimantai National Park
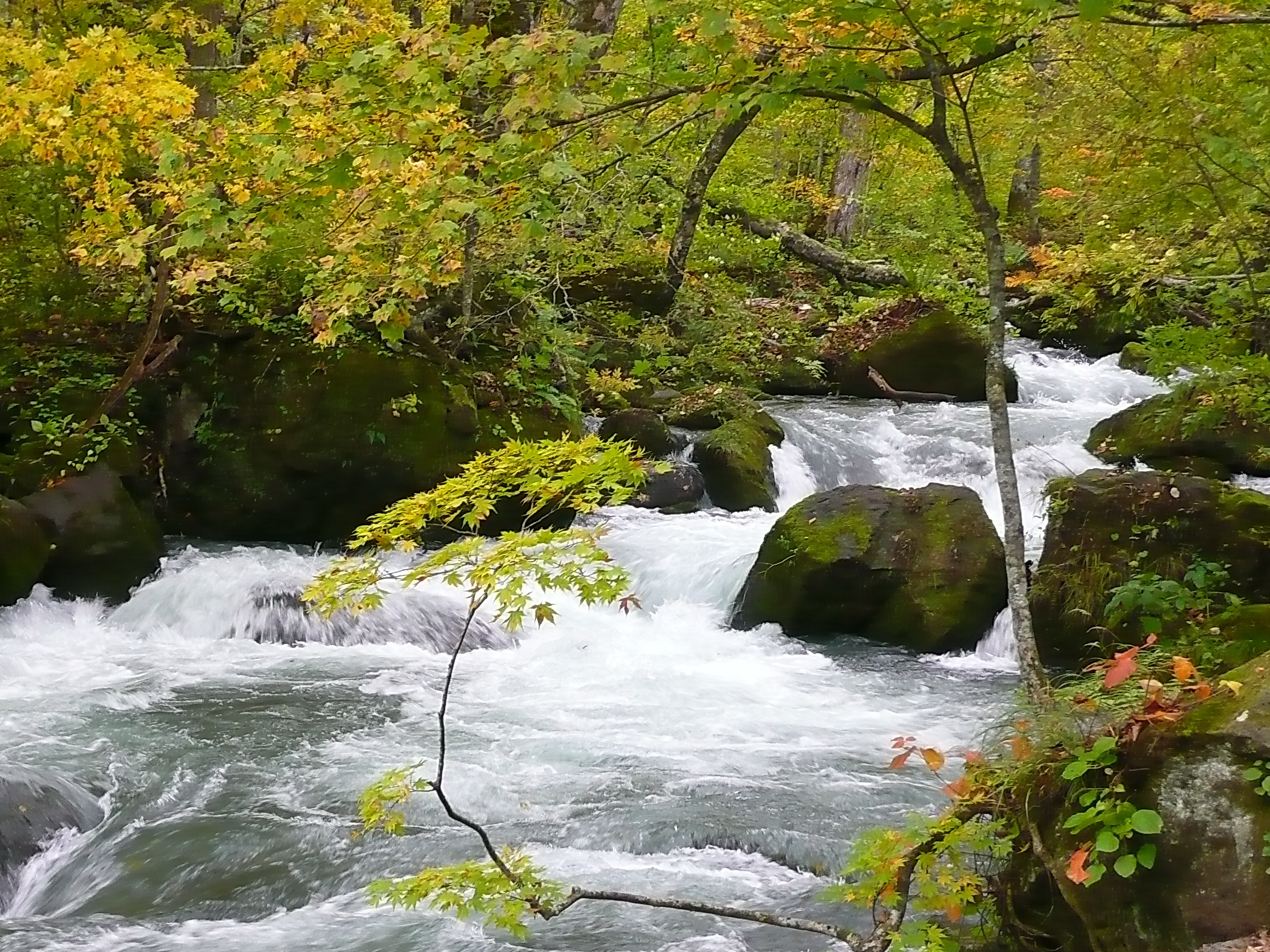
奧入瀨川 Oirase River

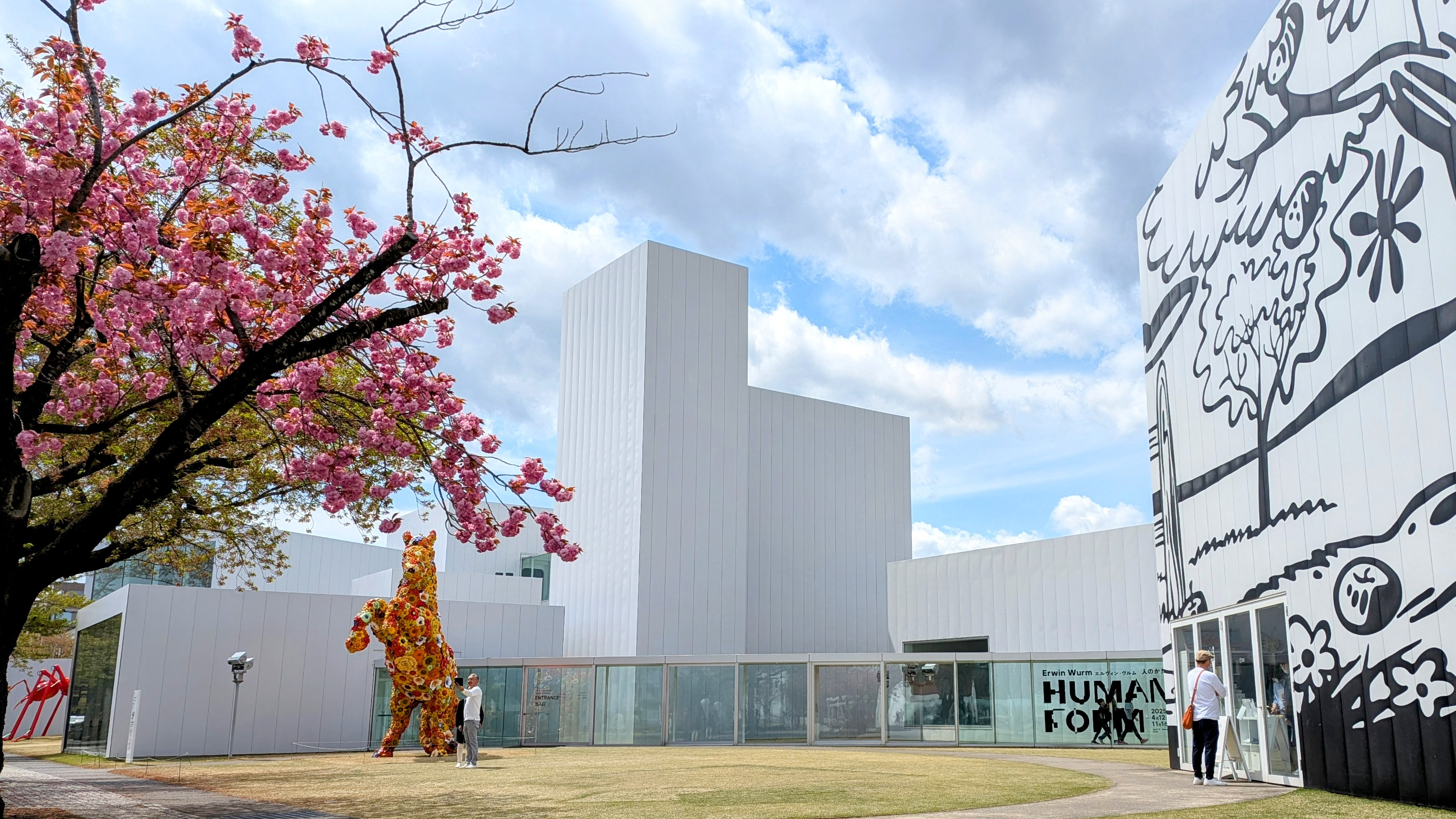
Towada Art Centr

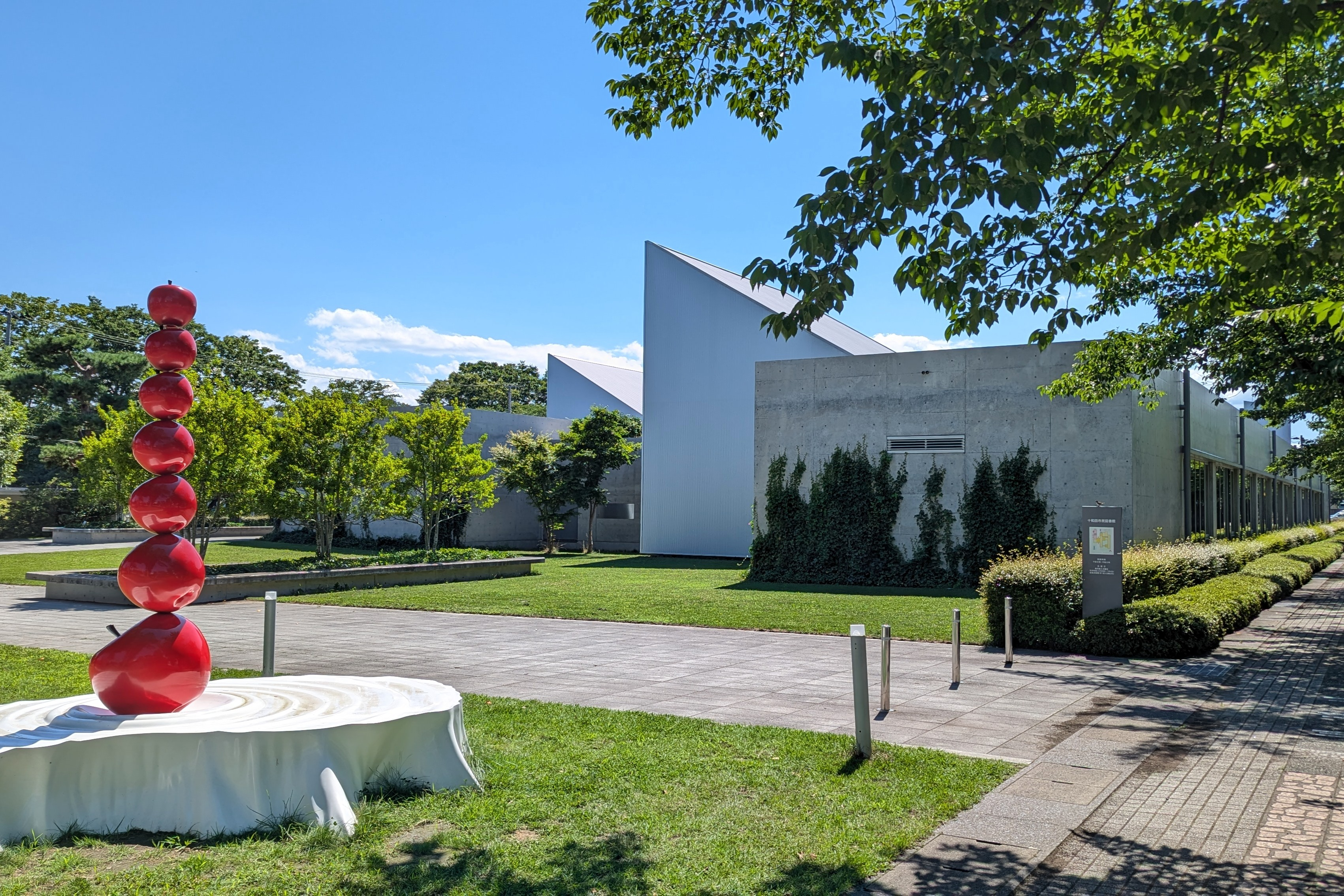
Towada Public Library

== International relations ==
- Canada - Lethbridge, Alberta, Canada, sister city since 2002

== Notable people from Towada ==
- Junji Ishiwatari, musician, and former guitarist and songwriter for the Japanese rock band Supercar
- Koji Kumagai, soccer player
- Koji Nakamura, musician, and former guitarist and lead singer for the Japanese rock band Supercar
