= Towadashi Station =

Former railway station in Japan

Coordinates: 40°37′25.25″N 141°12′50.09″E

Towadashi Station 十和田市駅
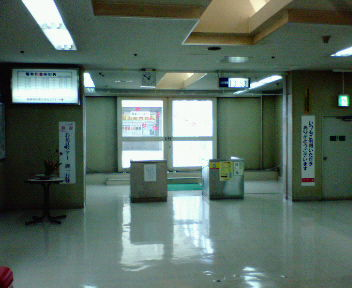
- Towadashi Station

General information
- Location: Higashi Ichiban-cho 7-27, Towada, Aomori （青森県十和田市東一番町7-27） Japan
- Operator: Towada Kankō Electric Railway
- Line: Towada Kankō Electric Railway Line
- Connections: Bus stop

History
- Opened: 1932
- Closed: 2012
- Former names: Sanbongi (until 1969)
Location

Towadashi Station (十和田市駅, Towadashi-eki) was a terminal railway station on the Towada Kankō Electric Railway Line located in the city of Towada, Aomori Prefecture, Japan. It was 13.7 rail kilometers from the opposite terminus of the Towada Kankō Electric Railway Line at Misawa Station.

== History ==
Towadashi Station was opened on September 5, 1922 as the Sanbongi Station (三本木駅). It was renamed to its present name on May 15, 1969. The station was completely rebuilt on October 28, 1985 with the new station incorporating the headquarters of the Towada Kankō Electric Railway, and the former station used for freight operations only. However, the line discontinued its freight operations in 1986 and the old station was demolished in 2005. In March 2007, a new terminal building, including a bank, post office, real estate office and supermarket was inaugurated.

The station was closed when the Towada Kankō Electric Railway Line was discontinued on April 1, 2012.

== Lines ==
- Towada Kankō Electric Railway
  - Towada Kankō Electric Railway Line

== Station layout ==
Towadashi Station had one platform serving one track.

=== Platforms ===
1	■Towada Kankō Electric Railway Line	for Misawa

== Adjacent stations ==
←	Service	→
Higashino-Danchi	Towada Kankō Electric Railway Line	Terminus

== See also ==
- List of railway stations in Japan
