= Towada Kankō Electric Railway =

Transportation company

Towada-Kankō Electric Railway Co., Ltd. 十和田観光電鉄株式会社
- Type: unlisted stock company
- Industry: Transportation
- Founded: June 1914
- Headquarters: Towada, Aomori, Japan
- Area served: Aomori Prefecture, Japan
- Total equity: 96 million Yen
- Number of employees: 238
- Subsidiaries: Towada Dentetsu Kankosha; Towada Kanko Taxi; Makado Onsen Hotel
- Website: http://www.toutetsu.co.jp/

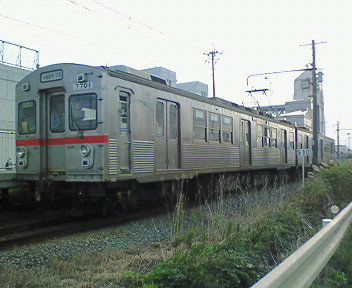
Towada Kanko Electric Railway Moha 7700 Series train

The Towada Kankō Electric Railway (十和田観光電鉄, Towada Kankō Dentetsu), or Tōtetsu (十鉄), is a transportation company that provides transportation services over a wide range of southeastern and central Aomori Prefecture, Japan. The company used to operate the Towada Kankō Electric Railway Line, which connects Misawa Station in the city of Misawa and Towadashi Station in the city of Towada. The line ceased service on April 1, 2012. The company now operates an extensive bus network, and through subsidiary operations, a taxi service, resort hotels and excursion boats on Lake Towada. It is headquartered in the city of Towada.

== History ==
The company began as the Towada Kidō Corporation (十和田軌道株式会社, Towada Kidō Kabushiki Kaisha) on June 26, 1914. It received its permit to start commercial transportation operations in 1917, and began operations using automobiles to connect Furumaki (present day Misawa) with Sanbongi (present day Towada). In 1920, it received its regional rail permit and changed its name to Towada Railway (和田鉄道株式会社, Towada Tetsudō Kabushika-kaisha) on October 30, 1920. The rail line connecting Furumaki with Sanbongi was opened on September 4, 1922. Transit bus operations commenced from August 1926. The company expanded through purchase of smaller regional bus companies through September 1941. However, during World War II, the Land-Transportation Law reorganizes regional transportation businesses, and the government restricted the assets and operations of the Towada Railway to within the borders of Kamikita District, with the remainder given to the now-defunct Nanbu Railway Company.

After World War II, restrictions were lifted, and in 1951 the railway was electrified, and its gauge widened from 762 to 1067 mm. The company assumed its present name on December 30, 1951. From 1954, the company expanded into the organized tour market, and began operating sightseeing excursion boat services on Lake Towada from September 1954. The 1968 Tokachi-oki earthquake caused severe damage to the company's assets, and it came under the aegis of the Kokusai Kōgyō Company from October 1969. On October 28, 1985, the new Towadashi Station station building was opened; the new building containing a Daiei department store as well as the company headquarters. Rail operations past the Misawa terminus to Hachinohe Station began from December 1, 2002.

== Rail operations ==
The Towada Kankō Electric Railway Line was a (Class 1 Railroad Operator), operating eleven stations over a 14.7 kilometres (9.1 mi) route connecting Misawa with Towada. The company ceased railway services on April 1, 2012.

== Bus operations ==
The company operates city buses in Hachinohe, Misawa and Towada, as well as an extensive regional bus network, serving the rural communities of Kamikita and Sannohe Districts of eastern Aomori. In addition to local services within Aomori Prefecture, the company operates Sirius overnight highway bus service from Towada and Hachinohe to Ikebukuro in Tokyo, and Bluestar overnight service from Towada via Aomori to Ikebukuro and Shibuya in Tokyo. Daytime Umineko service connect Hachinohe and Sendai in Miyagi Prefecture, and Blue City service, Aomori and Sendai. Towada Kankō also operates tour bus services from Misawa and Hachinohe to the Towada-Hachimantai National Park.

== Boat operations ==
The Lake Towada Sightseeing Boat (十和田湖遊覧船) operates on two routes during non-winter months on Lake Towada, within the Towada-Hachimantai National Park.

== Other subsidiaries ==
A subsidiary company, Totetsu Kotsu (とうてつ交通株式会社) operates a fleet of taxis within the city of Towada. Another subsidiary operates a hotel and a ski resort operation at Makado Onsen. The company also formerly had a supermarket subsidiary, a store located at Misawa Station, but withdrew from this venture in 2009.
