= Misawa Station =

Railway station in Misawa, Aomori Prefecture, Japan

Misawa Station 三沢駅
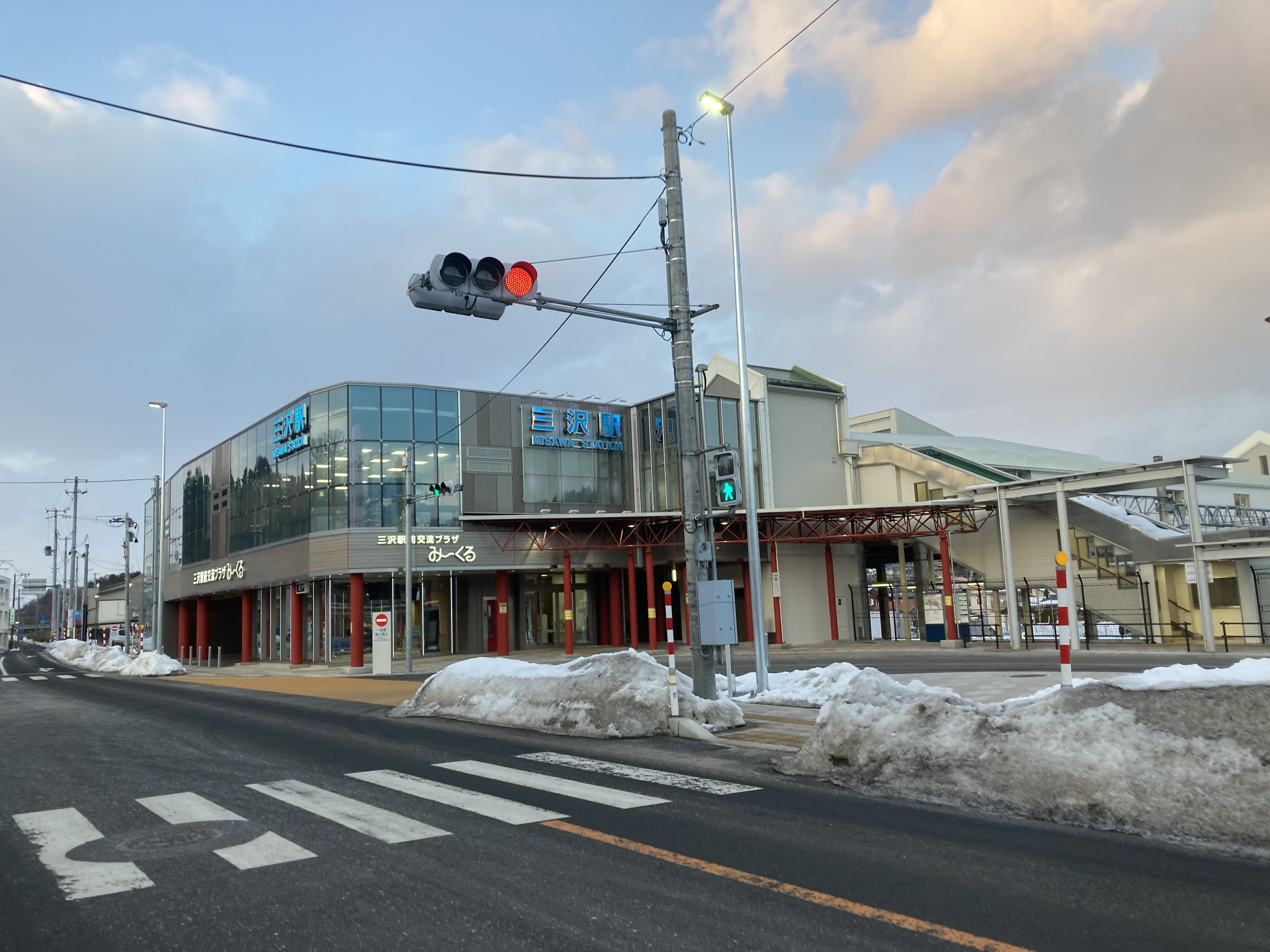
- Misawa Station in February 2021

General information
- Location: Inuotose Furumagi 51-7, Misawa-shi, Aomori-ken 033-0000; Japan
- Coordinates: 40°40′07.82″N 141°21′13.11″E
- System: Regional rail station
- Operator: Aoimori Railway
- Line: ■ Aoimori Railway Line
- Distance: 46.9 km from Aomori
- Platforms: 1 side + 1 island platforms
- Connections: Bus

Construction
- Structure type: Elevated

Other information
- Status: Staffed
- Website: Official website

History
- Opened: 1 September 1894
- Former names: Furumaki (until 1961)

Services
Preceding station	Aoimori Railway	Following station
Shimoda towards Hachinohe	Shimokita	Kamikitachō towards Noheji
Mukaiyama towards Metoki	Aoimori Railway Line	Kogawara towards Aomori
Location
- Location within Aomori Prefecture Location within Japan

Misawa Station (三沢駅, Misawa-eki) is a railway station and major stop along the Aoimori Railway Line in the city of Misawa in Aomori Prefecture, Japan. It is operated by the third sector railway operator Aoimori Railway Company.

== Lines ==
Misawa Station is one of six principal stations served by the Aoimori Railway Line, and is 46.9 kilometers from the terminus of the line at Aomori Station. It is 664.2 kilometers from Tokyo Station.

== Station layout ==
Misawa Station has one ground-level island platform and one ground-level side platform serving three tracks with an elevated station building built over the tracks. The station is staffed The station building has a ticket office, as well as automatic ticket machines.

=== Platforms ===
1	■ Aoimori Railway Line	For Noheji and Aomori
2	■ Aoimori Railway Line	For Hachinohe
3	■ Aoimori Railway Line	(siding)

== History ==
Misawa Station was opened on 1 April 1896 as the Furumaki Station (古間木駅, Furumaki-eki) on the Nippon Railway. It became a station on the Tōhoku Main Line of Japanese Government Railways (JGR), the pre-war predecessor to the Japanese National Railways (JNR), when the Nippon Railway was nationalized on 1 July 1906. On 4 September 1922 it became a joint station, when the Towada Railway (present-day Towada Kankō Electric Railway, also known as Tōtetsu) connected Furumaki with Towadashi Station. The Tōtetsu Furumaki Station was relocated 120 meters away on 1 October 1926 and a new station building was completed on 1 January 1959. The Tōtetsu station was renamed Misawa Station on 1 March 1961 and the JNR station followed on 20 March of the same year. With the privatization of the JNR on 1 April 1987, the JNR Misawa Station came under the operational control of East Japan Railway Company (JR East) and Japan Freight Railway Company (JR Freight). Freight services were discontinued in June 2006. The control of the Tōhoku Main Line (between Hachinohe and Aomori) was transferred to Aoimori Railway on 4 December 2010, the day the Tōhoku Shinkansen was extended to Shin-Aomori. On 1 April 2012 Towada Kankō Electric Railway discontinued its railway business. The station building was expanded following the opening of a plaza extension on 4 April 2020.

Until the operational change in 2010, the JR station was served by the limited express trains Tsugaru, Hakuchō and Super Hakuchō. As of January 2021, the only JR East limited express train to stop at Misawa Station is the Resort Asunaro sightseeing train that runs between Hachinohe and Ōminato stations.

== Surrounding area ==
- Aomori Prefectural Misawa Commercial High School
- Komaki Onsen
- Misawa Station Post Office

== See also ==
- List of railway stations in Japan

== Gallery ==
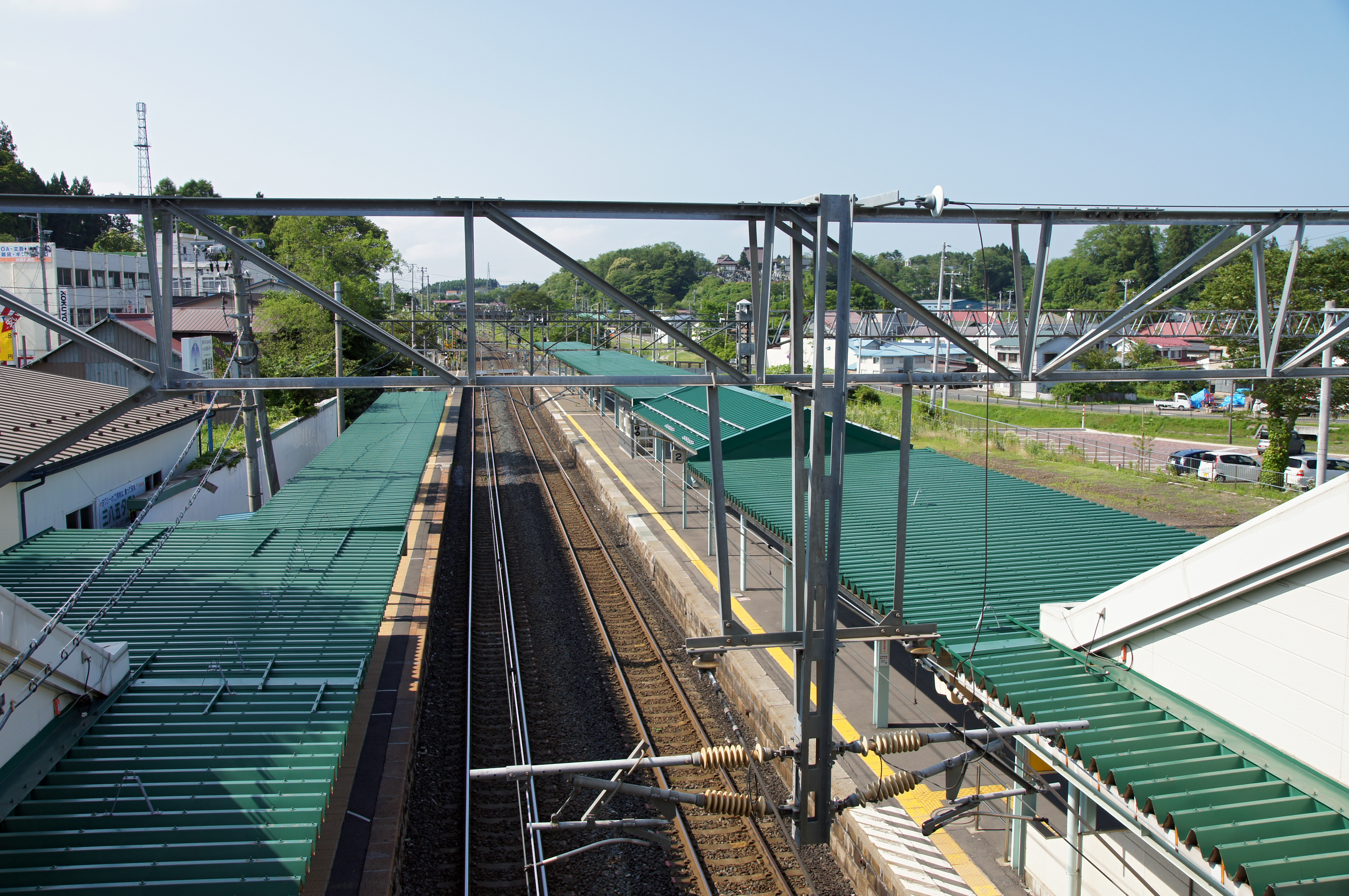
JR tracks and platforms from pedestrian bridge.

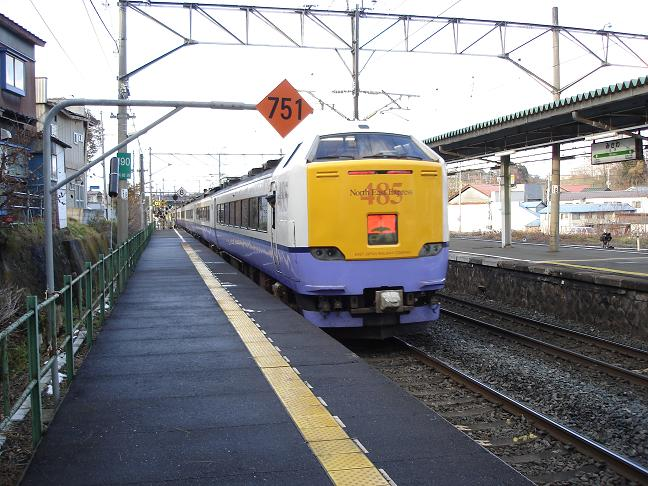
JR East Hakuchō limited express departing northbound from the Misawa train station.

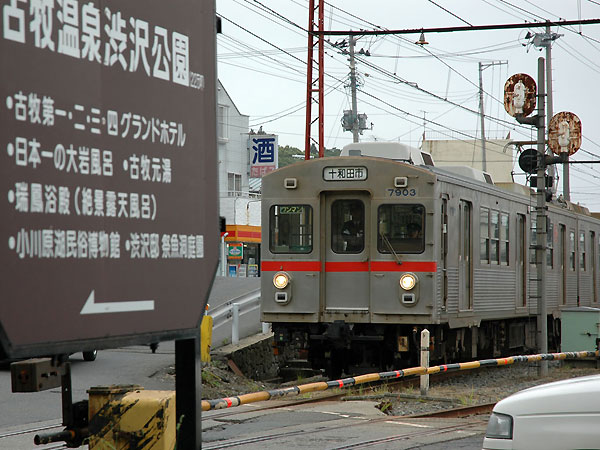
Tōtetsu train leaves Misawa station

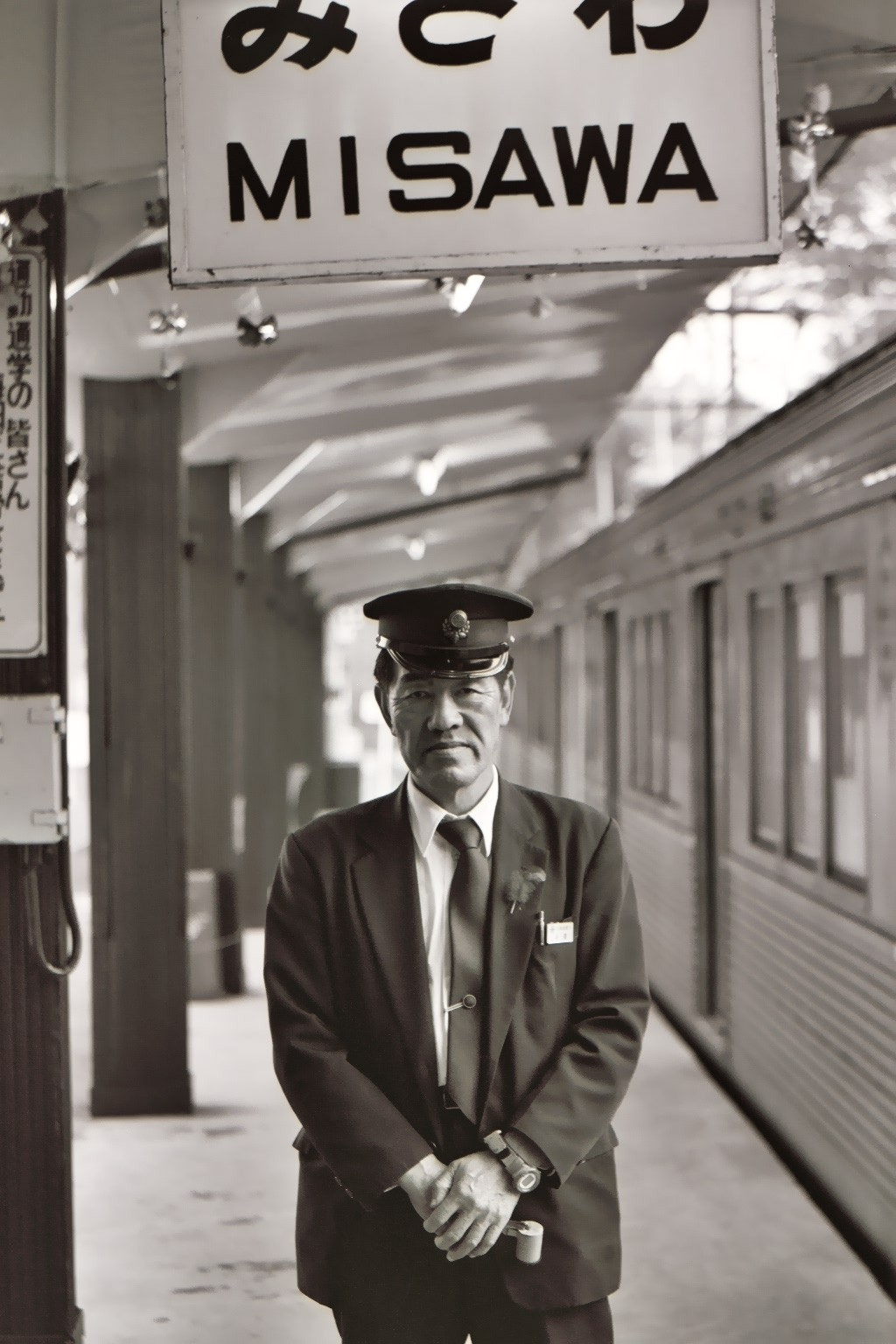
Ticket inspector on Tōtetsu platform (October 2005)
