= Unoki Station =

Railway station in Tokyo, Japan

Coordinates: 35.5754°N 139.6803°E

Unoki Station 鵜の木駅

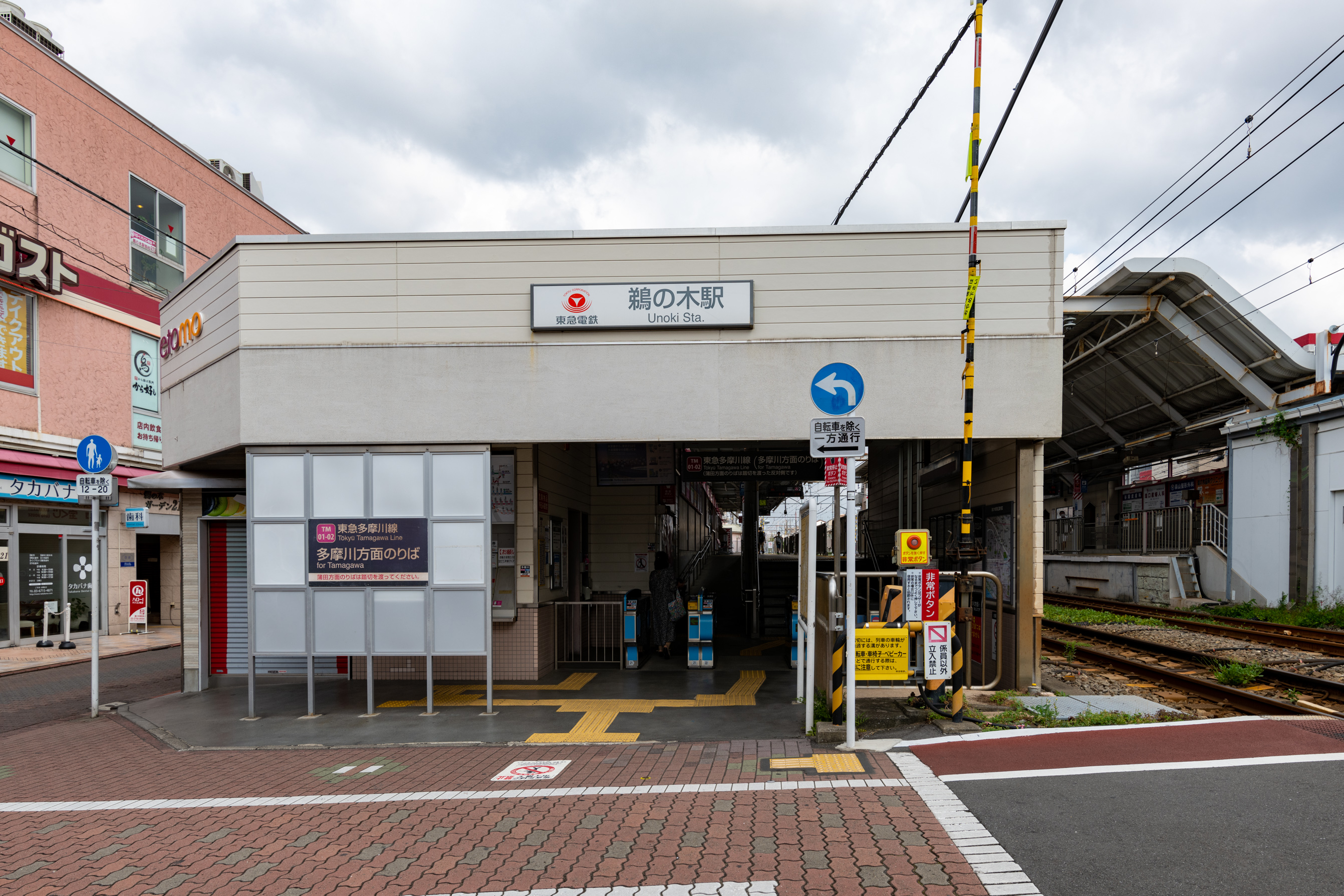

General information
- Location: 2-4-1 Unoki, Ōta Ward; Tokyo; Japan
- Operator: Tōkyū Railways
- Line: Tōkyū Tamagawa Line
- Platforms: 2 side platforms
- Tracks: 2

Construction
- Structure type: At grade

Other information
- Station code: TM03

History
- Opened: 29 February 1924; 102 years ago
- Former names: (until January 20, 1966)

Passengers
- 2021: 16,362

Services
Preceding station	Tōkyū Railways	Following station
Numabe towards Tamagawa	Tōkyū Tamagawa Line	Shimomaruko towards Kamata
Location
- Location within Special wards of Tokyo Location within Tokyo Bay and Bōsō Peninsula Location within Tokyo Location within Japan

Unoki Station (鵜の木駅, -eki) is a Tokyo Kyuko Electric Railway Tamagawa Line station located in Ōta city, Tokyo, Japan.

== Station layout ==
Two ground-level side platforms.

1	■ Tamagawa Line	Kamata
2	■ Tamagawa Line	Tamagawa

== History ==
- February 29, 1924 Opened as 鵜ノ木駅(unoki eki) of Meguro-Kamata Electric Railway Mekama line.
- November 16, 1939 Became a station of Tokyo-Yokohama Electric Railway by merging.
- May 26, 1942 Became a station of Tokyo Kyuko Electric Railway by merging.
- January 20, 1966 Renamed to the present name.
- August 6, 2000 Became a station of Tokyu Tamagawa Line by division of Tokyu Mekama Line.
