= Musashi-nitta Station =

Railway station in Tokyo, Japan

Coordinates: 35.5678°N 139.6927°E

Musashi-Nitta Station 武蔵新田駅

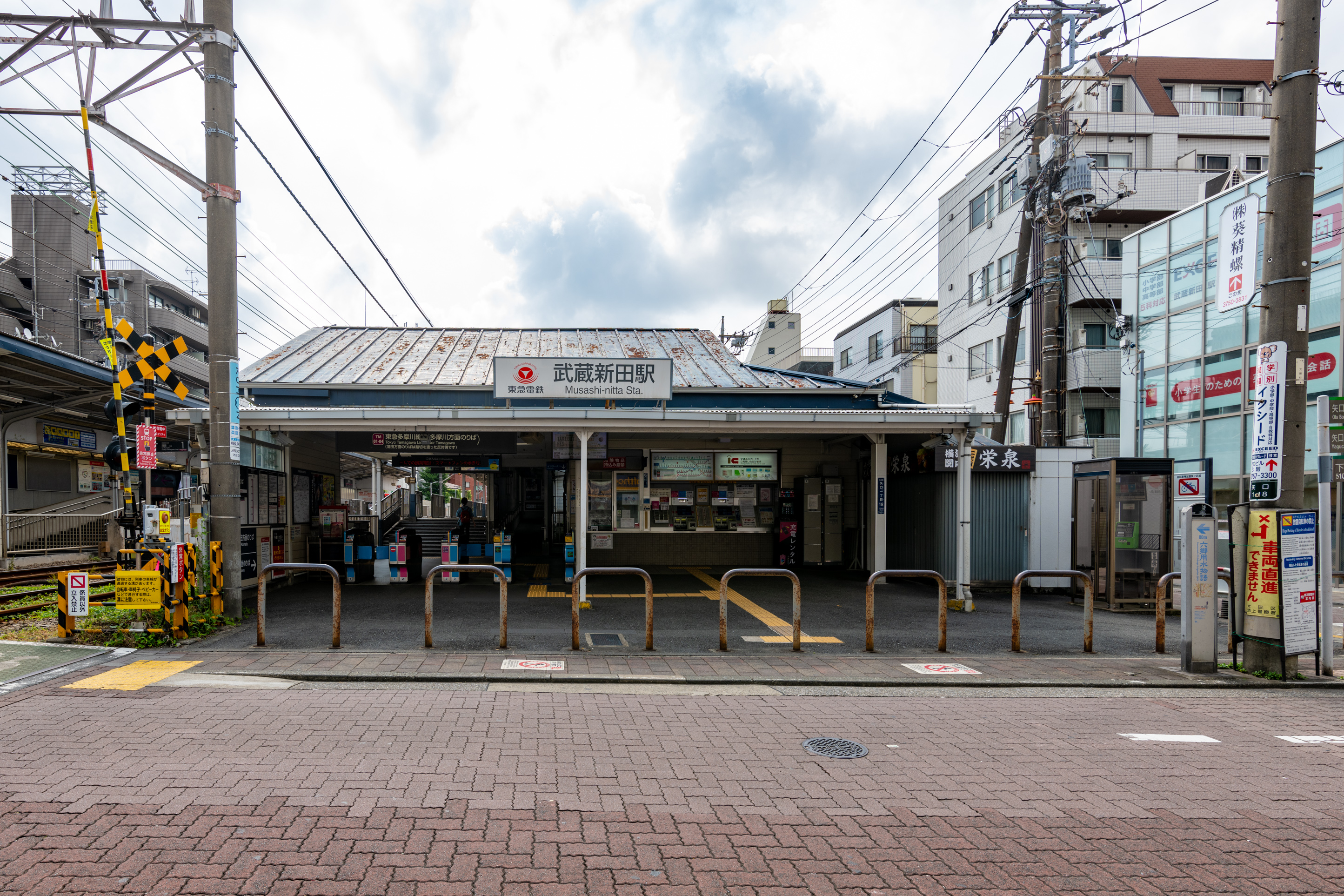

General information
- Location: 1-18-1 Yaguchi, Ota Ward; Tokyo; Japan
- Operator: Tōkyū Railways
- Line: Tōkyū Tamagawa Line
- Platforms: 2 side platforms
- Tracks: 2

Construction
- Structure type: At grade

Other information
- Station code: TM05

History
- Opened: 1 November 1923; 102 years ago
- Former names: Nitta (until June 1924)

Passengers
- 27,182 daily

Services
Preceding station	Tōkyū Railways	Following station
Shimomaruko towards Tamagawa	Tōkyū Tamagawa Line	Yaguchinowatashi towards Kamata
Location

Musashi-Nitta Station (武蔵新田駅, Musashi-Nitta-eki) is a railway station on the Tokyu Tamagawa Line in Ōta, Tokyo, Japan, operated by Tokyu Corporation.

== Station layout ==
The station consists of two ground-level side platforms.

=== Platforms ===
1	■ Tokyu Tamagawa Line	for Kamata
2	■ Tokyu Tamagawa Line	for Tamagawa

== History ==
The station first opened as Nitta Station (新田駅) on November 1, 1923. It was renamed Musashi-Nitta in June 1924.
