= Kama-Kama Line =

Overview
- Other name: New Airport Line
- Native name: 蒲蒲線
- Status: Planning
- Locale: Ota, Tokyo, Japan
- Stations: 2

Service
- Type: Commuter rail
- Operator(s): Tokyu Corporation and Haneda Airport Line

History
- Opened: 2038 to 2042 (planned)

Technical
- Line length: 3.1 km (1.9 mi)
- Number of tracks: 2
- Track gauge: 1,067 mm (3 ft 6 in)
- Electrification: 1,500 V

The Kama-Kama Line (蒲蒲線, Kama-kama sen), also known as the New Airport Line (新空港線, Shin-kūkō-sen) is a proposed 3.1 km (1.9 mi) railway line in the city of Ota, Tokyo, Japan, connecting the Tōkyū Tamagawa Line (which currently terminates at Kamata Station) to the Keikyū Airport Line (which currently terminates at Keikyū Kamata Station). One envisioned purpose of the line is to carry Haneda traffic to and from central Tokyo stations such as Ikebukuro and Shibuya via the Tokyu network and the Tokyo Metro Fukutoshin Line.

As of January 2025, the line is pending government review and approval, and is expected to commence operations between Yaguchinowatashi and Keikyu-Kamata sometime between 2038 and 2042.

== Design and configuration ==
The new line is designed to branch off from the Tokyu Tamagawa Line near Yaguchinowatashi Station, and from there enter a 1.7 km (1.1 mi) tunnel which would include new underground stations at Kamata and Keikyu Kamata. The line would emerge from the tunnel past Keikyu Kamata to join the Keikyu Airport Line between Kojiya Station and Otorii Station.

One major issue with the project is that there is a difference in track gauge between the Tokyu Tamagawa Line, which uses 1,067 mm (3 ft 6 in) gauge, and the Keikyu Airport Line, which uses standard gauge. Ota City's proposal to address this issue called for the line to initially terminate at Keikyu Kamata, allowing same-station transfers between Tokyu and Keikyu trains at Kamata, and then to eventually offer through service to the Airport Line either by using Gauge Change Trains or by upgrading the Airport Line to dual gauge. However, the former have yet to be successfully deployed in Japan, while the latter would require a long-term shutdown of the Keikyu Airport Line. A third proposal calls for the new line to terminate at Otorii, where airport passengers would be required to change trains.

Through service to and from Shibuya via the Toyoko Line may also require significant upgrades to the Tamagawa Line, which is constructed for three-car trains and runs mostly at grade with numerous level crossings. Ota City has invested 6.2 million yen to study the potential conversion of the Tamagawa Line to an elevated line.

== History ==
The two major train stations in the Kamata area, Kamata and Keikyu Kamata, are located 800 m (2,600 ft) apart, and a transfer between the stations requires a 10-minute walk. Ota City has had plans to connect the stations since 1982. The line was initially envisioned primarily as a convenience for commuters, but started to be officially dubbed as a Haneda Airport access line around 2007, in order to increase its appeal to other government and private entities.

Although the Tokyo metropolitan government indicated skepticism about the need for the line, Ota has promoted its construction to national government officials. A study released by Ota in December 2015 estimated the economic impact of the line at around 239 billion yen, of which construction impact would account for around 184 billion yen and passenger consumption impact would account for around 54 billion yen.

The Ota and Tokyo governments agreed in 2022 to divide the cost of the line, aiming to commence operation in 2035. As of 2022, the estimated project cost was 136 billion yen, and it was projected that the line would turn a profit after 17 years of operation. A third sector operating company, Haneda Airport Line, was founded in October 2022 with investment from Ota City and Tokyu. Tokyu applied for government approval of the new line in January 2025, at which point the project cost was estimated at 125 billion yen.

== See also ==
- Keikyū Airport Line
- Tokyo Monorail
- Haneda Airport Access Line (planned)
