= Shimomaruko Station =

Railway station in Tokyo, Japan

Coordinates: 35.5713°N 139.6856°E

Shimomaruko Station 下丸子駅

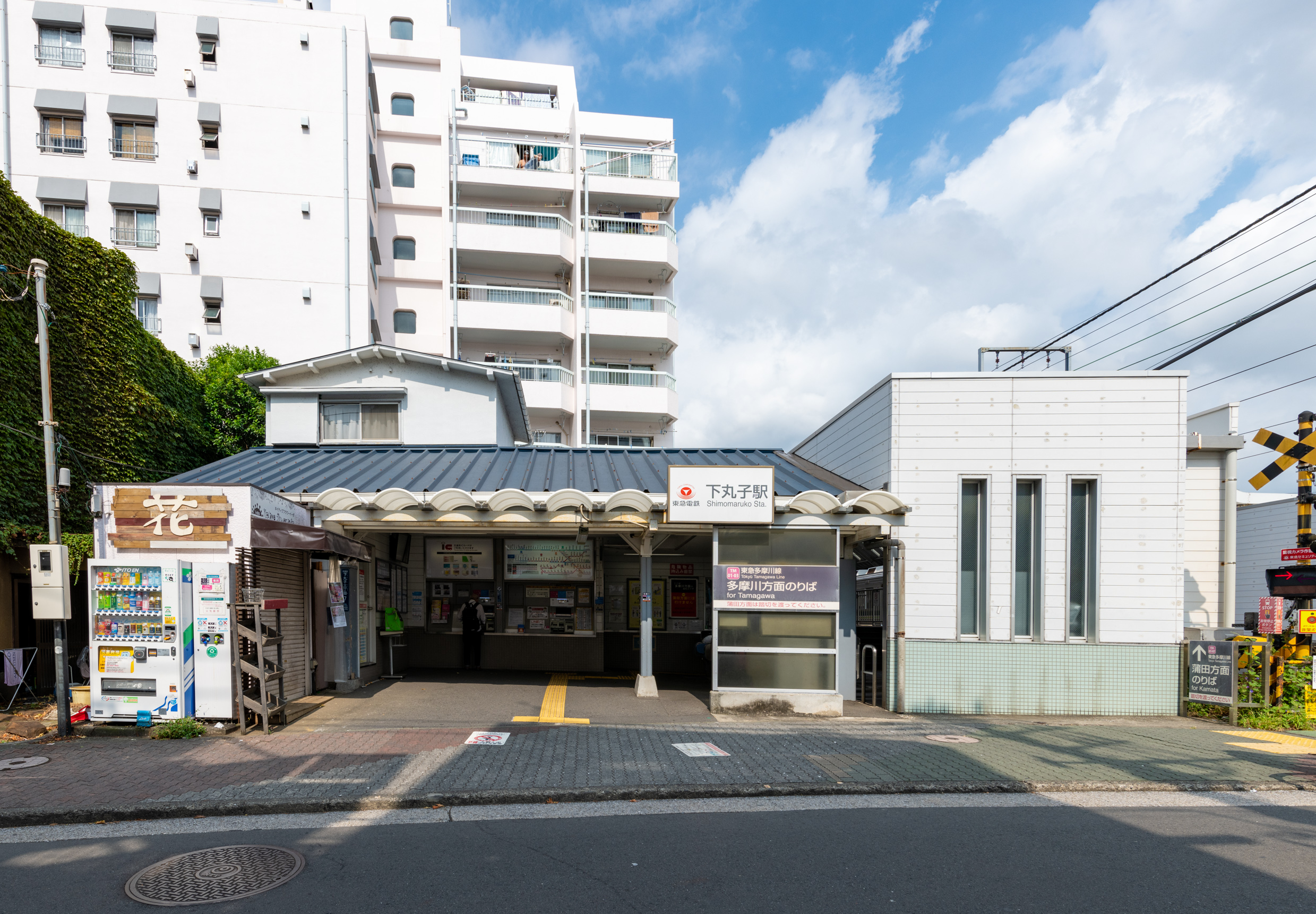
- Entrance to platform No. 2

General information
- Location: 3-7-1 Shimomaruko, Ota Ward; Tokyo; Japan
- Operator: Tōkyū Railways
- Line: Tōkyū Tamagawa Line
- Platforms: 2 side platforms
- Tracks: 2

Construction
- Structure type: At grade

Other information
- Station code: TM04

History
- Opened: 2 May 1924; 102 years ago

Passengers
- 2021: 28,099

Services
Preceding station	Tōkyū Railways	Following station
Unoki towards Tamagawa	Tōkyū Tamagawa Line	Musashi-nitta towards Kamata
Location

Shimomaruko Station (下丸子駅, Shimomaruko-eki) is a Tokyu Tamagawa Line station located in Ōta, Tokyo.

== Station layout ==
The station is composed of two ground-level side platforms.

1	■ Tokyu Tamagawa Line	Kamata
2	■ Tokyu Tamagawa Line	Tamagawa

== History ==
- May 2, 1924: The station opens.
- October 1998: The station becomes unstaffed (it’s controlled by Kamata Station).

In 2021, the average number of daily passengers at Shimomaruko Station was 28,099, the second-most of all the stations on the Tokyo Tamagawa line.
