= Numabe Station =

Railway station in Tokyo, Japan

Coordinates: 35.5824°N 139.6731°E

Numabe Station 沼部駅

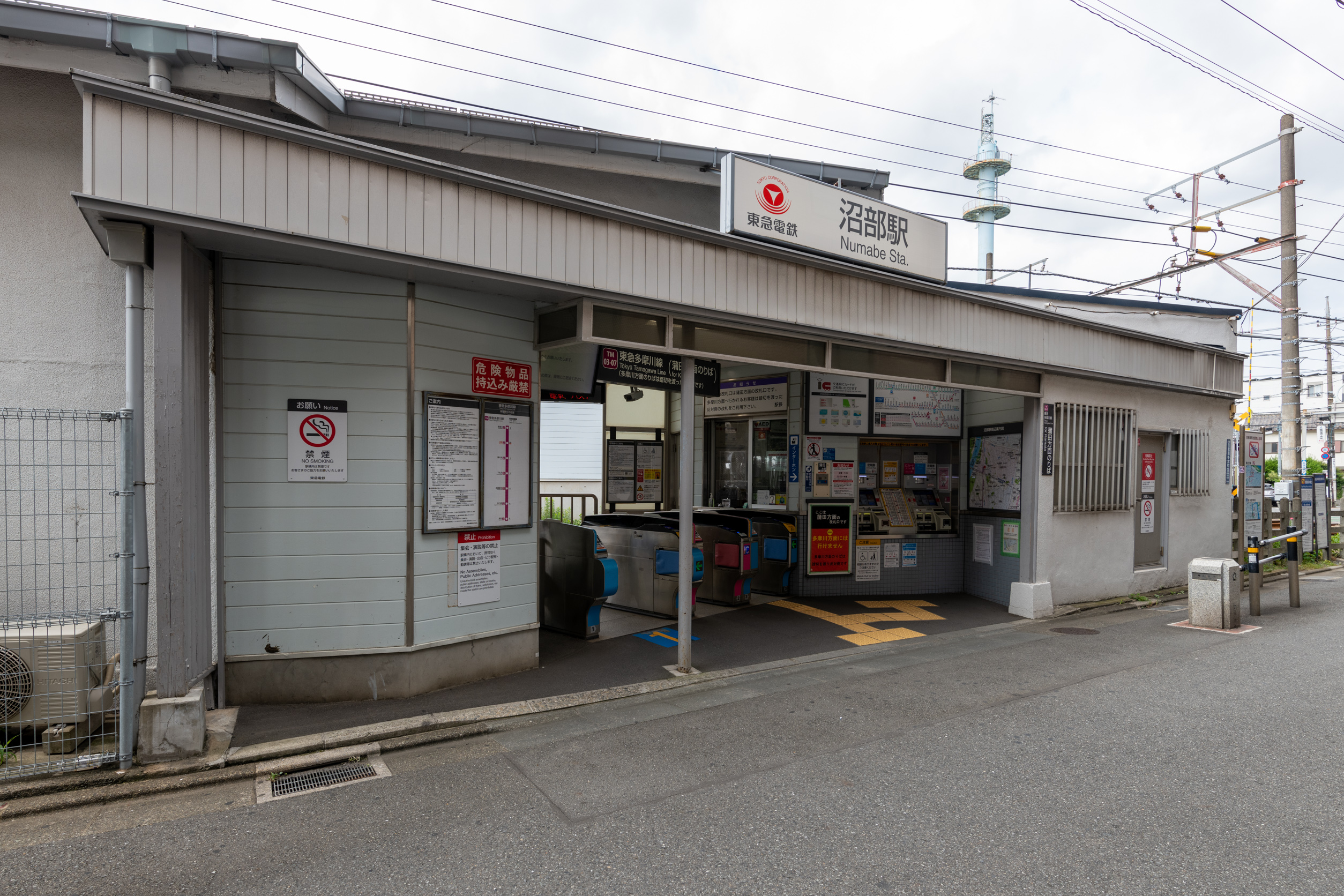
- Entrance to platform No. 1

General information
- Location: Ota, Tokyo; Japan
- Operator: Tōkyū Railways
- Line: Tōkyū Tamagawa Line
- Platforms: 2 side platforms
- Tracks: 2

Construction
- Structure type: At grade

Other information
- Station code: TM02

History
- Opened: 11 March 1923; 103 years ago
- Former names: Maruko Station; Musashi-Maruko (until 1926)

Services
Preceding station	Tōkyū Railways	Following station
Tamagawa Terminus	Tōkyū Tamagawa Line	Unoki towards Kamata
Location
- Location within Special wards of Tokyo Location within Tokyo Bay and Bōsō Peninsula Location within Tokyo Location within Japan

Numabe Station (沼部駅, Numabe-eki) is a Tokyu Corporation Tokyu Tamagawa Line station located in Ōta, Tokyo. Trains run to the terminal Tamagawa Station in the north, and to Kamata Station terminal in the south-east.

== Station layout ==
This station has two ground-level side platforms.

1	■ Tokyu Tamagawa Line	Kamata
2	■ Tokyu Tamagawa Line	Tamagawa

== History ==
- March 11, 1923: Opened as Maruko Station of Meguro Kamata Railway.
- June 1, 1924: Renamed to Musashi-Maruko Station.
- January 1, 1926: Renamed to Numabe Station.
