= Tōkyū Tamagawa Line =

Commuter railway line in Tokyo, Japan

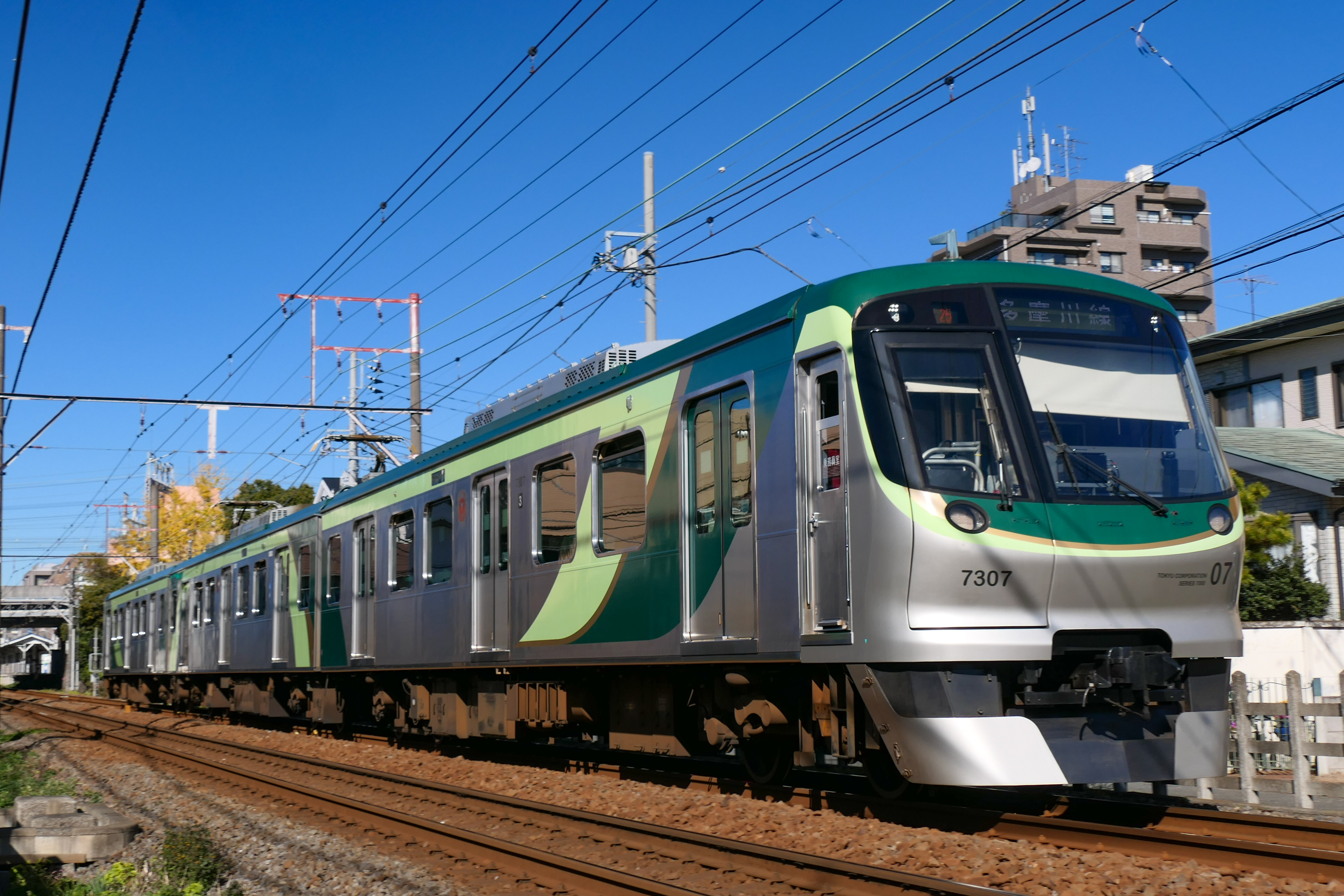
- A Tamagawa Line 7000 series train, December 2021

Overview
- Native name: 東急多摩川線
- Status: In service
- Owner: Tokyu Corporation
- Locale: Tokyo
- Termini: Tamagawa; Kamata
- Stations: 7
- Color on map: Magenta (#ae0378)

Service
- Type: Commuter rail
- System: Tokyu Railways
- Route number: TM
- Operator(s): Tokyu Corporation

History
- Opened: 11 March 1923; 103 years ago

Technical
- Line length: 5.6 km (3.5 mi)
- Track gauge: 1,067 mm (3 ft 6 in)
- Electrification: 1,500 V DC overhead catenary
- Operating speed: 80 km/h (50 mph)

The Tōkyū Tamagawa Line (東急多摩川線, Tōkyū Tamagawa-sen) is a commuter railway line in Japan owned by private railway operator Tokyu Corporation. It runs between Tamagawa and Kamata in southwest Tokyo, entirely within Ōta ward. The operator's name, Tōkyū, is included in the formal name of this line.

It was formed in 2000 from the western portion of the Tōkyū Mekama Line, which was then rerouted west of Tamagawa (former Tamagawa-en) station and renamed the Meguro Line.

This line should not be confused with the Tokyu Shin-Tamagawa Line (a section of track from Shibuya to Futako-tamagawa, (which has since been absorbed into the Tokyu Den-en-Toshi Line), or the Tamagawa Line tramway which preceded that (a former branch of which now forms the Setagaya Line).

== Station list ==
All stations are located in Ota.

| No. | Station name | Japanese | Distance (km) | Transfers |
|---|---|---|---|---|
| TM-01 | Tamagawa | 多摩川 | 0.0 | Tōyoko Line (TY09); Meguro Line (MG09) |
| TM-02 | Numabe | 沼部 | 0.9 | |
| TM-03 | Unoki | 鵜の木 | 1.9 | |
| TM-04 | Shimomaruko | 下丸子 | 2.6 | |
| TM-05 | Musashi-nitta | 武蔵新田 | 3.3 | |
| TM-06 | Yaguchinowatashi | 矢口渡 | 4.2 | |
| TM-07 | Kamata | 蒲田 | 5.6 | Ikegami Line (IK15); Keihin–Tōhoku Line (JK17) |

== Rolling stock ==
All the rolling stock is shared with Tokyu Ikegami Line.

=== Current ===
- 1000 series 3-car sets (since 1990)
- 7000 series 3-car sets (since 2007)
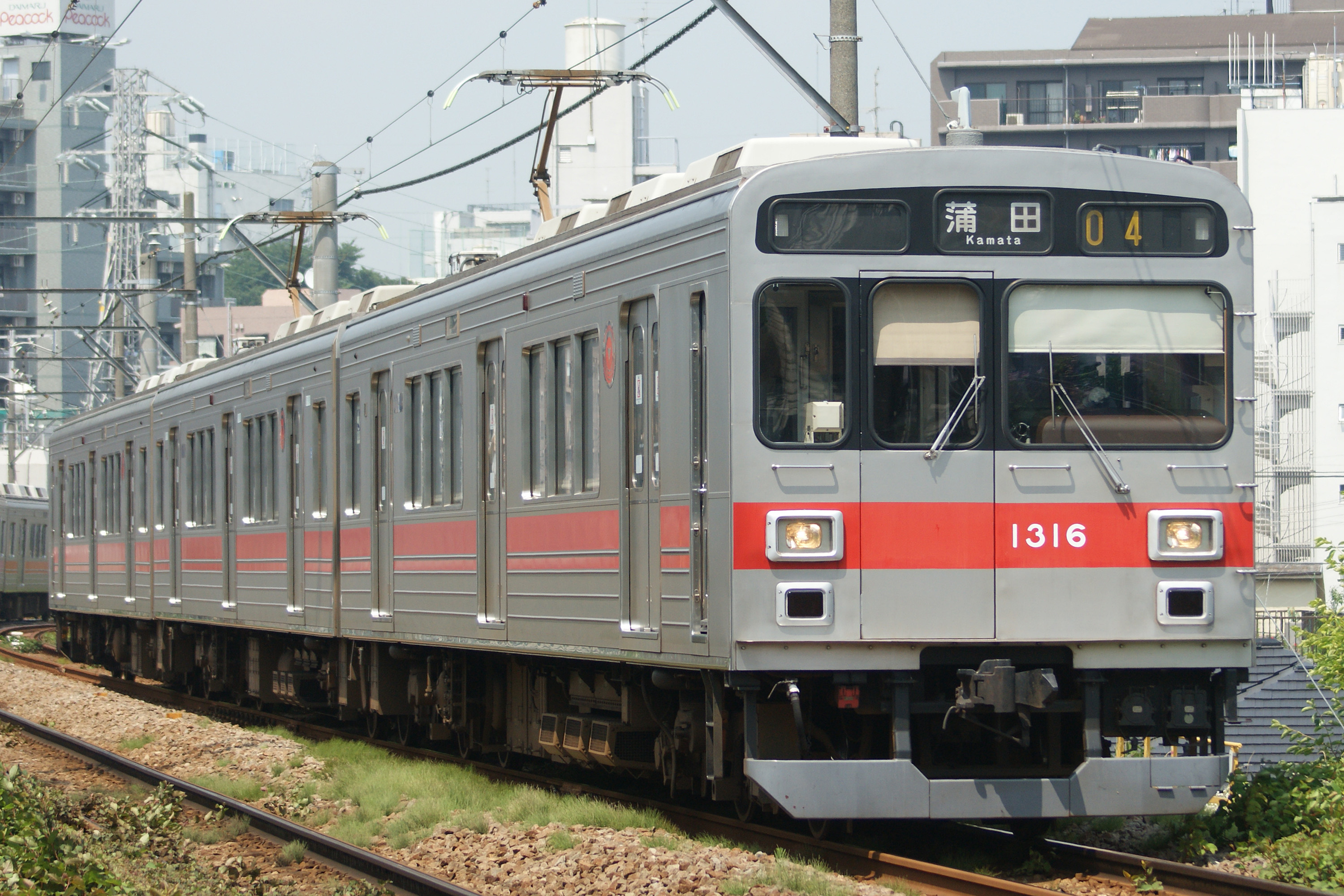
A 1000 series EMU

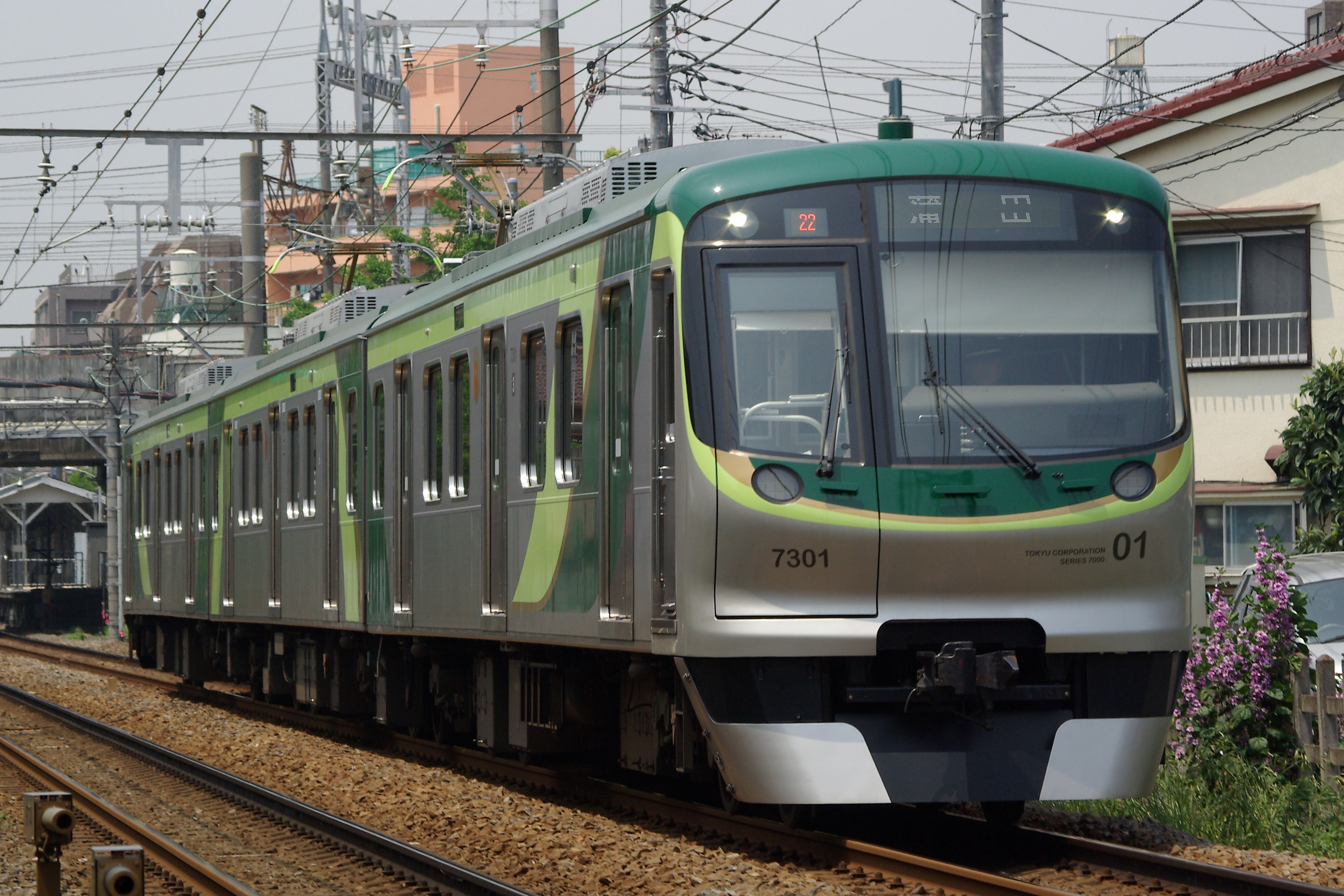
A 7000 series EMU

=== Former ===
- 7600 series 3-car sets (until 2015)
- 7700 series 3-car sets (until 2018)
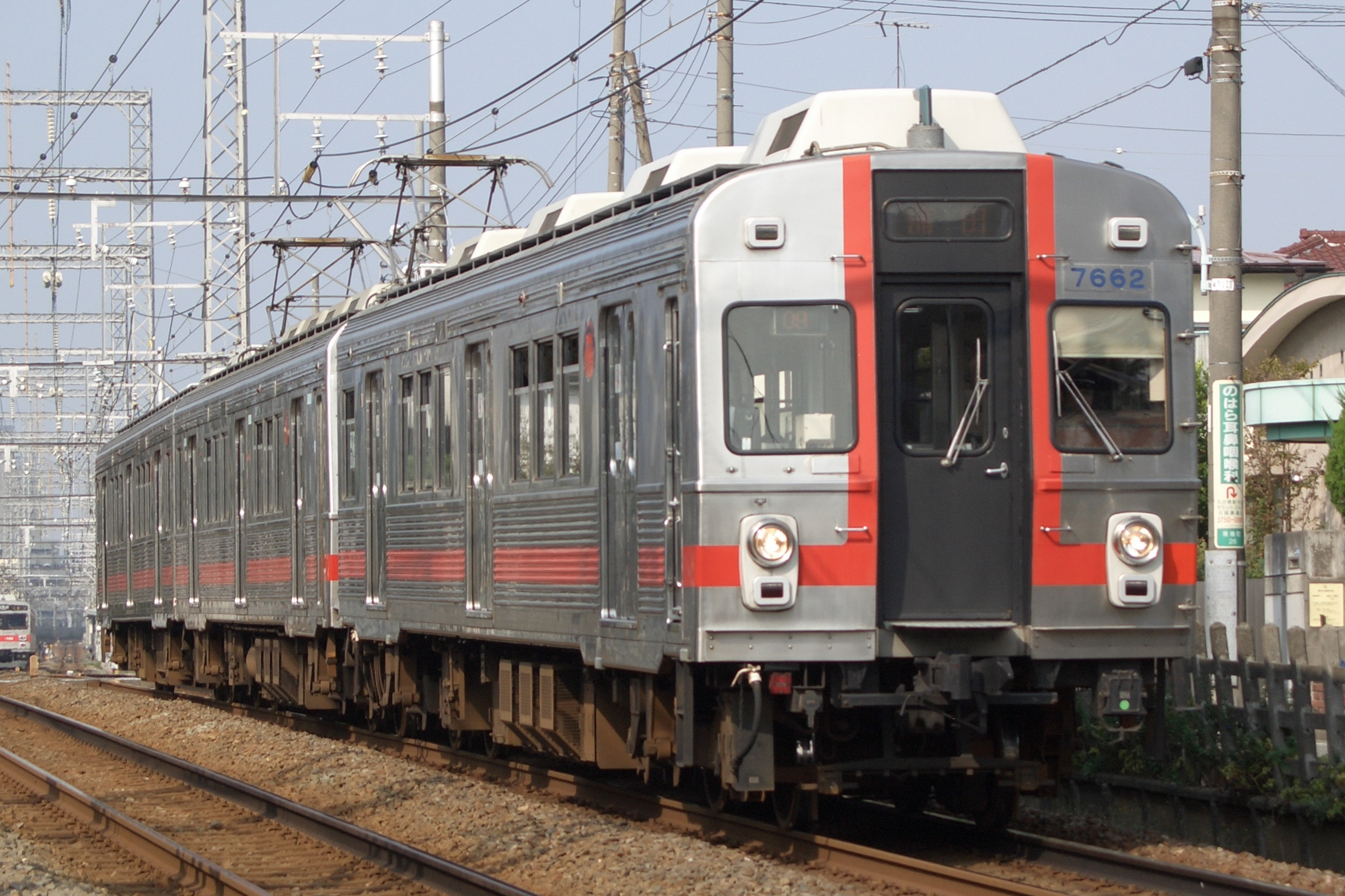
A 7600 series EMU in November 2006

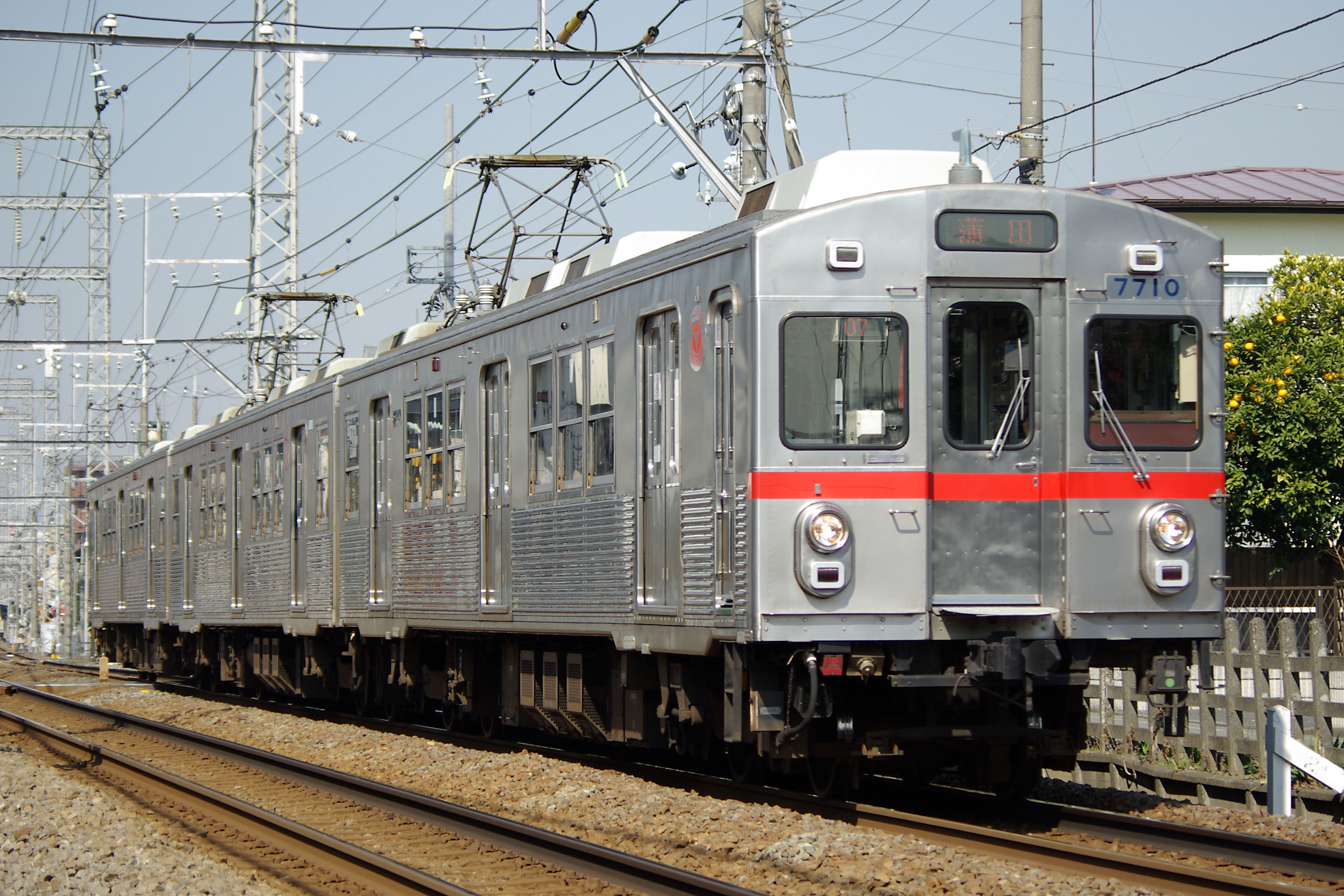
A 7700 series EMU in February 2007

== History ==
The Tokyu Tamagawa Line was formed on 6 August 2000 with the splitting of the former Tokyu Mekama Line. Wanman driver-only operation also commenced on the line from this date.

== Future plans ==
Plans exist to extend the line eastward by approximately 800 m from the southern terminus of the line at Kamata to Keikyu Kamata Station on the Keikyu Main Line and Keikyu Airport Line, a project known as the Kama-Kama Line. This would provide an interchange between the lines, improving accessibility to Tokyo's Haneda Airport ahead of the 2020 Summer Olympics. The plans did not materialize in time for the 2020 Summer Olympics. As of June 2022, Ōta Ward has agreed with the Tokyo Metropolitan Government to pay 70% of the project cost of ¥136 billion (2021) (equivalent to ¥147.89 billion or US$977.06 million in 2024) while having the city government responsible for the remaining 30%.
