= Yaguchinowatashi Station =

Railway station in Tokyo, Japan

Coordinates: 35.5625°N 139.7004°E

Yaguchinowatashi Station 矢口渡駅

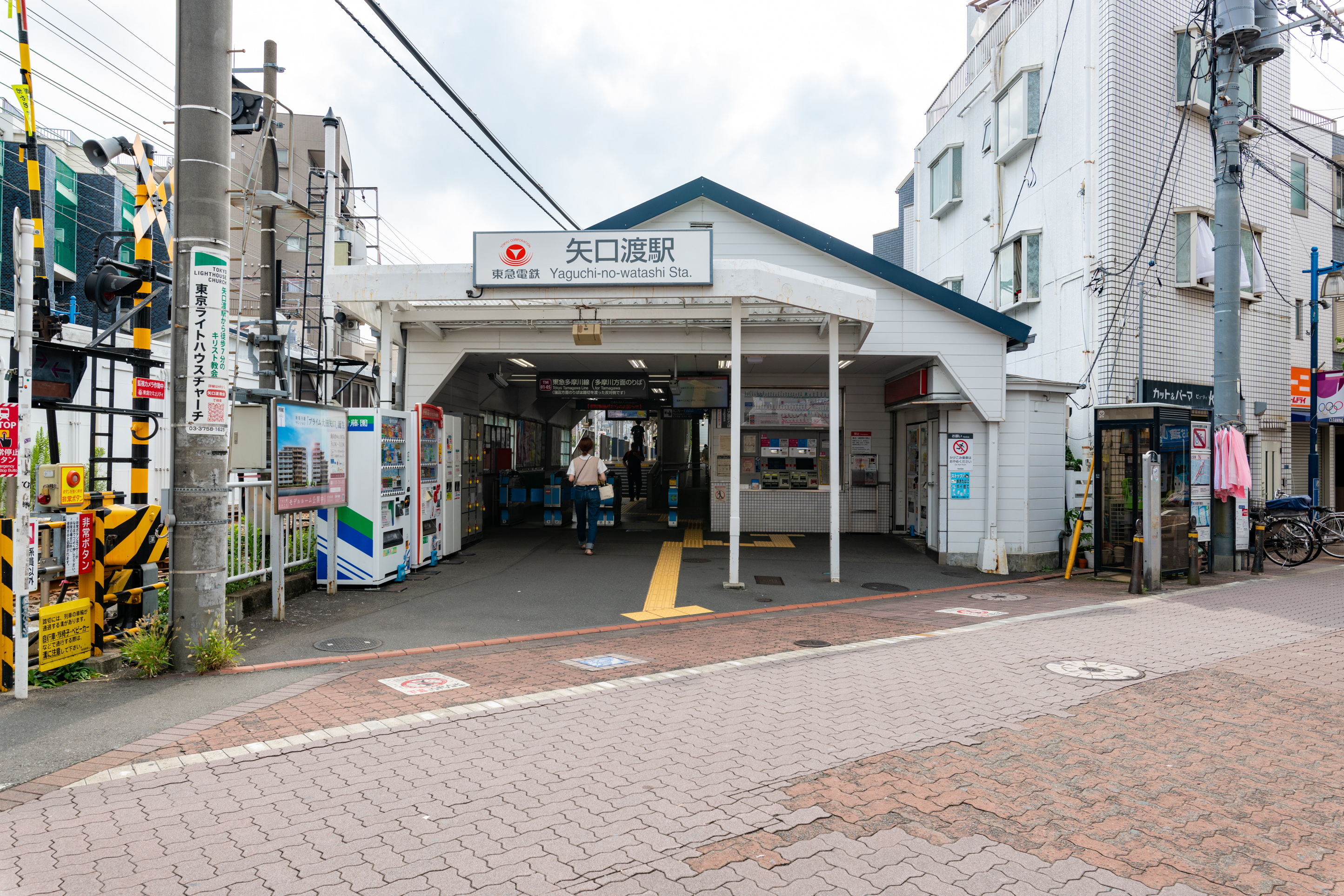

General information
- Location: 20-10 Tamagawa 1-chome, Ota Ward; Tokyo; Japan
- Operator: Tōkyū Railways
- Line: Tōkyū Tamagawa Line
- Platforms: 2 side platforms
- Tracks: 2

Construction
- Structure type: At grade

Other information
- Station code: TM06

History
- Opened: 1 November 1923; 102 years ago
- Former names: Yaguchi (until 1930)

Services
Preceding station	Tōkyū Railways	Following station
Musashi-nitta towards Tamagawa	Tōkyū Tamagawa Line	Kamata Terminus
Location
- Location within Special wards of Tokyo Location within Tokyo Bay and Bōsō Peninsula Location within Tokyo Location within Japan

Yaguchinowatashi Station (矢口渡駅, Yaguchinowatashi-eki) is a Tokyu Tamagawa Line station located in Ōta, Tokyo.

== Station layout ==
Two ground-level side platforms.

1	■ Tamagawa Line	Kamata
2	■ Tamagawa Line	Tamagawa

== History ==
- November 1, 1923 Opened as 矢口駅 (Yaguchi eki).
- May 21, 1930 Renamed to the present name.
