= Tokyu 7700 series =

Electric multiple unit train type operated by Tokyu Corporation in Japan

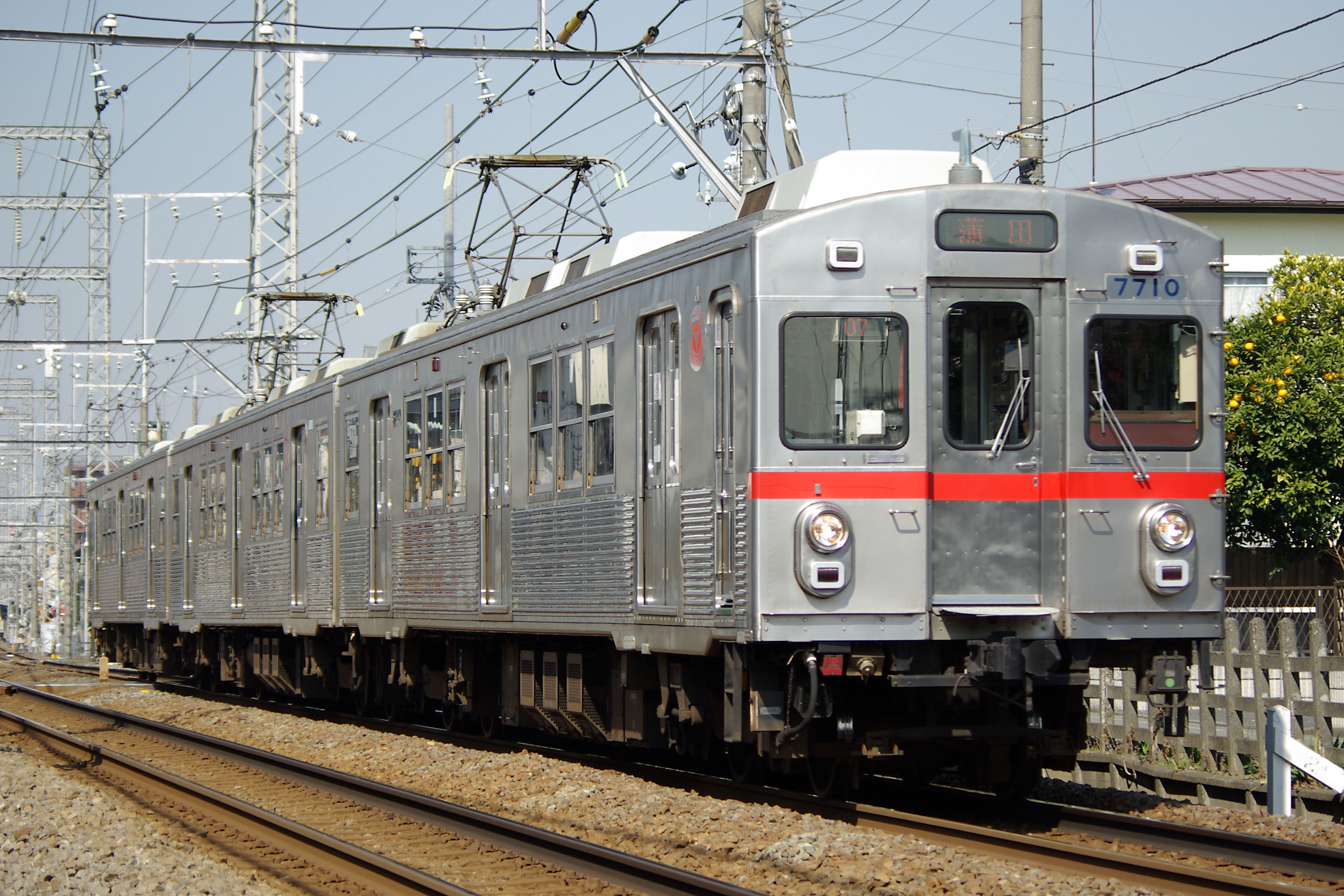
- 7700 series set 7910 on the Tokyu Ikegami Line in February 2007
- In service: August 1987 – November 2018
- Manufacturer: Tokyu Car Corporation
- Constructed: 1962–1965 (as Tokyu 7000 series)
- Entered service: 1 August 1987
- Refurbished: 1987–1990 (conversions from Tokyu 7000 series)
- Scrapped: 2000–
- Number built: 56 vehicles
- Number in service: None
- Number preserved: 1 vehicle (cab end only)
- Formation: 3 cars per trainset
- Fleet numbers: 7901-7915
- Operator: Tokyu Corporation
- Lines served: Tokyu Ikegami Line; Tokyu Tamagawa Line

Specifications
- Car body construction: Stainless steel
- Car length: 18,000 mm (59 ft 5/8 in)
- Doors: 3 pairs per side
- Maximum speed: 85 km/h (55 mph)
- Traction system: Variable frequency (GTO) (sets 7901-7914); Variable frequency (IGBT) (set 7915)
- Electric system: 1,500 V DC Overhead wire
- Current collection: Pantograph
- Track gauge: 1,067 mm (3 ft 6 in)

The Tokyu 7700 series (東急7700系, Tōkyū 7700-kei) was an electric multiple unit (EMU) train type operated by the private railway operator Tokyu Corporation on the Tokyu Ikegami and Tokyu Tamagawa lines in Japan from 1987 to 2018.

== Design ==
The 7700 series trains were formed between 1987 and 1990 using the bodies of former Tokyu 7000 series trains dating from the 1960s, which were modernized with air-conditioning and mated with new bogies and variable-frequency motor drives. Cars were 18 metres (59 ft 1 in) long and had three pairs of doors per side.

== Operations ==
The trains were formed as three-car sets and used on the Tokyu Ikegami Line and Tokyu Tamagawa Line.

== Formations ==
The fleet consisted of 15 three-car sets, formed as follows, with two motored ("M") cars and one non-powered trailer ("T") car, and car 1 at the Gotanda/Tamagawa end.

Car No.	1	2	3
Designation	Tc	M	Mc
Numbering	79xx	78xx	77xx

Cars 2 and 3 were each fitted with one lozenge-type pantograph.

== Interior ==
Passenger accommodation consisted of longitudinal seating throughout, with a mixture of brown and orange seat moquette.

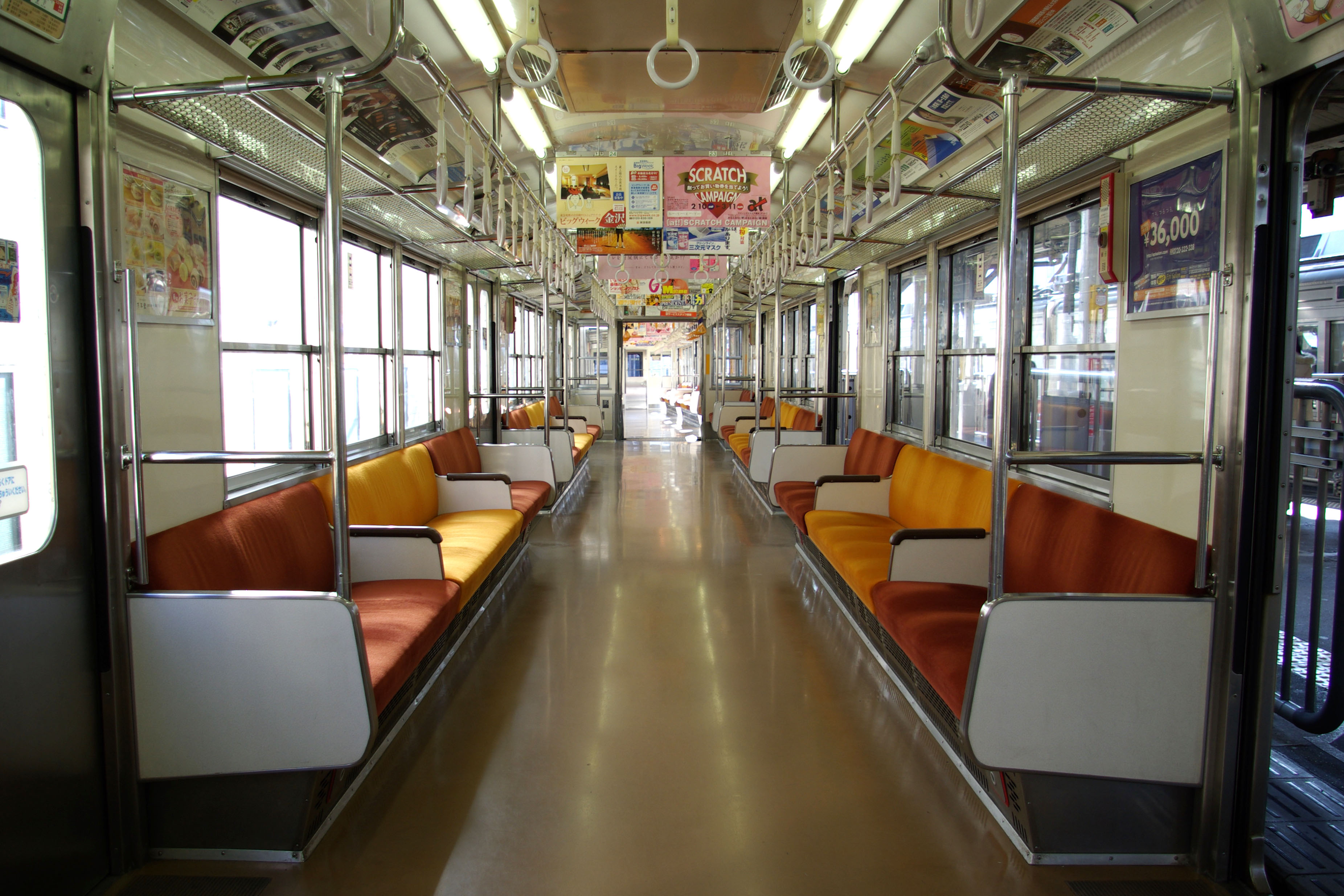
The interior of intermediate car 7810 in February 2007

== History ==
The 7700 series trains sets were initially formed as two- and four-car sets; however, the fleet was subsequently reformed into three-car sets. Set 7915 was formed in 1996 from three former intermediate cars, and had newly-added cab ends of the same design as the Tokyu 1000 series and Tokyu 9000 series trains. This set was withdrawn in 2010.

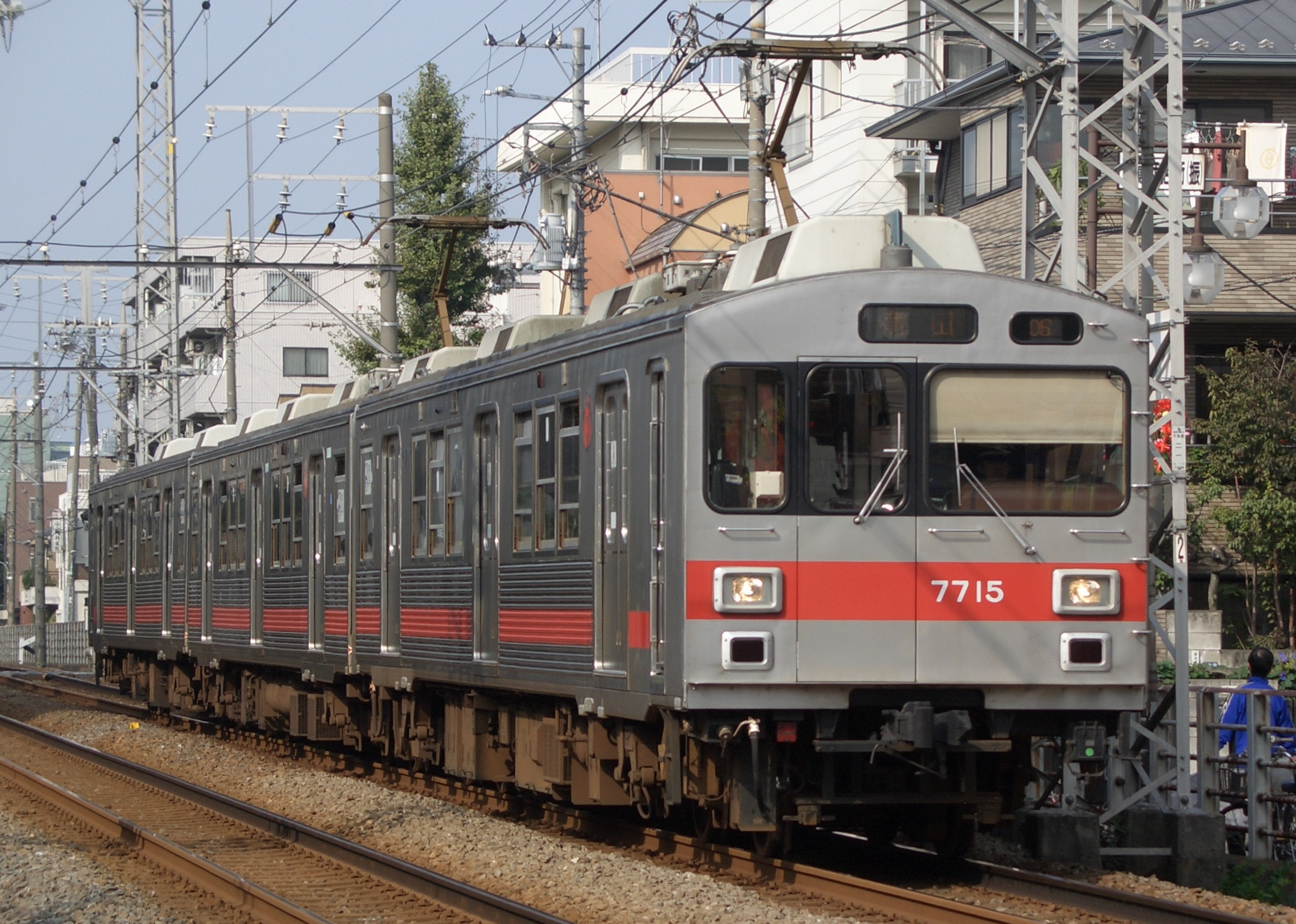
Set 7915 in November 2006

== Livery variations ==
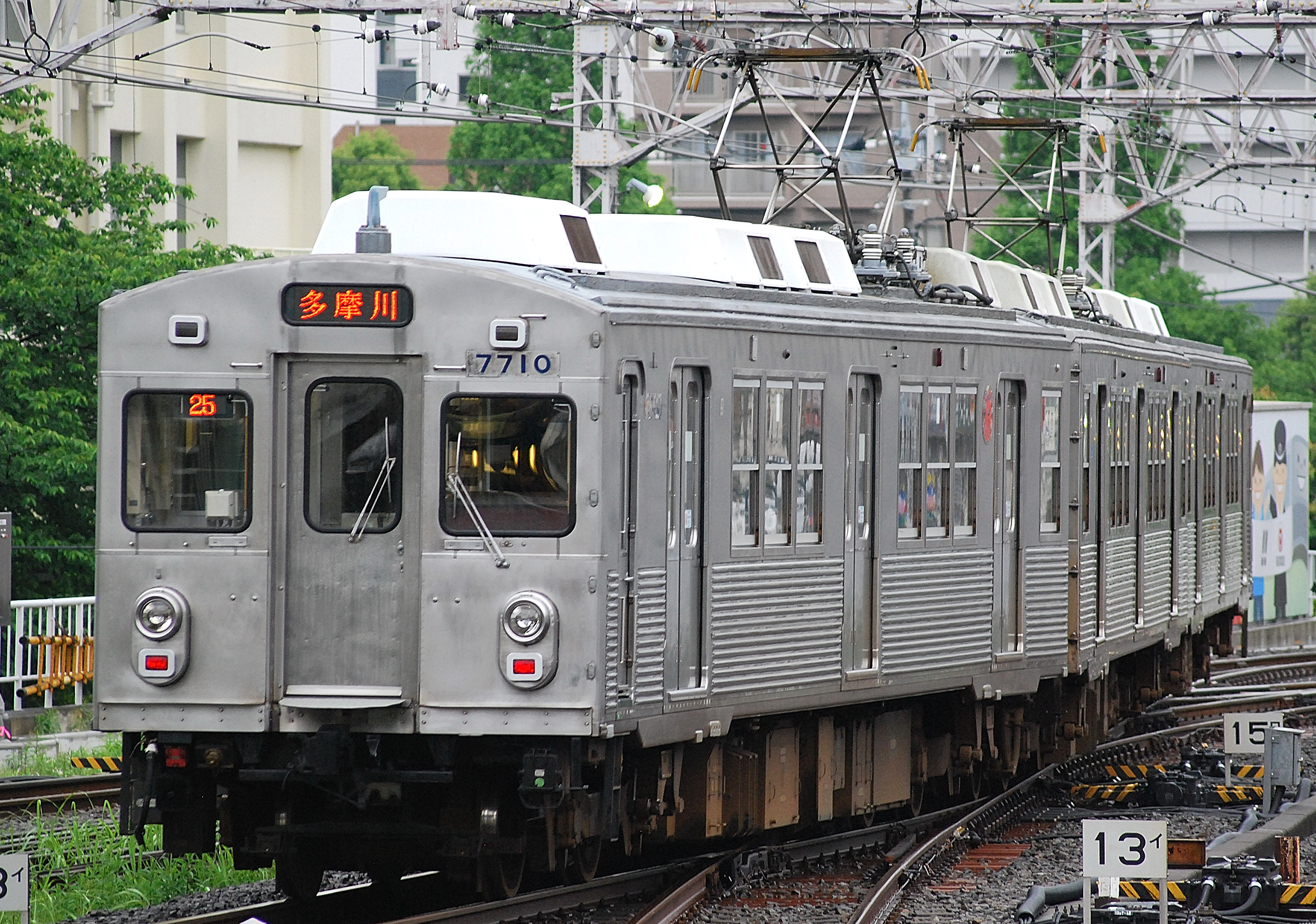
Set 7910 in original unpainted livery in May 2012

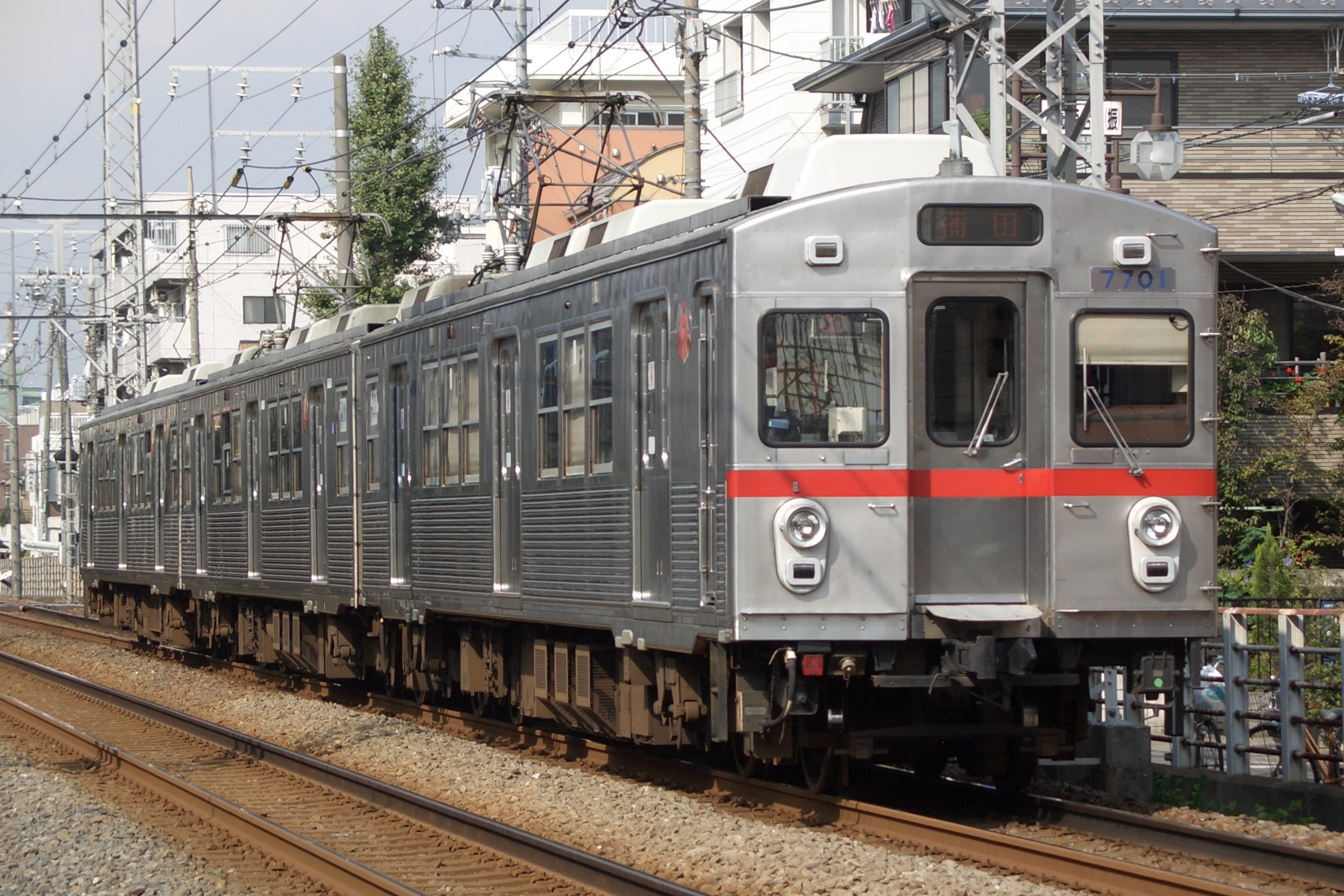
Set 7901 in October 2006

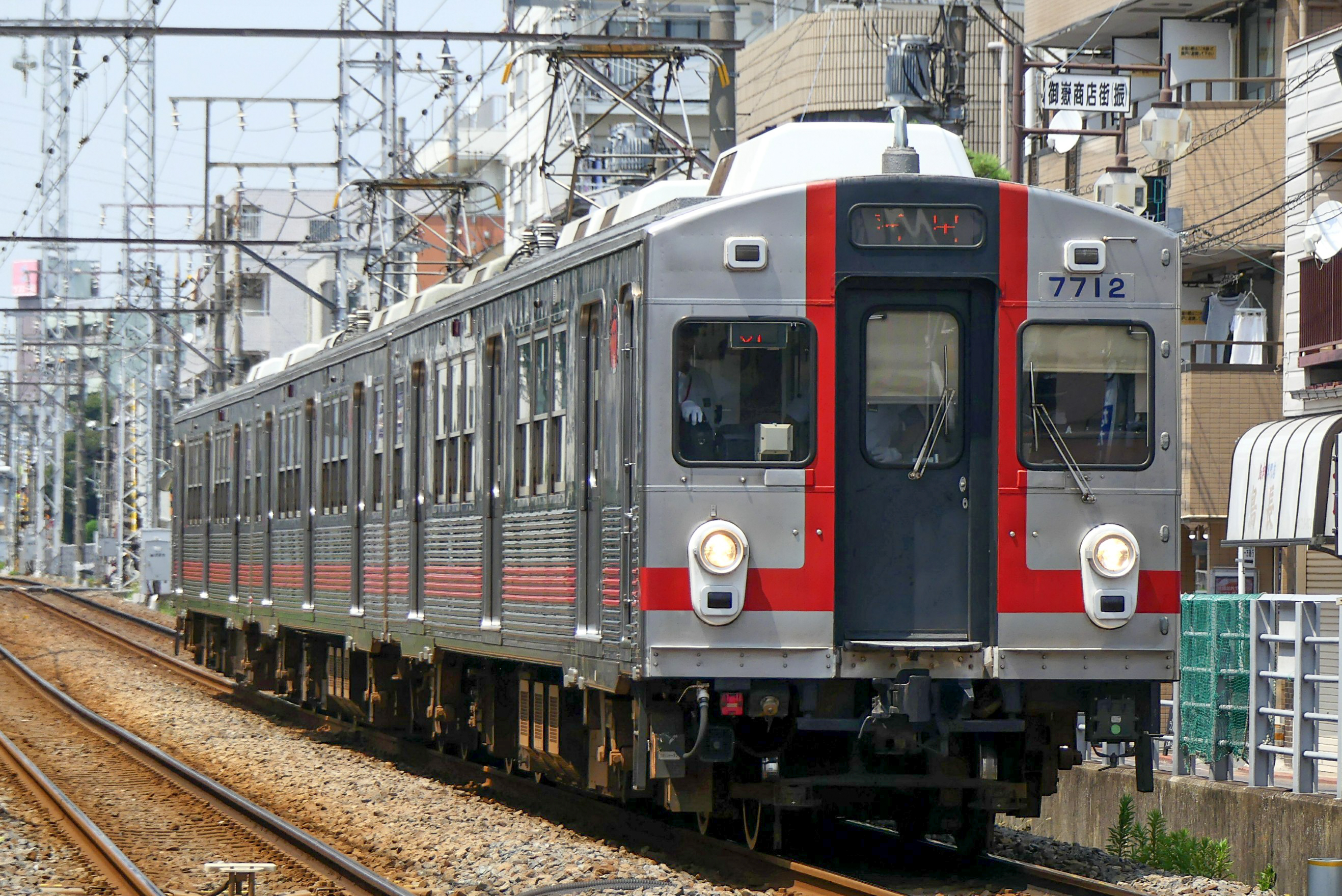
Set 7912 in August 2018 in the "Kabuki" livery applied to driver-only operation sets

== Withdrawal and resale ==
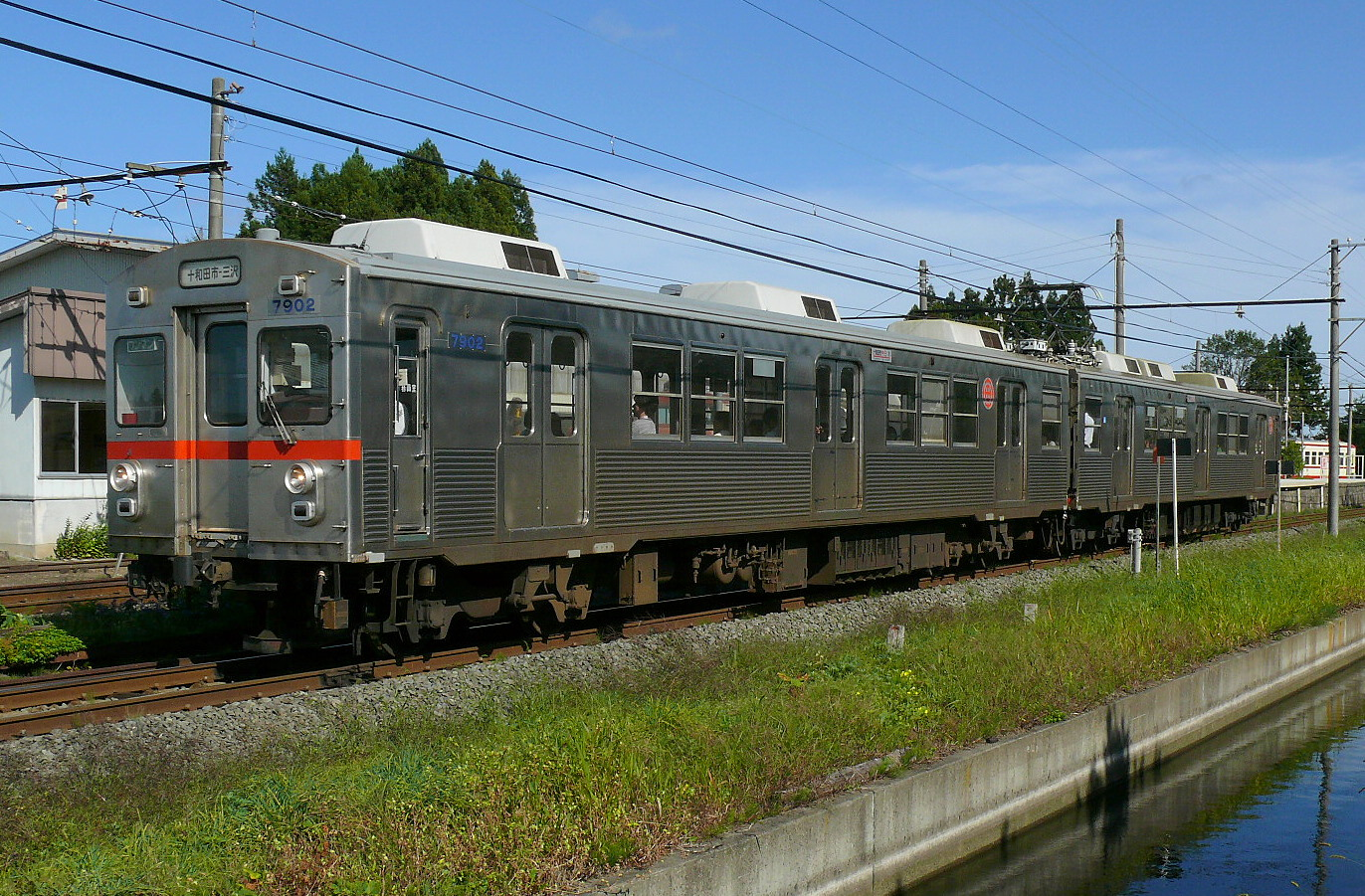
Towada Kanko 7700 series EMU set 7902 in September 2009

Withdrawals commenced in 2000, with six end cars being resold to the Towada Kankō Electric Railway in Aomori Prefecture. While these three two-car sets retained the "7700 series" classification, they were renumbered 7701+7901 to 7703+7903, irrespective of their original car numbers. The 7700 series sets were completely retired on 24 November 2018.

=== Yōrō Railway ===
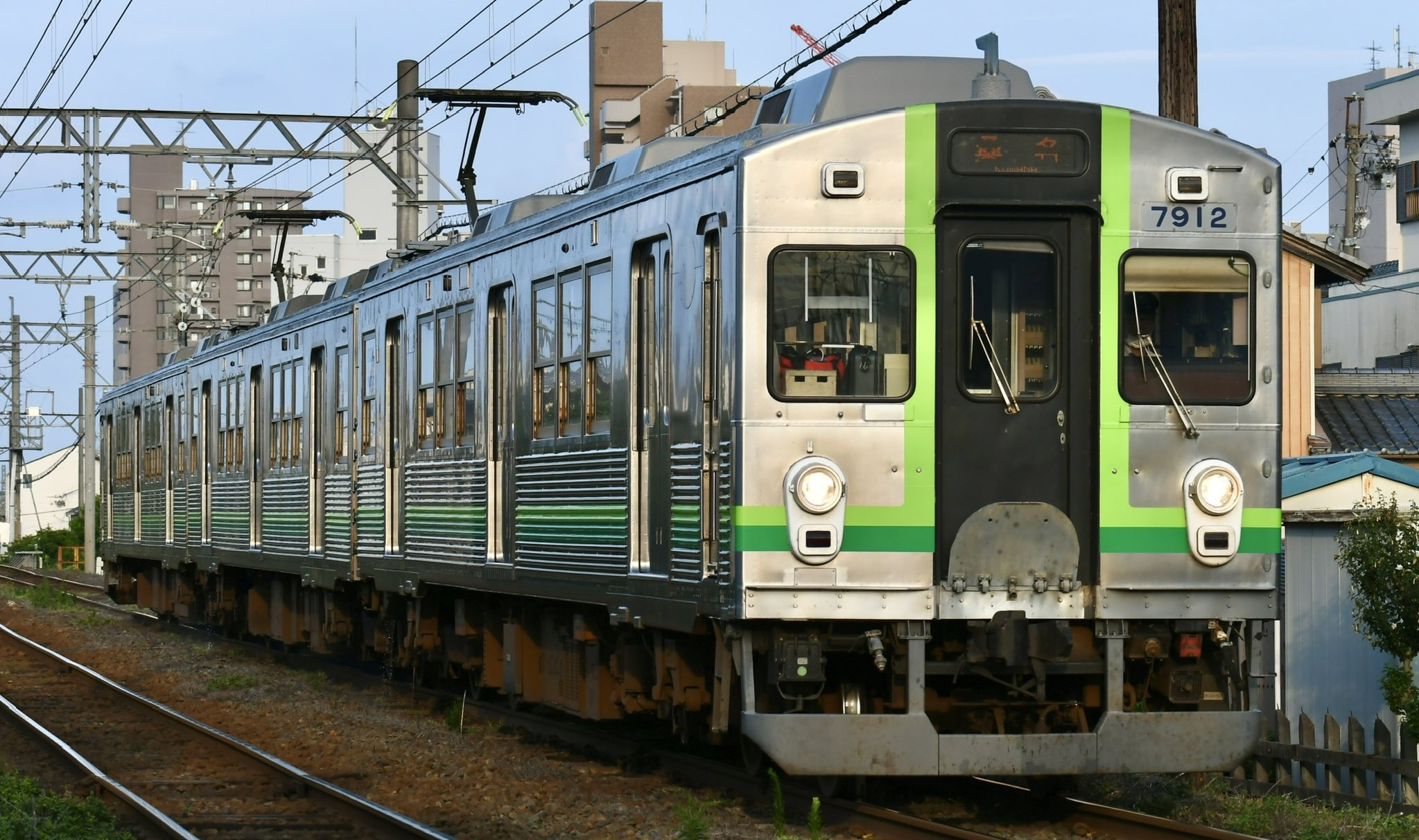
Yōrō Railway 7700 series set TQ12 in green "Kabuki" livery

On 21 August 2018, the Yōrō Railway announced its plans to procure fifteen 7700 series cars to replace nearly half of its 31-vehicle fleet, forming three 3-car sets and three 2-car sets. As part of their transfer, the trains received fareboxes and additional wheelchair spaces, as well as transverse seating bays in the intermediate cars of some 3-car sets. They carry running numbers between TQ01 and TQ14, based on the cars' original numbers.

The Yōrō Railway originally intended to introduce the trains into service in February 2019; however, their introduction was deferred to 27 April 2019, coinciding with the 100th anniversary of the line's completion.

== Preserved examples ==
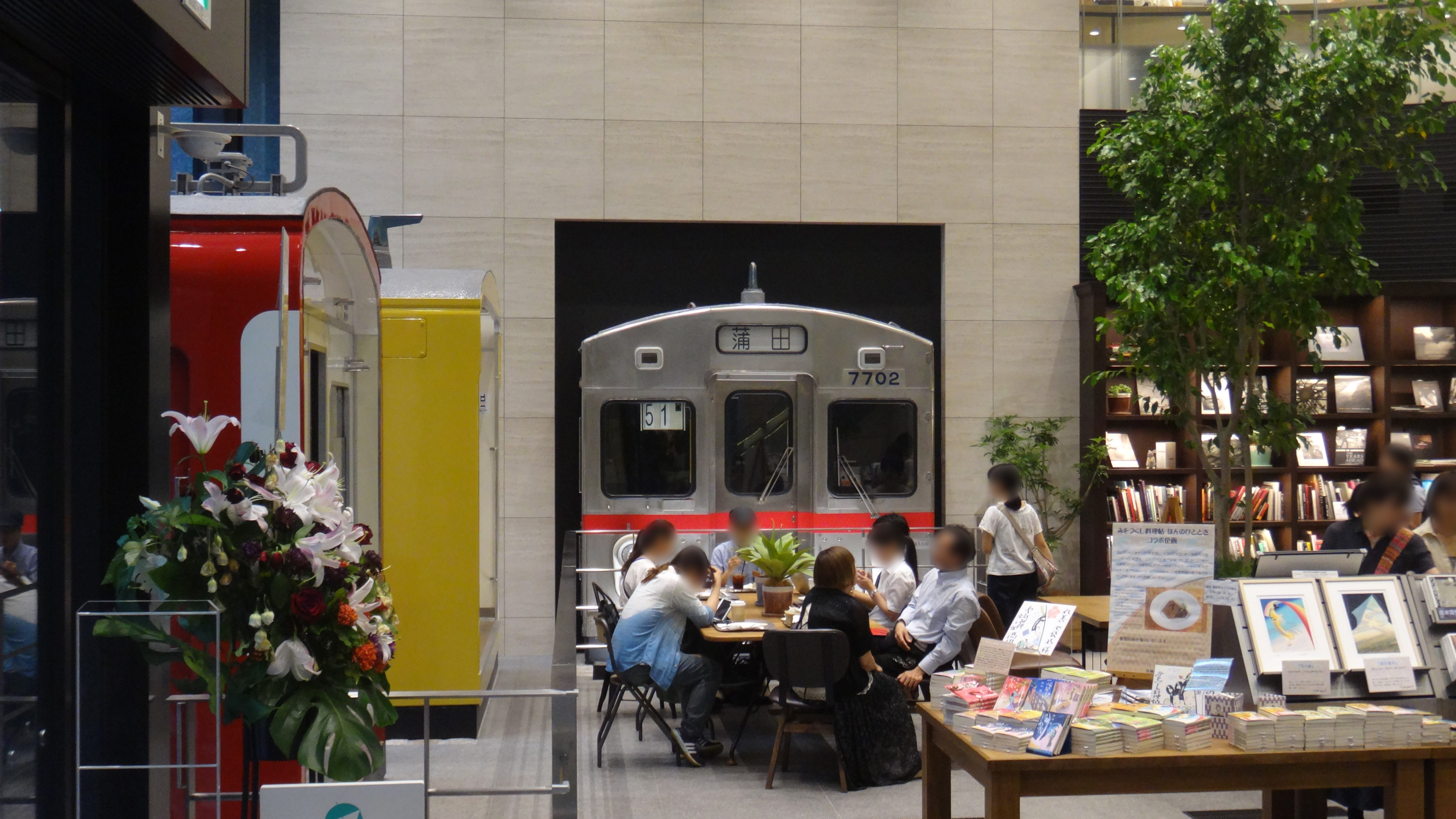
The cab end of former car 7702 preserved inside the Maruzen Ikebukuro bookshop in Tokyo in August 2017

The cab end of former car DeHa 7702 is preserved inside the Maruzen Ikebukuro bookshop in Toshima, Tokyo. Built in March 1966 as 7000 series car DeHa 7046, it was withdrawn in December 2015, and moved to the ground floor of the Maruzen Ikebukuro bookshop building in March 2017, while still under construction.
