= Kamata Station (Tokyo) =

Railway station in Tokyo, Japan

Coordinates: 35°33′43.20″N 139°42′55.92″E

JK17 Kamata Station 蒲田駅

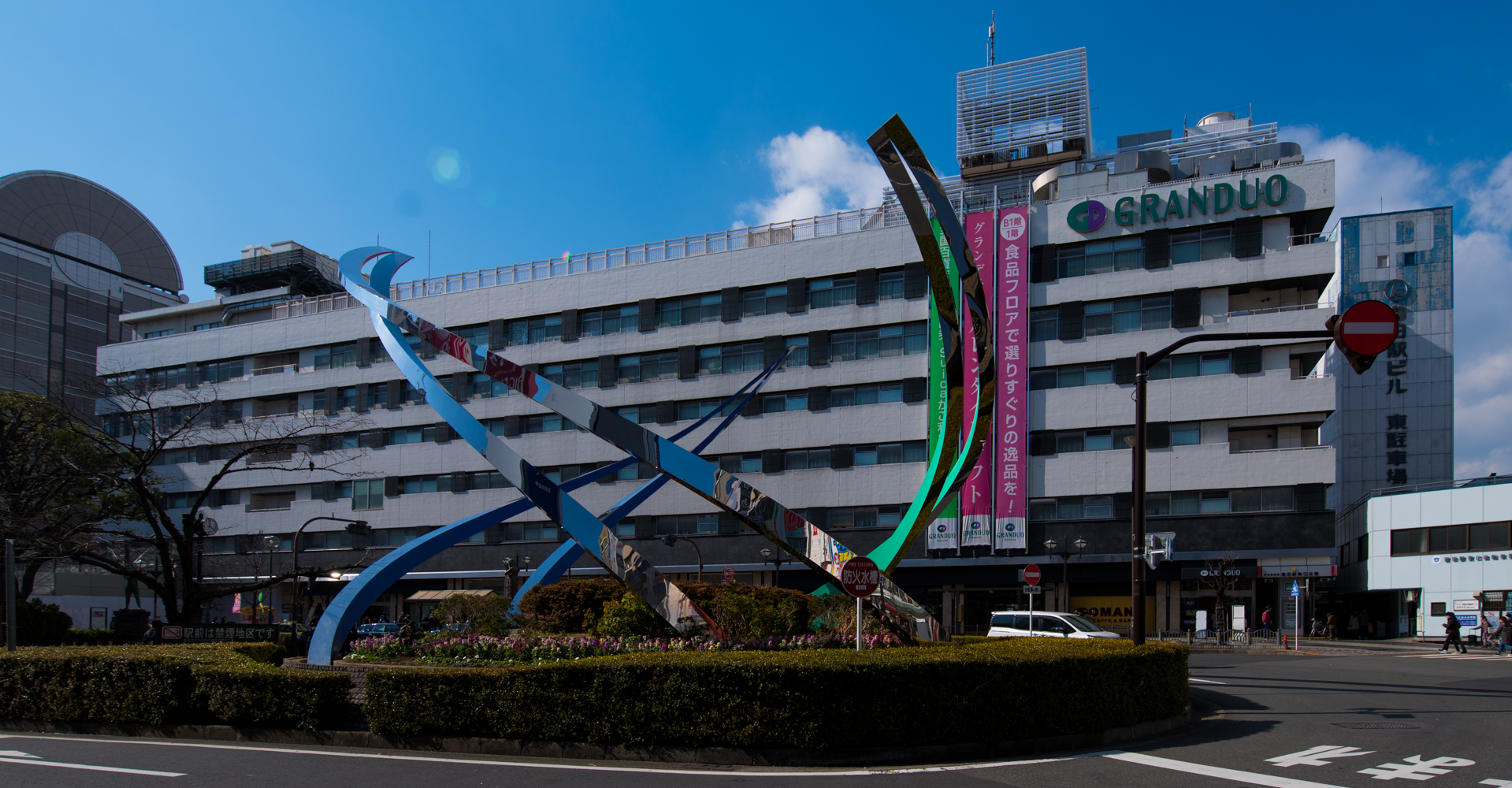
- The station building in February 2018

General information
- Location: Ōta, Tokyo; Japan
- Operator: JR East; Tōkyū Railways
- Lines: Keihin-Tōhoku Line; Tokyu Ikegami Line; Tokyu Tamagawa Line
- Connections: Bus terminal

Other information
- Station code: JK17, IK15, TM07

History
- Opened: 11 April 1904; 122 years ago

Passengers
- JR East, FY2013: 139,728 daily
Services
Preceding station	JR East	Following station
Kawasaki towards Yokohama	Keihin–Tōhoku Line Rapid Local	Ōmori JK18 towards Ōmiya
Preceding station	Tōkyū Railways	Following station
Terminus	Ikegami Line	Hasunuma towards Gotanda
Yaguchinowatashi towards Tamagawa	Tōkyū Tamagawa Line	Terminus
Location
- Location within Special wards of Tokyo Location within Tokyo Bay and Bōsō Peninsula Location within Tokyo Location within Japan

Kamata Station (Japanese: 蒲田駅, romanized: Kamata-eki) is a railway station in Ōta, Tokyo, Japan, operated by the East Japan Railway Company (JR East) and the private railway operator Tokyu Corporation.

== Lines ==
Kamata Station is served by the following lines:

- Keihin-Tohoku Line (JR East)
- Tokyu Tamagawa Line
- Tokyu Ikegami Line

Keikyu Kamata Station on the Keikyu Main Line is located about 700 m to the east of Kamata Station. The Tōkaidō Main Line also runs adjacent to the station on the outer tracks without stopping.

== Station layout ==
=== JR East ===
The JR East station is a surface station with platforms in a north–south direction.

==== Platforms ====
1-2	Keihin-Tohoku Line	for Kawasaki, Yokohama, and Ōfuna
3-4	Keihin-Tohoku Line	for Tokyo, Akabane, and Ōmiya

=== Tokyu ===
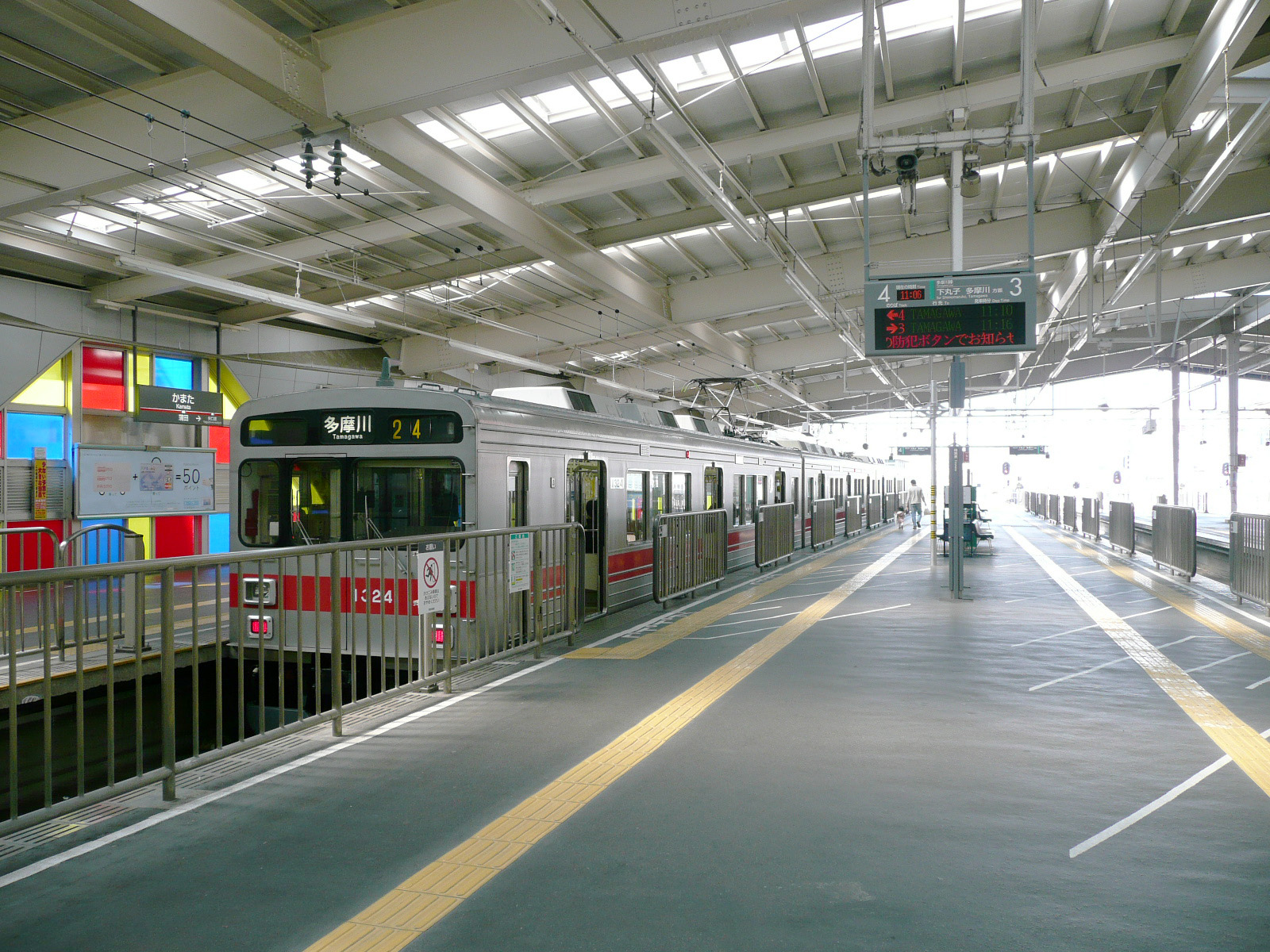
The Tokyu platforms

The Tokyu station is located to the southwest corner of the JR station.

==== Platforms ====
1	Tokyu Ikegami Line	for Ikegami, Yukigaya-Ōtsuka, Hatanodai, and Gotanda
2	Tokyu Ikegami Line	for Ikegami, Yukigaya-Ōtsuka, Hatanodai, and Gotanda
2	Tokyu Tamagawa Line	for Shimo-Maruko and Tamagawa
3-4	Tokyu Tamagawa Line	for Shimo-Maruko and Tamagawa

== History ==
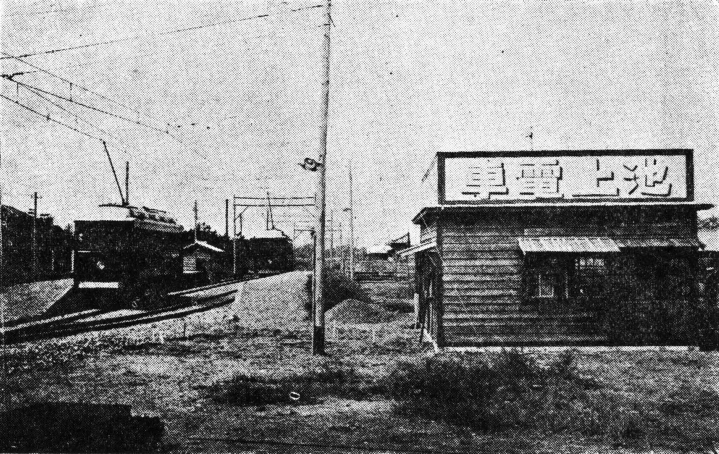
The station in the 1920s.

The JR East station opened on 11 April 1904. The Tokyu station opened on 6 October 1922 on the Ikegami Line, and services on Tamagawa Line began on 1 November 1923.

== Future plans ==
Plans exist to build a Kama-Kama Line that would extend the Tokyu Tamagawa Line from Kamata eastward by approximately 800 m to Keikyu Kamata Station on the Keikyu Main Line and Keikyu Airport Line. This would provide an interchange between the lines, improving accessibility to Tokyo's Haneda Airport ahead of the 2020 Summer Olympics. As of June 2022, Ōta Ward has agreed with the Tokyo Metropolitan Government to pay 70% of the project cost of ¥136 billion (2021) (equivalent to ¥147.89 billion or US$977.06 million in 2024) while having the city government responsible for the remaining 30%.

== Passenger statistics ==
In fiscal 2013, the JR East station was used by an average of 139,728 passengers daily (boarding passengers only), making it the nineteenth-busiest station operated by JR East. Over the same fiscal year the Tōkyū Ikegami and Tamagawa Line stations were used by an average of 69,464 and 88,102 passengers daily respectively (entering and exiting passengers).

The passenger figures for previous years are as shown below.

Fiscal year	JR East	Tokyu	
Fiscal year	JR East	Ikegami Line	Tamagawa Line
2000	129,724		
2005	131,947	64,664	82,890
2010	133,748	67,873	84,399
2011	133,593	67,171	84,269
2012	135,668	68,143	85,300
2013	139,728	69,464	88,102

- Note that JR East figures are for boarding passengers only.

== Surrounding area ==
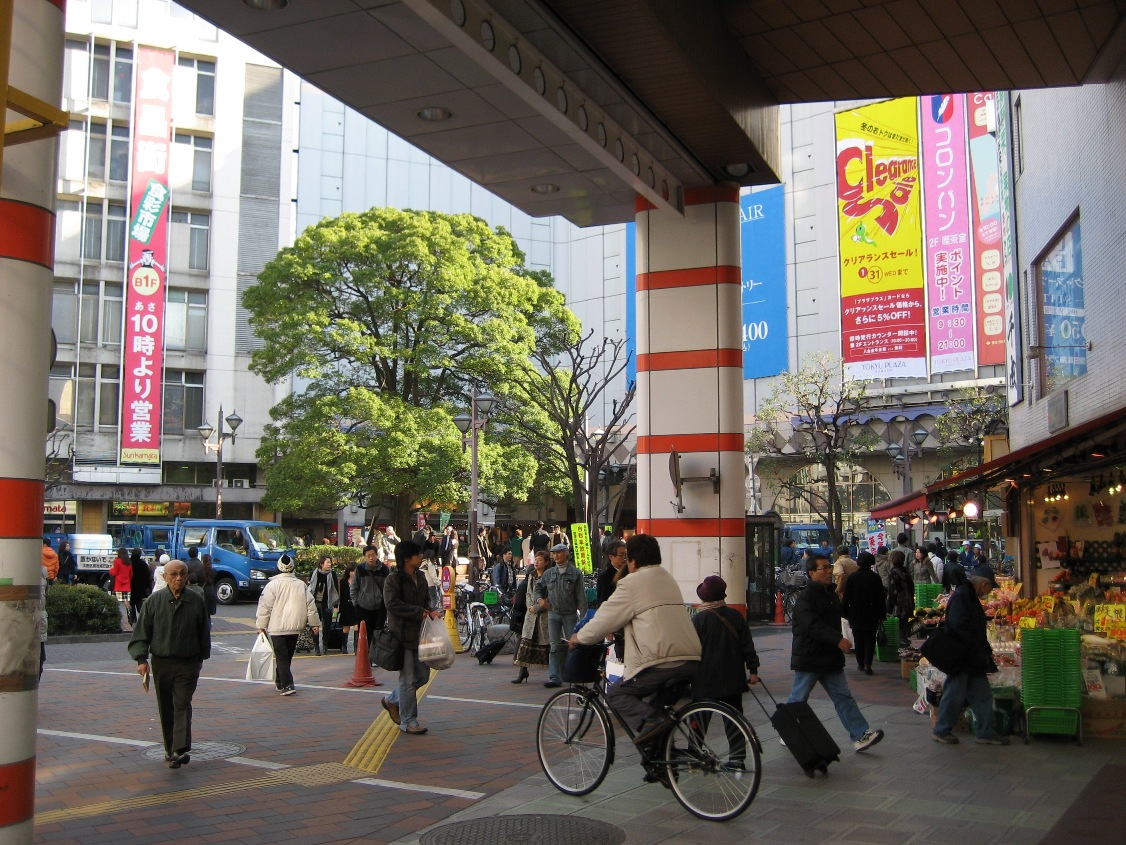
Area near Kamata Station

- Keikyu Kamata Station (Keikyu Main Line)
- Kamata Mosque

== See also ==
- List of railway stations in Japan
