= Tamagawa Station (Tokyo) =

Railway station in Tokyo, Japan

Coordinates: 35°35′23″N 139°40′08″E

Tamagawa Station 多摩川駅

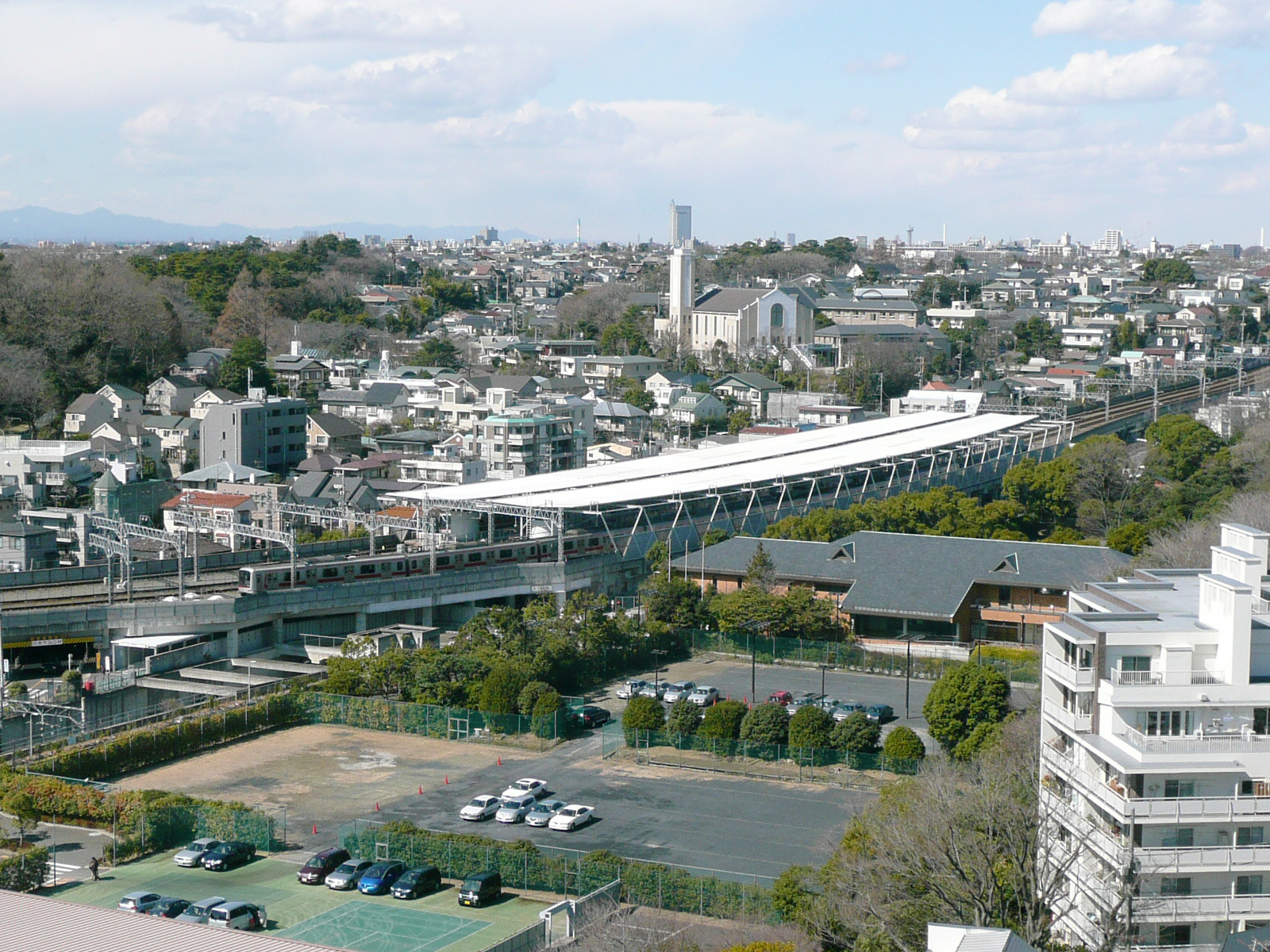
- Bird's-eye view of the station

General information
- Location: Ōta, Tokyo; Japan
- Operator: Tokyu Corporation
- Lines: Tōyoko Line; Meguro Line; Tōkyū Tamagawa Line
- Platforms: 3 island platforms
- Tracks: 6

Construction
- Structure type: Elevated and Underground

Other information
- Station code: TY09, MG09, TM01

History
- Opened: 11 March 1923; 103 years ago
Services
Preceding station	Tōkyū Railways	Following station
Musashi-kosugi towards Yokohama	Tōyoko Line Express	Den-en-chōfu towards Shibuya
Shin-maruko towards Yokohama	Tōyoko Line Local	Den-en-chōfu towards Shibuya
Musashi-kosugi towards Hiyoshi	Meguro Line Express	Den-en-chōfu towards Meguro
Shin-maruko towards Hiyoshi	Meguro Line Local	Den-en-chōfu towards Meguro
Terminus	Tōkyū Tamagawa Line	Numabe towards Kamata
Location
- Location within Special wards of Tokyo Location within Tokyo Bay and Bōsō Peninsula Location within Tokyo Location within Japan

Tamagawa Station (多摩川駅, Tamagawa-eki) is a train station in Ōta, Tokyo, Japan, operated by the private railway operator Tokyu Corporation.

== Lines ==
Tamagawa Station is served by the following three lines.

- Tokyu Toyoko Line (TY09)
- Tokyu Meguro Line (MG09)
- Tokyu Tamagawa Line (TM01)

== Station layout ==
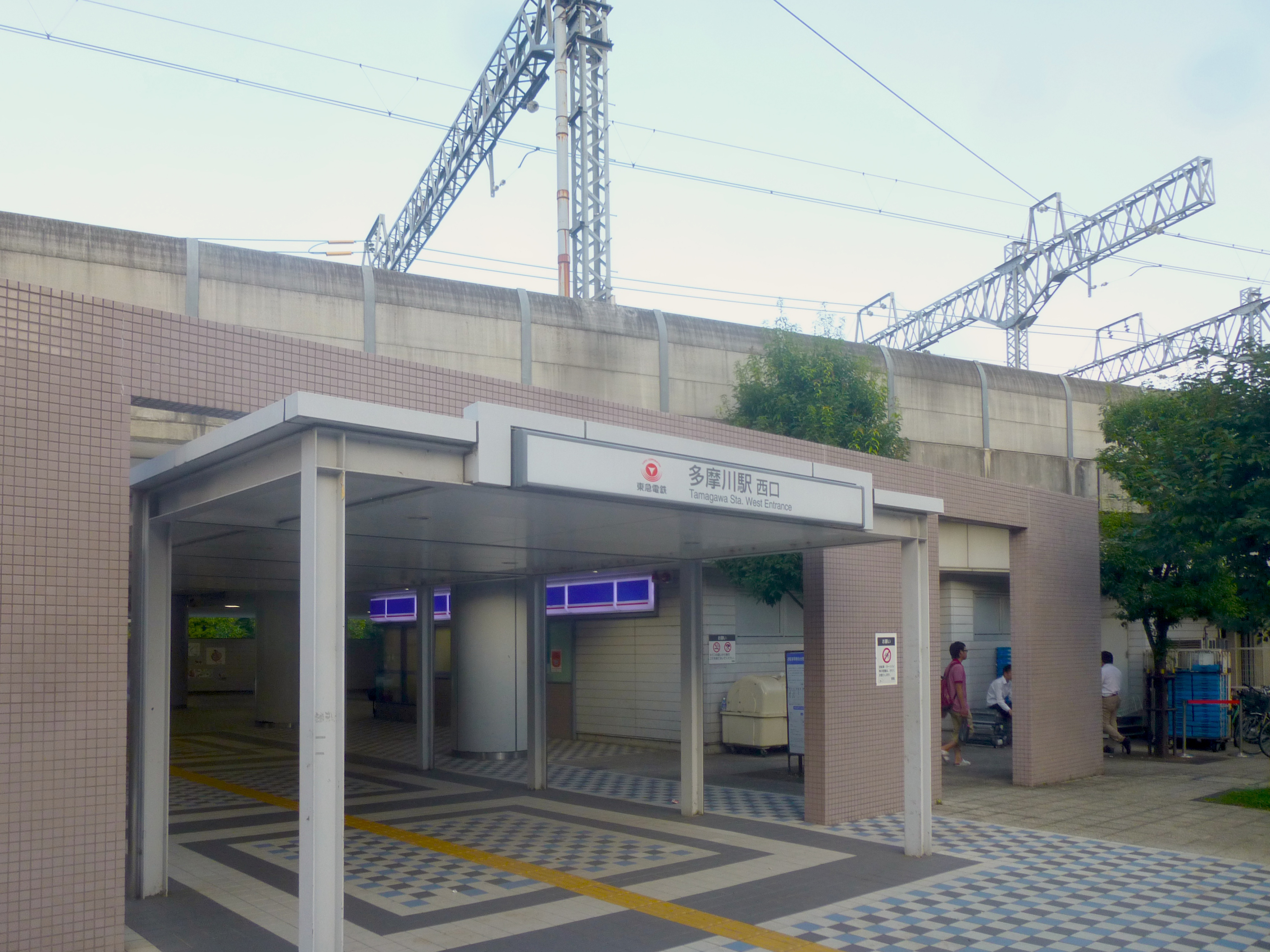
The west exit, August 2013

There are two levels. The high level station serves the Toyoko and Meguro lines, while the underground station is the terminus of the Tokyu Tamagawa Line. The upper level is an elevated station with two island platforms serving four tracks. The lower level has one island platform serving two tracks.

=== Platforms ===
1
Tokyu Toyoko Line
- for Musashi-Kosugi, Kikuna, and Yokohama
- Minatomirai Line for Motomachi-Chūkagai
- Sōtetsu Izumino Line for Shōnandai via the Tōkyū/Sōtetsu Shin-yokohama Line
2
Tokyu Meguro Line
- for Musashi-Kosugi and Hiyoshi
- Tōkyū Shin-yokohama Line for Shin-Yokohama
- Sōtetsu Main Line for Ebina via the Tōkyū/Sōtetsu Shin-yokohama Line
3
Tokyu Meguro Line
for Ōokayama and Meguro
Namboku Line for Akabane-iwabuchi
Saitama Rapid Railway Line for Urawa-misono
Mita Line for Nishi-takashimadaira
4
Tokyu Toyoko Line
for Jiyūgaoka, Naka-Meguro, and Shibuya
Fukutoshin Line for Shinjuku-sanchome, Ikebukuro, Kotake-mukaihara, and Wakoshi
Seibu Ikebukuro Line for Hannō
Tōbu Tōjō Line for Shinrin-kōen
5,6
Tokyu Tamagawa Line
for Kamata

== History ==
The station opened on 11 March 1923.

== Surrounding area ==
- Tamagawadai Park
- Denenchofu Catholic Church
- Nishimoriinari shrine
- Former Tama playing ground of the Yomiuri Giants baseball team
- Maruko bridge
