= Nyūdōzaki Lighthouse =

Nyudozaki Lighthouse 入道埼灯台
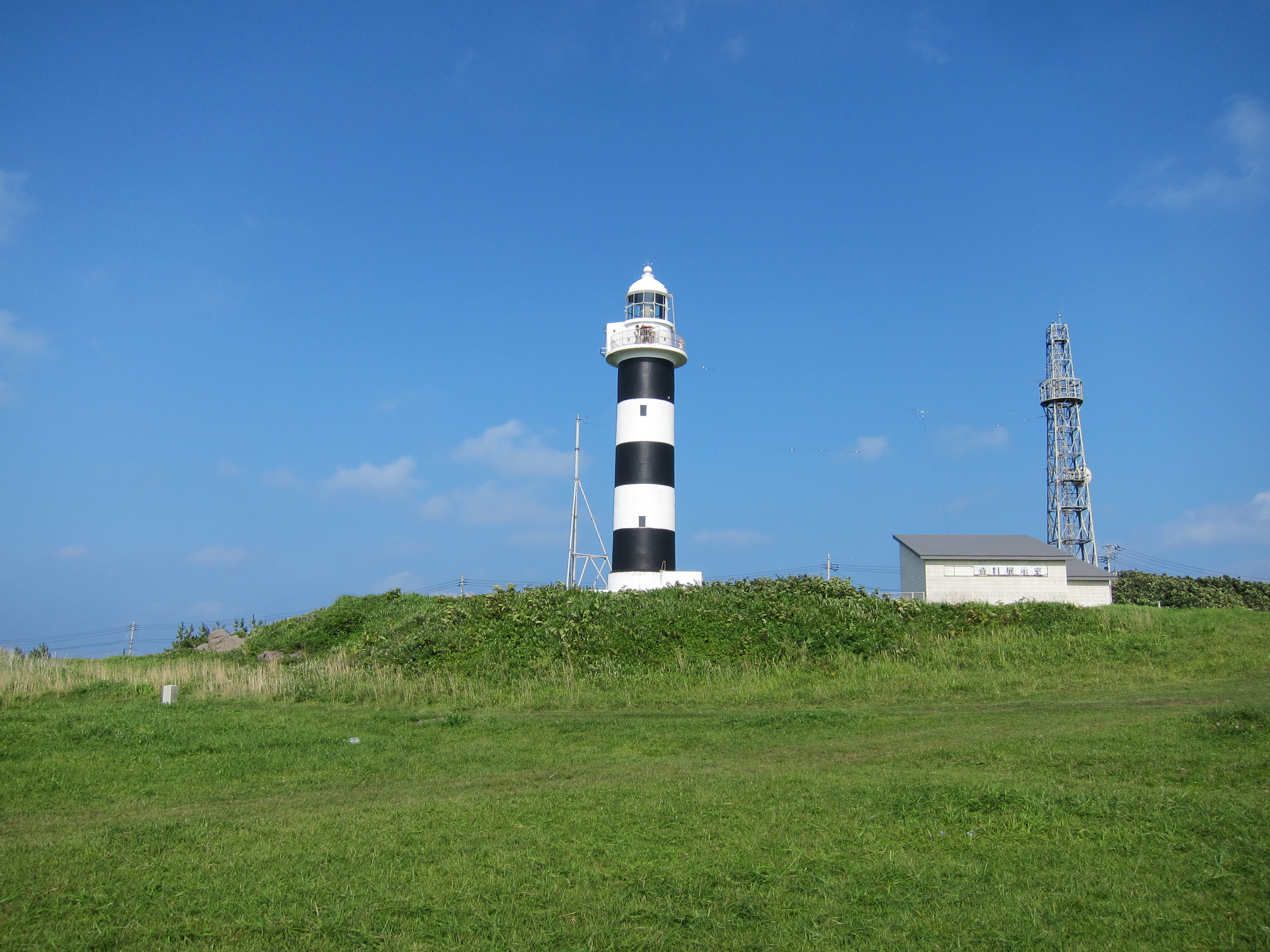
- Location: Oga; Akita Prefecture; Japan
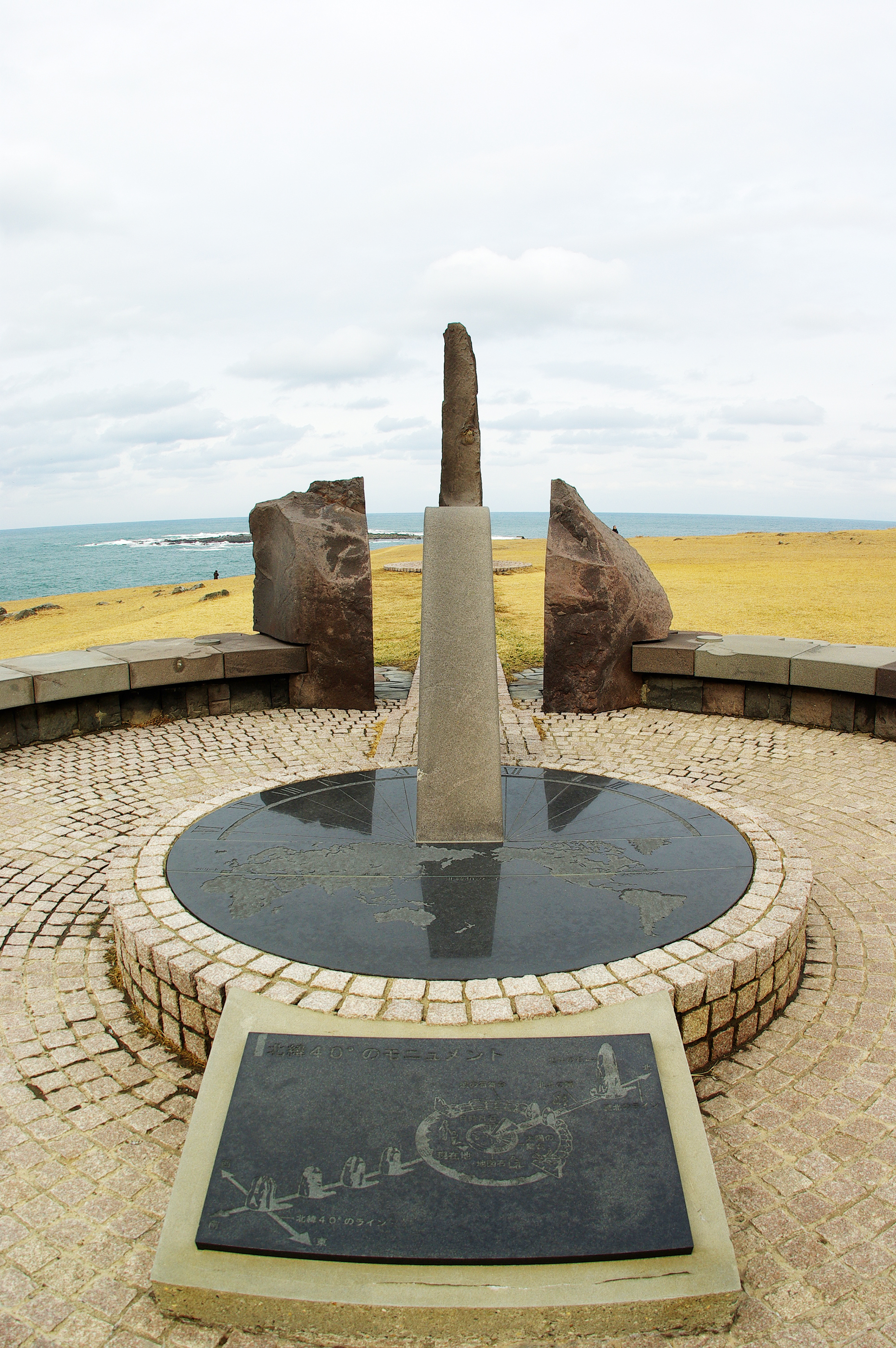
- Coordinates: 40°00′18″N 139°42′6″E

Tower
- Constructed: 8 November 1898 (first)
- Foundation: concrete
- Construction: concrete tower
- Automated: May 1972
- Height: 27.92 metres (91.6 ft)
- Shape: cylindrical tower with balcony and lantern
- Markings: white and black bands tower, white lantern

Light
- First lit: 1951 (current)
- Focal height: 57.00 metres (187.01 ft)
- Lens: Second-order Fresnel
- Intensity: 1,500,000 cd
- Range: 20.0 nautical miles (37.0 km; 23.0 mi)
- Characteristic: Fl W 15s.
- Japan no.: JCG-1414 (main light) and 1415 (spotlight)

Nyudozaki Lighthouse (入道崎灯台, Nyūdōzaki tōdai), or Nyūdō Saki Lighthouse, is a lighthouse on the northwest top of Oga Peninsula in the city of Oga, Akita Prefecture, Japan.

== History ==
The first lighthouse was built in 1898, a white hexagon 24.4 meter steel tower. It was electrified with a 1,500W lamp in 1932 and manned until 1972, when it transitioned to automatic control. From 1973 Nyudozaki carries a continuous white spotlight that shines on the Mizushima Islet about 1,000 meters to the north. It is currently one of the 16 Japanese lighthouses which is open to the public, who may climb to the top for a panoramic view over the Sea of Japan (not available in winter season). A small museum has been attached since 1998 displaying references and lenses. The tower is listed as one of the “50 Lighthouses of Japan” by the Japan Lighthouse Association and operated by the 2nd Regional Coast Guard Headquarters.

== Gallery ==
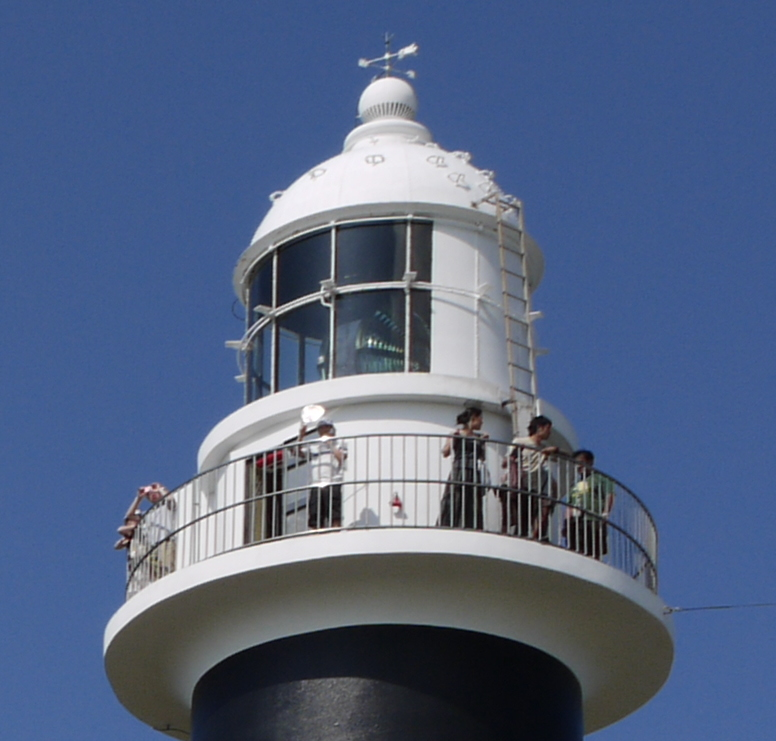
Visitors on the observatory

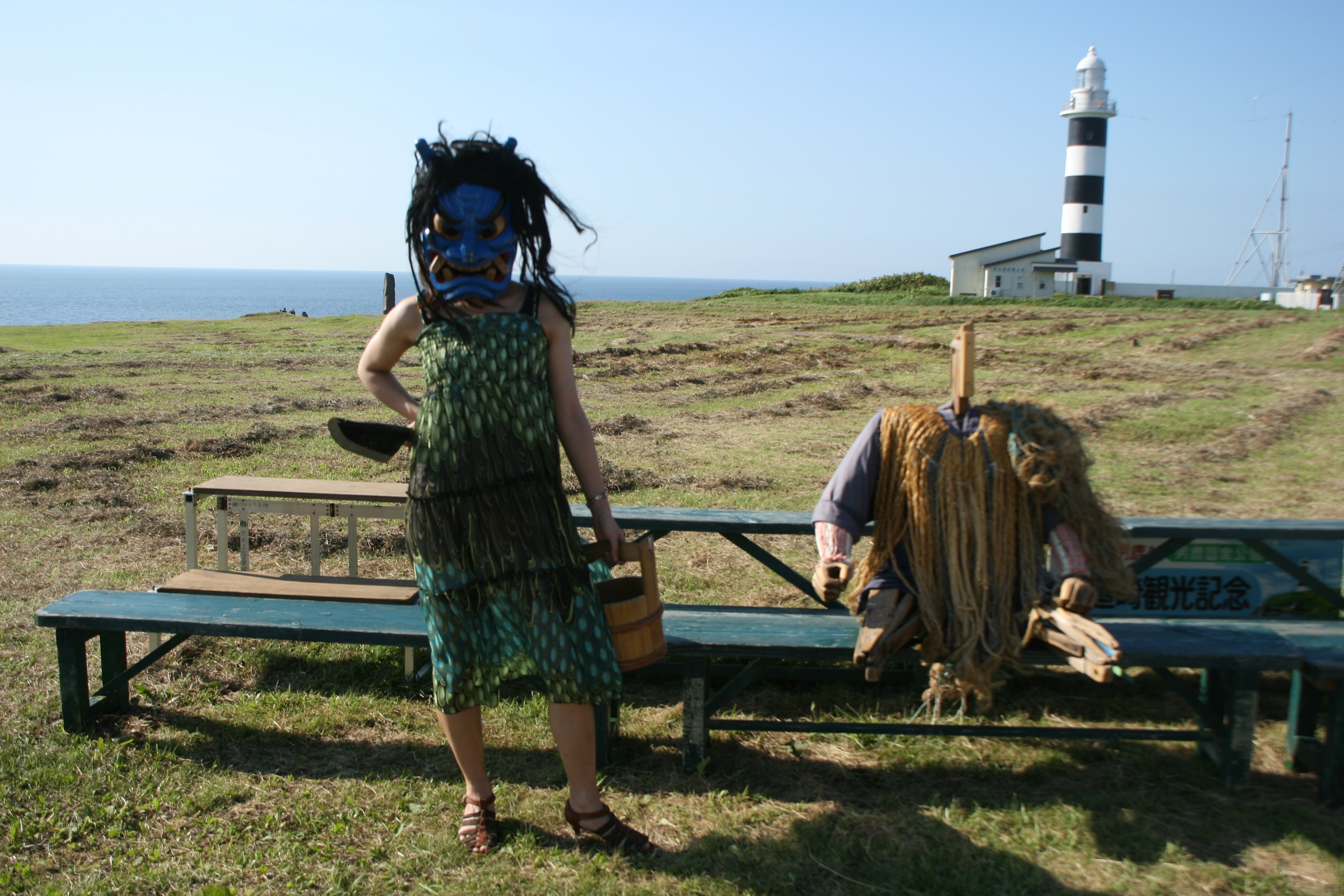
Namahage masked woman and the tower

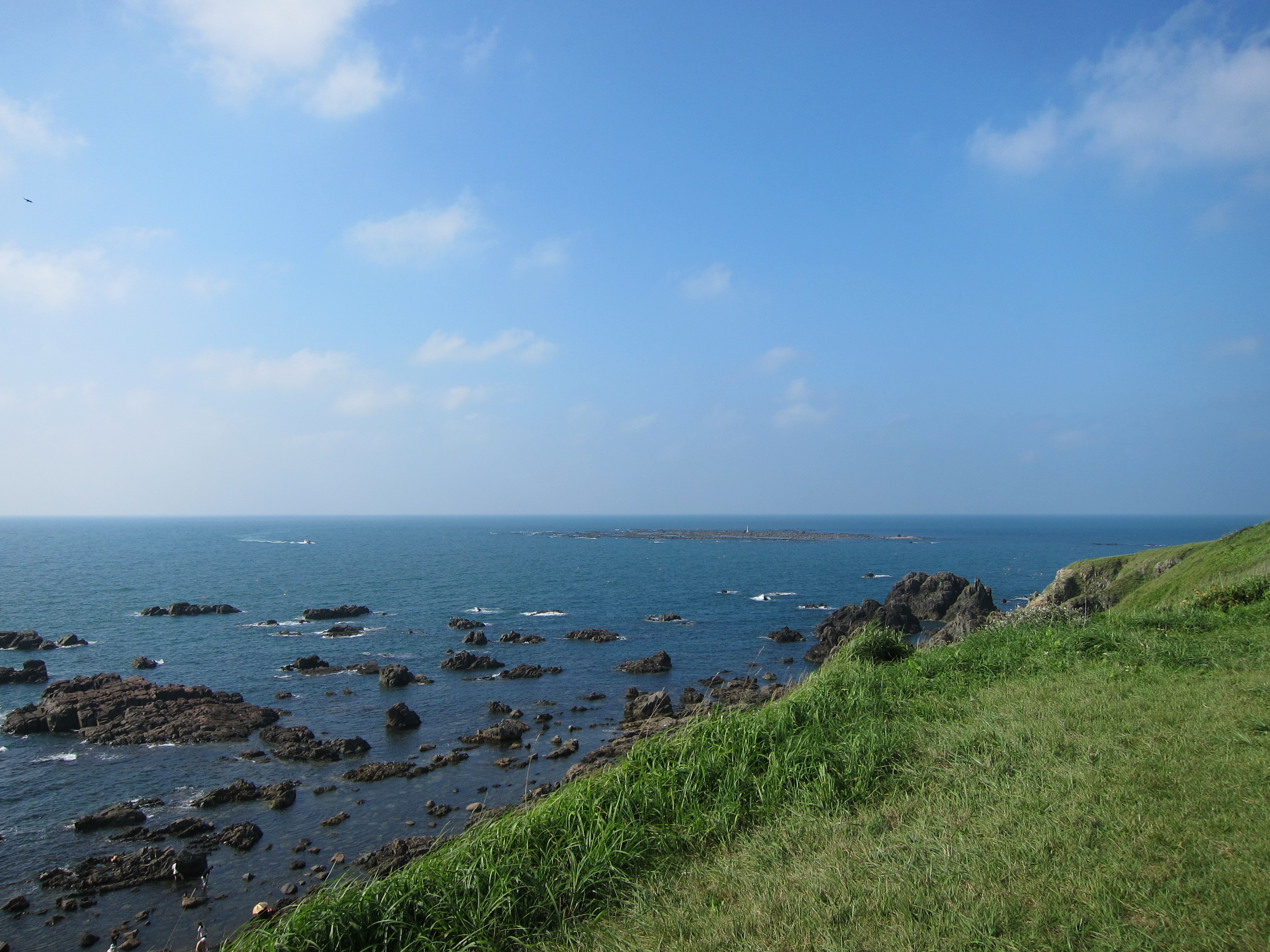
Mizushima Islet

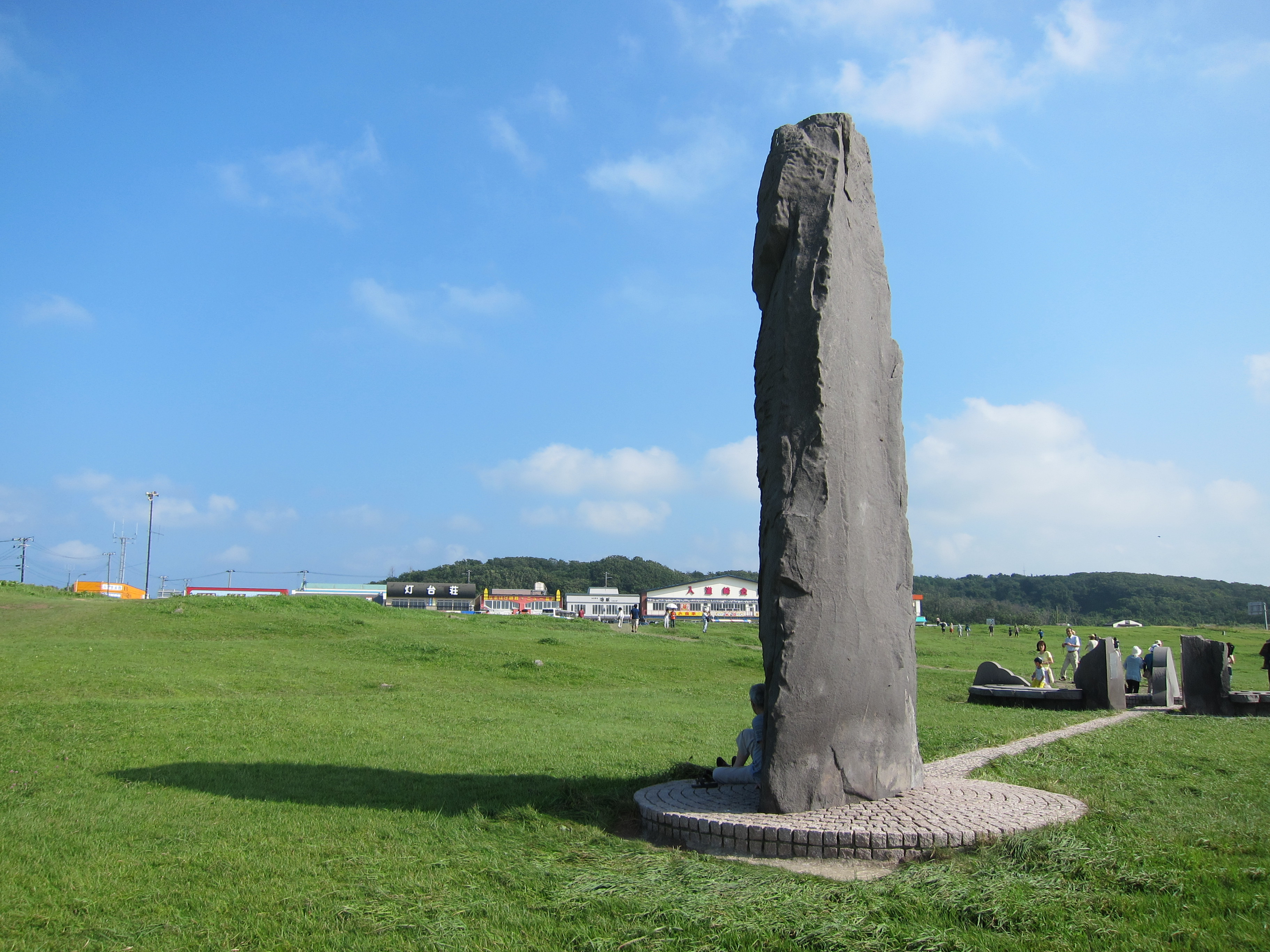
Latitude N40th Monument

== See also ==
- List of lighthouses in Japan
- Oga Aquarium Gao
- Oga Quasi-National Park
