= Mino (straw cape) =

Traditional Japanese straw raincoat

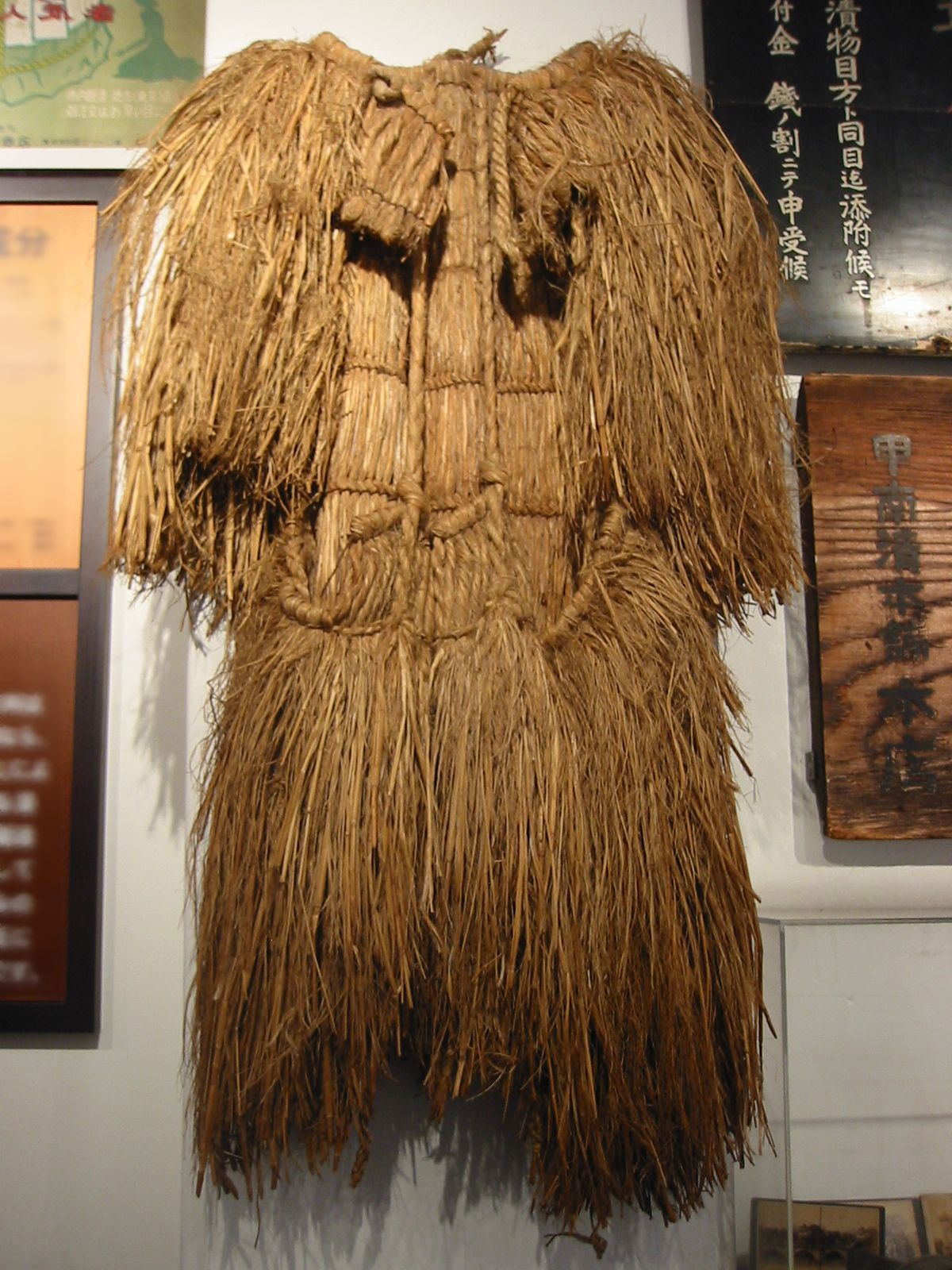
A mino straw cape

A mino (蓑) is a traditional Japanese raincoat made out of straw, originally invented in China. Traditional mino are an article of outerwear covering the entire body, although shorter ones resembling grass skirts were also historically used to cover the lower body alone. Similar straw capes were also used in China, Vietnam and Korea.

== Overview ==
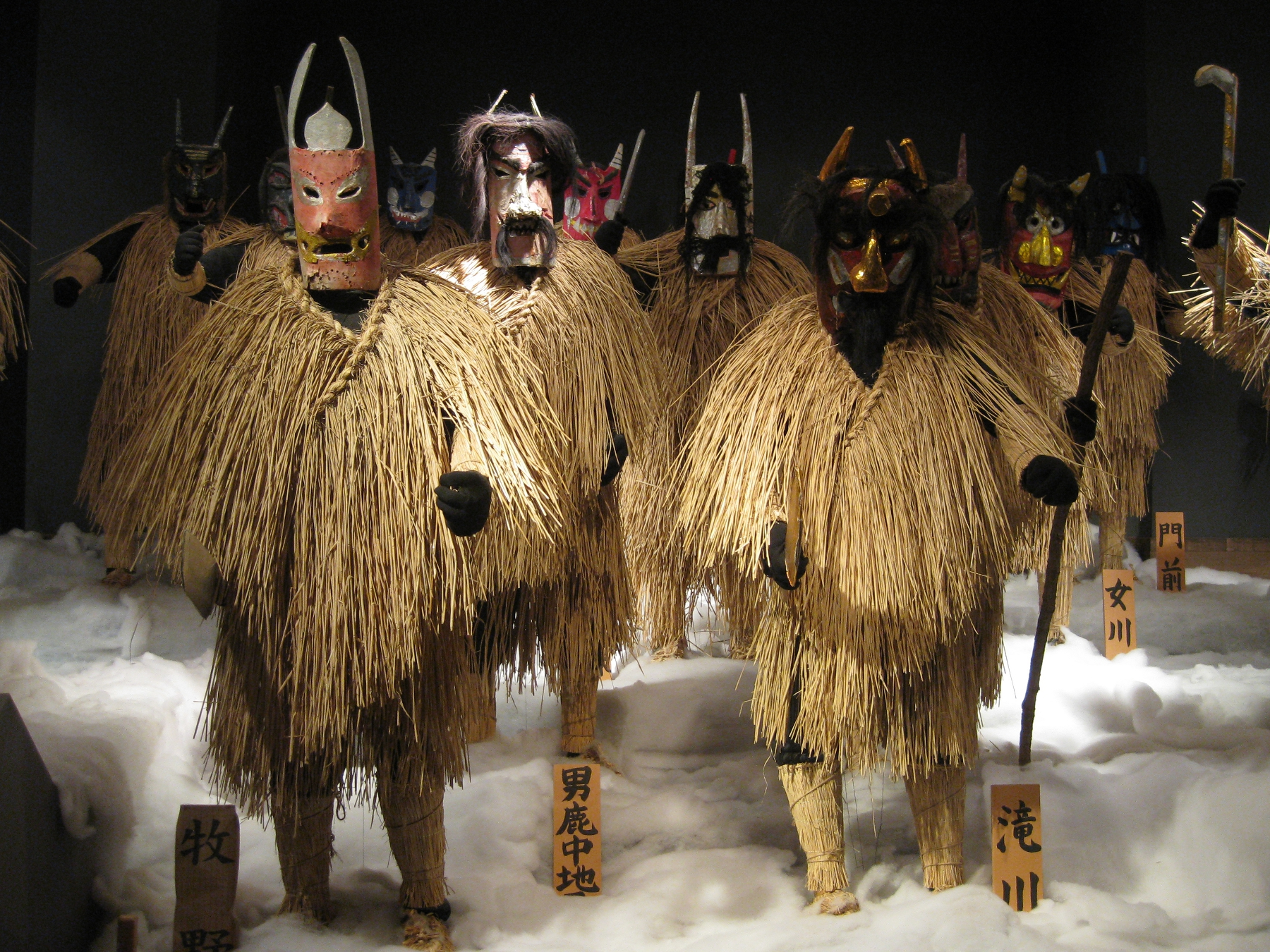
Several namahage wearing outfits incorporating mino.

Rice straw has naturally water-repellent properties, with water droplets that hit a mat of straw tending to flow along the length of the fibres, rather than penetrating underneath it. For this reason, early Japanese rain gear was often made of straw, which had the added benefit of being cheap to acquire, easy to weave and fasten, and being light in weight; however, this rain gear was also bulky in size, and highly flammable. In earlier eras, straw clothing had the additional advantage of affording a significant degree of camouflage in certain terrain, including forests and wetlands, similar to modern ghillie suits.

As synthetic fibers and later plastics were introduced to Japan, mino lost much of their practicality and fell out of use. Today, however, they are still worn as costumes in various traditional folk traditions and festivals, such as the New Year celebrations of the Oga Peninsula, where men dress as ogre-like namahage wearing masks and mino. Mino are also seen in some kabuki plays.

== Popular culture ==
Sarumino (猿蓑, "The Monkey's Raincoat") is a 1691 anthology of Bashō-school poetry. It is widely considered to be one of the most important compilations of classical Japanese verse.

The bagworm Pokémon, Burmy, is called Minomucchi (ミノムッチ) in Japanese, which is a portmanteau of ミノムシ (minomushi), the Japanese word for bagworm, and the Japanese suffix -cchi, which denotes a cute nickname. Minomushi itself is a portmanteau of mino and mushi, meaning "bug". This means that Burmy's Japanese name roughly translates to mean "a cutie in a straw coat".

The Ice-type Pokémon Snorunt is based on a yukinko, a Japanese folklore spirit from the snow, which also wears a mino.

The sound ninja from Naruto Dosu Kinuta wears a mino on his shoulders.

== See also ==
- Asian conical hat
- Straw hat
- Thatching
