= Oga Athletic Stadium =

Multi-purpose stadium in Oga, Akita, Japan

- 男鹿市陸上競技場

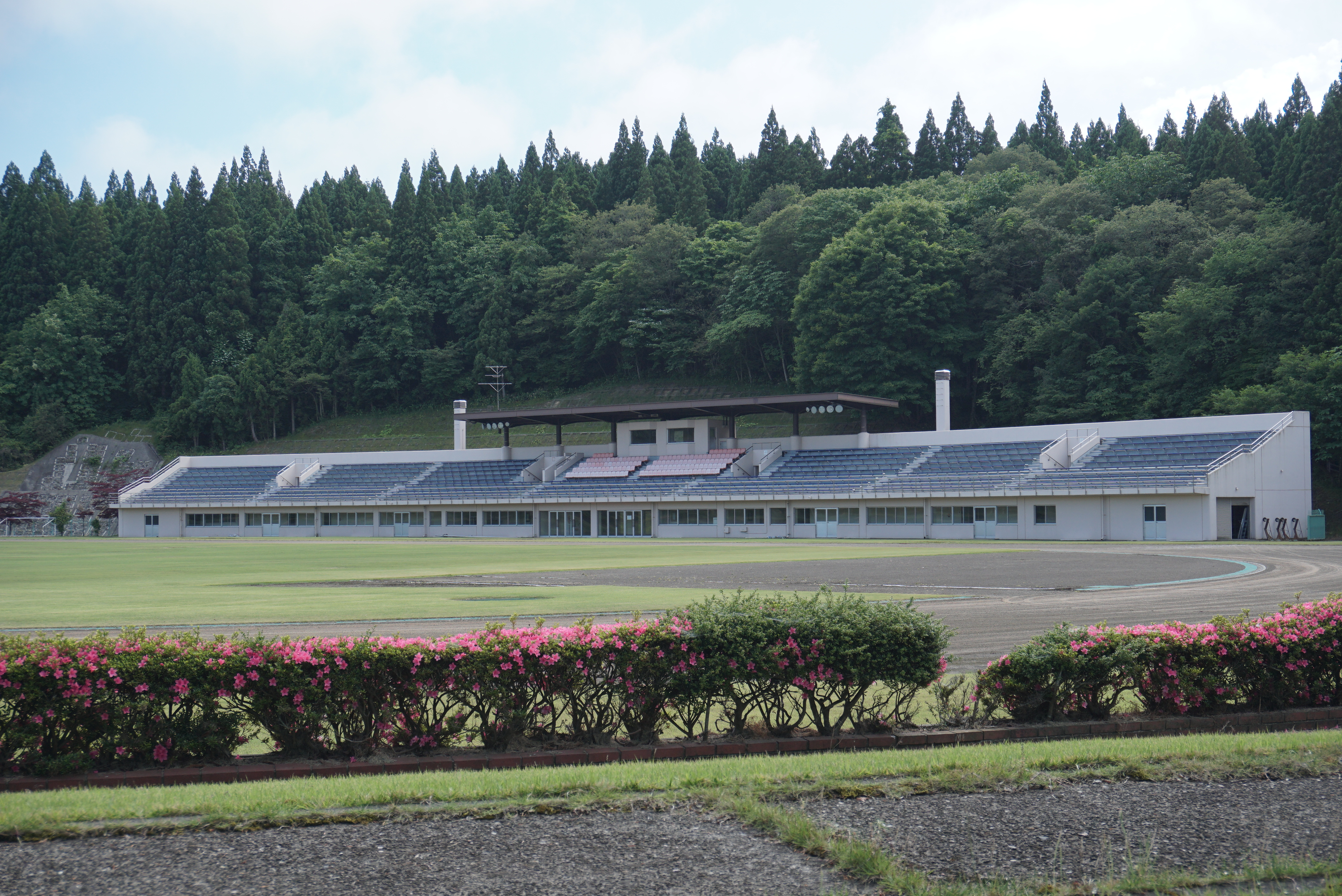

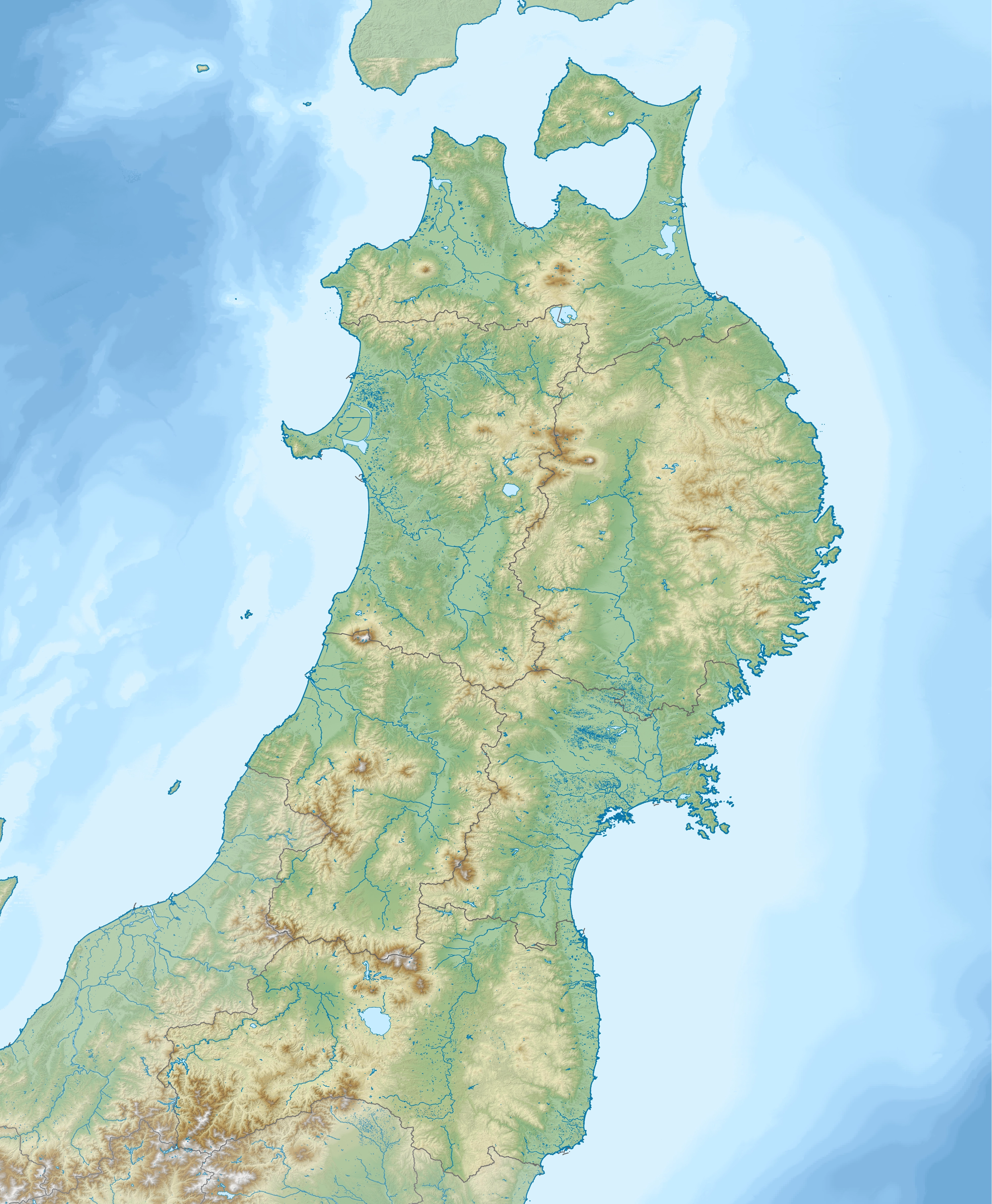
- Location within Akita Prefecture Location within Tohoku, Japan Location within Japan
- Interactive map of Oga Athletic Stadium
- Full name: Oga City Athletic Stadium
- Location: 304 Osawata, Hidume, Funagawa-minato, Oga, Akita, Japan
- Coordinates: 39°54′37.8″N 139°51′7.7″E
- Owner: City of Oga
- Operator: City of Oga
- Capacity: 9,000
- Surface: Turf
- Acreage: 22,690 m^{2}
- Public transit: JR Hadachi Station

Construction
- Opened: 2005

Tenant
- Blaublitz Akita

Website
- www.oga-taikyo.com

Oga City Athletic Stadium (男鹿市陸上競技場) is a multi-purpose stadium at the Oga General Sports Park in Oga, Akita, Japan. The stadium was originally opened in 2005 and has a capacity of 9,000 spectators. It is one of the former home grounds of Blaublitz Akita, and hosted the National Sports Festival of Japan in 2007.

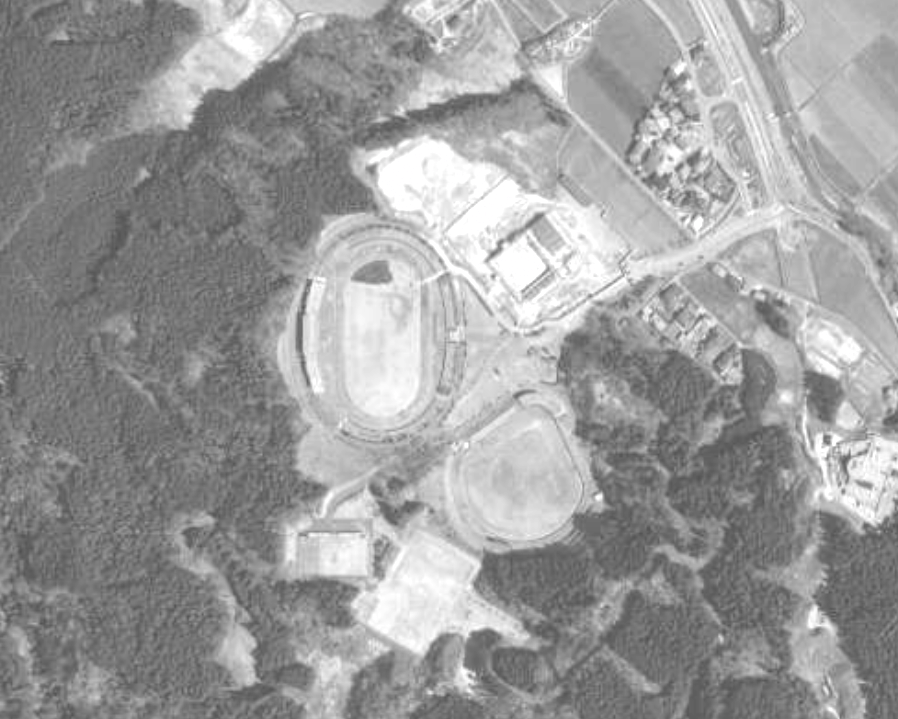
Oga Sports Park in 2004
