= Oga, Akita =

Oga 男鹿市
- City
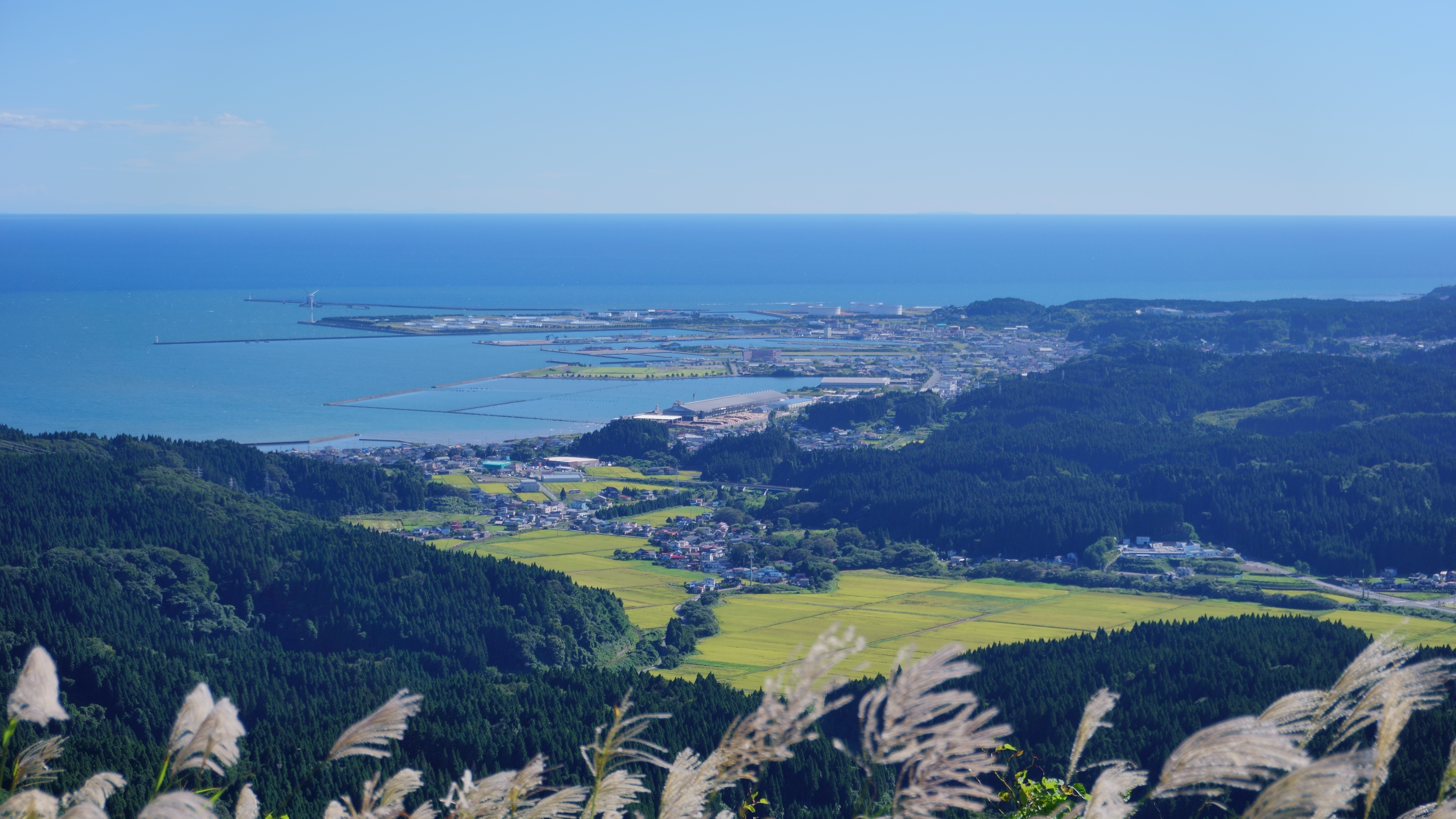
- View from Mount Kanpu

- Flag Seal
- Location of Oga in Akita Prefecture

- Coordinates: 39°53′12.6″N 139°50′51.3″E
- Country: Japan
- Region: Tōhoku
- Prefecture: Akita

Government
  - -Mayor: Koji Sugarawa (since April 2017)

Area
  - Total: 241.09 km^{2} (93.09 sq mi)

Population (February 28, 2023)
  - Total: 24,687
  - Density: 102.40/km^{2} (265.21/sq mi)
- Time zone: UTC+9 (Japan Standard Time)
- Phone number: 0185-23-2111
- Address: 66-1 Izumidai, Funagawaminato Funagawa, Oga-shi, Akita-ken 010-0595
- Climate: Cfa
- Website: Official website
- Symbols
- Bird: Grey heron
- Flower: Camellia
- Tree: Cryptomeria

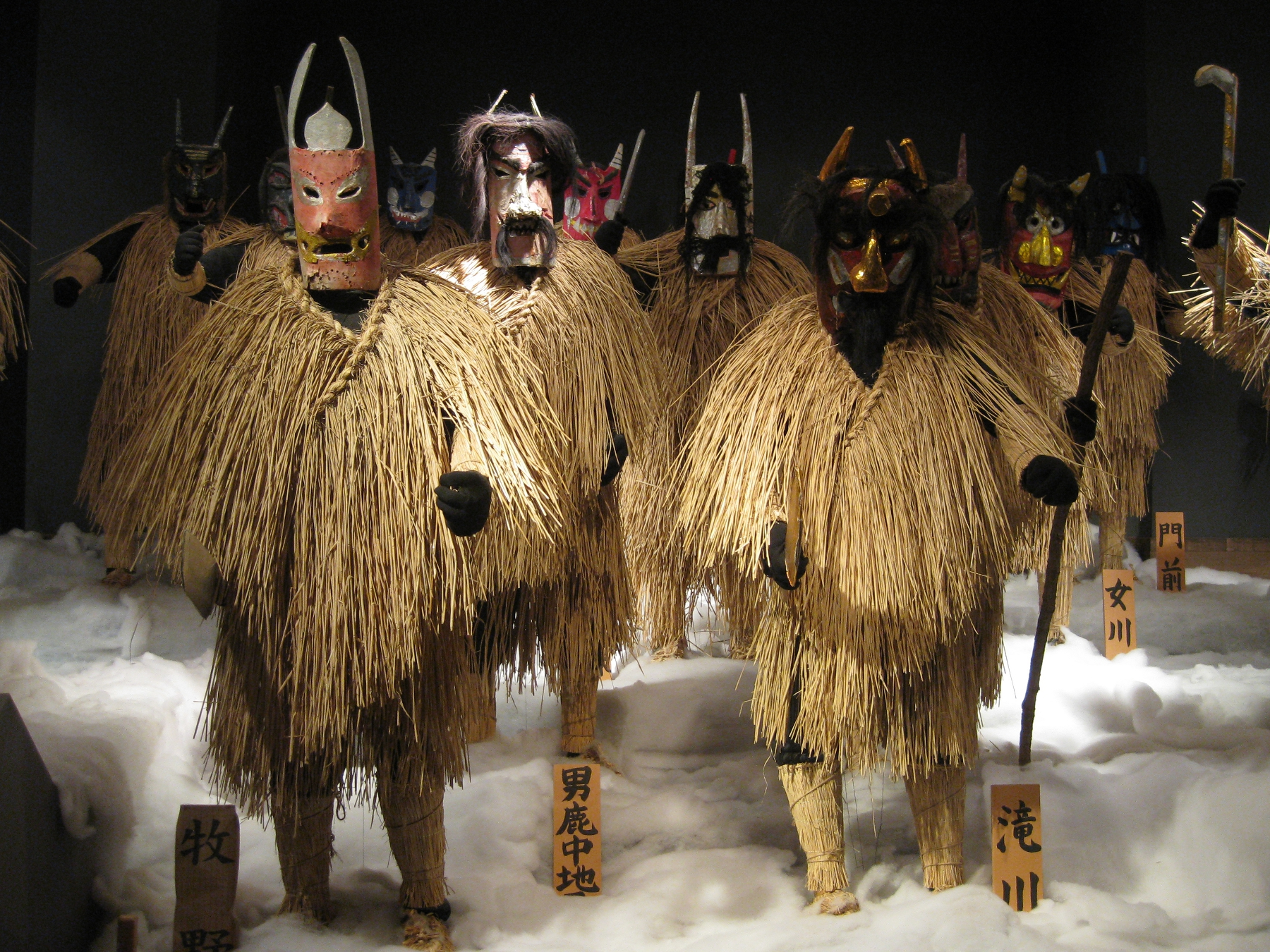
Namahage

Oga (男鹿市, Oga-shi; Japanese pronunciation: [ò̞.ɡä́(.ɕì), -ŋä́(.ɕì)]) is a city located in Akita Prefecture, Japan. As of 28 February 2023, the city has an estimated population of 24,687 in 12,496 households, and a population density of 100 persons per km^{2}. The total area of the city is 240.80 square kilometres (92.97 sq mi).

== Geography ==
Oga is located on the Oga Peninsula in northwestern Akita Prefecture, bordered by the Sea of Japan to the north, west and south. The Oga Peninsula has two mountains, Mount Kanpu and Mount Honzan, and several rivers, including the Takigawa. Toga Bay is located in the western part of the city, where Toga Port is located, and he northwestern end is called Cape Nyūdō. The population is concentrated in the southern part of the city, where the railway runs and the city hall is located. Much of the city is within the boundaries of the Oga Quasi-National Park.

=== Neighboring municipalities ===
Akita Prefecture

- Katagami
- Mitane
- Ōgata

=== Climate ===
Different from the rest of the prefecture, the climate is an isolated humid subtropical (Köppen: Cfa) by direct influence (due to being a peninsula) of the Tsushima Current, being the most northern city of the Asian continent with this categorization according to the 0 °C isotherm. Or the southern edge of the hot-summer humid continental (Dfa) by the normal of the Japan Meteorological Agency. Winters are mild and summers although the climatic type are warm but not hot. The extremes range from -14 to 35 °C, a relatively low thermal amplitude to a place at 39 °N and to the east near large land masses.

Climate data for Oga, elevation: 20 m, 1991-2020 normals, extremes 1976-present
Month	Jan	Feb	Mar	Apr	May	Jun	Jul	Aug	Sep	Oct	Nov	Dec	Year
Record high °C (°F)	12.1 (53.8)	16.1 (61.0)	17.8 (64.0)	26.1 (79.0)	30.2 (86.4)	32.7 (90.9)	35.6 (96.1)	35.3 (95.5)	34.6 (94.3)	27.9 (82.2)	21.6 (70.9)	16.6 (61.9)	35.6 (96.1)
Mean daily maximum °C (°F)	2.9 (37.2)	3.5 (38.3)	7.1 (44.8)	12.9 (55.2)	18.3 (64.9)	22.5 (72.5)	26.0 (78.8)	28.0 (82.4)	24.5 (76.1)	18.5 (65.3)	12.1 (53.8)	5.7 (42.3)	15.2 (59.3)
Daily mean °C (°F)	0.0 (32.0)	0.3 (32.5)	3.3 (37.9)	8.6 (47.5)	14.0 (57.2)	18.4 (65.1)	22.4 (72.3)	23.8 (74.8)	19.8 (67.6)	13.5 (56.3)	7.7 (45.9)	2.4 (36.3)	11.2 (52.1)
Mean daily minimum °C (°F)	−3.2 (26.2)	−3.4 (25.9)	−1.0 (30.2)	3.5 (38.3)	9.5 (49.1)	14.1 (57.4)	18.9 (66.0)	19.7 (67.5)	15.1 (59.2)	8.3 (46.9)	3.0 (37.4)	−1.1 (30.0)	7.0 (44.5)
Record low °C (°F)	−14.7 (5.5)	−14.4 (6.1)	−11.4 (11.5)	−4.2 (24.4)	1.0 (33.8)	5.0 (41.0)	10.4 (50.7)	10.9 (51.6)	5.4 (41.7)	−0.4 (31.3)	−7.8 (18.0)	−10.3 (13.5)	−14.7 (5.5)
Average precipitation mm (inches)	123.4 (4.86)	93.3 (3.67)	93.5 (3.68)	96.1 (3.78)	107.2 (4.22)	102.3 (4.03)	176.2 (6.94)	153.4 (6.04)	159.5 (6.28)	165.9 (6.53)	167.0 (6.57)	168.5 (6.63)	1,612.9 (63.50)
Average precipitation days (≥ 1.0 mm)	21.5	17.8	15.4	11.6	10.9	9.3	10.9	10.5	12.3	14.5	18.4	22.3	175.4
Mean monthly sunshine hours	53.0	71.0	129.2	179.2	196.0	185.5	162.8	200.6	164.0	147.5	96.1	60.5	1,648.8
Source: JPA

== Demographics ==
Per Japanese census data, the population of Oga peaked in the 1950s and has been in decline since then.

Historical population
Year	Pop.	±%
1920	39,549	—
1930	40,623	+2.7%
1940	41,143	+1.3%
1950	58,212	+41.5%
1960	58,075	−0.2%
1970	50,935	−12.3%
1980	47,829	−6.1%
1990	42,723	−10.7%
2000	38,130	−10.8%
2010	32,319	−15.2%
2020	25,154	−22.2%

== History ==
The area of present-day Oga was part of ancient Dewa Province, dominated by the Satake clan during the Edo period, who ruled Kubota Domain under the Tokugawa shogunate. The village of Funagawa was established with the establishment of the modern municipalities system on April 1, 1889 and became the town of Funagawaminato on October 24, 1894. The city of Oga was created on March 31, 1954, by the merger of the town of Funagawaminato with the four neighboring villages of Wakimoto, Iriai, Ogatanaka and Toga.

On March 22, 2005, the town of Wakami was merged into Oga.

== Government ==
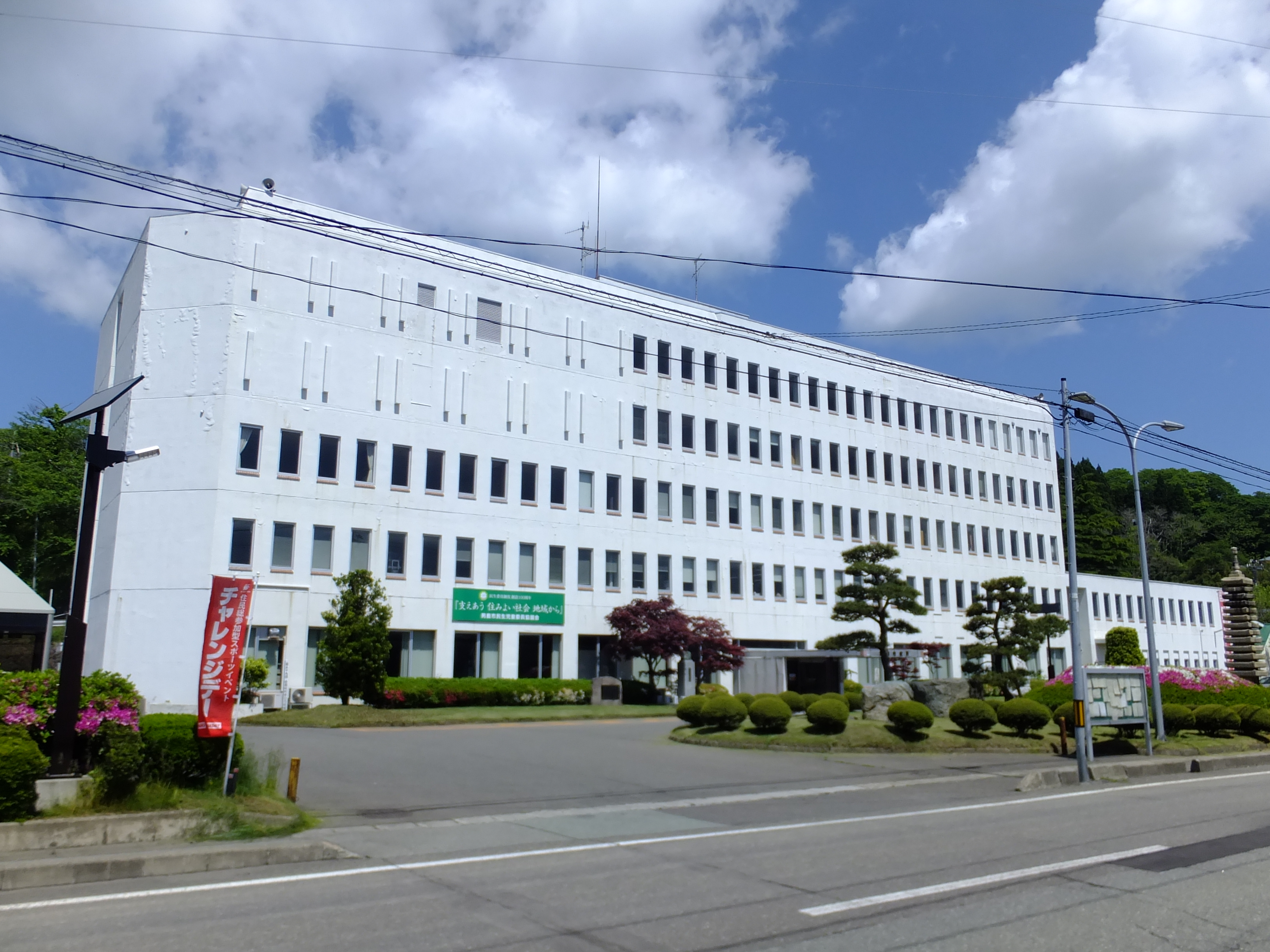
Oga City Hall

Oga has a mayor-council form of government with a directly elected mayor and a unicameral city legislature of 18 members. The city contributes one member to the Akita Prefectural Assembly. In terms of national politics, the city is part of Akita 2nd District of the lower house of the Diet of Japan.

== Economy ==
The economy of Oga is based on commercial fishing, tourism and agriculture.

== Education ==
Oga has six public elementary schools and two public middle schools operated by the city government and two public high schools operated by the Akita Prefectural Board of Education.

== Transportation ==
=== Railway ===
East Japan Railway Company – Oga Line

- Funakoshi – Wakimoto – Hadachi – Oga

=== Highway ===
- National Route 101

=== Bus ===
- Akita Chūō Kōtsū

=== Seaports ===
- Port of Funagawa

== Local attractions ==
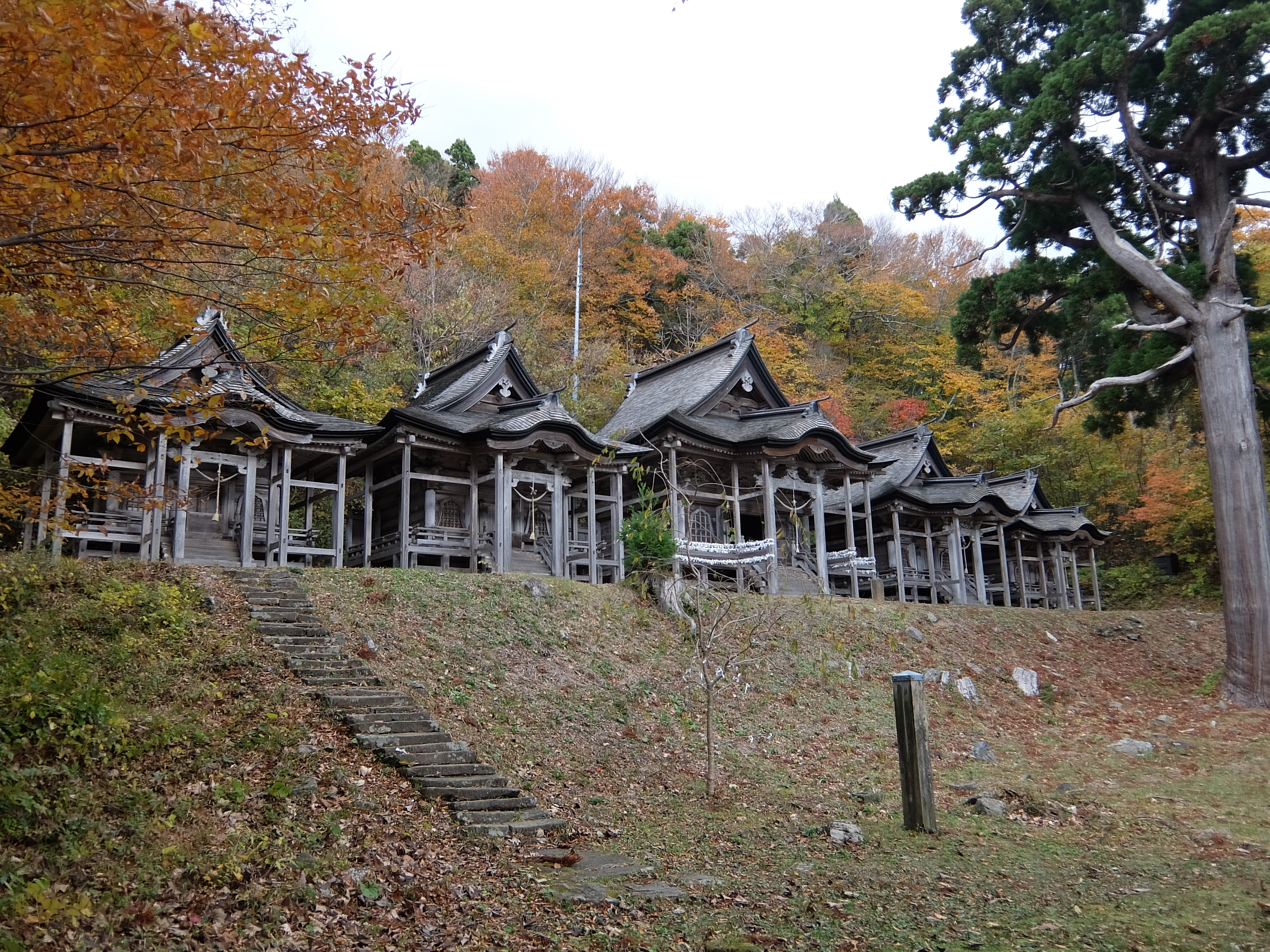
Akagami Shrine

- Godzilla Rock
- Namahage Museum
- Nyūdōzaki Lighthouse – one of the "50 Lighthouses of Japan"
- Oga Athletic Stadium
- Oga Aquarium Gao
- Oga Onsen
- Wakimoto Castle, National Historic Site

== Culture ==
Oga is famous for its Namahage Festival, a traditional event held on New Year's Eve in which groups of men dressed as ogre-like deities called "Namahage" with masks and straw raincoats visit houses at night.

== Sister cities ==
- Livingston, California, United States, since August 18, 1984

== Noted people from Oga ==
- Kenya Kodama, footballer
- Kazuo Nakamura (basketball), basketball coach
- Shokichi Natsui, judoka
- Shōji Nishimura, admiral
- Hiromitsu Ochiai, baseball player and manager
- Yoshihito Yoshida, rugby union footballer
- Yu Yoshimoto, basketball player
