= Port of Funagawa =

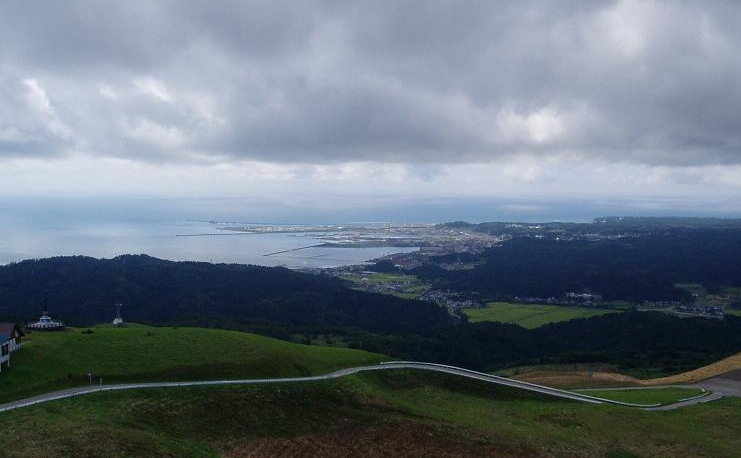
- Interactive map of Port of Funagawa

Location
- Country: Japan
- Location: Oga, Akita
- Coordinates: 39°52′49.76″N 139°51′32.10″E

Details
- Opened: 1951
- Operated by: Akita Prefecture
- Type of Harbor: Seaport
- Land area: 253.4 hectares
- No. of berths: 4

The Port of Funagawa (船川港, Funagawa-kō) is a seaport on the Sea of Japan coast of Akita Prefecture, in the city of Oga in the Tōhoku region of northern Honshū, Japan. It is classified as a Major Port (重要港湾, Jūyō-kōwan) by the Japanese government. The port has a total land area of 253.4 hectares.

== History ==
Located on the southern coast of Oga Peninsula, the site of Funagawa Port was a natural harbor used by fishermen since ancient times. In 1951, the port was earmarked for development by the Japanese government with the designation of a “major port” and in 1965 with its designation as part of the Akita Bay Industrial Development Zone. The main industries served by Funagawa Port are oil refineries and wood processing plants. In 1982, Funagawa Port was designated as part of Japan’s strategic petroleum reserve, with a tank farm consisting of 12 underground and four above ground tanks with a total capacity of 4,480,000 kiloliters completed and at full capacity by 1995.

== Berths ==
- 5,000 ton quay
- 5,000 ton quay
- 7,000 ton quay
- 15,000 ton quay

== Events ==
- Oga Fireworks Display
