= Hiromitsu Ochiai =

Japanese baseball player (born 1953)

Hiromitsu Ochiai 落合 博満
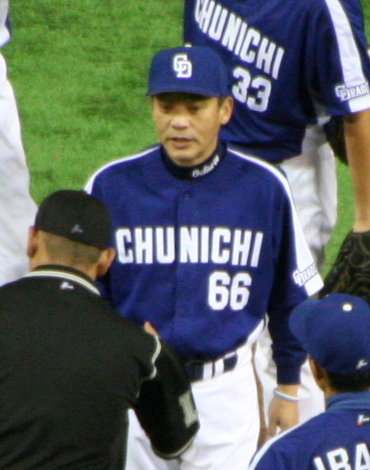
- Ochiai in 2007
- Born: December 9, 1953 (age 72); Wakami, Akita, Japan
- Batted: Right Threw: Right

NPB debut
- May 29, 1979, for the Lotte Orions

Last appearance
- October 7, 1998, for the Nippon Ham Fighters

NPB statistics
- Batting average: .311
- Hits: 2,371
- Home runs: 510
- Runs batted in: 1,564
- Stats at Baseball Reference

Teams
- As player: Lotte Orions (1979–1986); Chunichi Dragons (1987–1993); Yomiuri Giants (1994–1996); Nippon-Ham Fighters (1997–1998); As manager: Chunichi Dragons (2004–2011); As general manager: Chunichi Dragons (2013–2017)

Career highlights and awards
- As player: 2× Pacific League MVP (1982, 1985); 3x Japanese Triple Crown (1982, 1985, 1986); 10x Best Nine Award (1981–1986, 1988–1991); Japan Series champion (1994); As manager: Japan Series champion (2007)

Member of the Japanese

Baseball Hall of Fame
- Induction: 2011

Hiromitsu Ochiai (落合 博満, Ochiai Hiromitsu; born December 9, 1953) is a Japanese former professional baseball manager and player. He is the former manager of the Chunichi Dragons in Japan's Nippon Professional Baseball. He is considered to be one of the most important players in the history of Japanese baseball, winning numerous batting awards and being the only player to receive the prestigious triple crown batting award three times. With 510 career home runs, Ochiai is sixth on the all-time NPB list. Ochiai's style is called Oreryu(オレ流). Oreryu means "to do with only my style." The word described how he acted according to his personal philosophies.

== Biography ==
Ochiai was born in the town of Wakami in Akita, Japan, a rice-farming area of northern Honshū. Ochiai was the youngest of seven children and grew up enjoying spending time in the cinema rather than on the baseball field. During high school at Akita Tech, he did not like Japanese high school baseball's nature, even dropping out of Toyo University when he found out he was going to endure something similar. He joined Toshiba Fuchu, a team in the Japanese industrial league, after leaving Toyo University and went back to his home town and spent some years as a professional bowler.

In 1978, at 25 years old, the third baseman joined the Lotte Orions after being selected in the third round of the draft. The Lotte manager did not care for his unorthodox right-handed batting style and Masaichi Kaneda criticized Ochiai, but Isao Harimoto supported Ochiai and Ochiai did not quit. From 1981, Ochiai played a regular role for his team, and in 1982 he won his first triple crown batting title. He also won the Triple Crown in 1985 and 1986, and continued winning titles through 1991. The 1985 one was notable, as it wasn't an all-NPB one, as Hanshin Tigers player Randy Bass also put a Triple Crown season of his own. Because of that, Japanese media completely changed their stance on Ochiai. Instead of heavily disliking him due to his attitude about the tradition of Japanese baseball, he was instead seen as being "Japan's answer to Bass", and attempted to paint both as bitter rivals. However, they actually both respected each other.

In 1987, Ochiai was traded to the Chunichi Dragons by the Lotte Orions. In 1991, he was the first NPB player to seek arbitration, trying to raise his salary from $1.38 million to $2.07 million, but the arbitrators (commissioner Ichiro Yoshikuni and the heads of the Pacific and Central League) ruled that the offer of $1.69 million was fair. That year, he won his tenth and final Best Nine Award. Ochiai was named a Best Nine Award winner in three different positions (first base, second base, third base). During the 1994 season, the Yomiuri Giants picked up Ochiai as a free agent. That year, the Giants won the Japan Series. After the Giants signed Kazuhiro Kiyohara in 1997, Ochiai joined the Nippon-Ham Fighters at the age of 43. At the conclusion of the 1998 season, Ochiai retired.

Hiromitsu Ochiai was the manager of the Chunichi Dragons from 2004 to 2011. He led the Dragons to the Japan Series during his inaugural year as manager in 2004, again in 2006, and led them to victory on the third try in 2007. His contract was not renewed after leading the Dragons to within a game of winning the 2011 Japan Series. He was often criticized for his decision-making, such as removing starting pitcher Daisuke Yamai to start the ninth inning of game five of the 2007 Japan Series. Yamai had been pitching a perfect game. Closer Hitoki Iwase finished off the ninth for a rare combined perfect game to clinch the championship for the Dragons.

Ochiai was inducted into the Japanese Baseball Hall of Fame in 2011. The Hiromitsu Ochiai Baseball Hall opened in Taiji, Wakayama in 1993 starting a trend of museums dedicated to famous ballplayers.

On October 9, 2013, Ochiai was appointed general manager of the Chunichi Dragons. On December 20, 2016 it was announced that Ochiai would step down from his role as general manager at the end of his contract in January 2017.

== Awards and accomplishments ==
- MVP (1982, 1985)
- Triple Crown (1982, 1985, 1986)
- Batting Title (1981~1983, 1985, 1986)
- Home run Title (1982, 1985, 1986, 1990, 1991)
- Run batted in Title (1982, 1985, 1986, 1989, 1990)
- On-base percentage Title (1982, 1985~1988, 1990, 1991)
- Best Nine Award (1981~1986, 1988~1991)
- Matsutaro Shoriki Award (2007)

== Career batting statistics ==
Year	Team	Number	G	PA	AB	R	H	2B	3B	HR	TB	RBI	SB	CS	SB	SF	BB	HBP	K	DP	ERR	AVG	OBP	SLG	OPS
1979	Lotte Orions	6	36	69	64	7	15	3	1	2	26	7	1	0	0	0	4	1	12	2	1	.234	.290	.406	.696
1980	Lotte Orions	6	57	188	166	28	47	7	0	15	99	32	1	0	2	2	17	1	23	5	5	.283	.349	.596	.946
1981	Lotte Orions	6	127	502	423	69	138	19	3	33	262	90	6	3	1	4	68	6	55	17	9	.326	.423	.619	1.043
1982	Lotte Orions	6	128	552	462	86	150	32	1	32	280	99	8	2	0	4	81	5	58	11	7	.325	.428	.606	1.034
1983	Lotte Orions	6	119	497	428	79	142	22	1	25	241	75	6	5	0	3	64	2	52	14	7	.332	.419	.563	.982
1984	Lotte Orions	6	129	562	456	89	143	17	3	33	265	94	8	1	0	4	98	4	33	14	16	.314	.436	.581	1.017
1985	Lotte Orions	6	130	568	460	118	169	21	1	52	351	146	5	1	0	4	101	3	40	16	19	.367	.481	.763	1.244
1986	Lotte Orions	6	123	522	417	98	150	11	0	50	311	116	5	1	0	1	101	3	59	15	10	.360	.487	.746	1.232
1987	Chunichi Dragons	6	125	519	432	83	143	33	0	28	260	85	1	4	0	4	81	2	51	10	9	.331	.435	.602	1.037
1988	Chunichi Dragons	6	130	557	450	82	132	31	1	32	261	95	3	4	0	6	98	3	70	11	10	.293	.418	.580	.998
1989	Chunichi Dragons	6	130	559	476	78	153	23	1	40	298	116	4	3	1	6	75	1	69	11	6	.321	.410	.626	1.036
1990	Chunichi Dragons	6	131	570	458	93	133	19	1	34	256	102	3	3	0	8	100	4	87	7	7	.290	.416	.559	.975
1991	Chunichi Dragons	6	112	478	374	80	127	17	0	37	255	91	4	2	0	5	95	4	55	9	5	.340	.473	.682	1.155
1992	Chunichi Dragons	6	116	481	384	58	112	22	1	22	202	71	2	3	0	6	88	3	74	12	3	.292	.425	.526	.948
1993	Chunichi Dragons	6	119	504	396	64	113	19	0	17	183	65	1	2	0	8	96	4	69	13	4	.285	.423	.462	.885
1994	Yomiuri Giants	60	129	540	447	53	125	19	0	15	189	68	0	0	0	6	81	6	56	13	8	.280	.393	.423	.815
1995	Yomiuri Giants	6	117	483	399	64	124	15	1	17	192	65	1	0	0	8	73	3	87	17	5	.311	.414	.481	.895
1996	Yomiuri Giants	6	106	448	376	60	113	18	0	21	194	86	3	0	0	2	67	3	53	11	6	.301	.408	.516	.924
1997	Nippon Ham Fighters	3	113	466	397	35	104	14	0	3	127	43	3	0	0	5	61	3	60	16	3	.262	.361	.320	.680
1998	Nippon Ham Fighters	3	59	192	162	11	38	6	0	2	50	18	0	1	0	2	26	2	22	12	0	.235	.344	.309	.652
Total			2236	9257	7627	1335	2371	371	15	510	4302	1564	65	35	4	88	1475	63	1135	236	140	.311	.422	.564	.987

== See also ==
- List of top Nippon Professional Baseball home run hitters
- List of Nippon Professional Baseball players with 1,000 runs batted in
- List of Nippon Professional Baseball career hits leaders
