= Oga Quasi-National Park =

Quasi-national park in Akita prefecture, Japan

- 男鹿国定公園
- IUCN category V (protected landscape/seascape)
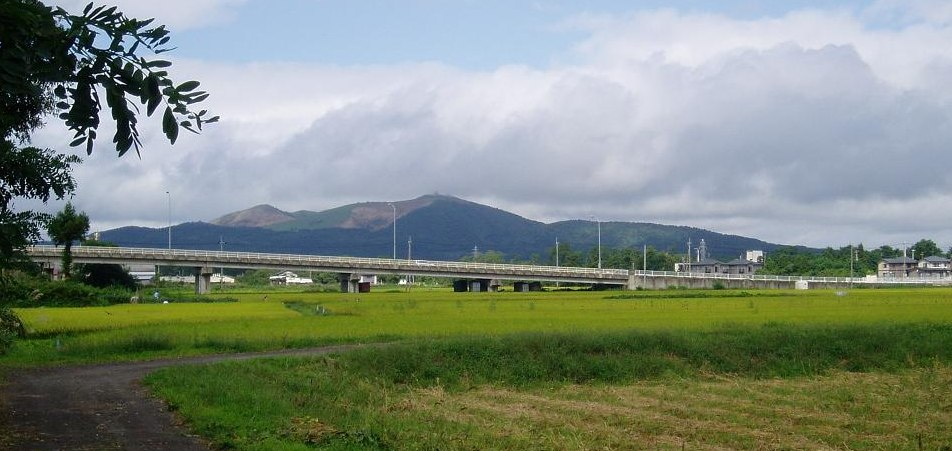
- Mount Kanpū (355 m)
- Interactive map of Oga Quasi-National Park
- Location: Honshū, Japan
- Nearest city: Oga, Akita Prefecture, Japan
- Coordinates: 39°54′50″N 139°43′18″E
- Area: 81.56 km^{2} (31.49 sq mi)
- Established: 15 May 1973
- Governing body: Akita prefectural government

Oga Quasi-National Park (男鹿国定公園, Oga Kokutei Kōen) is a quasi-national park on the Oga Peninsula, in Akita Prefecture, in far northwestern Japan. The park is wholly within the city of Oga. It is rated a protected landscape (Category V) according to the IUCN.

The area was designated a quasi-national park on May 15, 1973.

Like all quasi-national parks in Japan, the park is managed by the local prefectural government; in this case, that of Akita prefecture.

== Godzilla Rock (Oga) ==
On the southern part of the Oga Peninsula, there is a place called Cape Shiosezaki. One of the rocks there is nicknamed Godzilla Rock for its silhouette resembling Godzilla. (39°51′30.2″N 139°45′22.2″E) When the sun sets next to the natural formation, it can create the image of Godzilla blowing fire or more commonly known as radiation in the movies flame-blowing monster. The other eroded and named rocks are Godzilla's Tail Rock, Gamera Rock, Turtle Rock, Twin Rocks and Sailboat Rock.

=== Gallery ===
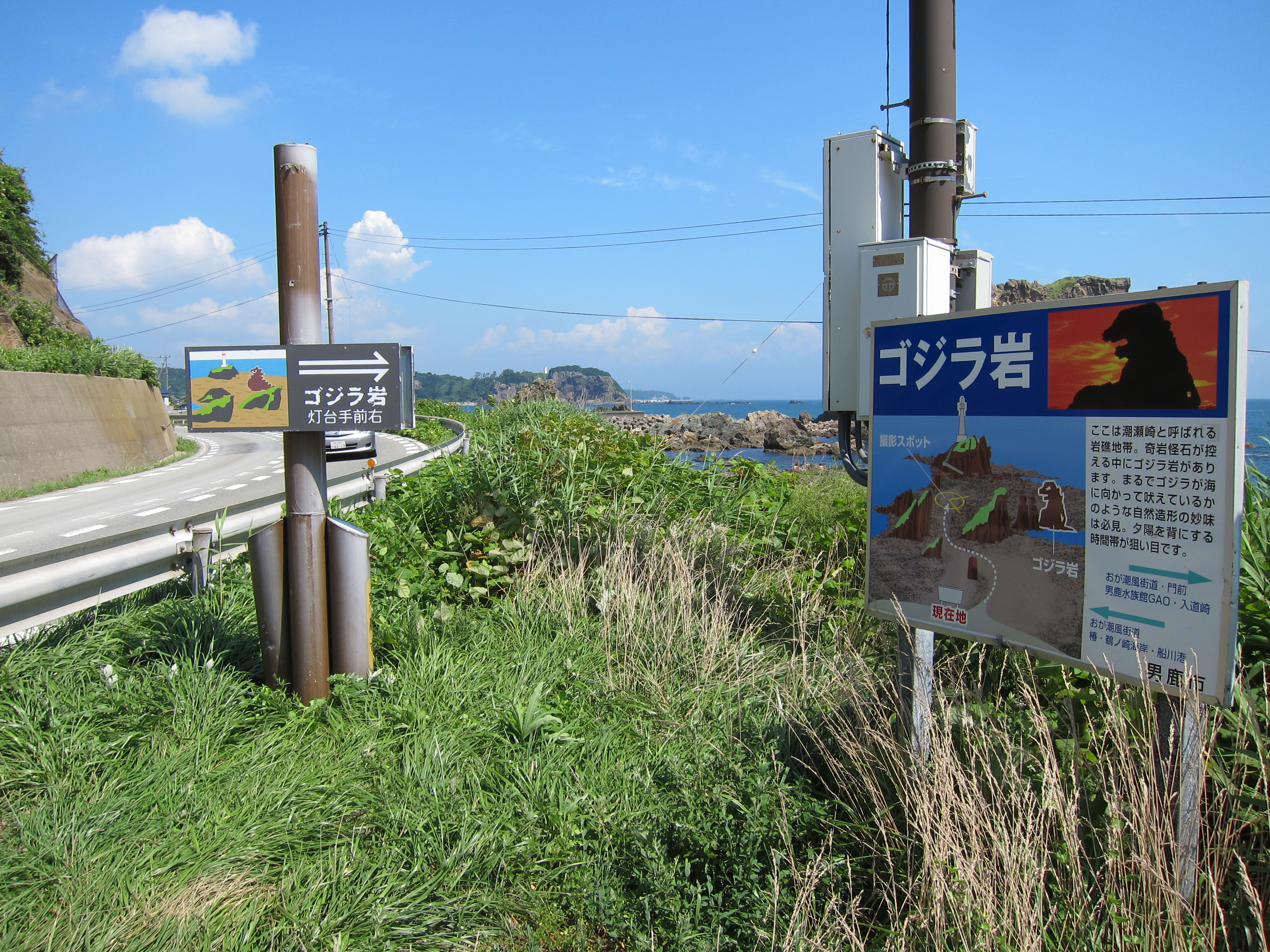
Godzilla Rock signs

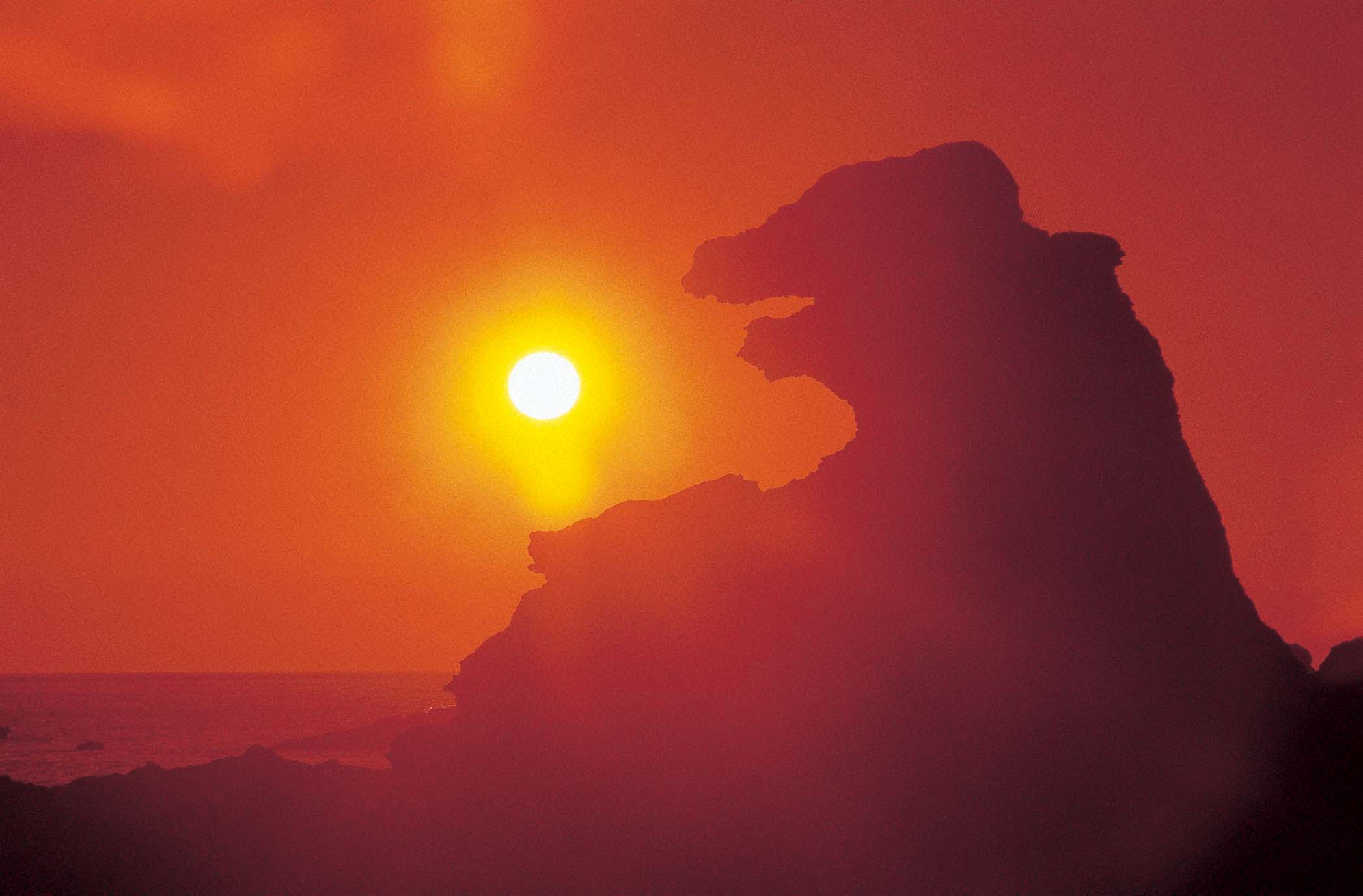
2008

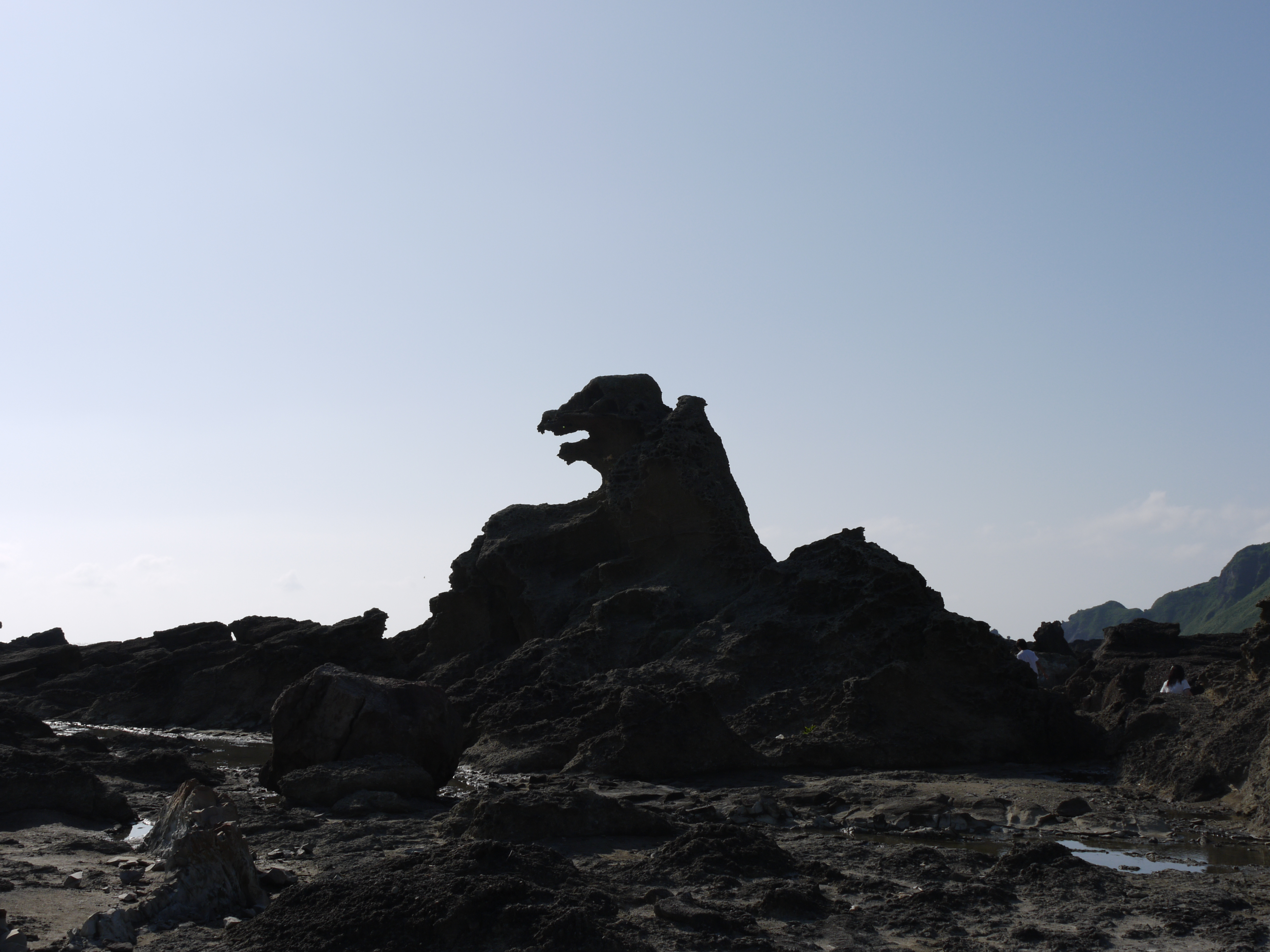
2009

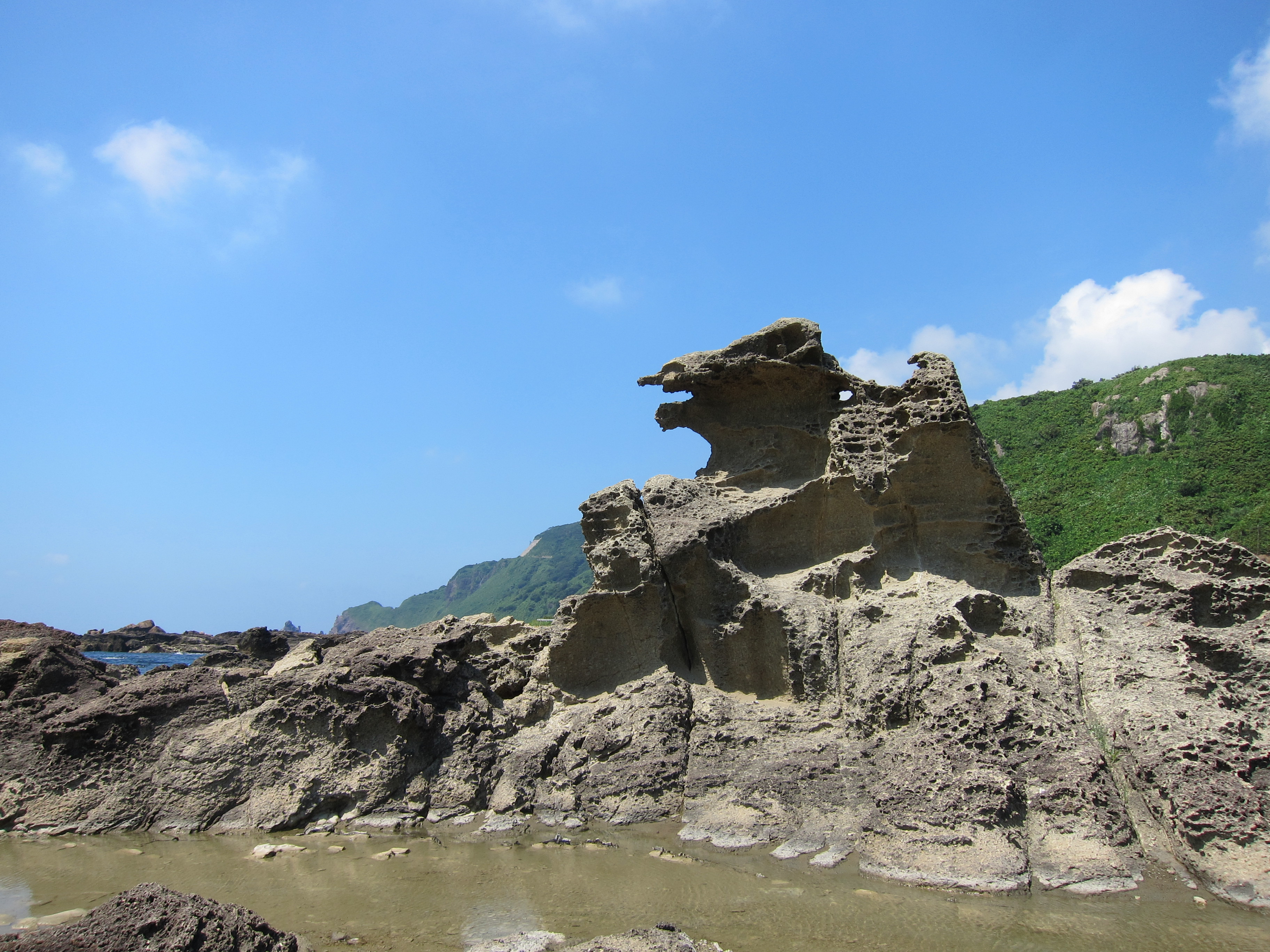
2013

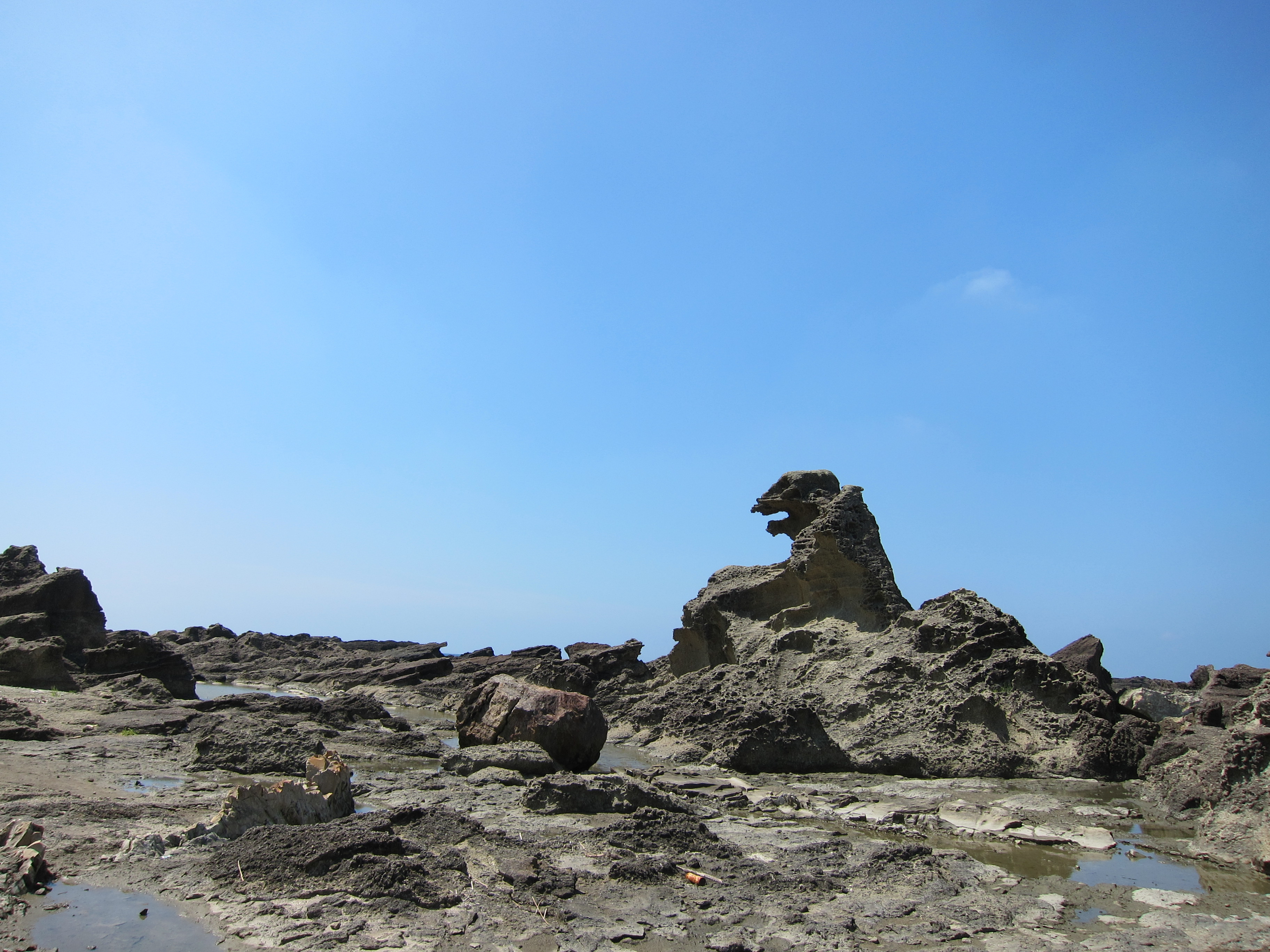
2013

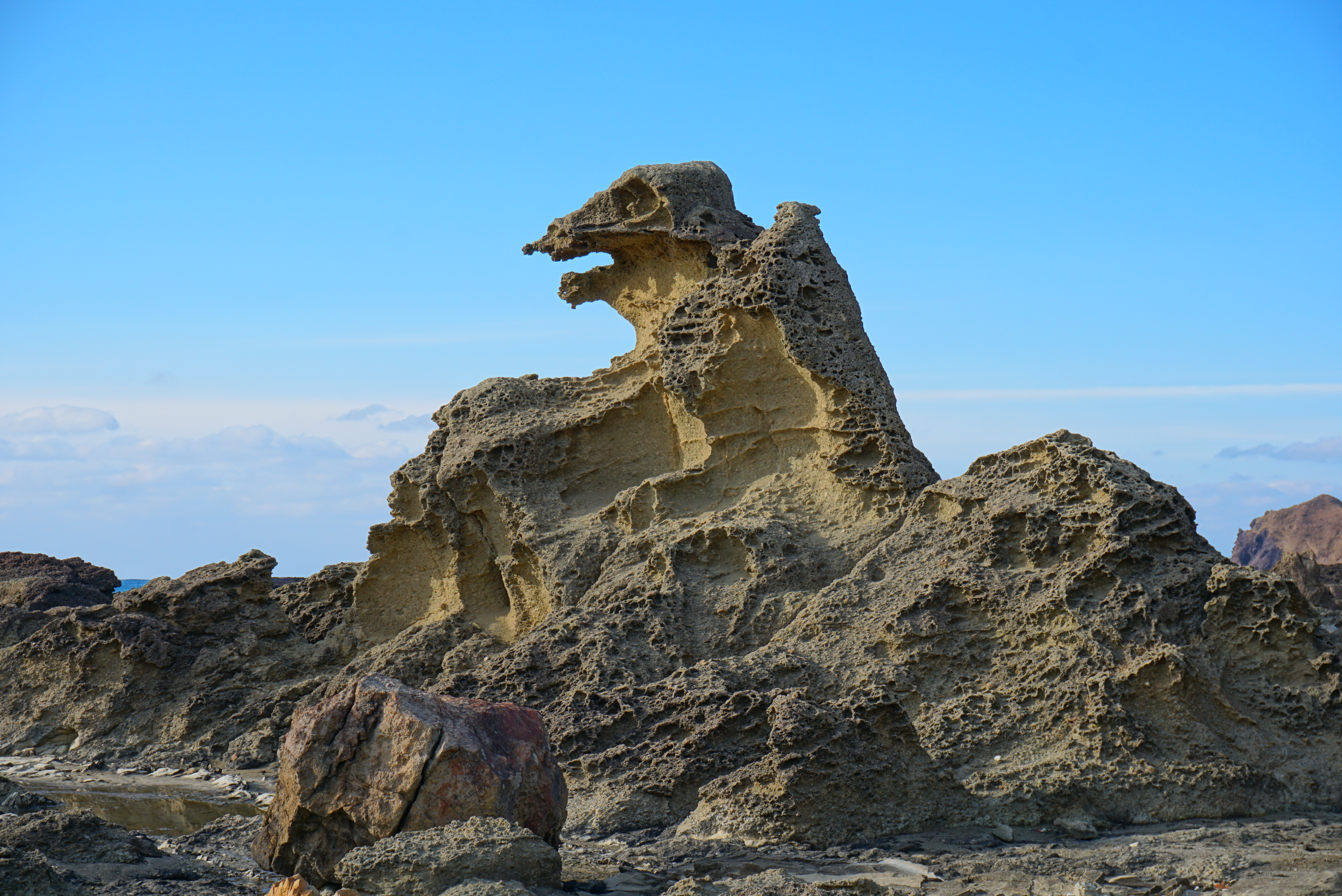
2020

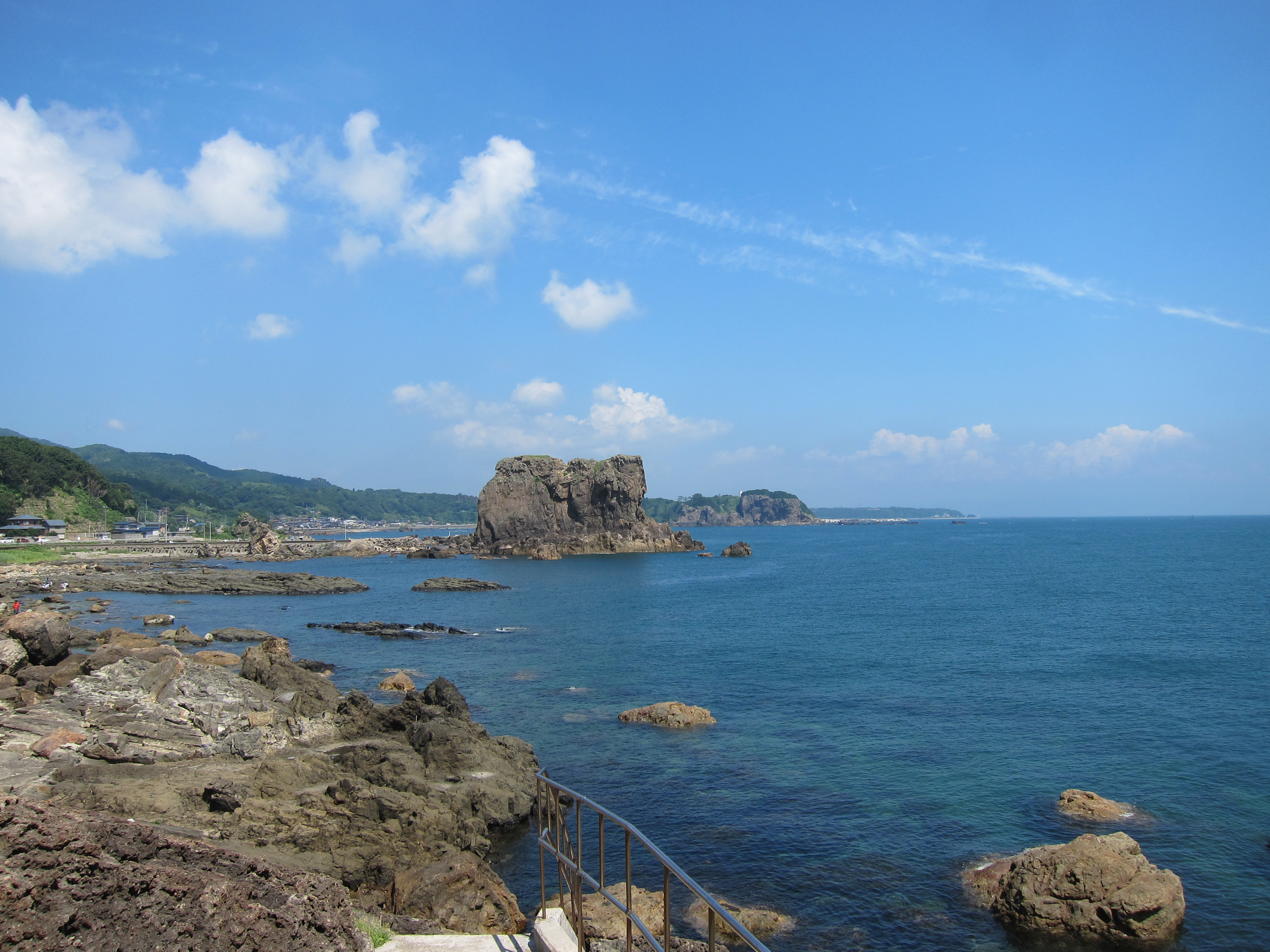
Sailboat Rock, height of 30m

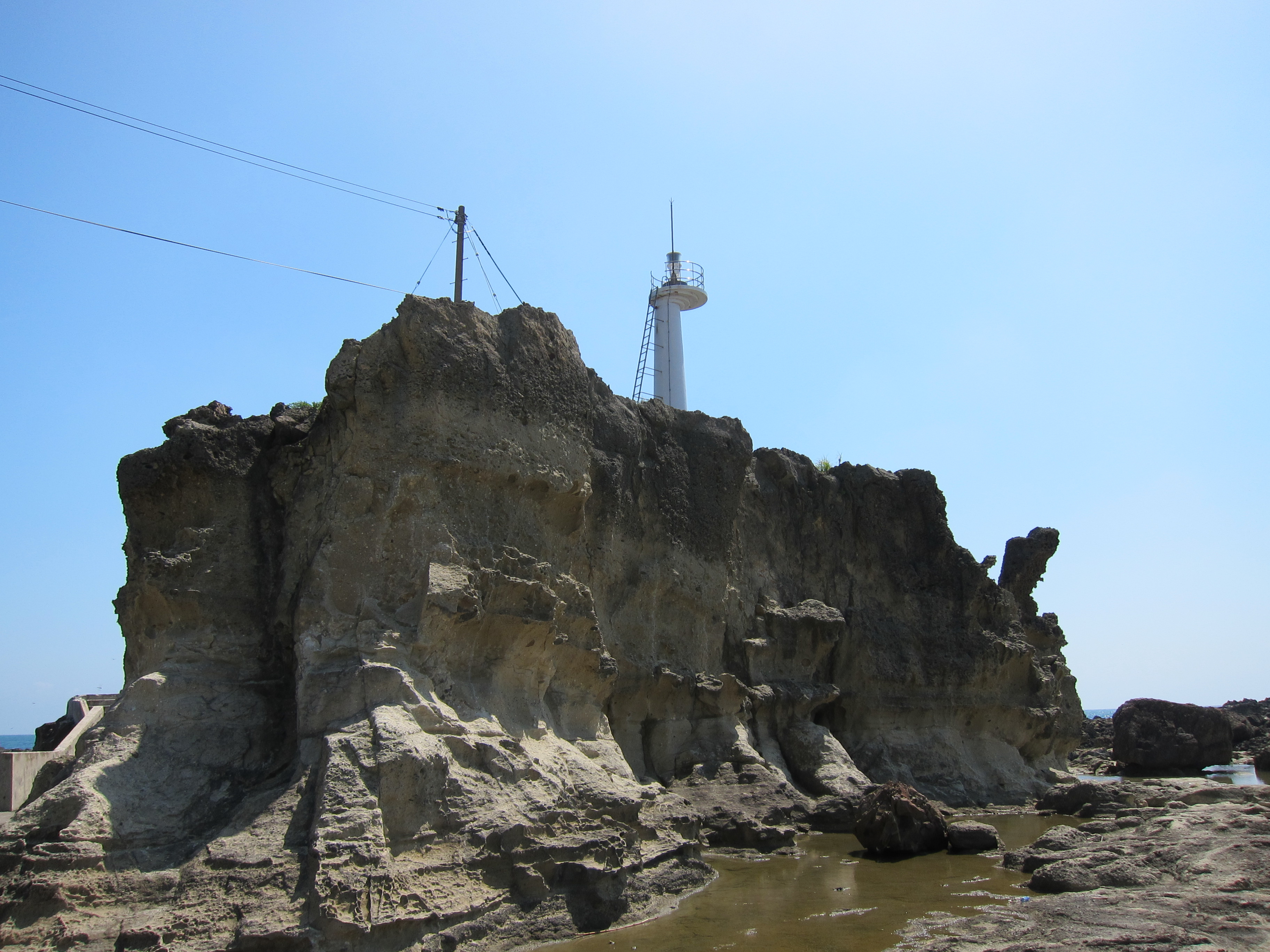
Shiosezaki Lighthouse on Turtle Rock

== See also ==
- Oga Aquarium Gao
- Nyūdōzaki Lighthouse
- List of national parks of Japan
