= Wakami, Akita =

Dissolved municipality in Akita prefecture, Japan

Wakami (若美町, Wakami-machi) was a town located in Minamiakita District, Akita Prefecture, Japan.

In 2003, the town had an estimated population of 7,310 and a density of 171.40 persons per km^{2}. The total area was 42.65 km^{2}.

On March 22, 2005, Wakami was merged into the expanded city of Oga.

Wakami's main crops were rice, melons, tobacco, flowers, grapes, and potatoes

== Sister city ==
Livingston, California
