= Namahage =

Japanese folklore character associated with new year's ritual

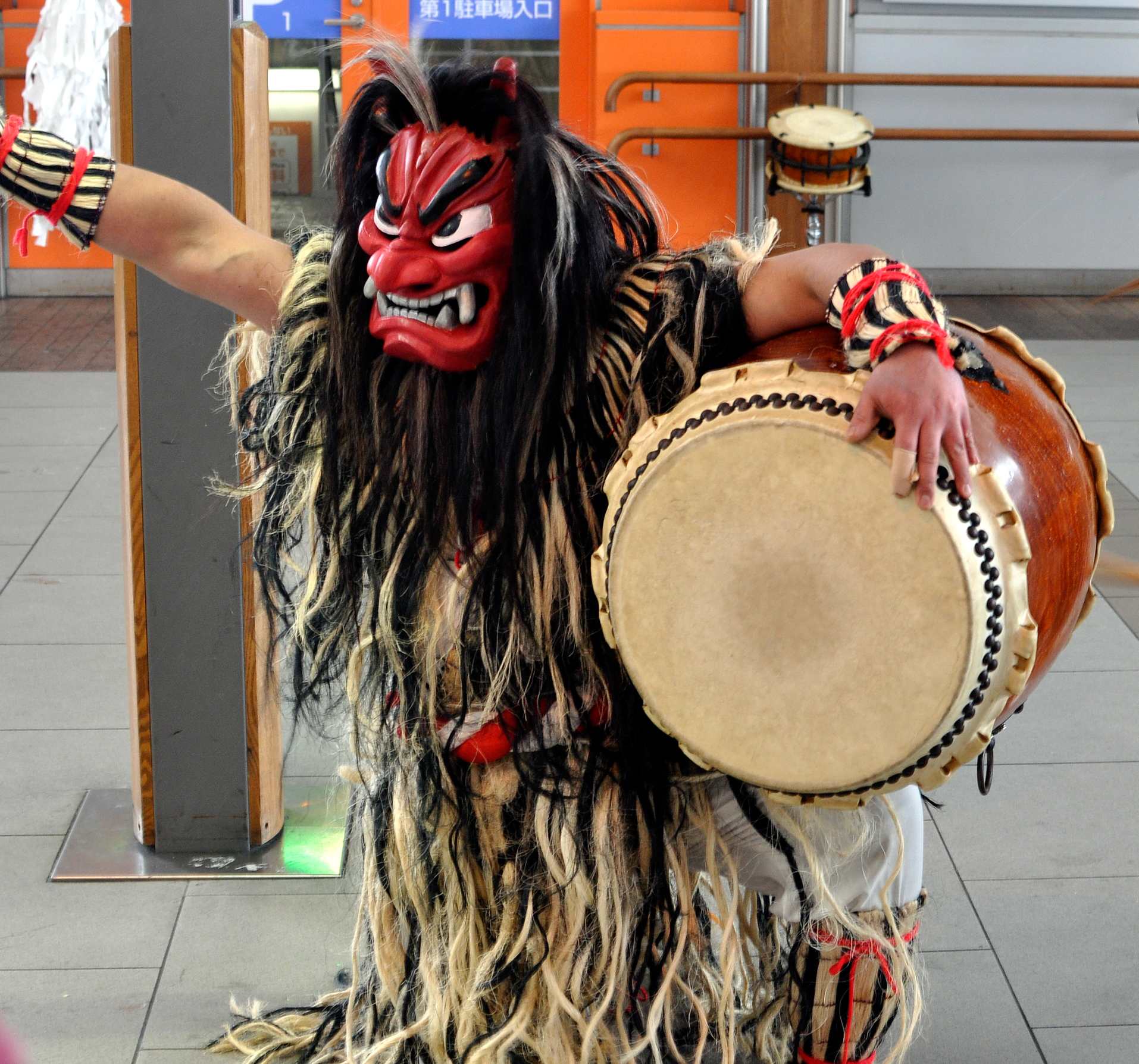
A dancing drummer wearing a Namahage costume, performed Namahage-Daiko in Akita Station.

The Namahage (生剥げ, なまはげ) are demonlike beings portrayed by men wearing hefty oni (ogre) masks and traditional straw capes (mino) during a New Year's ritual, in local northern Japanese folklore of the Oga Peninsula area of Akita Prefecture.

== General description ==
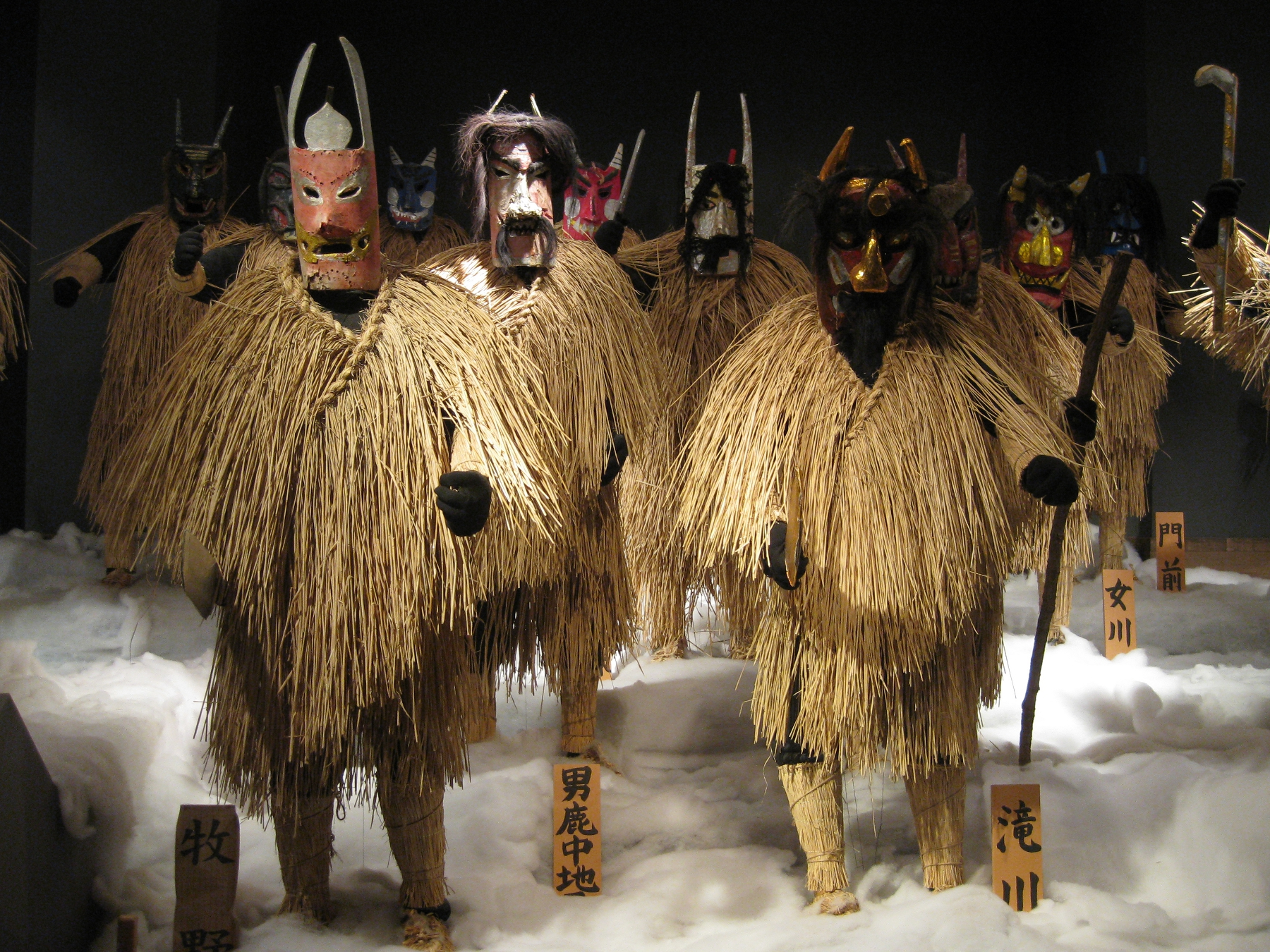
Namahage costumes

Blue and red namahage costumes

Namahage are portrayed by men who don oni masks and dress in long straw coats or mino, which are locally called kede or kende. They are equipped with deba knives (usually fakes made of wood or papier-mâché) and a teoke (手桶, "hand pail" made of wood). Marching in small groups of two or three, the namahage go door-to-door between people's homes, admonishing children who may be guilty of laziness or bad behavior by yelling phrases like "Are there any crybabies around?" (泣く子はいねがぁ, Nakuko wa inee gā?) or "Are naughty kids around?" (悪い子はいねえか, Waruiko wa inee ka?) in the pronunciation and accent of the local dialect.

Traditionally, the namahage have worn painted wooden masks, sometimes made of wood bark, and primarily painted red. In recent years, however, masks are manufactured using cardboard material, flattened metal canisters, or other recycled materials, atop a frame made from bamboo strainers. One example from the hamlet of Yumoto (incorporated into the city of Oga) features namahage who travel in pairs, one red-faced, the other blue-faced.

The straw attire are often described as a mino (standard Japanese), (Note: Or kera in northeastern dialect.) but these are considered particular items of clothing known locally as kede (or kende; kedashi).

== Etymology ==
The namahage's purpose was to admonish laggards, who sit around the fire idly and do nothing useful. One of the refrains used by the namahage in the olden days was "Blisters peeled yet?" (なもみコ剝げたかよ, namomi ko hagetaka yo). Namomi signifies heat blisters, or more precisely hidako (火だこ, hidako) (Note: The Japanese name is misleading since it is called a type of tako (callus).) (Erythema ab igne or EAI), (Note: Foster identifies as cutis marmorata) which in Japanese is dairisekiyō hihan (大理石様皮斑), but hidako is glossed as onnetsusei kōhan (温熱性紅斑) in medical literature, which corresponds to Erythema ab igne. Folklorist literature such as Ine mention hidako, but not the precise medical term for it. A rashlike condition is caused by overexposure to fire from sitting around the dugout irori hearth. Thus "fire rash peeling" is generally believed to be the derivation of the name namahage.

== Tradition ==
Although the namahage are nowadays conceived of as a type of oni or ogre, it was originally a custom where youngsters impersonated the kami who made visitations during the New Year's season. It is therefore a kind of toshigami.

The practice has shifted over the years, as according to 20th century descriptions, the namahage would typically receive mochi (rice cakes) from the households they visited, with newlywed couples being required to host them in full formal attire, and offer them sake and food. The namahage still receive hospitality in a similar manner during the New Years, but in a reversal of roles, the namahage distribute mochi to visitors (tourists) during the Namahage sedo matsuri (なまはげ柴灯まつり, Namahage Sedo Festival) held in February.

=== Season ===
Being a New Year's ritual, the namahage visits currently take place on New Year's Eve of the Gregorian calendar, though in the past they were held on the "Little New Year" (小正月, Koshōgatsu), or the first full moon of the year. This is the 15th day of the first lunar calendrical month, which does not equate to January 15; it usually falls around mid-February, exactly two weeks after the Chinese New Year (Japanese: Kyūshogatsu).

The aforementioned Namahage Sedo Festival, which was not established until 1964, is held annually on the second weekend of February (roughly coinciding with the "Little New Year"), at the Shinzan Shrine. (Note: Initially held at Hoshitsuji Shrine (星辻神社).)

=== Dialogue or phraseology ===
Some of the namahage's other spoken lines of old were "Knife whetted yet?" (包丁コとげたかよ, hōchōko togetaka yo) and "Boiled adzuki beans done yet?" (小豆コ煮えたかよ, azuki ko nietaka yo). The knife apparently signified the instrument to peel the blisters, and it was customary to have azuki gruel on the "Little New Year".

== Legend ==
The legend of the namahage varies from region to region. There are four theories or legends about the origin of namahage on the Oga Peninsula in Akita Prefecture.

The first theory is inspired by the appearance of yamabushi (山伏, Shugendō practitioners) who prayed in the houses of villages after their rigorous ascetic training at mountains such as Honzan (本山) and Shinzan (真山).

The second theory is inspired by the image of the messenger of the mountain kami. In this theory, the Oga Peninsula looks like a mountain from the sea and is revered as the place where the mountain kami resides to protect the lives of the villagers.

The third theory is inspired by the appearance of a foreigner who had washed ashore. In this theory, the people of Oga regarded the foreigner, who had a strange appearance and spoke a language they had never heard before, as an oni.

The fourth theory is inspired by the legend of Emperor Wu of Han. According to this theory, the namahage was born from five bats who followed Emperor Wu to Oga peninsula and turned into oni. The oni established quarters in the two local high peaks, Honzan (本山) and Shinzan (真山). These oni stole crops and young women from Oga's villages. The citizens of Oga thus wagered the demons that if they could build a flight of stone steps, one thousand steps in all, from the village to the five shrine halls (in one variant, from the sea shore to the top of Mt. Shinzan) all in one night, then the villagers would supply them with a young woman every year; if they failed the task, they would have to leave. Just as the ogres were about to complete the work, a villager mimicked the cry of a rooster, and the ogres departed, believing they had failed.

== Interpretations ==
One purpose of the festival is to encourage young children to obey their parents and to behave. Parents know who the Namahage actors are each year and might request them to teach specific lessons to their children during their visit. The Namahage repeat the lessons to the children before leaving the house.

Some ethnologists and folklorists suggest it relates to a belief in deities (or spirits) coming from abroad to take away misfortune and bring blessings for the new year, while others believe it to be an agricultural custom where the kami from the sacred mountains visit.

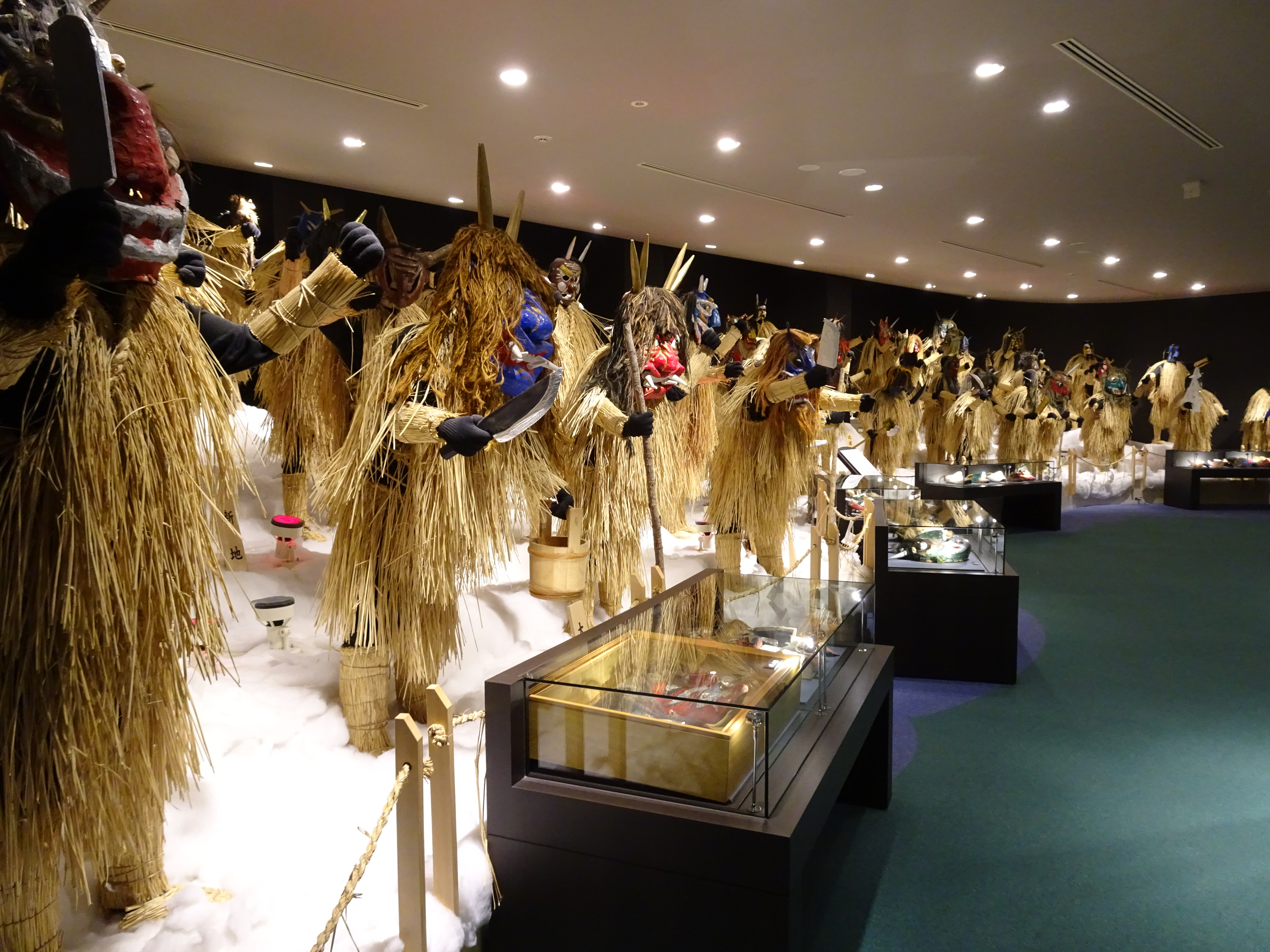
Namahage-kan or Namahage Museum, Oga, Akita

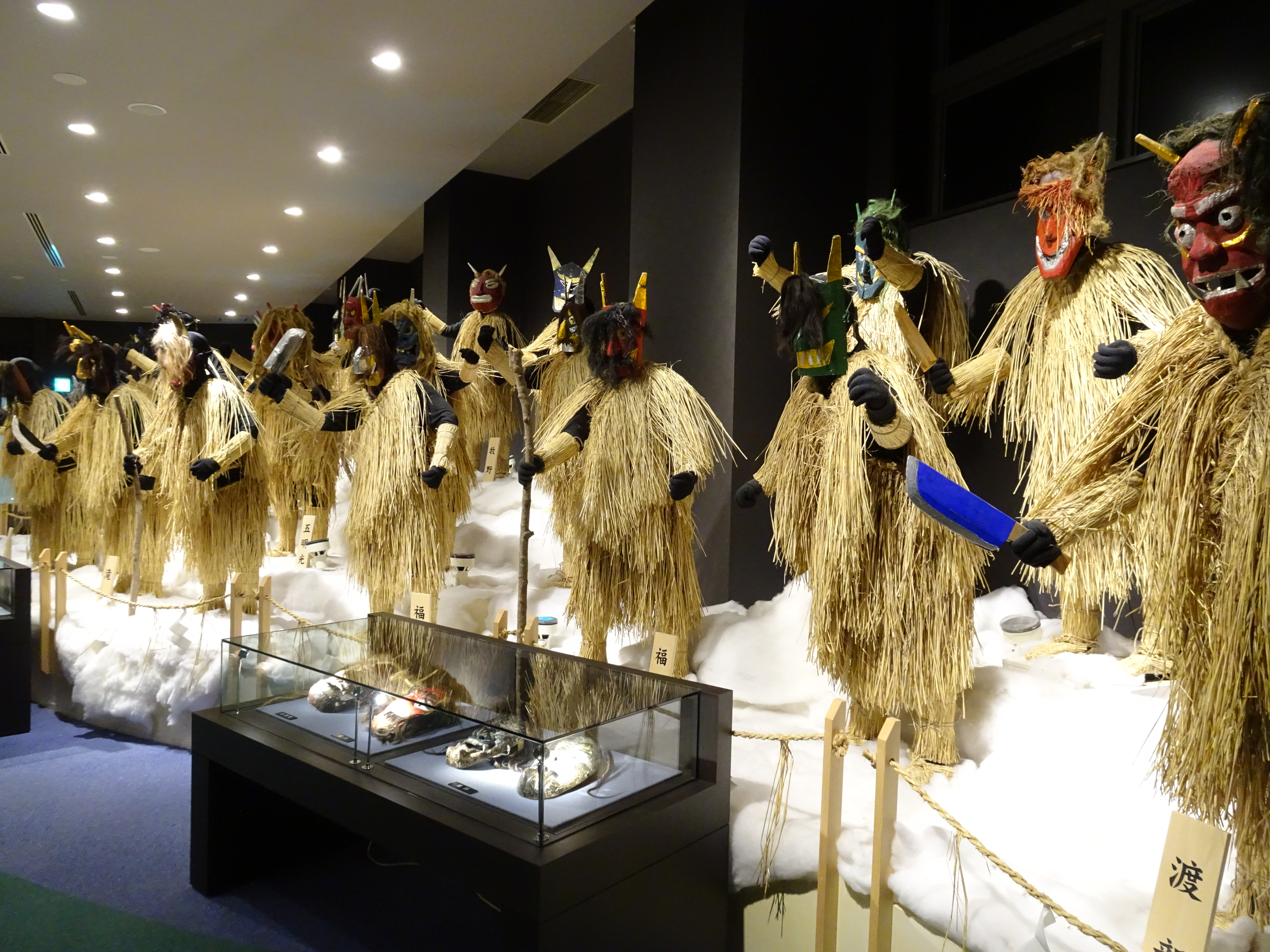
Namahage Museum

== Similar ogre traditions ==
The tradition of namahage visits occurs in the Oga Peninsula area of Akita Prefecture.

Although the namahage of Oga has become the foremost recognized, cognate traditions occur in other regions throughout Japan, viz.:

- Akamata-Kuromata, a parallel but secretive practice of the Yaeyama Islands, Okinawa
- Amaburakosagi (あまぶらこさぎ) in Ehime Prefecture (Shikoku)
- Amahage (アマハゲ) of Yamagata Prefecture.
- Amamehagi (あまめはぎ) of Ishikawa Prefecture.
- Appossha (あっぽっしゃ) of Fukui Prefecture.
- Nagomehagi (ナゴメハギ) of Noshiro, Akita.
- Suneka (スネカ), Anmo, Nagomi or Nagomihakuri in northern Iwate prefecture.
- Toshidon, parallel practice in Koshikijima Islands, Kagoshima prefecture
- Yamahage in the former Yūwa, Akita, now part of Akita, Akita.

== See also ==
- Askeladden - Norwegian folklore character who abides by the fireplace
- Black Peter, a similar being who plays a similar role for Christmas celebrations in the Netherlands.
- Busójárás
- Kasedori, where men dress in taper-headed straw costume, in Kaminoyama, Yamagata
- Krampus, a demonic creature, believed to accompany Saint Nicholas to punish children in some European countries during Christmas.
- Kukeri
- Kurentovanje - Slovenian folklore carnival
- Latvian masked processions
- List of Important Intangible Folk Cultural Properties
- List of legendary creatures from Japan
- Ogoh-ogoh – demons of Bali who are celebrated on their new year.
- Straw bear
- Setsubun or mamemaki, practice of casting roasted soy beans to ward ogres or ghouls.
- Tsuina, a more ancient form of ghoul-warding passed down from China.
