= Oga Peninsula =

Peninsula in Akita Prefecture, Japan

Coordinates: 39°54′57″N 139°47′11″E

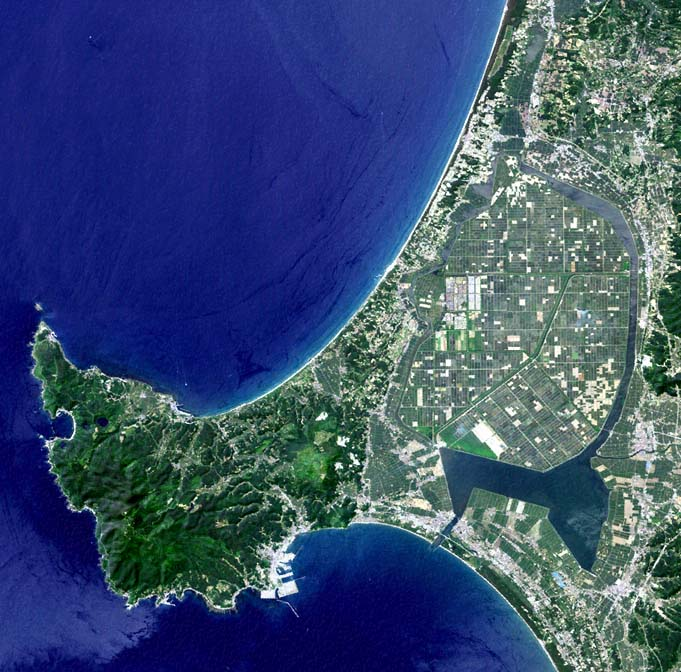
Oga Peninsula

Location of Oga Peninsula

The Oga Peninsula (男鹿半島 Oga-hantō) is a rugged peninsula which projects west into the Sea of Japan from the coast of Akita in northern Honshū, the main island of Japan. Politically it coincides with the city of Oga.

At the base of the peninsula is Hachirōgata, formerly the second largest lake in Japan.

Oga Peninsula is famous for the traditional festival of Namahage.

Until the 1970s, dugout canoes made from natural cedar were used for fishing on the Oga Peninsula. Since they have no joints and are durable, the canoes were useful in rocky areas of the peninsula.

== Gallery ==
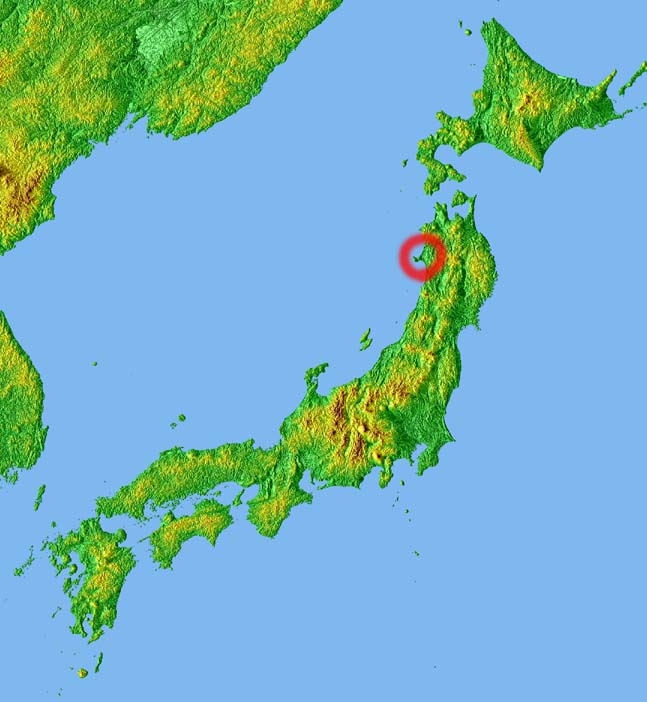
Location

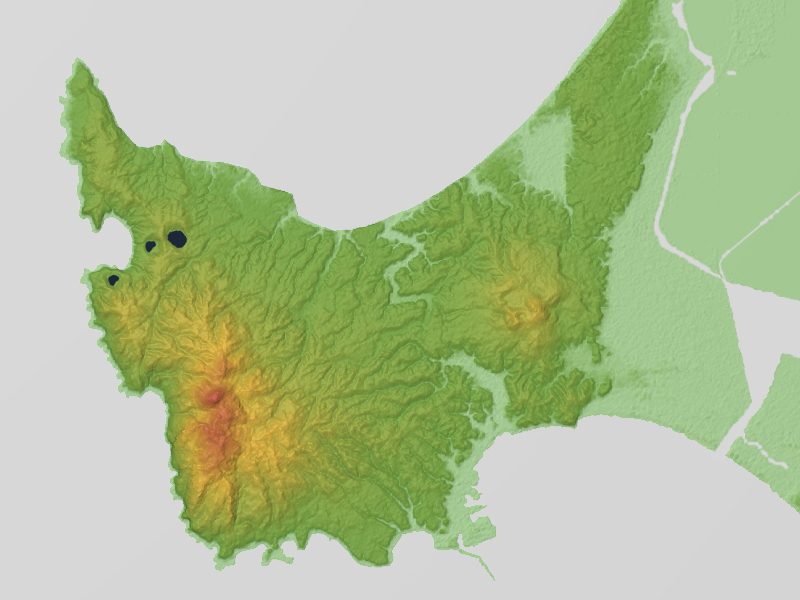
Relief Map

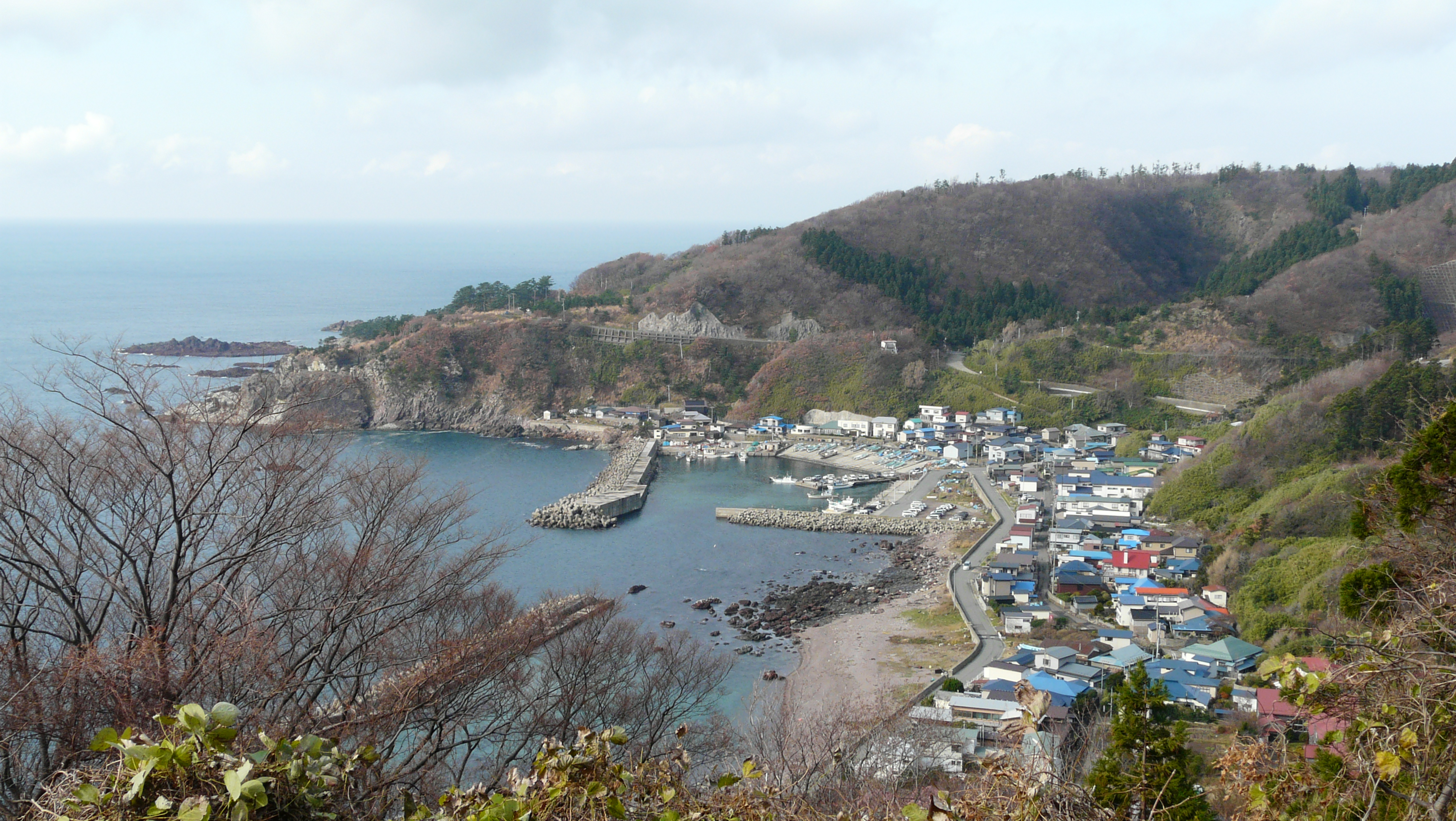
Kamo harbor

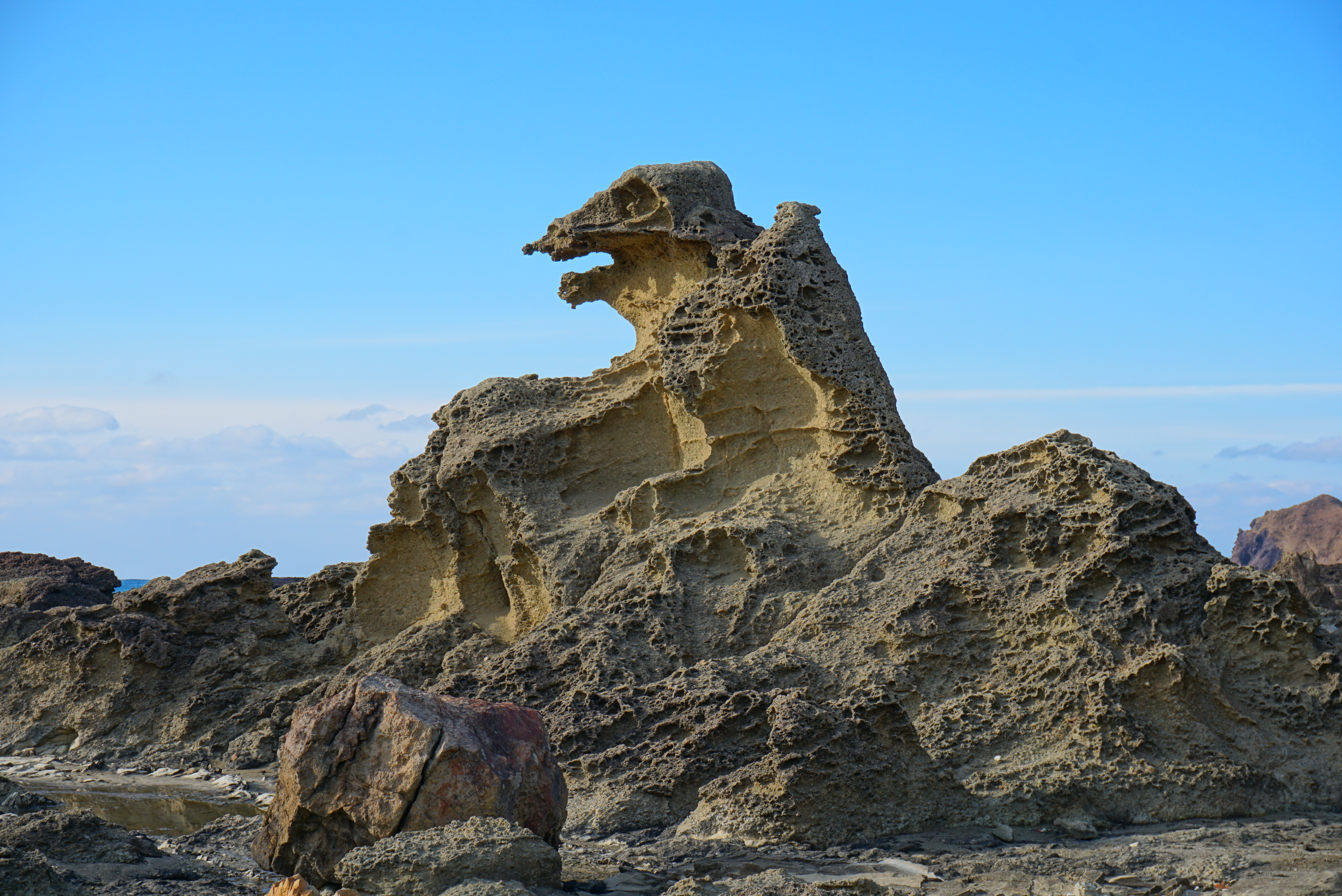
Godzilla Rock

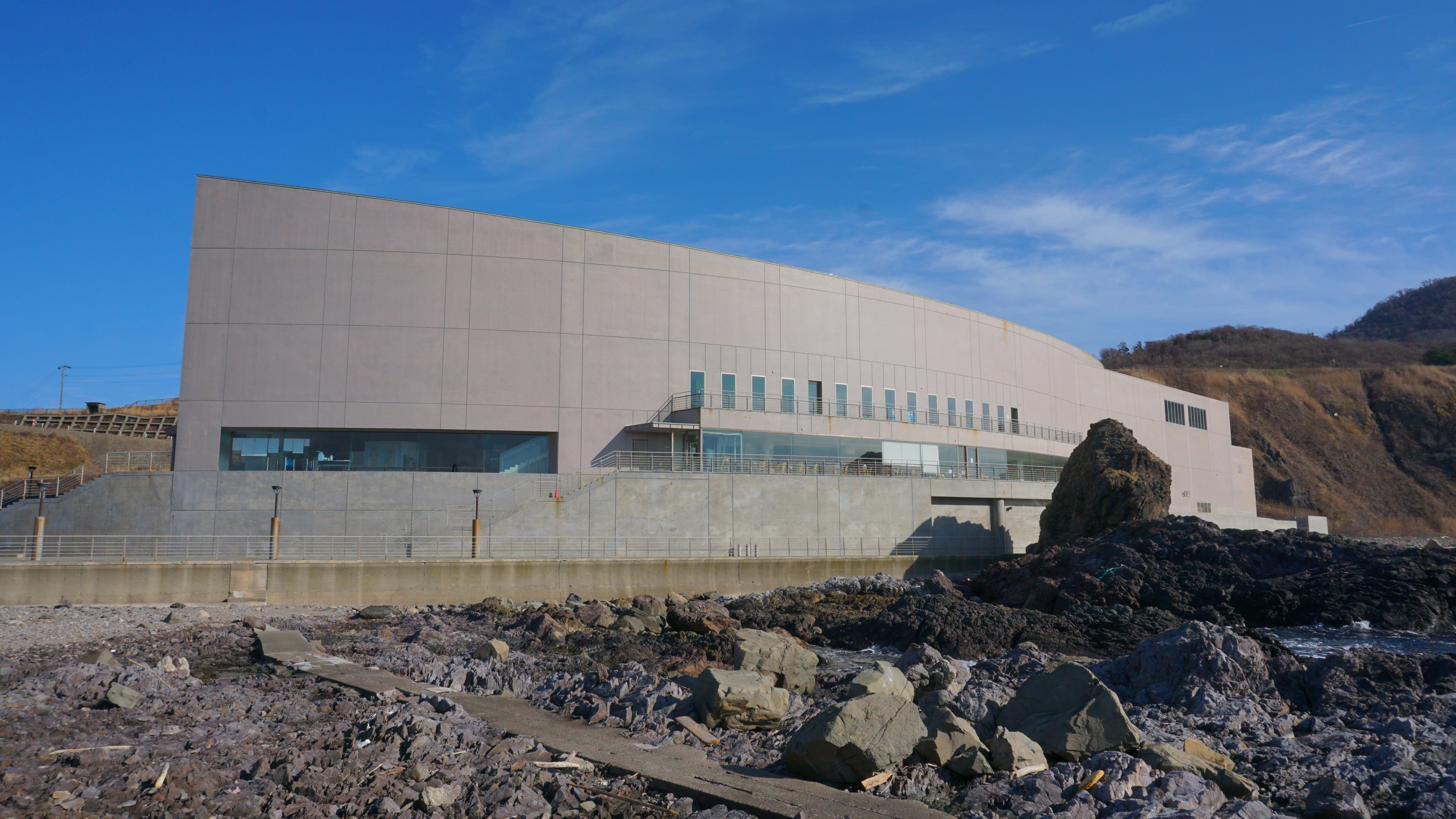
Oga Aquarium Gao

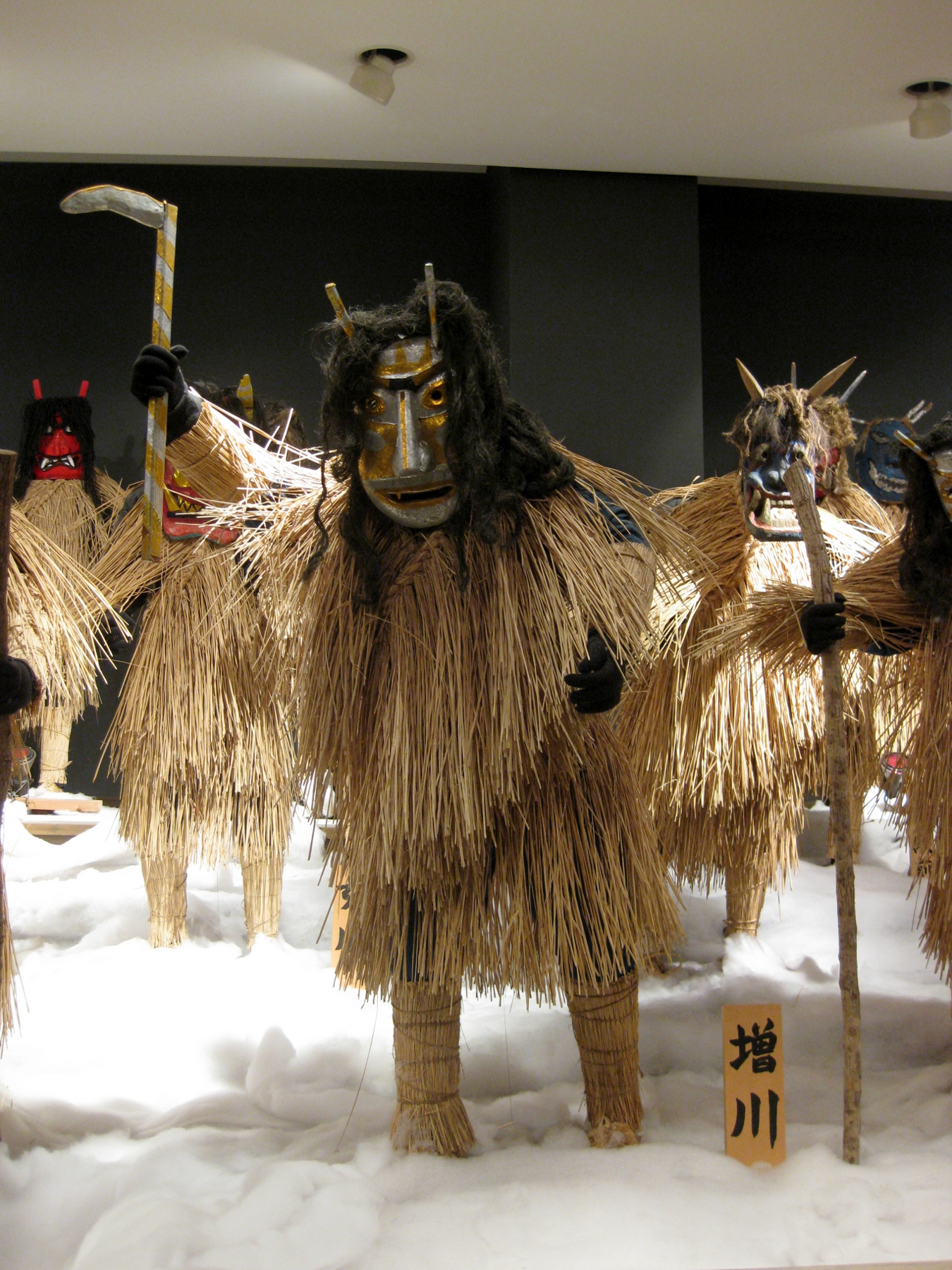
Namahage Museum

== See also ==
- Oga Aquarium Gao
- Wakimoto Castle
