= Terata =

Terata (written: 寺田) is a Japanese surname. Notable people with the surname include:

- Manabu Terata (寺田 学, born 1971), Japanese politician
- Sukeshiro Terata (寺田 典城, born 1940), Japanese politician
