= Akita High School =

- 秋田県立秋田高等学校
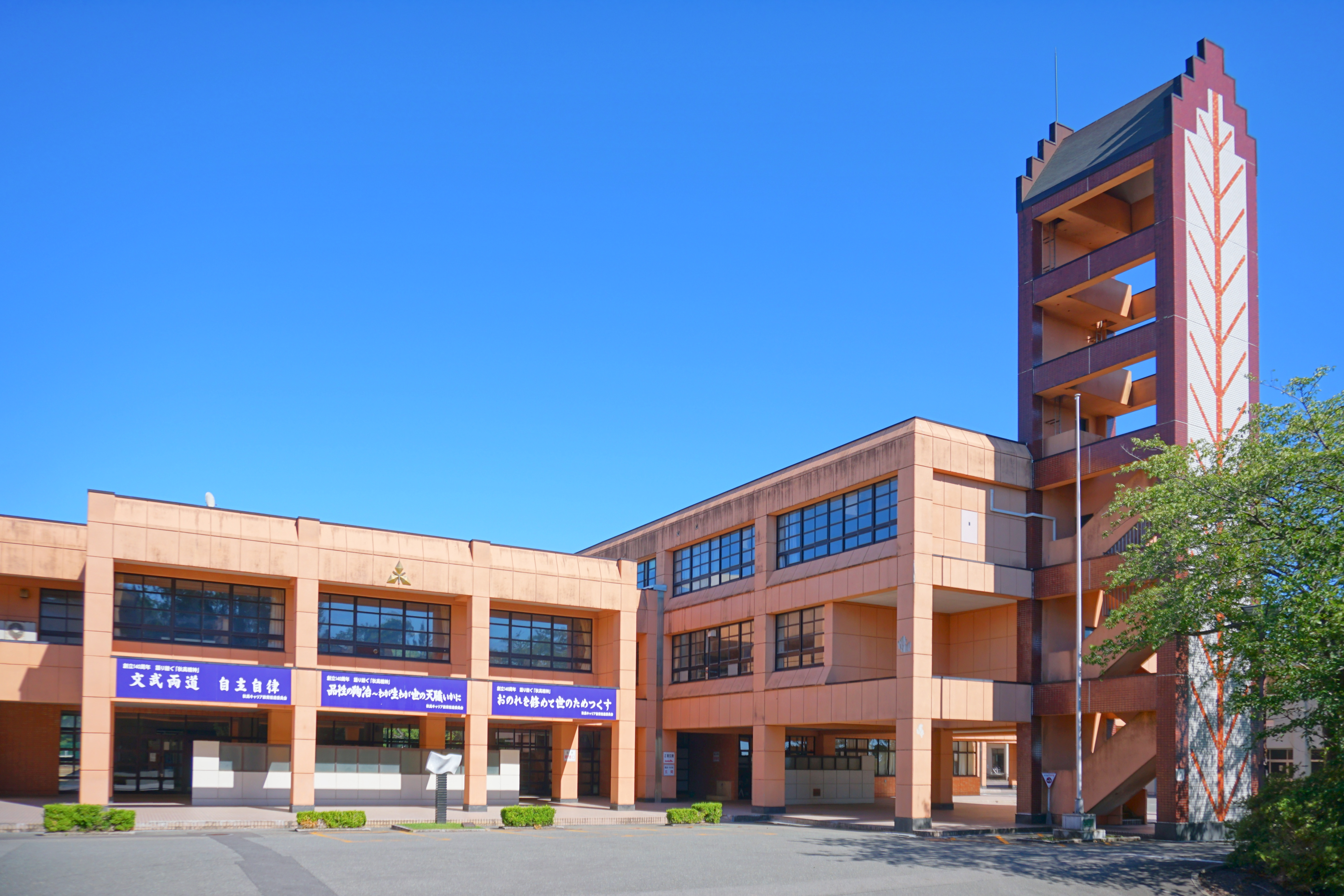

Location
- 1 Tegata aza Nakadai; Akita, Akita Prefecture; Japan; 39.736584°N 140.133947°E

Information
- Type: Prefectural Senior Co-educational
- Established: September 1, 1873
- School code: 05101C
- Grades: 1st-3rd years Senior High School
- Gender: Mixed
- Enrollment: 822 (2017)
- Color: Purple
- Nickname: Shuko
- Website: www.akita-h.akita-c.ed.jp

Akita High School (秋田県立秋田高等学校, Akita Kenritsu Akita Kōtō Gakkō) is a high school in the city of Akita, Akita Prefecture, Japan. Akita High is the oldest and first high school in the prefecture and one of the earliest pre-World War II middle schools in Japan.

== School activities ==
=== Athletics ===
==== Baseball ====
Runners-up, Japanese High School Baseball Championship in 1915.

==== Basketball ====
Won Japanese championship in 1936.

==== Mountaineering ====
3-time runners-up, Inter-High School Championships

==== Judo ====
Japanese champions in 1931, runners-up in 1938.

==== Kendo ====
2-time Japanese champions in 1967 and 1968.

== Notable alumni ==
- Shigeki Abe - baseball player
- Yasushi Akashi - United Nations administrator.
- Sasagu Arai - researcher of early Christianity
- Shirō Fukai - composer
- Kenzo Futaki - doctor
- Eiji Gotō - admiral
- Mitsutaka Goto- baseball player
- Hiroo Ishii - baseball player
- Shun-ichi Iwasaki - engineer
- Katsutoshi Kaneda - politician
- Kazuo Koike - manga writer
- Machida Chūji - politician
- Kazuo Nakamura (basketball) - head coach
- Shōji Nishimura - admiral
- Hitoshi Okuda - manga artist
- Taro Shoji - singer
- Sukenari Yokoyama - politician

== Gallery ==
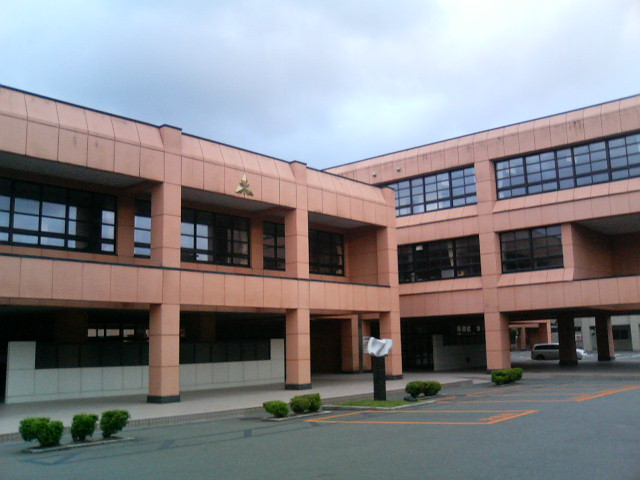

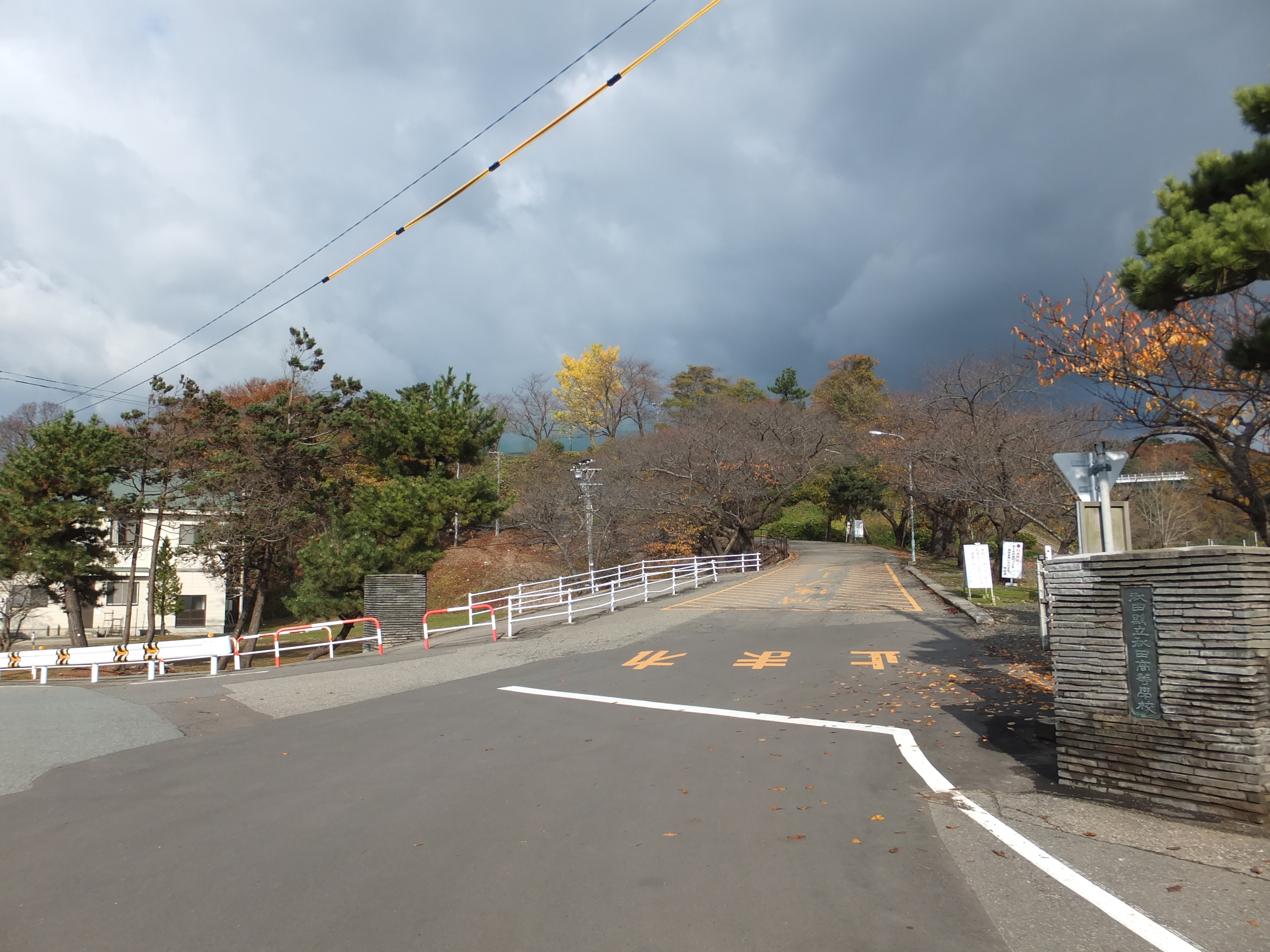
Bush warbler hill

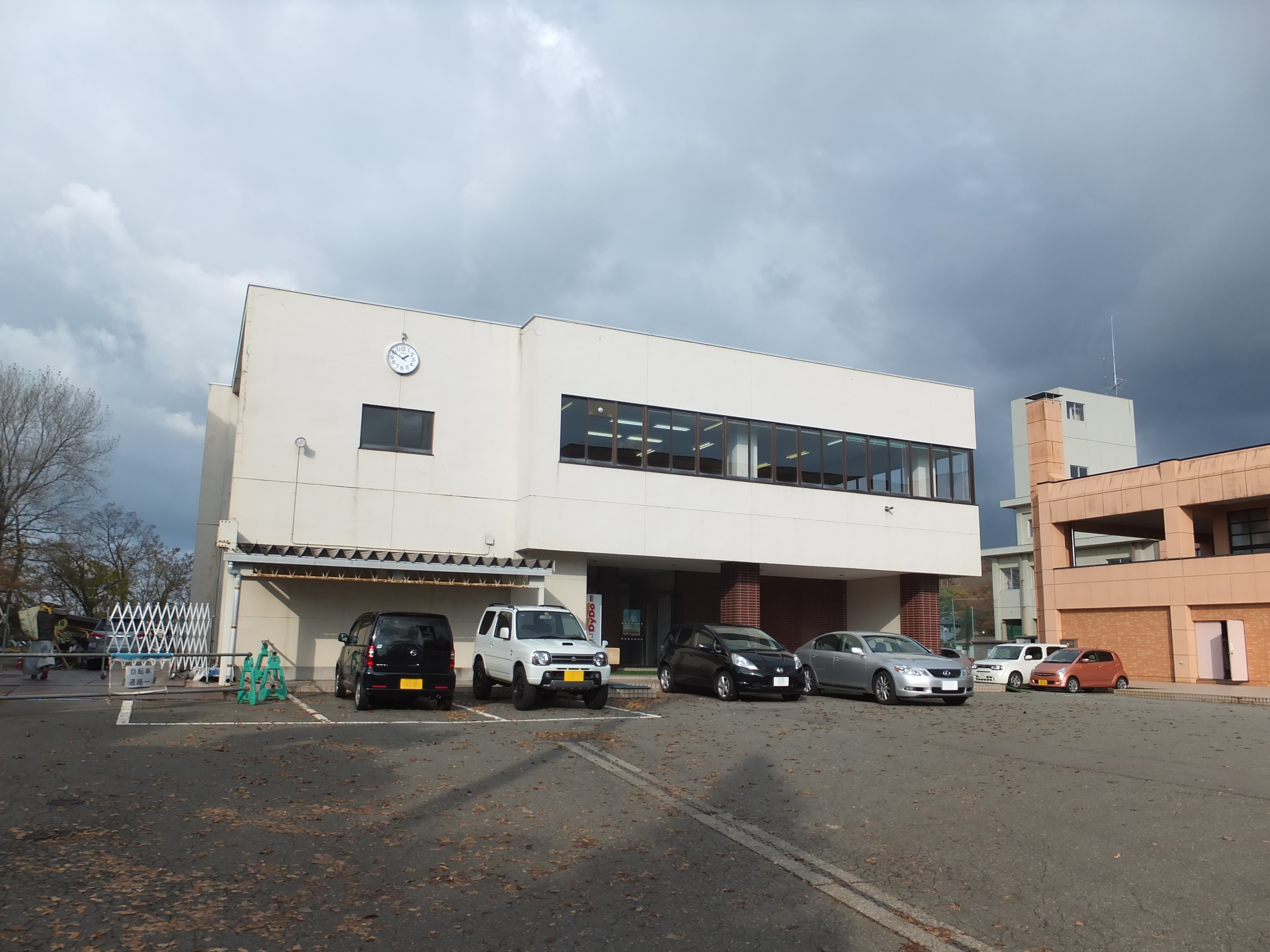

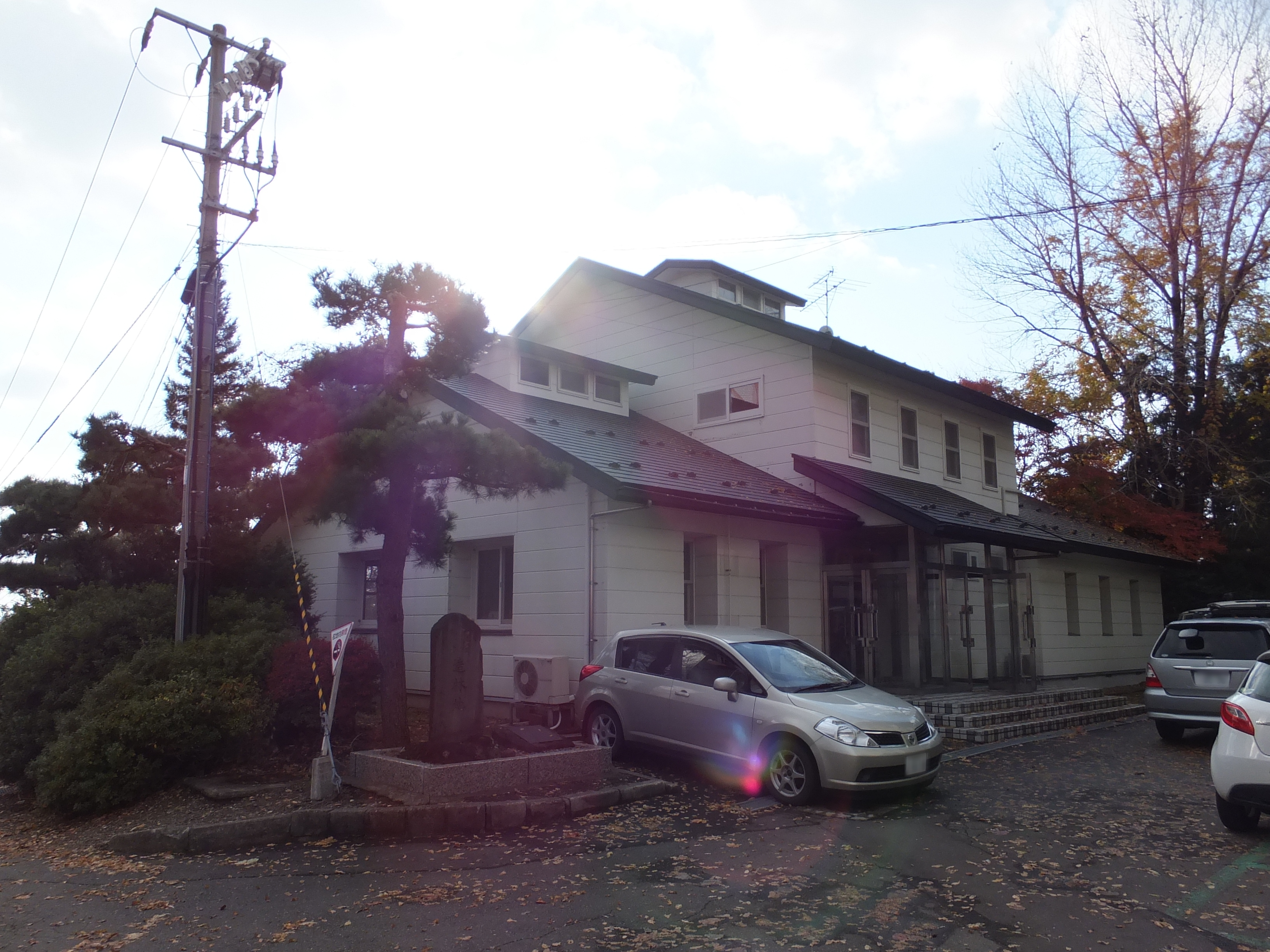

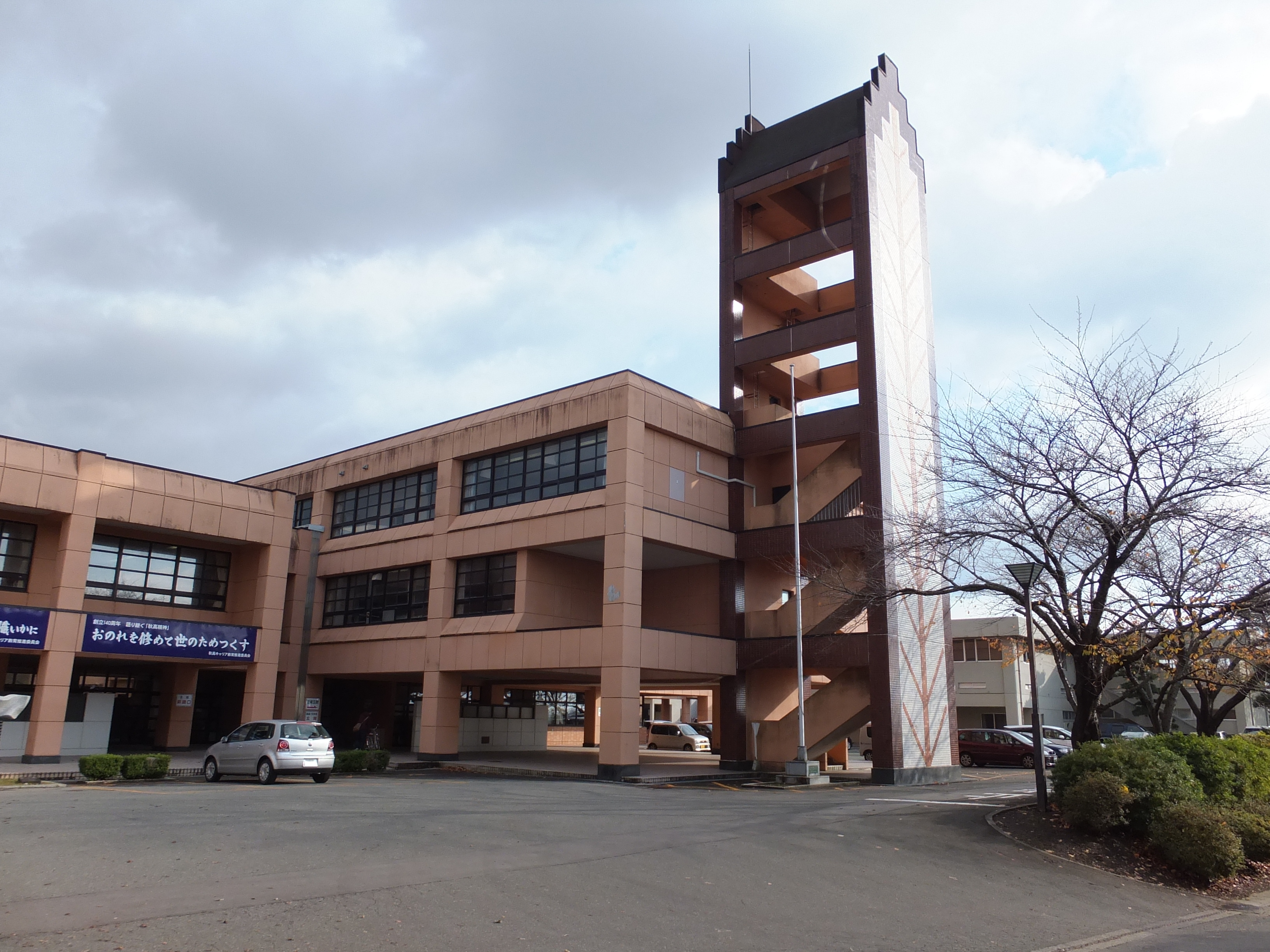

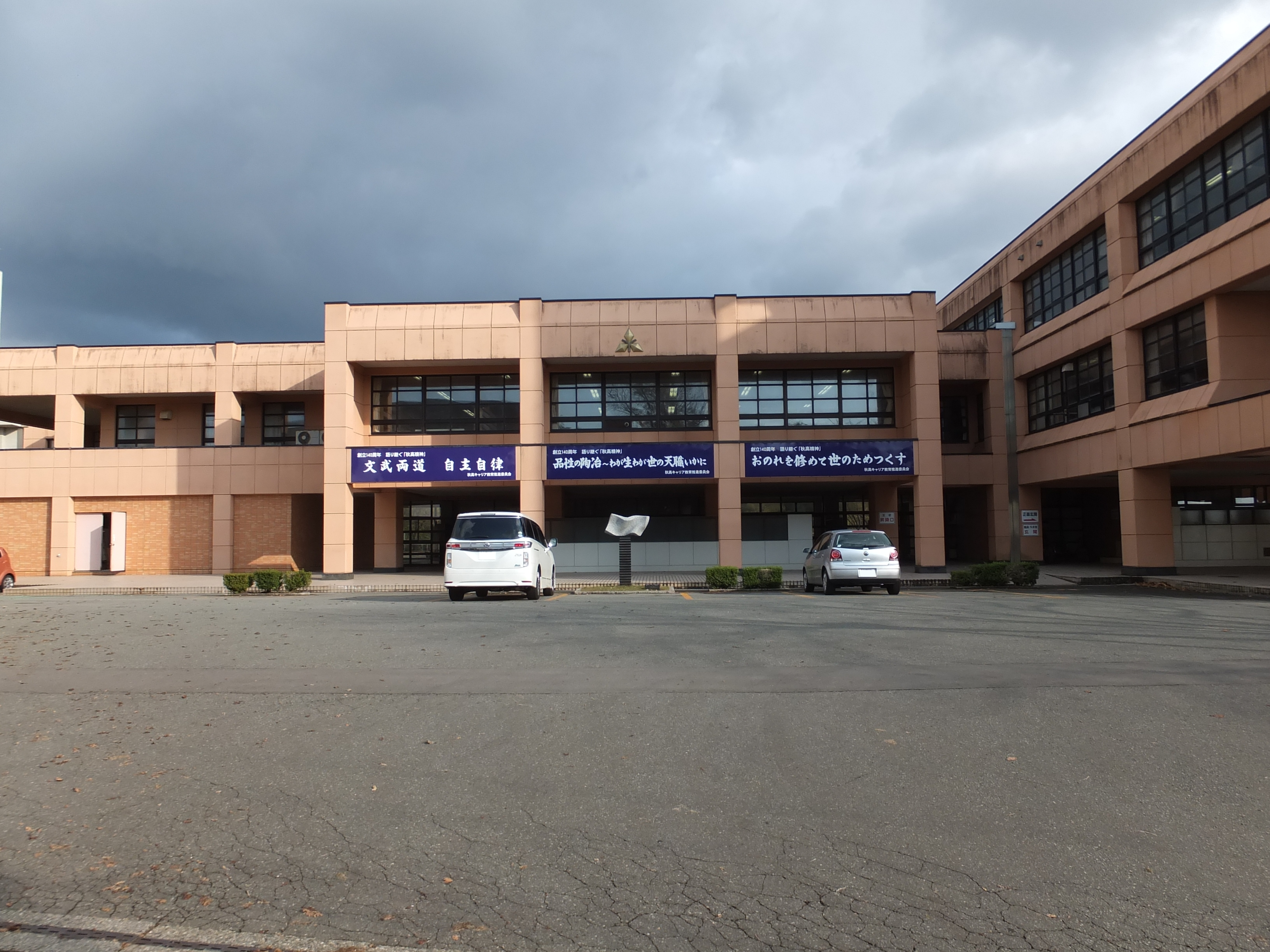

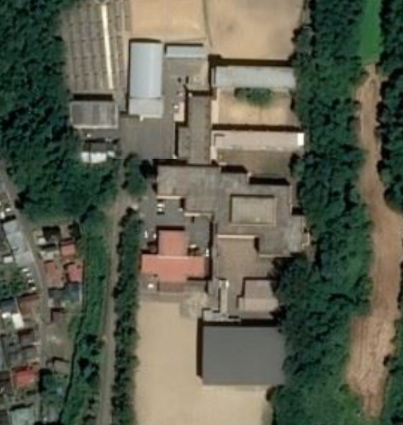
Satellite view
