= Tennō-mura =

Tennō-mura (天王村) may refer to one of several places in Japan.

- Tennō, in Akita, Minamiakita District. Also known as Tennō-machi. Present-day Katagami.
- Tennō, in Niigata, Kitakanbara District. Present-day Shibata.
- Tennō, in Shizuoka, Hamana District. Present-day Hamamatsu.
