= List of cities in Akita Prefecture by population =

The following list sorts all cities (including towns and villages) in the Japanese prefecture of Akita with a population of more than 5,000 according to the 2020 Census. As of October 1, 2020, 19 places fulfill this criterion and are listed here. This list refers only to the population of individual cities, towns and villages within their defined limits, which does not include other municipalities or suburban areas within urban agglomerations.

== List ==
The following table lists the 19 cities, towns and villages in Akita with a population of at least 5,000 on October 1, 2020, according to the 2020 Census. The table also gives an overview of the evolution of the population since the 1995 census.

Rank (2020)	Name	Status	2020	2015	2010	2005	2000	1995
1	Akita	City	307,885	315,814	323,600	333,109	336,646	331,597
2	Yokote	City	85,584	92,197	98,367	103,652	109,004	112,600
3	Daisen	City	77,715	82,783	88,301	93,352	98,326	100,879
4	Yurihonjō	City	74,763	79,927	85,229	89,555	92,843	94,410
5	Ōdate	City	69,280	74,175	78,946	82,504	86,288	88,231
6	Noshiro	City	50,005	54,730	59,084	62,858	65,237	67,816
7	Yuzawa	City	42,096	46,613	50,849	55,290	58,504	61,169
8	Katagami	City	31,743	33,083	34,442	35,814	35,711	34,660
9	Kitaakita	City	30,217	33,224	36,387	40,049	42,050	44,794
10	Kazuno	City	29,107	32,038	34,473	36,753	39,144	41,184
11	Oga	City	25,175	28,375	32,294	35,637	38,130	40,517
12	Semboku	City	24,629	27,523	29,568	31,868	33,565	34,945
13	Nikaho	City	23,455	25,324	27,544	28,972	30,347	31,336
14	Misato	Town	18,625	20,279	21,674	23,038	24,207	25,232
15	Mitane	Town	15,266	17,078	18,876	20,438	22,112	23,346
16	Ugo	Town	13,822	15,319	16,792	18,267	19,485	20,307
17	Gojōme	Town	8,544	9,463	10,516	11,678	12,372	13,371
18	Happō	Town	6,582	7,309	8,220	9,012	9,698	10,138
19	Hachirōgata	Town	5,582	6,080	6,623	7,093	7,533	7,768
