= Sumo at the 2001 World Games – Men's openweight =

Sumo men's openweight at the 2001 World Games
- Venue: Tenno Town Gymnasium, Tenno, Akita, Japan
- Dates: 25 August 2001
- Competitors: 13 from 13 nations

Medalists
gold medal	(Japan) Kenichi Yajima
silver medal	(Germany) Torsten Scheibler
bronze medal	(Czech Republic) Jaroslav Poříz

The men's openweight competition in sumo at the 2001 World Games took place on 25 August 2001 at the Tenno Town Gymnasium in Tenno, Akita, Japan.

== Competition format ==
A total of 13 athletes entered the competition. They fought in stepladder system.

== Results ==
=== Gold medal bracket ===
Round 1
(Tonga) Sione Fifita (TGA)	L
(Mongolia) Bayanbat Davaadalai (MGL)	W
(Japan) Kenichi Yajima (JPN)	W
(Russia) Alexander Boulanov (RUS)	L
(United States) Leonard Thomas (USA)	W
(Kazakhstan) Suyenesh Khudibayev (KAZ)	L
(Uzbekistan) Botir Khasanov (UZB)	W
(Estonia) Indrek Kohv (EST)	L
(Thailand) Phoophat Raksattrong (THA)	L
(Czech Republic) Jaroslav Poříz (CZE)	W

Quarterfinals
(Brazil) Marcel Moriy (BRA)	L
(Mongolia) Bayanbat Davaadalai (MGL)	W
(Chinese Taipei) Tseng Wen-feng (TPE)	L
(Japan) Kenichi Yajima (JPN)	W
(Germany) Torsten Scheibler (GER)	W
(United States) Leonard Thomas (USA)	L
(Uzbekistan) Botir Khasanov (UZB)	L
(Czech Republic) Jaroslav Poříz (CZE)	W

Semifinals
(Mongolia) Bayanbat Davaadalai (MGL)	L
(Japan) Kenichi Yajima (JPN)	W
(Germany) Torsten Scheibler (GER)	W
(Czech Republic) Jaroslav Poříz (CZE)	L

Final
(Japan) Kenichi Yajima (JPN)	W
(Germany) Torsten Scheibler (GER)	L

=== Bronze medal bracket ===
Round 1
(Tonga) Sione Fifita (TGA)	W
(Brazil) Marcel Moriy (BRA)	L
(Russia) Alexander Boulanov (RUS)	L
(Chinese Taipei) Tseng Wen-feng (TPE)	W
(Thailand) Phoophat Raksattrong (THA)	L
(Uzbekistan) Botir Khasanov (UZB)	W

Round 2
(Tonga) Sione Fifita (TGA)	L
(Chinese Taipei) Tseng Wen-feng (TPE)	W
(Czech Republic) Jaroslav Poříz (CZE)
Bye
(Mongolia) Bayanbat Davaadalai (MGL)
Bye
(United States) Leonard Thomas (USA)	L
(Uzbekistan) Botir Khasanov (UZB)	W

Semifinals
(Chinese Taipei) Tseng Wen-feng (TPE)	L
(Czech Republic) Jaroslav Poříz (CZE)	W
(Mongolia) Bayanbat Davaadalai (MGL)	W
(Uzbekistan) Botir Khasanov (UZB)	L

Bronze medal match
(Czech Republic) Jaroslav Poříz (CZE)	W
(Mongolia) Bayanbat Davaadalai (MGL)	L
