= Akita 1st district =

Japan House of Representatives constituency

Map of electoral districts in Akita prefecture

Akita 1st district is a single-member constituency of the House of Representatives, the lower house of the National Diet of Japan. It is located in the Tōhoku region of the island of Honshu, in Akita Prefecture. The district contains the entirety of the city of Akita, making it the only district in Tōhoku to entirely contain a single municipality.

As of February 8, 2026, the district was home to 251,935 constituents.

The district is represented by Hiroyuki Togashi of the Liberal Democratic Party.

== List of representatives ==
Representative	Party	Dates	Notes
Takao Satō	NFP	1996 – 2000	
Koji Futada	LDP	2000 – 2003	
Manabu Terata	DPJ	2003 – 2012	
Hiroyuki Togashi	LDP	2012 -	

== Election results ==
2026
Party	Candidate	Votes	%	±%
LDP	Hiroyuki Togashi	65,940	46.5	▲4.8
DPP	Sachiko Kimura	25,510	18	
Centrist Reform	Shusaku Hayakawa	22,665	16	
Ishin	Daigo Matsuura	14,843	10.5	▼1.9
Sanseitō	Miwako Sato	7,645	5.4	
JCP	Satoshi Suzuki	5,246	3.7	▼1.1
Turnout		141,849	56.82	▼0.73
LDP hold				

2024
Party	Candidate	Votes	%	±%
LDP	Hiroyuki Togashi	60,387	41.7	▼10.2
CDP	Manabu Terata (won a seat in PR block)	59,515	41.1	▼7.0
Ishin	Daigo Matsuura	17,865	12.4	
JCP	Satoshi Suzuki	6,875	4.8	
Turnout			57.55	▼0.63
LDP hold				

2021
Party	Candidate	Votes	%	±%
LDP	Hiroyuki Togashi	77,960	51.9	▼1.2
CDP	Manabu Terata (won a seat in PR block)	72,366	48.1	
Turnout			58.18	▲1.78
LDP hold				

2017
Party	Candidate	Votes	%	±%
LDP	Hiroyuki Togashi	79,442	53.7	▲6.7
Kibō no Tō	Daigo Matsuura	53,850	36.4	
JCP	Daigo Saitō	14,584	9.9	▲1.7
Turnout			56.40	▲2.32
LDP hold				

2014
Party	Candidate	Votes	%	±%
LDP	Hiroyuki Togashi	66,388	47.0	▲0.3
Democratic	Manabu Terata (won a seat in PR block)	57,782	40.9	▲9.5
JCP	Umeyoshi Yamauchi	11,579	8.2	▲2.2
Social Democratic	Masamichi Itō	5,441	3.9	
Turnout			54.08	▼5.85
LDP hold				

2012
Party	Candidate	Votes	%	±%
LDP	Hiroyuki Togashi	73,356	46.7	▲12.3
Democratic	Manabu Terata	49,243	31.4	▼20.5
Restoration	Nobuhiro Ōmiya	15,333	9.8	
Tomorrow	Kazuo Takamatsu	9,702	6.2	
JCP	Yoshio Satake	9,414	6.0	▼2.8
Turnout			59.93	
LDP gain from Democratic				

2009
Party	Candidate	Votes	%	±%
Democratic	Manabu Terata	93,097	51.9	▲7.5
LDP	Kōji Futada	61,752	34.4	▼5.0
JCP	Satoshi Suzuki	15,830	8.8	▲1.1
Independent	Yōkō Fujii	7,353	4.1	
Happiness Realization	Yukihiro Tsuruta	1,472	0.8	
Turnout				▼
Democratic hold				

2005
Party	Candidate	Votes	%	±%
Democratic	Manabu Terata	77,135	44.4	▲0.3
LDP	Kōji Futada (won a seat in PR block)	68,526	39.4	
People's New	Renjirō Ishikawa	14,751	8.5	▼7.2
JCP	Kazunobu Imakawa	13,334	7.7	▼0.5
Turnout				▲
Democratic hold				

2003
Party	Candidate	Votes	%	±%
Democratic	Manabu Terata	68,586	44.1	▲0.3
New Conservative	Takao Satō	49,777	32.0	▼11.8
Independent	Renjirō Ishikawa	24,382	15.7	
JCP	Kazunobu Imakawa	12,713	8.2	▲0.5
Turnout				
Democratic gain from LDP				

2000
Party	Candidate	Votes	%	±%
LDP	Kōji Futada	101,848	44.0	▲3.6
Democratic	Takao Satō (won a seat in PR block)	101,313	43.8	▼1.7
JCP	Kazunobu Imakawa	17,738	7.7	▼6.4
Liberal	Katsuo Funakawa	10,463	4.5	
Turnout				
LDP gain from New Frontier				

1996
Party	Candidate	Votes	%	±%
New Frontier	Takao Satō	95,194	45.5	
LDP	Kōji Futada	84,625	40.4	
JCP	Kazuko Ogiwara	29,514	14.1	
Turnout			62.83	▼7.89
