= Hiroo Ishii =

Japanese baseball player

- 石井 浩郎
- Official portrait, 2015

Member of the House of Councillors
- Incumbent
- Assumed office 26 July 2010
- Preceded by: Yoetsu Suzuki
- Constituency: Akita at-large

Personal details
- Born: 21 June 1964 (age 62) Hachirōgata, Akita, Japan
- Party: Liberal Democratic
- Education: Akita High School; Waseda University
- Baseball career
- Batted: Right Threw: Right

NPB debut
- May 8, 1990, for the Kintetsu Buffaloes

Last appearance
- October 4, 2002, for the Yokohama BayStars

NPB statistics
- Batting average: .289
- Home runs: 162
- Runs batted in: 536

Teams
- Kintetsu Buffaloes (1990–1996); Yomiuri Giants (1997–1999); Chiba Lotte Marines (2000–2001); Yokohama BayStars (2002)

Hiroo Ishii (石井 浩郎, Ishii Hiroo; born 21 June 1964) is a Japanese retired baseball player and politician from the Liberal Democratic Party of Japan. He currently serves as member of the House of Councillors for Akita at-large district.
