= Sumo at the 2001 World Games – Women's team =

Sumo women's team at the 2001 World Games
- Venue: Tenno Town Gymnasium, Tenno, Akita, Japan
- Dates: 26 August 2001
- Nations: 5

Medalists
gold medal	Russia
silver medal	Estonia
bronze medal	Japan

The women's team competition in sumo at the 2001 World Games took place on 26 August 2001 at the Tenno Town Gymnasium in Tenno, Akita, Japan.

== Competition format ==
A total of 6 teams entered the competition. They fought in stepladder system.

== Results ==
=== Gold medal bracket ===
Quarterfinals
(Japan) Akita Select Team	1
Thailand	2
Japan	2
Germany	1

Semifinals
Russia	W
Thailand	L
Estonia	W
Japan	L

Final
Russia	2
Estonia	1

=== Bronze medal bracket ===
Consolation round
Japan	3
(Japan) Akita Select Team	0
Thailand	1
Germany	2

Third place
Japan	2
Germany	1
