= Sumo at the 2001 World Games – Men's lightweight =

Sumo men's lightweight at the 2001 World Games
- Venue: Tenno Town Gymnasium, Tenno, Akita, Japan
- Dates: 25 August 2001
- Competitors: 6 from 6 nations

Medalists
gold medal	(Japan) Chohei Kimura
silver medal	(Germany) Peer Schmidt-Düwiger
bronze medal	(Mongolia) Lodoijamtsyn Bat-Erdene

The men's lightweight competition in sumo at the 2001 World Games took place on 25 August 2001 at the Tenno Town Gymnasium in Tenno, Akita, Japan.

== Competition format ==
A total of 6 athletes entered the competition. They fought in stepladder system.

== Results ==
=== Gold medal bracket ===
Quarterfinals
(Germany) Peer Schmidt-Düwiger (GER)	W
(Paraguay) Daniel Nakatsuka (PAR)	L
(Chinese Taipei) Chen Yi-shun (TPE)	L
(Japan) Chohei Kimura (JPN)	W

Semifinals
(Tonga) Siaosi Falevai (TGA)	L
(Germany) Peer Schmidt-Düwiger (GER)	W
(Mongolia) Lodoijamtsyn Bat-Erdene (MGL)	L
(Japan) Chohei Kimura (JPN)	W

Final
(Germany) Peer Schmidt-Düwiger (GER)	L
(Japan) Chohei Kimura (JPN)	W

=== Bronze medal bracket ===
Consolation round
(Mongolia) Lodoijamtsyn Bat-Erdene (MGL)	W
(Paraguay) Daniel Nakatsuka (PAR)	L
(Tonga) Siaosi Falevai (TGA)	L
(Chinese Taipei) Chen Yi-shun (TPE)	W

Third place
(Mongolia) Lodoijamtsyn Bat-Erdene (MGL)	W
(Chinese Taipei) Chen Yi-shun (TPE)	L
