= Karate at the 2001 World Games – Men's kumite 70 kg =

Karate men's kumite 70 kg at the 2001 World Games
- Venue: Tenno Town Gymnasium, Tenno, Akita, Japan
- Dates: 18 August 2001
- Competitors: 7 from 6 nations

Medalists
gold medal	(Japan) Yasuhisa Inada
silver medal	(Japan) Yoshinori Matsumoto
bronze medal	(Egypt) Hussein El-Desouky

The men's kumite 70 kg competition in karate at the 2001 World Games took place on 18 August 2001 at the Tenno Town Gymnasium in Tenno, Akita, Japan.

== Competition format ==
A total of 7 athletes entered the competition. In preliminary round they fought in two groups. Winners of this groups advanced to gold medal match. Second place athletes advanced to bronze medal match.

== Results ==
=== Preliminary round ===
==== Group A ====
Rank	Athlete	B	W	D	L	Pts	SP	JPN	SEN	VEN
1	Yasuhisa Inada (JPN)	2	1	1	0	3	10		D	W
2	Ndao Fode (SEN)	2	1	1	0	3	5	D		W
3	Jose Ignacio Perez (VEN)	2	0	0	2	0	6	L	L	
	Gustaaf Lefevre (CRO)	DNS								

==== Group B ====
Rank	Athlete	B	W	D	L	Pts	SP	JPN	EGY	AUS
1	Yoshinori Matsumoto (JPN)	2	2	0	0	4	10		W	W
2	Hussein El-Desouky (EGY)	2	1	0	1	2	4	L		W
3	Matthew Johnson (AUS)	2	0	0	2	0	3	L	L	

=== Finals ===
	Score	
Gold medal match
Yasuhisa Inada (JPN)	12−11	Yoshinori Matsumoto (JPN)
Bronze medal match
Ndao Fode (SEN)	1−1	Hussein El-Desouky (EGY)
