= Sumo at the 2001 World Games – Men's heavyweight =

Sumo men's heavyweight at the 2001 World Games
- Venue: Tenno Town Gymnasium, Tenno, Akita, Japan
- Dates: 25 August 2001
- Competitors: 14 from 14 nations

Medalists
gold medal	(Germany) Jörg Brümmer
silver medal	(Estonia) Jüri Uustalu
bronze medal	(Japan) Takahisa Osanai

The men's heavyweight competition in sumo at the 2001 World Games took place on 25 August 2001 at the Tenno Town Gymnasium in Tenno, Akita, Japan.

== Competition format ==
A total of 14 athletes entered the competition. They fought in stepladder system.

== Results ==
=== Gold medal bracket ===
Round 1
(Kazakhstan) Aidyn Ramazanov (KAZ)	L
(Estonia) Jüri Uustalu (EST)	W
(Paraguay) Susumu Omae (PAR)	W
(Thailand) Veeris Tholsuwan (THA)	L
(Brazil) Julio Guerra (BRA)	L
(Russia) Vladimir Antonov (RUS)	W
(Chinese Taipei) Hsieh Po-chuan (TPE)	L
(Germany) Jörg Brümmer (GER)	W
(Uzbekistan) Erali Makhmarasulov (UZB)	L
(Japan) Takahisa Osanai (JPN)	W
(Czech Republic) Jan Zatrepalek (CZE)	L
(United States) James Perry (USA)	W

Quarterfinals
(Tonga) Tekiera Aukafolau (TGA)	L
(Estonia) Jüri Uustalu (EST)	W
(Paraguay) Susumu Omae (PAR)	W
(Russia) Vladimir Antonov (RUS)	L
(Mongolia) Tseden-Damba Bayarsaikhan (MGL)	L
(Germany) Jörg Brümmer (GER)	W
(Japan) Takahisa Osanai (JPN)	L
(United States) James Perry (USA)	W

Semifinals
(Estonia) Jüri Uustalu (EST)	W
(Paraguay) Susumu Omae (PAR)	L
(Germany) Jörg Brümmer (GER)	W
(United States) James Perry (USA)	L

Final
(Estonia) Jüri Uustalu (EST)	L
(Germany) Jörg Brümmer (GER)	W

=== Bronze medal bracket ===
Round 1
(Kazakhstan) Aidyn Ramazanov (KAZ)	L
(Tonga) Tekiera Aukafolau (TGA)	W
(Brazil) Julio Guerra (BRA)	W
(Paraguay) Susumu Omae (PAR)	L
(Chinese Taipei) Hsieh Po-chuan (TPE)	L
(Mongolia) Tseden-Damba Bayarsaikhan (MGL)	W
(Czech Republic) Jan Zatrepalek (CZE)	L
(Japan) Takahisa Osanai (JPN)	W

Round 2
(Tonga) Tekiera Aukafolau (TGA)	W
(Brazil) Julio Guerra (BRA)	L
(United States) James Perry (USA)
Bye
(Russia) Vladimir Antonov (RUS)
Bye
(Mongolia) Tseden-Damba Bayarsaikhan (MGL)	L
(Japan) Takahisa Osanai (JPN)	W

Semifinals
(Tonga) Tekiera Aukafolau (TGA)	L
(United States) James Perry (USA)	W
(Russia) Vladimir Antonov (RUS)	L
(Japan) Takahisa Osanai (JPN)	W

Bronze medal match
(United States) James Perry (USA)	L
(Japan) Takahisa Osanai (JPN)	W
