= Karate at the 2001 World Games – Men's kumite +80 kg =

Karate men's kumite +80 kg at the 2001 World Games
- Venue: Tenno Town Gymnasium, Tenno, Akita, Japan
- Dates: 19 August 2001
- Competitors: 8 from 7 nations

Medalists
gold medal	(France) Seydina Baldé
silver medal	(Italy) Stefano Maniscalco
bronze medal	(United Kingdom) Leon Walters

The men's kumite +80 kg competition in karate at the 2001 World Games took place on 19 August 2001 at the Tenno Town Gymnasium in Tenno, Akita, Japan.

== Competition format ==
A total of 8 athletes entered the competition. In preliminary round they fought in two groups. Winners of this groups advanced to gold medal match. Second place athletes advanced to bronze medal match.

== Results ==
=== Preliminary round ===
==== Group A ====
Rank	Athlete	B	W	D	L	Pts	SP	ITA	TUN	JPN	IRI
1	Stefano Maniscalco (ITA)	3	3	0	0	6	24		W	W	W
2	Hannibal Jegham (TUN)	3	2	0	1	4	8	L		W	W
3	Sawanori Matsuzaki (JPN)	3	1	0	2	2	15	L	L		W
4	Mehran Behnamfar (IRI)	3	0	0	3	0	10	L	L	L	

==== Group B ====
Rank	Athlete	B	W	D	L	Pts	SP	FRA	GBR	SEN
1	Seydina Baldé (FRA)	2	2	0	0	4	10		W	W
2	Leon Walters (GBR)	2	1	0	1	2	7	L		W
3	Ndiaye Ali (SEN)	2	0	0	2	0	2	L	L	
	Davide Benetello (ITA)	DNS								

=== Finals ===
	Score	
Gold medal match
Stefano Maniscalco (ITA)	0−6	Seydina Baldé (FRA)
Bronze medal match
Hannibal Jegham (TUN)	0−2	Leon Walters (GBR)
