= Sumo at the 2001 World Games – Women's lightweight =

Sumo women's lightweight at the 2001 World Games
- Venue: Tenno Town Gymnasium, Tenno, Akita, Japan
- Dates: 25 August 2001
- Competitors: 10 from 4 nations

Medalists
gold medal	(Germany) Astrid Lixenfeld
silver medal	(Japan) Satomi Ishigaya
bronze medal	(Russia) Natalia Bobkina

The women's lightweight competition in sumo at the 2001 World Games took place on 25 August 2001 at the Tenno Town Gymnasium in Tenno, Akita, Japan.

== Competition format ==
A total of 10 athletes entered the competition. They fought in stepladder system.

== Results ==
=== Gold medal bracket ===
Round 1
(Thailand) Chumsakol Bussadee (THA)	L
(Japan) Izumi Morikawa (JPN)	W
(Thailand) Nantika Naphachai (THA)	L
(Germany) Anika Schulze (GER)	W

Quarterfinals
(Japan) Chika Kondo (JPN)	L
(Thailand) Alisa Promthong (THA)	W
(Germany) Astrid Lixenfeld (GER)	W
(Japan) Izumi Morikawa (JPN)	L
(Russia) Natalia Bobkina (RUS)	W
(Japan) Yumi Sugimoto (JPN)	L
(Japan) Satomi Ishigaya (JPN)	W
(Germany) Anika Schulze (GER)	L

Semifinals
(Thailand) Alisa Promthong (THA)	L
(Germany) Astrid Lixenfeld (GER)	W
(Russia) Natalia Bobkina (RUS)	L
(Japan) Satomi Ishigaya (JPN)	W

Final
(Germany) Astrid Lixenfeld (GER)	W
(Japan) Satomi Ishigaya (JPN)	L

=== Bronze medal bracket ===
Round 1
(Japan) Chika Kondo (JPN)	L
(Japan) Izumi Morikawa (JPN)	W
(Japan) Yumi Sugimoto (JPN)	L
(Germany) Anika Schulze (GER)	W

Semifinals
(Japan) Izumi Morikawa (JPN)	L
(Russia) Natalia Bobkina (RUS)	W
(Thailand) Alisa Promthong (THA)	L
(Germany) Anika Schulze (GER)	W

Bronze medal match
(Russia) Natalia Bobkina (RUS)	W
(Germany) Anika Schulze (GER)	L
