= Karate at the 2001 World Games – Men's kumite 75 kg =

Karate men's kumite 75 kg at the 2001 World Games
- Venue: Tenno Town Gymnasium, Tenno, Akita, Japan
- Dates: 18 August 2001
- Competitors: 7 from 7 nations

Medalists
| gold medal | (Italy) Gennaro Talarico |
| silver medal | (Japan) Takahiro Niki |
| bronze medal | (Bosnia and Herzegovina) Adnan Hadžić |

The men's kumite 75 kg competition in karate at the 2001 World Games took place on 18 August 2001 at the Tenno Town Gymnasium in Tenno, Akita, Japan.

== Competition format ==
A total of 7 athletes entered the competition. In preliminary round they fought in two groups. Winners of this groups advanced to gold medal match. Second place athletes advanced to bronze medal match.

== Results ==
=== Preliminary round ===
==== Group A ====
| Rank | Athlete | B | W | D | L | Pts | SP | JPN | GER | AUS | MEX |
|---|---|---|---|---|---|---|---|---|---|---|---|
| 1 | Takahiro Niki (JPN) | 3 | 3 | 0 | 0 | 6 | 13 | | W | W | W |
| 2 | Fadi Chaabo (GER) | 3 | 2 | 0 | 1 | 4 | 8 | L | | W | W |
| 3 | Cameron Frost (AUS) | 3 | 1 | 0 | 2 | 2 | 6 | L | L | | W |
| 4 | Eduardo Munoz (MEX) | 3 | 0 | 0 | 3 | 0 | 6 | L | L | L | |

==== Group B ====
| Rank | Athlete | B | W | D | L | Pts | SP | ITA | BIH | ESA |
|---|---|---|---|---|---|---|---|---|---|---|
| 1 | Gennaro Talarico (ITA) | 2 | 2 | 0 | 0 | 4 | 6 | | W | W |
| 2 | Adnan Hadžić (BIH) | 2 | 1 | 0 | 1 | 2 | 11 | L | | W |
| 3 | Juan Salmeron (ESA) | 2 | 0 | 0 | 2 | 0 | 0 | L | L | |

=== Finals ===
| | Score | |
Gold medal match
| Takahiro Niki (JPN) | 0−2 | Gennaro Talarico (ITA) |
Bronze medal match
| Fadi Chaabo (GER) | 1−6 | Adnan Hadžić (BIH) |
