= Shōwa, Akita =

Shōwa 昭和町
- Former settlement
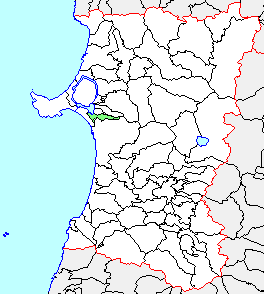
- Interactive map of Shōwa
- Country: Japan
- Prefecture: Akita
- District: Minamiakita

Shōwa (昭和町, Shōwa-machi) was a town located in Minamiakita District, Akita Prefecture, Japan.

In 2003, the town had an estimated population of 8,685 and a density of 213.65 persons per km^{2}. The total area was 40.65 km^{2}.

On March 22, 2005, Shōwa, along with the towns of Iitagawa and Tennō (all from Minamiakita District), merged to create the city of Katagami.

== Noted people from Showa ==
- Ikuo Nakamura, photographer
- Kazushi Sakuraba, mixed martial artist
- Kenichi Takahashi (basketball), basketball player
