= Shizuka Terata =

Japanese politician

- 寺田 静
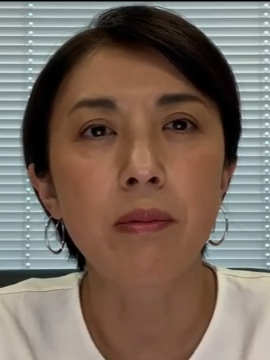

Member of the House of Councillors
- Incumbent
- Assumed office 29 July 2019
- Preceded by: Matsuji Nakaizumi
- Constituency: Akita at-large

Personal details
- Born: 23 March 1975 (age 51) Yokote, Akita, Japan
- Party: Independent
- Spouse: Manabu Terata (m. 2009)
- Relations: Sukeshiro Terata (father-in-law)
- Education: Waseda University
- Website: Terata Shizuka Official Website

Shizuka Terata is a Japanese politician who is a member of the House of Councillors of Japan.

== Biography ==
Born on March 23, 1975, Akita Prefecture, she graduated in 1998 from Waseda University, School of Human Science. Later, she worked at the University of Tokyo. She was elected in 2019.
