= Iitagawa, Akita =

Dissolved municipality in Akita prefecture, Japan

Iitagawa (飯田川町, Iitagawa-machi) was a town in Minamiakita District, Akita Prefecture, Japan.

In 2003, the town had an estimated population of 4,929 and a density of 311.96 inhabitants per square kilometre (808.0/sq mi). The total area was 15.80 km^{2} (6.10 sq mi).

On March 22, 2005, Iitagawa, Shōwa, and Tennō (all from Minamiakita District) merged to create the city of Katagami.

== Noted people from Iitagawa ==
- Yuki Kikuchi, basketball player
