= Akita at-large district =

Japan House of Councillors constituency

- 秋田県選挙区
- Parliamentary constituency for the House of Councillors
- Prefecture: Akita
- Electorate: 819,474 (as of September 2022)

Current constituency
- Created: 1947
- Seats: 2
- Councillors: Class of 2028: Hiroo Ishii (LDP); Class of 2031: Shizuka Terata (Independent)

The Akita at-large district (Japanese: 秋田県選挙区, Hepburn: Akita-ken Senkyoku) is a constituency that represents Akita Prefecture in the House of Councillors in the Diet of Japan. Councillors are elected to the house by single non-transferable vote (SNTV) for six-year terms. Since the establishment of the current House of Councillors electoral system in 1947, the district has elected two Councillors, one each at elections held every three years. It has 819,474 registered voters as of September 2022.

The Councillors currently representing Akita are:

- Hiroo Ishii (LDP); a former professional baseball in the Nippon Professional Baseball leagues, was elected to his first term in 2010 and re-elected in 2016 and 2022. His current term will end in 2028.
- Shizuka Terata (Independent); elected to her first term in 2019 and re-elected in 2025. Her current term will end in 2031.

== Elected Councillors ==
Class of 1947	Election year	Class of 1950
(1947: 6-year term)	Election year	(1947: 3-year term)
Yasutaka Suzuki (Liberal)	1947	Junkichi Ishikawa (Ind.)
Yasutaka Suzuki (Liberal)	1950	Kōki Haseyama (Liberal)
Hajime Suzuki (Ind.) (Note: Resigned 1 May 1958.)	1953	Kōki Haseyama (Liberal)
Hajime Suzuki (Ind.)	1956	Hitoshi Suzuki (Social Democratic)
Koichi Matsuno (LDP) (Note: Died in office 29 July 1967.)	1958 by-el. (Note: Held 22 June 1958.)	Hitoshi Suzuki (Social Democratic)
Koichi Matsuno (LDP)	1959	Hitoshi Suzuki (Social Democratic)
Koichi Matsuno (LDP)	1962	Hitoshi Suzuki (Social Democratic)
Koichi Matsuno (LDP)	1965	Hitoshi Suzuki (Social Democratic)
Masaji Sawada (Social Democratic)	1967 by-el. (Note: Held 15 September 1967.)	Hitoshi Suzuki (Social Democratic)
Masaji Sawada (Social Democratic)	1968	Goro Yamazaki (LDP) (Note: Died in office 6 April 1976.)
Masaji Sawada (Social Democratic)	1971	Goro Yamazaki (LDP)
Masaji Sawada (Social Democratic)	1974	Goro Yamazaki (LDP)
Masaji Sawada (Social Democratic)	1976 by-el. (Note: Held 23 May 1976.)	Man Sasaki (LDP)
Hosei Norota (LDP)	1977	Man Sasaki (LDP)
Hosei Norota (LDP)	1980	Man Sasaki (LDP)
Hiromitsu Deguchi (LDP)	1983	Man Sasaki (LDP)
Hiromitsu Deguchi (LDP)	1986	Man Sasaki (LDP)
Akio Hosoya (Social Democratic)	1989	Man Sasaki (LDP)
Akio Hosoya (Social Democratic)	1992	Man Sasaki (LDP)
Katsutoshi Kaneda (LDP)	1995	Man Sasaki (LDP)
Katsutoshi Kaneda (LDP)	1998	Shigenobu Saito (LDP)
Katsutoshi Kaneda (LDP)	2001	Shigenobu Saito (LDP)
Katsutoshi Kaneda (LDP)	2004	Yoetsu Suzuki (Ind.); Endorsed by DPJ, SDP
Daigo Matsuura (Ind.); Endorsed by DPJ, SDP, PNP	2007	Yoetsu Suzuki (Ind.); Endorsed by DPJ, SDP
Daigo Matsuura (Ind.); Endorsed by DPJ, SDP, PNP	2010	Hiroo Ishii (LDP)
Matsuji Nakaizumi (LDP)	2013	Hiroo Ishii (LDP)
Matsuji Nakaizumi (LDP)	2016	Hiroo Ishii (LDP)
Shizuka Terata (Ind.)	2019	Hiroo Ishii (LDP)
Shizuka Terata (Ind.)	2022	Hiroo Ishii (LDP)
Shizuka Terata (Ind.)	2025	Hiroo Ishii (LDP)

== Election results ==
2025: Akita at-large 1 seat
Party	Candidate	Votes	%	±%
Independent	Shizuka Terata	219,717	47.98	▼2.48
LDP	Matsuji Nakaizumi	171,324	37.41	▼5.25
Sanseitō	Miwako Satō	60,153	13.14	▲10.88
Anti-NHK	Yukihisa Honda	6,715	1.47	▲0.08
Turnout			58.57	▲3.01
Registered electors		792,910		
Party total seats		Won	Total	Change
Shizuka Terata (Ind.)		1	1	Steady
Liberal Democratic Party		0	1	Steady

2022
Party	Candidate	Votes	%	±%
LDP	Hiroo Ishii (Incumbent) (Endorsed by Komeito)	194,949	42.66%	▼11.28
Independent	Toshihide Muraoka (Endorsed by DPP)	162,889	35.65%	New
Independent	Yuriko Sasa (Endorsed by CDP)	62,415	13.66%	New
JCP	Yuri Fujimoto	19,983	4.37%	New
Sanseito	Mamiko Ito	10,329	2.26%	New
Anti-NHK	Yukihisa Honda	6,368	1.39%	New
Turnout		833,368	55.56%	▼0.73

2019
Party	Candidate	Votes	%	±%
Independent	Shizuka Terata	242,286	50.5%	−
LDP	Matsuji Nakaizumi	221,219	46.1%	−6.2
Anti-NHK	Ryuuji Ishioka	16,683	3.5%	−
Turnout		864,560	56.29%	−4.58

2016
Party	Candidate	Votes	%	±%
LDP	Hiroo Ishii	290,052	53.9%	−1.7
Democratic	Daigo Matsuura	236,521	44.0%	+5.0
Happiness Realization	Akira Nishino	11,131	2.1%	+0.7
Turnout		897,614	60.87%	

2013
Party	Candidate	Votes	%	±%
LDP	Matsuji Nakaizumi (endorsed by Komeito)	260,846	52.3	
Democratic	Daigo Matsuura	194,497	39.0	
JCP	Yoshio Satake	36,371	7.3	
Happiness Realization	Akira Nishino	6,736	1.4	
Turnout				

2010
Party	Candidate	Votes	%	±%
LDP	Hiroo Ishii (Endorsed by Sunrise Party)	328,771	55.6	
Democratic	Yoetsu Suzuki (Endorsed by People's New Party)	226,217	38.3	
JCP	Kazuhisa Fujita	36,320	6.1	
Turnout				

2007
Party	Candidate	Votes	%	±%
Independent	Daigo Matsuura (Endorsed by DPJ, SDP)	319,631	50.4	
LDP	Katsutoshi Kaneda (Endorsed by Komeito)	276,694	43.6	
JCP	Satoshi Suzuki	38,394	6.0	
Turnout				
