= Manabu Terata =

Japanese politician

- 寺田 学
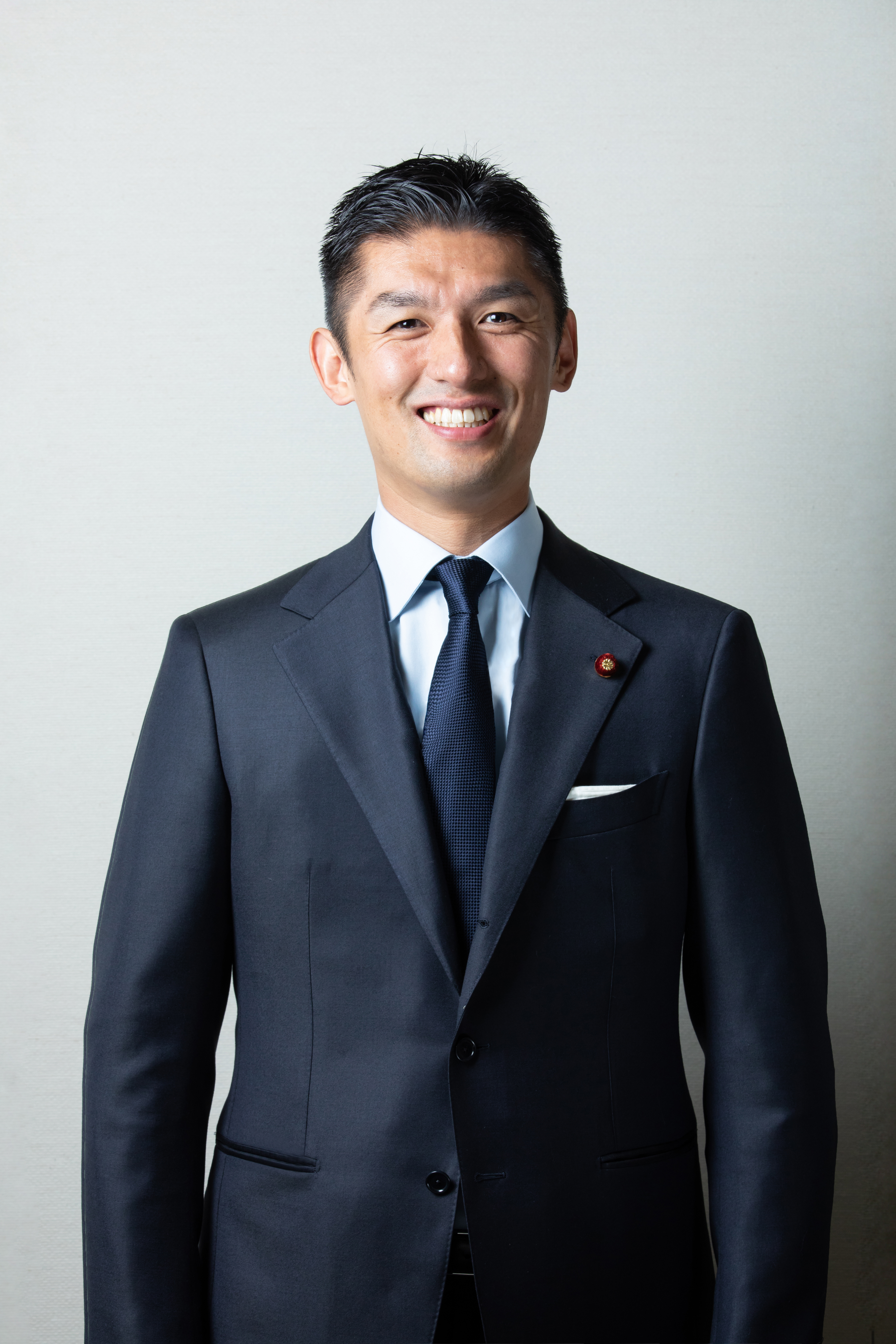
- Official portrait, 2019

Special Advisor to the Prime Minister of Japan
- In office 10 February 2012 – 26 December 2012
- Prime Minister: Yoshihiko Noda
- In office 8 June 2010 – 26 March 2011
- Prime Minister: Naoto Kan

Member of the House of Representatives
- In office 19 December 2014 – 23 January 2026
- Constituency: Tohoku PR
- In office 10 November 2003 – 16 November 2012
- Preceded by: Koji Futada
- Succeeded by: Hiroyuki Togashi
- Constituency: Akita 1st

Personal details
- Born: 20 September 1976 (age 50) Yokote, Akita, Japan
- Party: CDP (since 2020)
- Other political affiliations: DPJ (before 2013; 2014–2016); Independent (2013–2014; 2018–2020); DP (2016–2017); KnT (2017–2018)
- Spouse: Shizuka Terata (m. 2009)
- Parent: Sukeshiro Terata (father)
- Education: Chuo University
- Website: Terata Manabu Official Website

Manabu Terata (寺田 学, Terata Manabu; born 27 October 1976) is a Japanese politician serving in the House of Representatives in the Diet as a member of the Constitutional Democratic Party.

== Early life ==
Terata is a native of Yokote, Akita and graduated from Chuo University.

== Political career ==
Terata was elected to the House of Representatives for the first time in 2003.

He served as a Special Advisor to the Prime Minister of Japan from February to December 2012.

== Family ==
He is the son of former governor of Akita Prefecture Sukeshiro Terata. His wife is Shizuka Terata member of the House of Councillors.
