= Hiroyuki Togashi =

Japanese politician

- 冨樫 博之
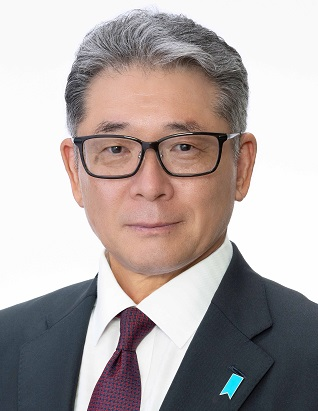
- Official portrait, 2023

Member of the House of Representatives
- Incumbent
- Assumed office 16 December 2012
- Preceded by: Manabu Terata
- Constituency: Akita 1st

Speaker of the Akita Prefectural Assembly
- In office 6 August 2009 – 29 April 2011

Member of the Akita Prefectural Assembly
- In office 1995–2012
- Constituency: Akita City

Personal details
- Born: 27 April 1955 (age 71) Akita, Japan
- Party: Liberal Democratic
- Education: North Asia University

Hiroyuki Togashi (冨樫 博之, Togashi Hiroyuki; born 27 April 1955) is a Japanese politician from the Liberal Democratic Party who served as the State Minister for Reconstruction in 2021.
