= Wakakoma Kenzo =

Japanese sumo wrestler (1937–2019)

Wakakoma Kenzō
Personal information
- Native name: 若駒 健三
- Born: Kenzō Itō; 20 April 1937 Gojōme, Akita, Japan
- Died: 31 August 2019 (aged 82)
- Height: 1.70 m (5 ft 7 in)
- Weight: 83 kg (183 lb; 13.1 st)

Sport
- Sport: Sumo
- Retired: March, 1962
- Heya: Nishonoseki → Shibatayama → Hanakago
- Record: 219-153-48
- Debut: May, 1952
- Highest rank: Maegashira 8 (November, 1961)
- Championships: 1 (Jūryō); 1 (Makushita)
- Updated on Sep. 2012

Wakakoma Kenzō (若駒 健三; born Kenzō Itō [伊藤 健三]; 20 April 1937 – 31 August 2019) was a Japanese sumo wrestler from Gojōme, Akita. He made his professional debut in May 1952 and reached the top division in September 1961. His highest rank was maegashira 8. He left the sumo world upon retirement from active competition in March 1962. He died at the age of 82.

== Fighting Style ==
He was a yotsu-sumo wrestler, and his most common winning techniques were shitatehineri (twisting underarm throw), oshidashi (push out) and shitatenage (underarm throw). He preferred a migi-yotsu (left hand outside, left right inside) grip on his opponent's mawashi.

== Pre-modern career record ==
Kenzo joined Nishonoseki stable in May 1952 and was given the shikona "Ohibiki" (大響). He transferred to Shibatayama stable (later renamed Hanakago stable) in September 1952. He was promoted to sandanme in May 1954 and makushita in May 1955. In March 1960 he changed his shikona to "Wakakoma" (若駒). Three tournaments later in July 1960, he won the makushita yusho with a perfect 7–0 record at the rank of makushita 13 and was promoted to juryo for the following September 1960 tournament.

- In 1953 the New Year tournament was begun and the Spring tournament began to be held in Osaka.

Wakakoma Kenzo
-	Spring Haru basho, Tokyo	Summer Natsu basho, Tokyo	Autumn Aki basho, Tokyo
1952	x	Shinjo; 2–1	East Jonidan #27; 0–0–8
Record given as wins–losses–absences Top division champion Top division runner-up Retired Lower divisions Non-participation Sanshō key: F=Fighting spirit; O=Outstanding performance; T=Technique Also shown: ★=Kinboshi; P=Playoff(s); Divisions: Makuuchi — Jūryō — Makushita — Sandanme — Jonidan — Jonokuchi Makuuchi ranks: Yokozuna — Ōzeki — Sekiwake — Komusubi — Maegashira

-	New Year Hatsu basho, Tokyo	Spring Haru basho, Osaka	Summer Natsu basho, Tokyo	Autumn Aki basho, Tokyo
1953	East Jonokuchi #1; 0–0–8	(Banzukegai)	(Banzukegai)	Shinjo; 2–1
1954	East Jonidan #57; 6–2	East Jonidan #16; 7–1	East Sandanme #60; 5–3	East Sandanme #43; 4–4
1955	East Sandanme #37; 5–3	East Sandanme #14; 6–2	West Makushita #52; 5–3	West Makushita #44; 6–2
1956	West Makushita #30; 7–1	West Makushita #14; 4–4	East Makushita #13; 4–4	East Makushita #13; 4–4
Record given as wins–losses–absences Top division champion Top division runner-up Retired Lower divisions Non-participation Sanshō key: F=Fighting spirit; O=Outstanding performance; T=Technique Also shown: ★=Kinboshi; P=Playoff(s); Divisions: Makuuchi — Jūryō — Makushita — Sandanme — Jonidan — Jonokuchi Makuuchi ranks: Yokozuna — Ōzeki — Sekiwake — Komusubi — Maegashira

== Juryo career ==
In his first tournament as a sekitori, Wakakoma finished with an 8–7 record. In the following November 1960 tournament, he won the juryo yusho with a strong 12–3 record. After two successive 10-5 records, he was promoted to makuuchi in September 1961.

== Makuuchi career ==
He produced a solid 9–6 record in his top division debut, but followed with two consecutive losing records and was demoted back down to juryo after three tournaments in makuuchi. After falling down to juryo he abruptly announced his retirement after the March 1962 tournament.

== Championships ==
1 Juryo Championship (November 1960)

1 Makushita Championship (July 1960)

- Since the addition of the Kyushu tournament in 1957 and the Nagoya tournament in 1958, the yearly schedule has remained unchanged.

Year	January Hatsu basho, Tokyo	March Haru basho, Osaka	May Natsu basho, Tokyo	July Nagoya basho, Nagoya	September Aki basho, Tokyo	November Kyūshū basho, Fukuoka
1957	West Makushita #12; 4–4	West Makushita #10; 4–4	West Makushita #9; 5–3	Not held	West Makushita #6; 4–4	East Makushita #6; 4–4
1958	East Makushita #7; 4–4	East Makushita #6; 6–2	East Makushita #1; 0–2–6	West Makushita #13; 4–1–3	East Makushita #11; 0–0–8	West Makushita #26; 0–0–8
1959	East Makushita #46; 5–3	West Makushita #39; 4–4	East Makushita #39; 6–2	East Makushita #21; 1–7	West Makushita #37; 0–1–7	West Makushita #62; 7–1
1960	East Makushita #40; 4–4	East Makushita #35; 5–3	East Makushita #26; 6–2	East Makushita #13; 7–0; Champion	West Jūryō #15; 8–7	West Jūryō #14; 12–3; Champion
1961	West Jūryō #4; 10–5	East Jūryō #1; 4–11	East Jūryō #8; 10–5	East Jūryō #2; 10–5	East Maegashira #13; 9–6	West Maegashira #8; 6–9
1962	East Maegashira #12; 3–12	East Jūryō #4; Retired –	x	x	x	x
Record given as wins–losses–absences Top division champion Top division runner-up Retired Lower divisions Non-participation Sanshō key: F=Fighting spirit; O=Outstanding performance; T=Technique Also shown: ★=Kinboshi; P=Playoff(s); Divisions: Makuuchi — Jūryō — Makushita — Sandanme — Jonidan — Jonokuchi Makuuchi ranks: Yokozuna — Ōzeki — Sekiwake — Komusubi — Maegashira

== See also ==
- Glossary of sumo terms
- List of past sumo wrestlers
- List of sumo tournament second division champions
