= Kōsei Yoshida =

Japanese baseball player (born 2001)

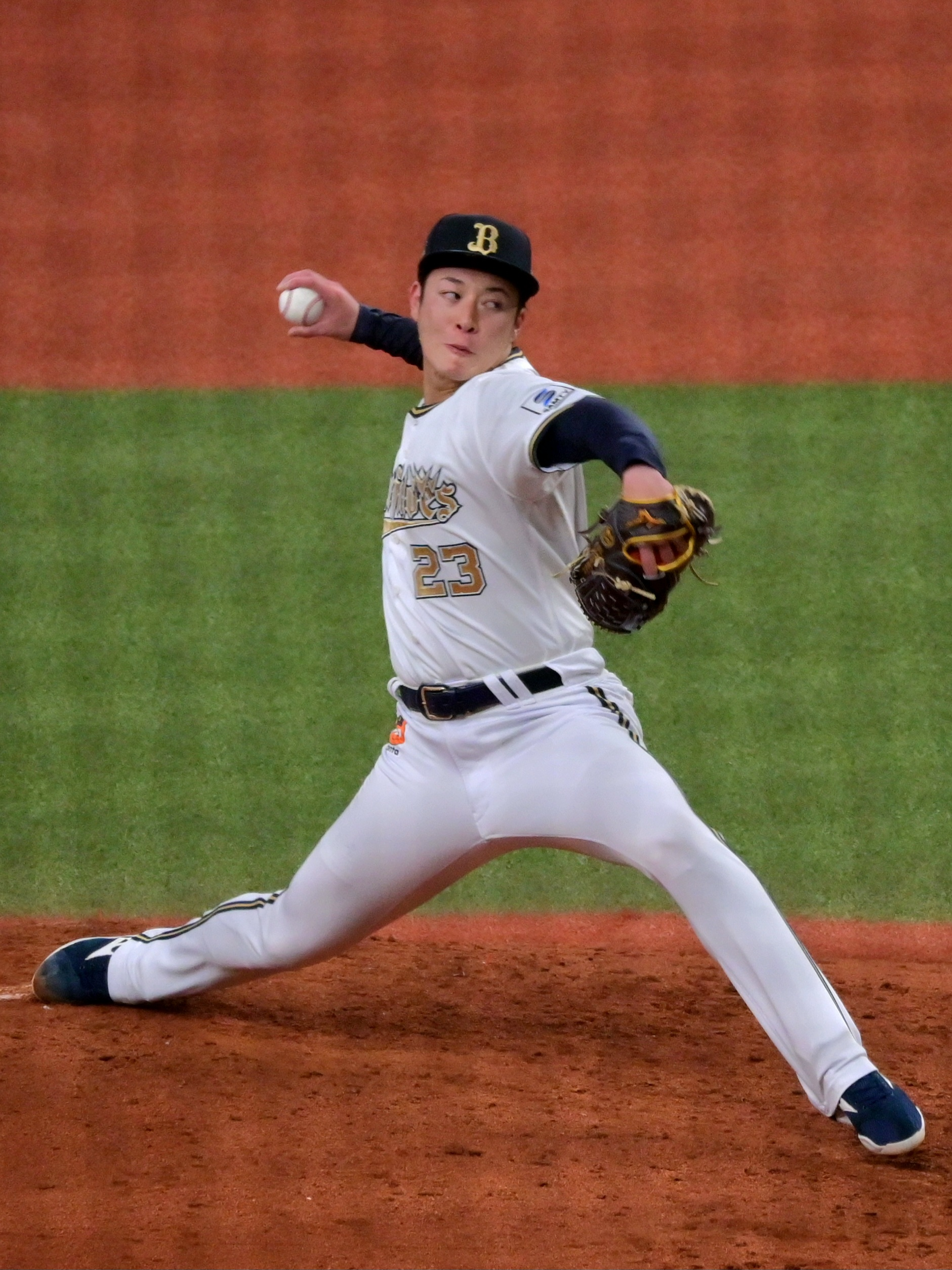

Orix Buffaloes – No. 23
- Pitcher
- Born: January 12, 2001 (age 24); Tenno, Akita, Japan
- Bats: Right Throws: Right

NPB debut
- July 12, 2019, for the Hokkaido Nippon-Ham Fighters

Career statistics (through 2024 season)
- Win–loss record: 7-9
- Earned Run Average: 5.39
- Strikeouts: 98
- Saves: 0
- Holds: 19

Teams
- Hokkaido Nippon-Ham Fighters (2019–2023); Orix Buffaloes (2024–present)

Kōsei Yoshida (吉田 輝星, Yoshida Kōsei; born January 12, 2001) is a professional Japanese baseball player. He plays pitcher for the Orix Buffaloes.
