= Matsuji Nakaizumi =

Japanese politician

- 中泉 松司
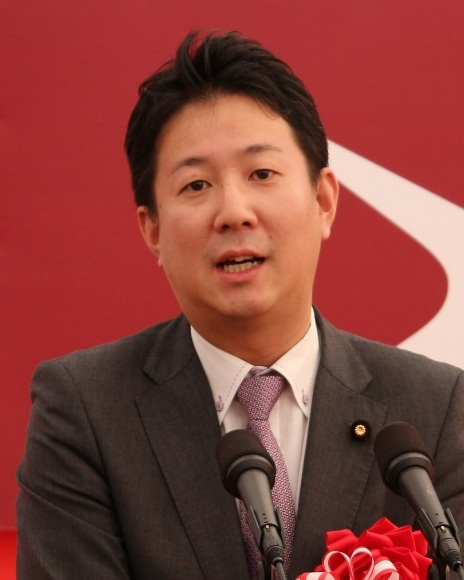
- Nakaizumi in 2016

Member of the House of Councillors
- In office 29 July 2013 – 28 July 2019
- Preceded by: Daigo Matsuura
- Succeeded by: Shizuka Terata
- Constituency: Akita at-large

Member of the Akita Prefectural Assembly
- In office 30 April 2007 – 2013
- Constituency: Akita City

Personal details
- Born: 7 May 1979 (age 47) Akita City, Akita, Japan
- Party: Liberal Democratic
- Education: Chuo University

Matsuji Nakaizumi (中泉松司, Nakaizumi Matsuji; born 7 May 1979) is a Japanese politician from the Liberal Democratic Party. As of 2014 he served as member of the House of Councillors for Akita At-large district.
