= Man Sasaki =

Japanese politician (1926–2022)

- 佐々木 満

Director-General of the Management and Coordination Agency
- In office 29 December 1990 – 5 November 1991
- Prime Minister: Toshiki Kaifu
- Preceded by: Jun Shiozaki
- Succeeded by: Junzō Iwasaki

Member of the House of Councillors
- In office 24 May 1976 – 25 July 1998
- Preceded by: Gorō Yamazaki
- Succeeded by: Shigenobu Saitō
- Constituency: Akita at-large

Personal details
- Born: 20 April 1926 Ogachi, Akita, Japan
- Died: 7 April 2022 (aged 95) Akita City, Akita, Japan
- Party: Liberal Democratic
- Education: University of Tokyo

Man Sasaki (Japanese: 佐々木満 Sasaki Man; 20 April 1926 – 7 April 2022) was a Japanese politician. A member of the Liberal Democratic Party, he served in the House of Councillors from 1976 to 1998. He died in Akita on 7 April 2022 at the age of 95.
