= Kazuo Nakamura (basketball) =

Japanese basketball coach

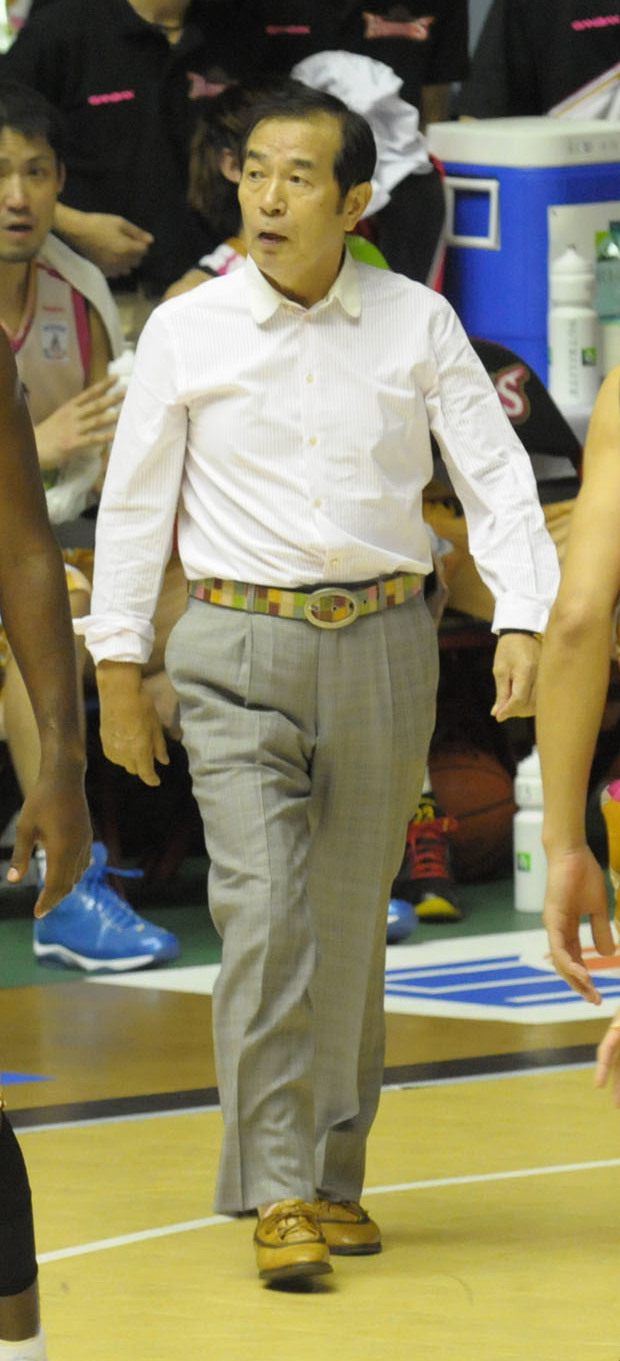
- Nakamura at Akita Prefectural Gymnasium (2011)

Personal information
- Born: December 4, 1940 (age 85) Oga, Akita

Career information
- High school: Akita (Akita, Akita)
- College: Shibaura Institute of Technology
- Coaching career: 1966–present

Career history

Playing
- 1962: Tekkosha
- 1963–1965: Akita Isuzu Motors

Coaching
- 1966–1974: Kakumei Joshi HS
- 1974-1992: Kyodo Oil Sunflowers
- 1995-1998: Akita Keizai University
- 1998-2011: OSG/Hamamatsu Higashimikawa Phoenix
- 2011-2014: Akita Northern Happinets
- 2015-2016: Niigata Albirex BB
- 1978-1981 1985-1990: Japan National Women

Career highlights
- 3x Japanese High School Champions (girls); 6x Women's Japan Basketball League Champions; 5x Japanese Women's Champions; 2x bj league Champions
Medals
Basketball coaching
Representing Japan
FIBA Women's Asia Cup
| Bronze medal – third place | 1980 Hong Kong | Japan |
Asian Games
| Bronze medal – third place | 1986 Seoul | Japan |

Kazuo Nakamura (中村 和雄, Nakamura Kazuo; born December 4, 1940) is a former professional basketball head coach for Hamamatsu, Akita and Niigata and a former college basketball head coach for Akita Keizaihoka University in Japan. Nakamura always said to players, "Play basketball with all your heart." He admires Mike Krzyzewski and Bob Knight. Nakamura also served for the San Antonio Silver Stars as a scout in Asia. He currently teaches amateurs in Akita prefecture.

== Head coaching record ==
Legend
| Regular season | G | Games coached | W | Games won | L | Games lost | W–L % | Win–loss % |
| Playoffs | PG | Playoff games | PW | Playoff wins | PL | Playoff losses | PW–L % | Playoff win–loss % |

| Team | Year | G | W | L | W–L% | Finish | PG | PW | PL | PW–L% | Result |
|---|---|---|---|---|---|---|---|---|---|---|---|
| Hamamatsu Higashimikawa Phoenix | 2008-09 | 52 | 36 | 16 | .692 | 1st in Eastern | 4 | 2 | 2 | .500 | Lost in Second Round |
| Hamamatsu Higashimikawa Phoenix | 2009-10 | 52 | 41 | 11 | .788 | 1st in Eastern | 4 | 4 | 0 | 1.000 | Bj Champions |
| Hamamatsu Higashimikawa Phoenix | 2010-11 | 46 | 40 | 6 | .870 | 1st in Eastern | 4 | 4 | 0 | 1.000 | Bj Champions |
| Akita Northern Happinets | 2011-12 | 52 | 28 | 24 | .538 | 3rd in Eastern | 6 | 3 | 3 | .500 | Lost in Second Round |
| Akita Northern Happinets | 2012-13 | 52 | 26 | 26 | .500 | 5th in Eastern | 5 | 2 | 3 | .400 | Lost in Second Round |
| Akita Northern Happinets | 2013-14 | 52 | 40 | 12 | .769 | 3rd in Eastern | 6 | 5 | 1 | .833 | Eastern Champions |
| Niigata Albirex BB | 2015-16 | 52 | 34 | 18 | .654 | 4th in Eastern | 2 | 0 | 2 | .000 | Lost in First Round |
| Akita totals | | 156 | 94 | 62 | .603 | | 17 | 10 | 7 | .588 | |
| Bj league totals | | 358 | 245 | 113 | .684 | | 31 | 20 | 11 | .645 | |
