= Yoetsu Suzuki =

Japanese politician

- 鈴木 陽悦

Member of the House of Councillors
- In office 26 July 2004 – 25 July 2010
- Preceded by: Shigenobu Saitō
- Succeeded by: Hiroo Ishii
- Constituency: Akita at-large

Personal details
- Born: 10 January 1949 (age 77) Akita City, Akita, Japan
- Party: Independent
- Other political affiliations: Democratic (2009–2010)
- Education: Chuo University

Yoetsu Suzuki (鈴木 陽悦, Suzuki Yōetsu; born January 10, 1949) is a former Japanese politician who served as a member of the House of Councillors in the Diet (national legislature). A native of Akita, Akita and graduate of Chuo University, he was elected to the House of Councillors since 2004 after working at Akita Television.
