= Daigo Matsuura =

Japanese politician

- 松浦 大悟

Member of the House of Councillors
- In office 29 July 2007 – 28 July 2013
- Preceded by: Katsutoshi Kaneda
- Succeeded by: Matsuji Nakaizumi
- Constituency: Akita at-large

Personal details
- Born: 3 October 1969 (age 57) Hiroshima, Japan
- Party: Innovation (since 2022)
- Other political affiliations: DPJ (2007–2016); DP (2016–2017); Kibō no Tō (2017–2022)
- Education: Kobe Gakuin University

Daigo Matsuura (松浦 大悟, Matsuura Daigo; born October 3, 1969) is a Japanese politician, an independent and former member of the House of Councillors in the Diet (national legislature). A native of Hiroshima Prefecture and graduate of Kobe Gakuin University, he served in the House of Councillors between 2007 and 2013. He worked as a newsreader from 1992 to 2006.

In October 2017, he came out as gay.
