= Katsutoshi Kaneda =

Japanese politician

- 金田 勝年
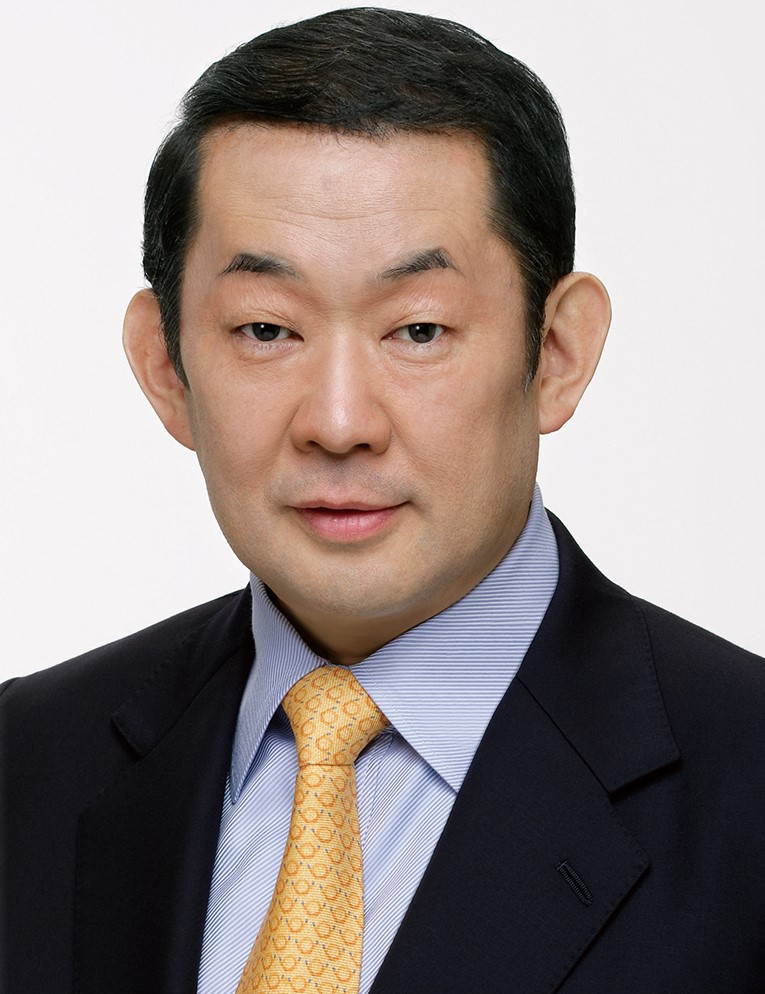
- Official portrait, 2008

Minister of Justice
- In office 3 August 2016 – 3 August 2017
- Prime Minister: Shinzo Abe
- Preceded by: Mitsuhide Iwaki
- Succeeded by: Yōko Kamikawa

Member of the House of Representatives
- In office 30 August 2009 – 9 October 2024
- Constituency: Tohoku PR (2009–2012); Akita 2nd (2012–2021); Tohoku PR (2021–2024)

Member of the House of Councillors
- In office 23 July 1995 – 28 July 2007
- Preceded by: Akio Hosoya
- Succeeded by: Daigo Matsuura
- Constituency: Akita at-large

Personal details
- Born: 4 October 1949 (age 76) Shōwa, Akita, Japan
- Party: Liberal Democratic
- Education: Hitotsubashi University
- Website: Official website

Katsutoshi Kaneda (金田 勝年, Kaneda Katsutoshi) is a Japanese politician who served as the Minister of Justice from 2016 to 2017. He studied at and graduated from Hitotsubashi University.

Political offices
Preceded by Mitsuhide Iwaki	Minister of Justice; 2016–2017	Succeeded by Yōko Kamikawa
