= Gojōme =

Gojōme 五城目町
- Town
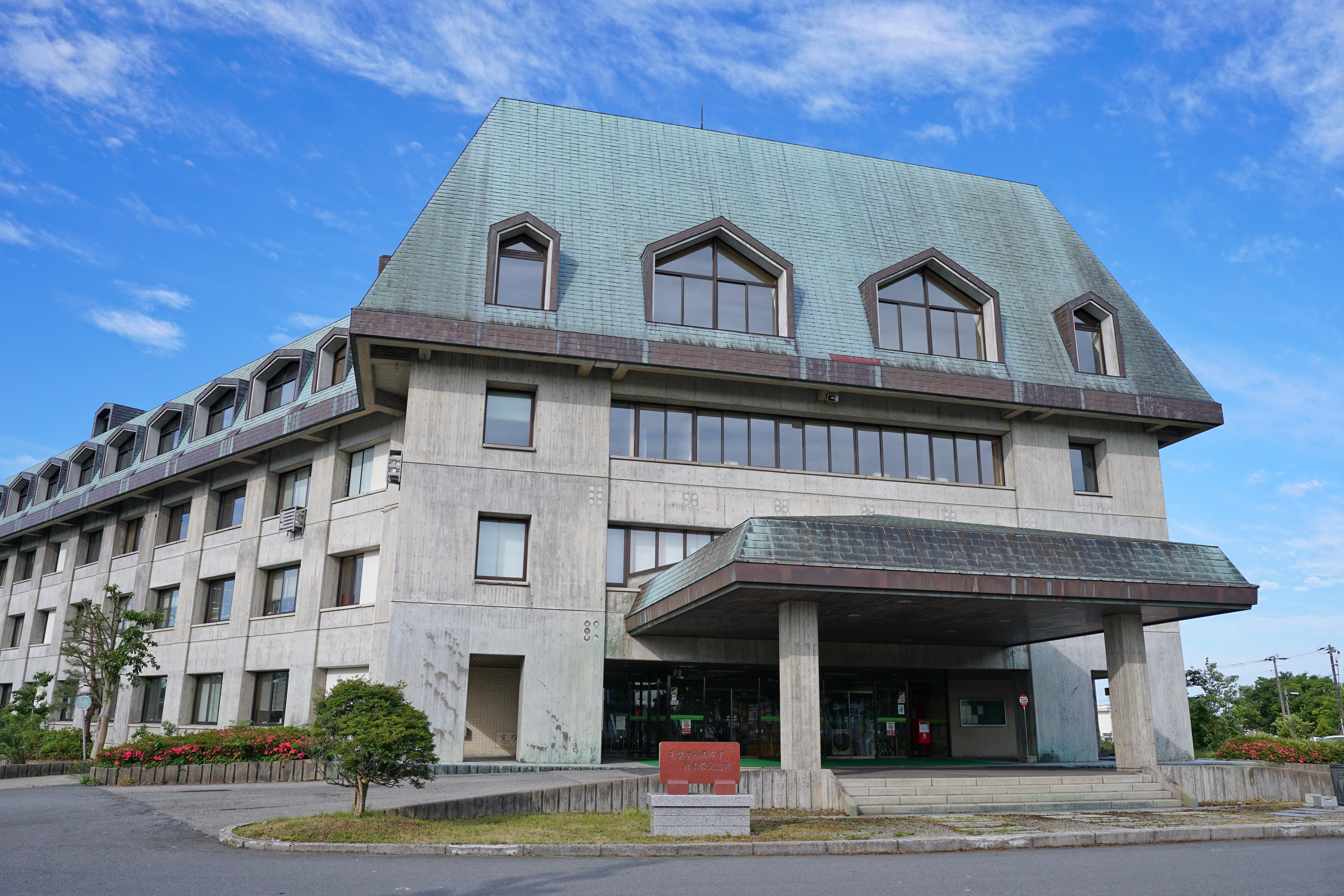
- Gojōme Town Hall

- Flag Seal
- Interactive map of Gojōme
- Coordinates: 39°56′38″N 140°6′41.9″E
- Country: Japan
- Region: Tōhoku
- Prefecture: Akita
- District: Minamiakita

Area
  - Total: 214.92 km^{2} (82.98 sq mi)

Population (February 28, 2023)
  - Total: 8,317
  - Density: 38.70/km^{2} (100.2/sq mi)
- Time zone: UTC+9 (Japan Standard Time)
- Phone number: 018-852-5100
- Address: 1-1-1 Nishi-isonome, Gojōme-machi, Minami-akita-gun, Akita-ken 018-1725
- Climate: Cfa/Dfa
- Website: Official website
- Symbols
- Bird: Japanese bush-warbler
- Flower: Lilium auratum
- Tree: Cryptomeria

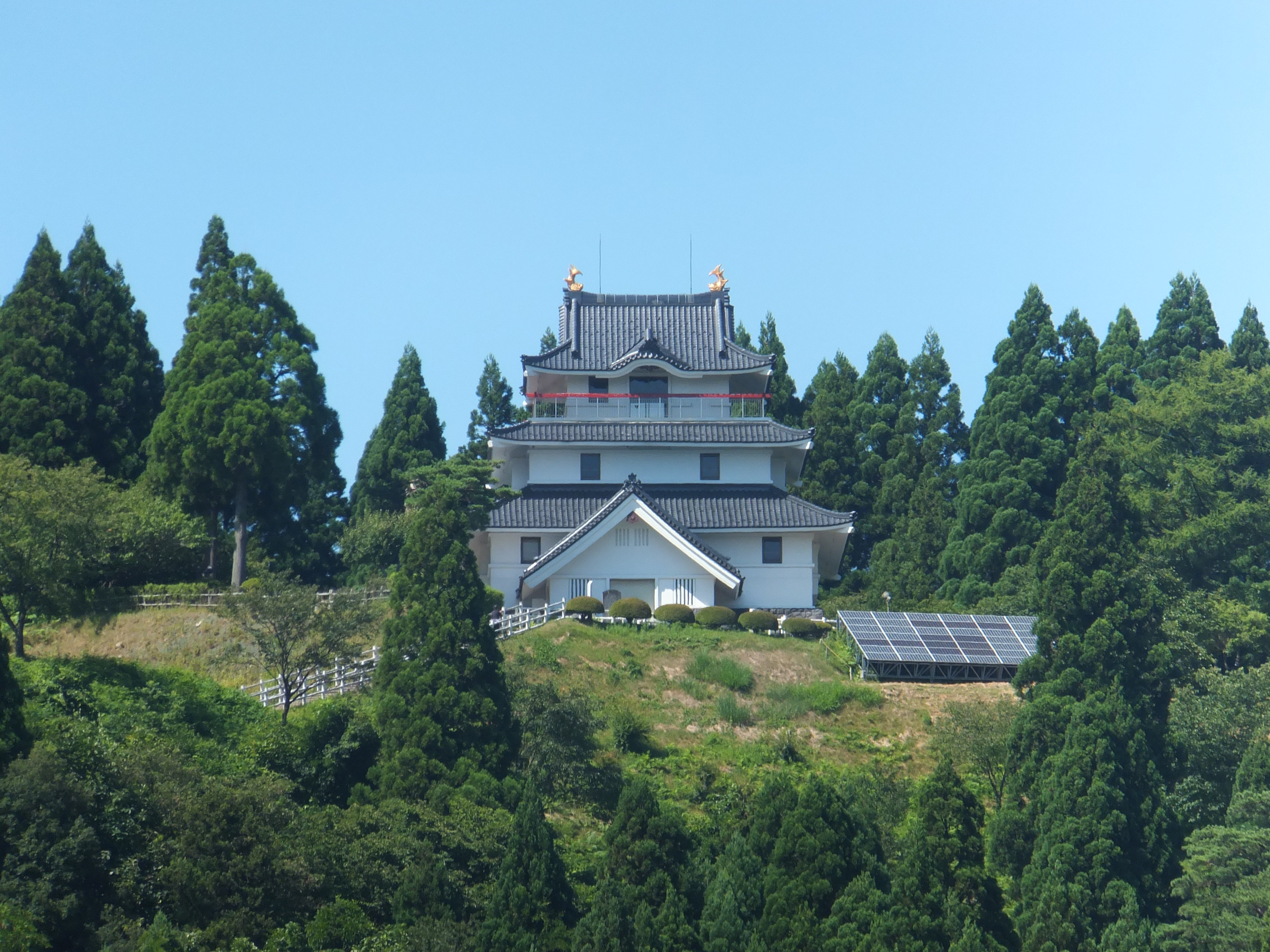
Gojōme Forestry Museum

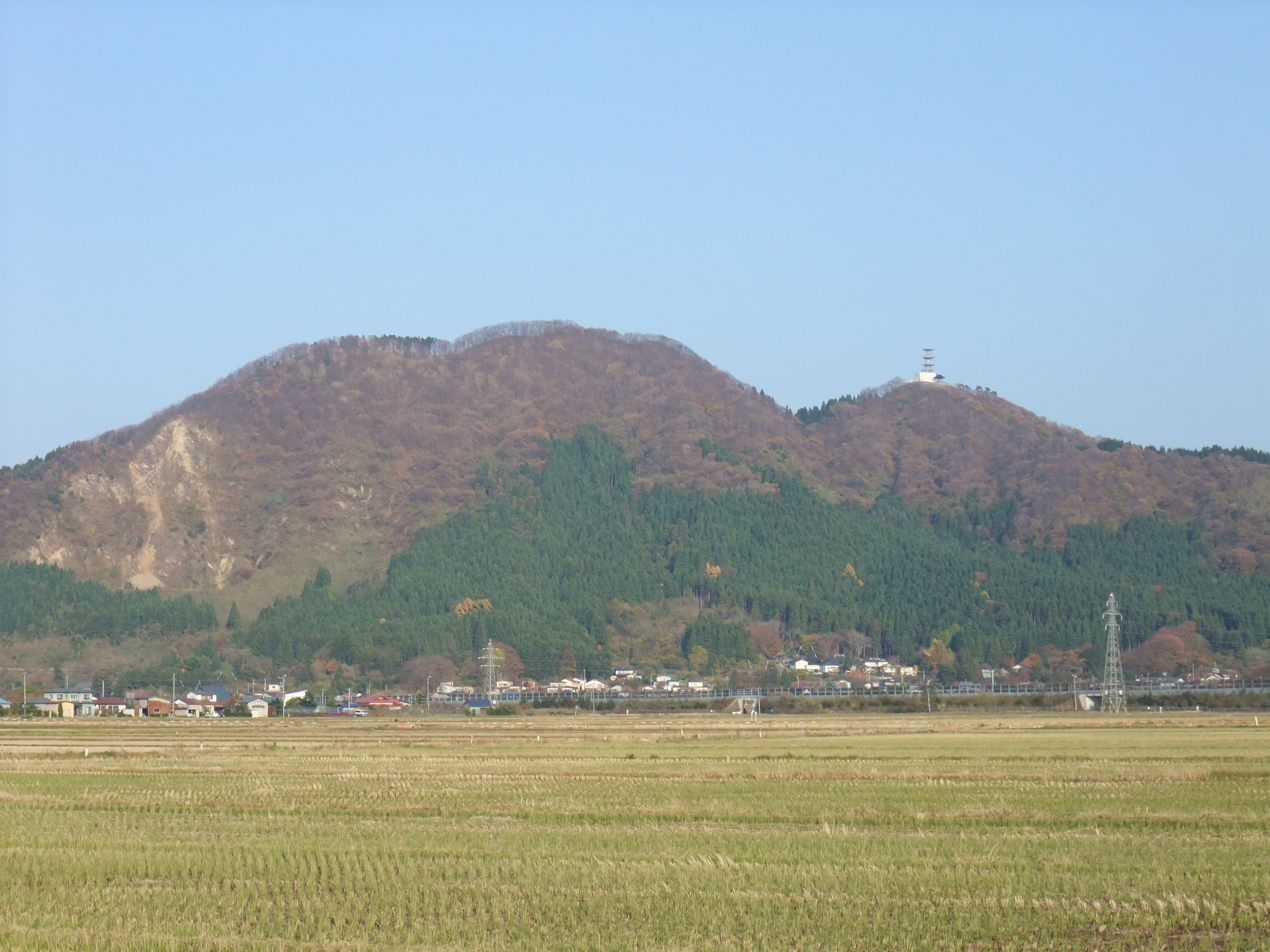
森山

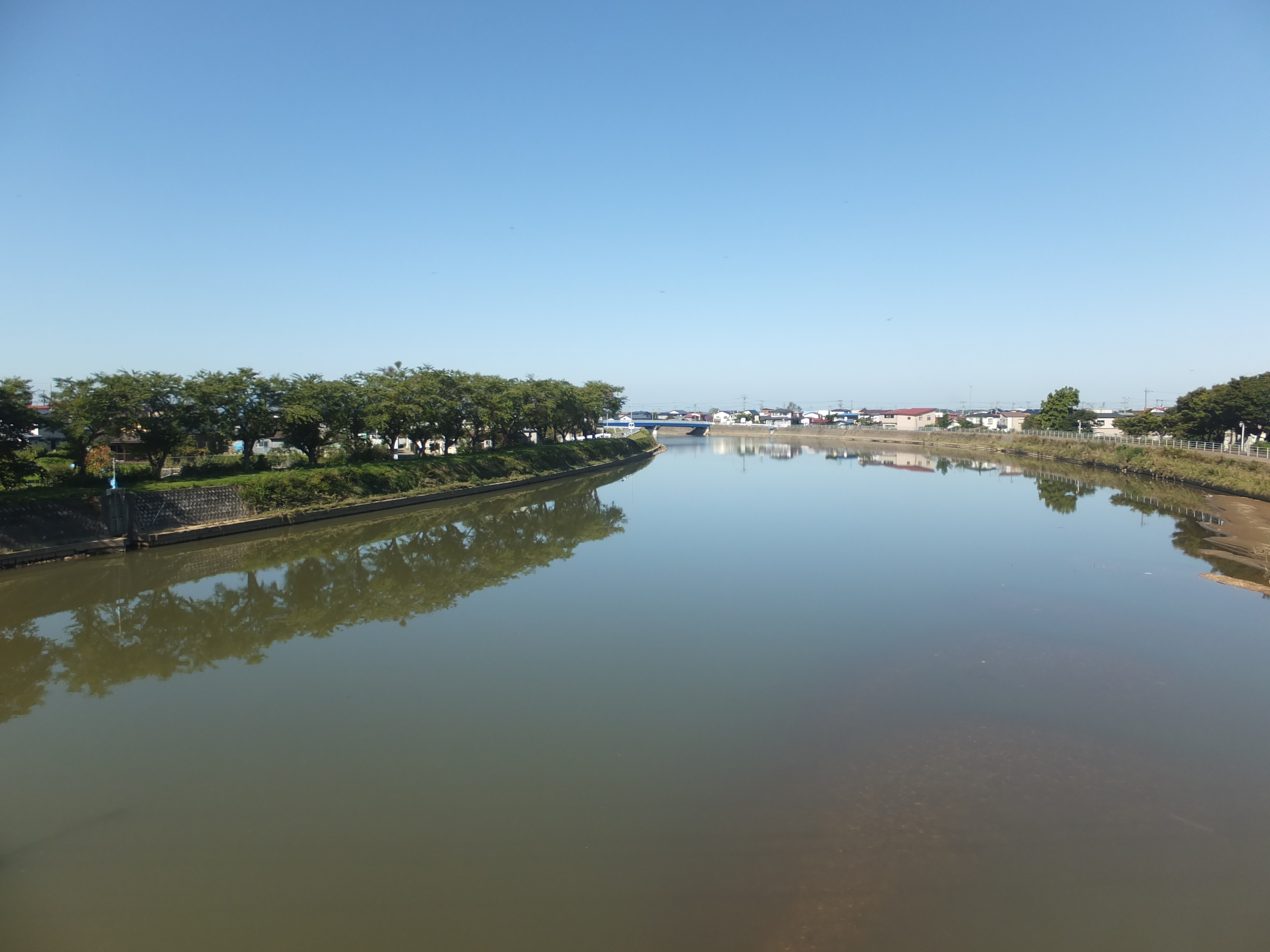
Babame River

Gojōme (五城目町, Gojōme-machi) is a town located in Akita, Japan. As of 28 February 2023, the town had an estimated population of 8317 in 3870 households and a population density of 39 persons per km^{2}. The total area was 214.92 square kilometres (82.98 sq mi).

== Geography ==
Gojōme is located in coastal plains of northwestern Akita Prefecture, with mountainous areas in the east and urban areas and rural areas in the west. It is approximately 30 km north of the city of Akita.

=== Neighboring municipalities ===
Akita Prefecture

- Akita
- Hachirōgata
- Ikawa
- Kamikoani
- Mitane
- Ōgata

=== Climate ===
Gojōme has a humid continental climate (Köppen climate classification Dfa) with large seasonal temperature differences, with warm to hot (and often humid) summers and cold (sometimes severely cold) winters. Precipitation is significant throughout the year, but is heaviest from August to October. The average annual temperature in Gojōme is 11.2 °C (52.2 °F). The average annual rainfall is 1,665.0 mm (65.55 in) with September as the wettest month. The temperatures are highest on average in August, at around 24.1 °C (75.4 °F), and lowest in January, at around −0.5 °C (31.1 °F).

Climate data for Gojōme (1991−2020 normals, extremes 1976−present)
Month	Jan	Feb	Mar	Apr	May	Jun	Jul	Aug	Sep	Oct	Nov	Dec	Year
Record high °C (°F)	12.9 (55.2)	19.3 (66.7)	20.0 (68.0)	28.3 (82.9)	31.7 (89.1)	33.3 (91.9)	36.6 (97.9)	38.1 (100.6)	38.1 (100.6)	30.1 (86.2)	24.6 (76.3)	18.6 (65.5)	38.1 (100.6)
Mean daily maximum °C (°F)	2.6 (36.7)	3.5 (38.3)	7.7 (45.9)	14.2 (57.6)	19.8 (67.6)	24.1 (75.4)	27.3 (81.1)	29.1 (84.4)	25.4 (77.7)	19.0 (66.2)	12.1 (53.8)	5.5 (41.9)	15.9 (60.6)
Daily mean °C (°F)	−0.5 (31.1)	−0.1 (31.8)	3.1 (37.6)	8.7 (47.7)	14.5 (58.1)	19.0 (66.2)	22.8 (73.0)	24.1 (75.4)	19.9 (67.8)	13.3 (55.9)	7.2 (45.0)	1.8 (35.2)	11.2 (52.1)
Mean daily minimum °C (°F)	−3.5 (25.7)	−3.6 (25.5)	−1.2 (29.8)	3.2 (37.8)	9.4 (48.9)	14.5 (58.1)	19.2 (66.6)	20.0 (68.0)	15.4 (59.7)	8.6 (47.5)	3.0 (37.4)	−1.3 (29.7)	7.0 (44.6)
Record low °C (°F)	−14.4 (6.1)	−14.2 (6.4)	−12.1 (10.2)	−5.8 (21.6)	−0.7 (30.7)	5.5 (41.9)	11.1 (52.0)	11.3 (52.3)	5.4 (41.7)	0.5 (32.9)	−6.1 (21.0)	−10.5 (13.1)	−14.4 (6.1)
Average precipitation mm (inches)	131.5 (5.18)	101.2 (3.98)	92.7 (3.65)	94.0 (3.70)	109.4 (4.31)	107.4 (4.23)	191.8 (7.55)	174.4 (6.87)	163.5 (6.44)	164.0 (6.46)	176.1 (6.93)	159.1 (6.26)	1,665 (65.55)
Average snowfall cm (inches)	156 (61)	126 (50)	44 (17)	1 (0.4)	0 (0)	0 (0)	0 (0)	0 (0)	0 (0)	0 (0)	7 (2.8)	79 (31)	410 (161)
Average precipitation days (≥ 1.0 mm)	21.8	18.6	15.6	12.0	11.5	10.8	12.6	10.7	12.5	14.7	18.7	22.3	181.8
Average snowy days (≥ 3 cm)	18.2	15.9	6.0	0.2	0	0	0	0	0	0	0.6	9.1	50
Mean monthly sunshine hours	36.8	59.3	105.0	155.0	176.4	173.6	146.8	174.5	145.4	127.7	80.4	43.7	1,424.6
Source: Japan Meteorological Agency

== Demographics ==
Per Japanese census data, the population of Gojōme peaked at around the year 1960 and has been in steady decline since then.

Historical population
Year	Pop.	±% p.a.
1920	15,026	—
1930	15,813	+0.51%
1940	16,177	+0.23%
1950	19,536	+1.90%
1960	20,025	+0.25%
1970	17,413	−1.39%
1980	15,953	−0.87%
1990	14,161	−1.18%
2000	12,372	−1.34%
2010	10,517	−1.61%
2020	8,538	−2.06%

== History ==
The area of present-day Gojōme was part of ancient Dewa Province, dominated by the Satake clan during the Edo period, who ruled Kubota Domain under the Tokugawa shogunate. The village of Gojōme was created on April 1, 1889, within Minamiakita District, Akita with the establishment of the modern municipalities system. It was elevated to town status on January 18, 1896.

== Government ==
Gojōme has a mayor-council form of government with a directly elected mayor and a unicameral town council of 14 members. Gojōme, together with the city of Noshiro and the other municipalities of Yamamoto District contributes four members to the Akita Prefectural Assembly. In terms of national politics, the town is part of Akita 2nd district of the lower house of the Diet of Japan.

== Economy ==
The economy of Gojōme is based primarily on agriculture. The town is known for the Morning Market on weekends, which claims a history of over 500 years.

== Education ==
Gojōme has one public elementary school and one public middle school operated by the town government. The town has one public high school operated by the Akita Prefectural Board of Education.

== Transportation ==
=== Railway ===
The Ōu Main Line passes through the Okawa neighborhood of the town, but there is no station. In the past, the Akita Chuo Kotsu Line linked Gojōme to Hachirōgata Station in Hachirōgata, but the line was abolished in 1969.

=== Highway ===
- Akita Expressway
- National Route 7
- National Route 285

== Noted people from Gojōme ==
- Wakakoma Kenzo, sumo wrestler
- Masashi Kudo, professional boxer
- Yasaburo Sugawara, wrestler
