= Kenzo Futaki =

Kenzō Futaki
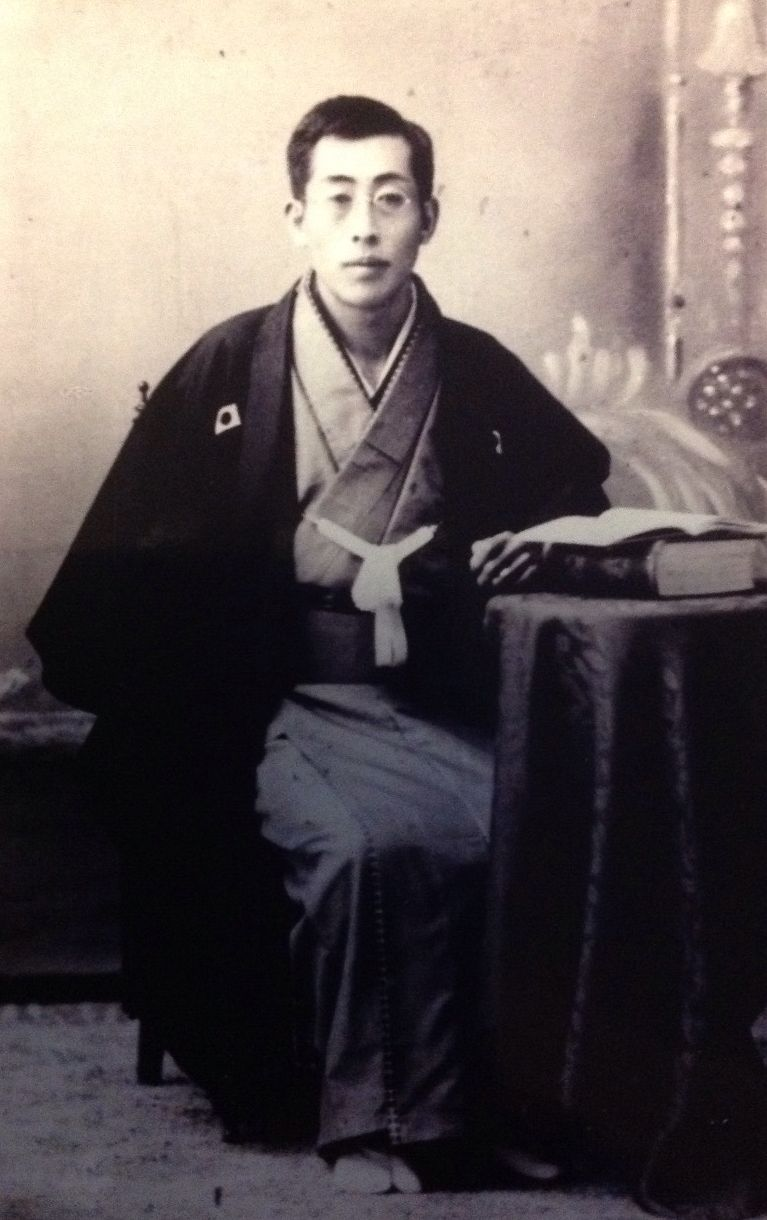
- Born: 10 January 1873; Akita Prefecture, Japan
- Died: 27 April 1966 (aged 93)
- Other name: 二木 謙三
- Occupation: Doctor

Kenzō Futaki (二木 謙三, Futaki Kenzō; 10 January 1873 – 27 April 1966) was a Japanese doctor who studied infectious diseases.

Futaki was educated at Tokyo Imperial University. He received the prestigious Order of Culture (Bunka Kunshō) from the Emperor for his academic contributions, which included identifying the infectious agents of dysentery and rat bite fever. He was a candidate for the Nobel Prize in Physiology or Medicine. In addition to his medical research, he had a strong understanding of traditional Japanese folk remedies.
