= Sukeshiro Terata =

Japanese politician (born 1940)

- 寺田 典城
- Official portrait, 2003

Member of the House of Councillors
- In office 26 July 2010 – 25 July 2016
- Constituency: National PR

Governor of Akita Prefecture
- In office 20 April 1997 – 19 April 2009
- Monarch: Akihito
- Preceded by: Kikuji Sasaki
- Succeeded by: Norihisa Satake

Mayor of Yokote
- In office April 1991 – 2 April 1997
- Preceded by: Kenzō Chida
- Succeeded by: Chūetsu Igarashi

Personal details
- Born: 19 June 1940 (age 86) Daisen, Akita, Japan
- Party: Independent
- Other political affiliations: Your Party (2010–2013); Unity (2013–2014); Innovation (2014–2016)
- Children: Manabu Terata
- Relatives: Shizuka Terata (daughter-in-law)
- Education: Waseda University

Sukeshiro Terata (寺田 典城, Terata Sukeshiro; born 19 June 1940) is a retired Japanese politician who served as the governor of Akita Prefecture from 1997 to 2009.

== Early life and education ==
Terata is a native of Ōmagari, Akita and graduate of Waseda University.

== Political career ==
Terata was first elected to the post of governor in 1997 after serving as mayor of Yokote, Akita since 1991.

He ran in House of Councillors election in 2010 as a proportional candidate of Your Party, received 45,846 votes nationwide and won a seat ranking 4th on his party list. He served until his retirement in 2016.

He attempted to run once more for Governor of Akita after this, but was defeated.
