= Koji Futada =

Japanese politician (born 1938)

- 二田 孝治
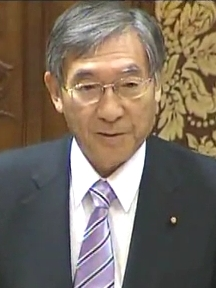
- Futada in 2008

Member of the House of Representatives
- In office 7 July 1986 – 21 July 2009
- Preceded by: Risaburō Nakagawa
- Succeeded by: Multi-member district
- Constituency: Akita 1st (1986–1996); Tohoku PR (1996–2000); Akita 1st (2000–2003); Tohoku PR (2003–2009)

Member of the Akita Prefectural Assembly
- In office 1975–1986

Personal details
- Born: 4 May 1938 (age 88) Akita Prefecture, Japan
- Party: Liberal Democratic
- Parent: Korenori Futada (father)
- Education: Chuo University

Koji Futada (二田 孝治, Futada Kōji; born 4 May 1938) is a retired Japanese politician of the Liberal Democratic Party, who served as a member of the House of Representatives in the Diet (national legislature). A native of Minamiakita District, Akita and a graduate of Chuo University, he was elected to the assembly of Akita Prefecture for the first time in 1975 and to the House of Representatives for the first time in 1986.
