= Minamiakita District, Akita =

District in Akita prefecture, Japan

Coordinates: 39.943°N 140.139°E

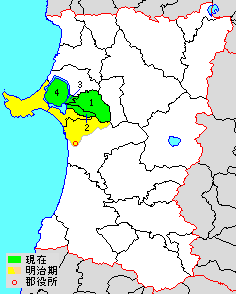
Map showing original extent of Minamiakita District in Akita Prefecture: Green: current; Yellow: former extent in early Meiji period; 1. Gojōme; 2. Ikawa; 3. Hachirōgata; 4. Ōgata

Minamiakita District (南秋田郡, Minamiakita-gun) is a rural district located in Akita Prefecture, Japan.

As of April 2022, the district has an estimated population of 21,449 and an area of 449.94 km^{2}. All of the cities of Oga and Katagami and part of the city of Akita were formerly part of Minamiakita District.

== Towns and villages ==
- Gojōme
- Hachirōgata
- Ikawa
- Ōgata

== History ==
The area of Minamiakita District was formerly part of Akita District [ja], Dewa Province, and came under the new province of Ugo Province on January 19, 1869 following the Meiji restoration. At the time, the area consisted of 2 towns and 166 villages formerly under the control of Kubota Domain, based at Akita. The area became part of Akita Prefecture in 1871, and was organized as Minamiakita District in 1878.

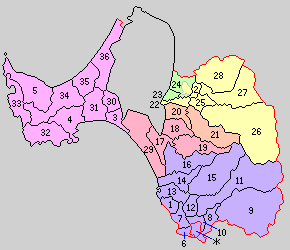
Historic Map of Minamiakita District: Purple: Akita City; Pink: Oga City; Salmon: Katagami City; Yellow: Gojōme Town; Green: Hachirōgata Town; Orange: Ikawa Town; 1. Tsuchizaki Minato; 2. Gojume; 3. Funakoshi; 4. Funakawa; 5. Kitaura; 6. Kawashiri; 7. Terauchi; 8. Hiroyamada; 9. Taihei; 10. Shimo-Asahikawa; 11. Kami-Asahikawa; 12. Soto-Asahikawa; 13. Iijima; 14. Shimo-Shinjo; 15. Kami-Shinjo; 16. Kanaashi; 17. Okubo; 18. Iitagawa; 19. Toyokawa; 20. Shimoikawa; 21. Kamiikawa; 22. Okawa; 23. Hitoichi; 24. Omogata; 25. Magawa; 26. Babame; 27. Futtsunai; 28. Uchikawa; 29. Tenno; 30. Futto; 31. Wakimoto; 32. Minamiiso; 33. Toga; 34. Oganaka; 35. Goriai; 36. Katanishi

With the establishment of the municipality system on April 1, 1889, one town (Tsuchizaki Minato) and 35 villages were established. Funakawa Minato was raised to town status on October 24, 1894, followed by Gojōme on January 19, 1896 and Kitaura on June 4, 1902. Funakoshi became a town on December 20, 1904, followed by Okubo on April 1, 1924 and Hitoichi on December 1, 1925 and Terauchi on August 1, 1933, Iitagawa on November 30, 1935.

Tsuchizaki Minato and Terauchi were annexed by Akita City on April 1, 1941 and the towns of Iitagawa and Okubo joined to form the town of Showa on March 24, 1942. However, on September 28, 1950 a portion of the town of Showa split away to re-create the town of Iitagawa. The town of Funakawa merged with four neighboring villages to create the city of Oga on March 31, 1954, which subsequently annexed the towns of Funakoshi and Kitaura on March 1, 1955. On September 30, 1956, Hitoichi was renamed Hachirōgata. Tenno was raised to town status on November 3, 1961, followed by Wakami on November 1, 1970 and Iikawa on August 1, 1974.

In 2006, as part of the Heisei period Municipal mergers and dissolutions in Japan, the remaining seven towns and one village in the district were reduced to the present three towns and one village:

- On March 22, 2005 - the towns of Iitagawa, Shōwa and Tennō were merged to create the city of Katagami.
- On March 22, 2005 - the town of Wakami was merged into the expanded city of Oga.
