= Hachirōgata, Akita =

Hachirōgata 八郎潟町
- Town
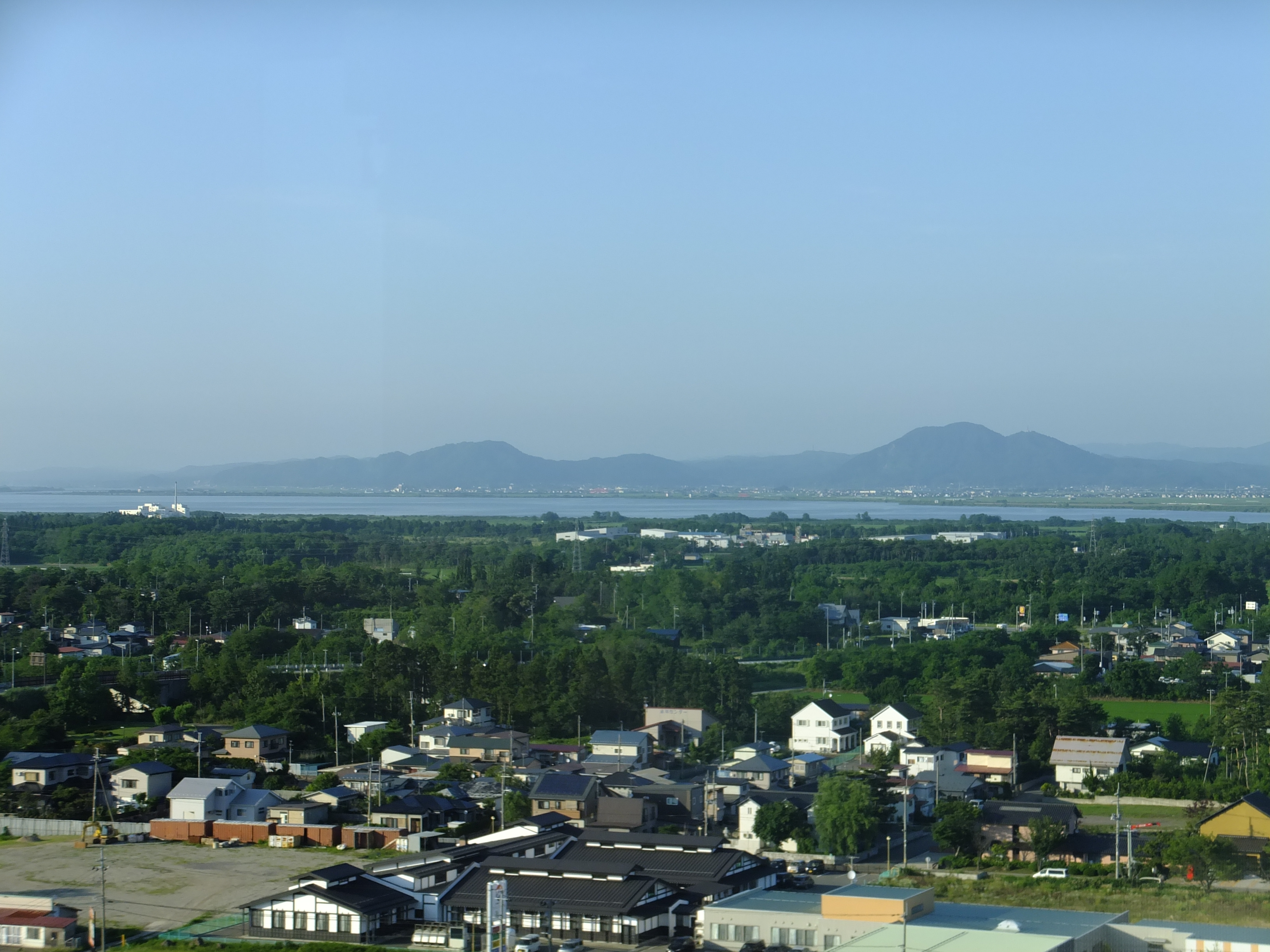
- Panorama view of Hachirōgata, from Tennō Sky Tower

- Flag Seal
- Interactive map of Hachirōgata
- Coordinates: 39°56′58″N 140°4′24″E
- Country: Japan
- Region: Tōhoku
- Prefecture: Akita
- District: Minamiakita

Government
  - Mayor: Kiku Hatayama (from September 2008)

Area
  - Total: 17.00 km^{2} (6.56 sq mi)

Population (February 1, 2023)
  - Total: 5,603
  - Density: 329.6/km^{2} (853.6/sq mi)
- Time zone: UTC+9 (Japan Standard Time)
- Phone number: 018-875-5800
- Address: Jidaidō 80, Hachirōgata-machi, Minamiakita-gun, Akita-ken 018-1692
- Website: Official website
- Symbols
- Flower: Azalea
- Tree: Japanese Zelkova

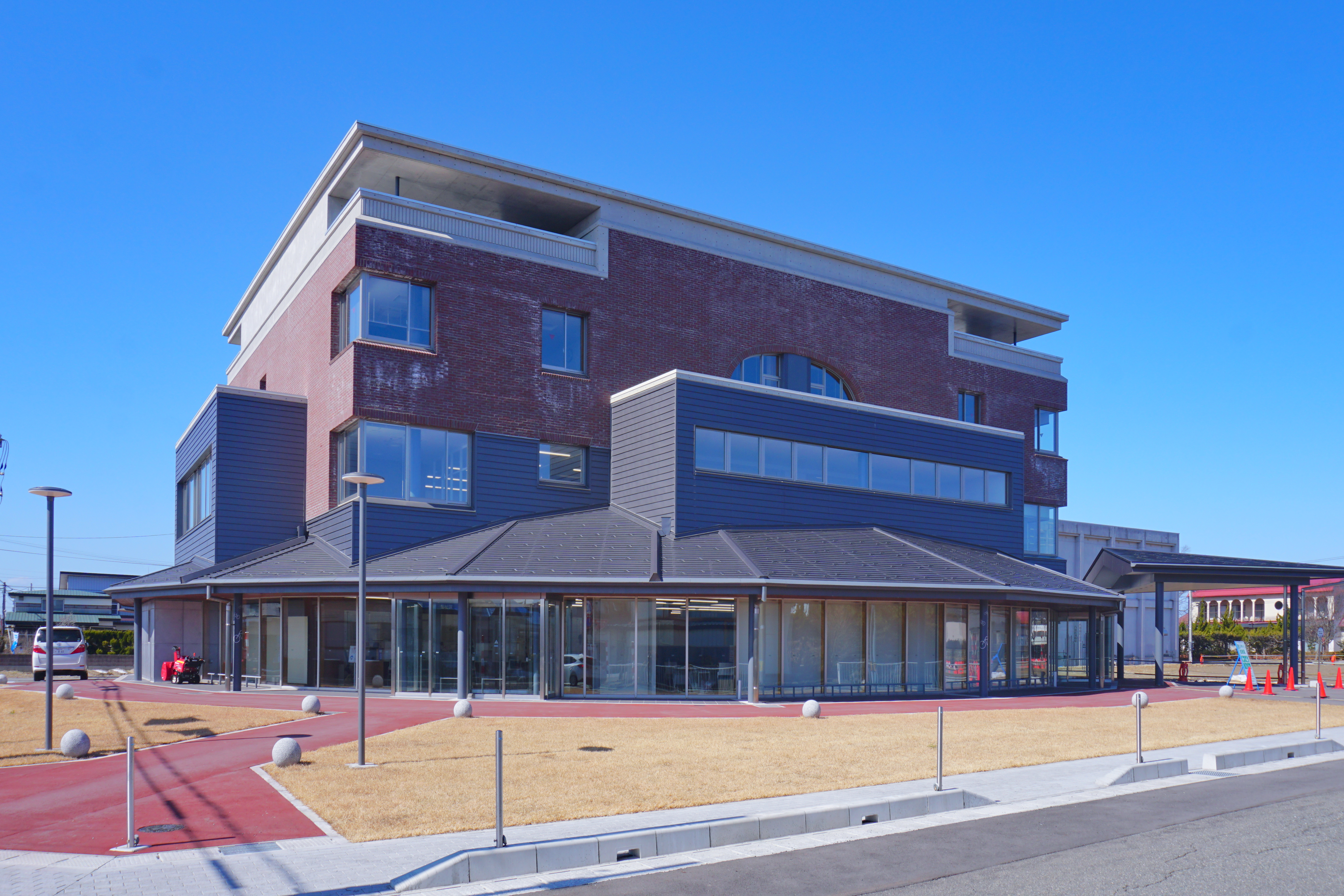
Hachirōgata Town Hall

Hachirōgata (八郎潟町, Hachirōgata-machi) is a town located in Akita, Japan. As of 1 February 2023, the town had an estimated population of 5603 in 2465 households, and a population density of 330 persons per km^{2}. The total area is 17.00 square kilometres (6.56 sq mi). It is the smallest municipality in Akita Prefecture in terms of surface area.

== Geography ==
Hachirōgata is located in the coastal flatlands northeastern Akita Prefecture, bordered by the remnant of Lake Hachirōgata which lies in the west of the town. Lake Hachirōgata was the second largest lake in Japan until it was drained in a land reclamation project from 1957 to 1977.The town is about 30 kilometers north of the prefectural capital at Akita City.

=== Neighboring municipalities ===
Akita Prefecture

- Gojōme
- Ikawa
- Mitane
- Ōgata

== Climate ==
Hachirōgata has a humid continental climate (Köppen climate classification Cfa) with large seasonal temperature differences, with warm to hot (and often humid) summers and cold (sometimes severely cold) winters. Precipitation is significant throughout the year, but is heaviest from August to October. The average annual temperature in Hachirōgata is 11.1 °C. The average annual rainfall is 1612 mm with September as the wettest month. The temperatures are highest on average in August, at around 24.8 °C, and lowest in January, at around -1.0 °C.

== Demographics ==
Per Japanese census data, the population of Hachirōgata peaked at around the year 1950 and has been in steady decline since then.

Historical population

Year	Pop.	±% p.a.
1920	5,831	—
1930	6,568	+1.20%
1940	7,166	+0.88%
1950	8,743	+2.01%
1960	8,358	−0.45%
1970	8,180	−0.22%

Year	Pop.	±% p.a.
1980	8,228	+0.06%
1990	8,153	−0.09%
2000	7,533	−0.79%
2010	6,624	−1.28%
2020	5,583	−1.70%

== History ==
The area of present-day Hachirōgata was part of ancient Dewa Province, dominated by the Satake clan during the Edo period, who ruled Kubota Domain under the Tokugawa shogunate. The village of Omogata was established in 1889 with the establishment of the modern municipalities system, the town of Hitoichi in 1925. The two merged in 1956 to form the town of Hachirōgata. Efforts to merge the town with neighboring Gojōme and Ikawa failed to pass a referendum in 2005.

== Government ==
Hachirōgata has a mayor-council form of government with a directly elected mayor and a unicameral town council of 12 members. Hachirōgata, together with the other municipalities of Minamiakita District contributes one member to the Akita Prefectural Assembly. In terms of national politics, the town is part of Akita 2nd district of the lower house of the Diet of Japan.

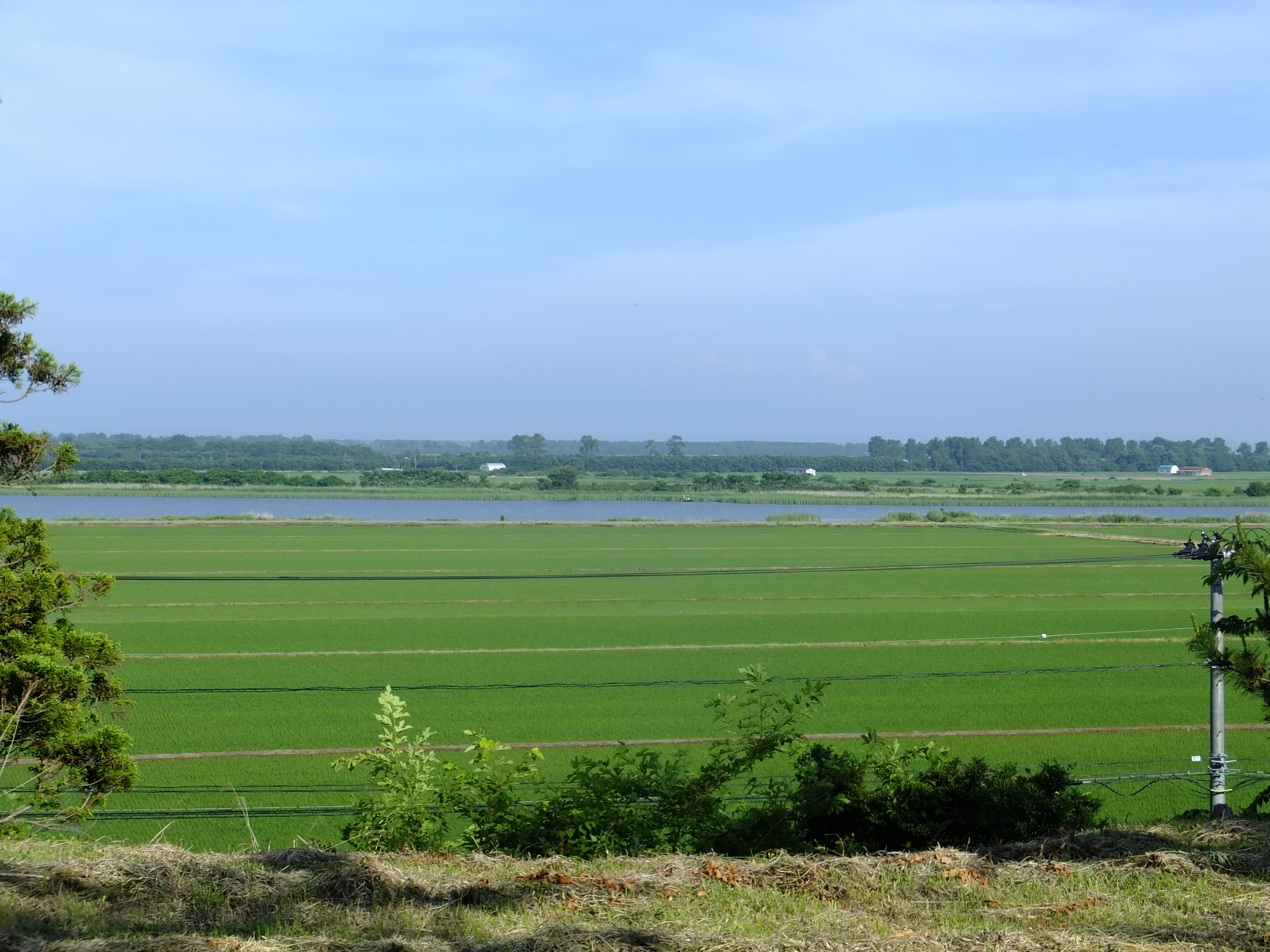
Panoramic view of Hachirōgata and Ōgata, from Oga

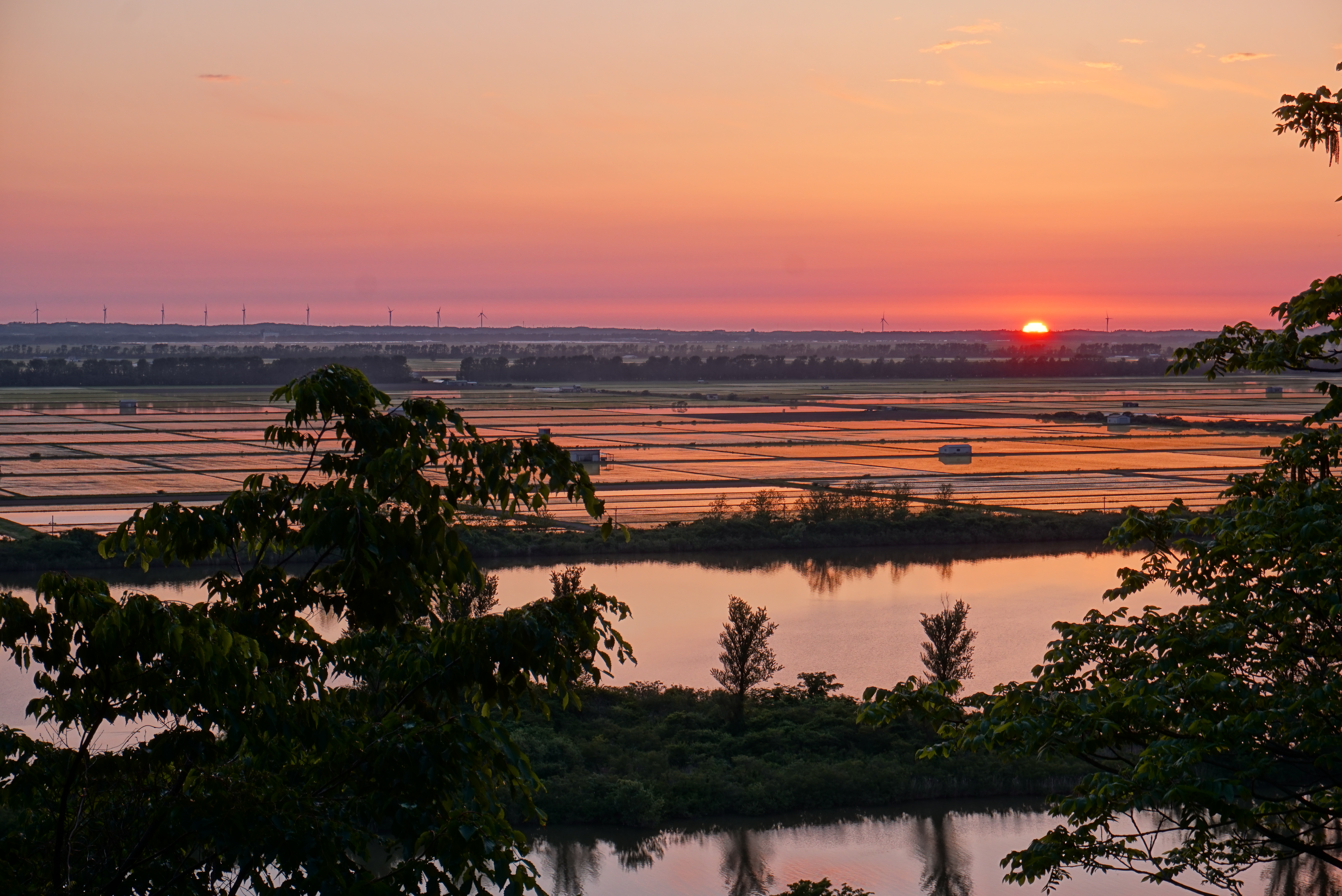
A sunset view of Hachirōgata, from Mikurabana Park

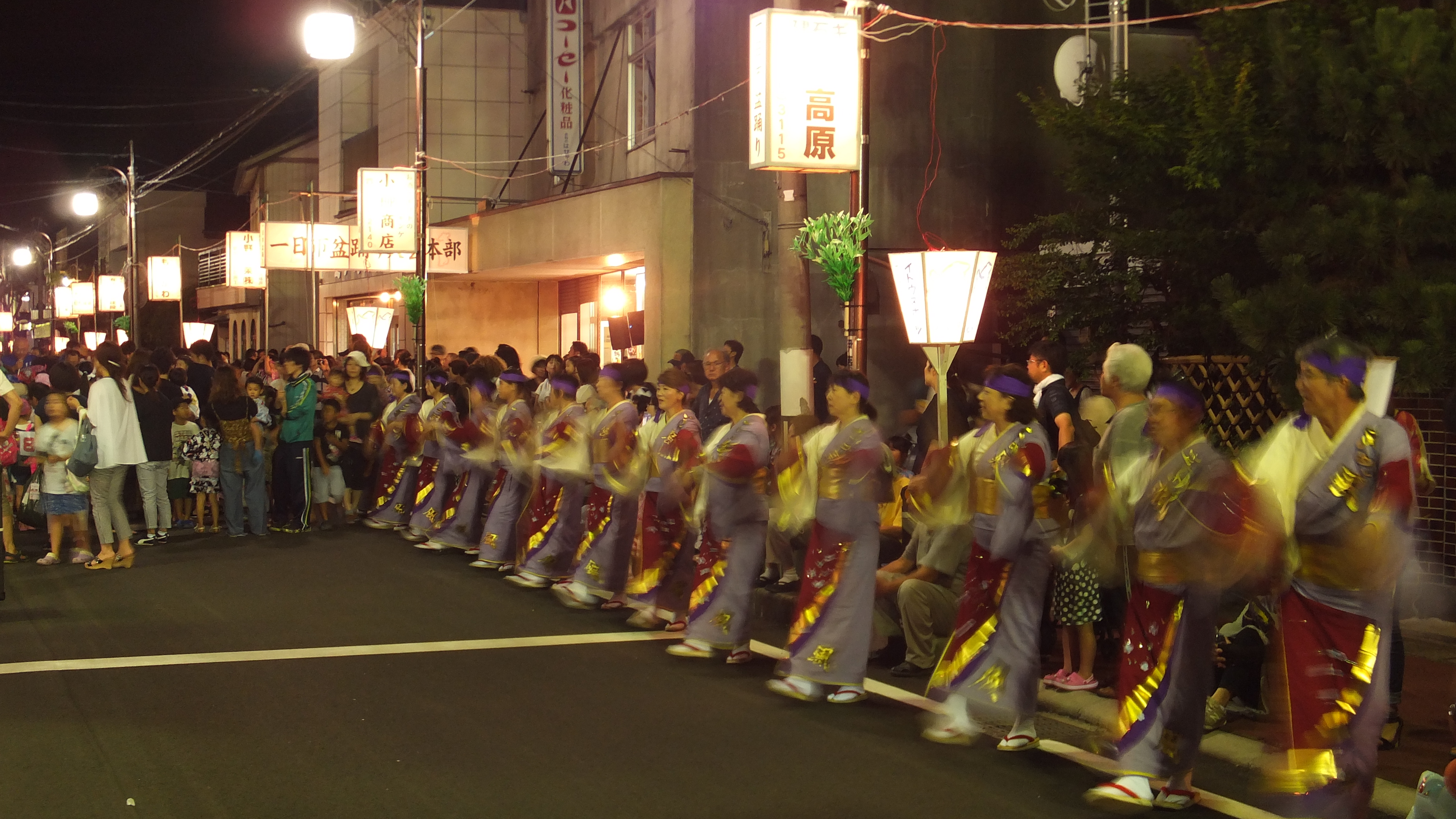
Hitoichi Bon dancing festival

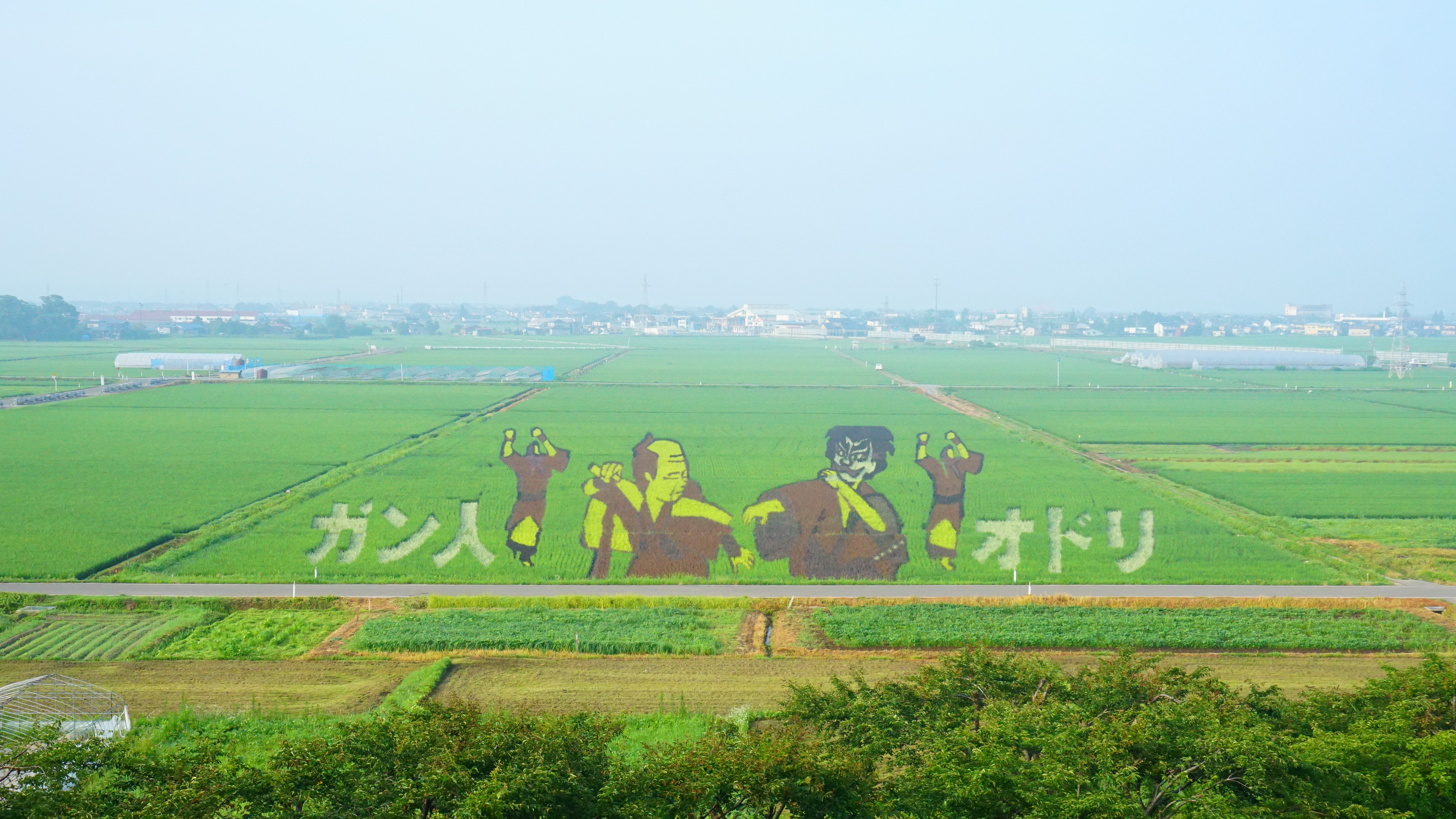
Tanbo art in Hachirogata

== Economy ==
The economy of Hachirōgata is based on agriculture and commercial fishing.

== Education ==
Hachirōgata has one public elementary schools and one public middle schools operated by the town government. The town does not have a high school.

== Transportation ==
=== Railway ===
East Japan Railway Company - Ōu Main Line

- Hachirōgata

=== Highway ===
- Akita Expressway
- National Route 7

== Notable peoples ==
- Chiharu Shida, Japanese national badminton player
