= Tennō, Akita =

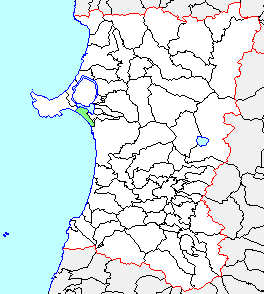
- Interactive map of Tennō, Akita
- Country: Japan
- Prefecture: Akita
- District: Minamiakita

Tennō (天王町, Tennō-machi) was a town located in Minamiakita District, Akita Prefecture, Japan.

In 2003, the town had an estimated population of 22,115 and a density of 532.76 persons per km^{2}. The total area was 41.51 km^{2}.

On March 22, 2005, Tennō, along with the towns of Iitagawa and Shōwa (all from Minamiakita District), merged to create the city of Katagami.

== Noted people from Tennō ==
- Koji Futada, politician
- Kenichi Kaga, professional soccer player
- Kōsei Yoshida, professional baseball player
