= Funakoshi Station =

Railway station in Oga, Akita Prefecture, Japan

Funakoshi Station 船越駅
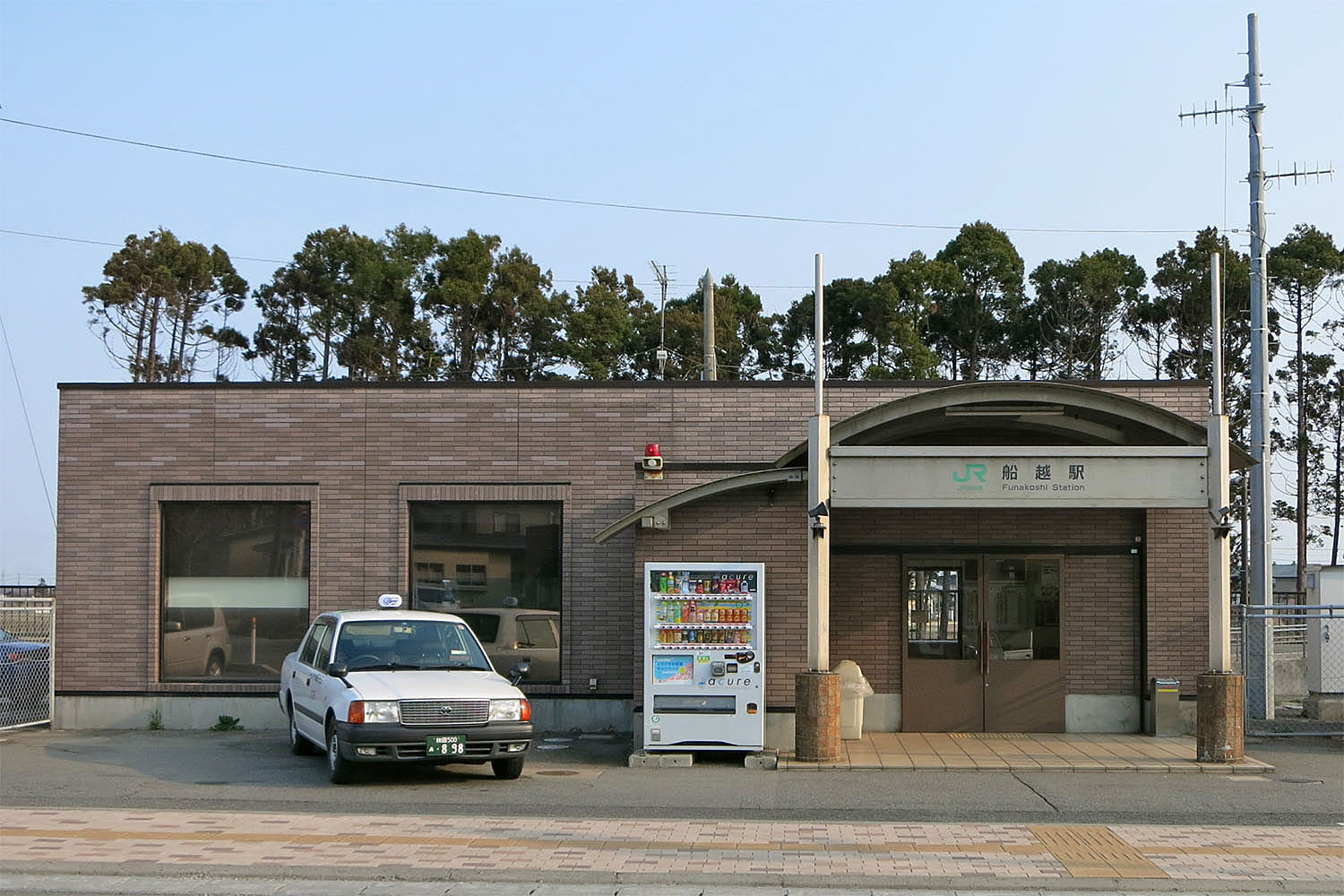
- Funakoshi Station, April 2014

General information
- Location: Kitsunemori-52 Funakoshi, Oga-shi, Akita-ken 010-0341; Japan
- Coordinates: 39°54′17.1″N 139°56′49.8″E
- Operator: JR East
- Line: ■ Oga Line
- Distance: 14.8 kilometers from Oiwake
- Platforms: 1 side platform

Other information
- Status: Staffed
- Website: Official website

History
- Opened: November 8, 1914

Passengers
- FY2018: 566

Services
Preceding station	JR East	Following station
Tennō towards Akita	Oga Line	Wakimoto towards Oga
Location
- Location within Akita Prefecture Location within Japan

Funakoshi Station (船越駅, Funakoshi-eki) is a railway station in the city of Oga, Akita Prefecture, Japan, operated by East Japan Railway Company (JR East).

== Lines ==
Funakoshi Station is a station of the Oga Line and is located 14.8 rail kilometers from the terminus of the line at Oiwake Station and 23.4 kilometers from Akita. .

== Station layout ==
The station has one side platform serving a single bi-directional track. The station building also houses a "Newdays" convenience store and is staffed.

== History ==
Funakoshi Station was opened on November 8, 1914 as a station on the Japanese Government Railways (JGR) serving the town of Funakoshi, Akita. The JGR became the JNR (Japan National Railways) after World War II. With the privatization of the JNR on April 1, 1987, the station has been managed by JR East.

== Passenger statistics ==
In fiscal 2018, the station was used by an average of 566 passengers daily (boarding passengers only).

== Surrounding area ==
- Funakoshi Post Office
- National Route 101

== See also ==
- List of railway stations in Japan
