= Wakimoto Station =

Railway station in Oga, Akita Prefecture, Japan

Wakimoto Station 脇本駅
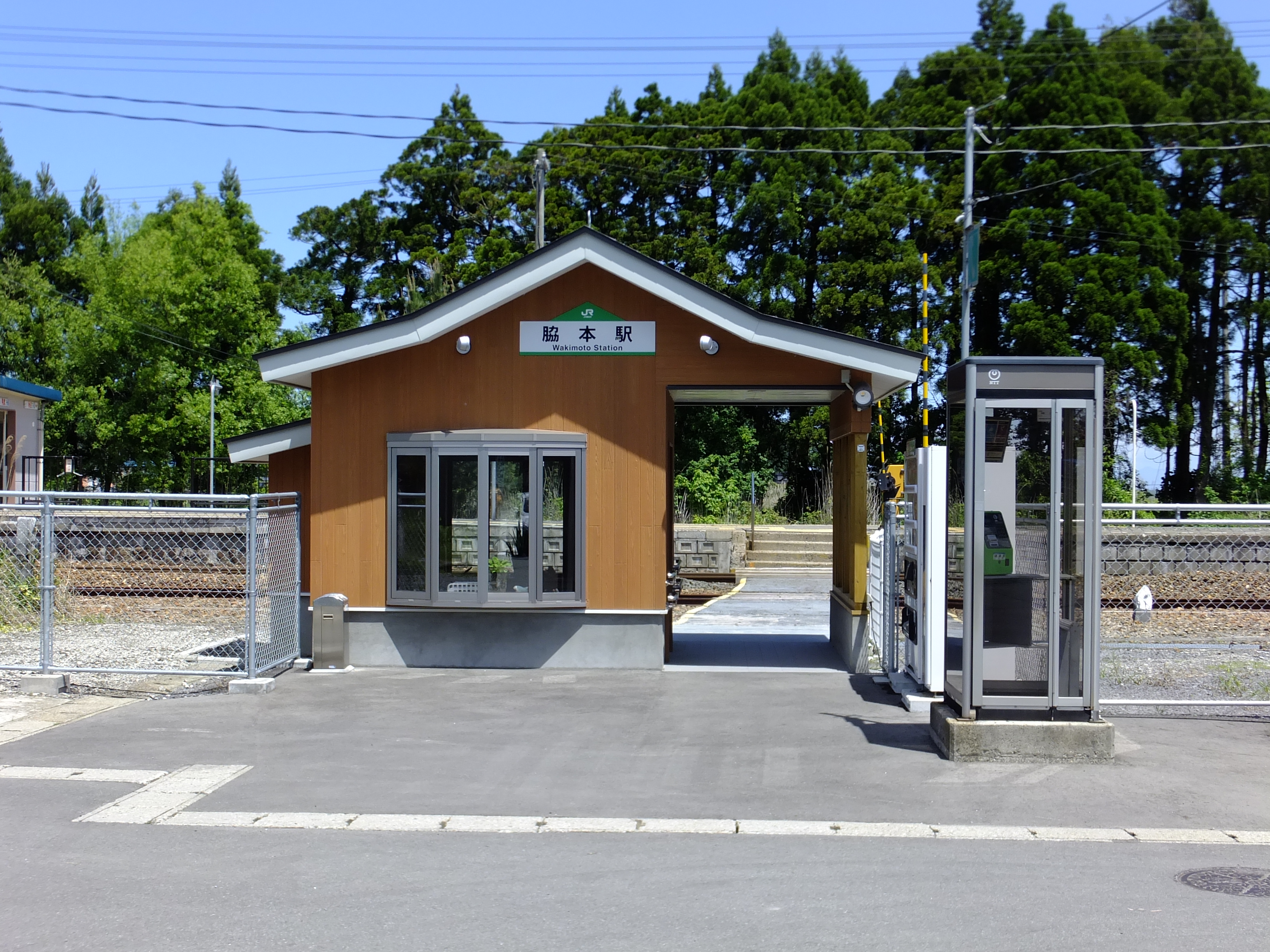
- Wakimoto Station in May 2018

General information
- Location: 13 Magarita, Wakimoto, Oga-shi, Akita-ken 010-0342; Japan
- Coordinates: 39°54′54″N 139°54′10.7″E
- Operator: JR East
- Line: ■ Oga Line
- Distance: 18.9 km from Oiwake
- Platforms: 1 island platform
- Tracks: 2

Other information
- Status: Unstaffed
- Website: Official website

History
- Opened: 8 November 1914

Passengers
- FY2009: 205 daily

Services
Preceding station	JR East	Following station
Funakoshi towards Akita	Oga Line	Hadachi towards Oga
Location
- Location within Akita Prefecture Location within Japan

Wakimoto Station (脇本駅, Wakimoto-eki) is a railway station on the Oga Line in the city of Oga, Akita Prefecture, Japan, operated by East Japan Railway Company (JR East).

== Lines ==
Wakimoto Station is served by the Oga Line and is located 18.9 kilometers from the southern terminus of the Oga Line at Oiwake .

== Station layout ==
The station has one island platform, connected to the station building by a level crossing. The station is unattended.

=== Platforms ===
1	■ Oga Line	for Oga
2	■ Oga Line	for Oiwake and Akita

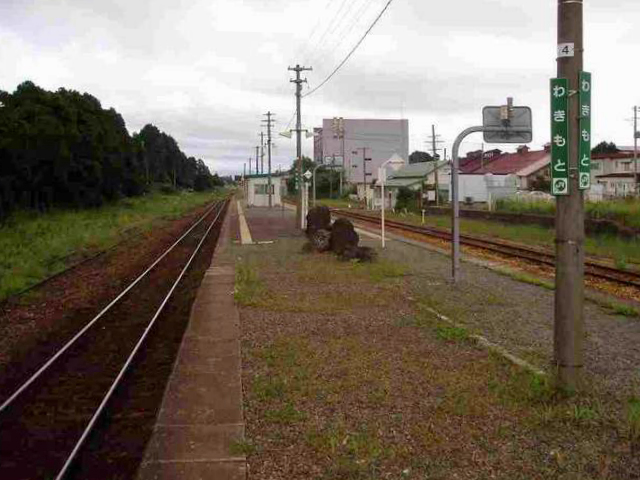
The platform in September 2003

== History ==
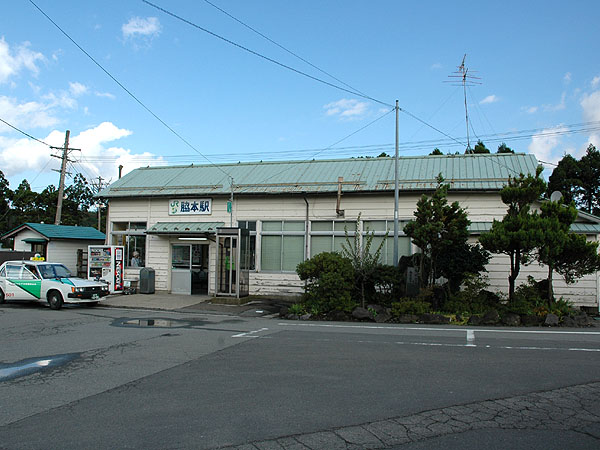
The station building in October 2005, before rebuilding

Wakimoto Station opened on November 8, 1914, as a station on the Japanese Government Railways (JGR) serving the village of Wakimoto. JGR became JNR (Japanese National Railways) after World War II. With the privatization of JNR on April 1, 1987, the station came under the control of JR East. It has been unattended since April 2011.

== Passenger statistics ==
In fiscal 2009, the station was used by an average of 205 passengers daily (boarding passengers only). The passenger figures for previous years are as shown below.

Fiscal year	Daily average
2000	358
2005	274
2009	205

== Surrounding area ==
- National Route 101
- Wakimoto Post Office
- Wakimoto No. 1 Elementary School

== See also ==
- List of railway stations in Japan
