= Kami-Iijima Station =

Railway station in Akita, Akita Prefecture, Japan

Kami-Iijima Station 上飯島駅
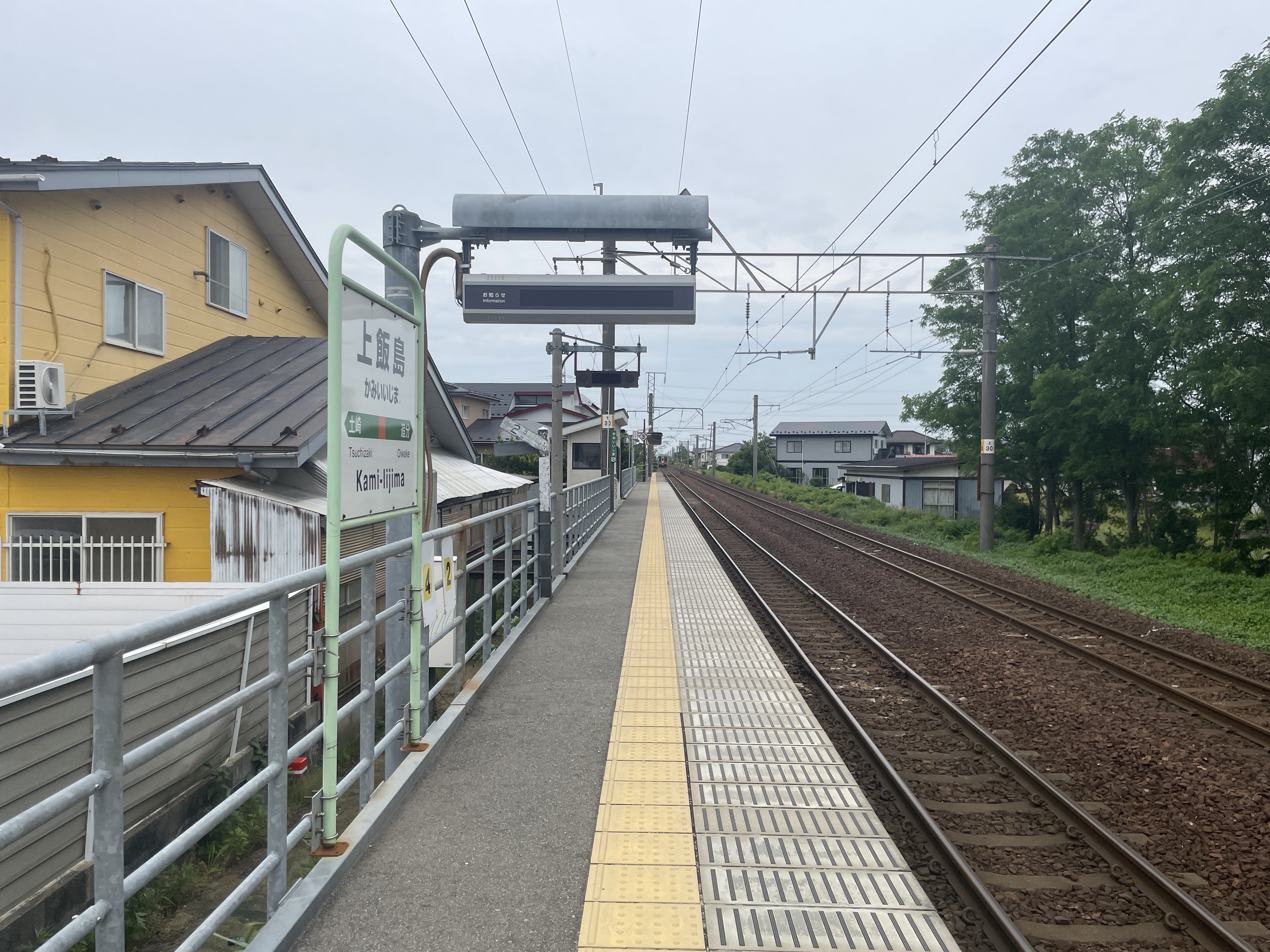
- Northbound platform in June, 2023

General information
- Location: Iijima-nezumita, Akita-shi, Akita-ken011-0913; Japan
- Coordinates: 39.7792°N 140.0685°E
- Operator: JR East
- Lines: ■ Ōu Main Line; ■ Oga Line
- Distance: 308.3 kilometers from Fukushima
- Platforms: 2 side platforms

Other information
- Status: Unstaffed
- Website: Official website

History
- Opened: February 10, 1964.

Services
Preceding station	JR East	Following station
Tsuchizaki towards Akita	Ōu Main Line Rapid	Oiwake towards Aomori
Tsuchizaki towards Shinjō	Ōu Main Line Local	Oiwake towards Aomori
Tsuchizaki towards Akita	Oga Line	Oiwake towards Oga
Location
- Location within Akita Prefecture Location within Japan

Kami-Iijima Station (上飯島駅, Kami-Iijima-eki) is a railway station in the city of Akita, Akita Prefecture, Japan, operated by East Japan Railway Company (JR East).

== Lines ==
Kami-Iijima Station is served by the Ōu Main Line, and is located 308.3 km from the starting point of the line at Fukushima Station. The Oga Line train services also stop at this station, which is past the nominal terminus of the line at Oiwake.

== Station layout ==
The station has two unnumbered opposed side platforms serving two tracks connected by an underground passage. The station is unattended.

=== Platforms ===
west	■ Oga Line	for Higashi-Noshiro and Hirosaki
west	■ Ōu Main Line	for Oga
east	■ Ōu Main Line	for Akita and Ōmagari

== History ==
Kami-Iijima Station began as Kami-Iijima Signal Stop on September 2, 1944. It was closed from July 11, 1949 and reopened on April 10, 1954. It was made a passenger station on February 10, 1964. The station was absorbed into the JR East network upon the privatization of JNR on April 1, 1987.

== Surrounding area ==
- National Route 7
- Iijima Elementary School

== See also ==
- List of railway stations in Japan
