= Futada Station =

Railway station in Katagami, Akita Prefecture, Japan

Futada Station 二田駅
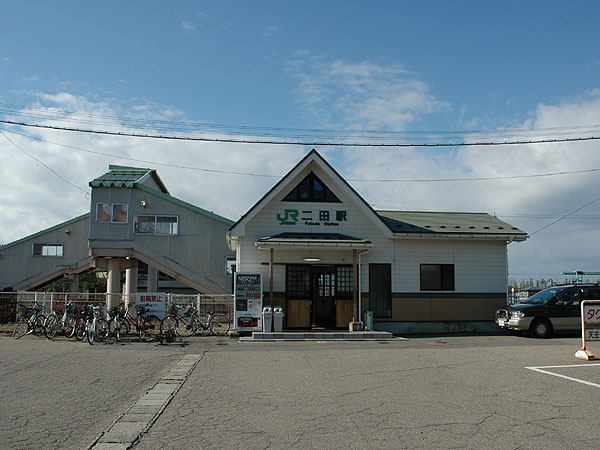
- Futada Station in October 2005

General information
- Location: 47 Kamiegawa, Tennō, Katagami-shi, Akita-ken 010-0201; Japan
- Coordinates: 39°52′54.2″N 139°59′13.8″E
- Operator: JR East
- Line: ■ Oga Line
- Distance: 10.4 kilometers from Oiwake
- Platforms: 1 island platform

Other information
- Status: Staffed
- Website: Official website

History
- Opened: November 9, 1913

Passengers
- FY2018: 309

Services
Preceding station	JR East	Following station
Kamifutada towards Akita	Oga Line	Tennō towards Oga
Location
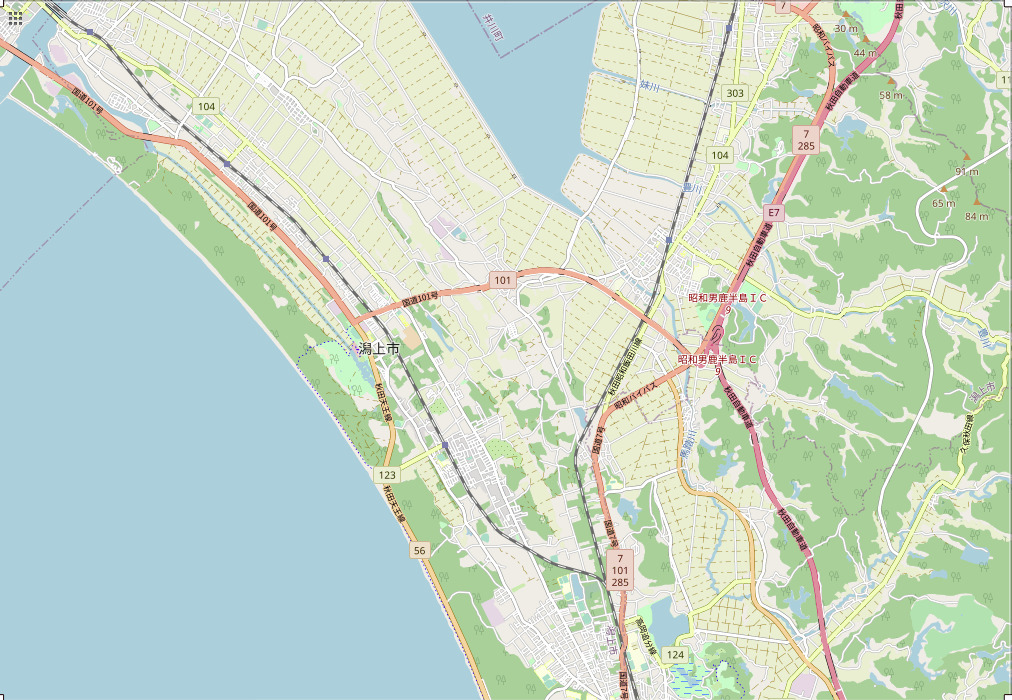
- Location within Katagami, Akita Location within Akita Prefecture Location within Japan

Futada Station (二田駅, Futada-eki) is a railway station in the city of Katagami, Akita Prefecture, Japan, operated by East Japan Railway Company (JR East).

== Lines ==
Futada Station is a station of the Oga Line and is located 10.4 rail kilometers from the terminus of the line at Oiwake Station and 23.4 kilometers from Akita. .

== Station layout ==
Futada Station has a single island platform, connected to the station building by a footbridge. The station is staffed.

=== Platforms ===
1	■ Oga Line	for Oga
2	■ Oga Line	for Oiwake and Akita

== History ==
Futada Station opened on November 9, 1913 as a station on the Japanese Government Railways (JGR), serving the village of Tennō, Akita. The JGR became the Japan National Railway (JNR) after World War II. With the privatization of JNR on April 1, 1987, the station has been managed by JR East. A new station building was completed in August 1994.

== Passenger statistics ==
In fiscal 2018, the station was used by an average of 309 passengers daily (boarding passengers only).

== Surrounding area ==
- Katagami City Hall
- Japan National Route 101
- Tennō Post Office

== See also ==
- List of railway stations in Japan
