= Kamifutada Station =

Railway station in Katagami, Akita Prefecture, Japan

Kamifutada Station 上二田駅
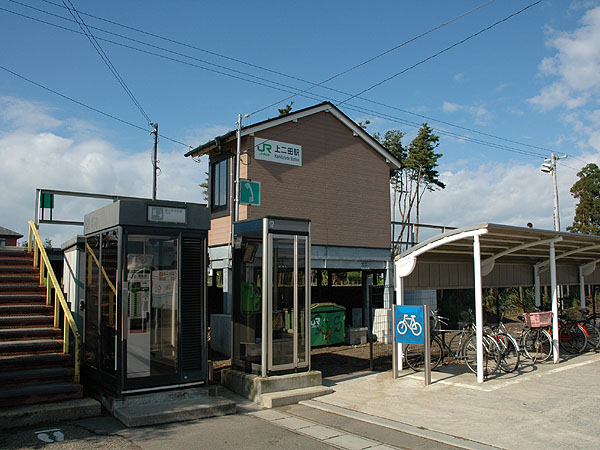
- Kamifutada Station in October 2005

General information
- Location: 8 Gamanuma, Tennō, Katagami-shi, Akita-ken 010-0201; Japan
- Coordinates: 39°52′8.7″N 140°0′14.7″E
- Operator: JR East
- Line: ■ Oga Line
- Distance: 8.3 kilometers from Oiwake
- Platforms: 1 island platform

Other information
- Status: Unstaffed
- Website: Official website

History
- Opened: November 26, 1956

Services
Preceding station	JR East	Following station
Detohama towards Akita	Oga Line	Futada towards Oga
Location
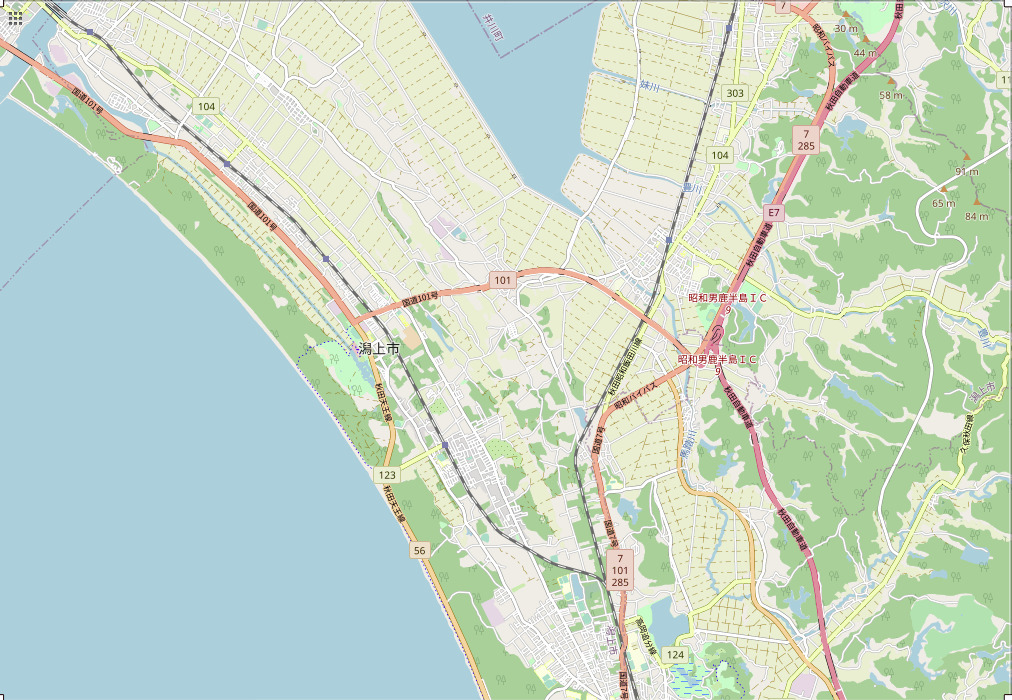
- Location within Katagami, Akita Location within Akita Prefecture Location within Japan

Kamifutada Station (上二田駅, Kamifutada-eki) is a railway station in the city of Katagami, Akita Prefecture, Japan, operated by East Japan Railway Company (JR East).

== Lines ==
Kamifutada Station is a station of the Oga Line and is located 8.3 rail kilometers from the terminus of the line at Oiwake Station and 21.3 kilometers from Akita

== Station layout ==
The station has a single island platform, connected to the station building by a footbridge. The station is unattended.

=== Platforms ===
1	■ Oga Line	for Oga
2	■ Oga Line	for Oiwake and Akita

== History ==
Futada Station opened on November 26, 1956 as a station on the Japan National Railway (JNR), serving the village of Tennō, Akita. With the privatization of JNR on April 1, 1987, the station has been managed by JR East.

== Surrounding area ==
- Katagami City Hall
- Michi-no-eki Tennō

== See also ==
- List of railway stations in Japan
