= Detohama Station =

Railway station in Katagami, Akita Prefecture, Japan

Detohama Station 出戸浜駅
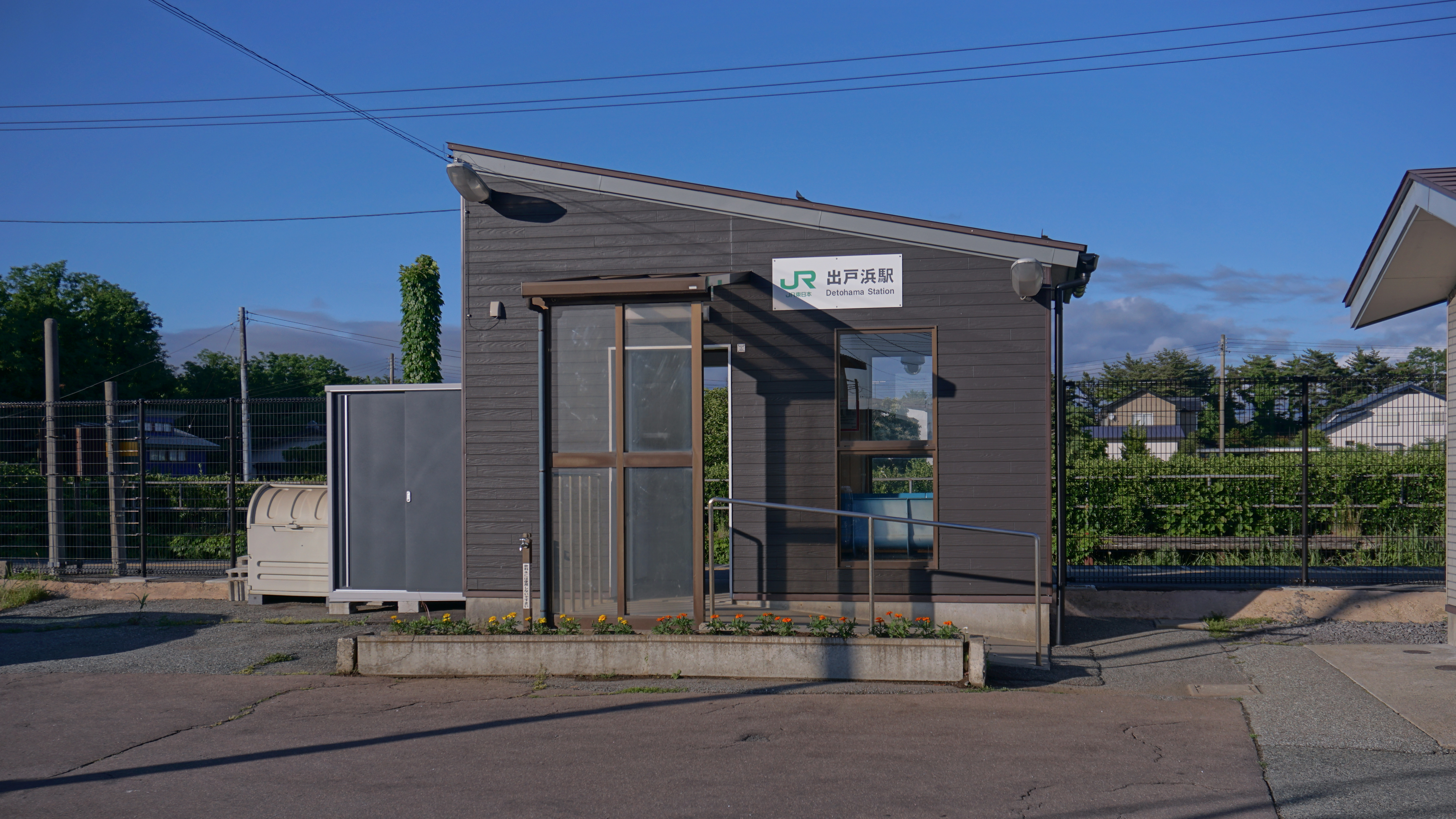
- Detohama Station, June 2023

General information
- Location: 223 Kitano, Tennō, Katagami-shi, Akita-ken 010-0201; Japan
- Coordinates: 39°50′40.12″N 140°1′27.77″E
- Operator: JR East
- Line: ■ Oga Line
- Distance: 5.1 kilometers from Oiwake
- Platforms: 1 side platform

Other information
- Status: Unstaffed
- Website: Official website

History
- Opened: December 25, 1951

Services
Preceding station	JR East	Following station
Oiwake towards Akita	Oga Line	Kamifutada towards Oga
Location
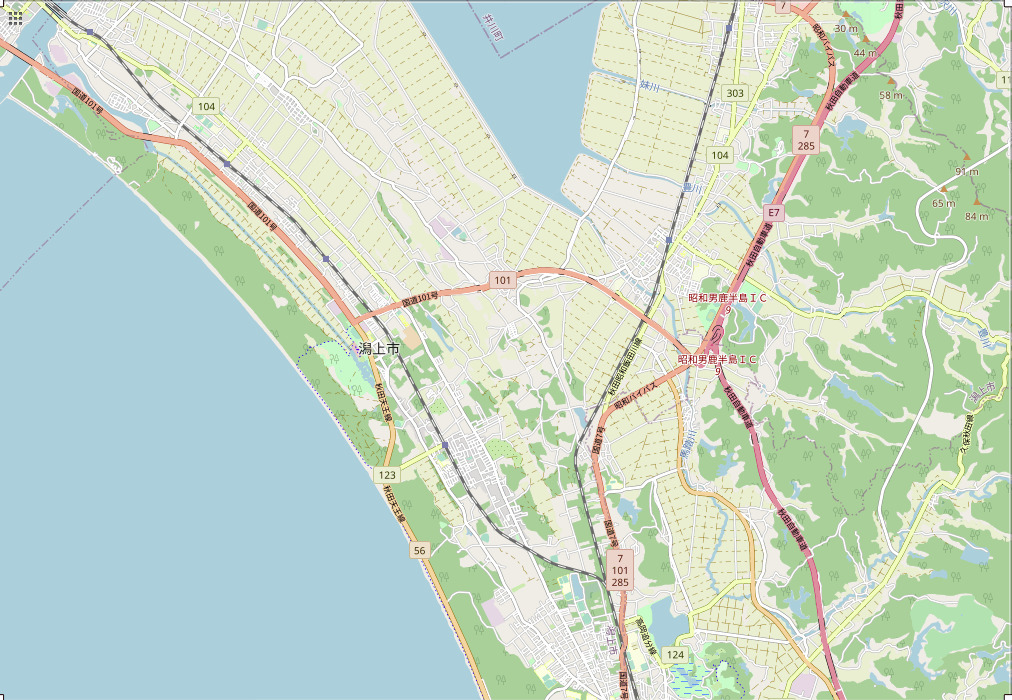
- Location within Katagami, Akita Location within Akita Prefecture Location within Japan

Detohama Station (出戸浜駅, Detohama-eki) is a railway station in the city of Katagami, Akita, Japan, operated by JR East.

== Lines ==
Detohama Station is served by the Oga Line, and is located 5.1 km from the terminus of the line at Oiwake Station and 18.1 kilometers from Akita.

== Station layout ==
The station consists of one side platform serving a single electrified bi-directional track. The station is unattended.

== History ==
Detohama Station began as Detokari Signall (出戸仮乗降場) on July 25, 1950 and was elevated to a full station on the Japan National Railway (JNR) on December 25, 1951. With the privatization of JNR on April 1, 1987, the station has been managed by JR East. A new station building was completed in February 2006.

== Surrounding area ==
- Detohama Beach
