= Tennō Station (Akita) =

Railway station in Katagami, Akita Prefecture, Japan

Tennō Station 天王駅
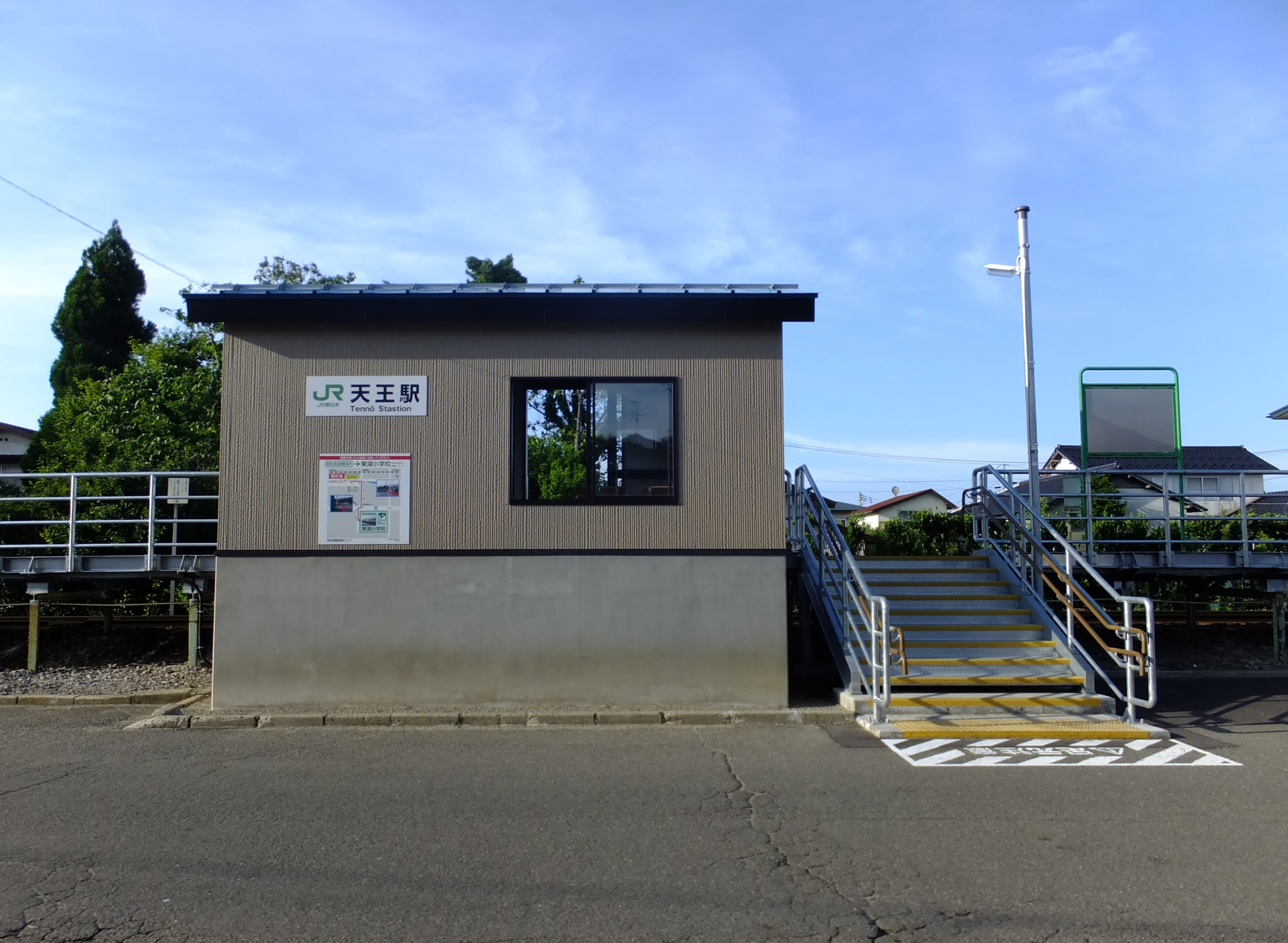
- Tennō Station, June 2017

General information
- Location: Michiai-18 Tennō, Katagami-shi, Akita-ken 010-0201; Japan
- Coordinates: 39.8988°N 139.9635°E
- Operator: JR East
- Line: ■ Oga Line
- Distance: 13.2 kilometers from Oiwake
- Platforms: 1 side platform

Other information
- Status: Unstaffed
- Website: Official website

History
- Opened: November 26, 1956

Services
Preceding station	JR East	Following station
Futada towards Akita	Oga Line	Funakoshi towards Oga
Location
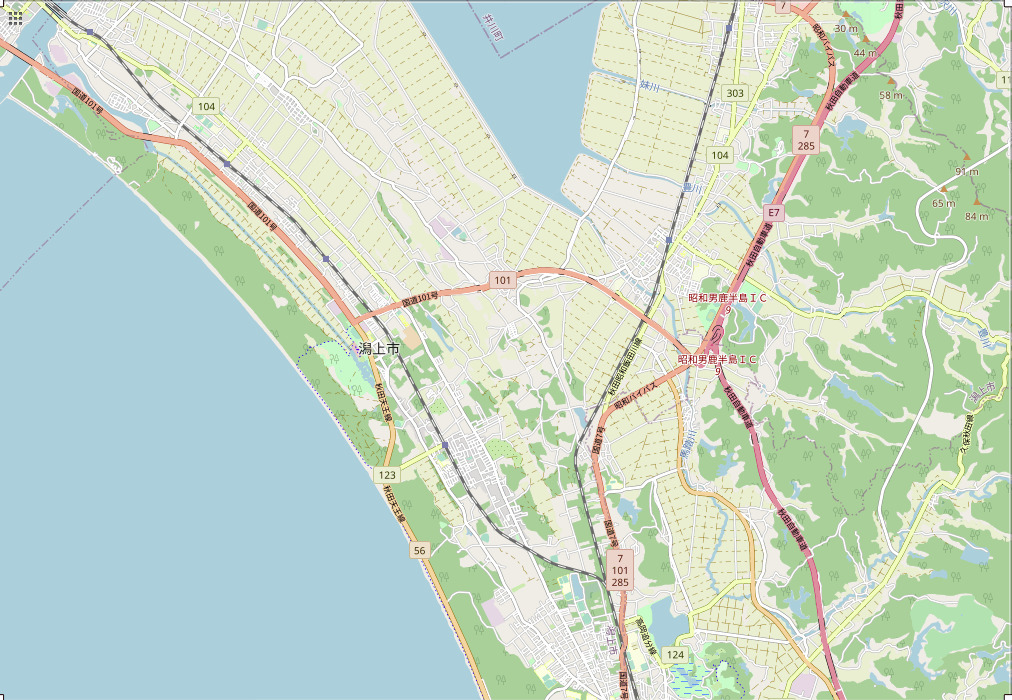
- Location within Katagami, Akita Location within Akita Prefecture Location within Japan

Tennō Station (天王駅, Tennō-eki) is a railway station in the city of Katagami, Akita Prefecture, Japan, operated by East Japan Railway Company (JR East).

== Lines ==
Tennō Station is a station of the Oga Line and is located 13.2 rail kilometers from the terminus of the line at Oiwake Station and 26.2 kilometers from Akita.

== Station layout ==
Tennō Station has one side platform, serving a single bidirectional traffic. The station is unattended.

== History ==
Tennō Station opened on November 26, 1956 as a station on the Japan National Railways (JNR), serving the town of Tennō, Akita. With the privatization of JNR on April 1, 1987, the station has been managed by JR East.

== Surrounding area ==
- National Route 101
- Toko Elementary School

== See also ==
- List of railway stations in Japan
