= Hadachi Station =

Railway station in Oga, Akita Prefecture, Japan

Coordinates: 39°54′17″N 139°51′45″E

Hadachi Station 羽立駅
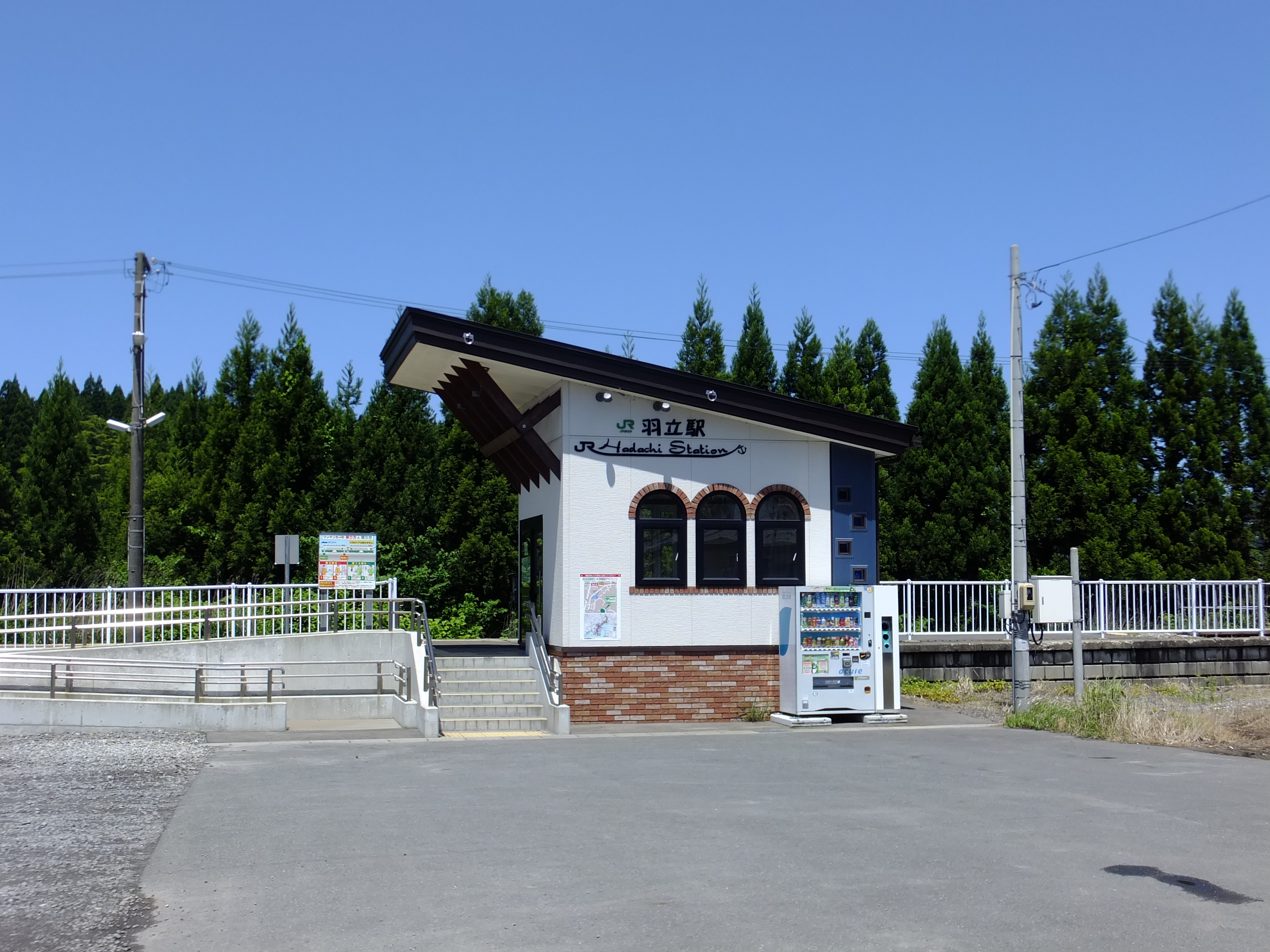
- Hadachi Station, May 2018

General information
- Location: 103 Omaki, Funakawaminato-Hizume, Oga-shi, Akita-ken 010-0502; Japan
- Operator: JR East
- Line: ■ Oga Line
- Distance: 23.7 kilometers from Oiwake
- Platforms: 1 side platform

Other information
- Status: Unstaffed
- Website: Official website

History
- Opened: December 1, 1915

Passengers
- FY2002: 370

Services
Preceding station	JR East	Following station
Wakimoto towards Akita	Oga Line	Oga Terminus
Location
- Location within Akita Prefecture Location within Japan

Hadachi Station (羽立駅, Hadachi-eki) is a railway station in the city of Oga, Akita, Japan, operated by East Japan Railway Company (JR East).

== Lines ==
Hadachi Station is served by the Oga Line and is located 23.7 rail kilometers from the southern terminus of the Oga Line at Oiwake..

== Station layout ==
The station has one side platform, serving a single bidirectional track. The station is unattended.

== History ==
Hadachi Station opened on December 1, 1915. With the privatization of JNR on April 1, 1987, the station has been managed by JR East. It has been unattended since March 2006.

== Passenger statistics ==
In fiscal 2002, the station was used by an average of 370 passengers daily (boarding passengers only).

== Surrounding area ==
- National Route 101

== See also ==
- List of railway stations in Japan
