= Ugo-Iizuka Station =

Railway station in Katagami, Akita Prefecture, Japan

Ugo-Iizuka Station 羽後飯塚駅
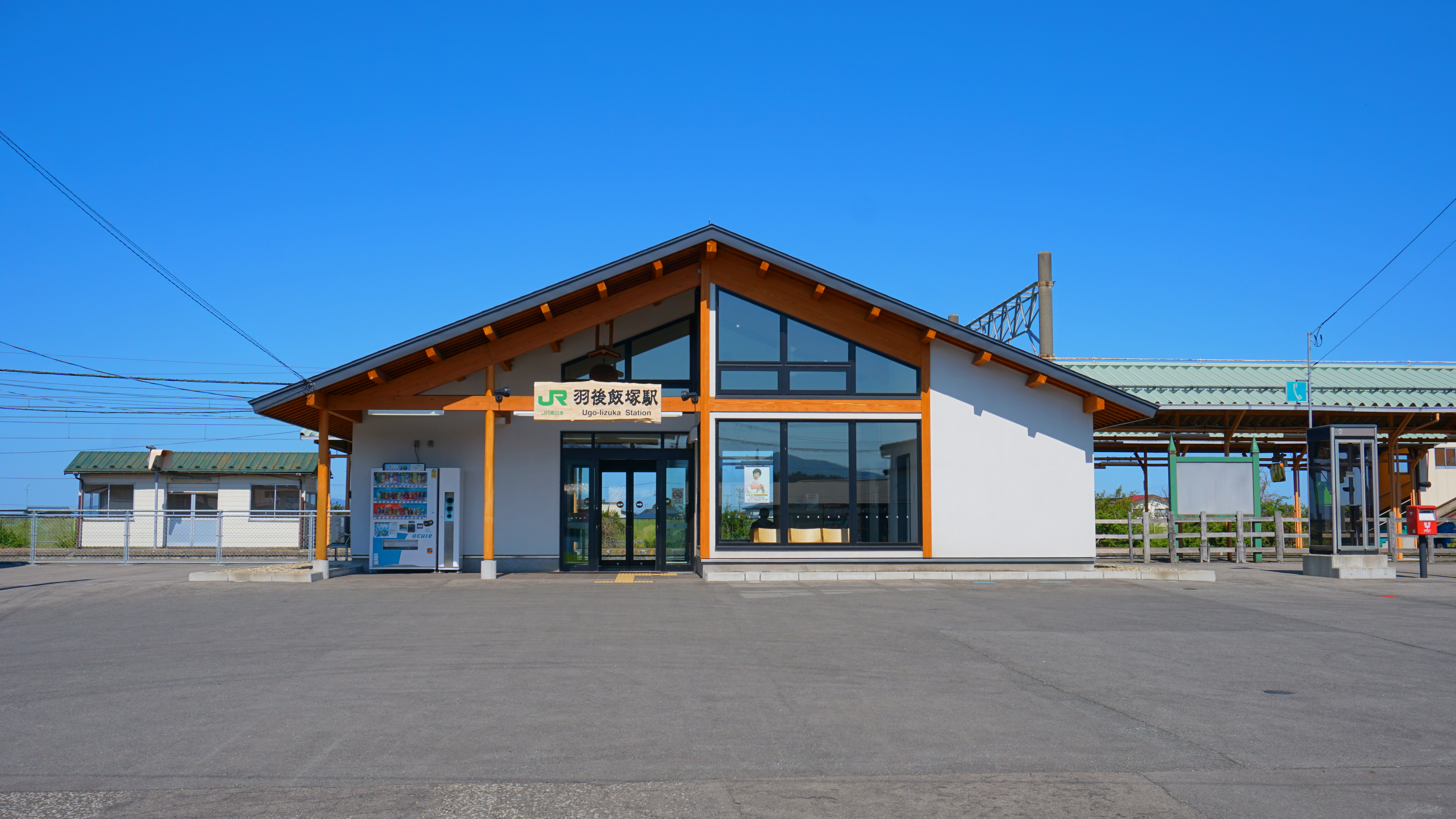
- Ugo-Iizuka Station in May 2019

General information
- Location: Toyonoshita, Iitagawaiizuka, Katagami-shi, Akita-ken 018-1504; Japan
- Coordinates: 39°53′57.2″N 140°4′24.6″E
- Operator: JR East
- Line: ■ Ōu Main Line
- Distance: 322.2 km from Fukushima
- Platforms: 1 side + 1 island platform
- Tracks: 3

Other information
- Website: Official website

History
- Opened: 17 November 1927

Passengers
- FY2018: 106 daily

Services
Preceding station	JR East	Following station
Ōkubo towards Akita	Ōu Main Line Rapid	Ikawa-Sakura towards Aomori
Ōkubo towards Shinjō	Ōu Main Line Local	Ikawa-Sakura towards Aomori
Location
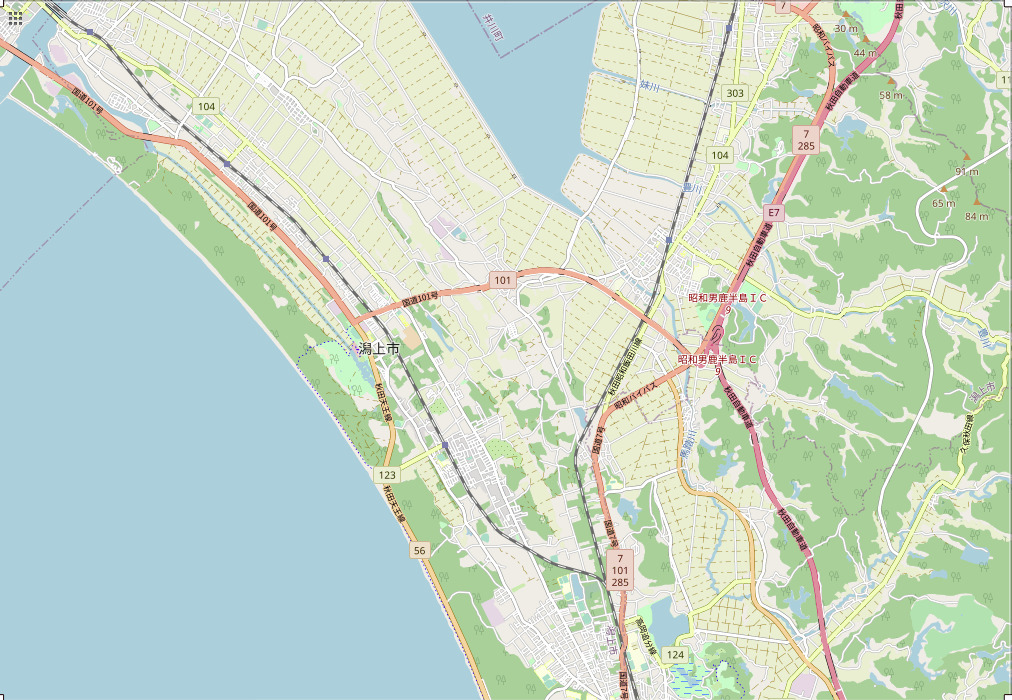
- Location within Katagami, Akita Location within Akita Prefecture Location within Japan

Ugo-Iizuka Station (羽後飯塚駅, Ugo-Iizuka eki) is a railway station in the city of Katagami, Akita, Japan, operated by JR East.

== Lines ==
Ugo-Iizuka Station is served by the Ōu Main Line, and is located 322.2 kilometers from the starting point of the line at Fukushima Station.

== Station layout ==
The station has one side platform and one island platform, serving three tracks, connected to the station building by a footbridge. The station is staffed.

=== Platforms ===
1	■ Ōu Main Line	for Oiwake and Akita
2	■ Ōu Main Line	(passing trains)
3	■ Ōu Main Line	for Higashi-Noshiro and Ōdate

== History ==
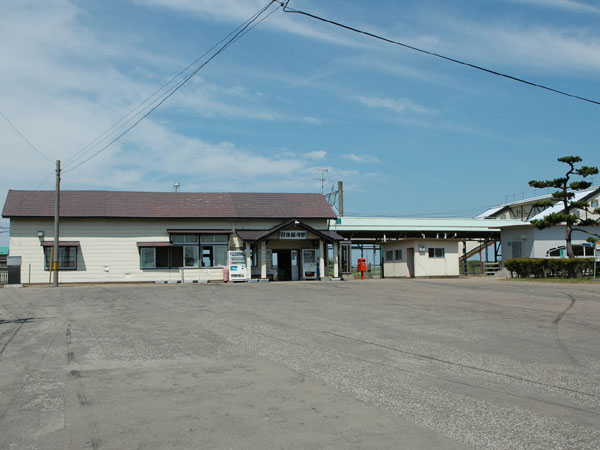
The station in August 2004, before rebuilding

Ugo-Iizuka Station opened on 17 November 1927. With the privatization of Japanese National Railways (JNR) on 1 April 1987, the station came under the control of JR East.

== Passenger statistics ==
In fiscal 2018, the station was used by an average of 106 passengers daily (boarding passengers only).

== Surrounding area ==
- Iidagawa Post Office
- National Route 7
- National Route 285

== See also ==
- List of railway stations in Japan
