= Ikawa-Sakura Station =

Railway station in Ikawa, Akita Prefecture, Japan

Ikawa-Sakura Station 井川さくら駅
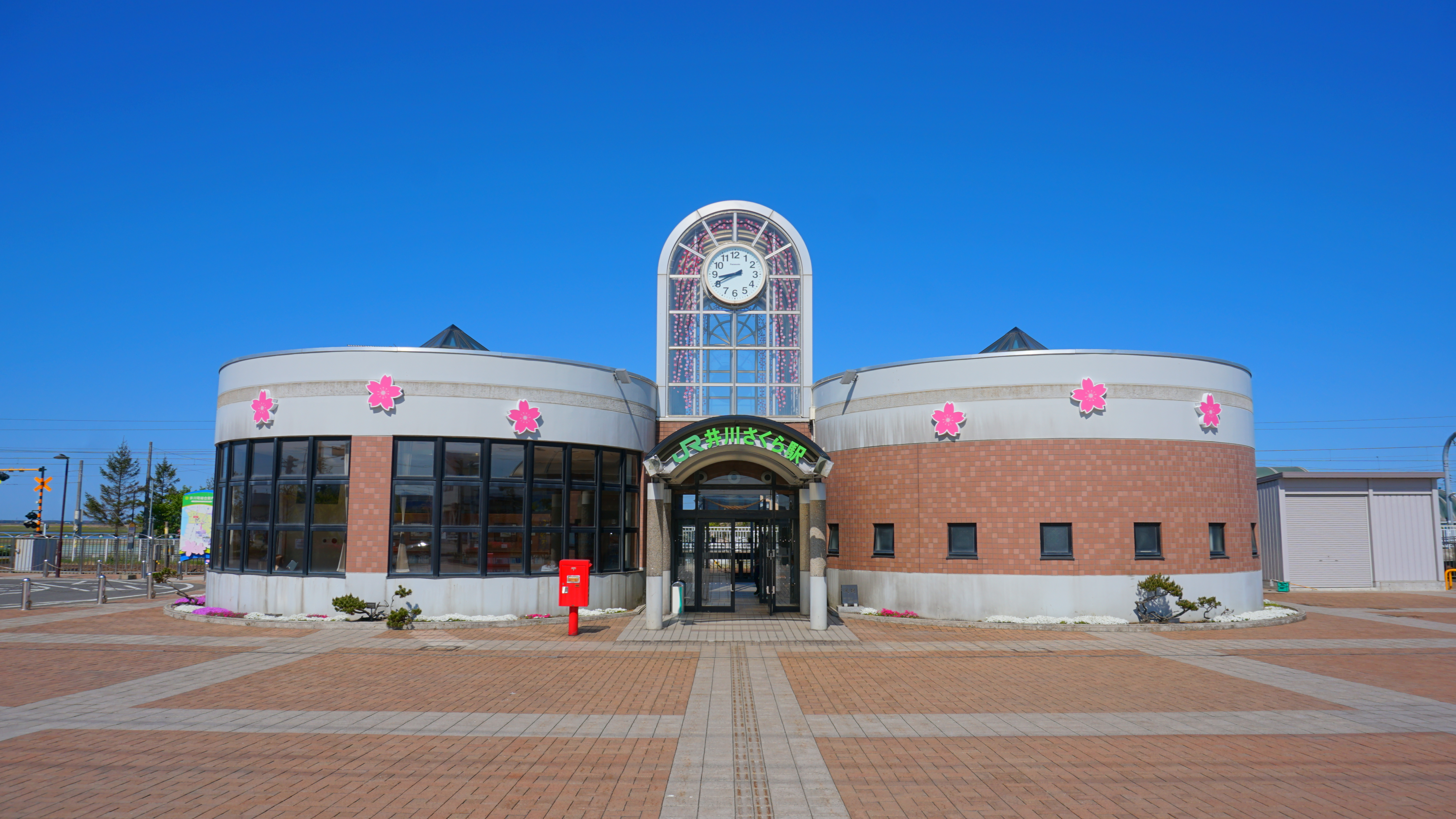
- Ikawa-Sakura Station, May 2019

General information
- Location: 29-1 Shinzeki-29-1 Hamaikawa, Ikawa-cho, Minamiakita-gun, Akita-ken 018-1516; Japan
- Coordinates: 39°54′42.7″N 140°4′33.3″E
- Operator: JR East
- Line: ■ Ōu Main Line
- Distance: 323.6 kilometers from Fukushima
- Platforms: 2 side platforms

Other information
- Status: Staffed
- Website: Official website

History
- Opened: December 1, 1995

Passengers
- FY2018: 277

Services
Preceding station	JR East	Following station
Ugo-Iizuka towards Akita	Ōu Main Line Rapid	Hachirōgata towards Aomori
Ugo-Iizuka towards Shinjō	Ōu Main Line Local	Hachirōgata towards Aomori
Location
- Location within Akita Prefecture Location within Japan

Ikawa-Sakura Station (井川さくら駅, Ikawa-Sakura-eki) is a railway station in the town of Ikawa, Akita Prefecture, Japan, operated by JR East.

== Lines ==
Ikawa-Sakura Station is served by the Ōu Main Line, and is located 323.6 km from the terminus of the line at Fukushima Station.

== Station layout ==
The station consists of two opposed side platform connected to the station building by an underground passageway. The station is staffed. The station building includes a community center, a reading room, and a cafe.

=== Platforms ===
1	■ Ōu Main Line	for Akita and Ōmagari
2	■ Ōu Main Line	for Higashi-Noshiro and Hirosaki

== History ==
Ikawa-Sakura Station opened on December 1, 1995.

== Passenger statistics ==
In fiscal 2018, the station was used by an average of 277 passengers daily (boarding passengers only).

== Surrounding area ==
- Ikawa town office
- Shimoikawa post office
- National Route 7
- National Route 285

== See also ==
- List of railway stations in Japan
