= Ōkubo Station (Akita) =

Railway station in Katagami, Akita Prefecture, Japan

Ōkubo Station 大久保駅
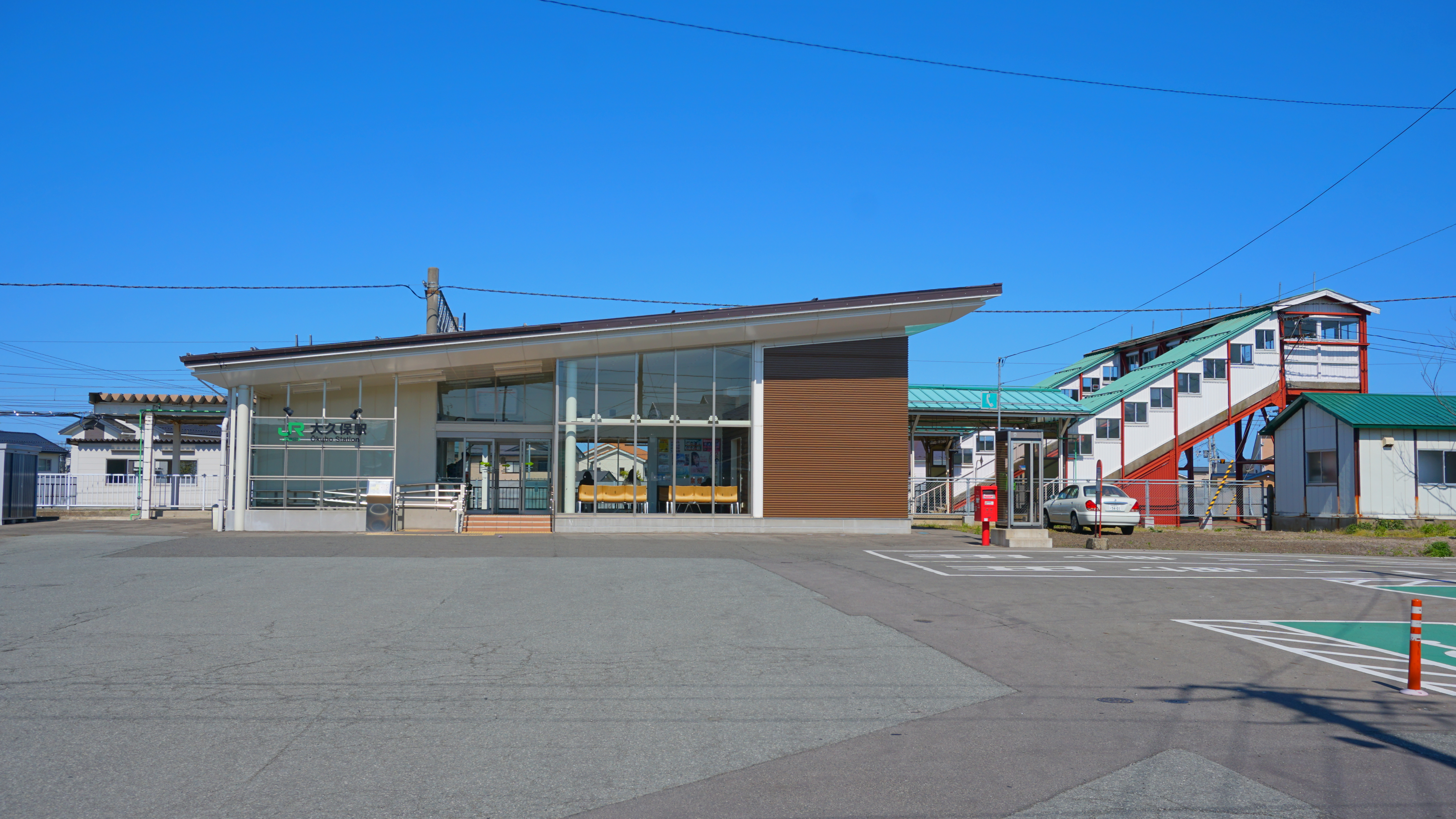
- Ōkubo Station (May 2019)

General information
- Location: 3-1 Kaidōshita, Shōwa-Ōkubo, Katagami-shi, Akita-ken 018-1401; Japan
- Coordinates: 39°52′16.83″N 140°3′47.34″E
- Operator: JR East
- Line: ■ Ōu Main Line
- Distance: 318.9 kilometers from Fukushima
- Platforms: 2 side platforms

Other information
- Status: Staffed
- Website: Official website

History
- Opened: October 21, 1902

Passengers
- FY2018: 400 daily

Services
Preceding station	JR East	Following station
Oiwake towards Akita	Ōu Main Line Rapid	Ugo-Īzuka towards Aomori
Oiwake towards Shinjō	Ōu Main Line Local	Ugo-Īzuka towards Aomori
Location
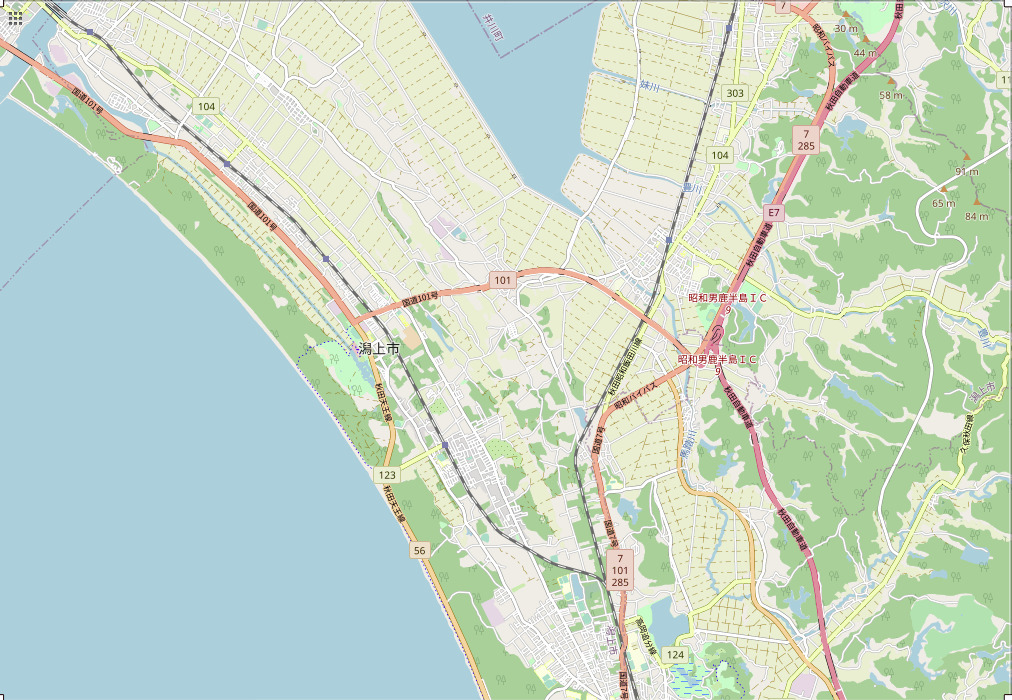
- Location within Katagami, Akita Location within Akita Prefecture Location within Japan

Ōkubo Station (大久保駅, Ōkubo-eki) is a railway station in the city of Katagami, Akita, Japan, operated by East Japan Railway Company (JR East).

== Lines ==
Ōkubo Station is served by the Ōu Main Line, and is located 318.9 km from the terminus of the line at Fukushima Station.

== Station layout ==
Ōkubo Station has one side platform and one island platform serving three tracks, connected by a footbridge. Track 3 is used primarily for freight trains changing direction, so th layout is effectively that of two side platforms. The station is staffed.

=== Platforms ===
1	■ Ōu Main Line	for Oiwake and Akita
2	■ Ōu Main Line	for Higashi-Noshiro and Ōdate
3	■ Ōu Main Line	freight siding

== History ==
Ōkubo Station opened on October 21, 1902. The station was absorbed into the JR East network upon the privatization of JNR on April 1, 1987.

== Passenger statistics ==
In fiscal 2018, the station was used by an average of 400 passengers daily (boarding passengers only).

== Surrounding area ==
- National Route 7
- National Route 101
- Ōkubo Post Office
