= Tennō Station =

Tenno Station is the name of two train stations in Japan:

- Tennō Station (Akita) (天王駅)
- Tennō Station (Hiroshima) (天応駅)

== See also ==
- Tenino station, Washington, U.S.A.
