= Katagami =

Katagami 潟上市
- City
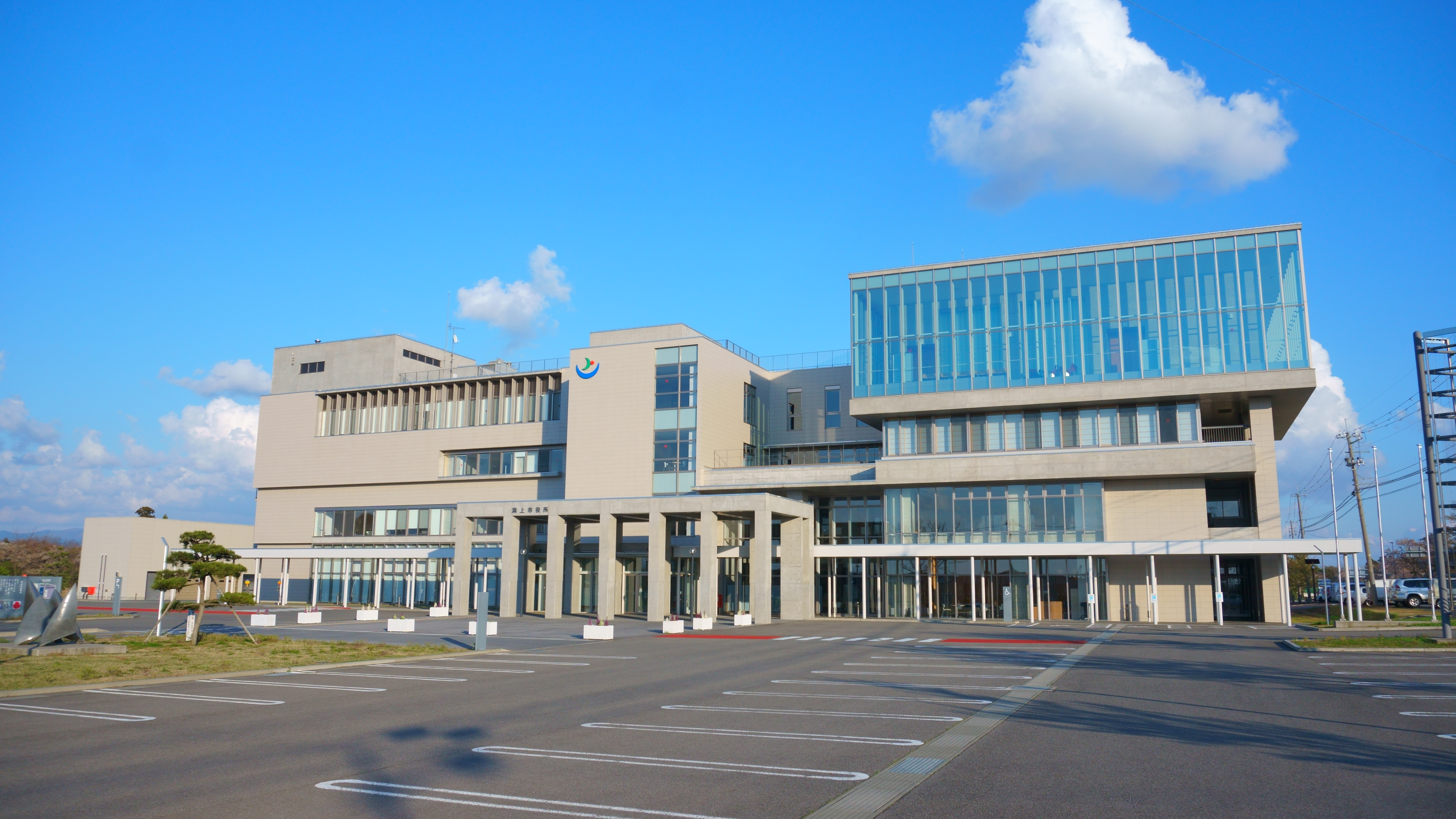
- Katagami City Hall

- Flag Seal
- Interactive map of Katagami
- Coordinates: 39°51′37″N 140°00′40″E
- Country: Japan
- Region: Tōhoku
- Prefecture: Akita

Area
  - Total: 97.72 km^{2} (37.73 sq mi)

Population (February 28, 2023)
  - Total: 31,775
  - Density: 325.2/km^{2} (842.2/sq mi)
- Time zone: UTC+9 (Japan Standard Time)
- Phone number: 018-878-2211
- Address: 47-100 Kami-egawa, Tennō, Katagami-shi, Akita-ken 010-0201
- Website: Official website
- Symbols
- Bird: Heron
- Flower: Rose
- Tree: Japanese black pine

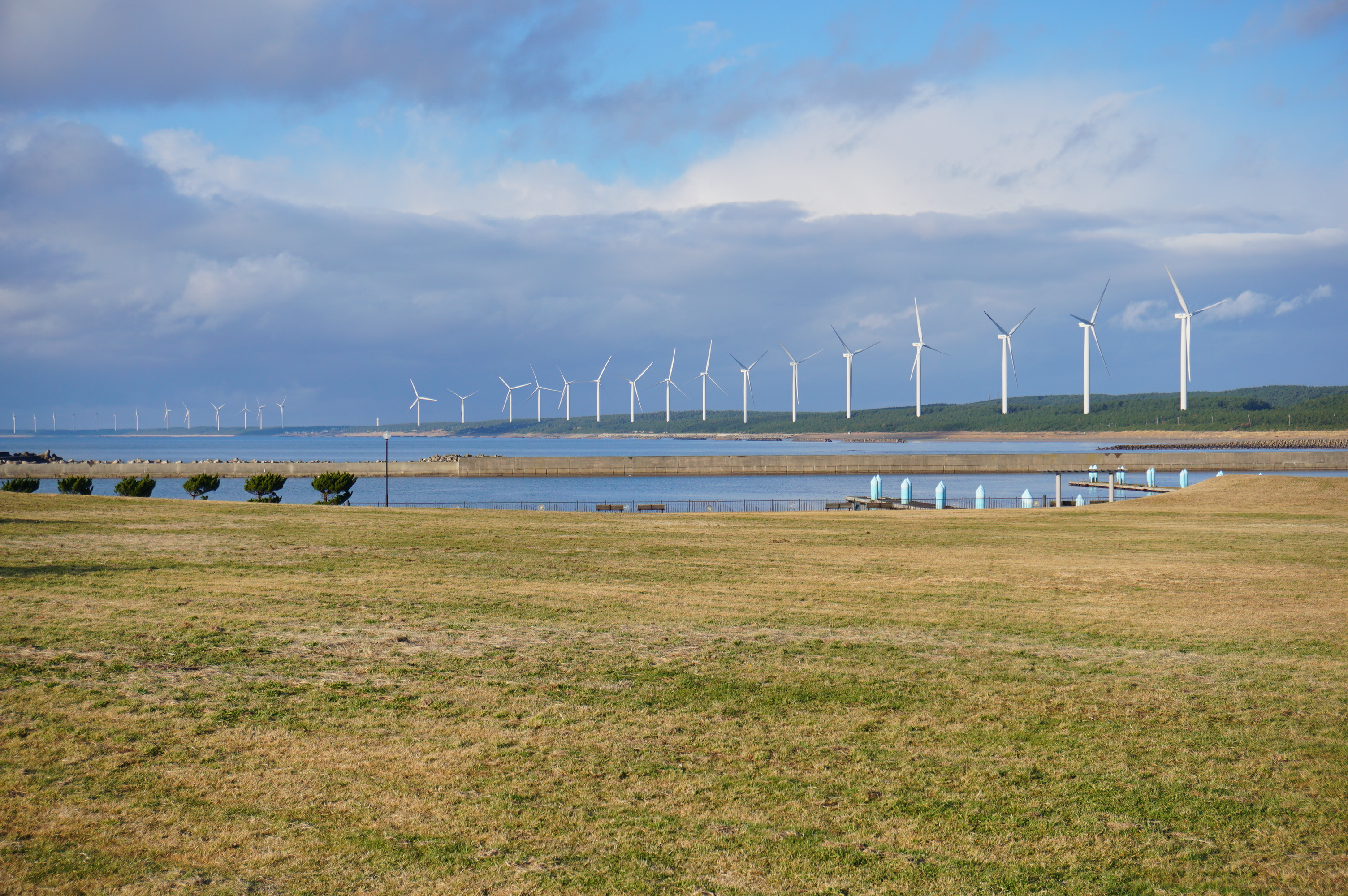
Wind turbines lined up along the coast of Katagami City

Katagami (潟上市, Katagami-shi) is a city located in Akita Prefecture, Japan. As of 28 February 2023, the city had an estimated population of 31,775 in 14162 households, and a population density of 330 persons per km². The total area of the city is 97.72 square kilometres (37.73 sq mi).

== Geography ==
Katagami is located in the coastal plains of northwestern Akita Prefecture, with the Sea of Japan on the southwest and the remnant of Lake Hachirōgata to the northwest, bordering Ikawa Town to the east, Akita City to the south, Oga City to the west, and Ogata Village across Lake Hachiro to the north. It has the smallest area of any city in Akita Prefecture.

The eastern part of the city has many small hills, whilst the central and northern parts are fertile countryside, and the western part contains three leading sand dunes.

=== Neighboring municipalities ===
Akita Prefecture

- Akita
- Gojōme
- Ikawa
- Oga
- Ōgata

== Climate ==
Katagami has a humid subtropical climate (Köppen climate classification Cfa) with large seasonal temperature differences, with warm to hot (and often humid) summers and cold (sometimes severely cold) winters. Precipitation is significant throughout the year, but is heaviest from August to October. The average annual temperature in Katagami is 11.2 °C. The average annual rainfall is 1631 mm with September as the wettest month. The temperatures are highest on average in August, at around 24.9 °C, and lowest in January, at around -0.8 °C.

== Demographics ==
Per Japanese census data, the population of Katakami has been relatively steady over the past 70 years.

Historical population
Year	Pop.	±% p.a.
1950	28,272	—
1960	28,338	+0.02%
1970	28,678	+0.12%
1980	32,895	+1.38%
1990	33,470	+0.17%
2000	35,711	+0.65%
2010	34,443	−0.36%
2020	31,720	−0.82%

== History ==
The area of present-day Katagami was part of ancient Dewa Province. During the Edo period, the area came under the control of the Satake clan, who ruled the northern third of the province from Kubota Domain. After the start of the Meiji period, the area became part of Minamiakita District, Akita Prefecture in 1878 with the establishment of the modern municipalities system.

The city of Katagami was established on March 22, 2005, from the merger of the three towns of Iitagawa, Shōwa and Tennō (all from Minamiakita District). The "kata" in "katakami" refers to Hachirogata Lagoon.

The city badge has a red circle and green arc depicting people, with the blue and green arcs depicting Lake Hachiro.

== Government ==
Katagami has a mayor-council form of government with a directly elected mayor and a unicameral city legislature of 18 members. The city contributes one member to the Akita Prefectural Assembly. In terms of national politics, the city is part of Akita 2nd District of the lower house of the Diet of Japan.

== Economy ==
The economy of Katagami is based on agriculture and commercial fishing.

== Education ==
Katagami has six public elementary schools and three public middle schools operated by the city government and one public high school operated by the Akita Prefectural Board of Education. The prefecture also operates one special education school for the handicapped.

== Transportation ==
=== Railway ===
East Japan Railway Company - Ōu Main Line

- Ōkubo - Ugo-Iizuka

East Japan Railway Company - Oga Line

- Detohama - Kamifutada - Futada - Tennō

=== Highways ===
- Akita Expressway
- National Route 7
- National Route 101

== Noted people from Katagami ==
- Koji Futada, politician
- Koya Handa, professional soccer player
- Suguru Ito, professional soccer player
- Kenichi Kaga, professional soccer player
- Yuki Kikuchi, basketball player
- Ikuo Nakamura, photographer
- Kazushi Sakuraba, mixed martial artist
- Kenichi Takahashi (basketball), basketball player
- Kōsei Yoshida, professional baseball player
