= Hachirōgata Station =

Railway station in Hachirōgata, Akita Prefecture, Japan

Hachirōgata Station 八郎潟駅
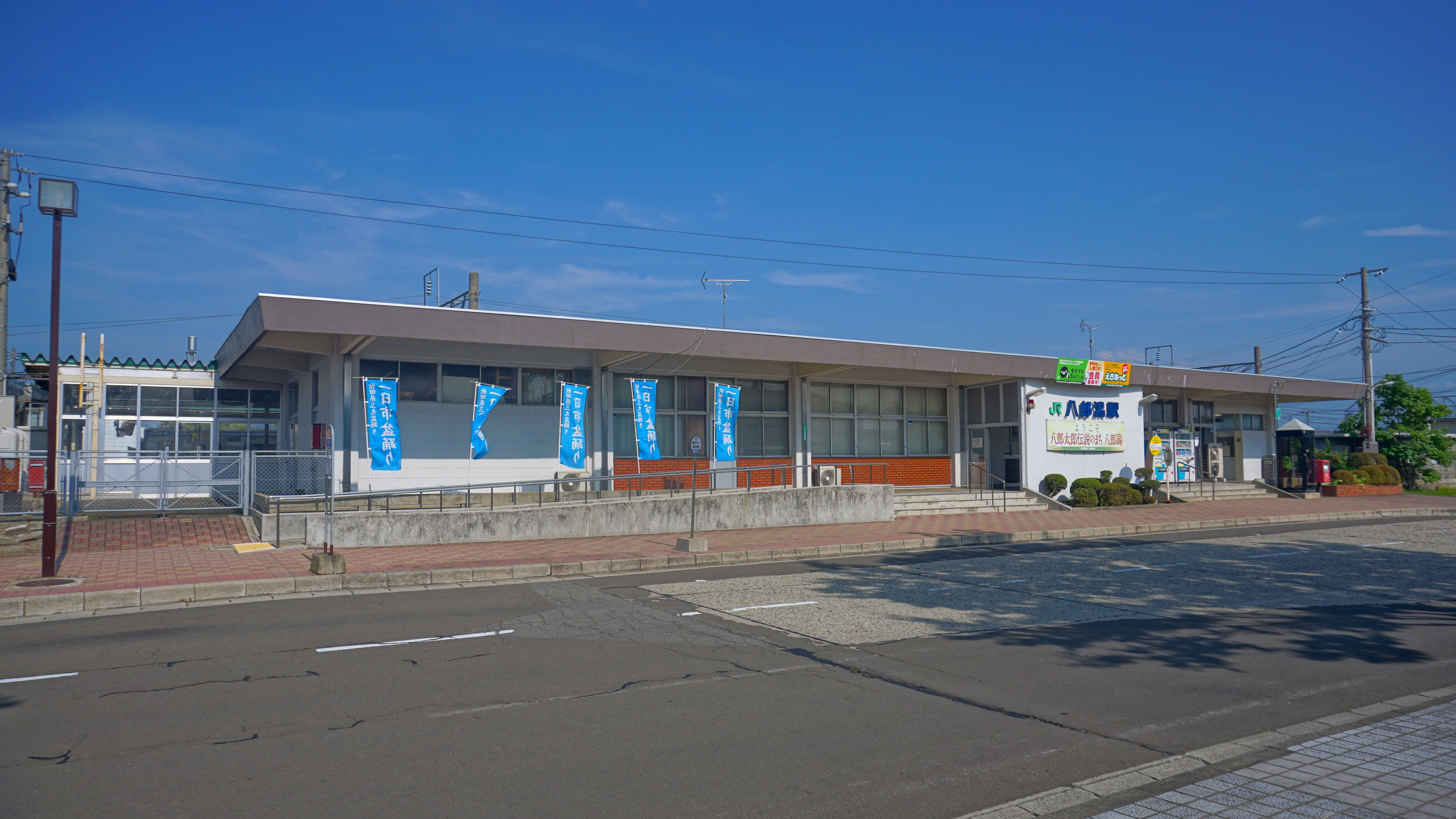
- Hachirōgata Station (August 2019)

General information
- Location: 85-2 Azanakata Hachirogata-cho, Minamiakita-gun, Akita-ken 018-1614; Japan
- Coordinates: 39°56′50.6″N 140°4′42.24″E
- Operator: JR East
- Line: ■ Ōu Main Line
- Distance: 327.5 kilometers from Fukushima
- Platforms: 1 side + 1 island platform

Other information
- Status: Staffed
- Website: Official website

History
- Opened: June 15, 1905
- Former names: Gojome; Hitoichi (until 1965)

Passengers
- FY2018: 792

Services
Preceding station	JR East	Following station
Akita Terminus	Tsugaru	Moritake towards Aomori
Ikawa-Sakura towards Akita	Ōu Main Line Rapid	Moritake towards Aomori
Ikawa-Sakura towards Shinjō	Ōu Main Line Local	Koikawa towards Aomori
Location
- Location within Akita Prefecture Location within Japan

Hachirōgata Station (八郎潟駅, Hachirōgata-eki) is a railway station in the town of Hachirōgata, Akita Prefecture, Japan, operated by JR East.

== Lines ==
Hachirōgata Station is served by the Ōu Main Line, and is located 327.5 km from the terminus of the line at Fukushima Station.

== Station layout ==
The station consists of one side platform and one island platform connected to the station building by a footbridge. The station is staffed.

=== Platforms ===
1	■ Ōu Main Line	for Higashi-Noshiro and Hirosaki
2, 3	■ Ōu Main Line	for Akita and Ōmagari

== History ==
Hachirōgata Station opened on August 1, 1902 as Gojome Station (五城目駅) on the Japanese Government Railways (JGR). It was renamed Hitoichi Station (一日市駅) on November 1, 1921. The station was renamed to its present name on June 1, 1965, and a new station building was completed in December of the same year. The station was absorbed into the JR East network upon the privatization of JNR on April 1, 1987.

== Passenger statistics ==
In fiscal 2018, the station was used by an average of 792 passengers daily (boarding passengers only).

== Surrounding area ==
- Hachirōgata town office
- Hachirōgata post office
- National Route 7

== See also ==
- List of railway stations in Japan
