= Ikawa, Akita =

Ikawa 井川町
- Town
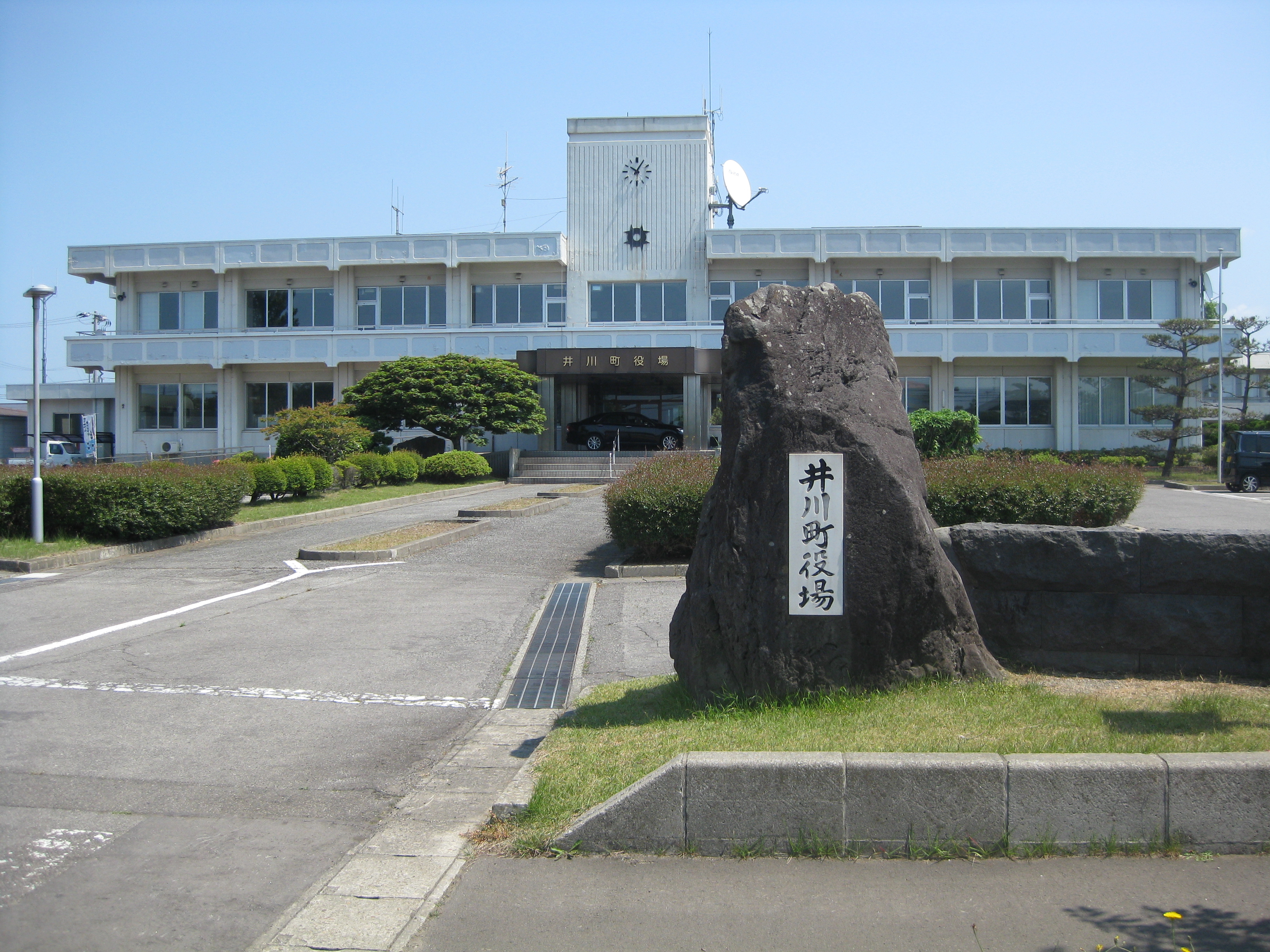
- Ikawa Town Hall

- Flag Seal
- Interactive map of Ikawa
- Coordinates: 39°54′51″N 140°4′54″E
- Country: Japan
- Region: Tōhoku
- Prefecture: Akita
- District: Minamiakita

Area
  - Total: 47.95 km^{2} (18.51 sq mi)

Population (March 1, 2023)
  - Total: 4,360
  - Density: 90.9/km^{2} (236/sq mi)
- Time zone: UTC+9 (Japan Standard Time)
- Address: Kita-Kawajiri-aze, Ikawa-machi, Minamiakita-gun, Akita-ken 018-1596
- Website: Official website
- Symbols
- Bird: Copper pheasant
- Flower: Sakura

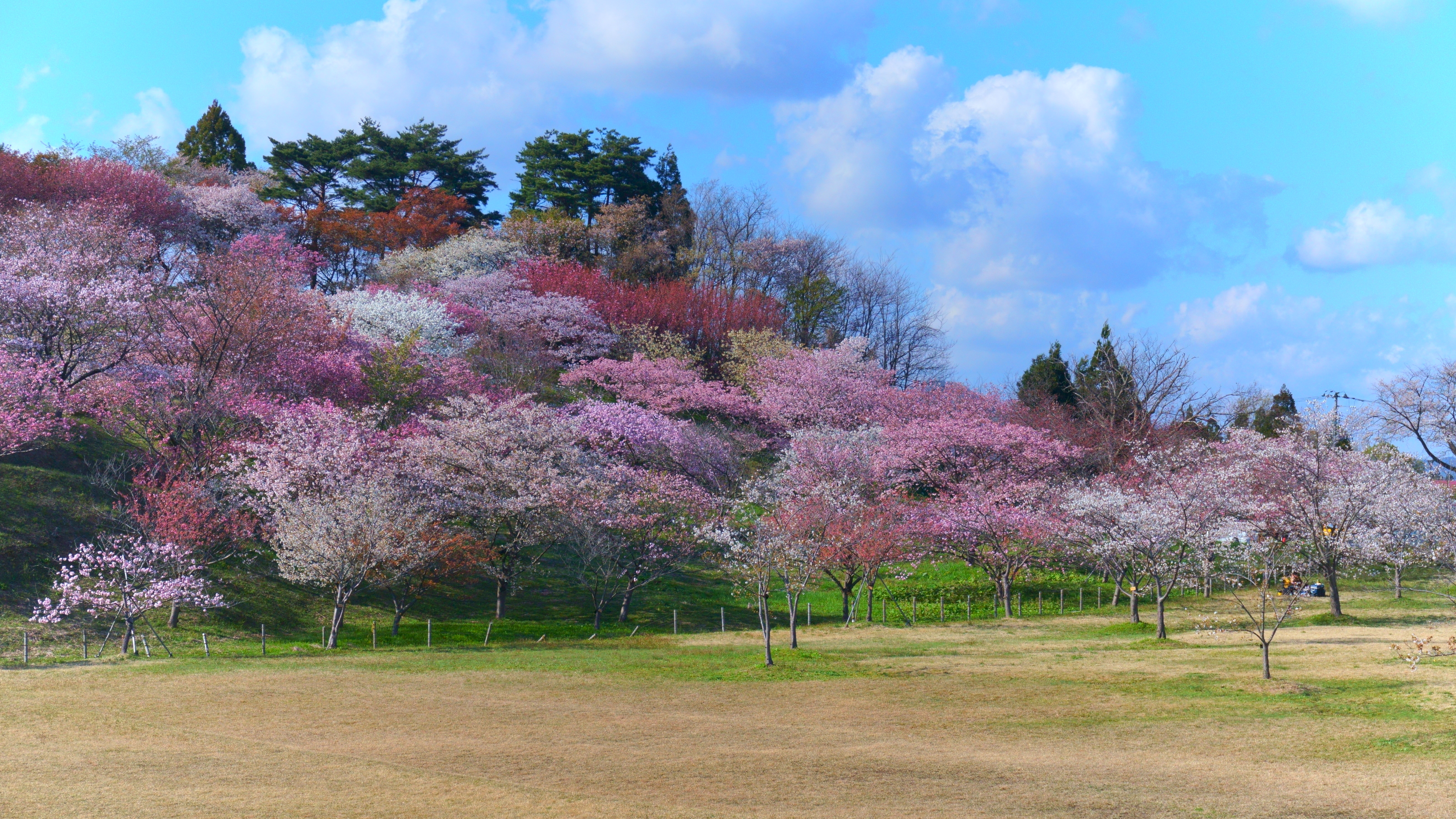
Scenery of Nihon Kokkaen

Ikawa (井川町, Ikawa-machi) is a town located in Akita, Japan. As of 1 March 2023, the town had an estimated population of 4658 in 1740 households and a population density of 91 persons per km^{2}. The total area of the town was 47.95 square kilometres (18.51 sq mi).

== Geography ==
Ikawa is located in the coastal flatlands of northeastern Akita Prefecture, bordered by the remnant of Lake Hachirōgata which lies in the west of the town. Lake Hachirōgata was the second largest lake in Japan until it was drained in a land reclamation project from 1957 to 1977.

=== Neighboring municipalities ===
Akita Prefecture

- Akita
- Gojōme
- Hachirōgata
- Katagami
- Ōgata

== Climate ==
Ikawa has a humid continental climate (Köppen climate classification Cfa) with large seasonal temperature differences, with warm to hot (and often humid) summers and cold (sometimes severely cold) winters. Precipitation is significant throughout the year, but is heaviest from August to October. The average annual temperature in Ikawa is 11.1 °C. The average annual rainfall is 1612 mm with September as the wettest month. The temperatures are highest on average in August, at around 24.8 °C, and lowest in January, at around -1.0 °C.

== Demographics ==
Per Japanese census data, the population of Ikawa peaked at around the year 1960 and has been in steady decline since then.

Historical population

Year	Pop.	±% p.a.
1920	5,455	—
1930	5,849	+0.70%
1940	6,254	+0.67%
1950	7,631	+2.01%
1960	7,611	−0.03%

Year	Pop.	±% p.a.
1970	6,669	−1.31%
1980	6,380	−0.44%
1990	6,294	−0.14%
2000	6,116	−0.29%
2010	5,495	−1.06%

== History ==
The area of present-day Ikawa was part of ancient Dewa Province, dominated by the Satake clan during the Edo period, who ruled Kubota Domain under the Tokugawa shogunate. The villages of Kami-Ikawa and Shimo-Ikawa were established on April 1, 1889, with the establishment of the modern municipalities system, and were merged to form Ikawa Village on February 1, 1955. The village was raised to town status on June 1, 1974. Efforts to merge the town with neighboring Hachirōgata and Gojōme in 2005 were not successful.

== Government ==
Ikawa has a mayor-council form of government with a directly elected mayor and a unicameral town council of 12 members. Ikawa, together the other municipalities of Minamiakita District contributes one member to the Akita Prefectural Assembly. In terms of national politics, the town is part of Akita 2nd district of the lower house of the Diet of Japan.

== Economy ==
The economy of Ikawa is based on agriculture.

== Education ==
Ikawa has one combined public elementary/middle schools operated by the town government. The town does not have a high school.

== Transportation ==
=== Railway ===
East Japan Railway Company - Ōu Main Line

- Ikawa-Sakura

=== Highway ===
- National Route 7
- National Route 285

== Noted people from Ikawa ==
- Hananoumi Ken, sumo wrestler (Real Name: Ken Sawaishi, Nihongo: 沢石健, Sawaishi Ken)
