= Oga Line =

Rural railway line in Japan

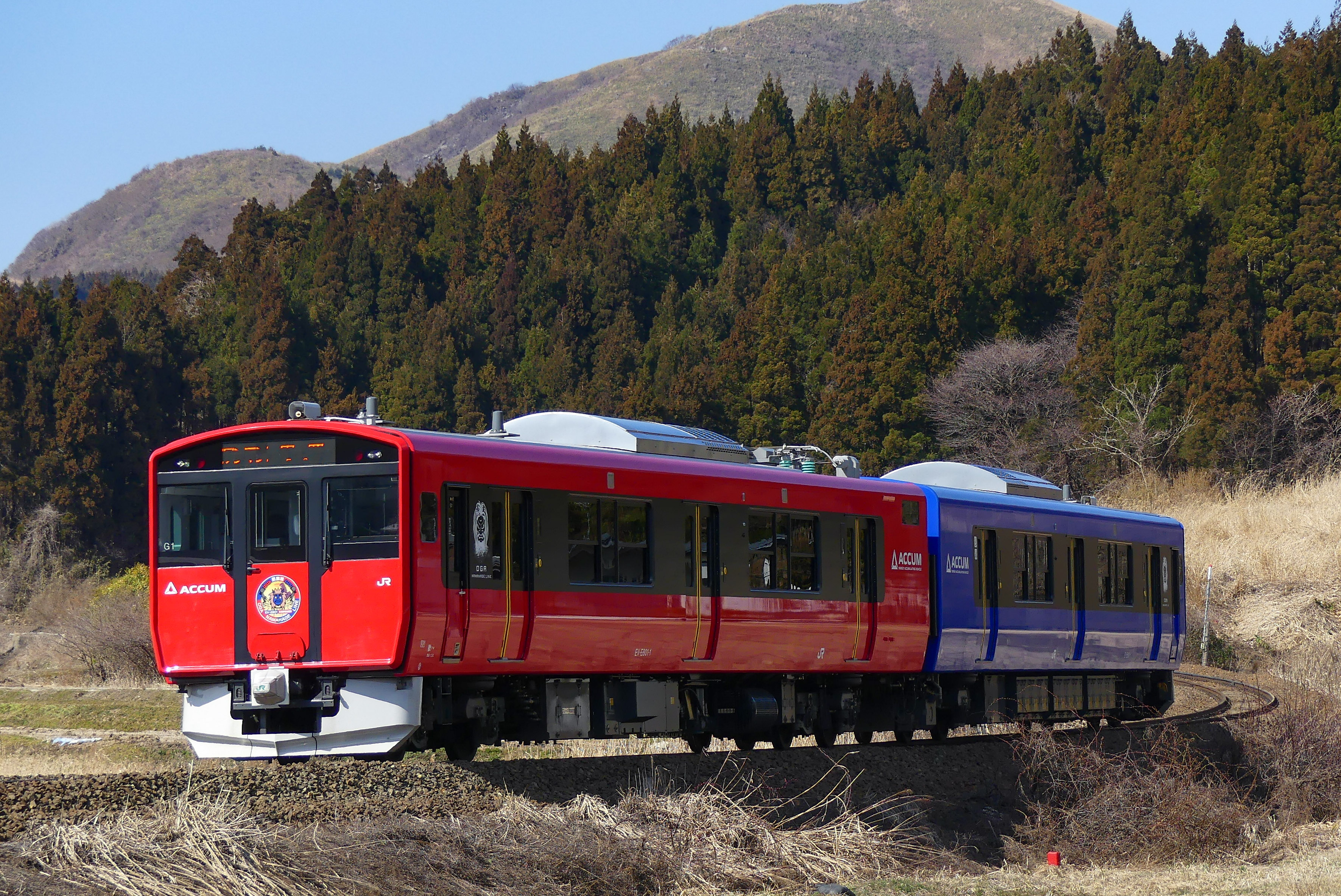
- An Oga Line EV-E801 series in April 2017

Overview
- Other name: Oga Namahage Line
- Native name: 男鹿線
- Status: In operation
- Owner: JR East
- Locale: Akita Prefecture
- Termini: Oiwake; Oga
- Stations: 9

Service
- Operator: JR East
- Rolling stock: EV-E801 series BEMU

History
- Opened: 9 November 1913; 113 years ago

Technical
- Line length: 26.4 km (16.4 mi)
- Num of tracks: Entire line single tracked
- Character: Rural
- Track gauge: 1,067 mm (3 ft 6 in)
- Electrification: None
- Operating speed: 85 km/h (53 mph)

The Oga Line (男鹿線, Oga-sen) is a railway line in Japan operated by East Japan Railway Company (JR East). It connects Oiwake Station in Akita, Akita Prefecture to Oga Station in Oga, Akita Prefecture, although all trains begin and end at Akita Station and run via through service onto the Ōu Main Line. It is nicknamed the Oga Namahage Line (男鹿なまはげライン).

== Stations ==
All stations are in Akita Prefecture.

Station	Japanese name	Distance (km)	Transfers	Location
All trains have through service and run to/from Akita Station via the Ōu Main Line.
Oiwake	追分	0.0	■ Ōu Main Line	Akita
Detohama	出戸浜	5.1		Katagami
Kamifutada	上二田	8.3		Katagami
Futada	二田	10.4		Katagami
Tennō	天王	13.2		Katagami
Funakoshi	船越	14.9		Oga
Wakimoto	脇本	18.9		Oga
Hadachi	羽立	23.7		Oga
Oga	男鹿	26.4		Oga

== Rolling stock ==
=== Current ===
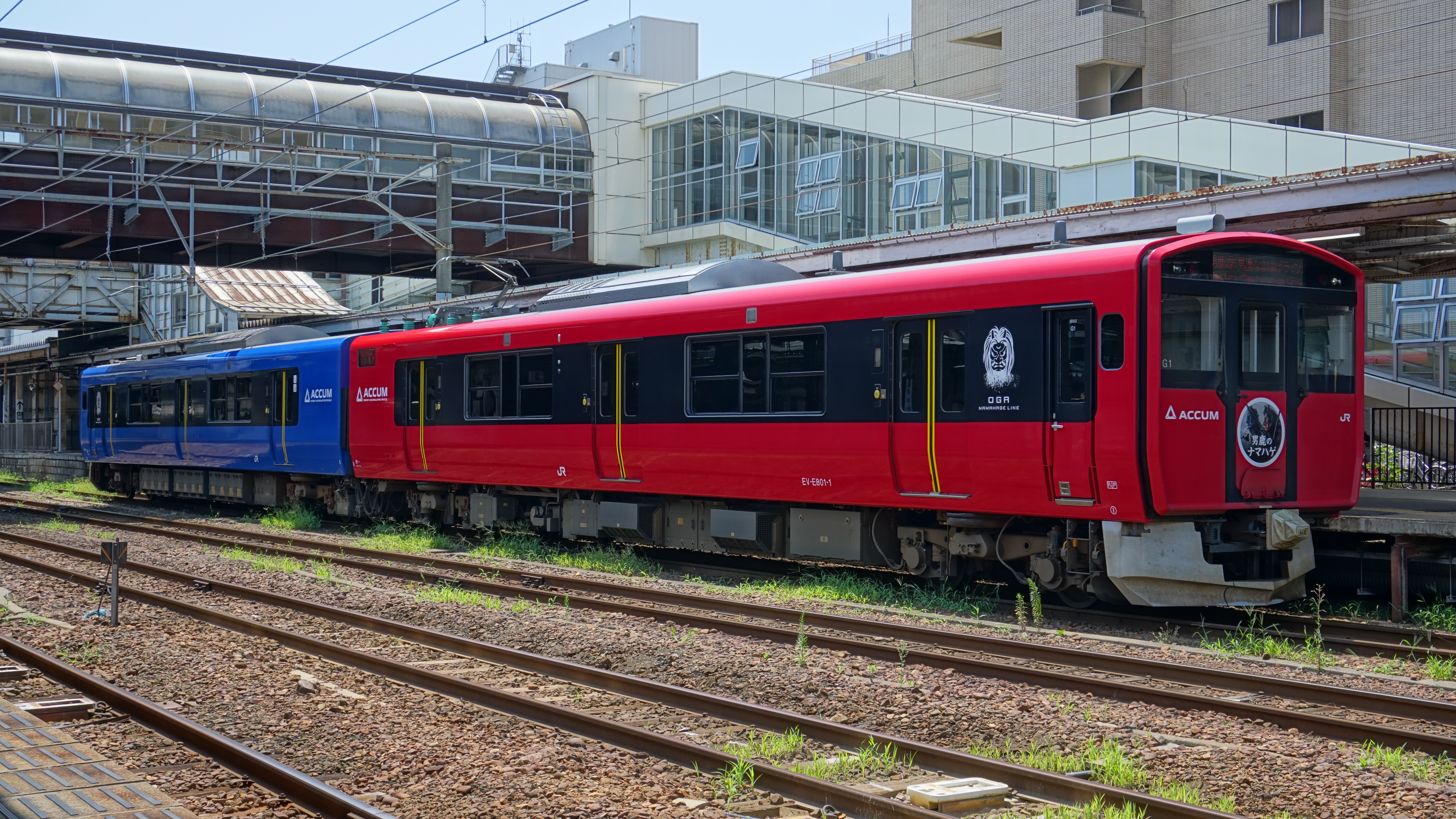
An EV-E801 series in August 2019

- EV-E801 series (since March 4, 2017)

=== Former ===
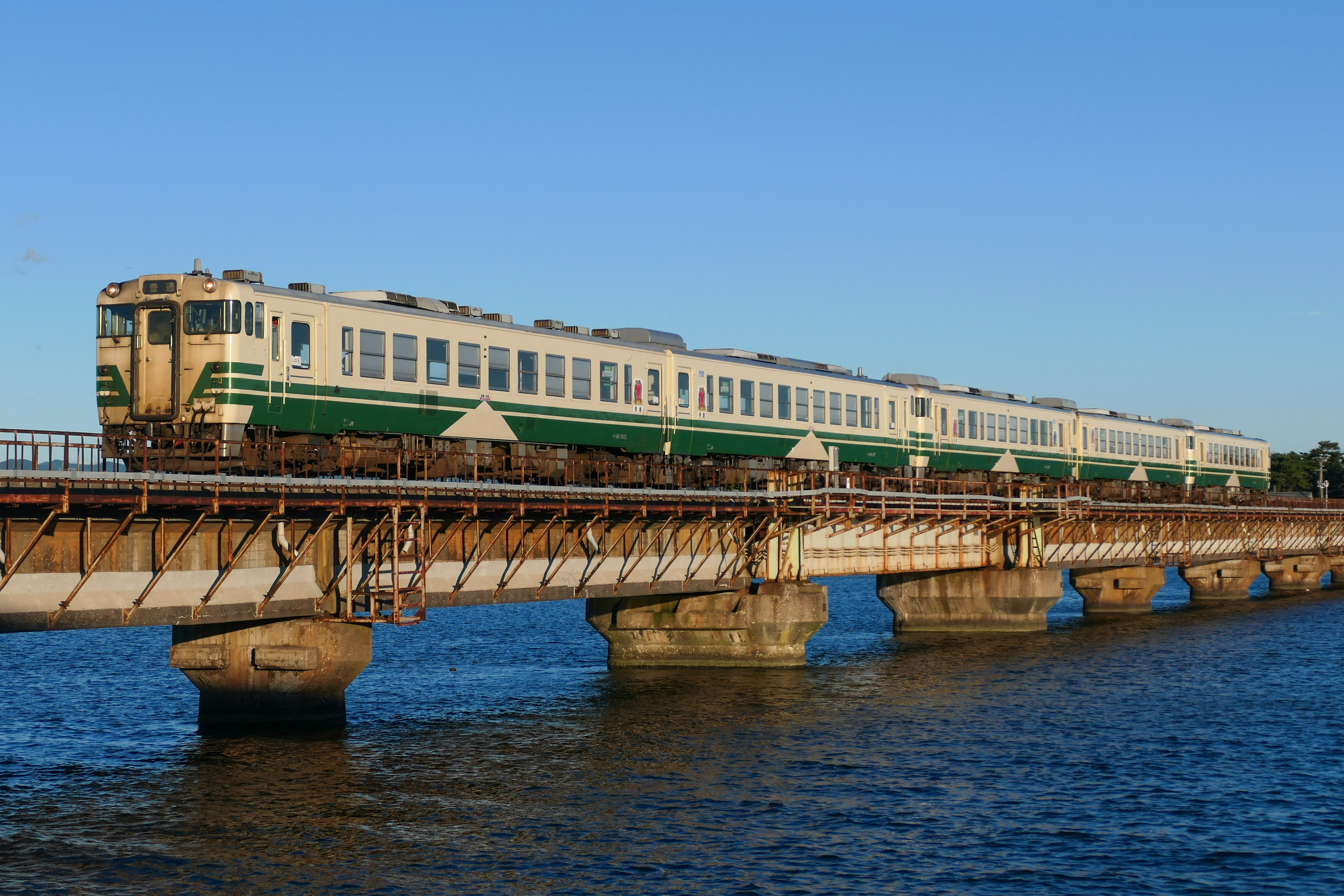
A 5-car KiHa 40 series DMU formation in September 2020

- KiHa 40 series (prior to March 13, 2021)

== History ==
The line first opened on 9 November 1913 as the Funakawa Light Railway (船川軽便線, Funakawa Keiben) from Oiwake to Futada. This was extended to Wakimoto on 8 November 1914, to Hadachi on 1 December 1915, and to Funakawa (present-day Oga Station) on 16 December 1916. On 2 September 1922, the line was renamed the Funakawa Line (船川線, Funakawa-sen).

A freight-only branch from Funakawa to Funakawaminato was opened on 10 June 1937.

On 1 April 1968, the line was renamed the Oga Line, coinciding with the renaming of Funakawa Station to Oga Station.

With the privatization of Japanese National Railways (JNR) on 1 April 1987, the line came under the control of JR East.

== Recent developments ==
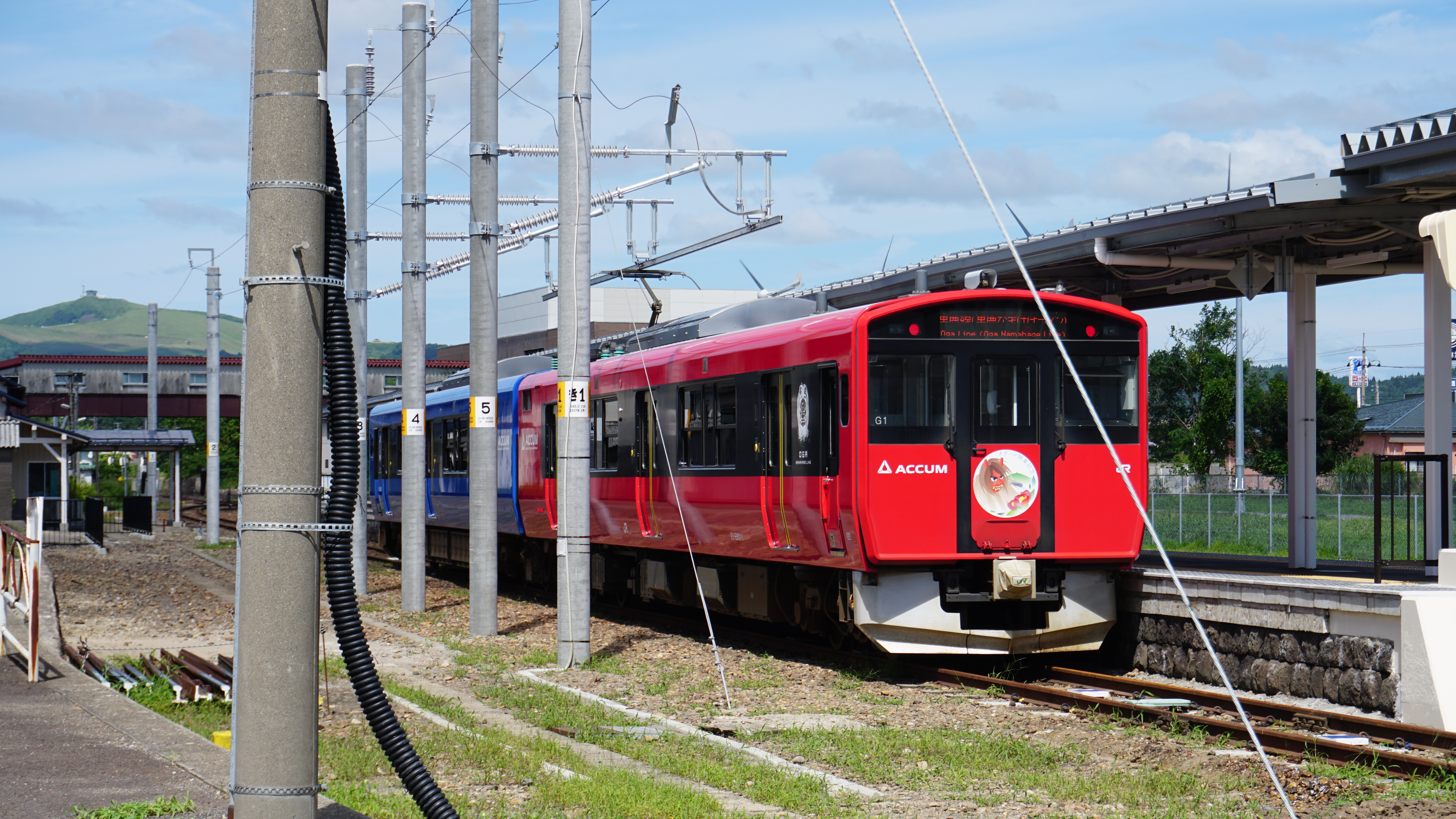
EV-E801 recharging at Oga Station from an overhead conductor bar

In spring 2017, a new EV-E801 series battery electric multiple unit train was introduced on the Oga Line service from Akita. A special recharging facility was built at Oga Station.

So far, there is only one battery electric trainset operated on this line, but in December 2019 JR East announced the plan to introduce additional such trainsets on this route after the fiscal year 2020, completely replacing KiHa 40 and 48 diesel multiple units.

JR East ordered 5 additional trainsets, and as of March 2021, Oga Line service consists of only battery electric trains; this has already happened in other non-electrified railway lines in Japan, for example, on the Kashii Line and the Karasuyama Line.
