= Oga Station =

Railway station in Oga, Akita Prefecture, Japan

Oga Station 男鹿駅
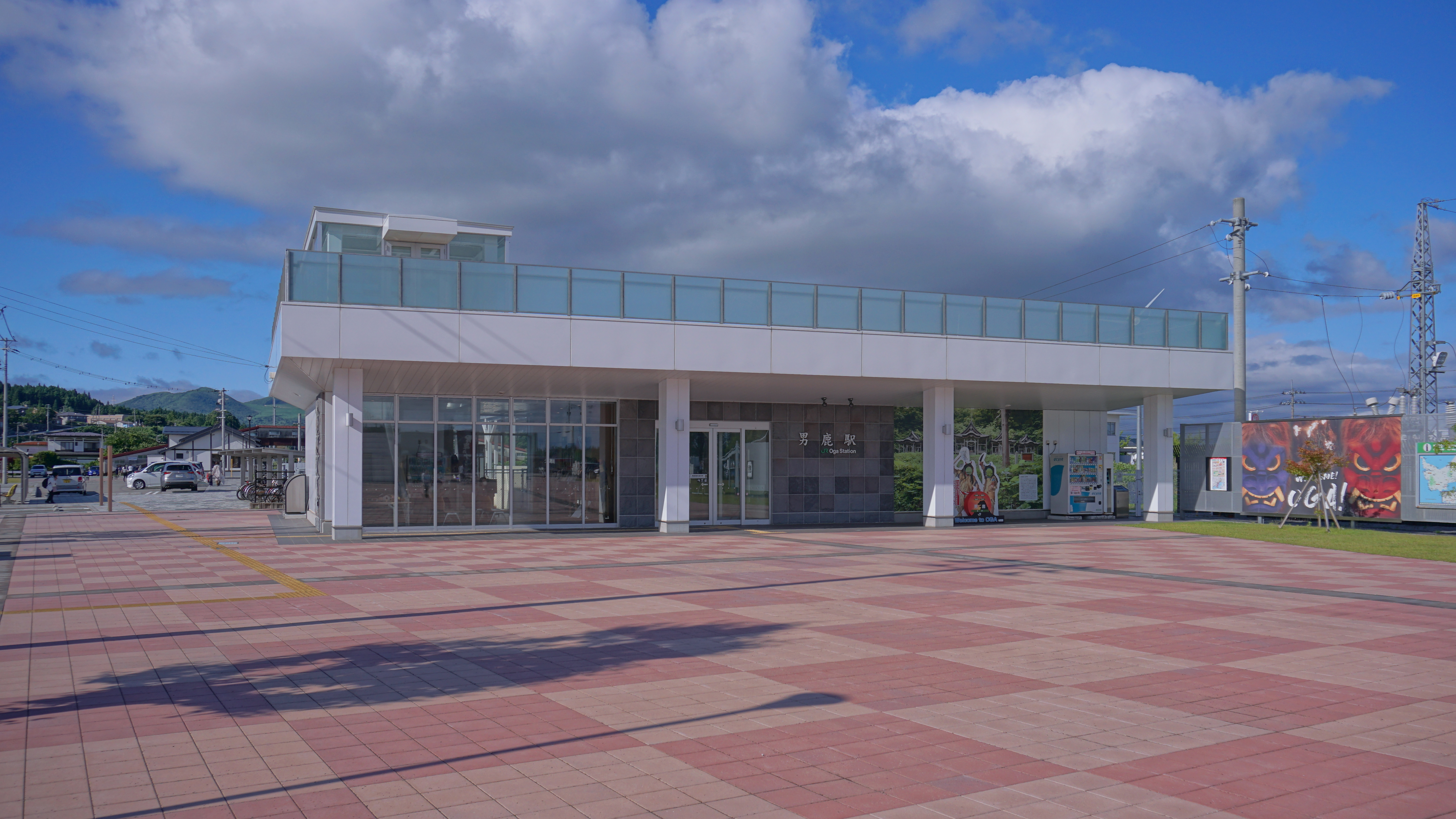
- Oga Station (June 2023)

General information
- Location: Shinhamachō-1 Funagawaminato Funagawa, Oga-shi, Akita-ken 010-0511; Japan
- Coordinates: 39°53′6.2″N 139°50′55.1″E
- Operator: JR East
- Line: ■ Oga Line
- Distance: 26.6 kilometers from Oiwake
- Platforms: 1 island platform

Other information
- Status: Staffed
- Website: Official website

History
- Opened: December 16, 1916
- Former names: Funakawa (until 1968)

Passengers
- FY2019: 352

Services
Preceding station	JR East	Following station
Hadachi towards Akita	Oga Line	Terminus
Location
- Location within Akita Prefecture Location within Japan

Oga Station (男鹿駅, Oga-eki) is a railway station in the city of Oga, Akita Prefecture, Japan, operated by East Japan Railway Company (JR East).

== Lines ==
Oga Station is a terminus of the Oga Line and is located 26.6 rail kilometers from the opposing terminal of the line at Oiwake .

== Station layout ==
The staffed station has a single island platform, with the station building at the tail end (south) of the platform.

=== Platforms ===
1-2	■ Oga Line	for Oiwake and Akita

== History ==
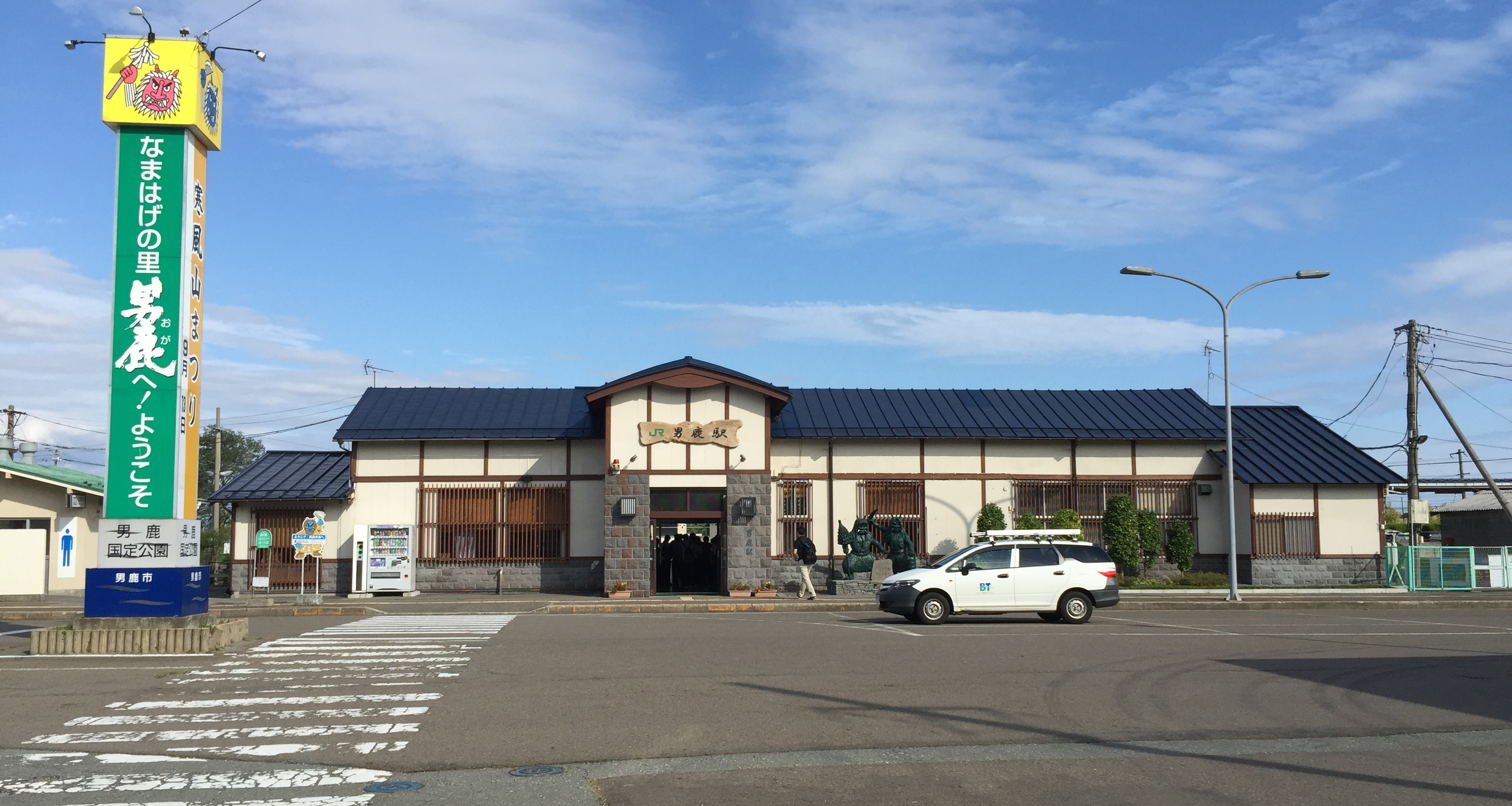
Former station building (28 August 2015)

Japanese National Railways opened Oga Station on December 16, 1916 as Funakawa Station (船川駅), serving the town of Funakawamianto, Akita. It was renamed to its present name on April 1, 1968. The station was transferred to JR East after privatization of the JNR. The station building was renovated in 2012, including installation of Namahage statues. The station building was replaced with a new one 100 meters south in 2018 to support tourism and environmental initiatives.

== Passenger statistics ==
In fiscal year 2019, the station was used by an average of 352 passengers daily (boarding passengers only).

== Surrounding area ==
- Oga City Hall
- Oga Post Office

== See also ==
- List of railway stations in Japan
