= Oiwake Station (Akita) =

Railway station in Akita, Akita Prefecture, Japan

Oiwake Station 追分駅
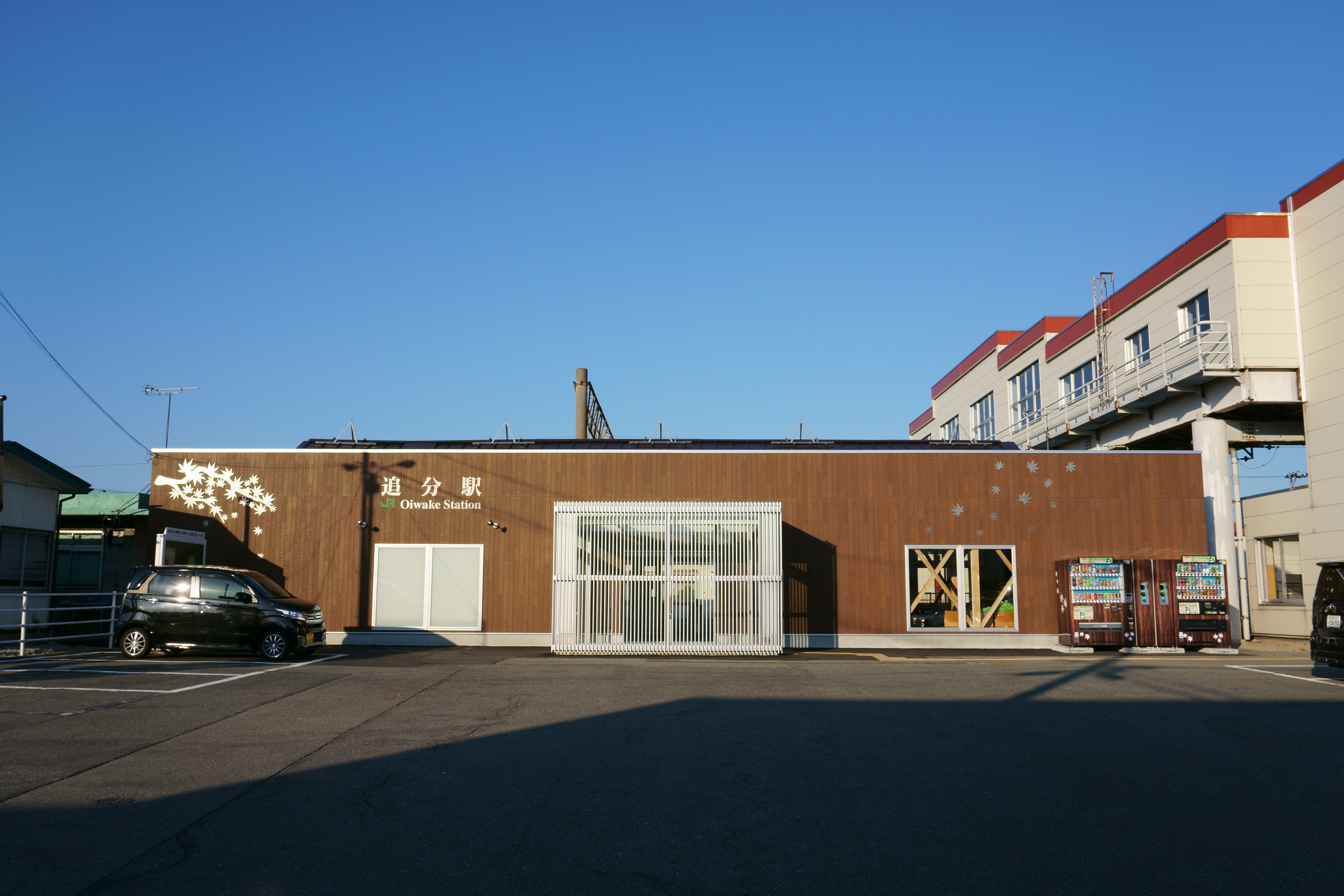
- Oiwake Station (May 20, 2018)

General information
- Location: 257-4 Ebiana, Kanaashi-oiwake, Akita-shi, Akita-ken, 010-0126; Japan
- Coordinates: 39.80995°N 140.057745°E
- Operator: JR East
- Lines: ■ Ōu Main Line; ■ Oga Line
- Distance: 311.7 kilometers from Fukushima
- Platforms: 1 side + 1 island platform

Other information
- Status: Staffed
- Website: Official website

History
- Opened: October 21, 1902

Passengers
- FY2018: 1653 daily

Services
Preceding station	JR East	Following station
Kami-Iijima towards Akita	Ōu Main Line Rapid	Ōkubo towards Aomori
Kami-Iijima towards Shinjō	Ōu Main Line Local	Ōkubo towards Aomori
Kami-Iijima towards Akita	Oga Line	Detohama towards Oga
Location
- Location within Akita Prefecture Location within Japan

Oiwake Station (追分駅, Oiwake-eki) is a junction railway station in the city of Akita, Akita Prefecture, Japan, operated by East Japan Railway Company (JR East).

== Lines ==
Oiwake Station is served by the Ōu Main Line, and is located 311.7 km from the starting point of the line at Fukushima Station. It is also the southern terminus of the Oga Line and is 26.6 kilometers from the opposing terminus of the line at Oga.

== Station layout ==
The station has a single side platform and an island platform connected to the station building by a footbridge. The station is staffed.

=== Platforms ===
1	■ Oga Line	for Akita; For Oga
2	■ Oga Line	for Oga
2	■ Ōu Main Line	for Higashi-Noshiro and Hirosaki
3	■ Ōu Main Line	for Akita and Ōmagari

== History ==
Oiwake Station opened on October 21, 1902 as a station on the Japanese Government Railways (JGR). JGR became the Japanese National Railways (JNR) after World War II. The station was absorbed into the JR East network upon the privatization of JNR on April 1, 1987.

== Passenger statistics ==
In fiscal 2018, the station was used by an average of 1653 passengers daily (boarding passengers only).

== Surrounding area ==
- National Route 7
- Oiwake Post Office

== See also ==
- List of railway stations in Japan
