= Akita Station =

Railway station in Akita, Akita Prefecture, Japan

Akita Station 秋田駅
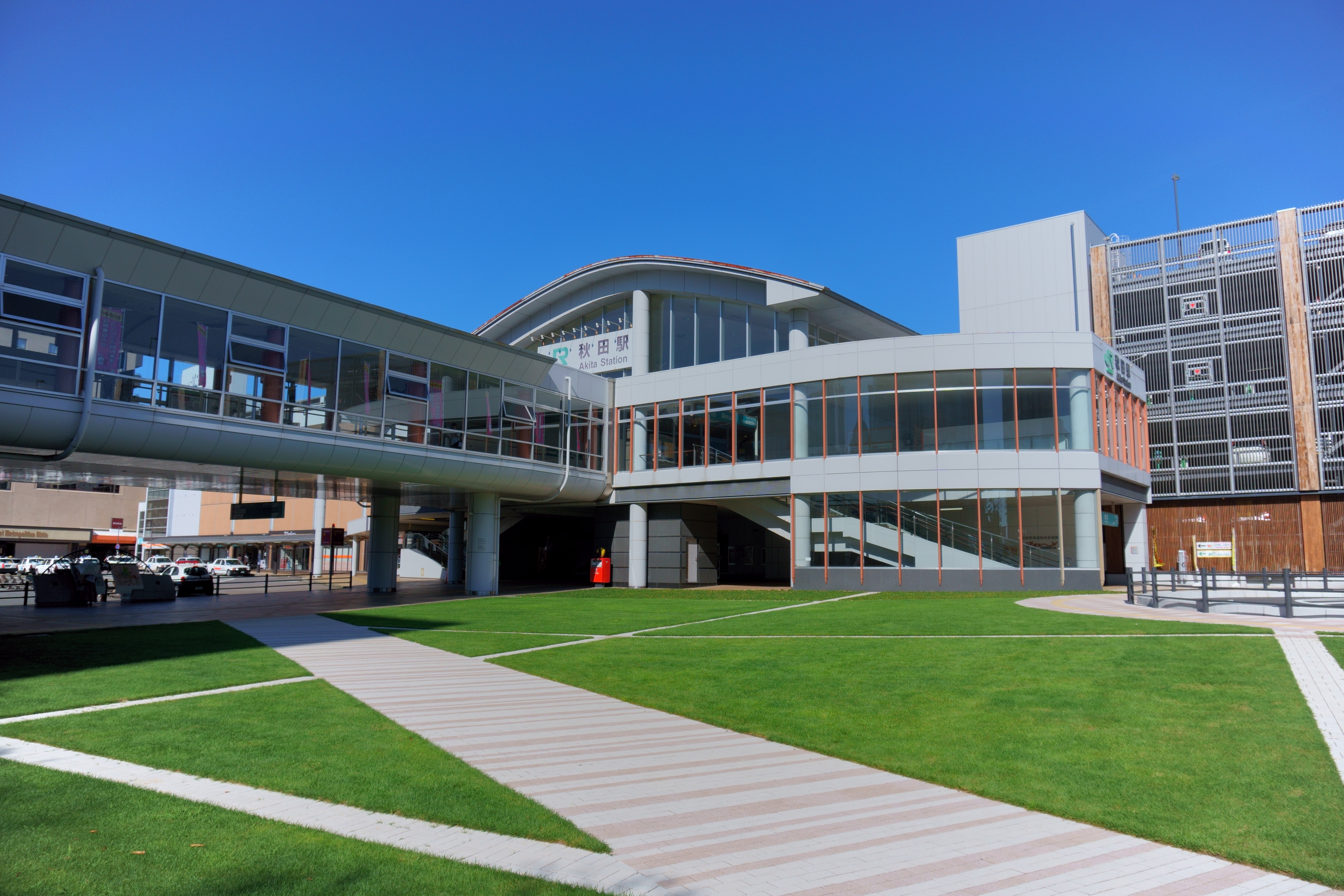
- Akita Station west exit in August 2020

General information
- Location: 7-1-2 Naka-dori; Akita City, Akita Prefecture; Japan
- Coordinates: 39°43′01″N 140°07′47″E
- Operator: JR East
- Lines: Ōu Main Line; Uetsu Main Line
- Distance: 662.6 km (411.7 mi) from Tokyo; 271.7 km (168.8 mi) from Niitsu; 298.7 km (185.6 mi) from Fukushima
- Platforms: 4 island platforms; 1 side platform; 1 bay platform
- Tracks: 10

Construction
- Structure type: At-grade
- Accessible: Yes

Other information
- Website: Official website

History
- Opened: 21 October 1902; 124 years ago
- Rebuilt: 16 March 1997; 29 years ago

Passengers
- FY2018: 10,733 daily

Services
Preceding station	JR East	Following station
Ōmagari towards Tokyo	Akita Shinkansen Komachi	Terminus
Terminus	Tsugaru	Hachirōgata towards Aomori
Yotsugoya One-way operation	Ōu Main Line Rapid	Izumi-Sotoasahikawa towards Aomori
Yotsugoya towards Shinjō	Ōu Main Line Local	Izumi-Sotoasahikawa towards Aomori
Ugo-Honjō towards Niigata	Inaho	Terminus
Ugo-Ushijima towards Niitsu	Uetsu Main Line	Terminus
Terminus	Oga Line	Izumi-Sotoasahikawa towards Oga
Location
- Location within Akita Prefecture Location within Tohoku, Japan Location within Japan

Akita Station (Japanese: 秋田駅, Hepburn: Akita-eki) is a junction railway station in the city of Akita in Akita Prefecture, Japan, operated by East Japan Railway Company (JR East).

== Lines ==
Akita Station is the northern terminus of the Akita Shinkansen, 127.3 kilometres (79.1 mi) from Morioka and 662.6 km (411.7 mi) from Tokyo. It is also the northern terminus of the Uetsu Main Line, 271.7 km (168.8 mi) from the line's starting point at Niitsu, and a station on the Ōu Main Line, 298.7 km (185.6 mi) from the line's nominal starting point at Fukashima. No passenger trains operate through to Fukashima. Most trains on the Oga Line continue beyond its nominal southern terminus at Oiwake to terminate at Akita.

== Station layout ==
The station's platforms are at ground level, with most passenger facilities located in a building above the tracks.

On the western side, the station has one side platform serving Track 2, with a bay platform for Track 1 at the northern end. Three island platforms serve the remaining tracks. The easternmost island platform, serving Tracks 7 and 8, is divided into separate northern and southern sections, creating four terminal tracks. The northern section serves Tracks 7 and 8, which use the narrow gauge, while the southern section serves Tracks 11 and 12, which use the standard gauge for the Akita Shinkansen.

The station has a staffed Midori no Madoguchi ticket office, an Akita Tourist Information Center, and several NewDays convenience stores. A Topico department store is located inside the station building near the west entrance.

=== Platforms ===
1	■Ōu Main Line	for Higashi-Noshiro, Ōdate, and Aomori
1	■Oga Line	for Oga
2–6	■Ōu Main Line	for Higashi-Noshiro, Ōdate, and Aomori
2–6	■Ōu Main Line	for Ōmagari, Yokote and Shinjō
2–6	■Uetsu Main Line	for Ugo-Honjō, Sakata, and Niigata
2–6	■Oga Line	for Oga
7/8	■Ōu Main Line	for Higashi-Noshiro, Ōdate, and Aomori
7/8	■Oga Line	for Oga
11/12	■Akita Shinkansen	Komachi for Morioka, Sendai, and Tokyo

== History ==
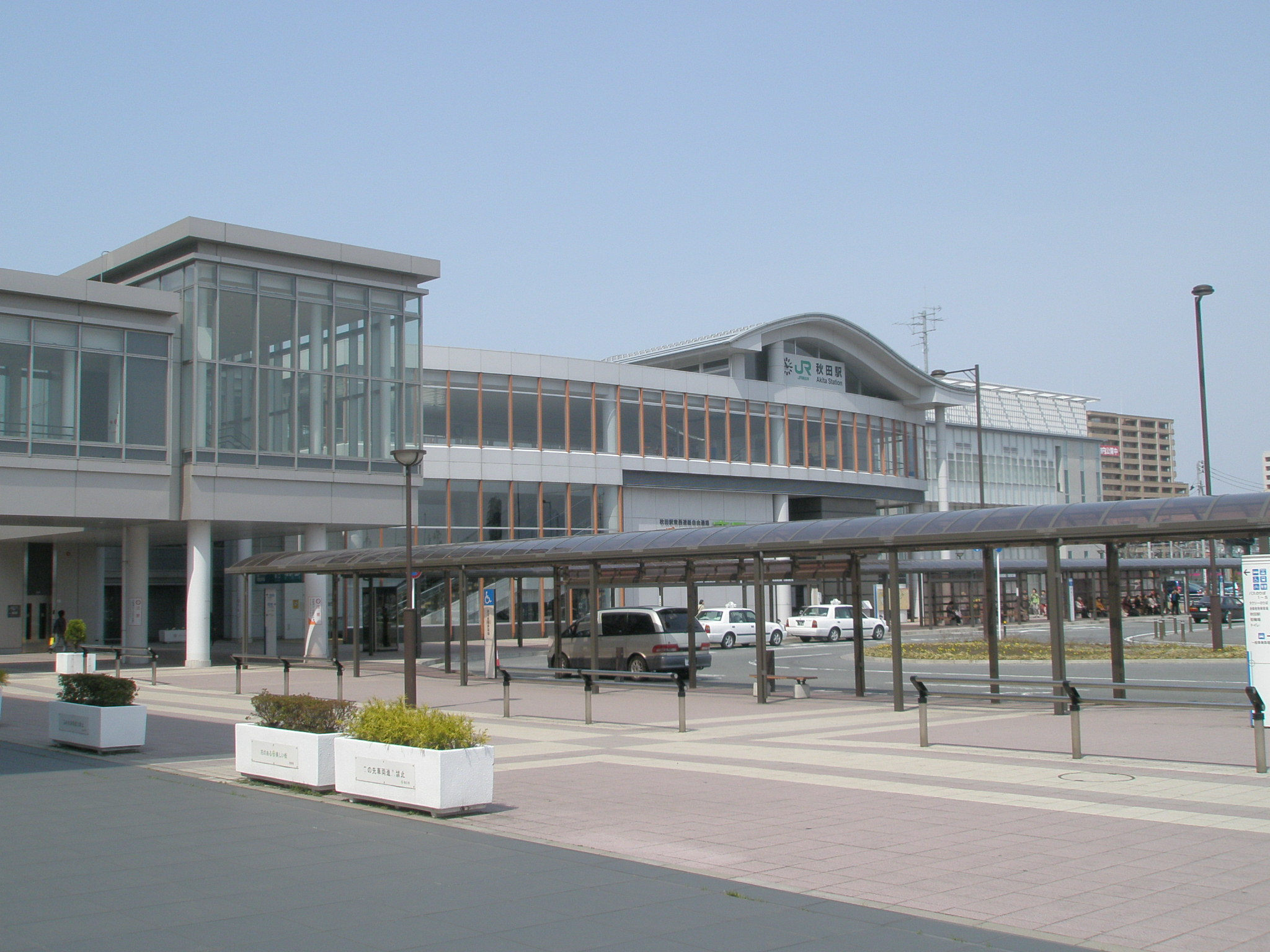
The station building in 2008.

Akita Station opened on 21 October 1902. The station was absorbed into the JR East network upon the privatization of JNR on 1 April 1987. The station's building was renovated in 1997.

== Passenger statistics ==
In fiscal 2018, the station was used by an average of 10,733 passengers daily (boarding passengers only). The passenger figures for previous years are as shown below.

Fiscal year	Daily average
2000	13,919
2005	12,509
2010	11,369
2015	10,933

== Surrounding area ==
- Akita Northern Gate Square
- Akitaekimae post office
- AL☆Ve (shopping/hotel complex near the east entrance)
- Kanto festival (five-minute walk from the west entrance)
- Senshu park

== Bus terminals ==
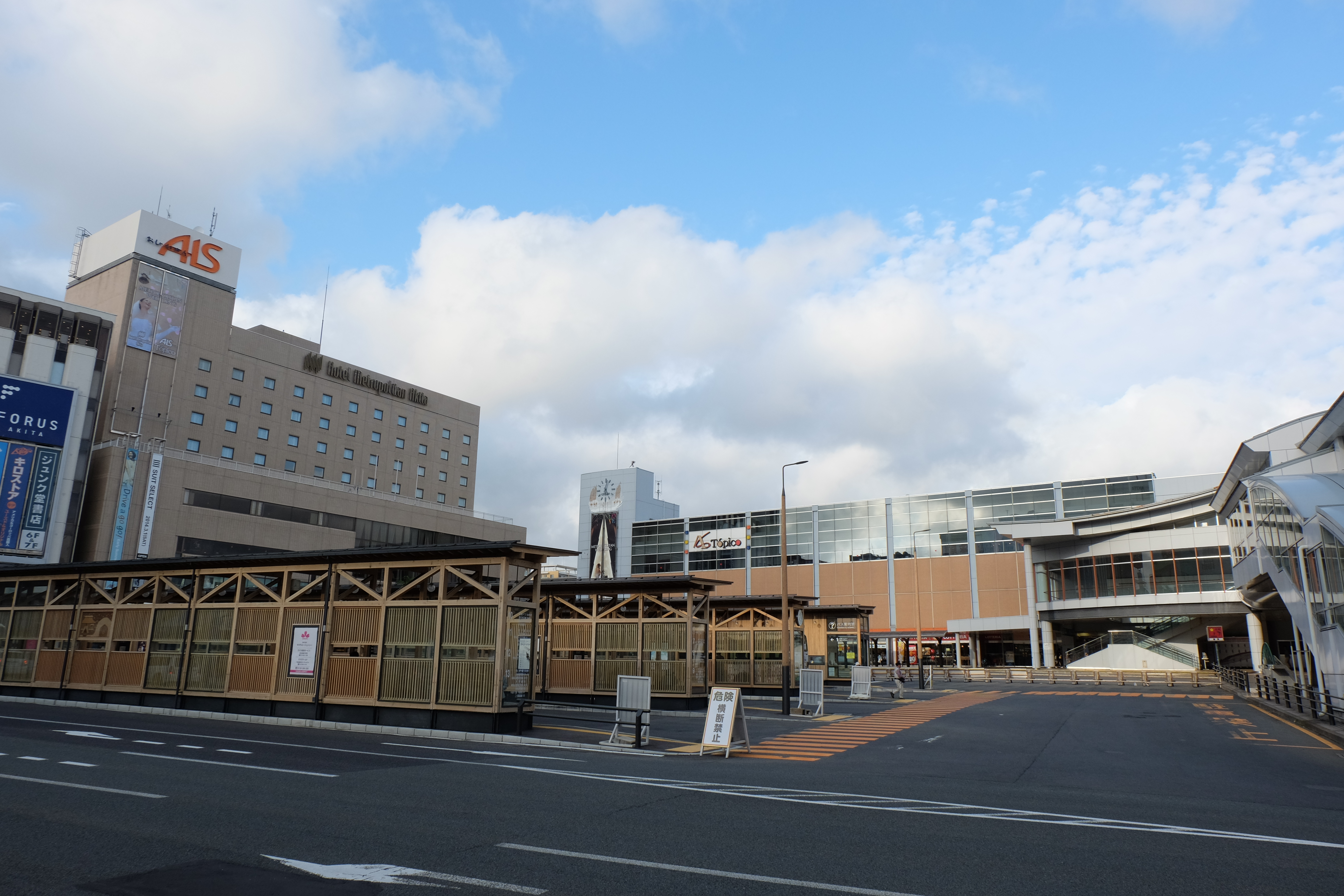
West bus terminals in 2014

=== Long-distance buses ===
- For Yokote Station, Jūmonji, Yuzawa Station
- For Noshiro Station
- Senshu; For Sendai Station (Miyagi)
- Flora; For Shinjuku Station
- Dream Akita/Yokohama; For Tokyo Station and Yokohama Station

== See also ==
- List of railway stations in Japan
