= Oga Aquarium Gao =

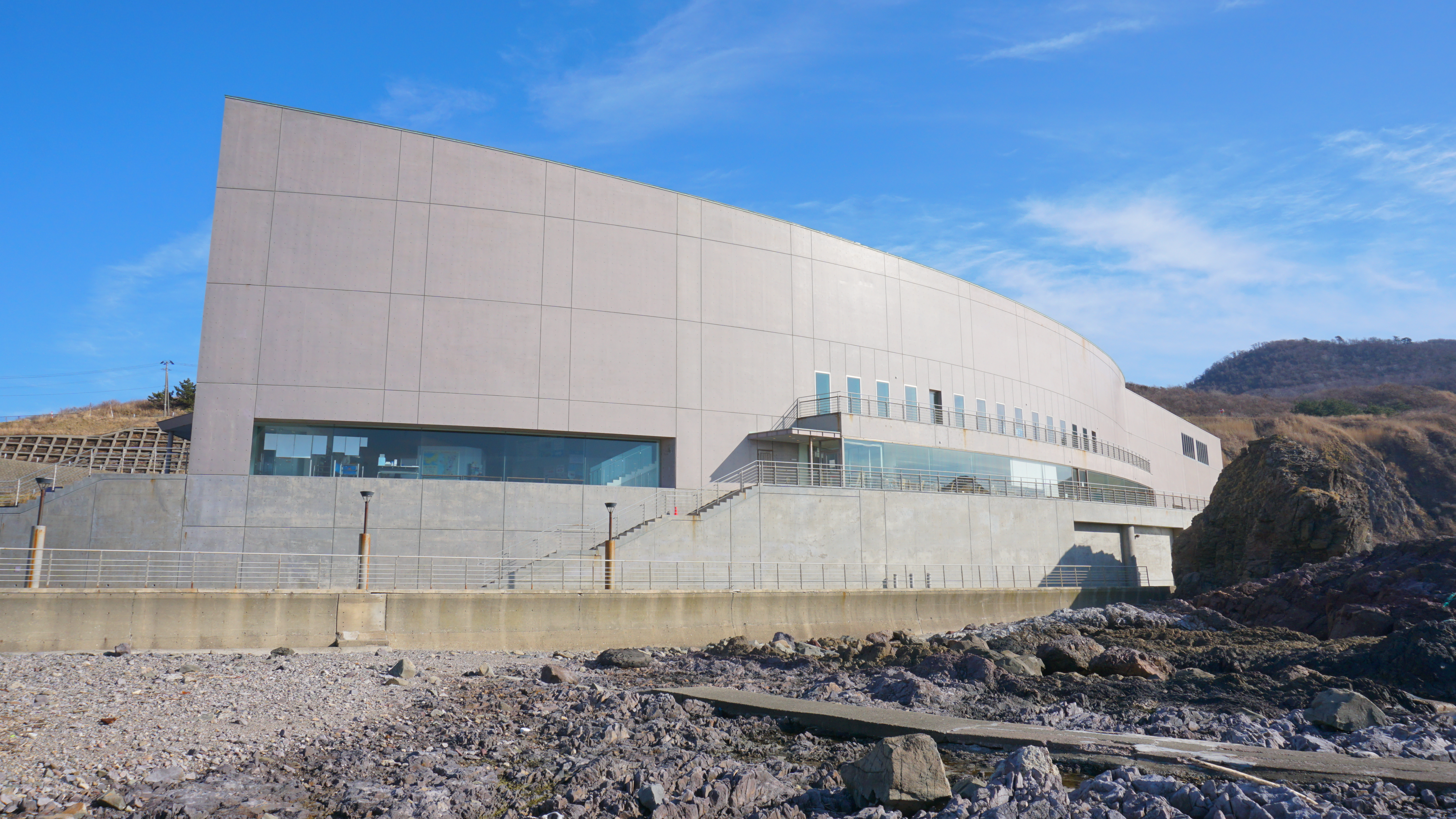
- The aquarium in 2020
- Interactive map of Oga Aquarium Gao
- 39°56′32″N 139°42′16″E
- Date opened: 1967 (former); 13 July 2004 (current)
- Location: Oga, Akita, Japan
- No. of animals: 10,000
- No. of species: 400
- Volume of largest tank: 800,000 litres (211,000 US gal)
- Total volume of tanks: 1,423,000 litres (376,000 US gal)
- Memberships: JAZA
- Website: www.gao-aqua.jp

Oga Aquarium Gao (男鹿水族館ガオ, Oga Suizokukan Gao), officially Akita Prefectural Oga Aquarium, is a public aquarium located along Oga Peninsula coast, Oga, Akita Prefecture, Japan. GAO stands for Globe, Aqua and Ocean, with the imagery of the logo inspired by Namahage.

== Overview ==
Overlooking the Sea of Japan, the aquarium exhibits over 10,000 species of marine life, including those from Akita Prefecture's abundant marine resources, and over 400 species of rare aquatic animals from around the world. The aquarium features the only water tank in Japan where Japanese sandfish are exhibited year round. The aquarium also has a touch pool, where visitors can handle marine life such as sea urchins and sea cucumbers. During the New Year’s season, divers dress up as Namahage and feed the fish in the main tank. The aquarium has appeared in the 2004 film Tsuribaka Nisshi 15.

== History ==
The former Akita Prefectural Aquarium was founded in 1967, and displayed 300 species, including Japanese sandfish, penguins, otters, and spectacled caimans.

== Exhibits ==
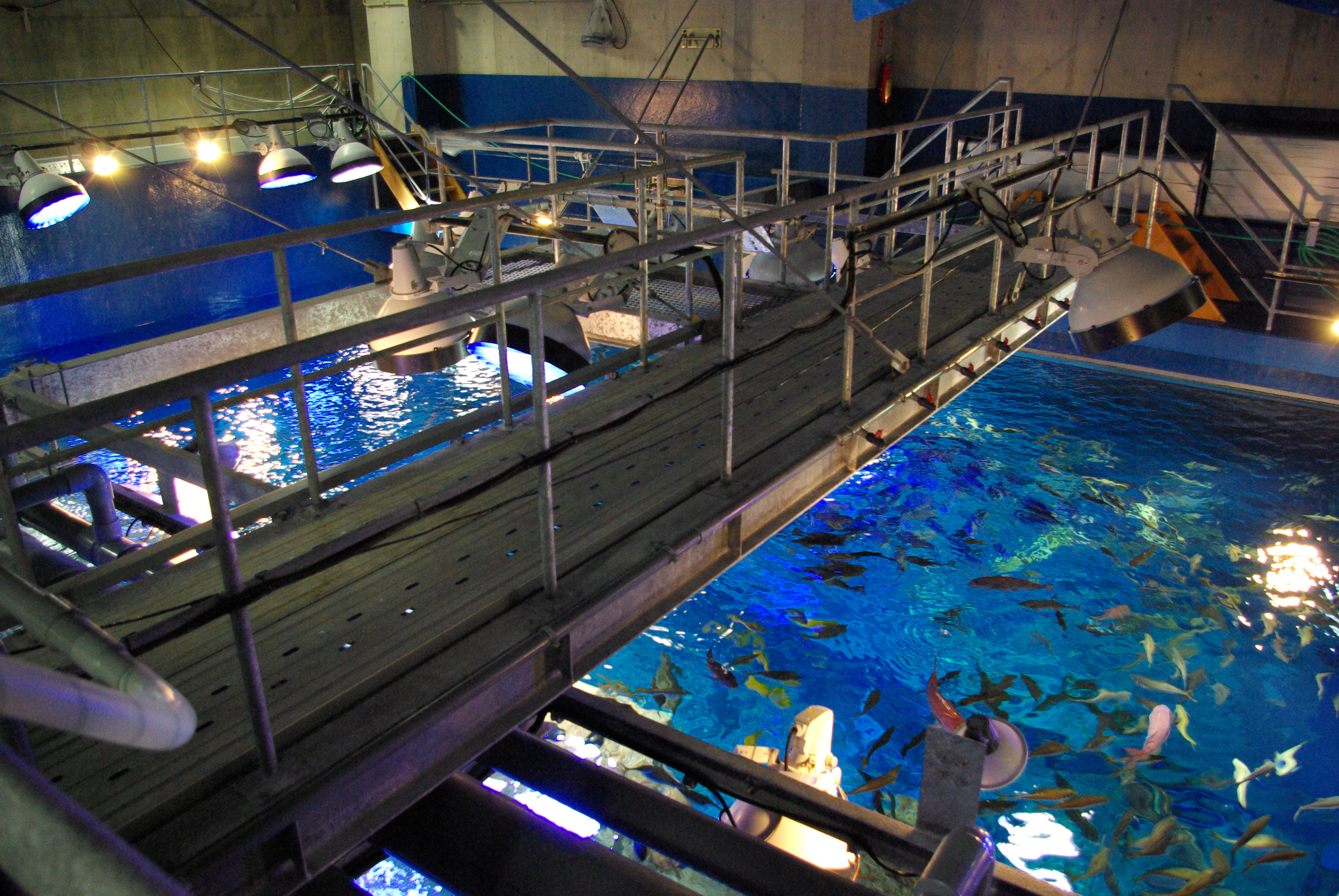
Main tank – 8 meters deep and 800 tons

- Live sharksucker
- Red seabream
- Takifugu xanthopterus
- Japanese red seaperch
- Pitted stingray
- Green sea turtle
- Japanese poacher
- Stereolepis
- Omobranchus elegans
- Japanese spider crab
- Sea raven
- Japanese tree frog
- Pond loach
- Tabira bitterling
- Pungitius
- Japanese fluvial sculpin
- Common carp
- Montane brown frog
- Southern fiddler ray
- Melbourne skate
- Nezumi fugu
- Spotted garden eel
- Green chromis
- Xingu River ray
- Piranha
- Southern rockhopper penguin
- Northern sea nettle
- Earless seal
- Sea lion
- Jellyfish
- Japanese sandfish

== Gallery ==
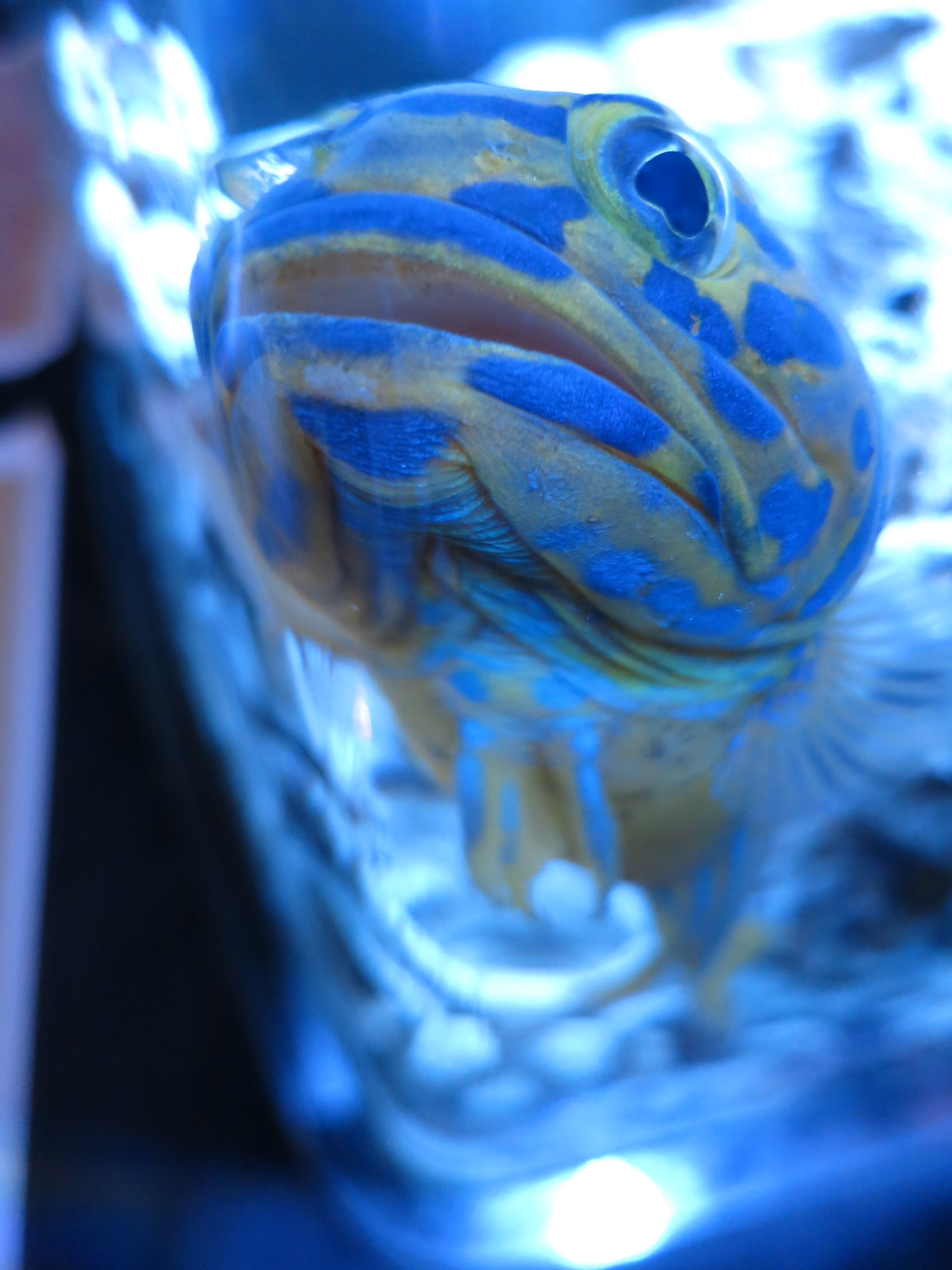
Opistognathus decorus

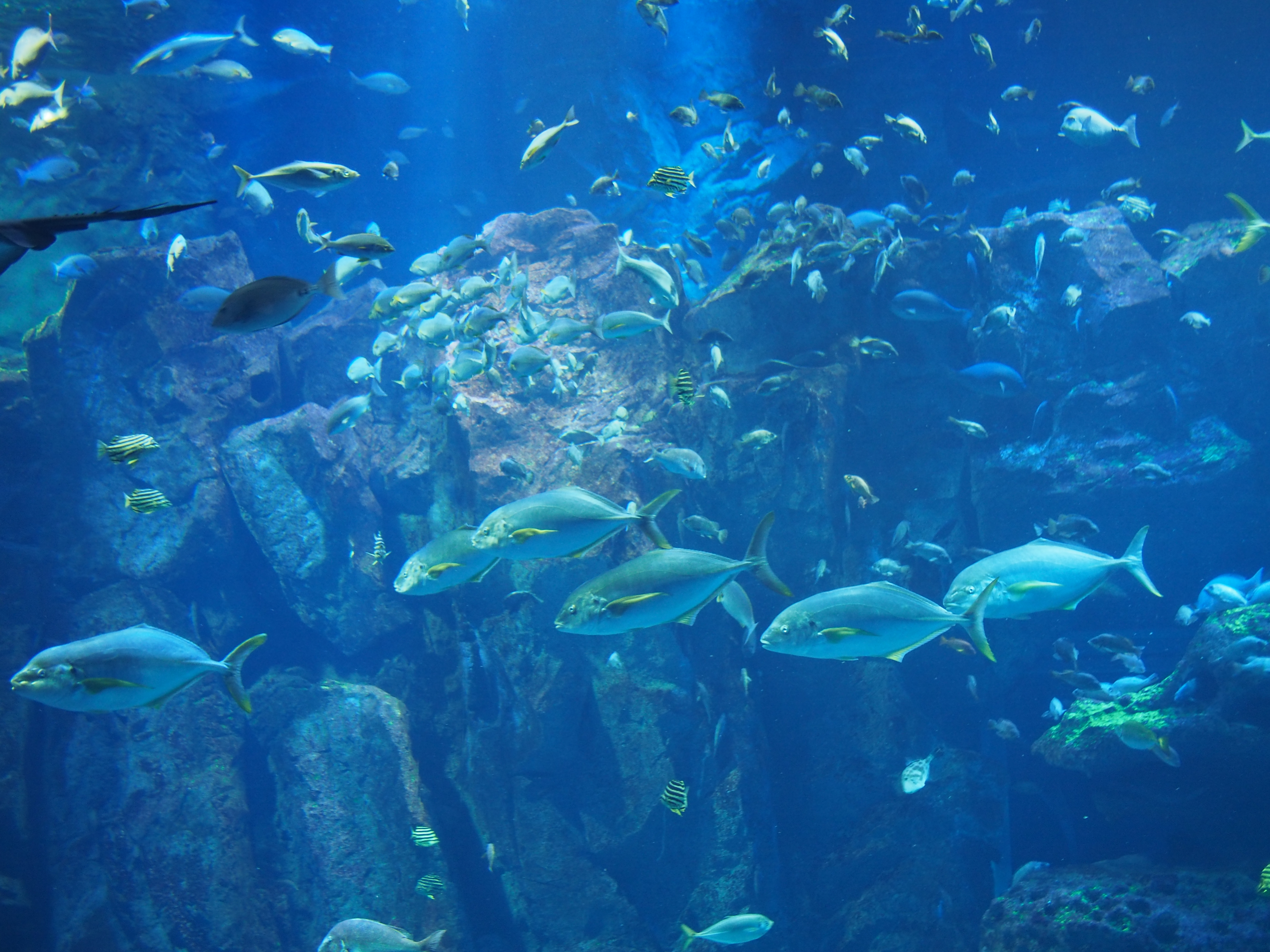

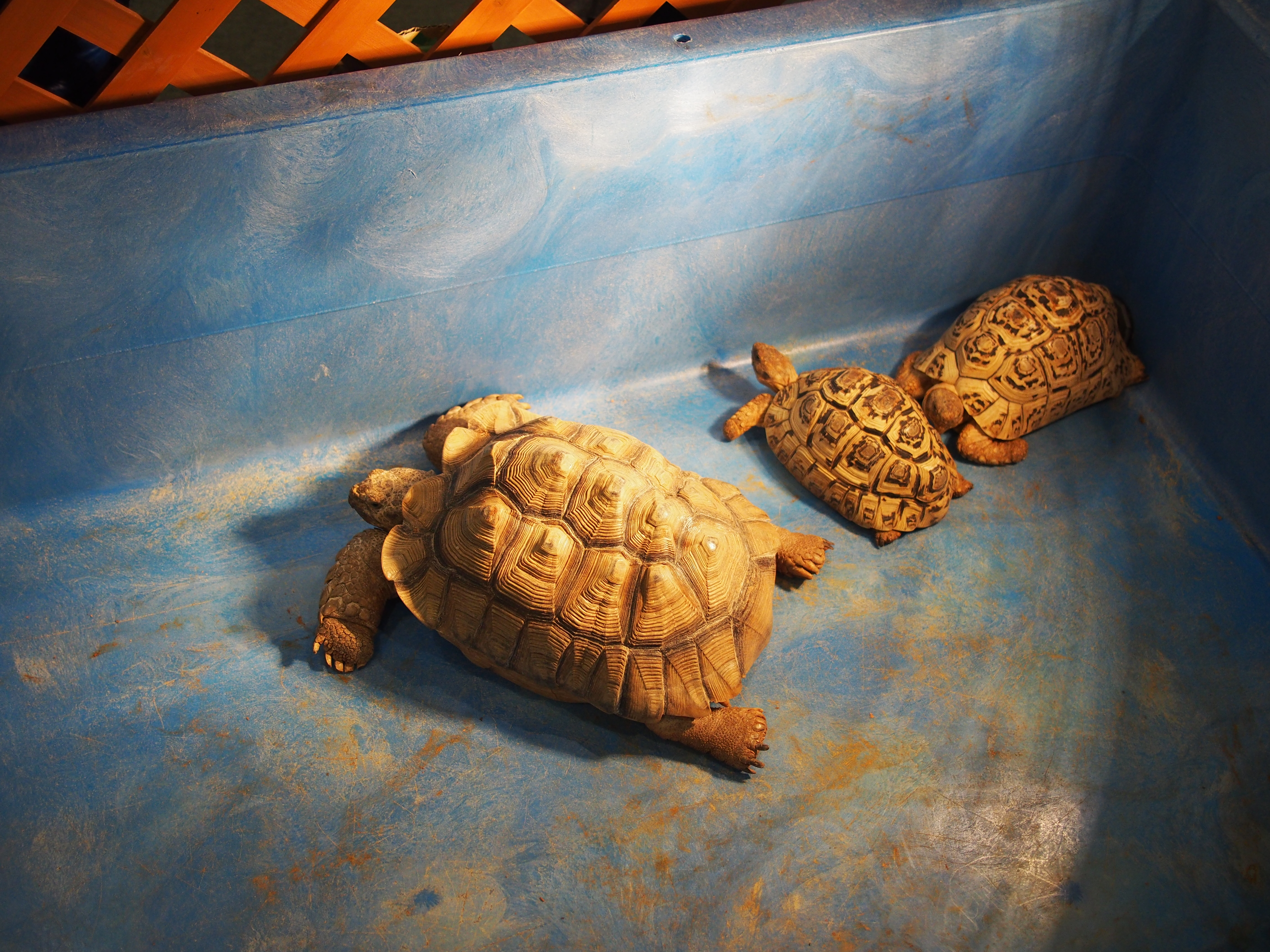

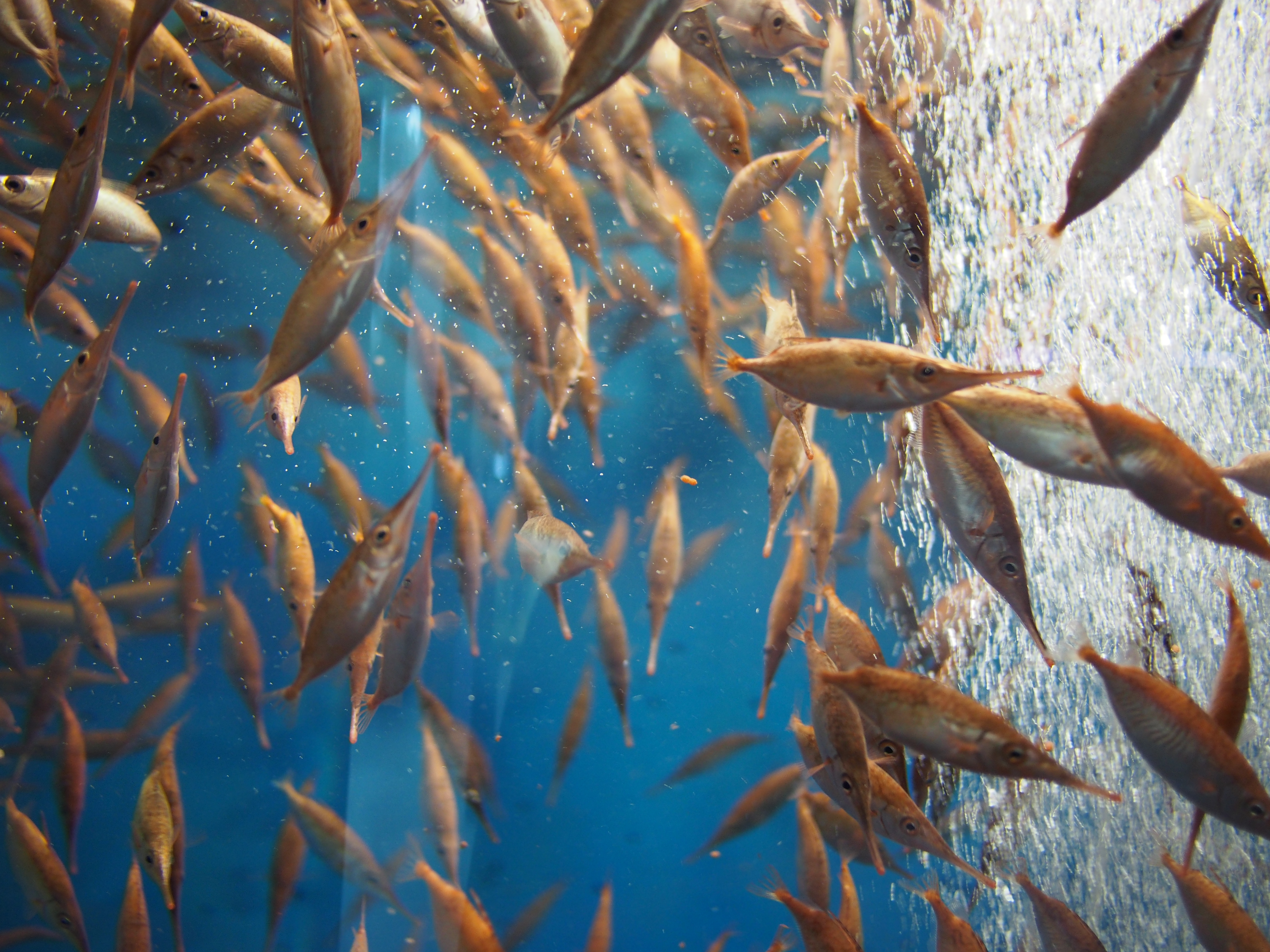

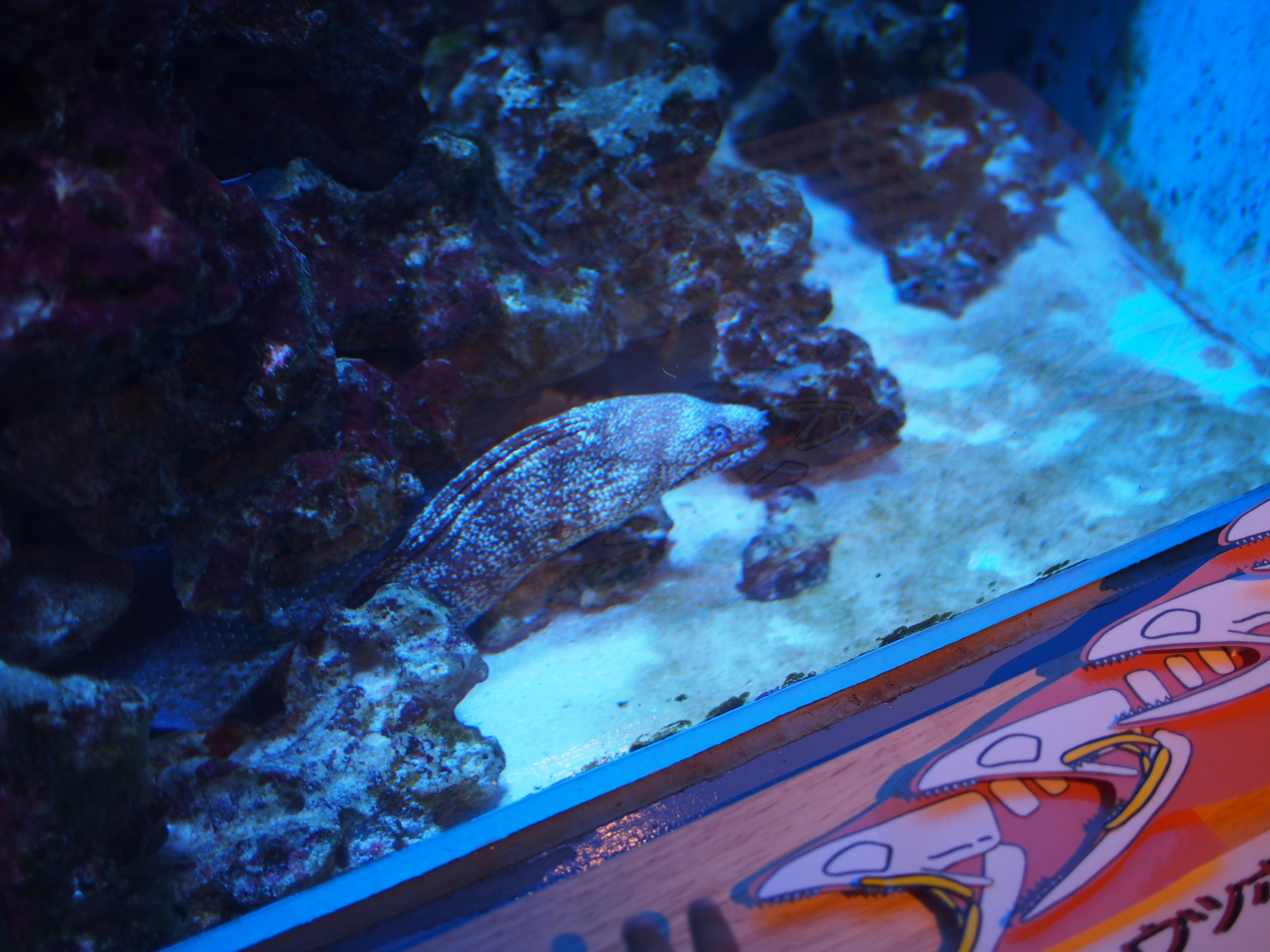

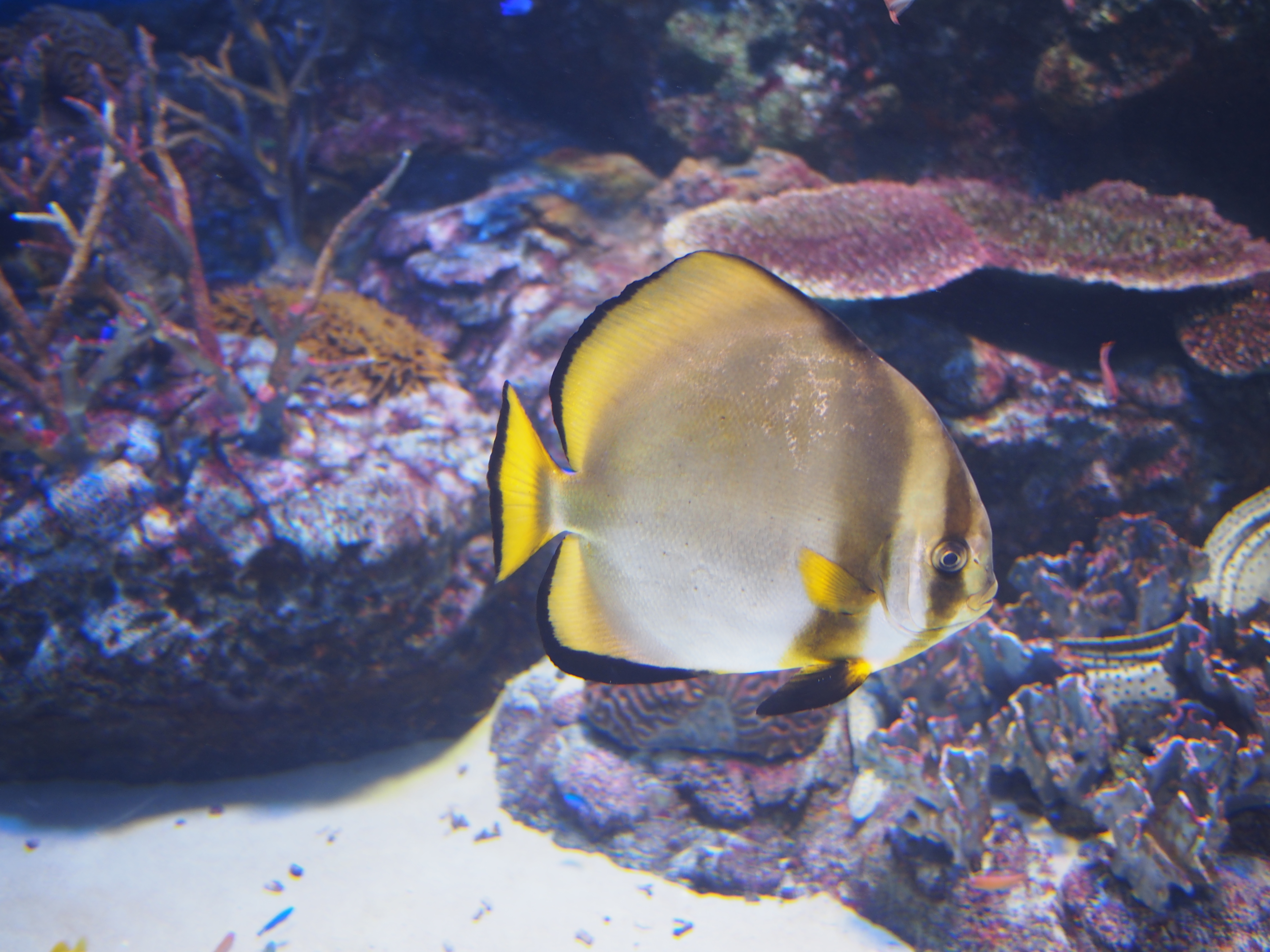

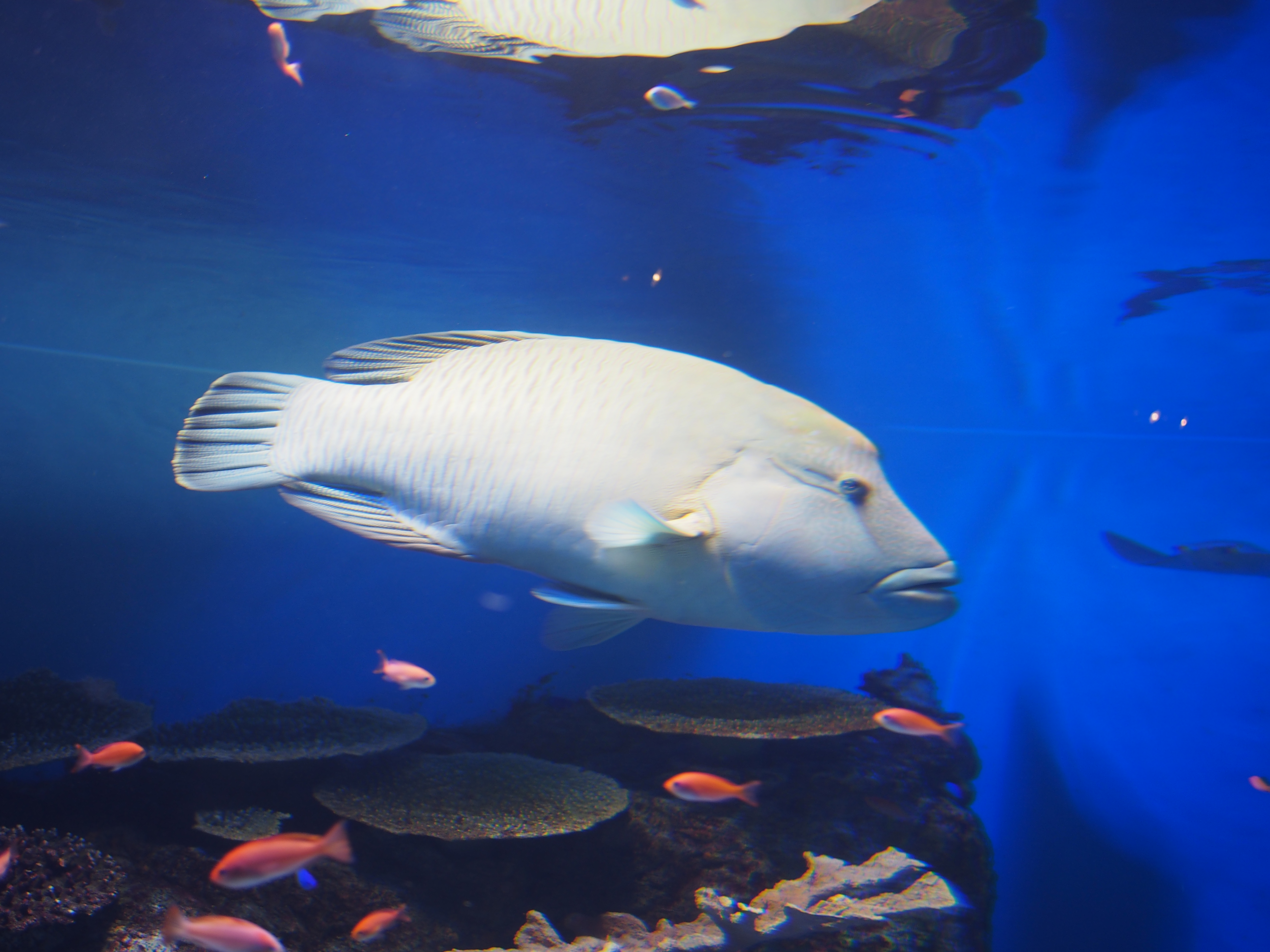

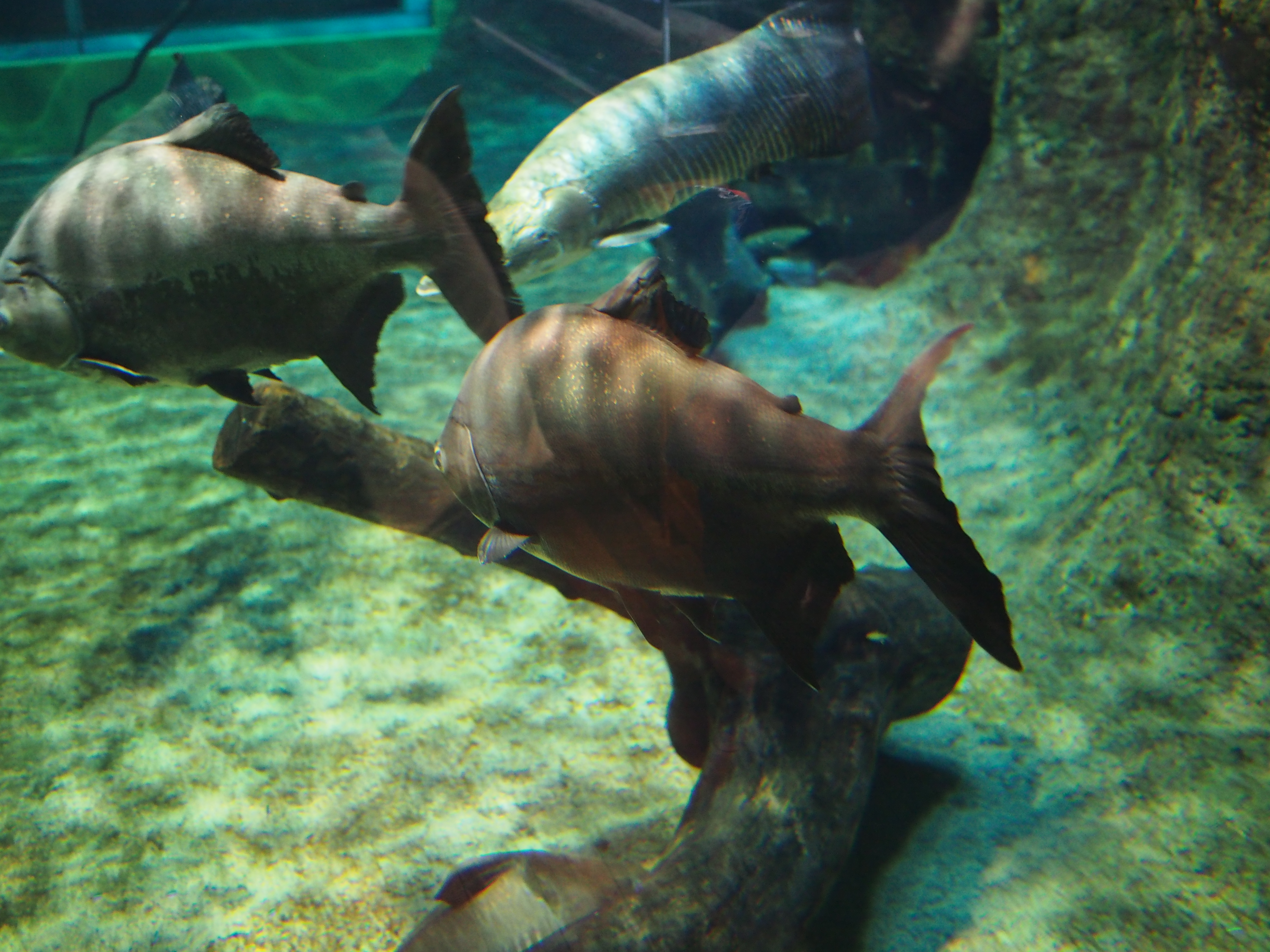

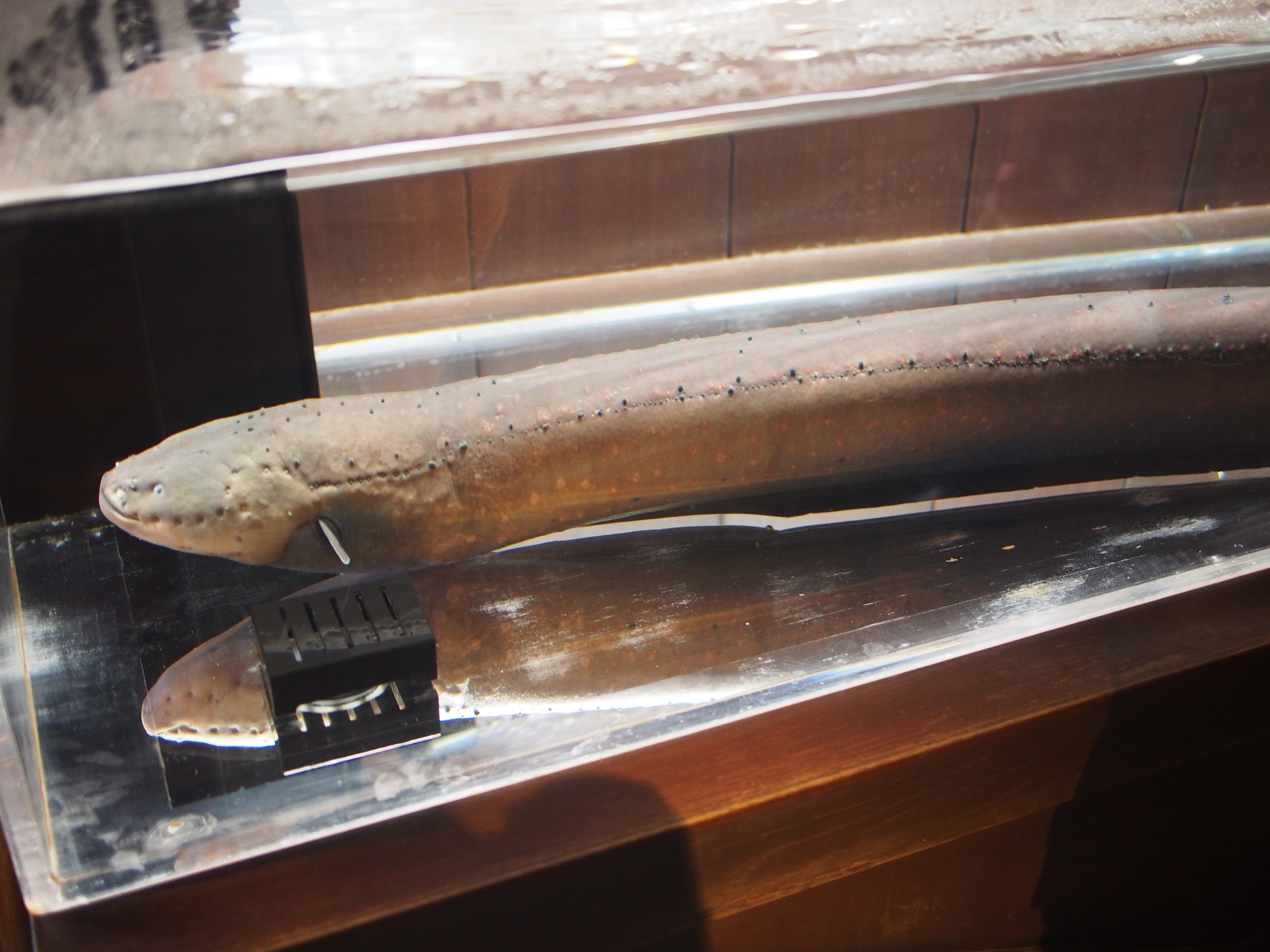
Electric eel

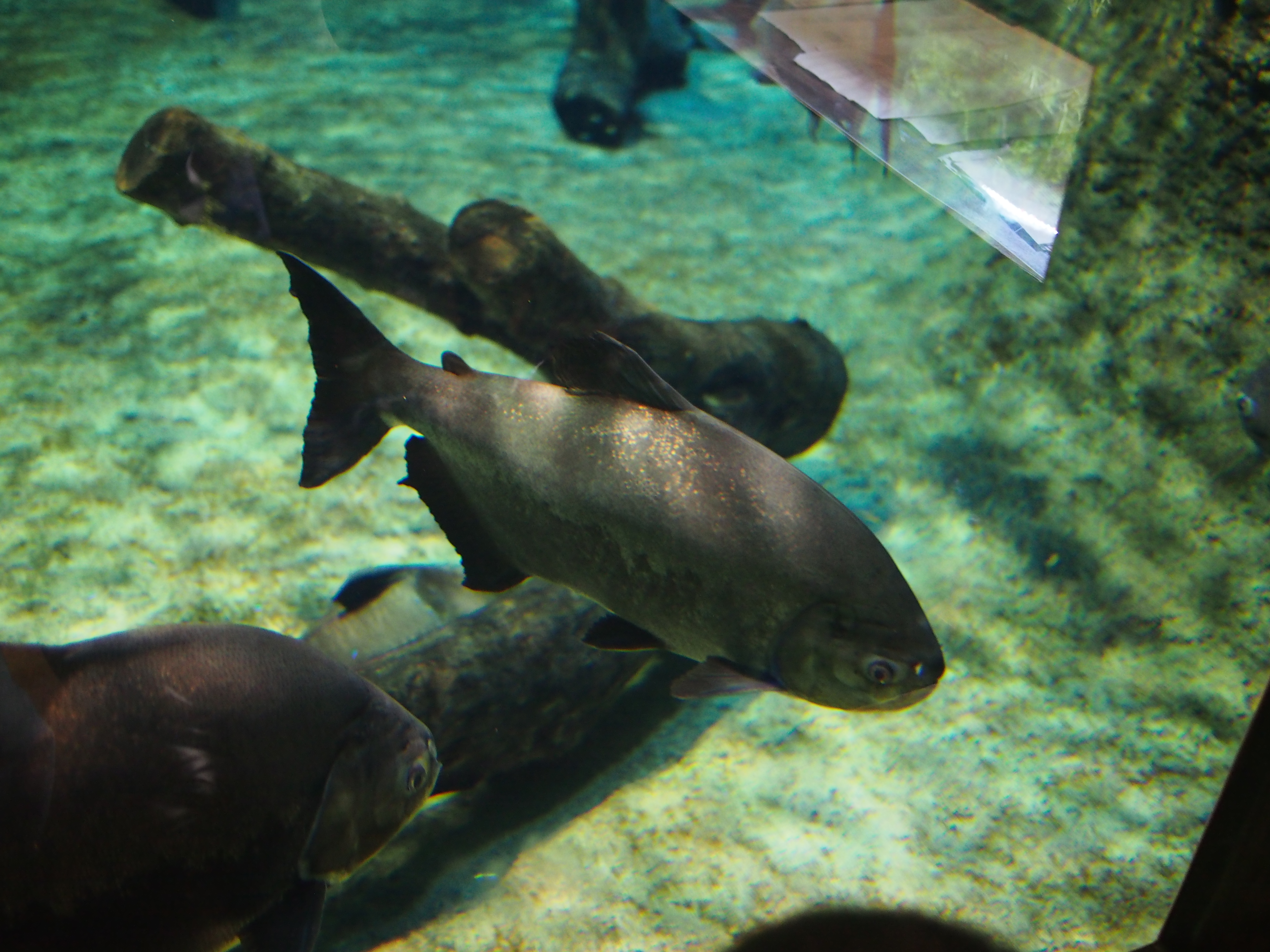

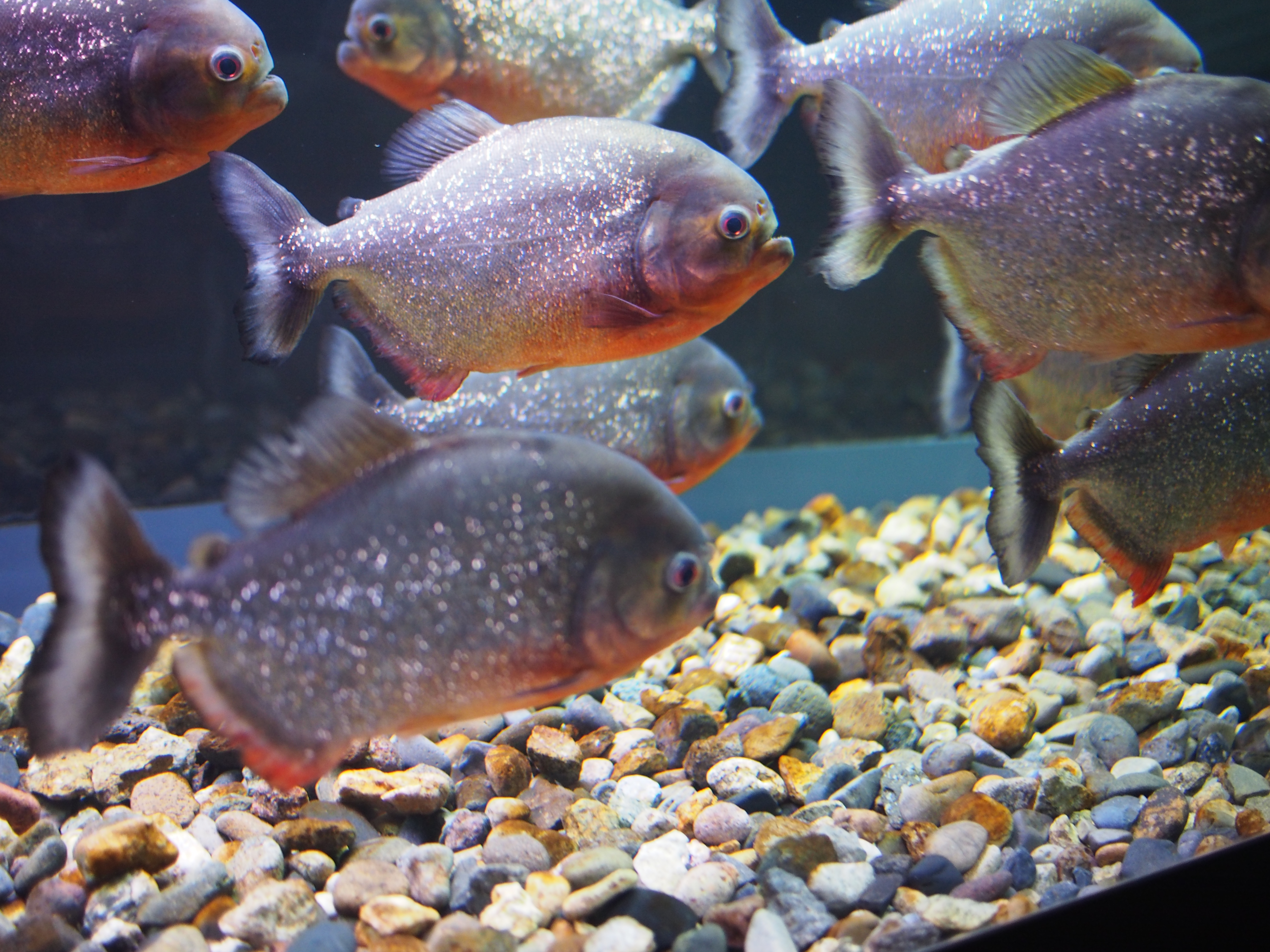

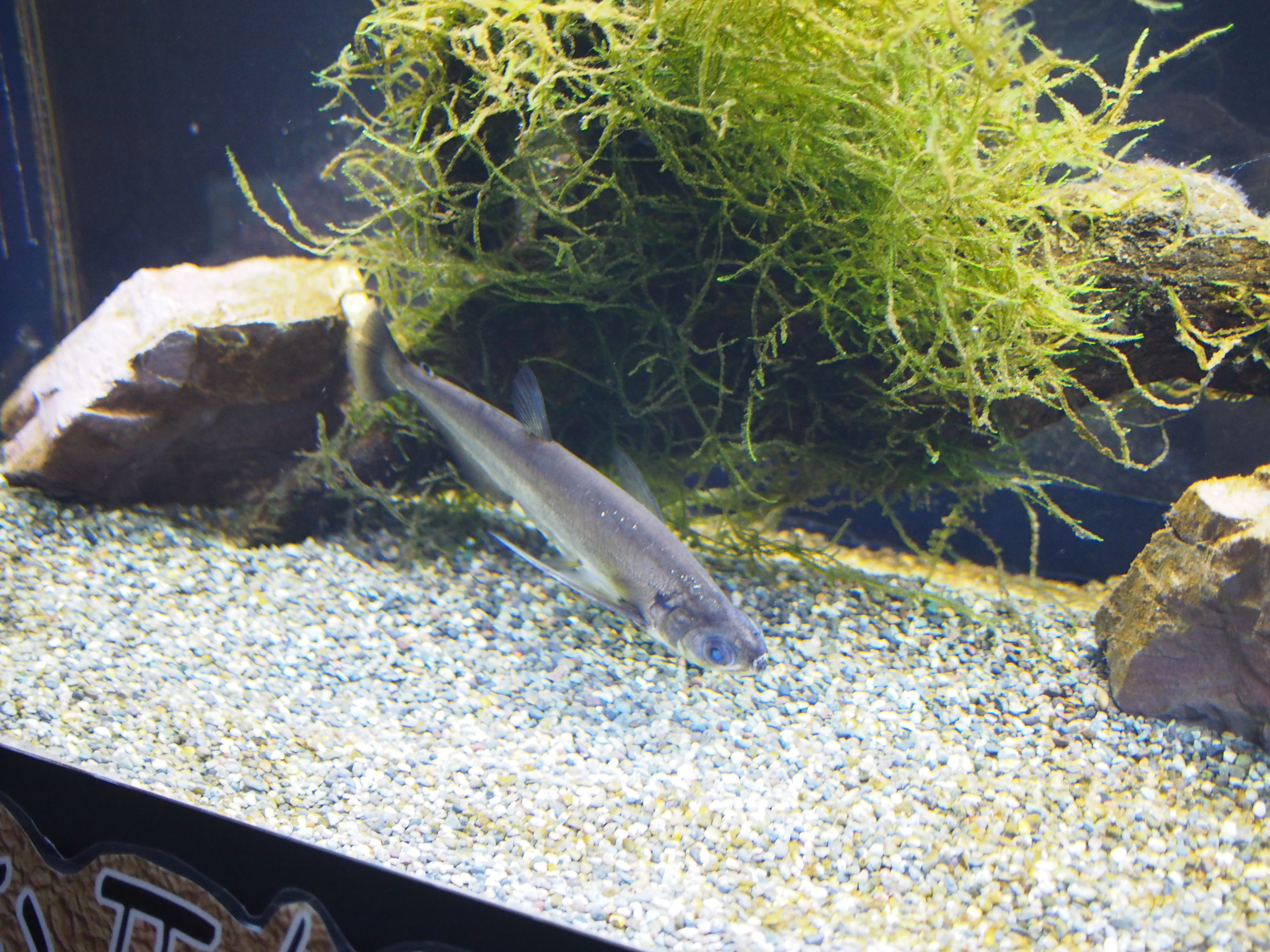

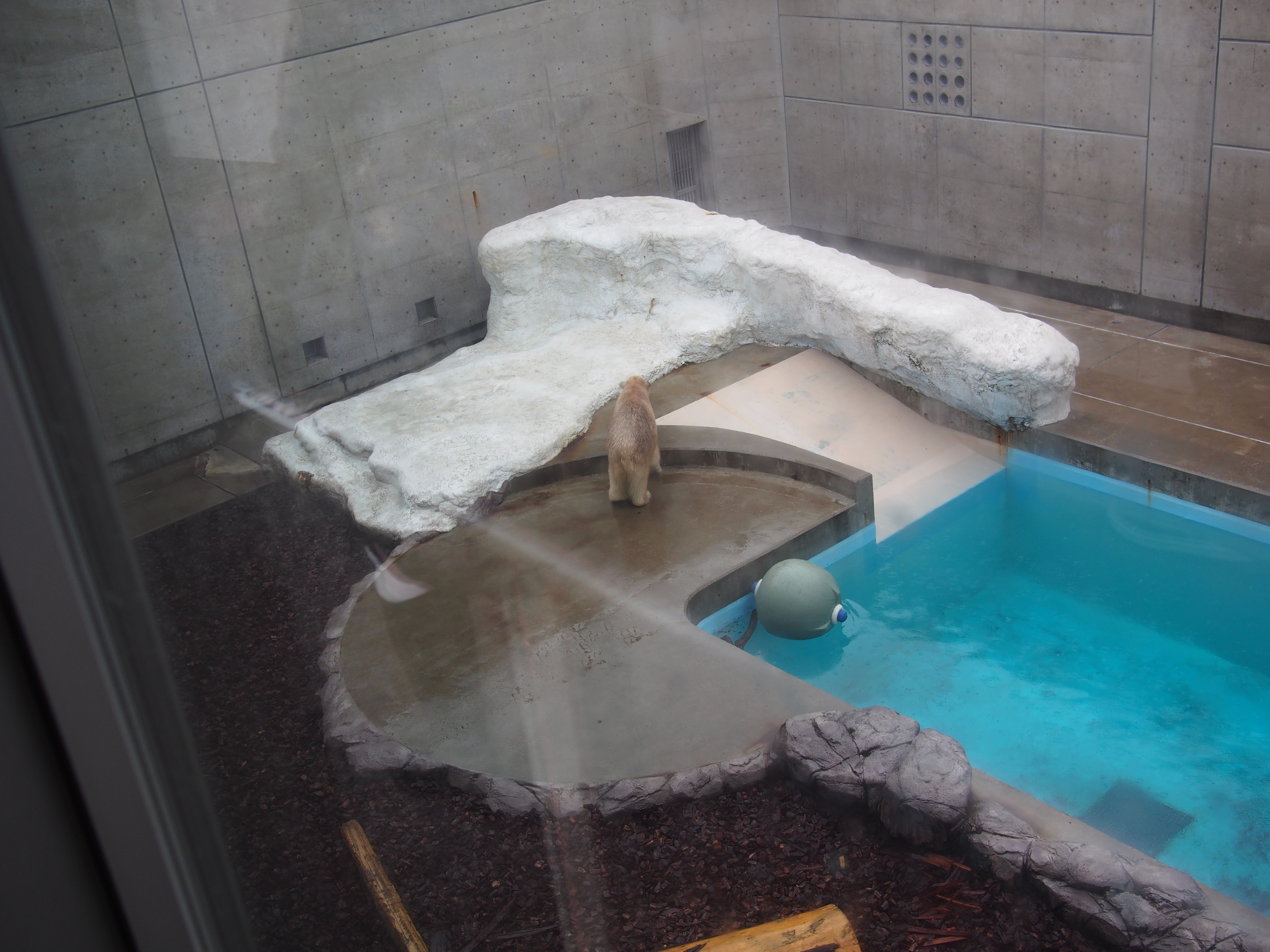

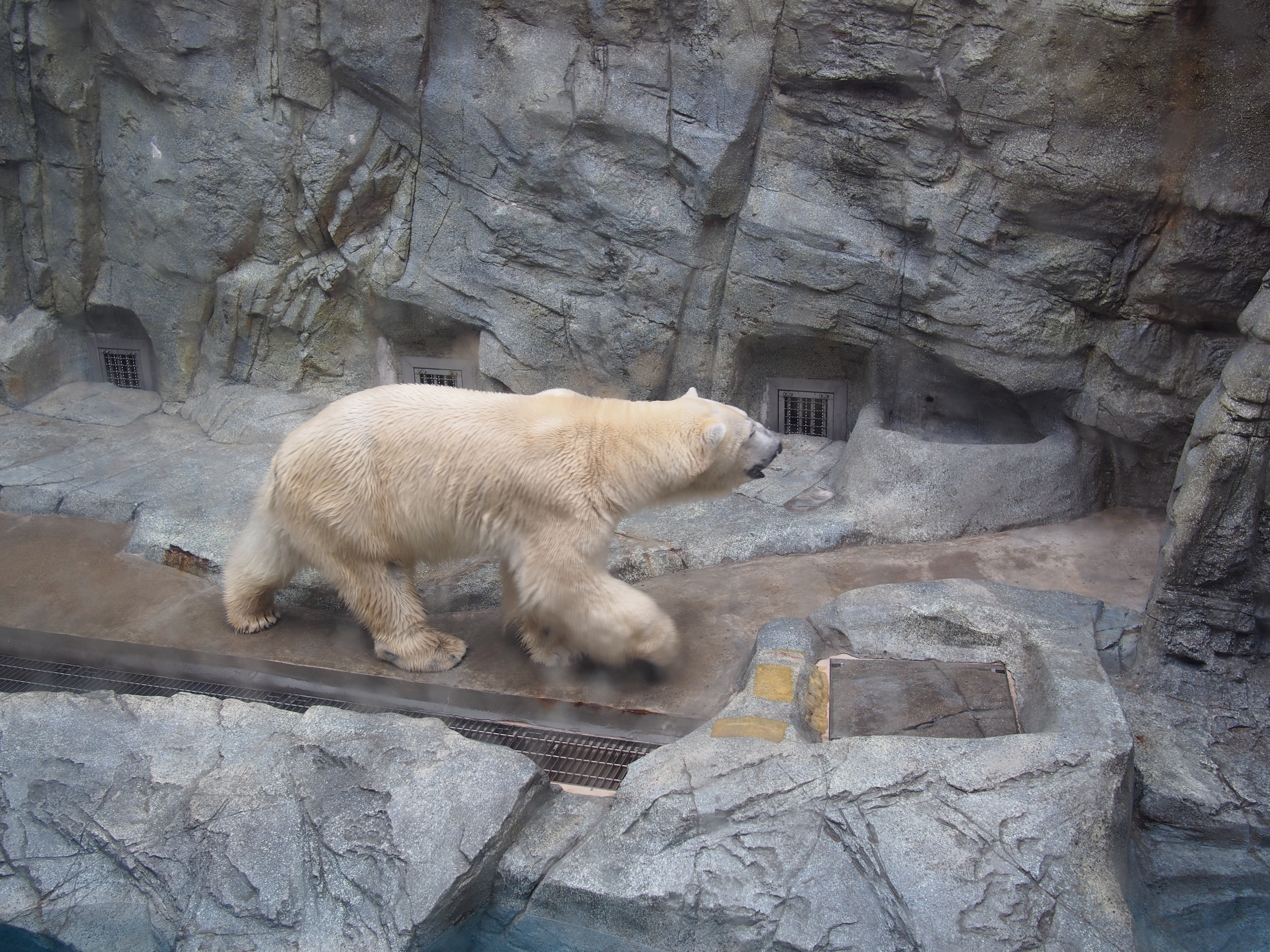
Polar bears

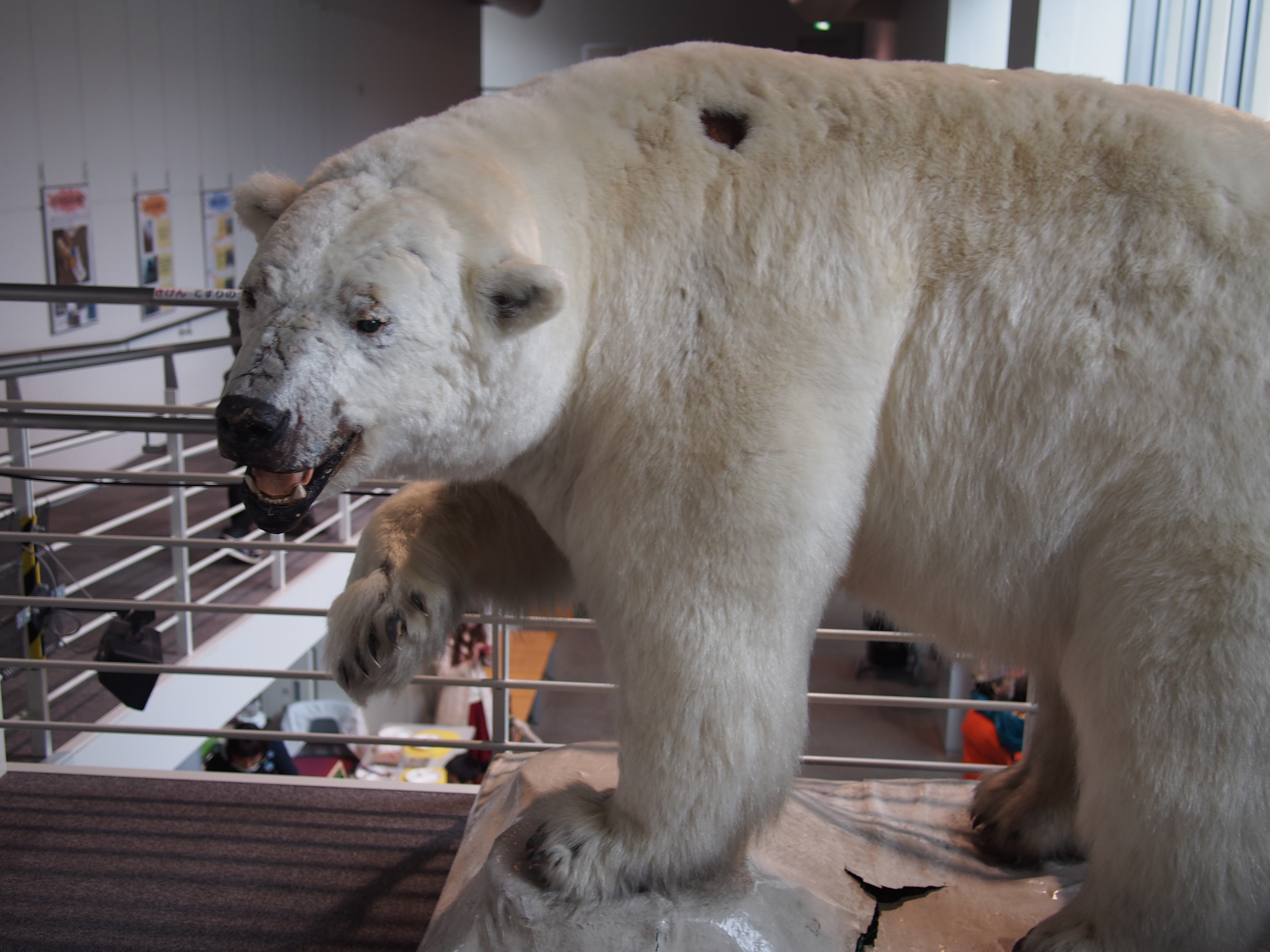

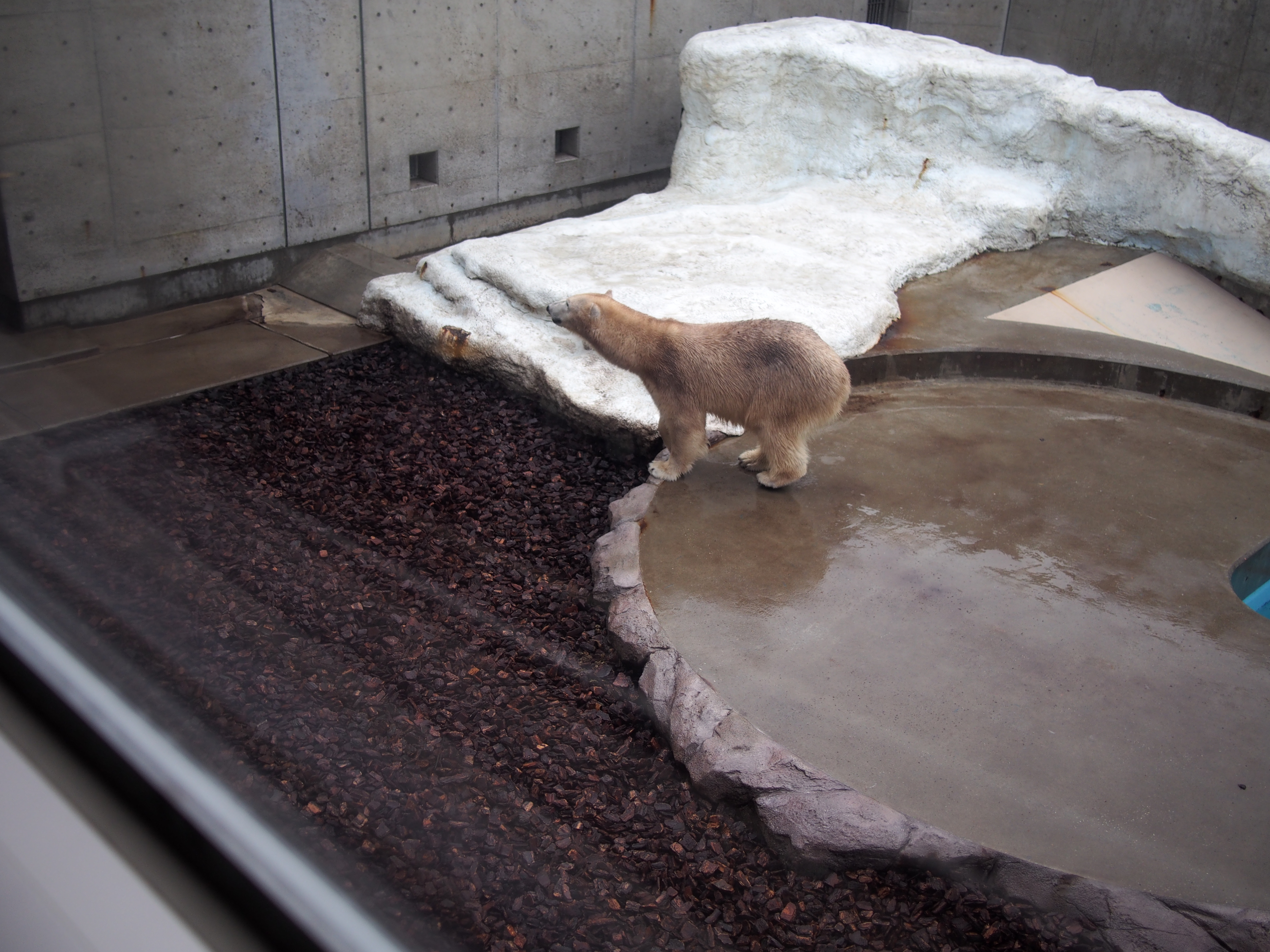

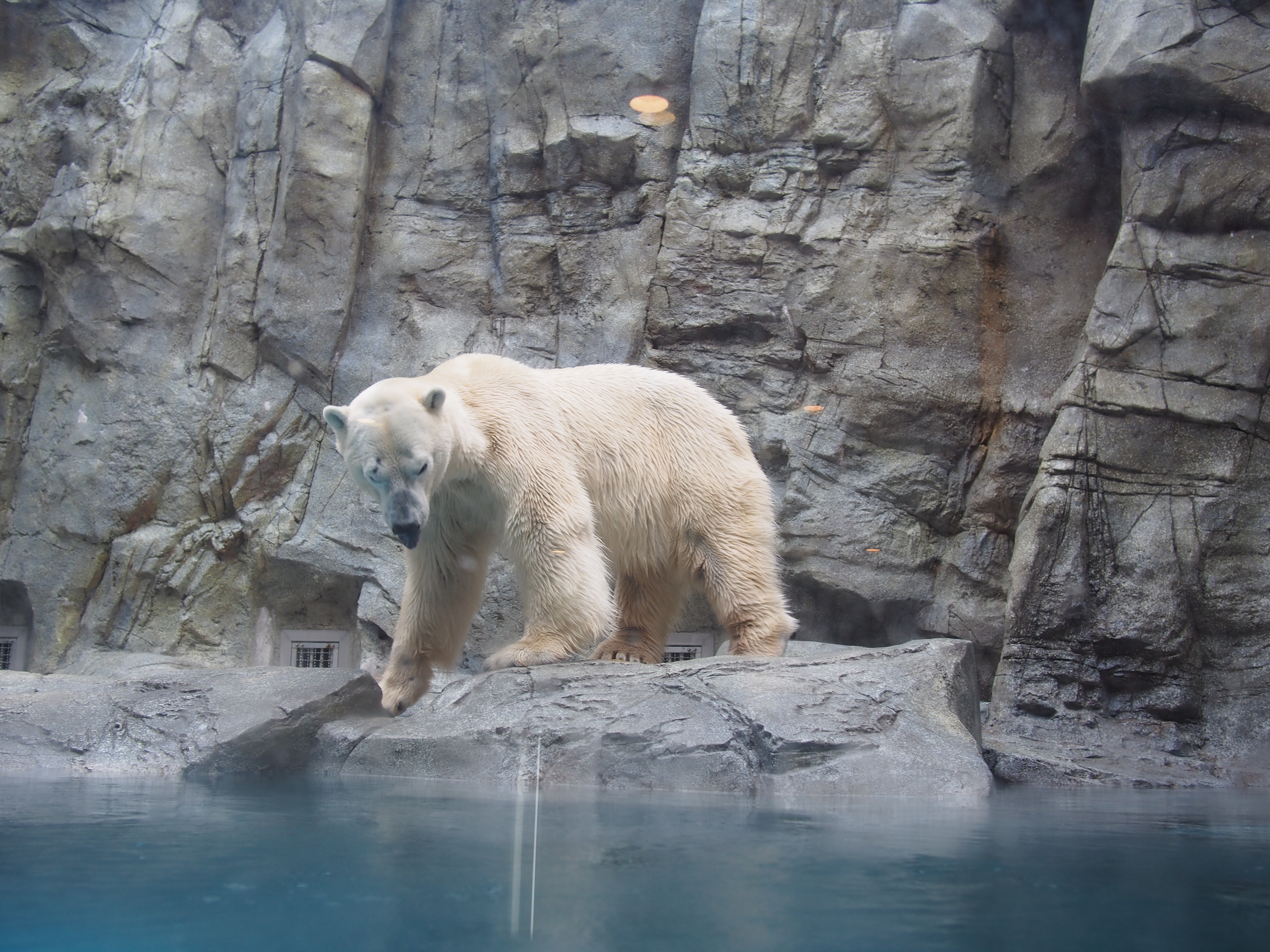

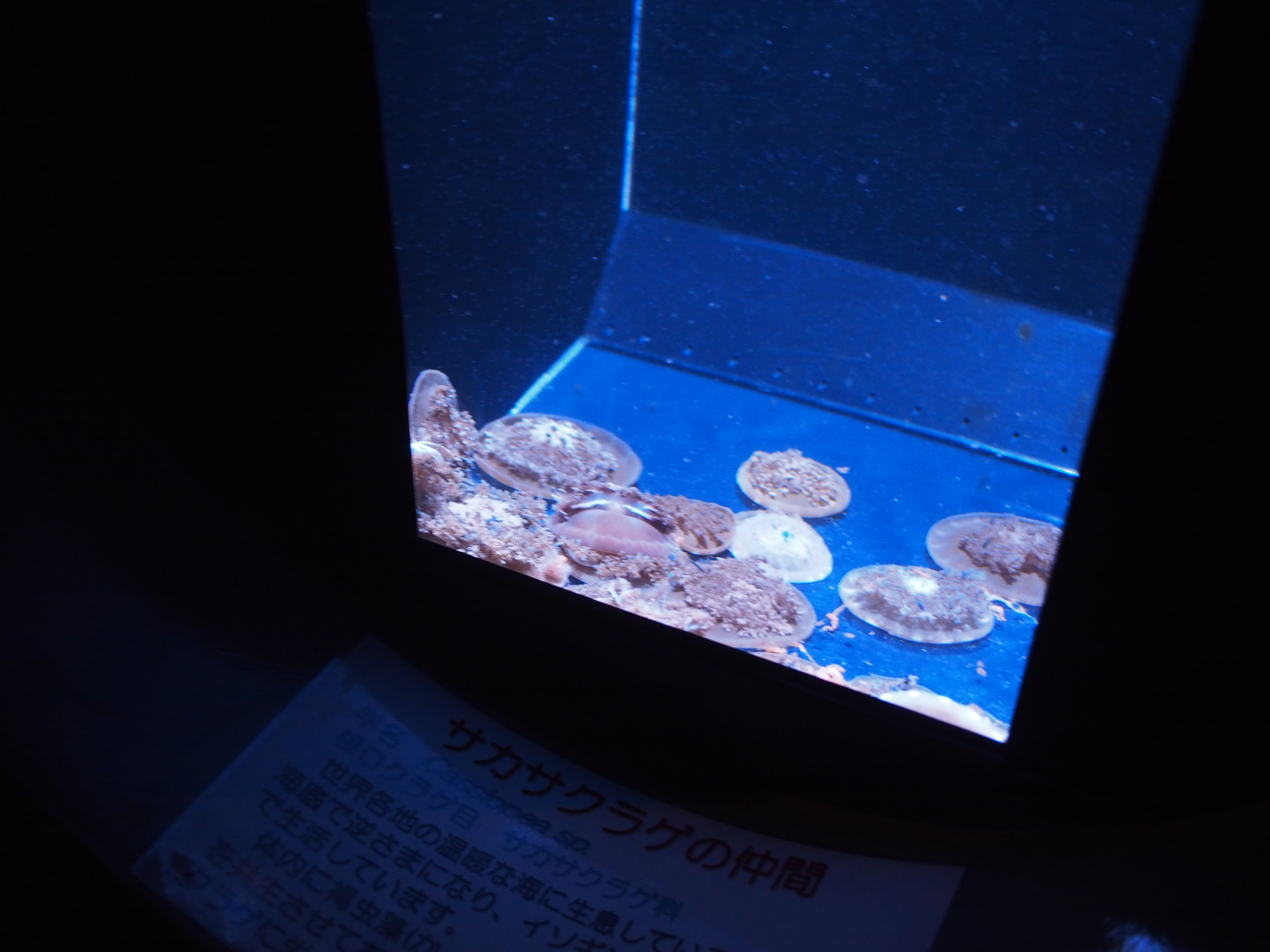

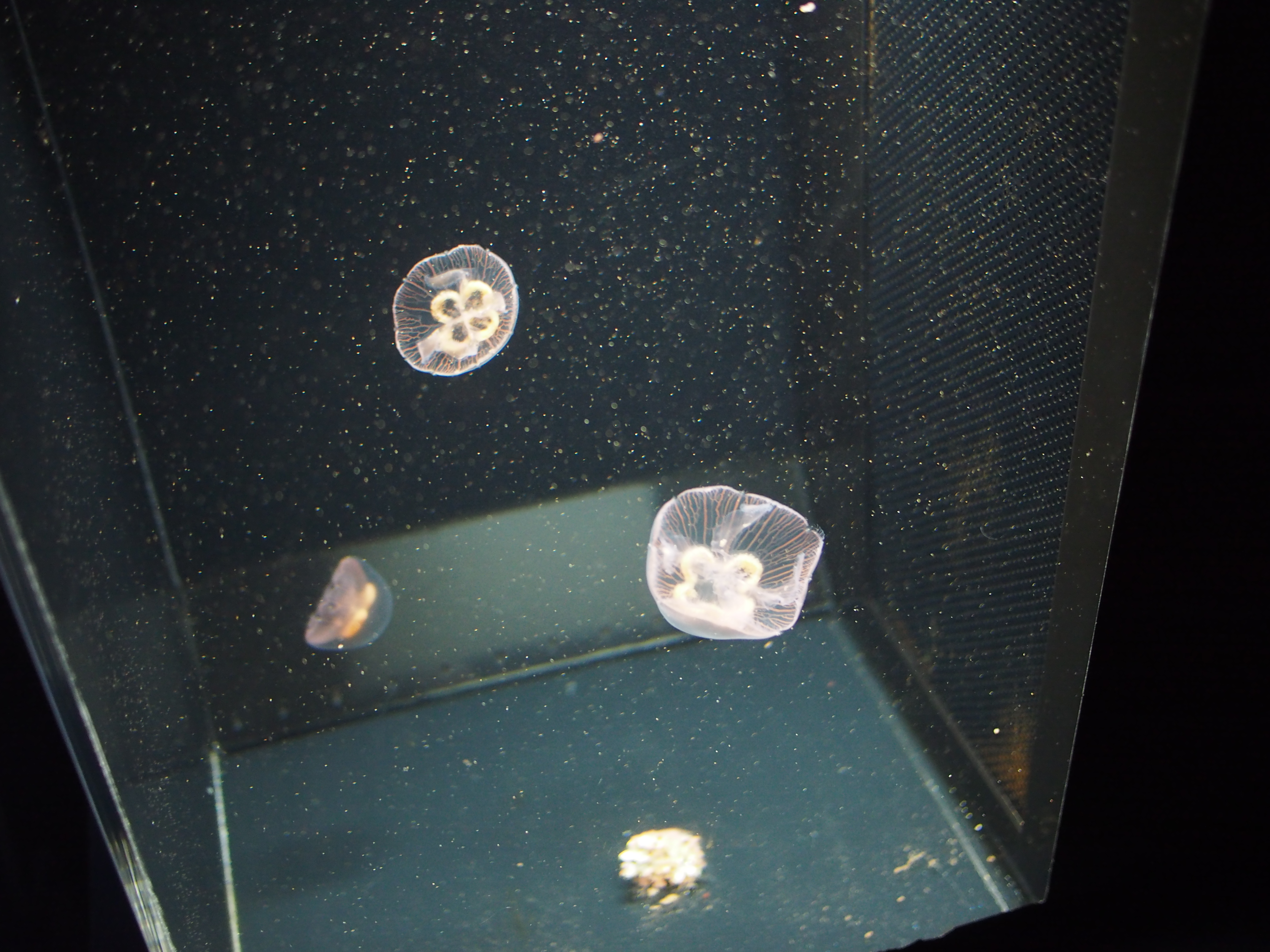

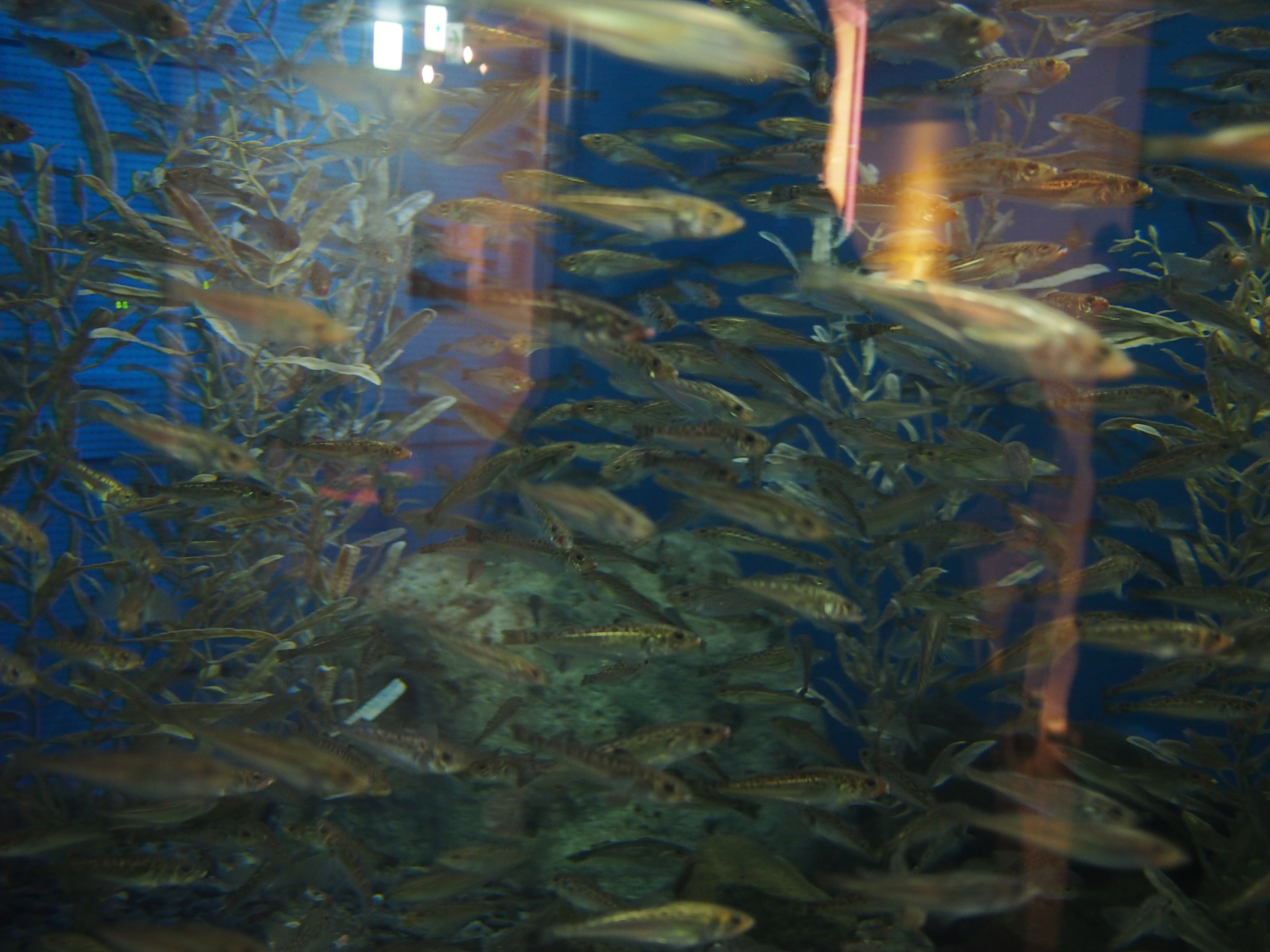
Japanese sandfish

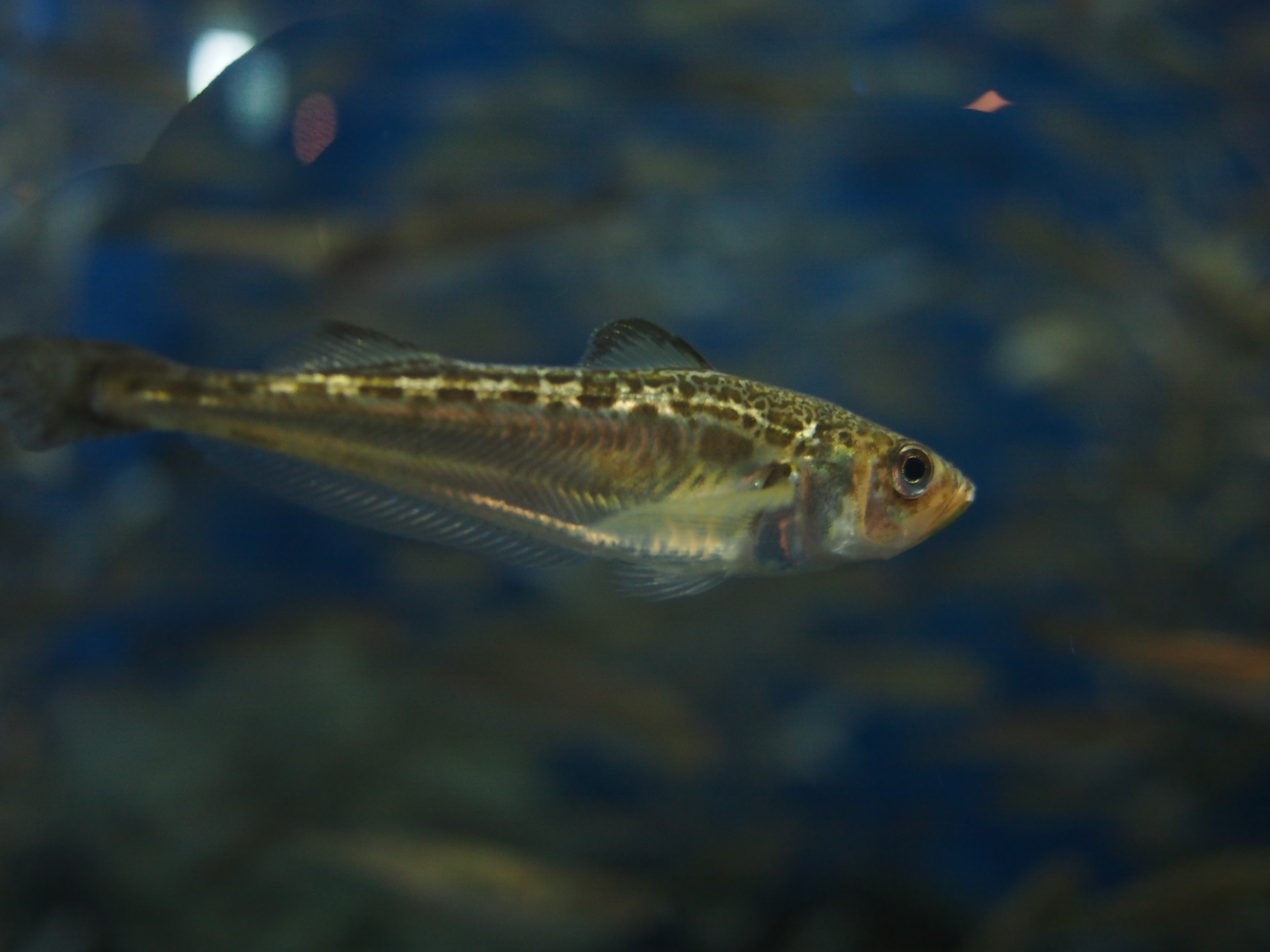
Hatahata, a prefectural fish

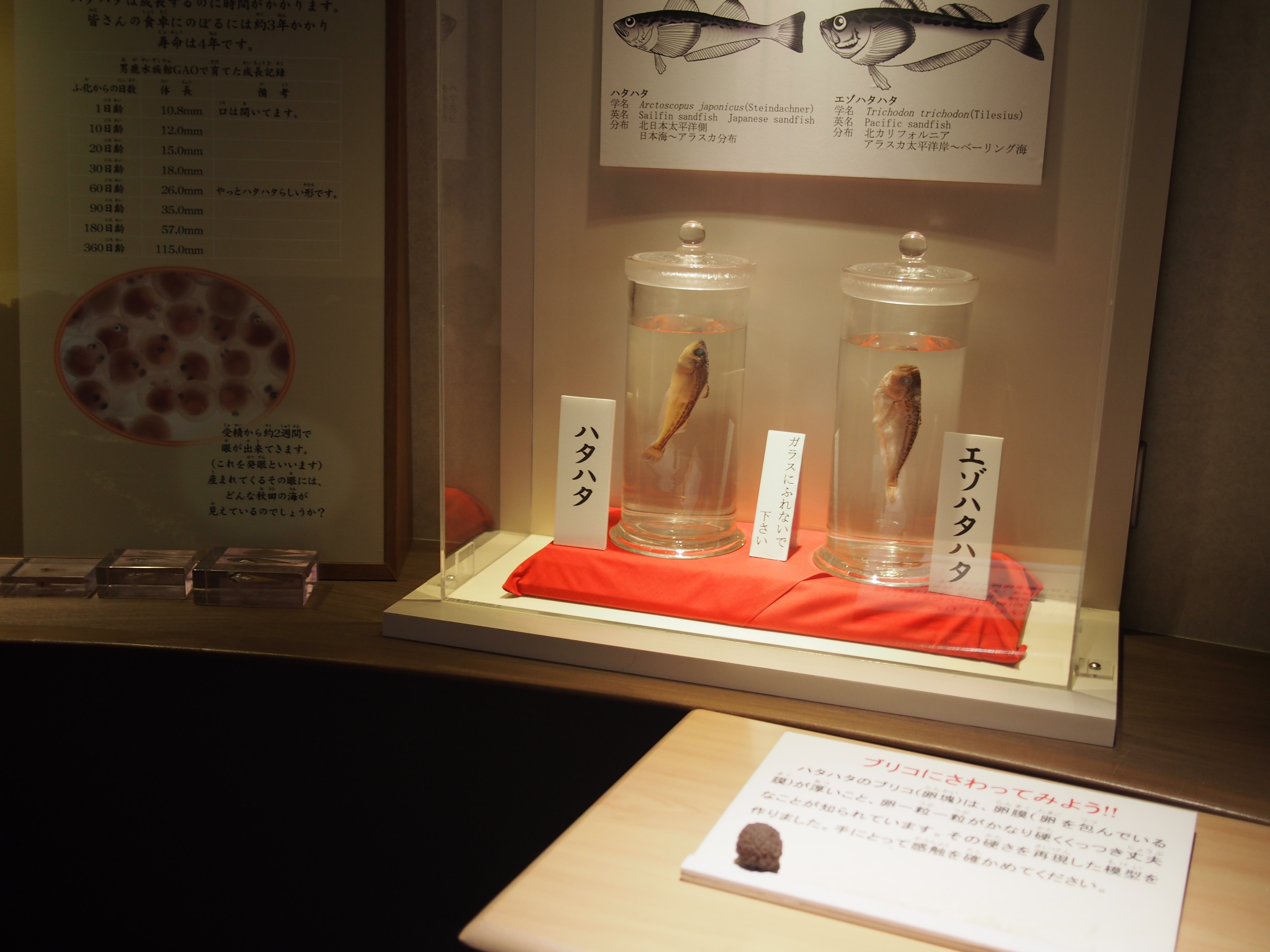
Pacific sandfish at Hatahata Museum

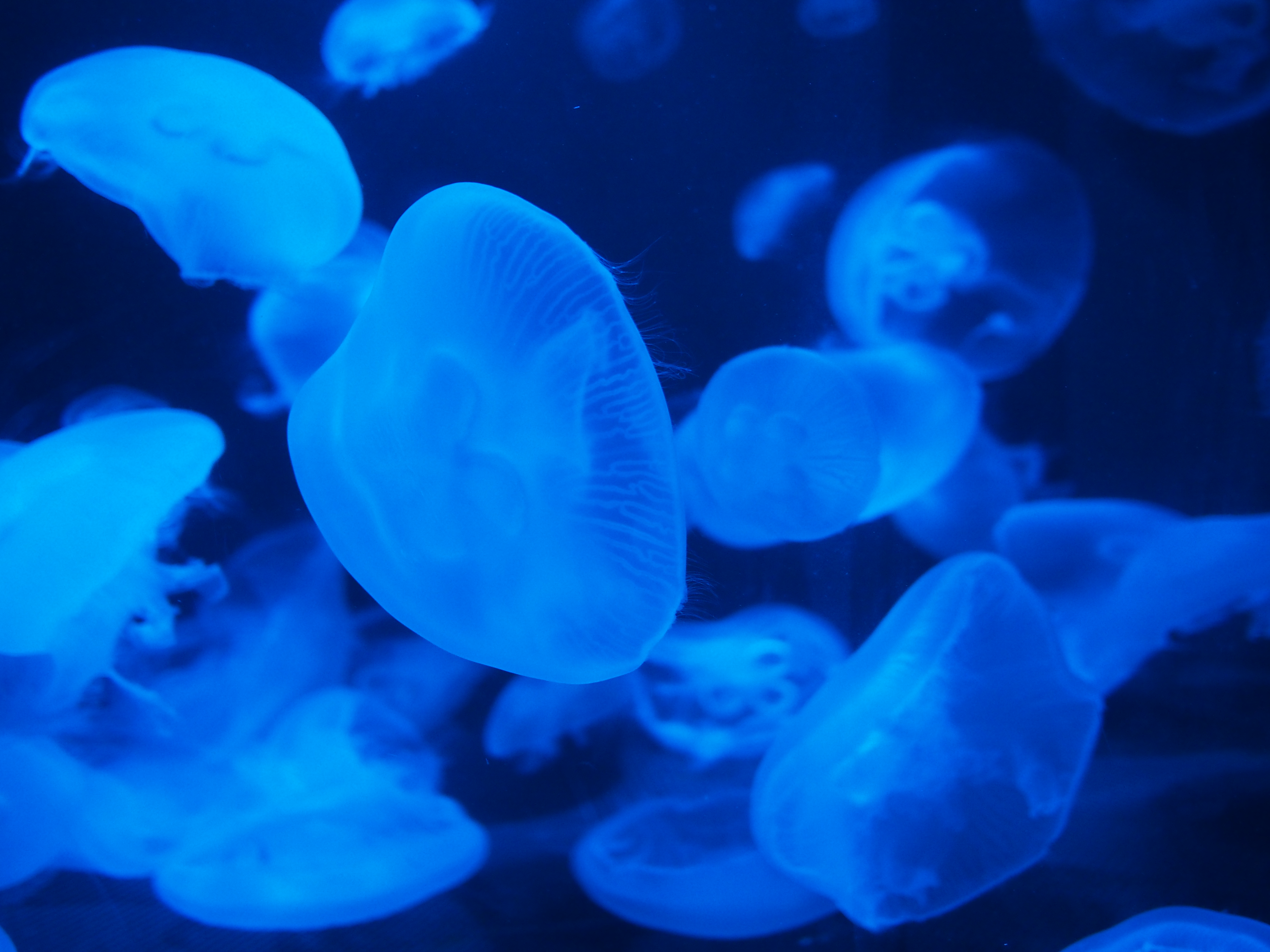

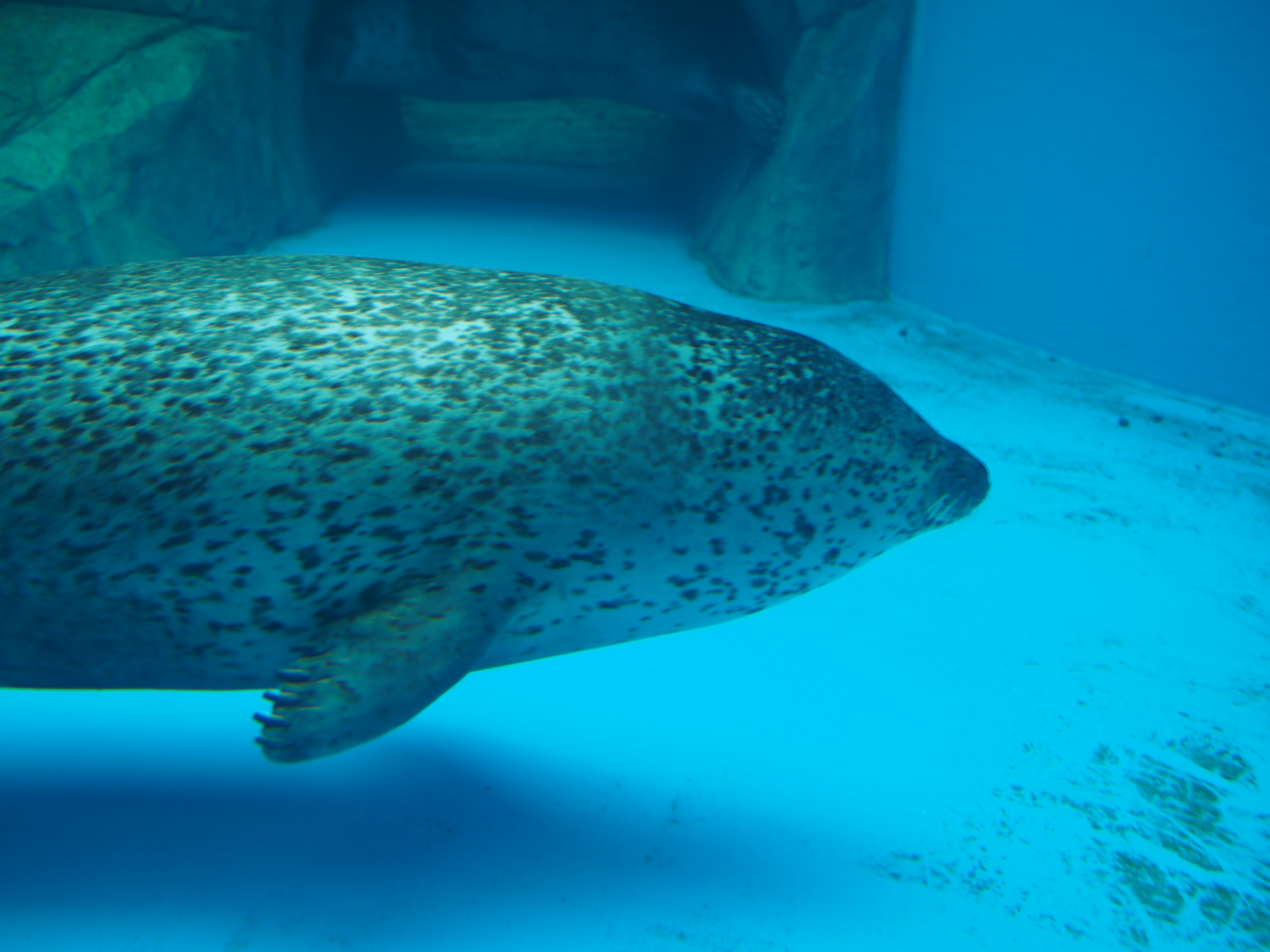
Spotted seal

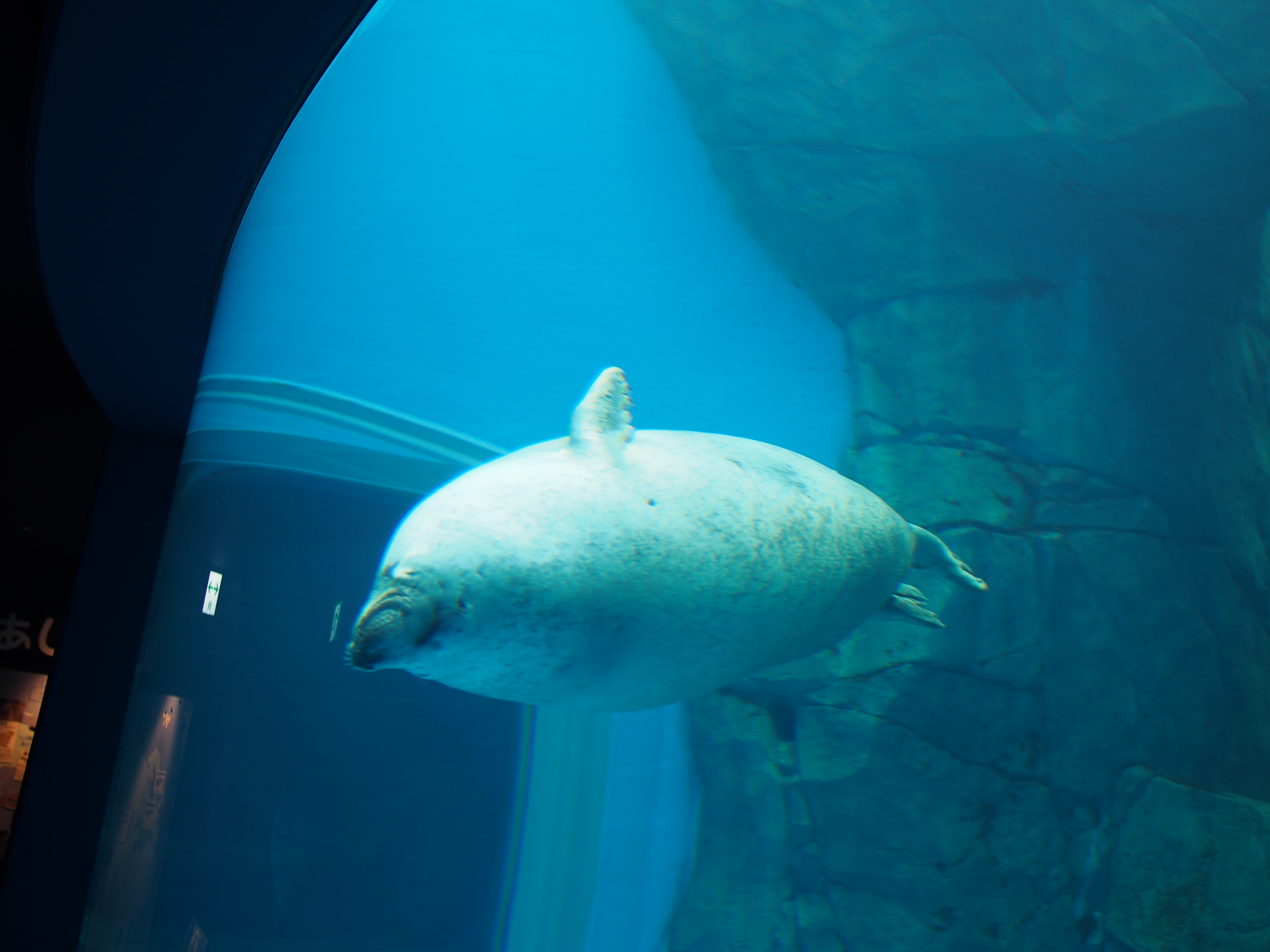

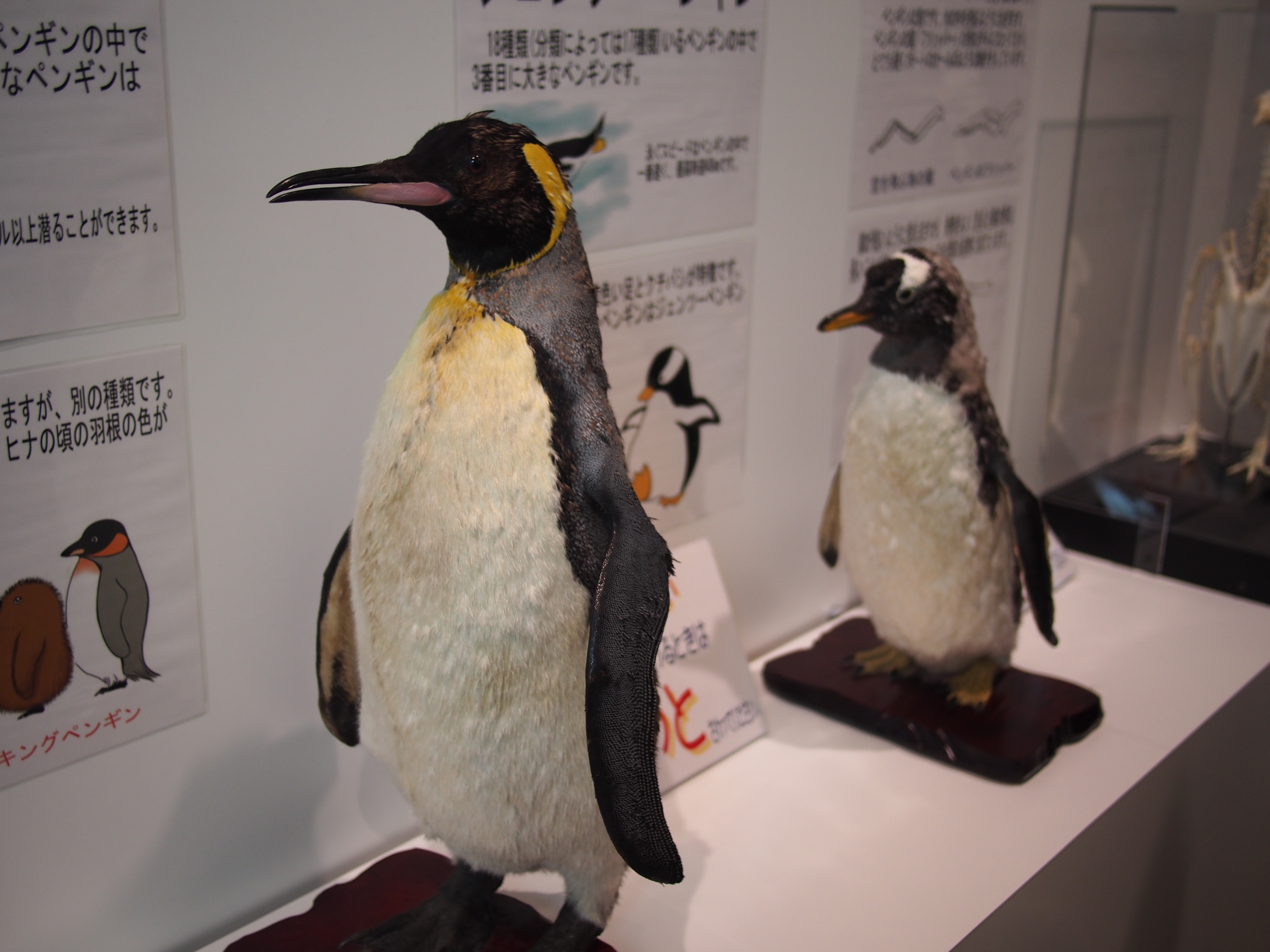

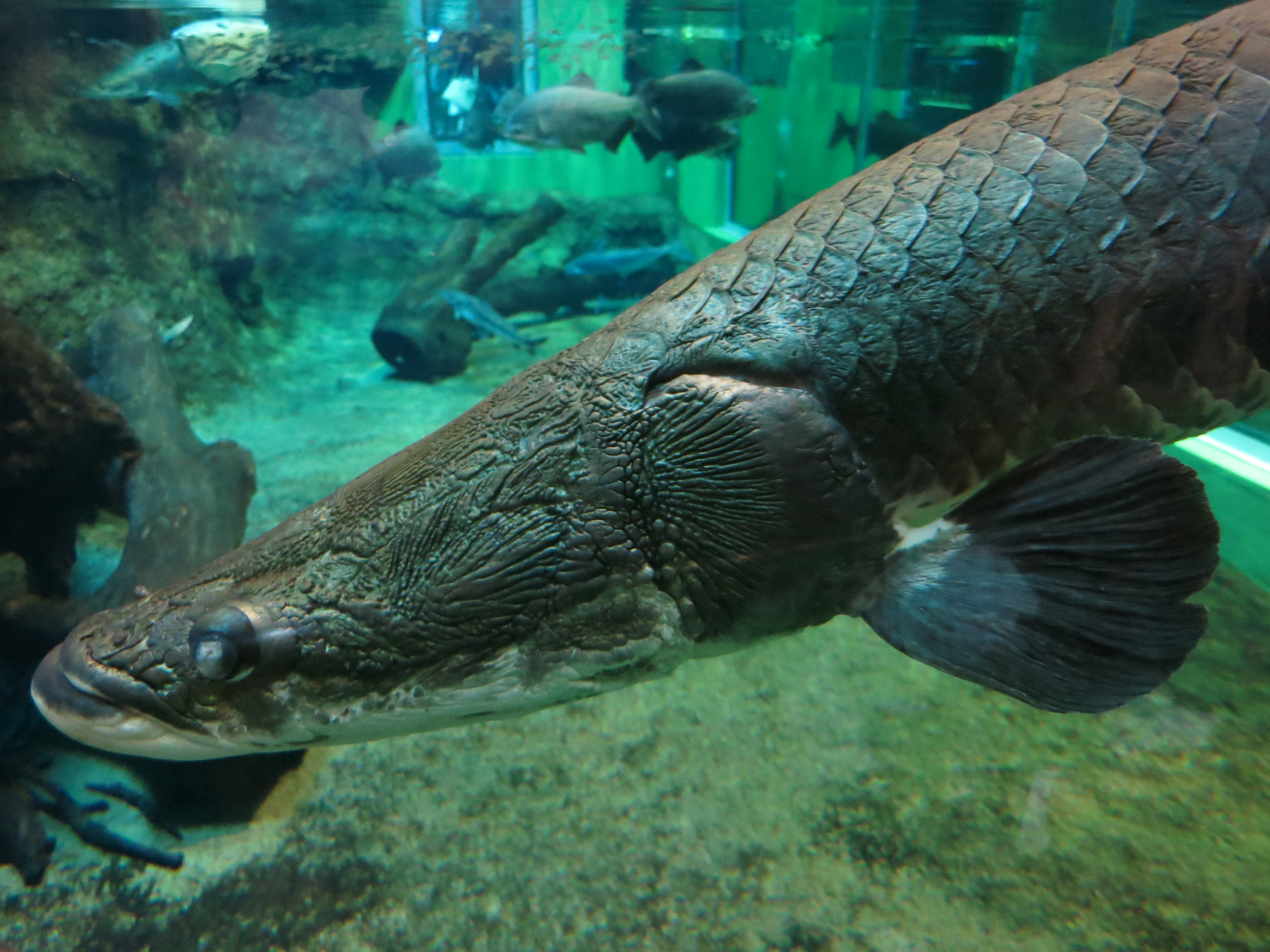
Pirarucu

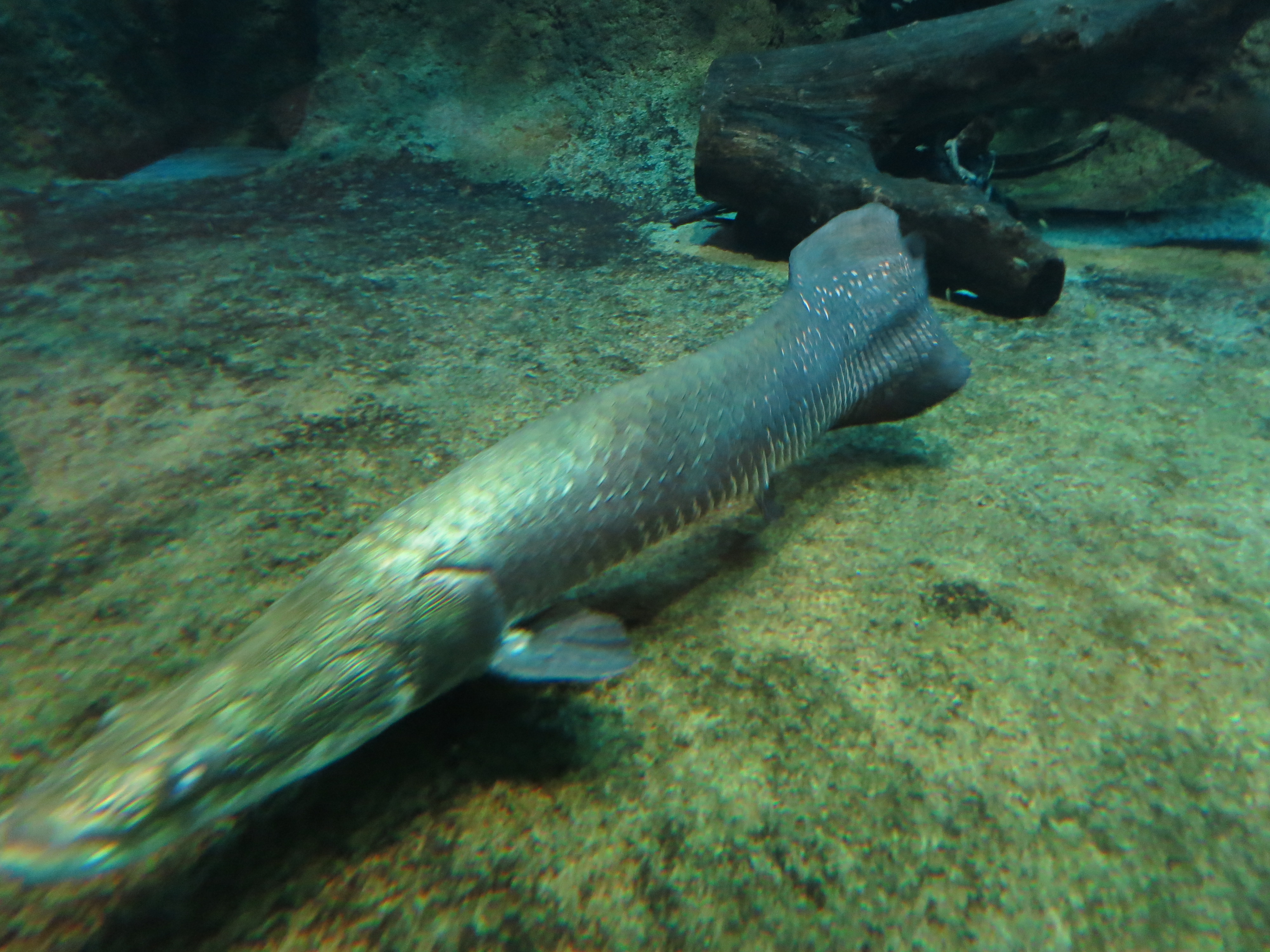

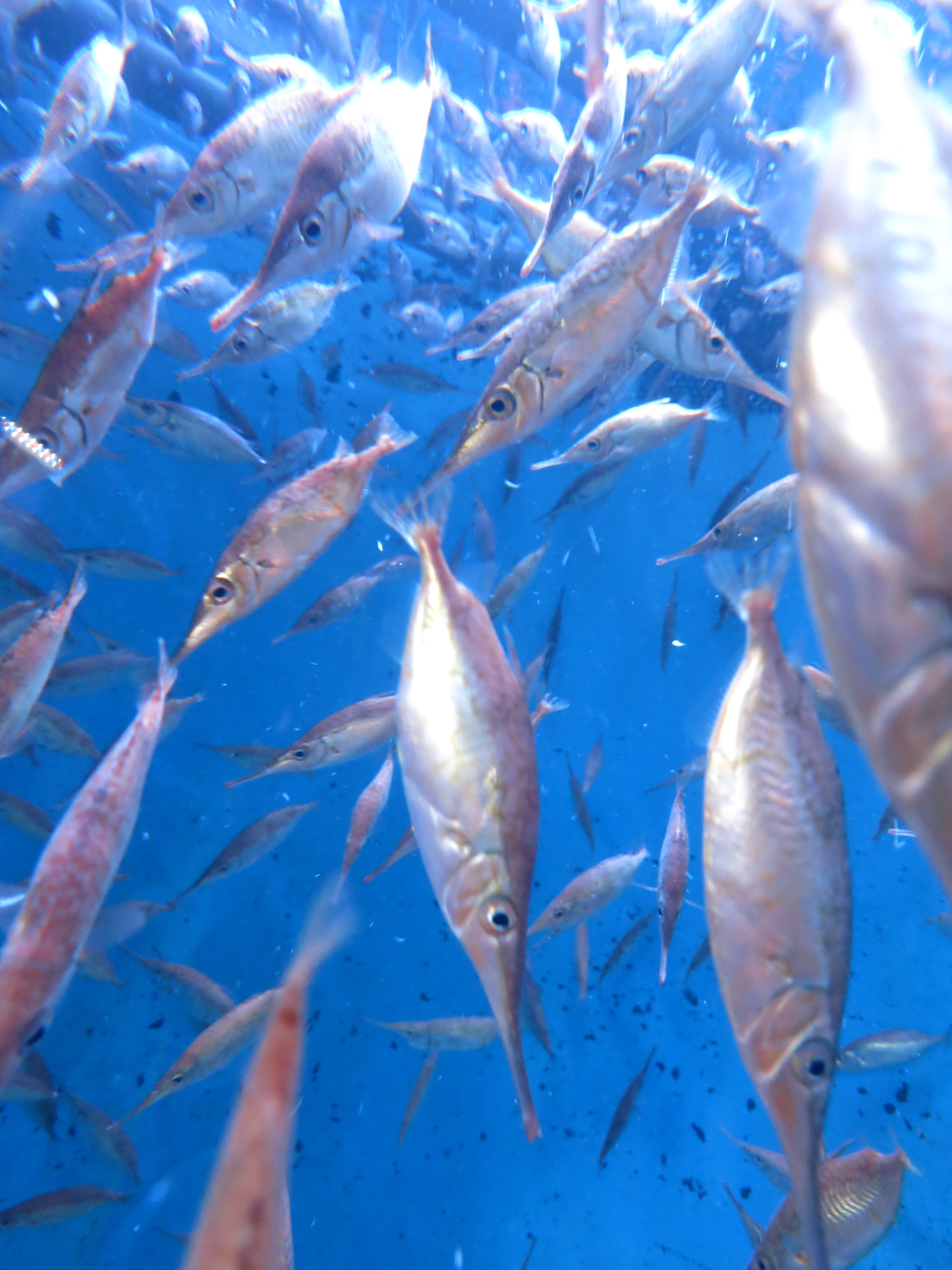
Longspine snipefish

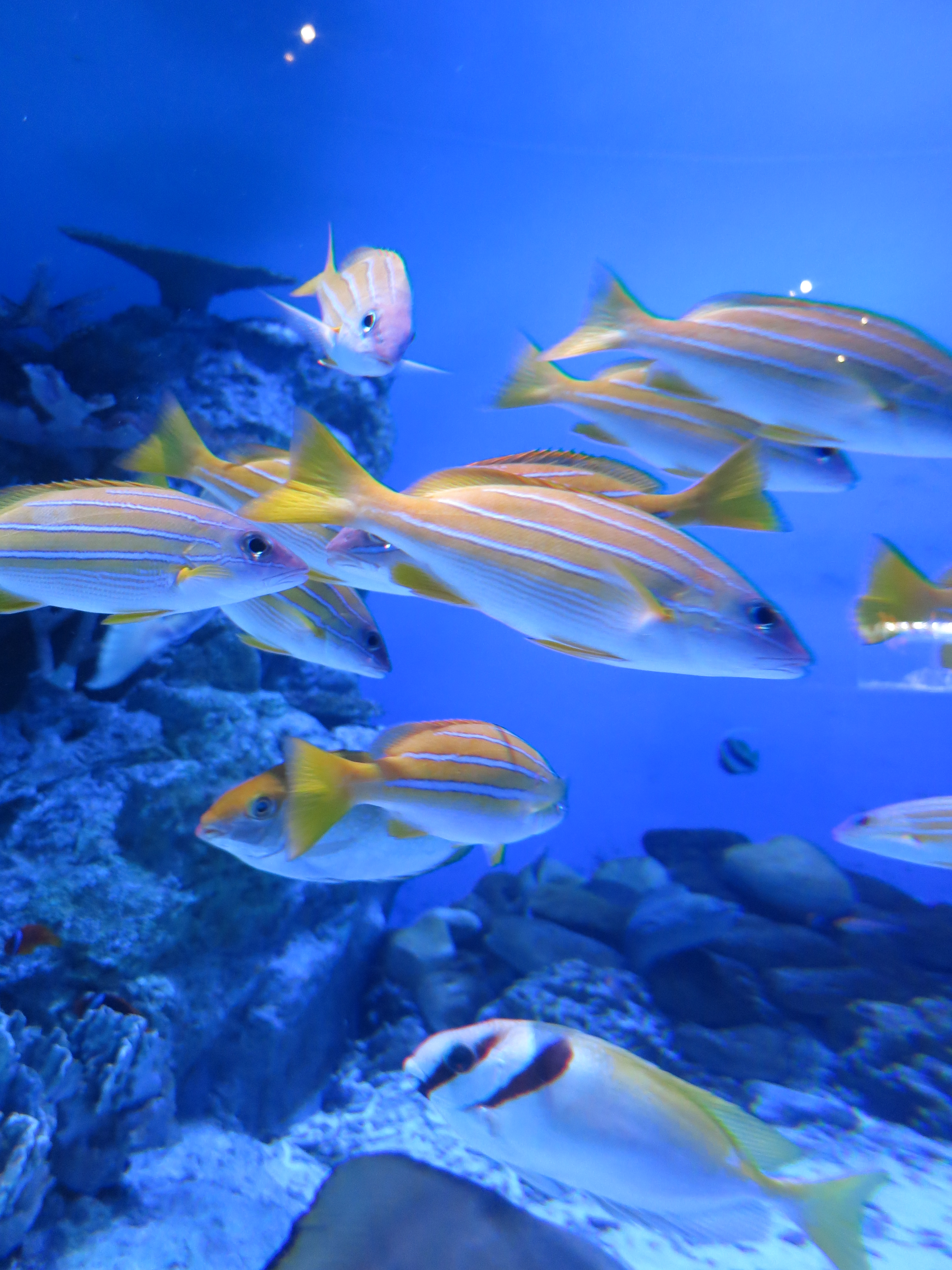
Bluestripe snapper

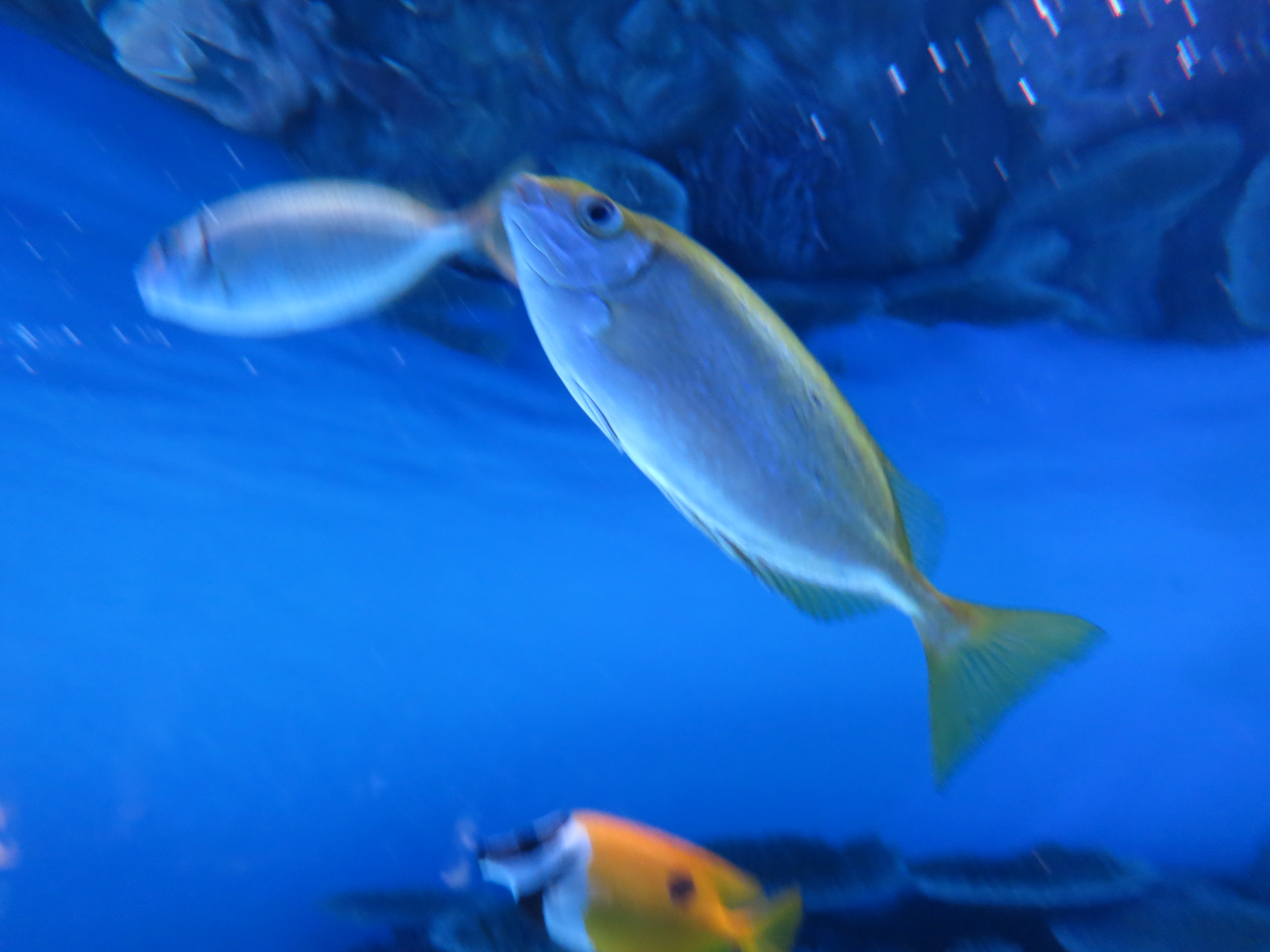

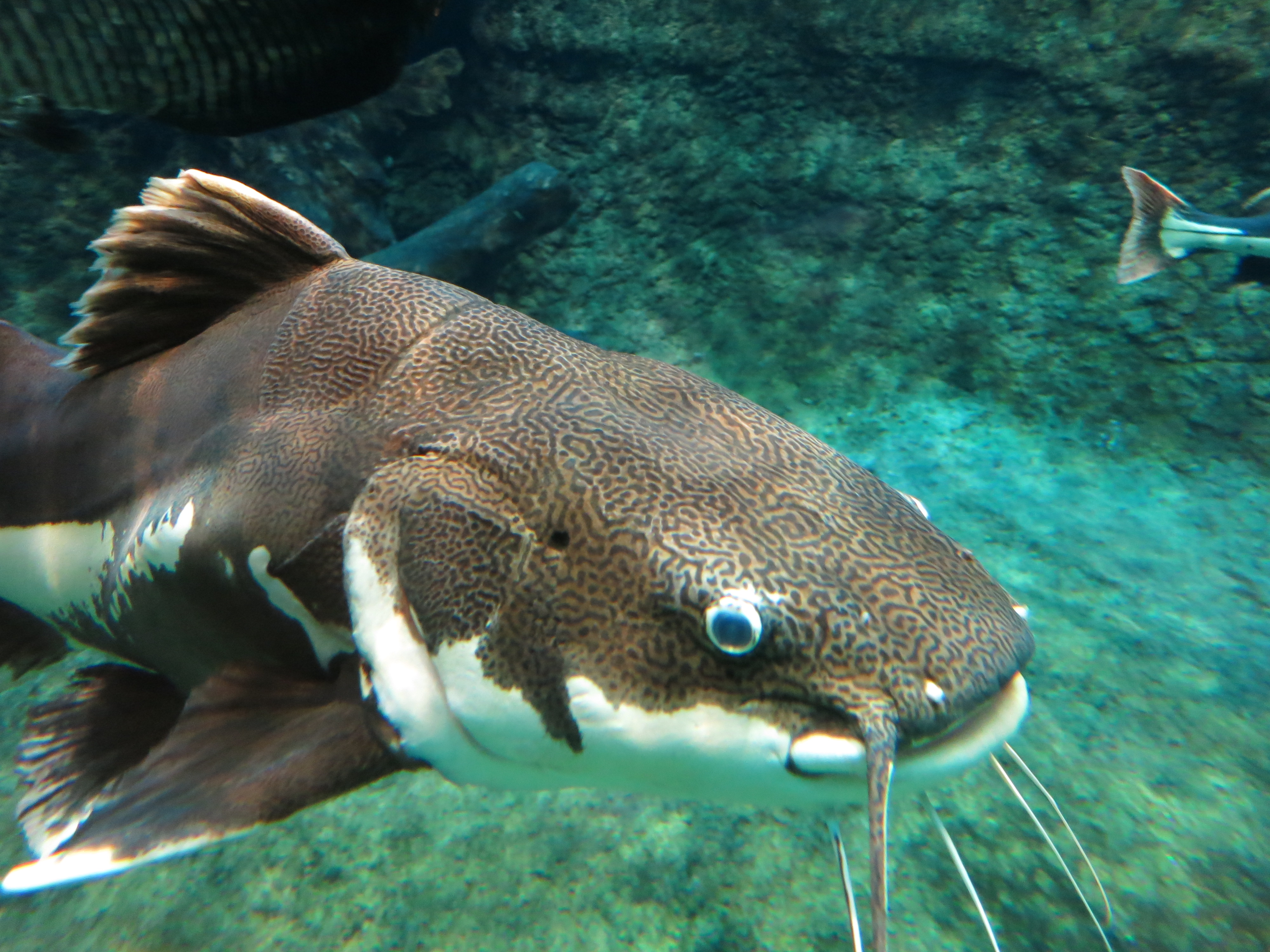
Redtail catfish

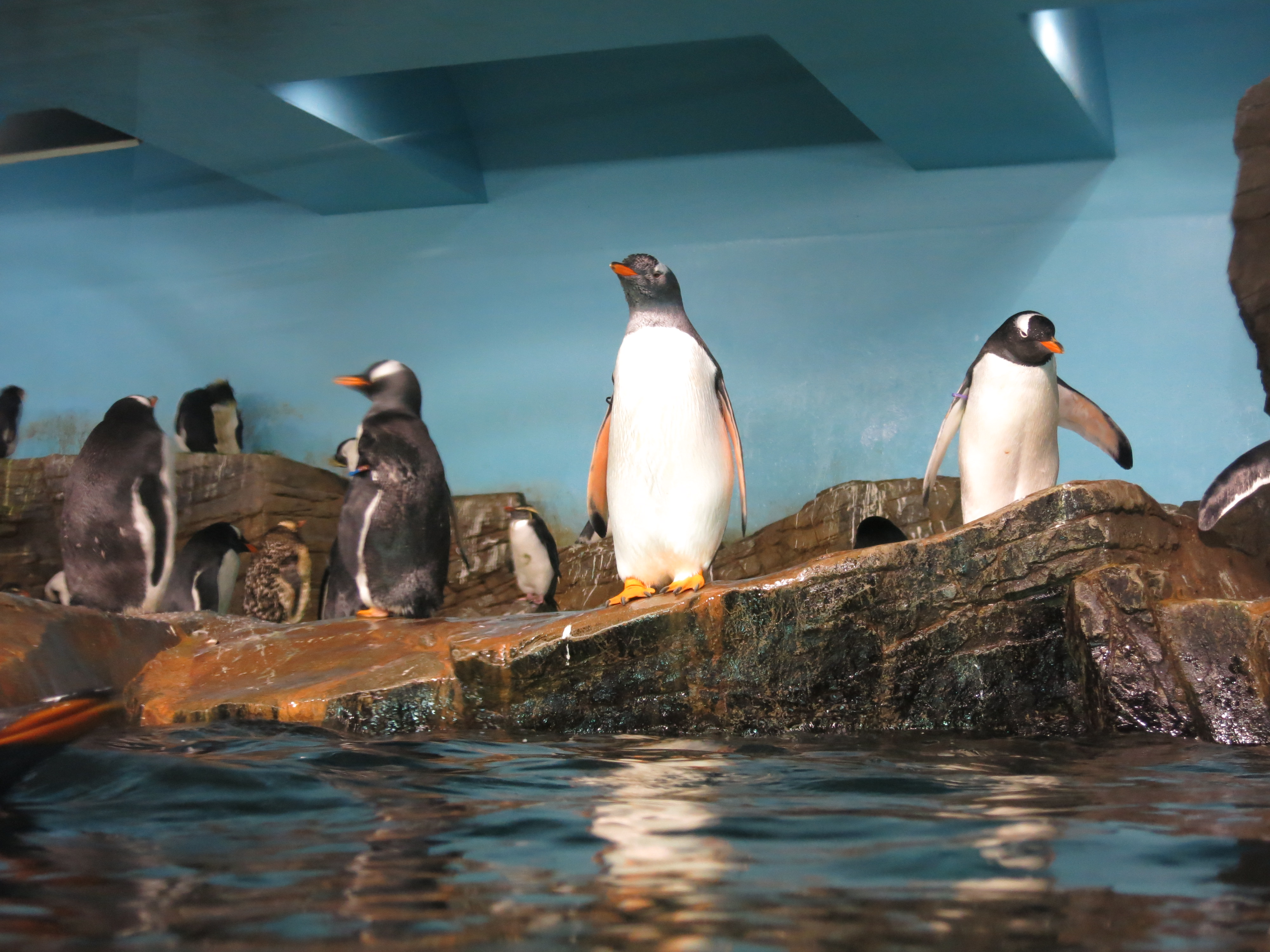
Gentoo penguins

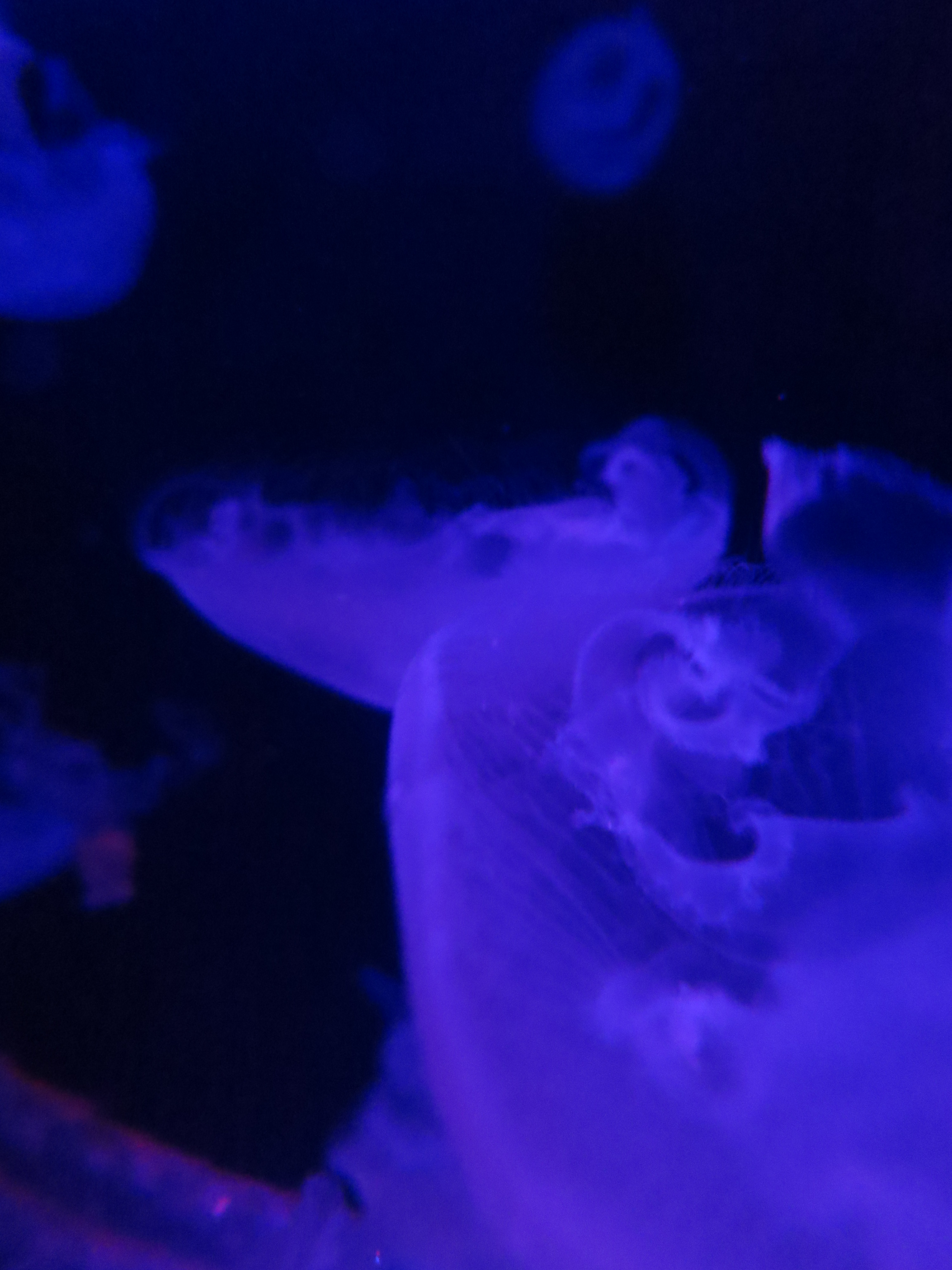
Common jellyfish

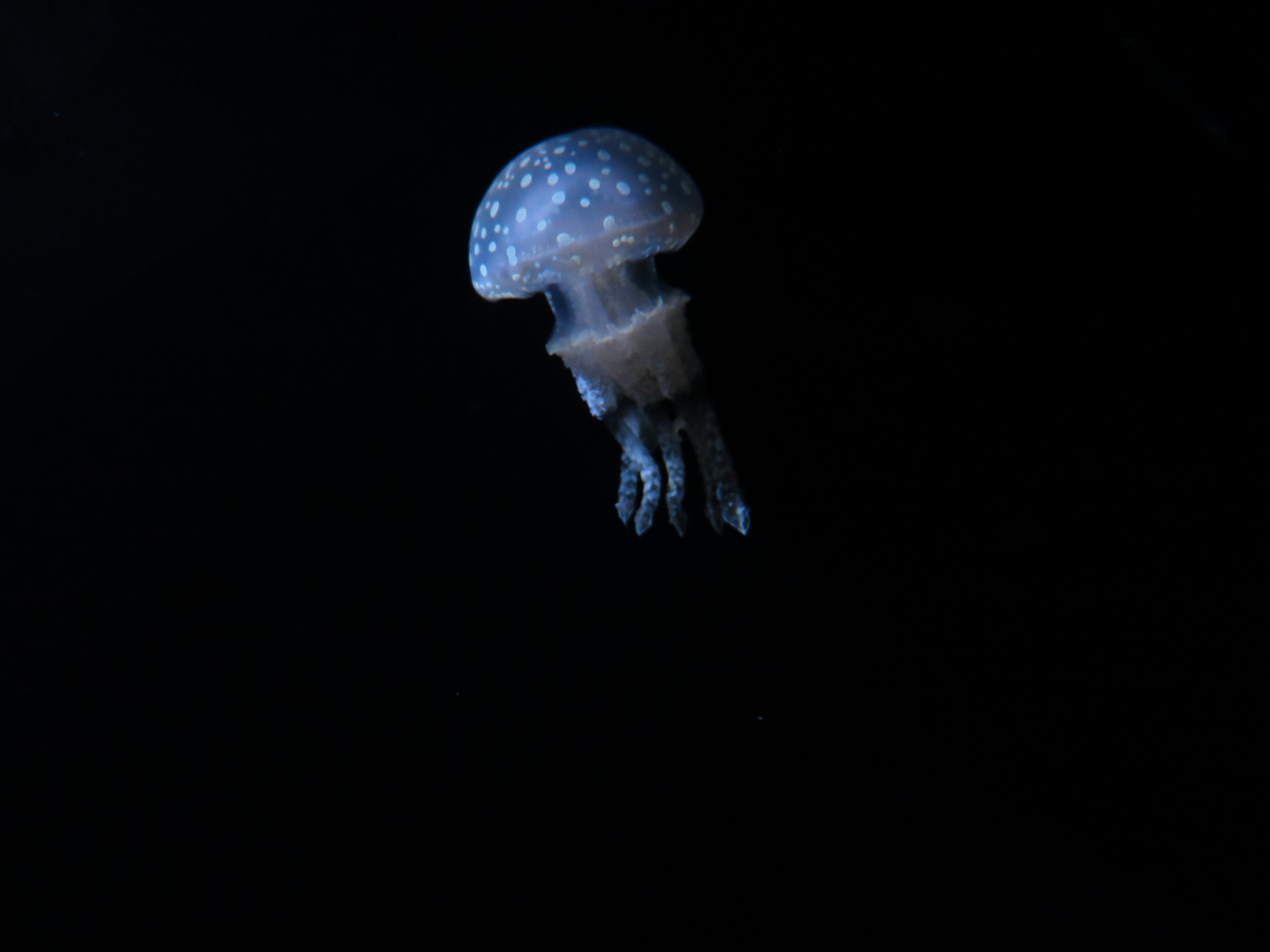
Spotted jelly

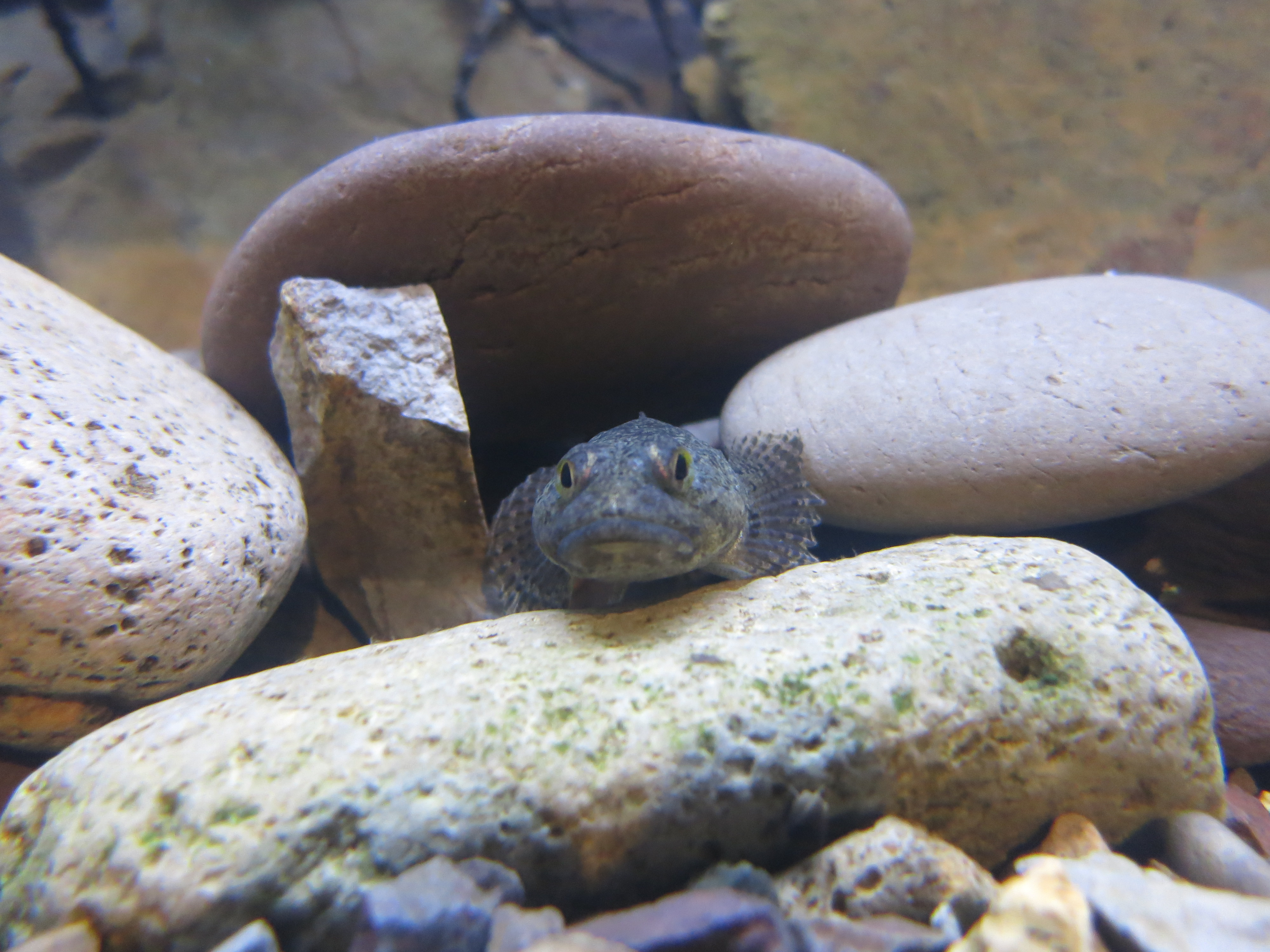

== Parking lot ==
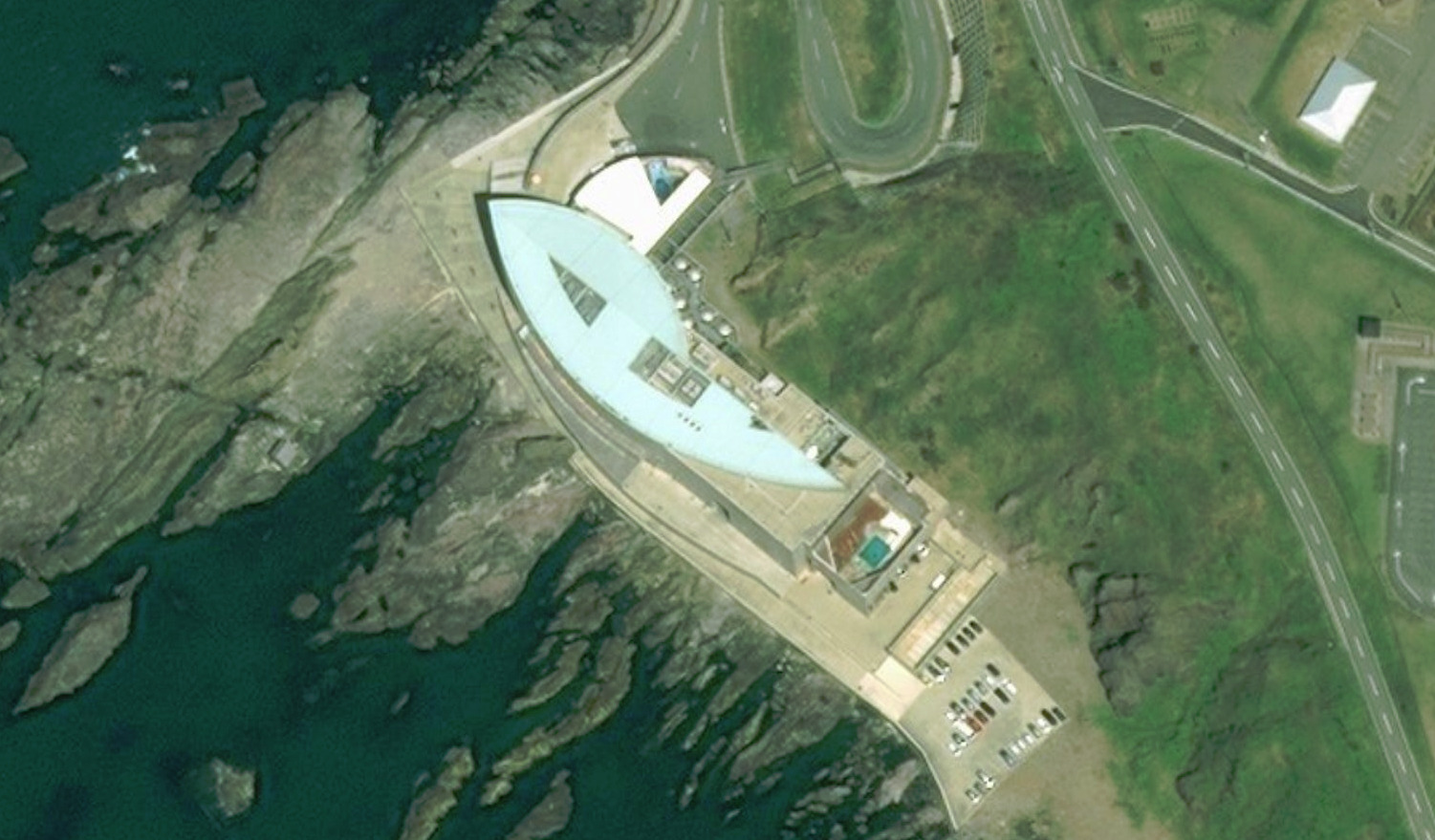
Satellite view

It can hold 630 cars and vehicles.

== See also ==
- Oga Quasi-National Park
- Nyūdōzaki Lighthouse
