= Iwasaki, Aomori =

Iwasaki 岩崎村
- Former municipality
- Flag Emblem

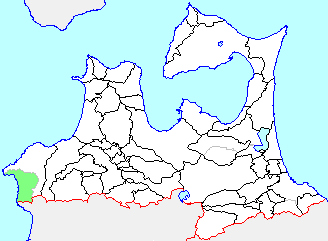
- Location of Iwasaki in Aomori Prefecture

- Location in Japan
- Coordinates: 40°34′54.8″N 139°55′35.5″E
- Country: Japan
- Region: Tōhoku
- Prefecture: Aomori Prefecture
- District: Nishitsugaru
- Merged: March 31, 2005 (now part of Fukaura)

Area
  - Total: 173.58 km^{2} (67.02 sq mi)

Population (February 1, 2005)
  - Total: 2,655
  - Density: 15.3/km^{2} (40/sq mi)
- Time zone: UTC+09:00 (JST)
- Symbols
- Bird: Common house martin
- Flower: Far East Amur adonis
- Tree: Maple

Iwasaki (岩崎村, Iwasaki-mura) was a village located in Nishitsugaru District in western Aomori Prefecture, Japan.

Iwasaki Village was located in the southwestern corner of Aomori Prefecture, facing the Sea of Japan. The area was part of Hirosaki Domain during the Edo period. After the Meiji Restoration, Iwasaki Village was created on April 1, 1889.

On March 31, 2005, Iwasaki was merged with the neighboring and expanded town of Fukaura, and thus no longer exists as an independent municipality.

At the time of its merger, Iwasaki had an estimated population of 2,655 and a population density of 15.3 persons per km^{2}. The total area was 173.58 km^{2}.

The village economy was dominated by commercial fishing and agriculture. The village was served Japan National Route 101 highway, and by Mutsu-Sawabe Station, Mutsu-Iwasaki Station, Jūniko Station, Matsukami Station, Shirakamidaketozanguchi Station and Ōmagoshi Station on the Gonō Line of JR East.

== Sister cities ==
- Ranua, Finland (since 1990)
