= Kitakanegasawa Station =

Railway station in Fukaura, Aomori Prefecture, Japan

Kitakanegasawa Station 北金ヶ沢駅
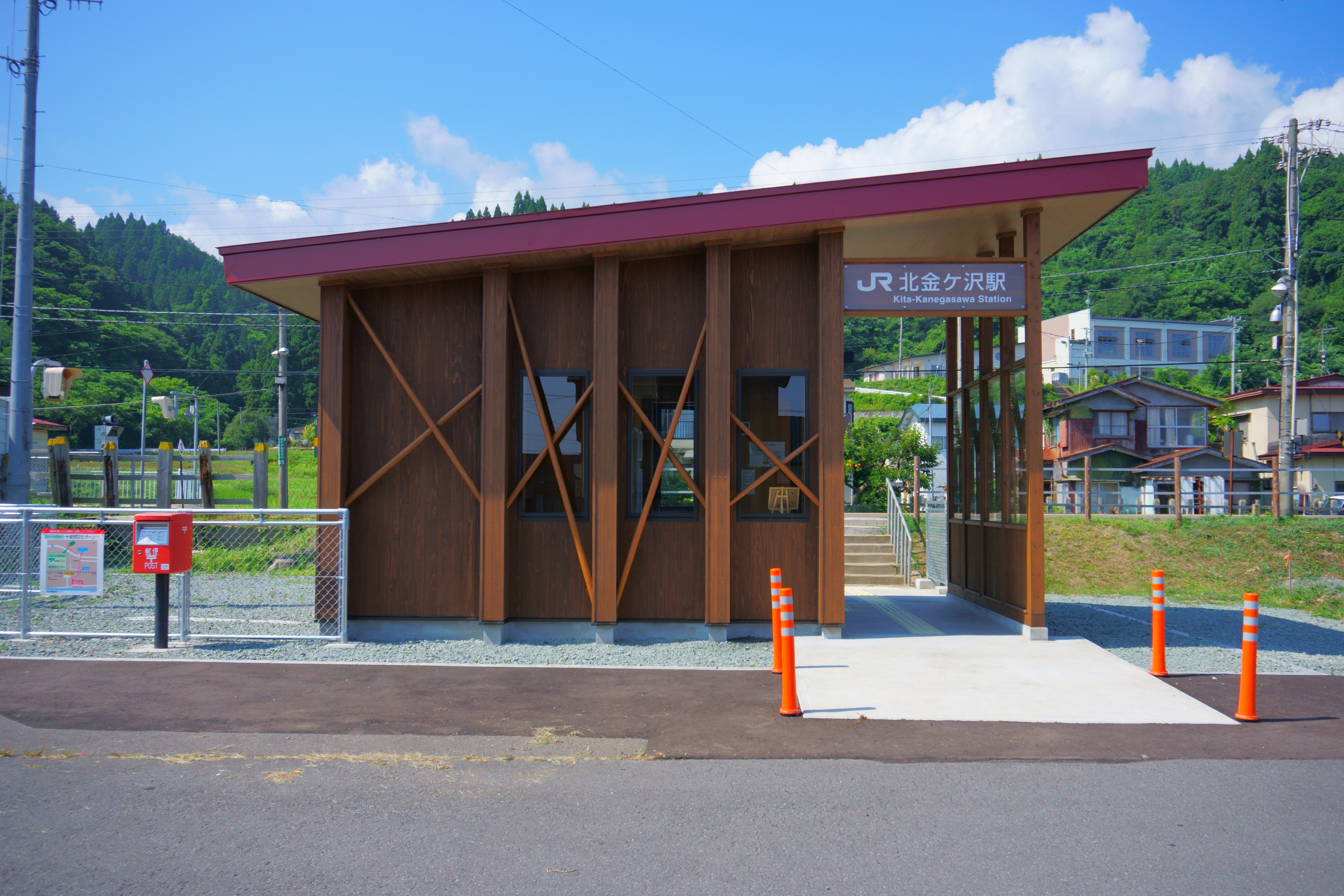
- Kitakanegasawa Station in July 2021

General information
- Location: Kitakanegasawa, Fukaura-machi, Nishitsugaru-gun, Aomori-ken 038-2504; Japan
- Coordinates: 40°44′46″N 140°05′42″E
- Operator: JR East
- Line: ■ Gonō Line
- Distance: 90.6 km from Higashi-Noshiro
- Platforms: 2 side platforms

Other information
- Status: Unstaffed
- Website: Official website (in Japanese)

History
- Opened: October 20, 1931

Services
Preceding station	JR East	Following station
Senjōjiki towards Higashi-Noshiro	Gonō Line Rapid	Ajigasawa One-way operation
Senjōjiki towards Higashi-Noshiro	Gonō Line Local	Mutsu-Yanagita towards Hirosaki
Location
- Location within Japan

Kitakanegasawa Station (北金ヶ沢駅, Kitakanegasawa-eki) is a railway station in the town of Fukaura, Aomori Prefecture, Japan, operated on the East Japan Railway Company (JR East).

== Lines ==
Kitakanegasawa Station is a station on the Gonō Line, and is located 90.6 kilometers from the terminus of the line at Higashi-Noshiro.

=== Platforms ===
1	■ Gonō Line	For Ajigasawa, Goshogawara and Hirosaki
2	■ Gonō Line	For Fukaura and Higashi-Noshiro

== Station layout ==
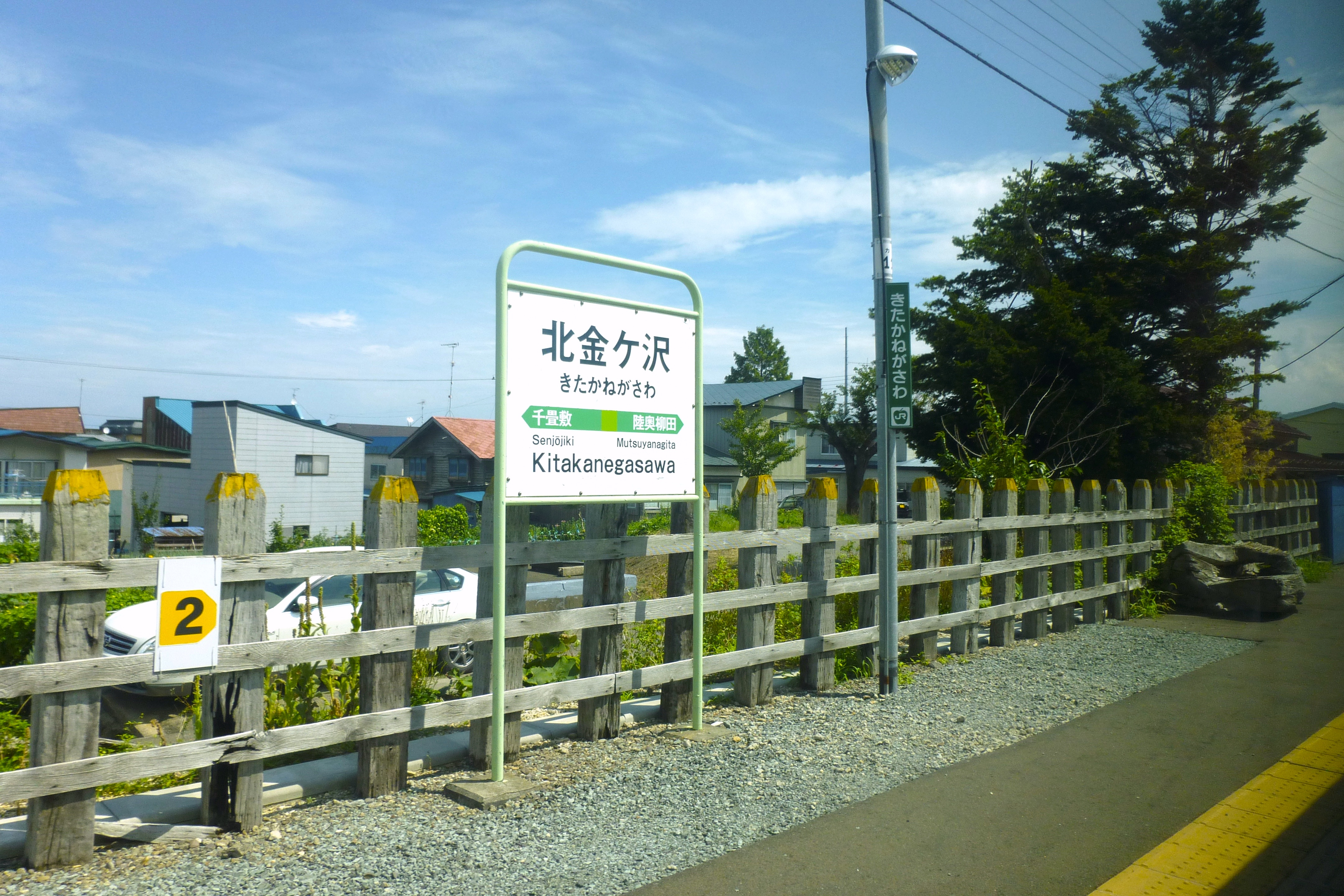
Station platform sign on a sunny day.

Kitakanegasawa Station has two ground-level opposed side platforms connected by a level crossing. The station is unattended and is managed from Goshogawara Station. The station is a kan'i itaku station, administered by Goshogawara Station, and operated by Fukaura municipal authority, with point-of-sales terminal installed. Ordinary tickets, express tickets, and reserved-seat tickets for all JR lines are on sale.

== History ==
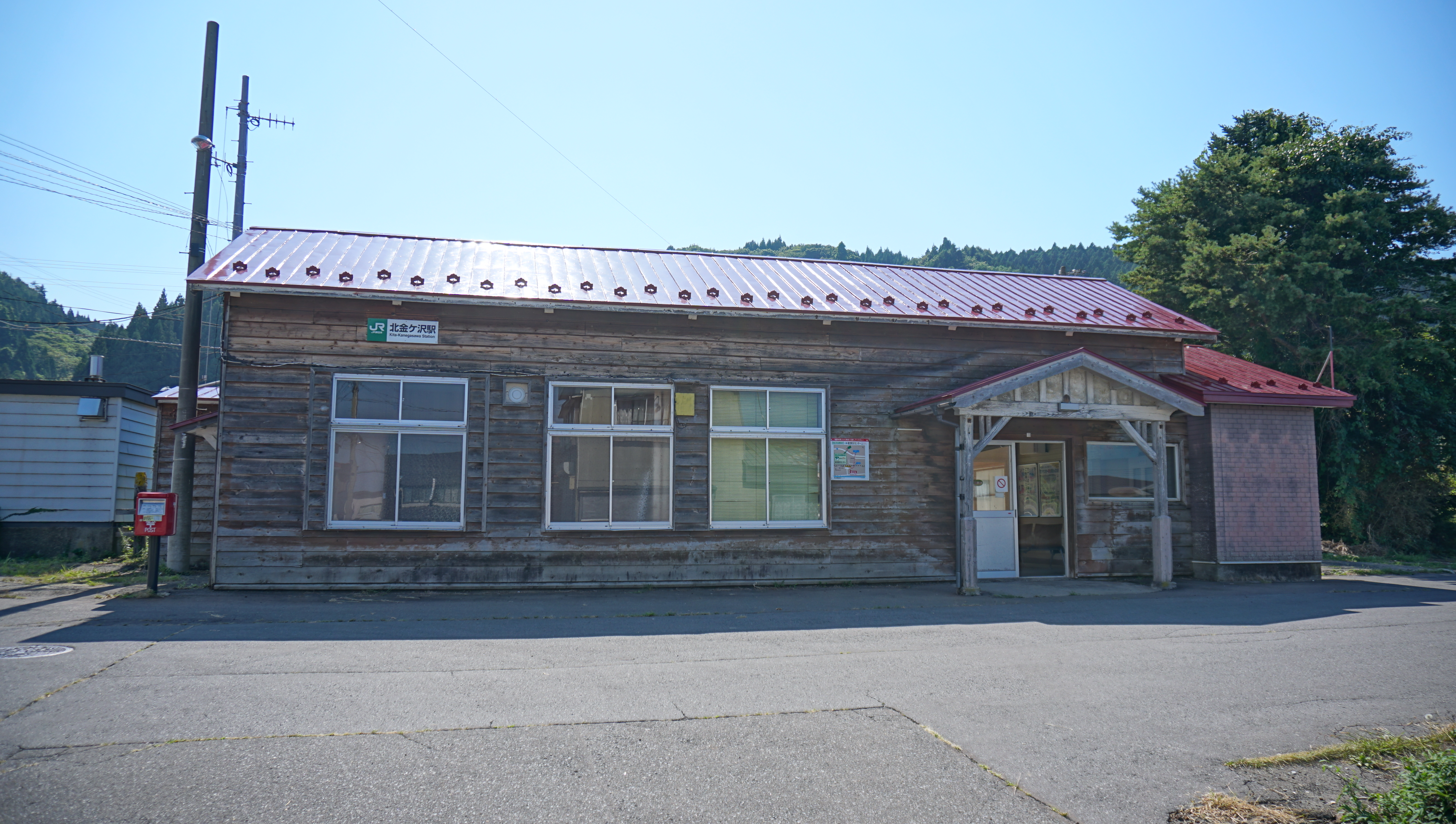
Formerly station building (photographed in Sep. 2019)

Kitakanegasawa Station was opened on October 20, 1931 as a station on the Japan National Railways (JNR). With the privatization of the JNR on April 1, 1987, it came under the operational control of JR East.

== Surrounding area ==
- National Route 101
- Fukaura Town office Ōdose branch office
- Kitakanegasawa Post office

== See also ==
- List of railway stations in Japan
