= Mutsu-Iwasaki Station =

Railway station in Fukaura, Aomori Prefecture, Japan

Mutsu-Iwasaki Station 陸奥岩崎駅
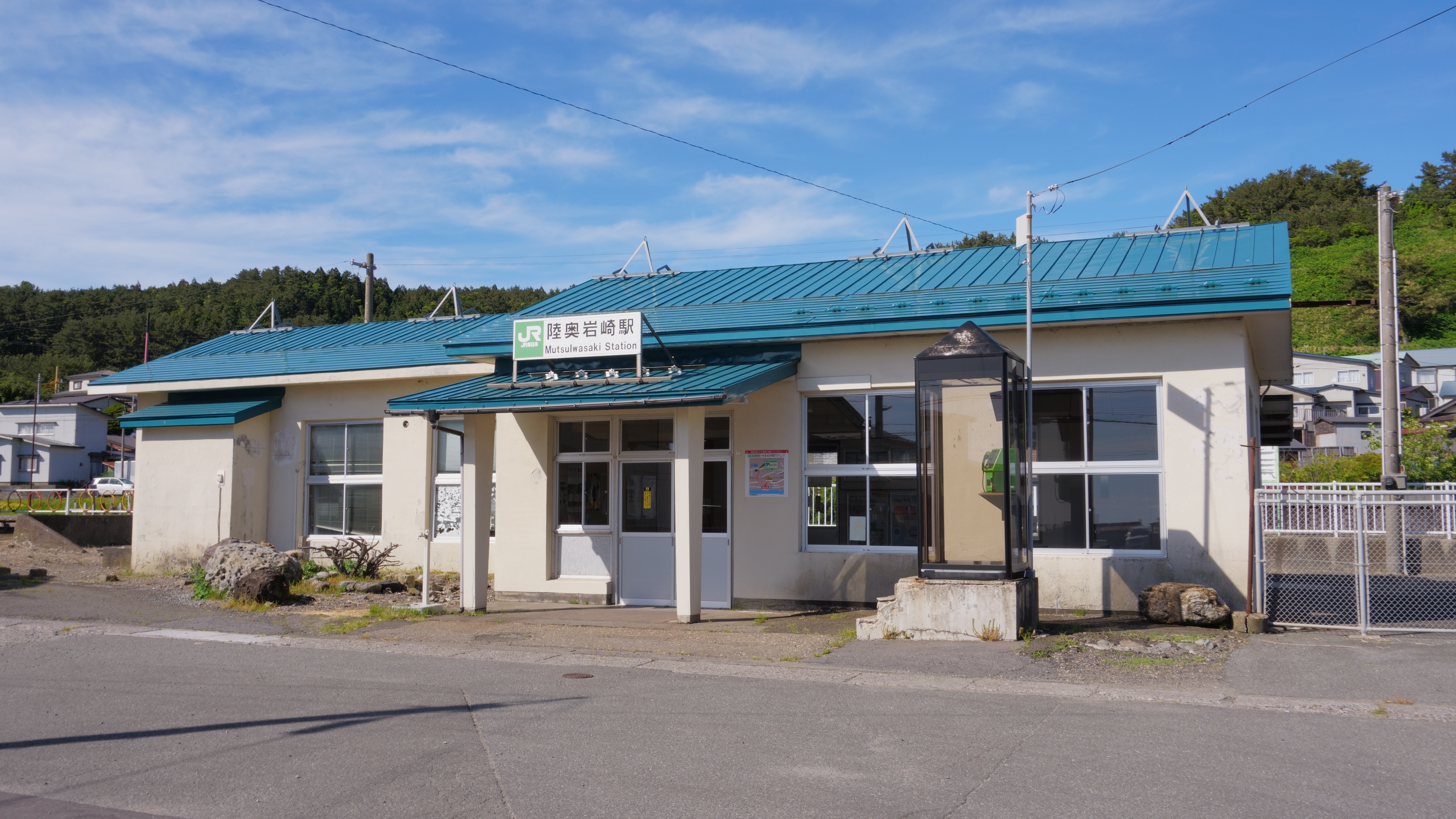
- Mutsu-Iwasaki Station in June 2023

General information
- Location: Iwasaki Matsubara 63, Fukaura-machi, Nishitsugaru-gun, Aomori-ken 038-2202; Japan
- Coordinates: 40°35′00.11″N 139°55′25.67″E
- Operator: JR East
- Line: ■ Gonō Line
- Distance: 50.9 km from Higashi-Noshiro
- Platforms: 1 side platform

Other information
- Status: Unstaffed
- Website: Official website (in Japanese)

History
- Opened: October 14, 1932

Services
Preceding station	JR East	Following station
Jūniko towards Higashi-Noshiro	Gonō Line Local	Mutsu-Sawabe towards Hirosaki
Location
- Location within Japan

Mutsu-Iwasaki Station (陸奥岩崎駅, Mutsu-Iwasaki-eki) is a railway station located in the town of Fukaura, Aomori Prefecture Japan, operated by the East Japan Railway Company (JR East).

== Lines ==
Mutsu-Iwasaki Station is a station on the Gonō Line, and is located 50.9 kilometers from the terminus of the line at Higashi-Noshiro.

== Station layout ==
Mutsu-Iwasaki Station has one ground-level side platform serving a single bi-directional track. The station built with double opposed side platforms, but only a single platform is currently in use; the other remains in-situ. The station is unattended, and is managed from Fukaura Station.

== History ==
Mutsu-Iwasaki Station was opened on October 14, 1932 as a station on the Japanese Government Railways (JGR). With the privatization of the Japanese National Railways (successor of JGR) on April 1, 1987, it came under the operational control of JR East.

== Surrounding area ==
- Iwasaki fishing port

== See also ==
- List of railway stations in Japan
