= Ōmagoshi Station =

Railway station in Fukaura, Aomori Prefecture, Japan

Ōmagoshi Station 大間越駅
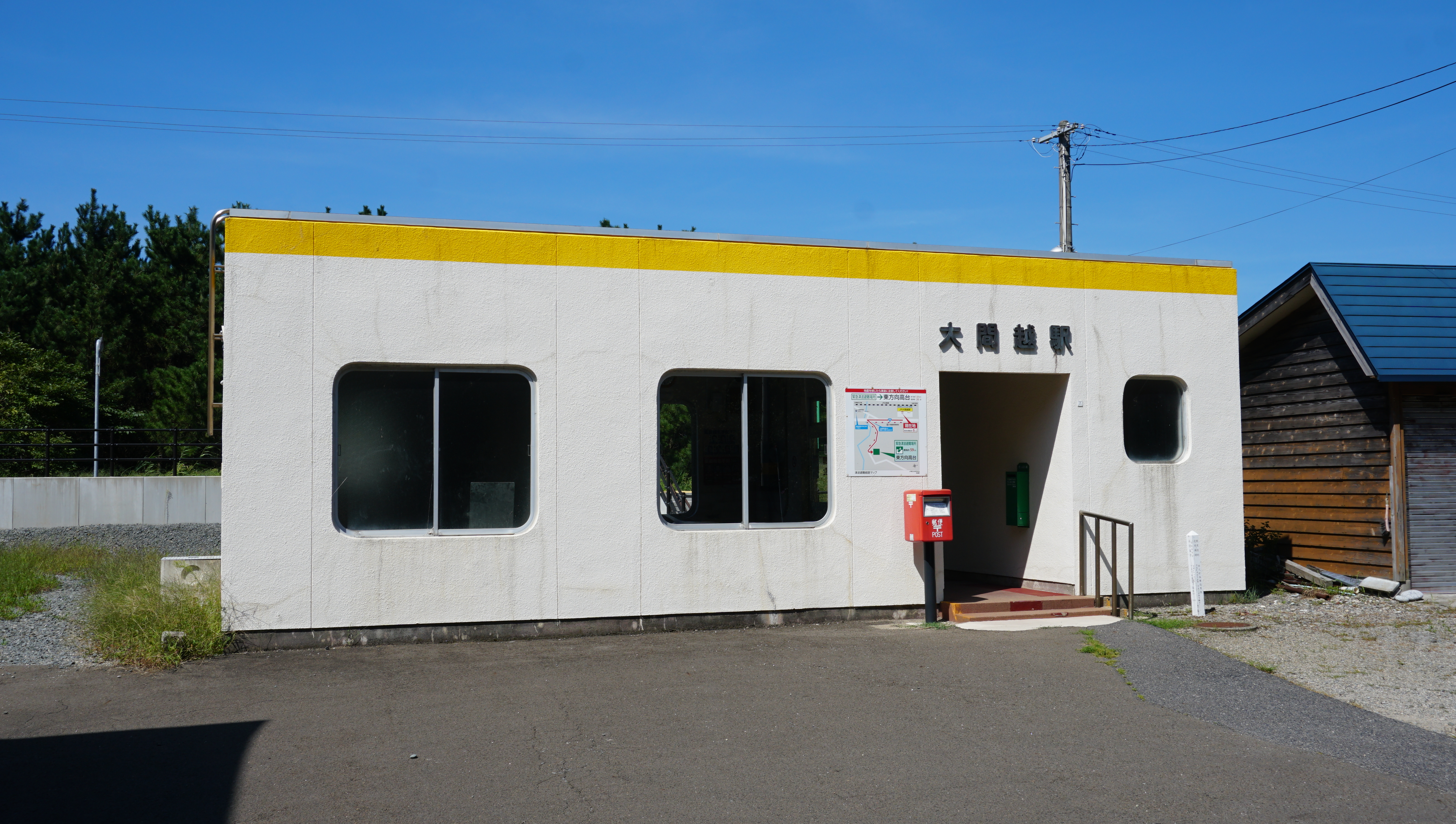
- Ōmagoshi Station in September 2019

General information
- Location: Ōmagoshi Miyazakihama 12, Fukaura-machi, Nishitsugaru-gun, Aomori-ken 038-2208; Japan
- Coordinates: 40°29′32.7″N 139°57′0.2″E
- Operator: JR East
- Line: ■ Gonō Line
- Distance: 39.9 km from Higashi-Noshiro
- Platforms: 1 side platform

Other information
- Status: Unstaffed
- Website: Official website (in Japanese)

History
- Opened: December 26, 1930

Services
Preceding station	JR East	Following station
Iwadate towards Higashi-Noshiro	Gonō Line Local	Shirakamidaketozanguchi towards Hirosaki
Location
- Location within Japan

Ōmagoshi Station (大間越駅, Ōmagoshi-eki) is a railway station in the town of Fukaura, Aomori Prefecture, Japan, operated by the East Japan Railway Company (JR East).

== Lines ==
Ōmagoshi Station is a station on the Gonō Line, and is 39.9 kilometres (24.8 mi) from the terminus of the line at Higashi-Noshiro.

== Station layout ==
Ōmagoshi Station has one ground-level side platform serving a single bi-directional track. The station is unattended and is managed from Fukaura Station. The station building is of identical design to that of Mutsu-Sawabe and Higashi-Hachimori.

== History ==
Ōmagoshi Station was opened on December 26, 1930, as a station on the Japanese Government Railways (JGR). With the privatization of the Japanese National Railways (the successor to the JGR) on April 1, 1987, it came under the operational control of JR East.

== Surrounding area ==
- National Route 101
- Shirakami-Sanchi

== See also ==
- List of railway stations in Japan
