= Narusawa Station =

Railway station in Ajigasawa, Aomori Prefecture, Japan

Narusawa Station 鳴沢駅
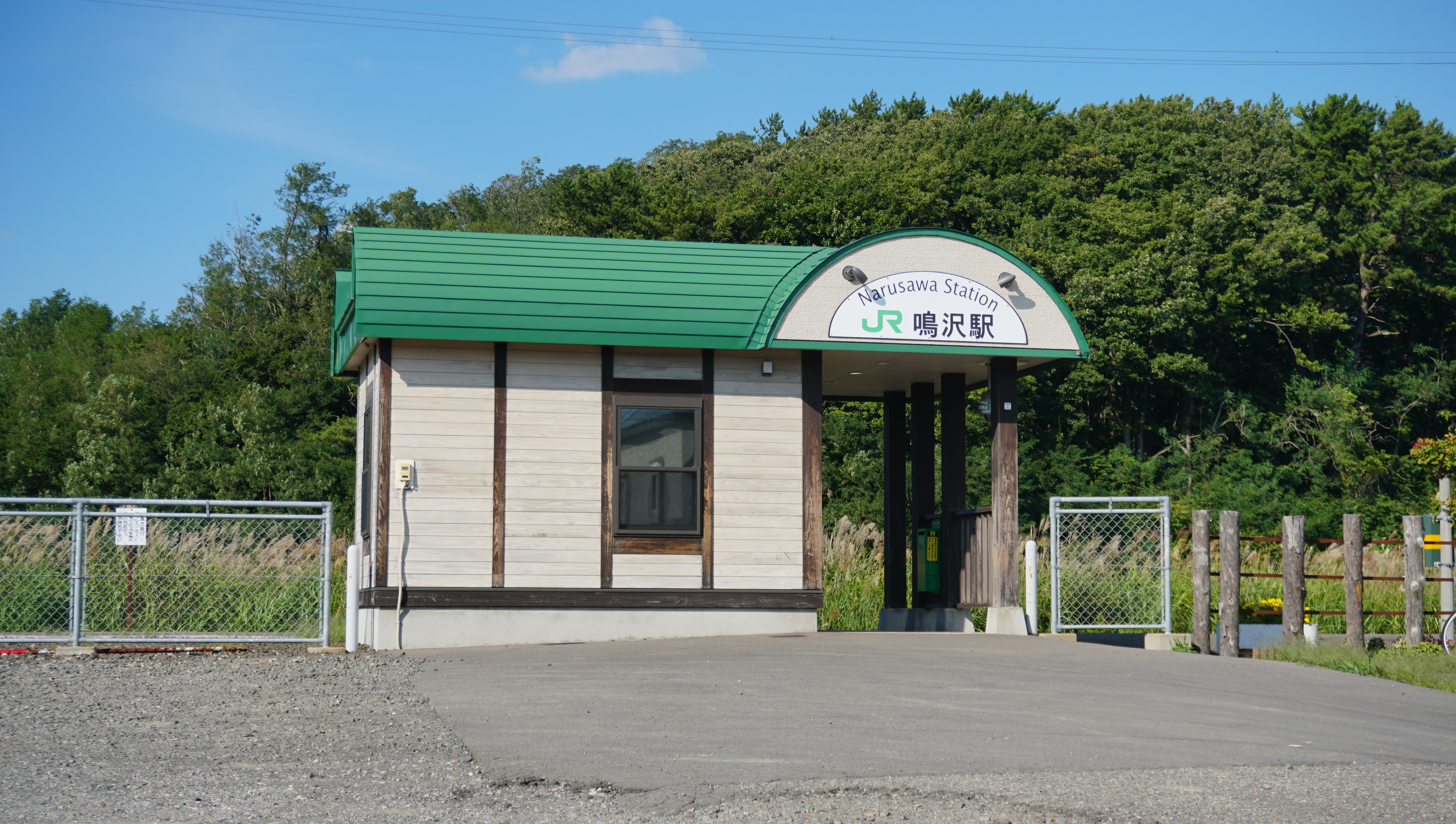
- Narusawa Station in September 2019

General information
- Location: Kitaukida, Ajigasawa-machi, Nishitsugaru-gun, Aomori-ken 038-2701; Japan
- Coordinates: 40°46′55.78″N 140°16′3.09″E
- Operator: JR East
- Line: ■ Gonō Line
- Distance: 108.3 km from Higashi-Noshiro
- Platforms: 1 side platform

Other information
- Status: Unstaffed
- Website: Official website (in Japanese)

History
- Opened: May 15, 1925

Services
Preceding station	JR East	Following station
Ajigasawa towards Higashi-Noshiro	Gonō Line Rapid	Koshimizu One-way operation
Ajigasawa towards Higashi-Noshiro	Gonō Line Local	Koshimizu towards Hirosaki
Location
- Location within Japan

Narusawa Station (鳴沢駅, Narusawa-eki) is a railway station located in the town of Ajigasawa, Aomori Prefecture Japan, operated by the East Japan Railway Company (JR East).

== Lines ==
Narusawa Station is a station on the Gonō Line, and is located 108.3 kilometers from the terminus of the line at Higashi-Noshiro.

== Station layout ==
Narusawa Station has one ground-level side platform serving a single bi-directional track. The station is unattended.

== History ==
Narusawa Station was opened on May 15, 1925 as a station on the Japan National Railways (JNR). With the privatization of the JNR on April 1, 1987, it came under the operational control of JR East. A new station building was completed in August 2012.

== Surrounding area ==
- Narusawa Post Office

== See also ==
- List of railway stations in Japan
