= Senjōjiki Station =

Railway station in Fukaura, Aomori Prefecture, Japan

Senjōjiki Station 千畳敷駅
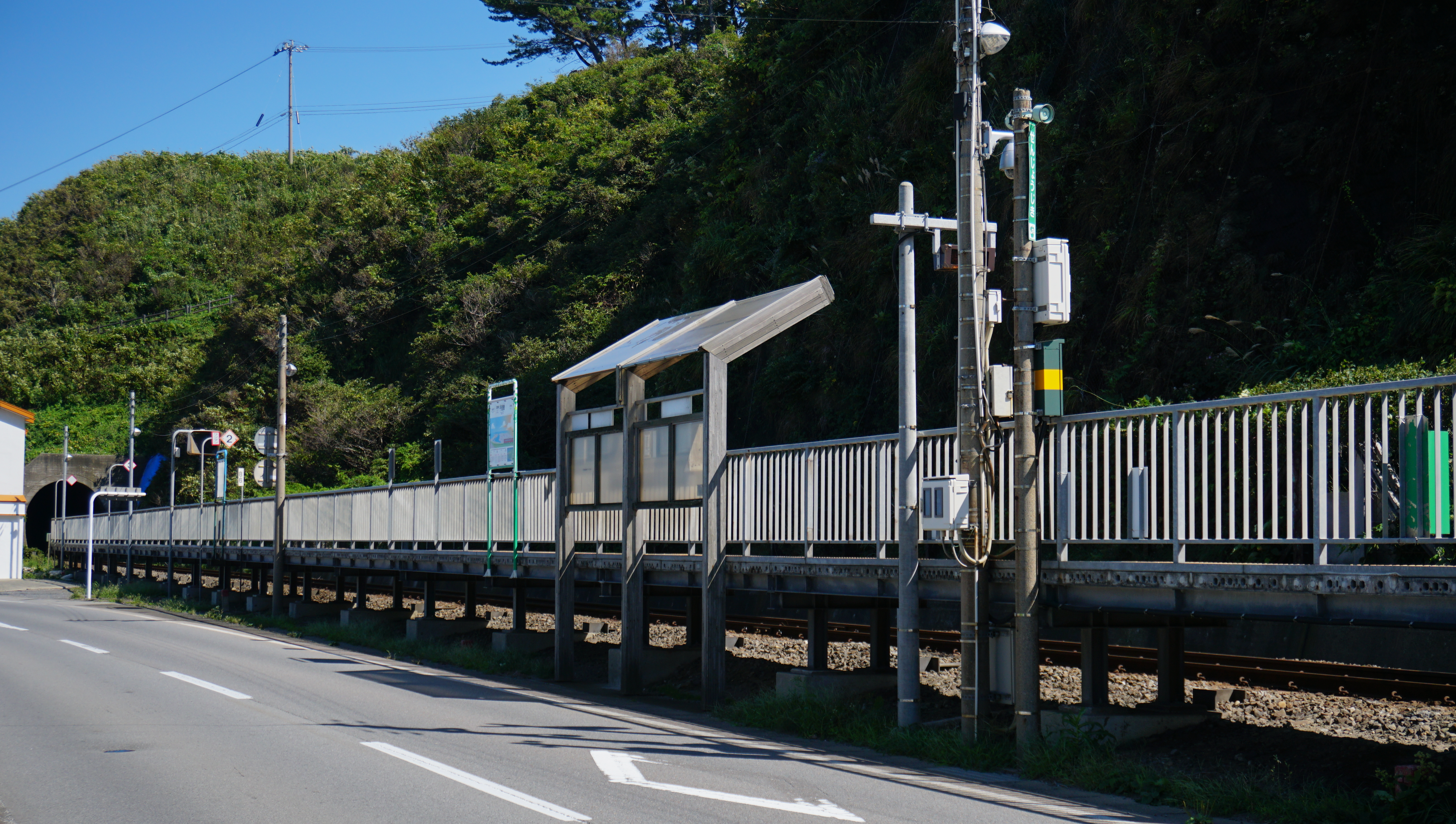
- Senjōjiki Station in September 2019

General information
- Location: Kita-Kanegasawa Sakakibara 145, Fukaura-machi, Nishitsugaru-gun, Aomori-ken 038-2504; Japan
- Coordinates: 40°46′03.97″N 140°03′17.40″E
- Operator: JR East
- Line: ■ Gonō Line
- Distance: 86.0 km from Higashi-Noshiro
- Platforms: 1 side platform

Other information
- Status: Unstaffed
- Website: Official website (in Japanese)

History
- Opened: October 1, 1987

Services
Preceding station	JR East	Following station
Fukaura towards Higashi-Noshiro	Gonō Line Rapid	Kita-Kanegasawa One-way operation
Ōdose towards Higashi-Noshiro	Gonō Line Local	Kita-Kanegasawa towards Hirosaki
Location
- Location within Japan

Senjōjiki Station (千畳敷駅, Senjōjiki-eki) is a railway station in the town of Fukaura, Aomori Prefecture, Japan, operated by on the East Japan Railway Company (JR East).

== Lines ==
Senjōjiki Station is a station on the Gonō Line, and is located 84.0 kilometers from the terminus of the line at Higashi-Noshiro.

== Station layout ==
Senjōjiki Station has one ground-level side platform serving a single bi-directional track. The station is unattended and is managed from Goshogawara Station. There is no station building.

== History ==
Senjōjiki Station was opened on July 7, 1954 as the Senjōjiki Signal Stop. It was elevated in status to that of a temporary (seasonal) station on the Japan National Railways (JNR) on October 1, 1969. With the privatization of the JNR on April 1, 1987, it came under the operational control of JR East. It was elevated in status to that of a full station on October 1, 1987.

== Surrounding area ==
- National Route 101
- The rock formations of Senjōjiki Beach, part of the Tsugaru Quasi-National Park.

== See also ==
- List of railway stations in Japan
