= Jūniko Station =

Railway station in Fukaura, Aomori Prefecture, Japan

Jūniko Station 十二湖駅
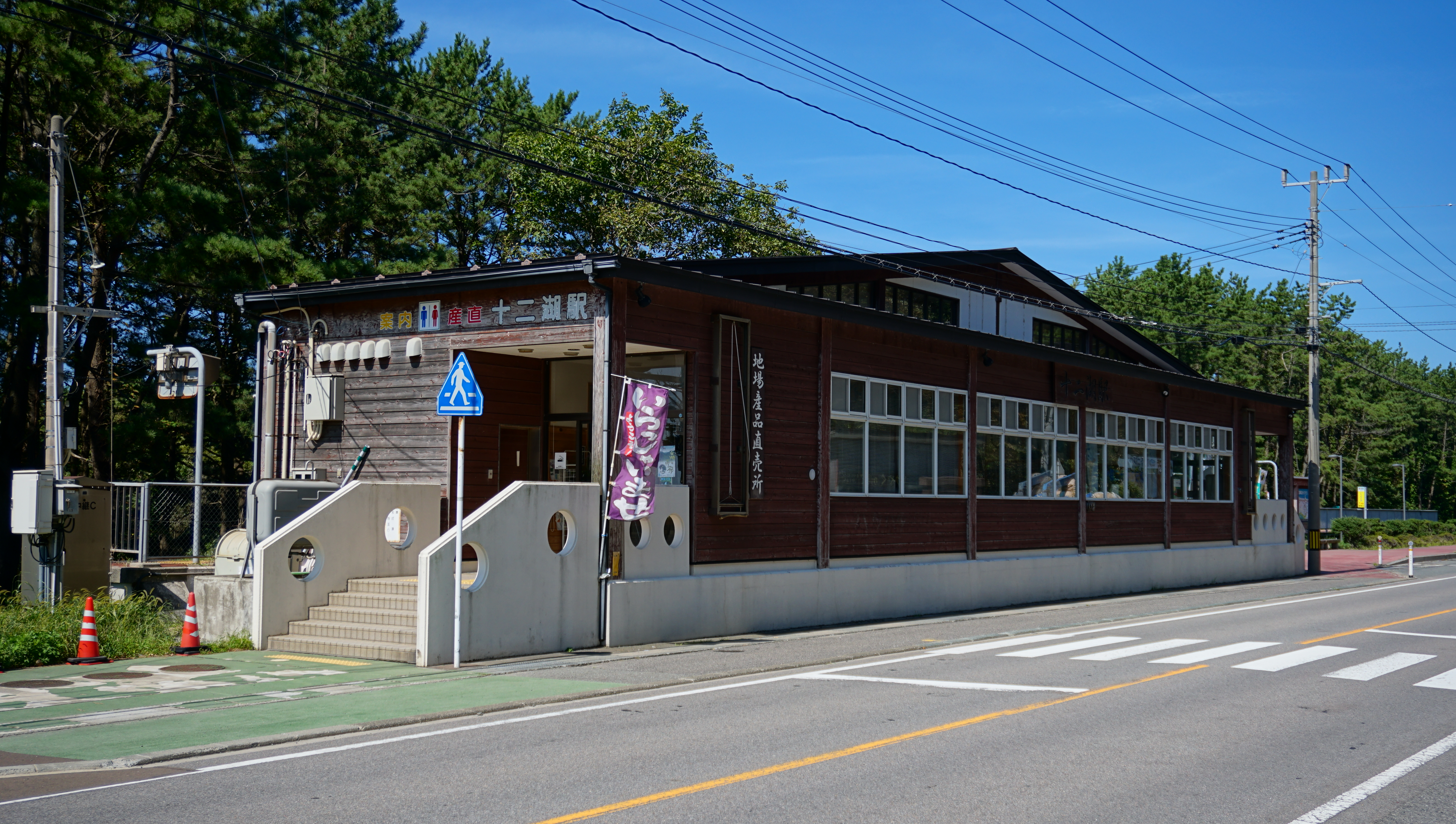
- Jūniko Station in September 2019

General information
- Location: Matsugami Shimo-Hamamatsu 32, Fukaura-machi, Nishitsugaru-gun Aomori-ken 038-2206; Japan
- Coordinates: 40°33′05.63″N 139°56′31.01″E
- Operator: JR East
- Line: ■ Gonō Line
- Distance: 46.6 km from Higashi-Noshiro
- Platforms: 1 side platform

Other information
- Status: Unstaffed
- Website: Official website (in Japanese)

History
- Opened: September 15, 1959

Services
Preceding station	JR East	Following station
Iwadate towards Higashi-Noshiro	Gonō Line Rapid	WeSPa-Tsubakiyama One-way operation
Matsukami towards Higashi-Noshiro	Gonō Line Local	Mutsu-Iwasaki towards Hirosaki
Location
- Location within Japan

Jūniko Station (十二湖駅, Jūniko-eki) is a railway station located in the town of Fukaura, Aomori Prefecture Japan, operated by the East Japan Railway Company (JR East).

== Lines ==
Jūniko Station is a station on the Gonō Line, and is located 46.6 kilometers from the terminus of the line at Higashi-Noshiro.

== Station layout ==
Jūniko Station has one ground-level side platform serving a single bi-directional track. The station is unattended, and is managed from Goshogawara Station. The current station building was built by former Iwasaki Village to encourage tourism to the Jūniko Lakes.

== History ==
Jūniko Station was opened on September 15, 1959 as the Jūniko Signal Stop. With the privatization of the Japanese National Railways on April 1, 1987, it came under the operational control of JR East, and was elevated in status to that of a full station; however, initially only the Rapid Resort Shirakami stopped at the station. As of February 1, 1988 all normal local trains began to serve the station. The station building was completed on March 19, 2005.

== Surrounding area ==
- National Route 101
- Jūniko Lakes in the Tsugaru Quasi-National Park.

== See also ==
- List of railway stations in Japan
