= Hiroto Station =

Railway station in Fukaura, Aomori Prefecture, Japan

Hiroto Station 広戸駅
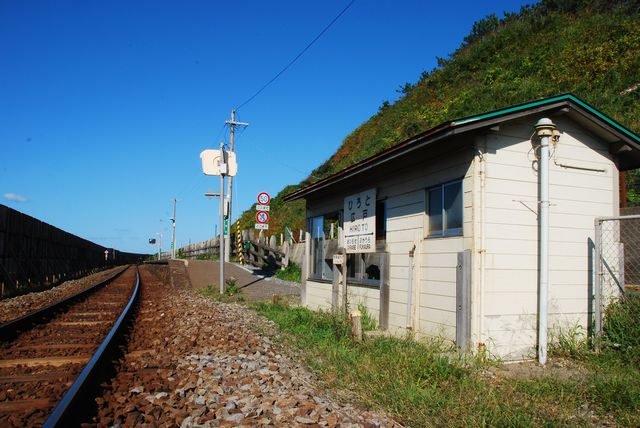
- Hiroto Station in September 2008

General information
- Location: Hiroto, Fukaura-machi, Nishitsugaru-gun, Aomori 038-2321; Japan
- Coordinates: 40°40′27.29″N 139°57′20.12″E
- Operator: JR East
- Line: ■ Gonō Line
- Distance: 70.8 km from Higashi-Noshiro
- Platforms: 1 side platform

Other information
- Status: Unstaffed
- Website: Official website (in Japanese)

History
- Opened: December 25, 1954

Services
Preceding station	JR East	Following station
Fukaura towards Higashi-Noshiro	Gonō Line Local	Oirase towards Hirosaki
Location
- Location within Japan

Hiroto Station (広戸駅, Hiroto-eki) is a railway station located in the town of Fukaura, Aomori Prefecture Japan, operated by the East Japan Railway Company (JR East).

== Lines ==
Hiroto Station is a station on the Gonō Line, and is located 70.8 kilometers from the terminus of the line at Higashi-Noshiro.

== Station layout ==
Hiroto Station has one ground-level side platform serving a single bi-directional track. The station is unattended, and is managed from Goshogawara Station. There is a small weather shelter on the platform but no station building.

== History ==
Hiroto Station was opened on December 25, 1954 as a station on the Japan National Railways (JNR). With the privatization of the JNR on April 1, 1987, it came under the operational control of JR East.

== Surroundings ==
- National Route 101
- Sea of Japan, the station is located on the shoreline with a high fence adjacent to the tracks to block waves in stormy weather.

== See also ==
- List of railway stations in Japan
