= Ajigasawa Station =

Railway station in Ajigasawa, Aomori Prefecture, Japan

Ajigasawa Station 鰺ヶ沢駅
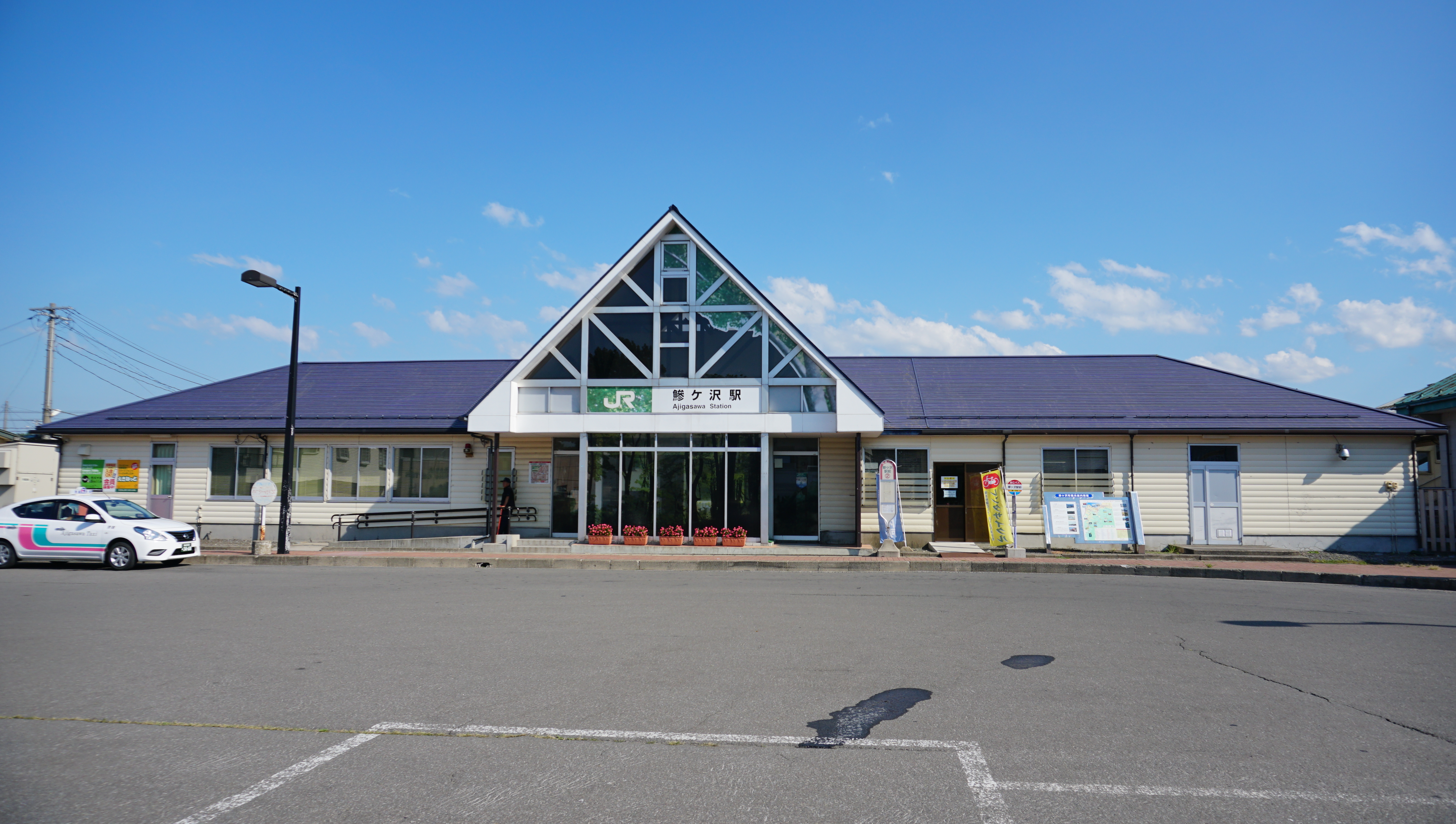
- Ajigasawa Station in September 2019

General information
- Location: Maito-machi Shimotomita 36, Ajigasawa-machi, Nishitsugaru-gun, Aomori-ken 038-2761; Japan
- Coordinates: 40°46′31″N 140°13′15″E
- Operator: JR East
- Line: ■ Gonō Line
- Distance: 103.8 kilometers from Higashi-Noshiro
- Platforms: 2 side platforms

Other information
- Status: Staffed ( Midori no Madoguchi)
- Website: www.jreast.co.jp/estation/station/info.aspx?StationCd=53

History
- Opened: 1925

Passengers
- FY2016: 317

Services
Preceding station	JR East	Following station
Kita-Kanegasawa towards Higashi-Noshiro	Gonō Line Rapid	Narusawa One-way operation
Mutsu-Akaishi towards Higashi-Noshiro	Gonō Line Local	Narusawa towards Hirosaki
Location
- Location within Japan

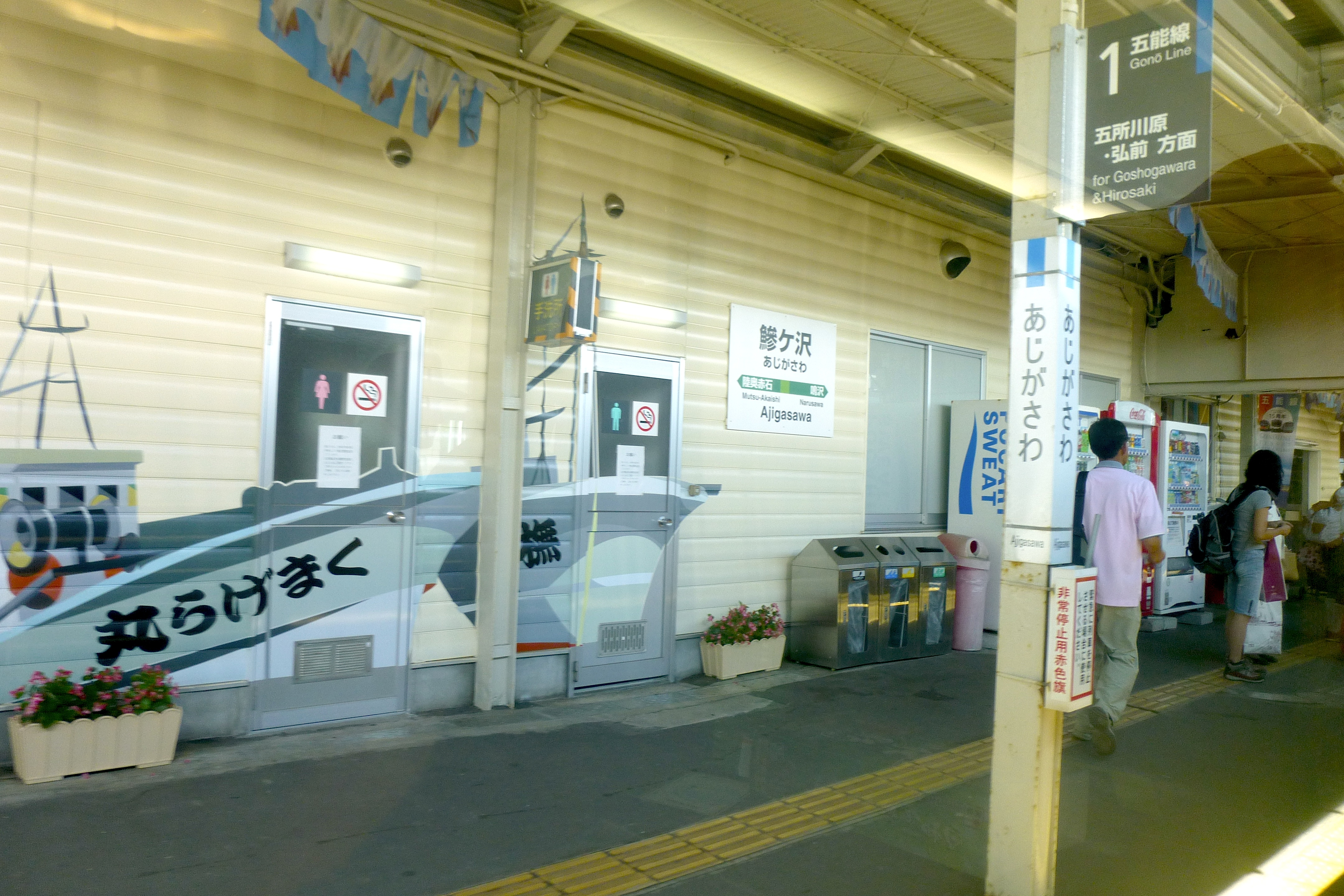
Station platform, 2012.

Ajigasawa Station (鰺ヶ沢駅, Ajigasawa-eki) is a railway station located in the town of Ajigasawa, Aomori Prefecture, Japan, operated by the East Japan Railway Company (JR East).

== Lines ==
Ajigasawa Station is served by the Gonō Line. It is 103.8 kilometers from the terminus of the Line at Higashi-Noshiro.

== Station layout ==
Ajigasawa Station has dual opposed side platforms connected by a footbridge. The station has a Midori no Madoguchi staffed ticket office.

=== Platforms ===
1	■ Gonō Line	For Goshogawara, Hirosaki and Aomori
2	■ Gonō Line	Fukaura and Higashi-Noshiro

== Bus services ==
- Kōnan bus
  - For Fukaura via Kita-Kanegasawa and Ōdose
  - For Hirosaki Station via Tokoshinai
  - For Goshogawara Bus office via Morita, Kizukuri and Goshogawara Station
  - For Kuromori

== History ==
Ajigasawa Station was opened on May 15, 1925, as a station on the Japanese Government Railways (JGR). With the privatization of the Japanese National Railways (successor of JGR) on April 1, 1987, it came under the operational control of JR East. A new station building was completed in 1991. From April 1, 2003, it has been a kan'i itaku station, administered by Goshogawara Station, and operated by Ajigasawa municipal authority, with point-of-sales terminal installed.

== Passenger statistics ==
In fiscal 2016, the station was used by an average of 317 passengers daily (boarding passengers only).

== Surrounding area ==
- Maito Post Office
- National Route 101

== See also ==
- List of railway stations in Japan
