= Noshiro Station =

Railway station in Noshiro, Akita Prefecture, Japan

Noshiro Station 能代駅
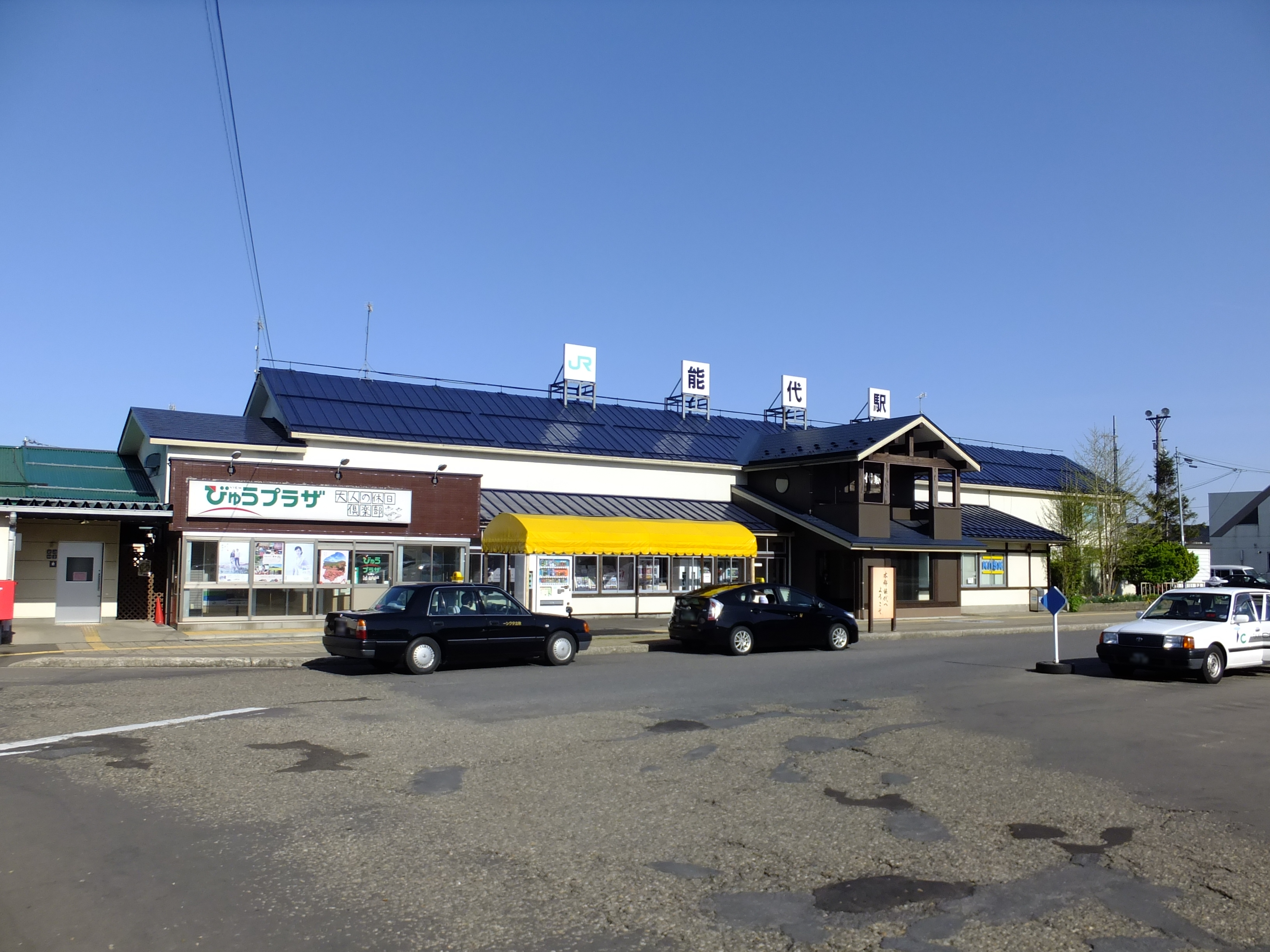
- Noshiro Station in May 2017

General information
- Location: 14-40 Motomachi, Noshiro-shi, Akita-ken 016-0831; Japan
- Coordinates: 40°12′23.6″N 140°1′58.6″E
- Operator: JR East
- Line: ■ Gonō Line
- Distance: 3.9 km from Higashi-Noshiro
- Platforms: 2 side platforms
- Tracks: 2

Other information
- Website: Official website

History
- Opened: 1 July 1908
- Former names: Noshiromachi (until 1909)

Passengers
- FY2018: 430 daily

Services
Preceding station	JR East	Following station
Higashi-Noshiro Terminus	Gonō Line Rapid	Akitashirakami One-way operation
Higashi-Noshiro Terminus	Gonō Line Local	Mukai-Noshiro towards Hirosaki
Location
- Location within Akita Prefecture Location within Japan

Noshiro Station (能代駅, Noshiro-eki) is a railway station in the city of Noshiro, Akita, Japan, operated by the East Japan Railway Company (JR East).

== Lines ==
Noshiro Station is served by the Gonō Line, and is 3.9 kilometers from the terminus of the line at Higashi-Noshiro.

== Station layout ==
Noshiro Station consists of two ground-level opposed side platforms serving two tracks, connected to the station building by a footbridge. The station is staffed.

=== Platforms ===
1	■ Gonō Line	for Iwadate and Fukaura for Higashi-Noshiro (Starting services)
2	■ Gonō Line	for Higashi-Noshiro

== History ==
The station opened on 1 July 1908 as Noshiromachi Station (能代駅). It was renamed Noshiro Station on 1 November 1909. With the privatization of Japanese National Railways (JNR) on 1 April 1987, the station came under the control of JR East.

== Passenger statistics ==
In fiscal 2018, the station was used by an average of 430 passengers daily (boarding passengers only).

== Surrounding area ==
- Noshiroekimae Post office
- Noshiro Post office
- Noshiro City hall

== See also ==
- List of railway stations in Japan
