= Mutsu-Sawabe Station =

Railway station in Fukaura, Aomori Prefecture, Japan

Mutsu-Sawabe Station 陸奥沢辺駅
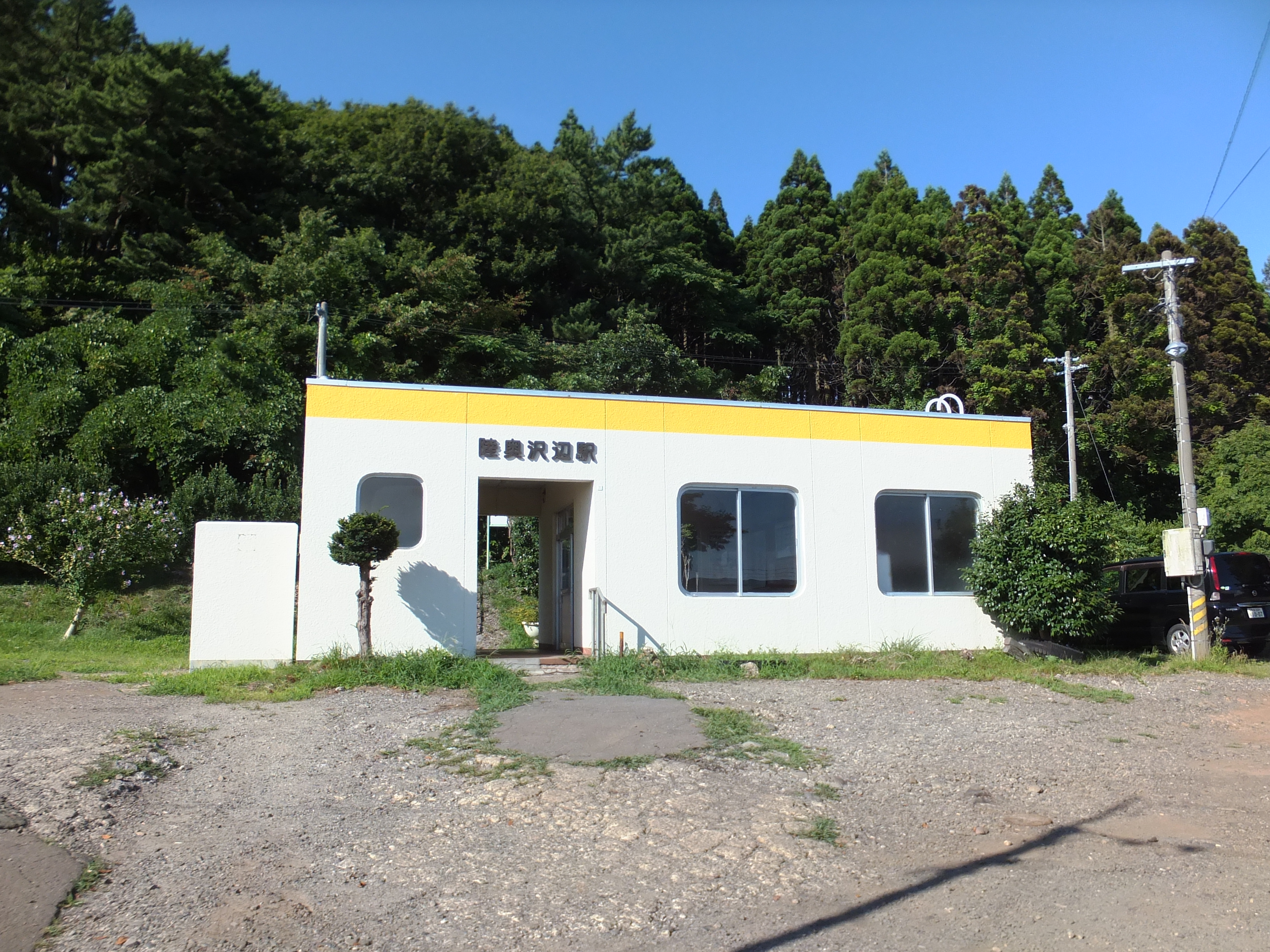
- Mutsu-Sawabe Station in August 2019

General information
- Location: Sawabe, Fukaura-machi, Nishitsugaru-gun, Aomori-ken 038-2201; Japan
- Coordinates: 40°35′10.28″N 139°53′42.08″E
- Operator: JR East
- Line: ■ Gonō Line
- Distance: 53.6 km from Higashi-Noshiro
- Platforms: 1 side platform

Other information
- Status: Unstaffed
- Website: Official website (in Japanese)

History
- Opened: July 30, 1932

Services
Preceding station	JR East	Following station
Mutsu-Iwasaki towards Higashi-Noshiro	Gonō Line Local	WeSPa-Tsubakiyama towards Hirosaki
Location
- Location within Japan

Mutsu-Sawabe Station (陸奥沢辺駅, Mutsu-Sawabe-eki) is a railway station located in the town of Fukaura, Aomori Prefecture, Japan, operated by the East Japan Railway Company (JR East).

== Lines ==
Mutsu-Sawabe Station is a station on the Gonō Line, and is located 39.9 kilometers from the terminus of the line at Higashi-Noshiro.

== Station layout ==
Mutsu-Sawabe Station has one ground-level side platform serving a single bi-directional track. The station is unattended, and is managed from Fukaura Station. The station building is of identical design to that of Ōmagoshi and Higashi-Hachimori.

== History ==
Mutsu-Sawabe Station was opened on July 30, 1932 as a station on the Japanese Government Railways (JGR). With the privatization of the Japanese National Railways (successor of JGR) on April 1, 1987, it came under the operational control of JR East.

== Surrounding area ==
- National Route 101

== See also ==
- List of railway stations in Japan
