= Mutsu-Yanagita Station =

Railway station in Fukaura, Aomori Prefecture, Japan

Mutsu-Yanagita Station 陸奥柳田駅
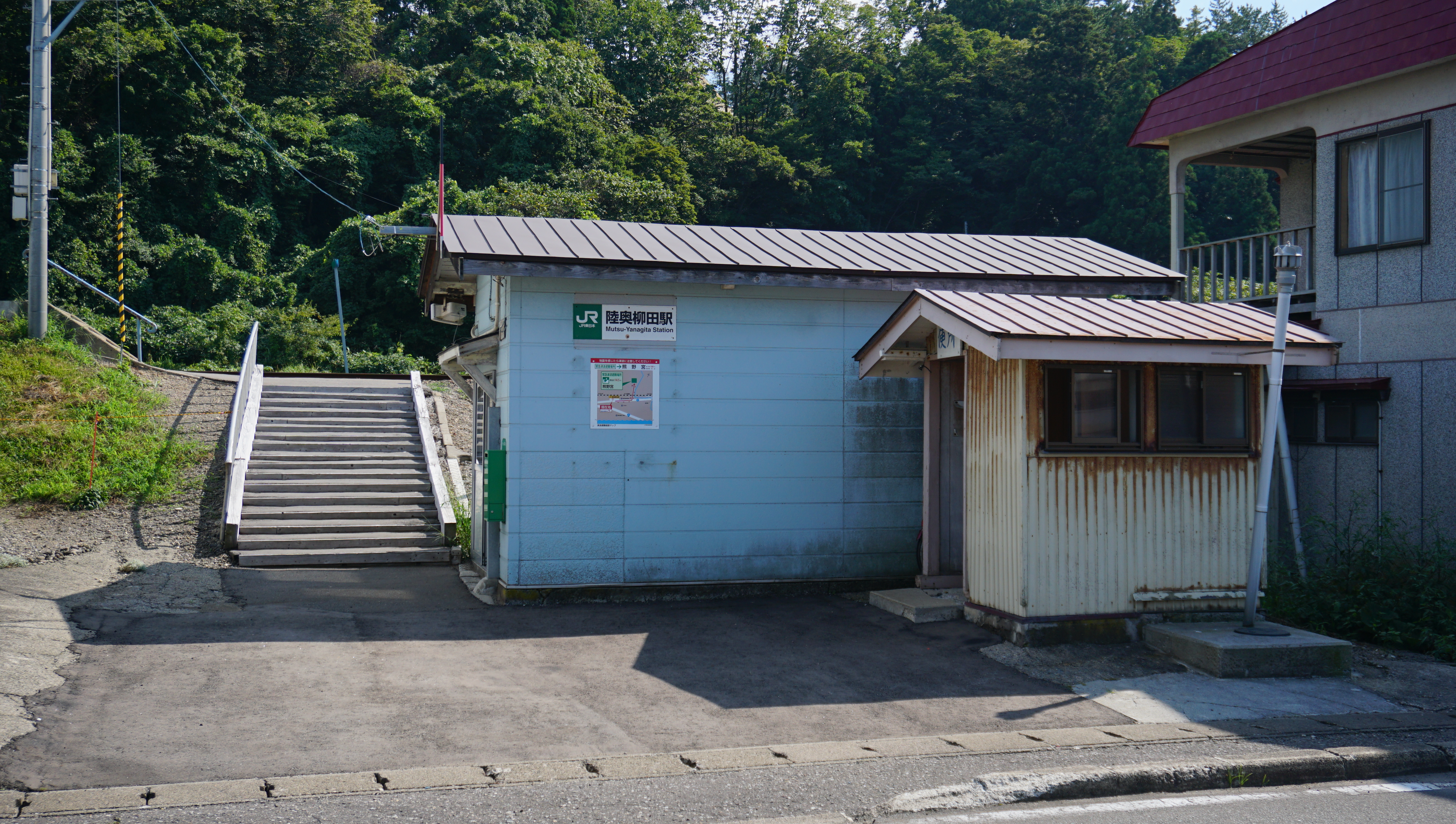
- Mutsu-Yanagita Station in September 2019

General information
- Location: Yanagita-Miyazaki, Fukaura-machi, Nishitsugaru-gun, Aomori-ken 038-250; Japan
- Coordinates: 40°44′26.44″N 140°7′24.12″E
- Operator: JR East
- Line: ■ Gonō Line
- Distance: 93.3 km from Higashi-Noshiro
- Platforms: 1 side platform

Other information
- Status: Unstaffed
- Website: Official website (in Japanese)

History
- Opened: June 1, 1953

Services
Preceding station	JR East	Following station
Kita-Kanegasawa towards Higashi-Noshiro	Gonō Line Local	Mutsu-Akaishi towards Hirosaki
Location
- Location within Japan

Mutsu-Yanagita Station (陸奥柳田駅, Mutsu-Yanagita-eki) is a railway station located in the town of Fukaura, Aomori Prefecture, Japan, operated by the East Japan Railway Company (JR East).

== Lines ==
Mutsu-Yanagita Station is a station on the Gonō Line, and is located 93.3 kilometers from the terminus of the line at Higashi-Noshiro.

== Station layout ==
Mutsu-Yanagita Station has one ground-level side platform serving a single bi-directional track. The station is unattended and is managed from Goshogawara Station. There is no station building.

== History ==
Mutsu-Yanagita Station was opened on June 1, 1953 as a station on the Japan National Railways (JNR). With the privatization of the JNR on April 1, 1987, it came under the operational control of JR East.

== Surrounding area ==
- National Route 101

== See also ==
- List of railway stations in Japan
