= Mutsu-Akaishi Station =

Railway station in Ajigasawa, Aomori Prefecture, Japan

Mutsu-Akaishi Station 陸奥赤石駅
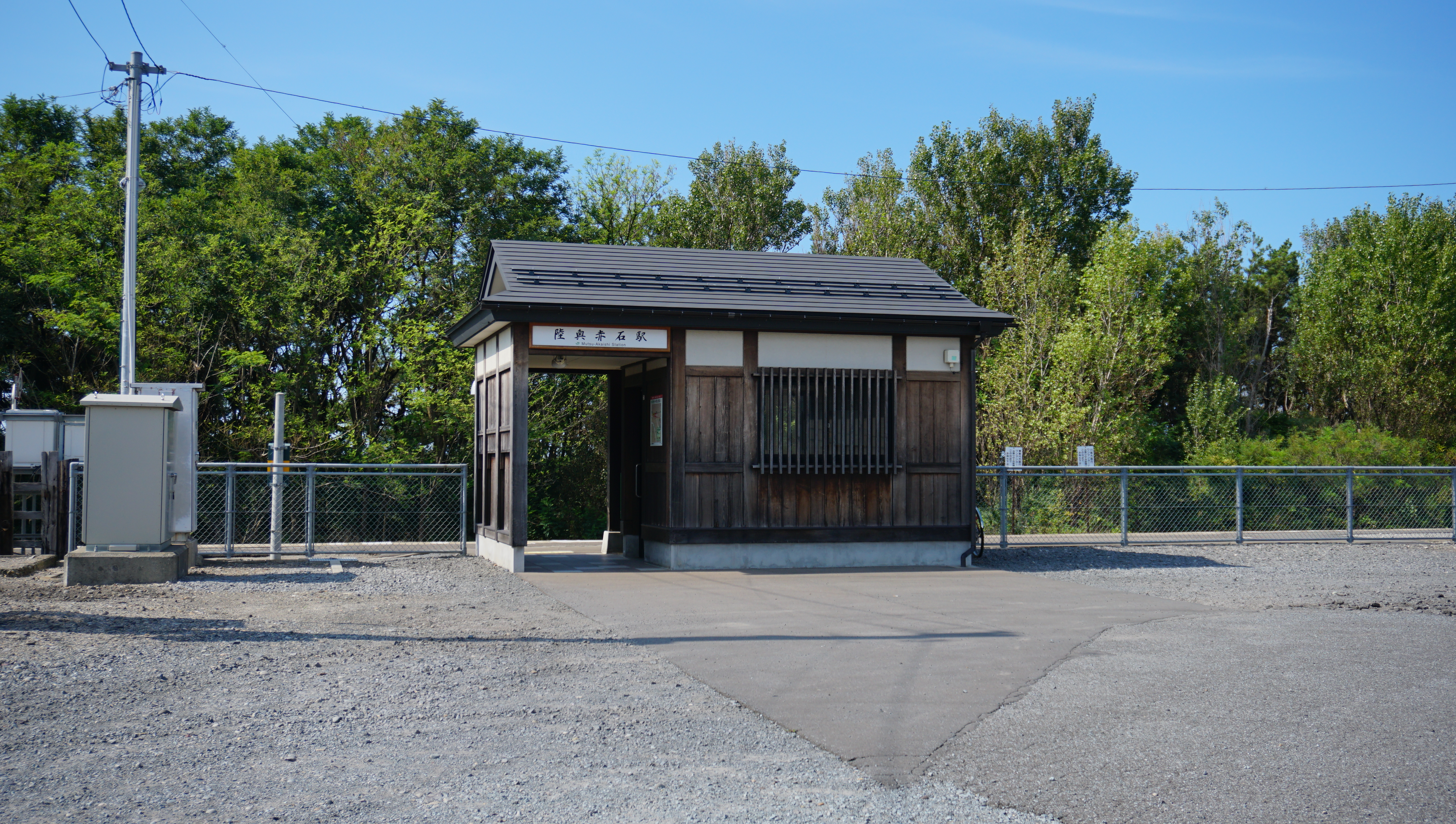
- Mutsu-Akaishi Station in September 2019

General information
- Location: Akaishi-machi, Ajigasawa-machi, Nishitsugaru-gun, Aomori-ken 038-2731; Japan
- Coordinates: 40°45′41.99″N 140°09′43.85″E
- Operator: JR East
- Line: ■ Gonō Line
- Distance: 97.4 km from Higashi-Noshiro
- Platforms: 1 side platform

Other information
- Status: Unstaffed
- Website: Official website (in Japanese)

History
- Opened: November 26, 1929

Services
Preceding station	JR East	Following station
Mutsu-Yanagita towards Higashi-Noshiro	Gonō Line Local	Ajigasawa towards Hirosaki
Location
- Location within Japan

Mutsu-Akaishi Station (陸奥赤石駅, Mutsu-Akaishi-eki) is a railway station located in the town of Ajigasawa, Aomori Prefecture Japan, operated by the East Japan Railway Company (JR East).

== Lines ==
Mutsu-Akaishi Station is a station on the Gonō Line, and is located 97.4 kilometers from the terminus of the line at Higashi-Noshiro.

== Station layout ==
Mutsu-Akaishi Station has one ground-level side platform serving a single bi-directional track. The station is unattended. The station was built with dual opposed side platforms, but only the former southbound platform is now used.

== History ==
Mutsu-Akaishi Station was opened on November 26, 1929, as a station on the Japan National Railways (JNR). It has been unattended since March 19, 1984. With the privatization of the JNR on April 1, 1987, it came under the operational control of JR East.

== Surrounding area ==
- National Route 101
- Akaishi Post Office

== See also ==
- List of railway stations in Japan
