= Fukaura =

Fukaura 深浦町
- Town
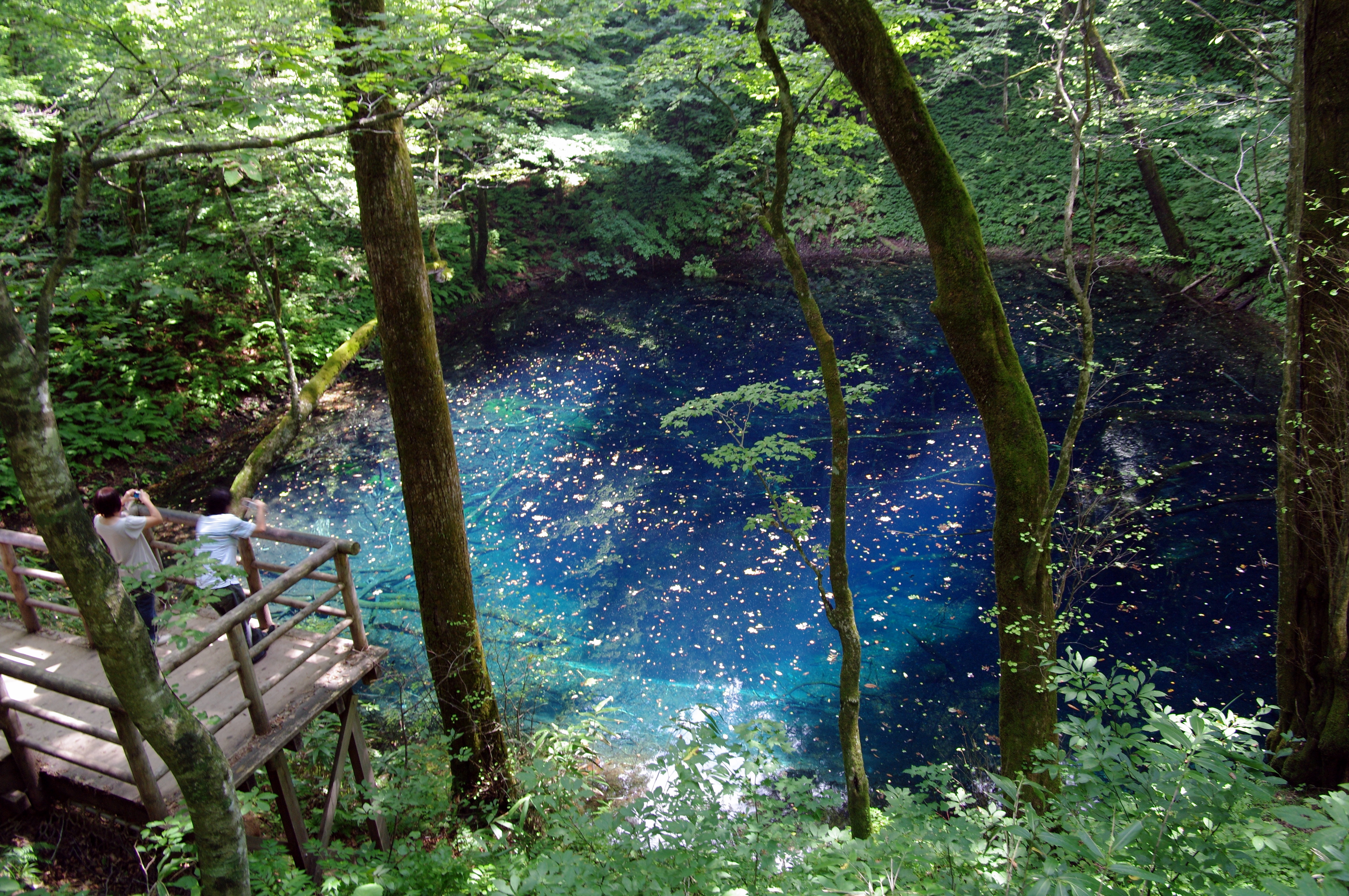
- Ao-ike (the blue lake)

- Flag Seal
- Location of Fukaura in Aomori Prefecture

- Coordinates: 40°38′52″N 139°55′39″E
- Country: Japan
- Region: Tōhoku
- Prefecture: Aomori
- District: Nishitsugaru

Area
  - Total: 488.91 km^{2} (188.77 sq mi)

Population (December 31, 2025)
  - Total: 6,579
  - Density: 13.46/km^{2} (34.85/sq mi)
- Time zone: UTC+9 (Japan Standard Time)
- Phone number: 0173-74-2111
- Address: 84-2 Nashirozawa, Fukaura-machi, Nishitsugaru-gun, Aomori-ken 038-2324
- Climate: Cfa
- Website: Official website
- Symbols
- Bird: Common gull
- Flower: Far East Amur adonis
- Tree: Siebold’s Beech

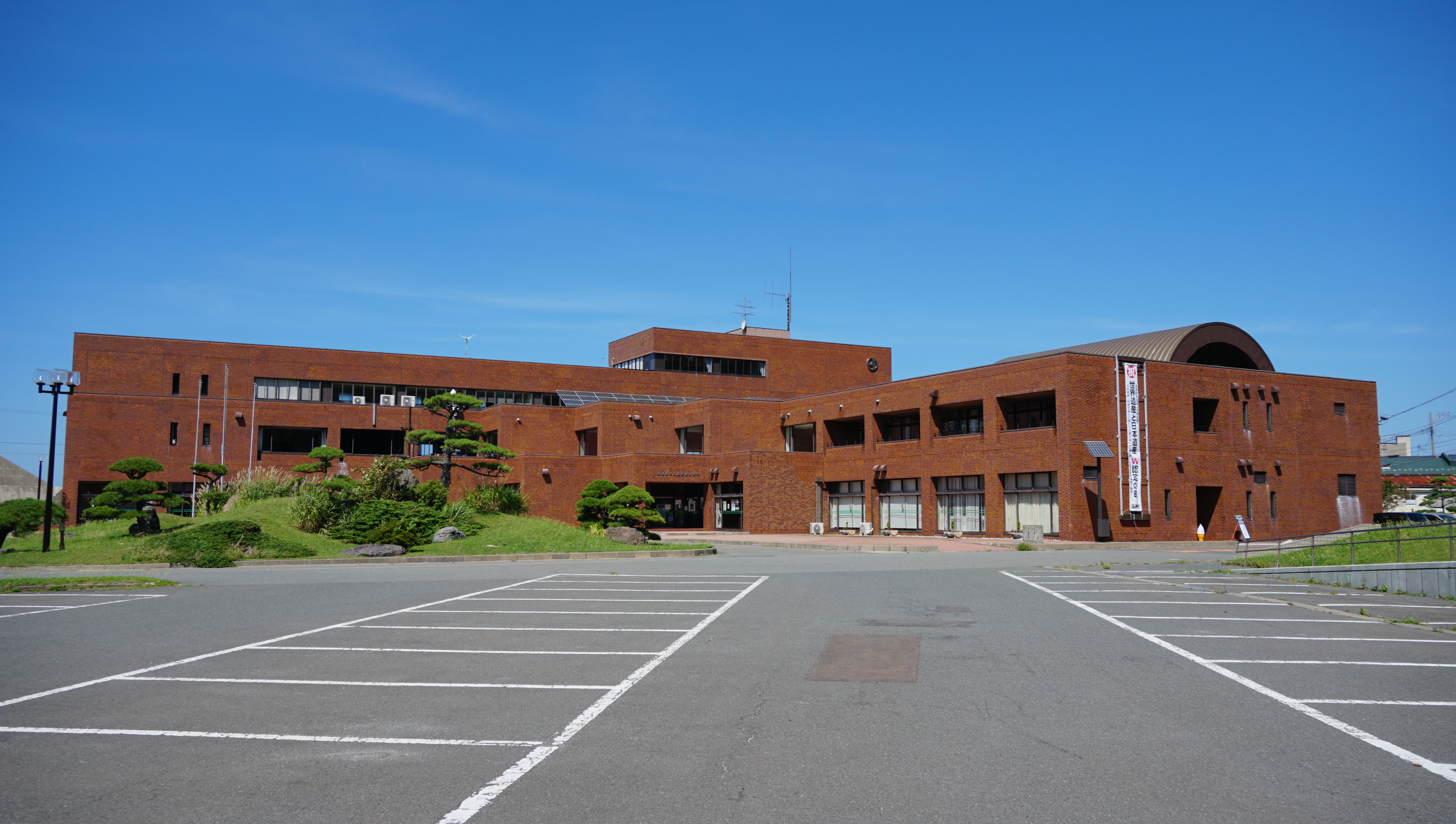
Fukaura Town Hall

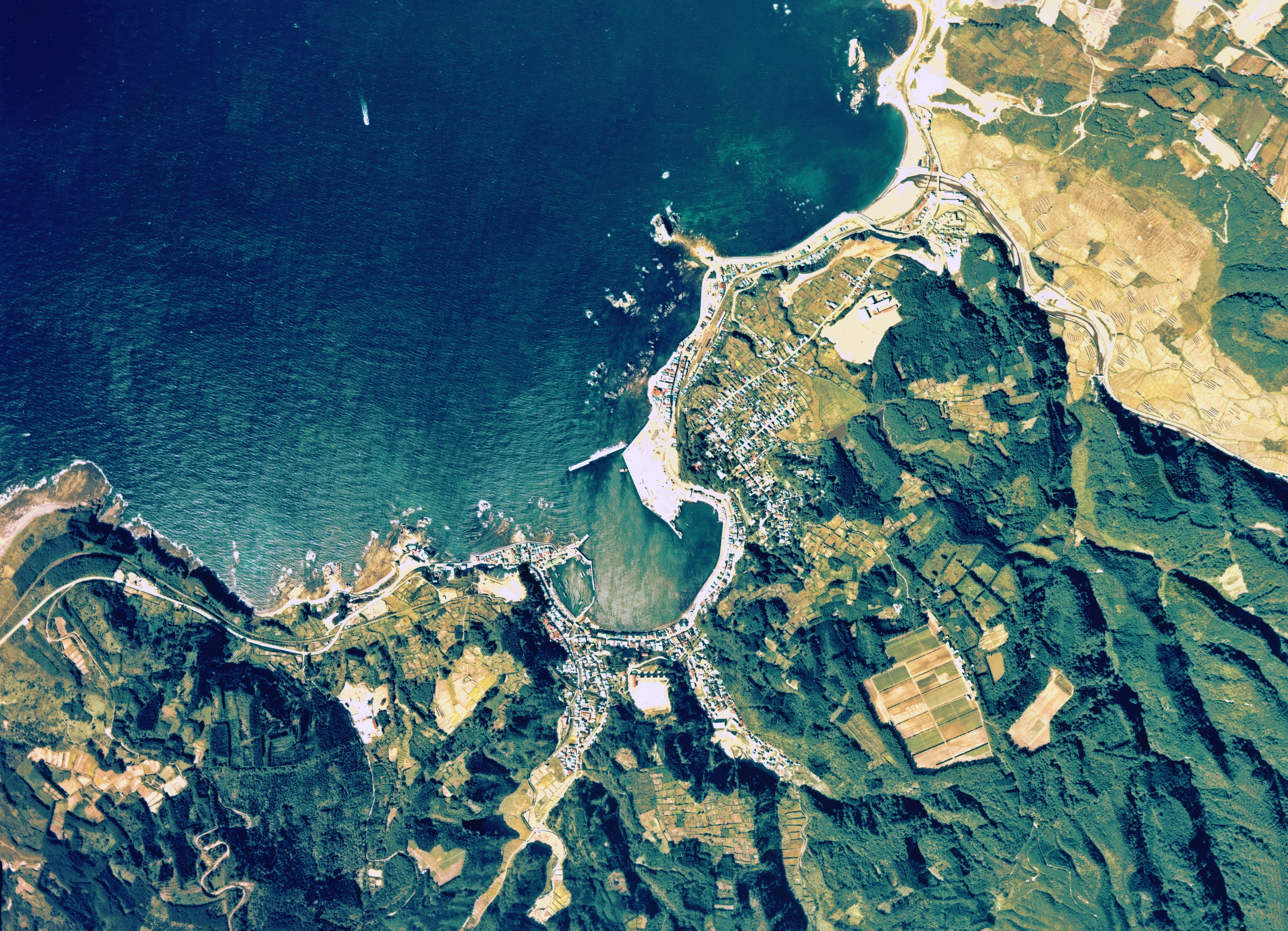
Aerial view of Fukaura town center

Fukaura (深浦町, Fukaura-machi) is a town located in Aomori Prefecture, Japan. As of 31 December 2025, the town had an estimated population of 6,579 in 3430 households, and a population density of 14 persons per km^{2}. The total area of the town is 488.91 km^{2} (188.77 sq mi).

== Geography ==
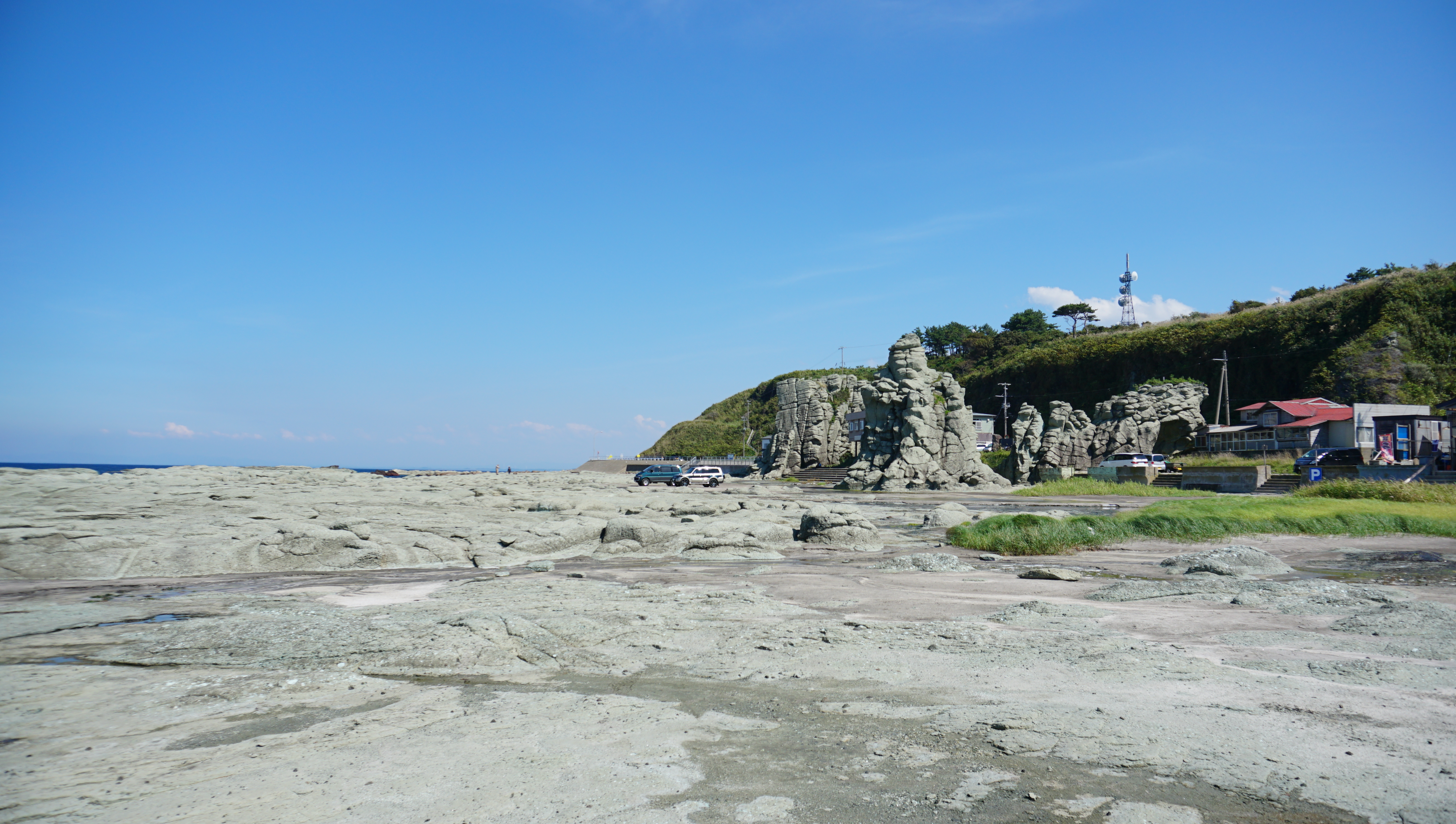
Senjojiki Coast

Fukaura is in Nishitsugaru District, Aomori, and occupies the far southwestern coastline of Aomori Prefecture, facing the Sea of Japan. The area is topographically steep and mountainous, with mountains stretching all the way to the coastline. As a result, although it is the fifth largest city in Aomori Prefecture, approximately 90% of the land is forest and wilderness. The southwestern corner of the town is located within the borders of the Shirakami-Sanchi, a UNESCO World Heritage Site, and some coastal areas of the town are within the Tsugaru Quasi-National Park. The islets of Kyūroku-jima in the Sea of Japan are located within the boundaries of the town, giving it the westernmost point of Aomori Prefecture.

=== Neighbouring municipalities ===
- Akita Prefecture
  - Happō
- Aomori Prefecture
  - Ajigasawa

=== Climate ===
The town has a hot humid continental climate (Köppen Dfa) bordering on humid subtropical climate (Cfa) characterized by warm short summers and long cold winters with heavy snowfall. The average annual temperature in Fukaura is 7.4 °C. The average annual rainfall is 1604 mm with September as the wettest month. The temperatures are highest on average in August, at around 23.2 °C, and lowest in January, at around 0.0 °C.

Climate data for Fukaura (1991−2020 normals, extremes 1940−present)
Month	Jan	Feb	Mar	Apr	May	Jun	Jul	Aug	Sep	Oct	Nov	Dec	Year
Record high °C (°F)	14.1 (57.4)	19.9 (67.8)	19.7 (67.5)	25.6 (78.1)	28.9 (84.0)	29.6 (85.3)	35.1 (95.2)	37.9 (100.2)	34.4 (93.9)	30.6 (87.1)	25.1 (77.2)	19.7 (67.5)	37.9 (100.2)
Mean maximum °C (°F)	8.5 (47.3)	10.2 (50.4)	14.9 (58.8)	20.5 (68.9)	24.5 (76.1)	26.9 (80.4)	30.4 (86.7)	31.3 (88.3)	29.5 (85.1)	23.3 (73.9)	18.6 (65.5)	13.1 (55.6)	32.0 (89.6)
Mean daily maximum °C (°F)	2.3 (36.1)	3.0 (37.4)	6.7 (44.1)	12.7 (54.9)	17.8 (64.0)	21.6 (70.9)	25.3 (77.5)	27.1 (80.8)	23.6 (74.5)	17.5 (63.5)	11.1 (52.0)	5.1 (41.2)	14.5 (58.1)
Daily mean °C (°F)	0.0 (32.0)	0.3 (32.5)	3.2 (37.8)	8.5 (47.3)	13.5 (56.3)	17.5 (63.5)	21.7 (71.1)	23.2 (73.8)	19.5 (67.1)	13.6 (56.5)	7.9 (46.2)	2.4 (36.3)	10.9 (51.7)
Mean daily minimum °C (°F)	−2.4 (27.7)	−2.2 (28.0)	0.1 (32.2)	4.5 (40.1)	9.6 (49.3)	14.1 (57.4)	18.7 (65.7)	20.0 (68.0)	15.9 (60.6)	10.0 (50.0)	4.7 (40.5)	−0.3 (31.5)	7.7 (45.9)
Mean minimum °C (°F)	−6.3 (20.7)	−6.6 (20.1)	−4.3 (24.3)	−0.4 (31.3)	4.1 (39.4)	9.4 (48.9)	14.5 (58.1)	15.4 (59.7)	11.1 (52.0)	5.1 (41.2)	−1.0 (30.2)	−5.2 (22.6)	−7.3 (18.9)
Record low °C (°F)	−10.5 (13.1)	−9.8 (14.4)	−8.8 (16.2)	−4.1 (24.6)	0.2 (32.4)	5.6 (42.1)	8.5 (47.3)	12.4 (54.3)	6.9 (44.4)	1.8 (35.2)	−5.8 (21.6)	−9.8 (14.4)	−10.5 (13.1)
Average precipitation mm (inches)	100.3 (3.95)	84.0 (3.31)	84.3 (3.32)	90.5 (3.56)	120.2 (4.73)	98.5 (3.88)	145.1 (5.71)	174.9 (6.89)	163.6 (6.44)	170.4 (6.71)	159.6 (6.28)	137.6 (5.42)	1,529 (60.20)
Average snowfall cm (inches)	80 (31)	66 (26)	27 (11)	1 (0.4)	0 (0)	0 (0)	0 (0)	0 (0)	0 (0)	0 (0)	4 (1.6)	50 (20)	226 (89)
Average precipitation days (≥ 1.0 mm)	19.5	15.7	13.5	10.5	10.3	9.3	10.8	10.5	11.7	13.7	16.7	19.1	161.3
Average snowy days (≥ 1 cm)	20.2	17.5	8.3	0.4	0	0	0	0	0	0	1.6	12.3	60.3
Average relative humidity (%)	70	69	67	69	76	82	85	83	80	74	70	70	75
Mean monthly sunshine hours	25.4	46.9	104.4	170.7	194.0	179.3	154.9	178.2	155.3	126.6	63.0	30.9	1,430.8
Source: JMA

== Demographics ==
Per Japanese census data, the population of Fukaura peaked at around the year 1960 and has decreased by more than half over the past 60 years. It is now considerably less than it was a century ago.

Historical population
Year	Pop.	±%
1920	11,706	—
1930	12,492	+6.7%
1940	13,804	+10.5%
1950	19,645	+42.3%
1960	19,842	+1.0%
1970	18,157	−8.5%
1980	15,445	−14.9%
1990	13,335	−13.7%
2000	11,799	−11.5%
2010	9,691	−17.9%
2020	7,346	−24.2%

== History ==
The area around Fukaura was controlled by the Tsugaru clan of Hirosaki Domain during the Edo period. It became a village in Nishitsugaru District with the establishment of the modern municipalities system on April 1, 1889, and was elevated to town status on April 1, 1926. On July 29, 1955, Fukura annexed the neighboring village of Otose. On March 31, 2005, it was merged with the neighboring village of Iwasaki.

== Government ==
Fukaura has a mayor-council form of government with a directly elected mayor and a unicameral town legislature of 12 members. Nishitsugaru District contributes one member to the Aomori Prefectural Assembly. In terms of national politics, the town is part of Aomori 3rd district of the lower house of the Diet of Japan.

== Economy ==
The economy of Fukaura is heavily dependent on commercial fishing.

There is also a small tourism industry centered on the Shirakami Sanchi UNESCO World Heritage area, particularly the Juniko Lakes on its periphery.

== Education ==
Fukaura has three public elementary schools and two public junior high schools operated by the town government. The town's only high school closed in 2023.

== Transportation ==
=== Railway ===
East Japan Railway Company (JR East) - Gonō Line

- Ōmagoshi, Shirakamidaketozanguchi, Matsukami, Jūniko, Mutsu-Iwasaki, Mutsu-Sawabe, WeSPa-Tsubakiyama, Henashi, Yokoiso, Fukaura, Hiroto, Oirase, Todorogi, Kasose, Ōdose, Senjōjiki, Kita-Kanegasawa, Mutsu-Yanagita.

=== Highway ===
National Route 101

== Sister cities ==
- Ranua, Lapland, Finland,

== Local attractions ==
- Shirakami-Sanchi (World Heritage Site)
- Fukaura Town History and Folklore Museum and Art Museum
- Engaku-ji
- Fukaura Literary Museum
- Kazemachi-kan (Kitamaebune Exhibition Museum and Fukaura Town General Tourist Information Center)
- Juniko Lakes

== Noted people from Fukaura ==
- Masatsukasa Kōshin, sumo wrestler
- Kaihō Ryōji, sumo wrestler
- Aminishiki Ryūji, sumo wrestler
- Asōfuji Seiya, sumo wrestler
