= Iwadate Station =

Railway station in Happō, Akita Prefecture, Japan

Iwadate Station 岩館駅
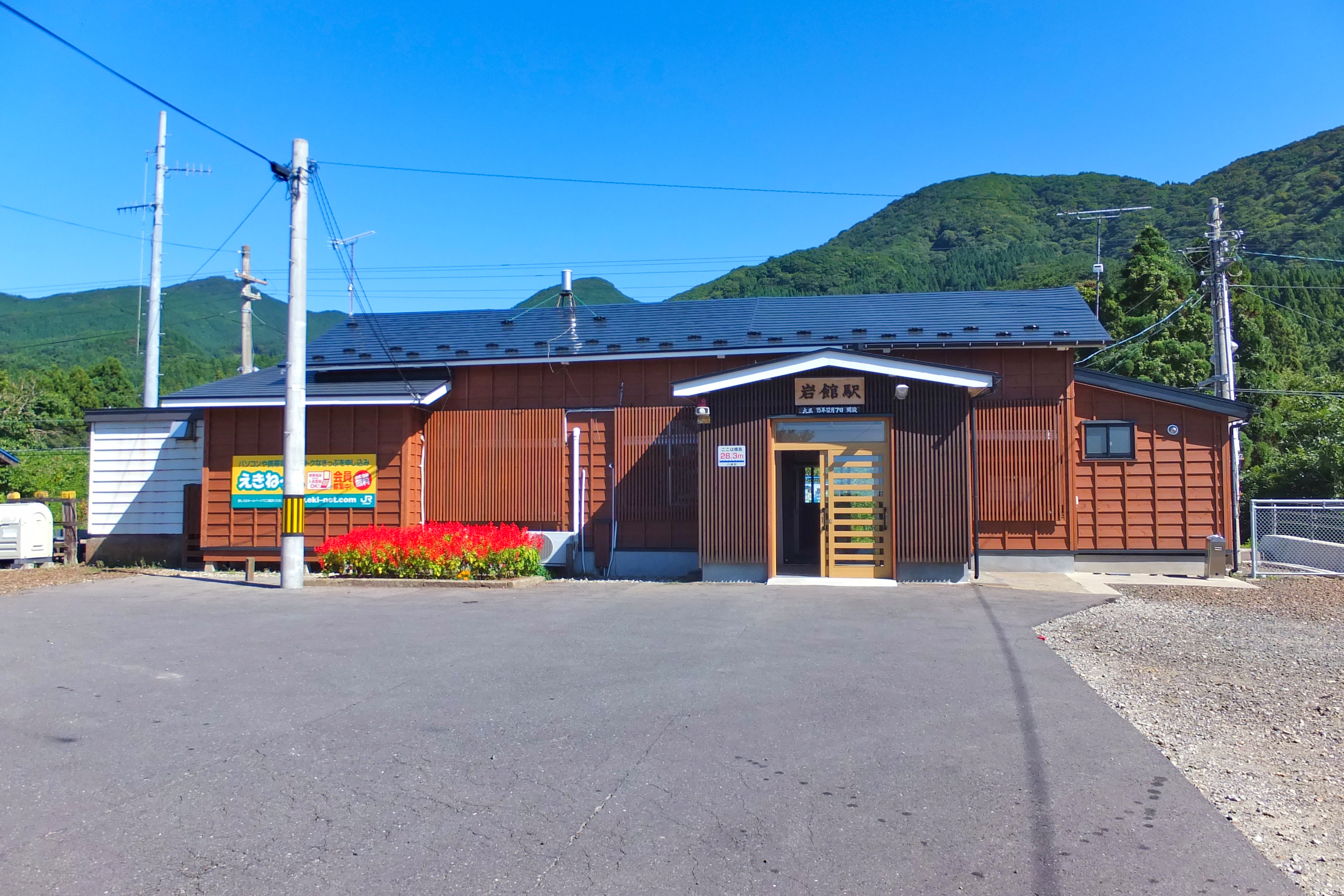
- Iwadate Station, September 2013

General information
- Location: 91 Kamanoue, Hachimori, Happō-cho, Yamamoto-gun, Akita-ken 018-2606; Japan
- Coordinates: 40°24′22.3″N 139°57′58.5″E
- Operator: JR East
- Line: ■ Gonō Line
- Distance: 29.1 kilometers from Higashi-Noshiro
- Platforms: 2 side platforms

Other information
- Status: Unstaffed
- Website: Official website

History
- Opened: 24 November 1926

Passengers
- FY2016: 26

Services
Preceding station	JR East	Following station
Akitashirakami towards Higashi-Noshiro	Gonō Line Rapid	Jūniko One-way operation
Akitashirakami towards Higashi-Noshiro	Gonō Line Local	Ōmagoshi towards Hirosaki
Location
- Location within Akita Prefecture Location within Japan

Iwadate Station (岩館駅, Iwadate-eki) is a railway station in the town of Happō, Akita Prefecture, Japan. It is operated by the East Japan Railway Company (JR East).

== Lines ==
Iwadate Station is served by the Gonō Line and is located 29.1 rail kilometers from the southern terminus of the line at Higashi-Noshiro.

== Station layout ==
The station has two opposed side platforms connected by a level crossing, serving two tracks. It is administered by Noshiro Station, and operated by JR Akita Total Life Service Co., Ltd. Ordinary tickets, express tickets, and reserved-seat tickets are on sale for all JR lines.

== History ==
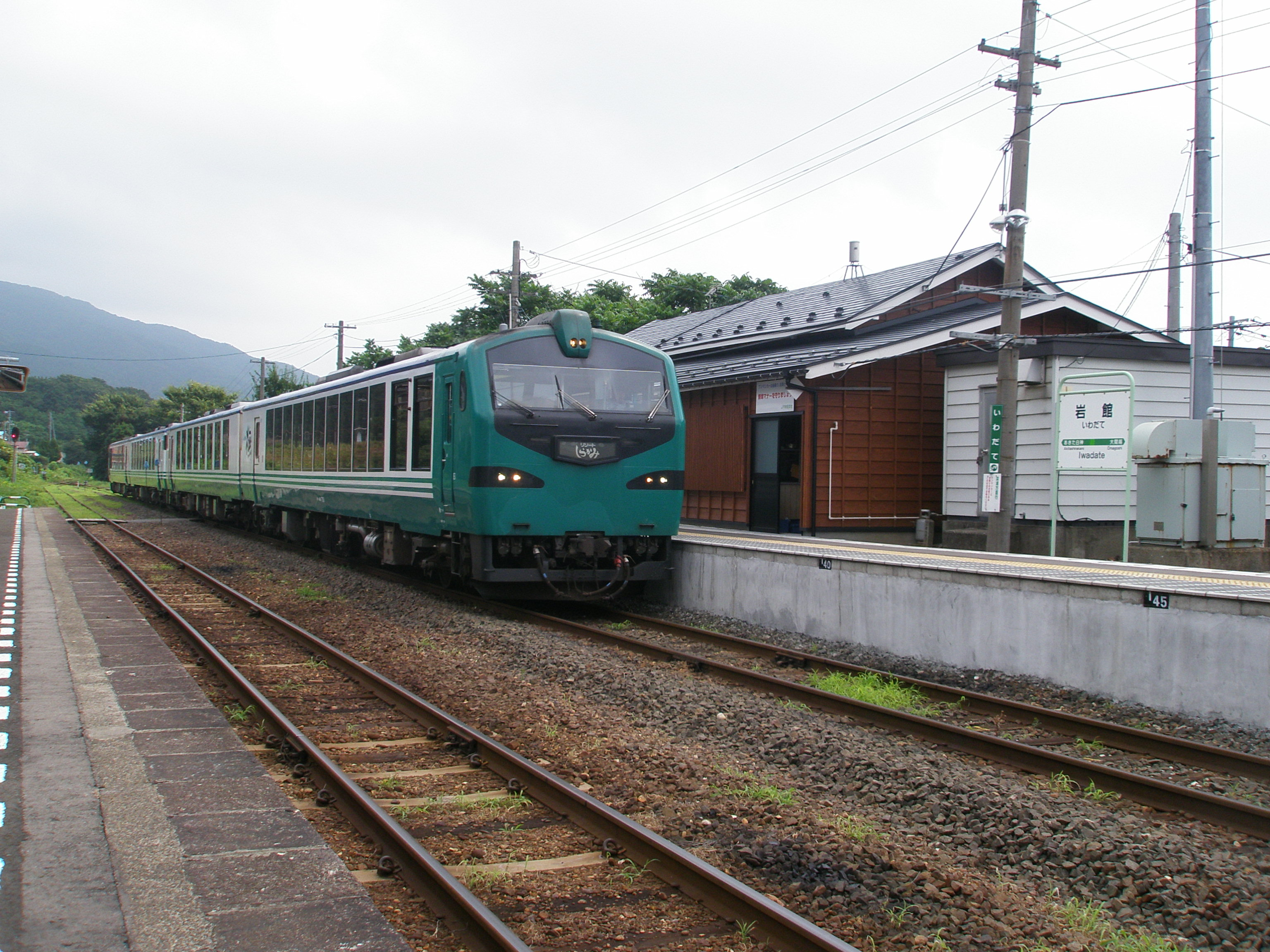
The Resort Shirakami diesel train at Iwadate Station, August 2011

Iwadate Station was opened on 24 November 1926. With the privatization of the JNR on April 1, 1987, the station has been managed by JR East.

== Passenger statistics ==
In fiscal 2016, the station was used by an average of 26 passengers daily (boarding passengers only).

== Surrounding area ==
- National Route 101
- Iwadate Post office

== See also ==
- List of railway stations in Japan
