= Gonō Line =

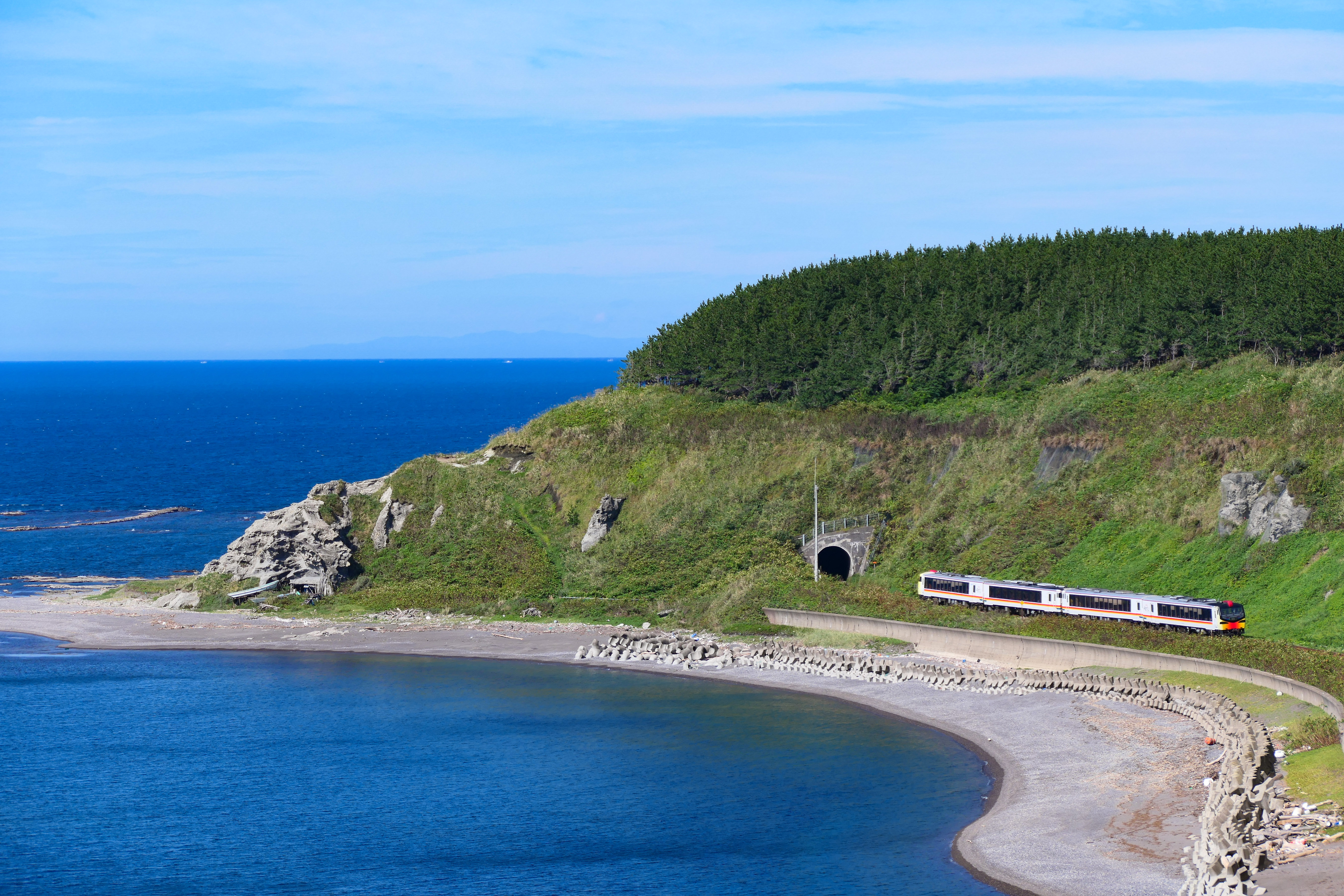
- Gono Line

Overview
- Native name: 五能線
- Status: In operation
- Owner: JR East
- Locale: Aomori, Akita prefectures
- Termini: Higashi-Noshiro; Kawabe
- Stations: 43

Service
- Type: Heavy rail
- Operator(s): JR East
- Rolling stock: GV-E400 series DMU, HB-E300 series DMU

History
- Opened: 1908; 118 years ago

Technical
- Line length: 147.2 km (91.5 mi)
- Number of tracks: Single track
- Character: Rural and scenic
- Track gauge: 1,067 mm (3 ft 6 in)
- Electrification: None
- Operating speed: 85 km/h (53 mph)
Route map

The Gonō Line (五能線, Gonō-sen) is a railway line in Japan linking Higashi-Noshiro Station in Akita Prefecture with Kawabe Station in Aomori Prefecture, in the northern Tōhoku region of Honshu. The line stretches 147.2 km (91.5 mi) along the Sea of Japan coast with a total of 43 stations. The Gonō Line is operated by East Japan Railway Company (JR East).

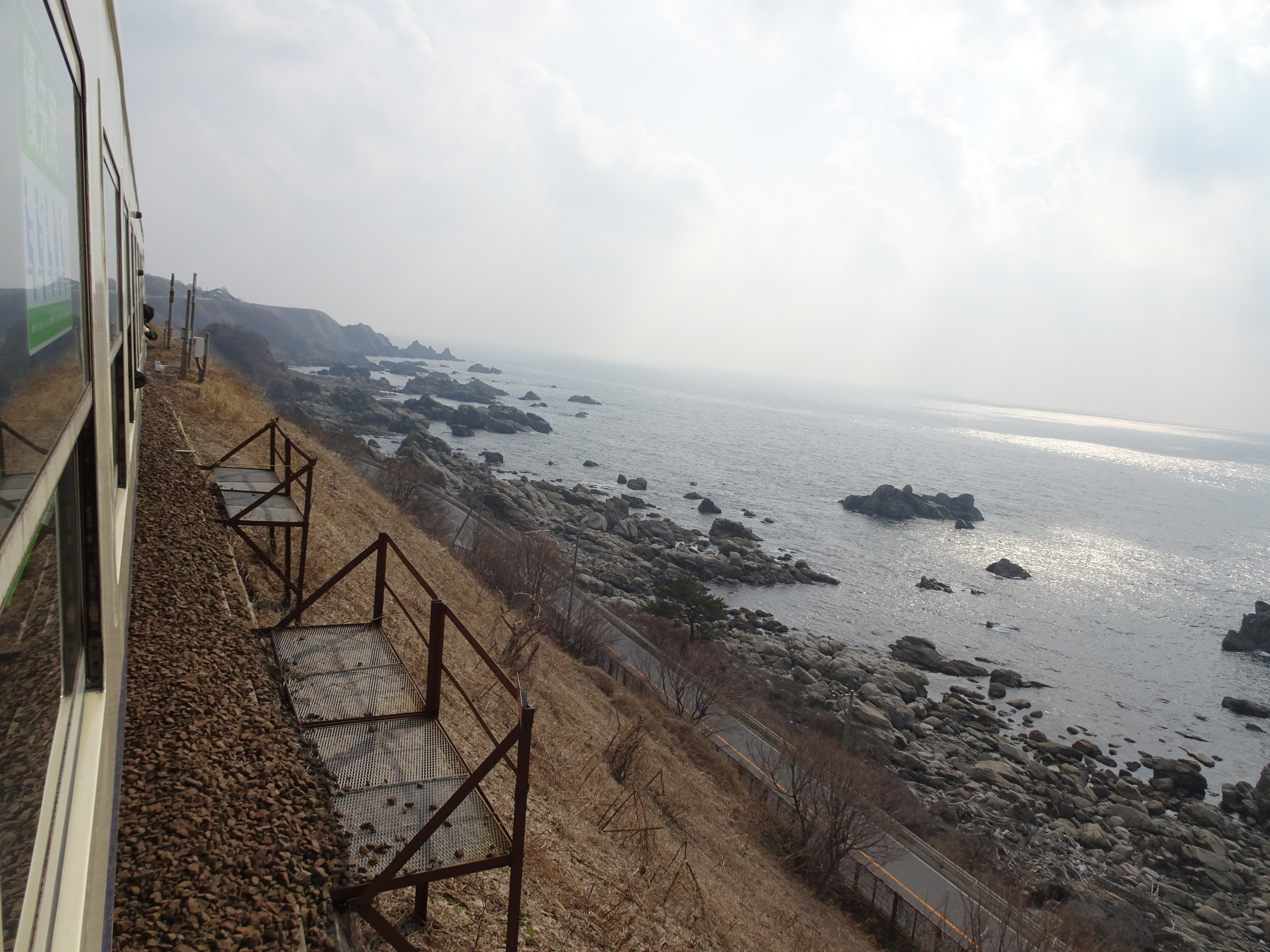
The scenery from the train window

== Station list ==
- For the Resort Shirakami rapid service, please see its article.
- Trains may pass at stations marked "◇", "v", or "^".

Station	Japanese	Distance (km)			Transfers		Location	
Station	Japanese	Between stations	Total	Rapid	Transfers		Location	
Higashi-Noshiro	東能代	-	0.0	●	■ Ōu Main Line	v	Noshiro	Akita
Noshiro	能代	3.9	3.9	●		◇	Noshiro	Akita
Mukai-Noshiro	向能代	2.2	6.1	↑		｜	Noshiro	Akita
Kita-Noshiro	北能代	3.2	9.3	↑		｜	Noshiro	Akita
Torigata	鳥形	1.9	11.2	↑		｜	Noshiro	Akita
Sawame	沢目	2.9	14.1	↑		｜	Happō, Yamamoto District	Akita
Higashi-Hachimori	東八森	3.9	18.0	↑		｜	Happō, Yamamoto District	Akita
Hachimori	八森	4.7	22.7	↑		｜	Happō, Yamamoto District	Akita
Takinoma	滝ノ間	1.8	24.5	↑		｜	Happō, Yamamoto District	Akita
Akitashirakami	あきた白神	1.6	26.1	●		｜	Happō, Yamamoto District	Akita
Iwadate	岩館	3.0	29.1	●		◇	Happō, Yamamoto District	Akita
Ōmagoshi	大間越	10.8	39.9	↑		｜	Fukaura, Nishitsugaru District	Aomori
Shirakamidaketozanguchi	白神岳登山口	2.4	42.3	↑		｜	Fukaura, Nishitsugaru District	Aomori
Matsukami	松神	2.4	44.7	↑		｜	Fukaura, Nishitsugaru District	Aomori
Jūniko	十二湖	1.9	46.6	●		｜	Fukaura, Nishitsugaru District	Aomori
Mutsu-Iwasaki	陸奥岩崎	4.3	50.9	↑		｜	Fukaura, Nishitsugaru District	Aomori
Mutsu-Sawabe	陸奥沢辺	2.7	53.6	↑		｜	Fukaura, Nishitsugaru District	Aomori
WeSPa-Tsubakiyama	ウェスパ椿山	2.4	56.0	●		｜	Fukaura, Nishitsugaru District	Aomori
Henashi	艫作	1.9	57.9	↑		｜	Fukaura, Nishitsugaru District	Aomori
Yokoiso	横磯	3.5	61.4	↑		｜	Fukaura, Nishitsugaru District	Aomori
Fukaura	深浦	5.5	66.9	●		◇	Fukaura, Nishitsugaru District	Aomori
Hiroto	広戸	3.9	70.8	↑		｜	Fukaura, Nishitsugaru District	Aomori
Oirase	追良瀬	2.1	72.9	↑		｜	Fukaura, Nishitsugaru District	Aomori
Todoroki	驫木	3.1	76.0	↑		｜	Fukaura, Nishitsugaru District	Aomori
Kasose	風合瀬	3.0	79.0	↑		｜	Fukaura, Nishitsugaru District	Aomori
Ōdose	大戸瀬	4.9	83.9	↑		｜	Fukaura, Nishitsugaru District	Aomori
Senjōjiki	千畳敷	2.1	86.0	●		｜	Fukaura, Nishitsugaru District	Aomori
Kita-Kanegasawa	北金ヶ沢	4.6	90.6	●		◇	Fukaura, Nishitsugaru District	Aomori
Mutsu-Yanagita	陸奥柳田	2.7	93.3	↑		｜	Fukaura, Nishitsugaru District	Aomori
Mutsu-Akaishi	陸奥赤石	4.1	97.4	↑		｜	Ajigasawa, Nishitsugaru District	Aomori
Ajigasawa	鰺ヶ沢	6.4	103.8	●		◇	Ajigasawa, Nishitsugaru District	Aomori
Narusawa	鳴沢	4.5	108.3	●		｜	Ajigasawa, Nishitsugaru District	Aomori
Koshimizu	越水	2.7	111.0	●		｜	Tsugaru	Aomori
Mutsu-Morita	陸奥森田	3.4	114.5	●		｜	Tsugaru	Aomori
Nakata	中田	2.4	116.9	●		｜	Tsugaru	Aomori
Kizukuri	木造	2.6	119.5	●		｜	Tsugaru	Aomori
Goshogawara	五所川原	5.2	125.7	●	■ Tsugaru Railway Line (Tsugaru-Goshogawara)	◇	Goshogawara	Aomori
Mutsu-Tsuruda	陸奥鶴田	6.0	131.7	●		｜	Tsuruta, Kitatsugaru District	Aomori
Tsurudomari	鶴泊	2.4	134.1	●		｜	Tsuruta, Kitatsugaru District	Aomori
Itayanagi	板柳	4.8	138.9	●		◇	Itayanagi, Kitatsugaru District	Aomori
Hayashizaki	林崎	3.0	141.9	●		｜	Fujisaki, Minamitsugaru District	Aomori
Fujisaki	藤崎	2.8	144.7	●		｜	Fujisaki, Minamitsugaru District	Aomori
Kawabe	川部	2.5	147.2	●	■ Ōu Main Line	^	Inakadate, Minamitsugaru District	Aomori
Most trains have through service to Hirosaki station on the Ōu Main Line

== Rolling stock ==
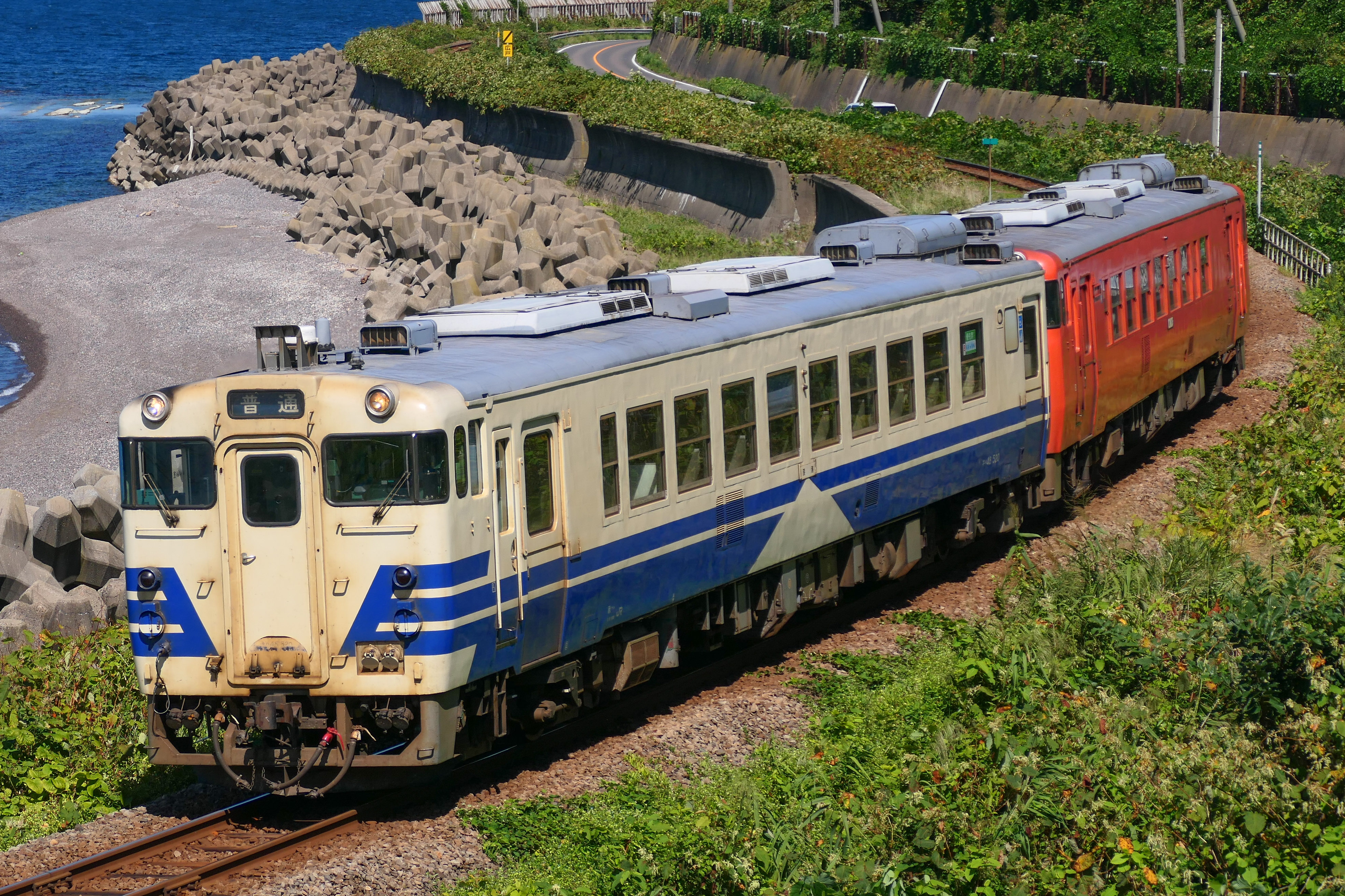
Kiha 40 series

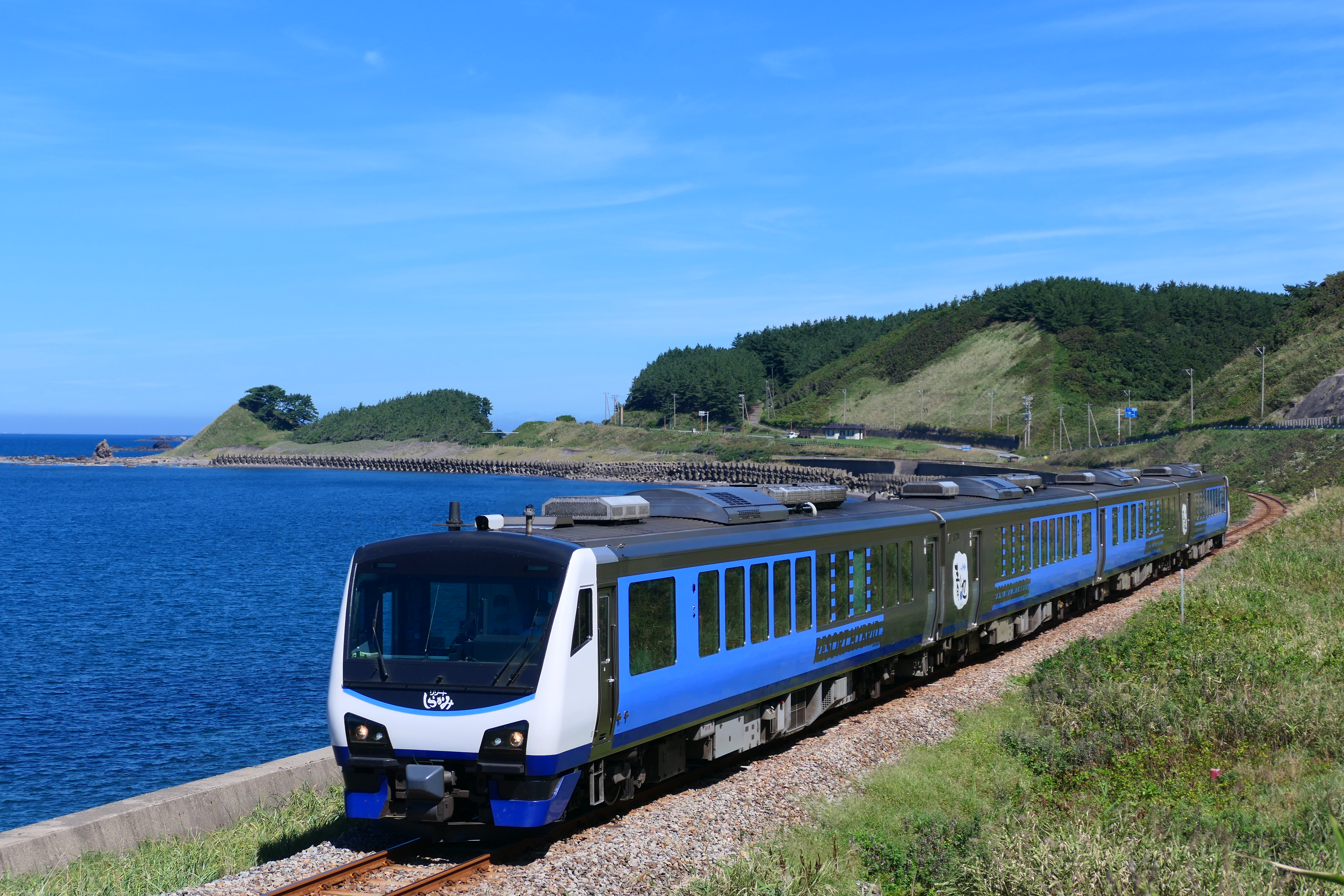
HB-E300 series "Resort Shirakami"

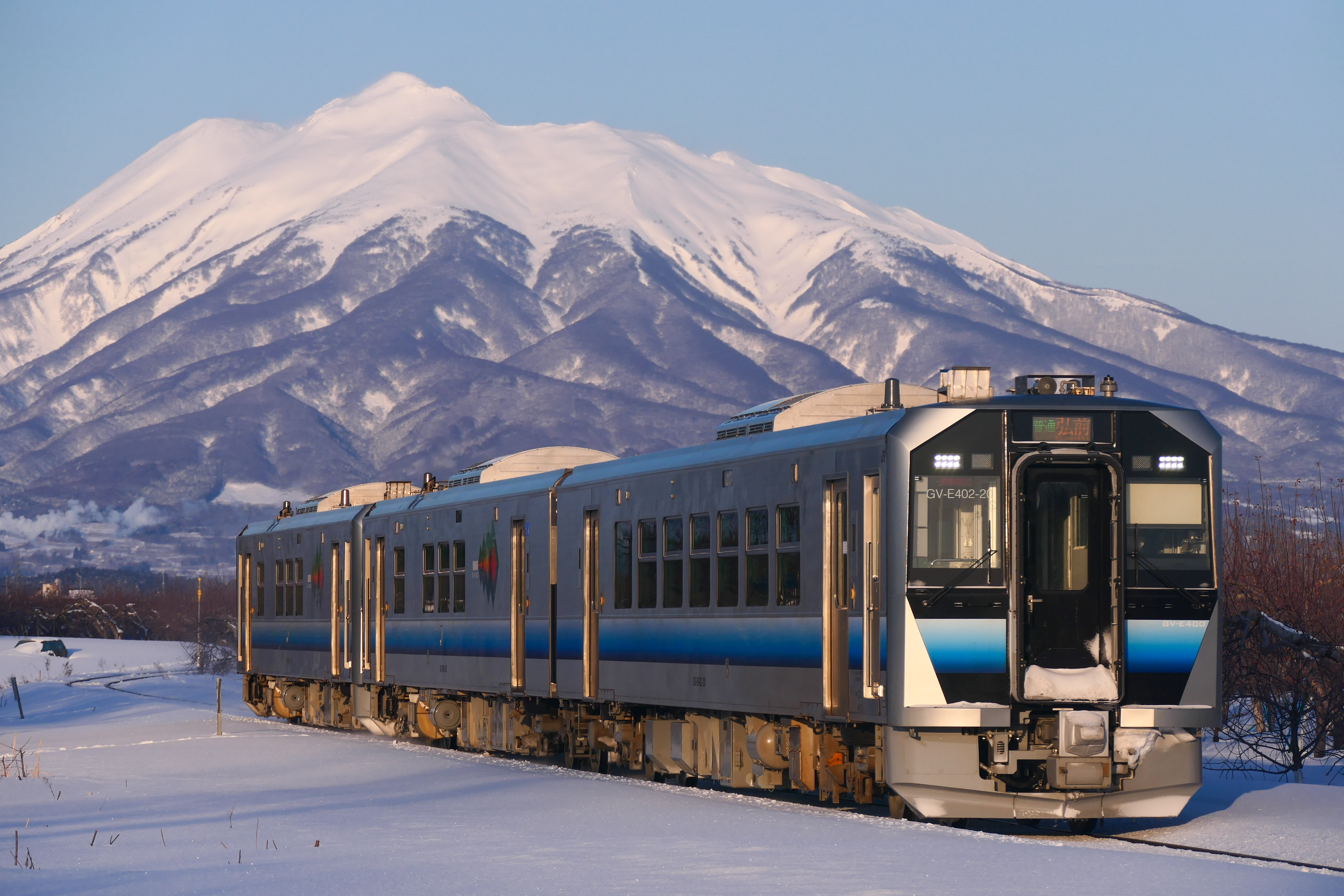
GV-E400 series
- KiHa 40 series DMU
- HB-E300 series DMU
- GV-E400 series DMU

== History ==
The first section of the Gonō Line was opened by the Japanese Government Railways (JGR) from Higashi-Noshiro to Noshiro in 1908. When every JGR railway line was assigned a line name on October 12, 1909, this short railway was named the Noshiro Line (能代線, Noshiro-sen). In 1926 it was extended to Iwadate and in 1932 extended to Mutsu-Iwasaki.

The private Mutsu Railway (陸奥鉄道, Mutsu-tetsudō) began operations on September 25, 1918 linking Kawabe with Goshogawara. The line was extended to Mutsu-Morita on October 21, 1924 with the extension called the Goshogawara Line (五所川原線, Goshogawara-sen). The line was extended to Ajigasawa on May 15, 1925. The company was nationalized in 1927, with the Goshogawara Line being absorbed into the Mutsu Railway. The line was extended to Mutsu-Akaishi on November 26, 1929 and connected to the Gonō Line on July 30, 1936, at which time the entire line adopted its current name.

A CTC system was installed in 1986. With the privatization of the Japanese National Railways (successor of JGR) on April 1, 1987, the Gonō Line came under the control of the East Japan Railway Company (JR East).

== See also ==
- List of railway lines in Japan
