= Fukaura Station =

Railway station in Fukaura, Aomori Prefecture, Japan

Fukaura Station 深浦駅
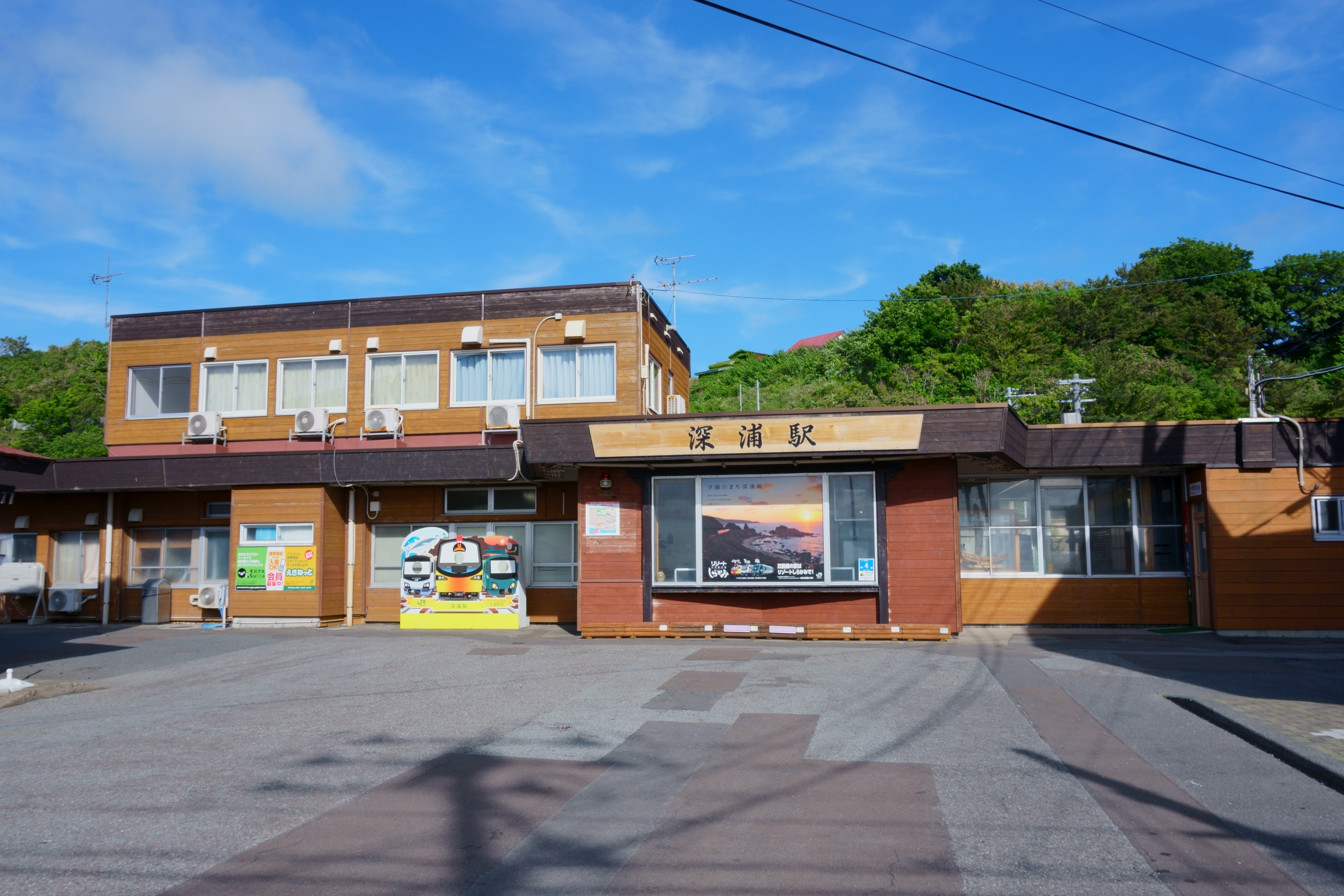
- Fukaura Station in June 2020

General information
- Location: Fukaura, Fukaura-machi, Nishitsugaru-gun, Aomori-ken 038-2324; Japan
- Coordinates: 40°39′00.86″N 139°55′45.74″E
- Operator: JR East
- Line: ■ Gonō Line
- Distance: 66.9 km from Higashi-Noshiro
- Platforms: 1 island platform
- Tracks: 2

Other information
- Status: Staffed (Midori no Madoguchi )
- Website: Official website

History
- Opened: December 13, 1934

Passengers
- FY2016: 66 daily

Services
Preceding station	JR East	Following station
WeSPa-Tsubakiyama towards Higashi-Noshiro	Gonō Line Rapid	Senjōjiki One-way operation
Yokoiso towards Higashi-Noshiro	Gonō Line Local	Hiroto towards Hirosaki
Location
- Location within Japan

Fukaura Station (深浦駅, Fukaura-eki) is a railway station on the Gono Line in the town of Fukaura, Aomori Prefecture, Japan, operated by the East Japan Railway Company (JR East).

== Lines ==
Fukaura Station is served by the Gonō Line, and is 66.9 kilometers from the southern terminus of the line at Higashi-Noshiro.

== Station layout ==
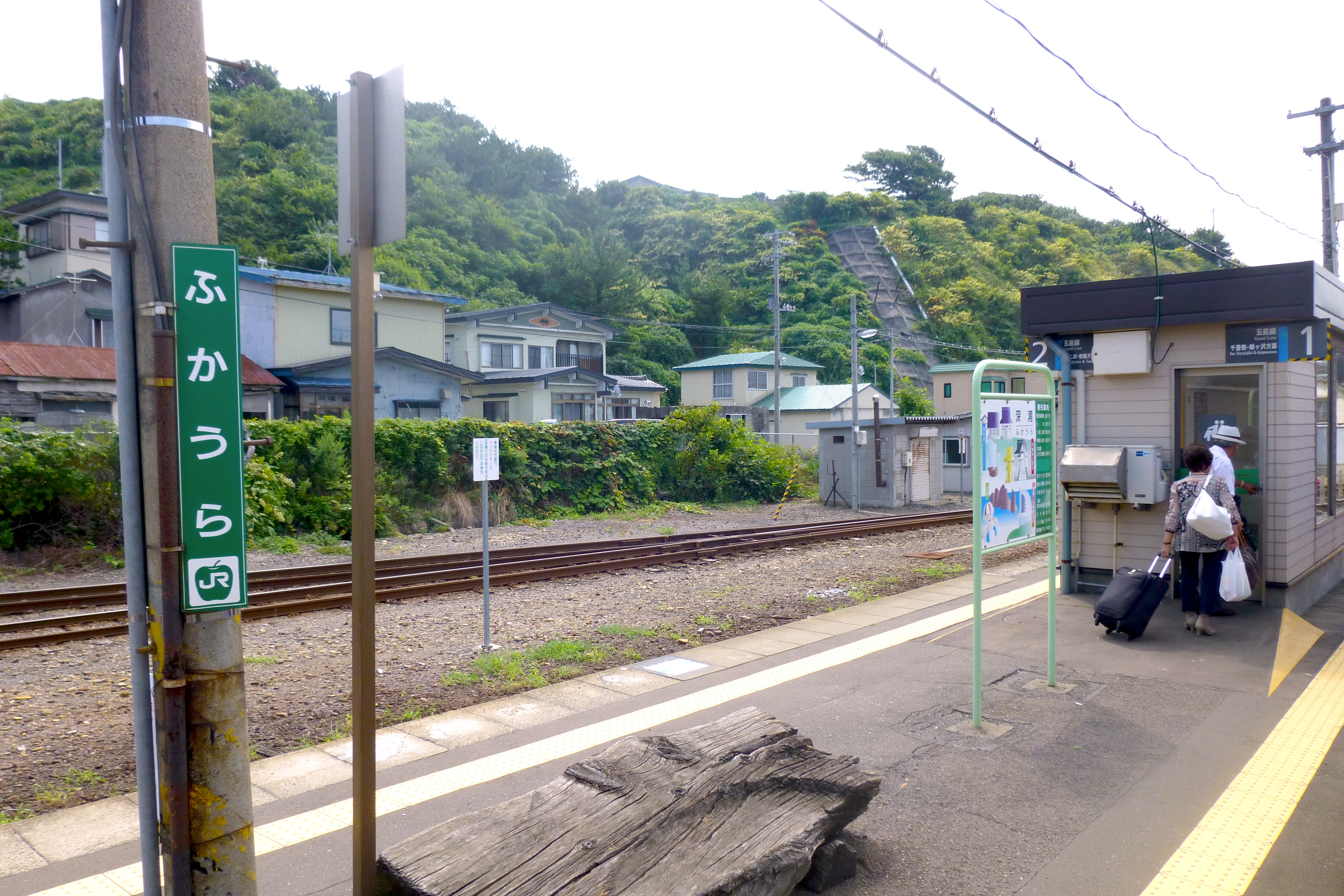
The station platform in August 2012

Fukaura Station has a single ground-level island platform serving two tracks, connected to the station building by a level crossing. The station has a Midori no Madoguchi staffed ticket office.

=== Platforms ===
1	■ Gonō Line	for Ajigasawa, Goshogawara, and Hirosaki
2	■ Gonō Line	for Iwadate and Higashi-Noshiro

== History ==
Fukaura Station was opened on December 13, 1934, as a station on the Japanese National Railways (JNR). With the privatization of JNR on April 1, 1987, it came under the operational control of JR East.

== Passenger statistics ==
In fiscal 2016, the station was used by an average of 66 passengers daily (boarding passengers only).

== Surrounding area ==
- Fukaura town hall
- Fukaura Post Office
- Fukaura Port
- Fukaura Junior High School

== See also ==
- List of railway stations in Japan
