= Higashi-Noshiro Station =

Railway station in Noshiro, Akita Prefecture, Japan

Higashi-Noshiro Station 東能代駅
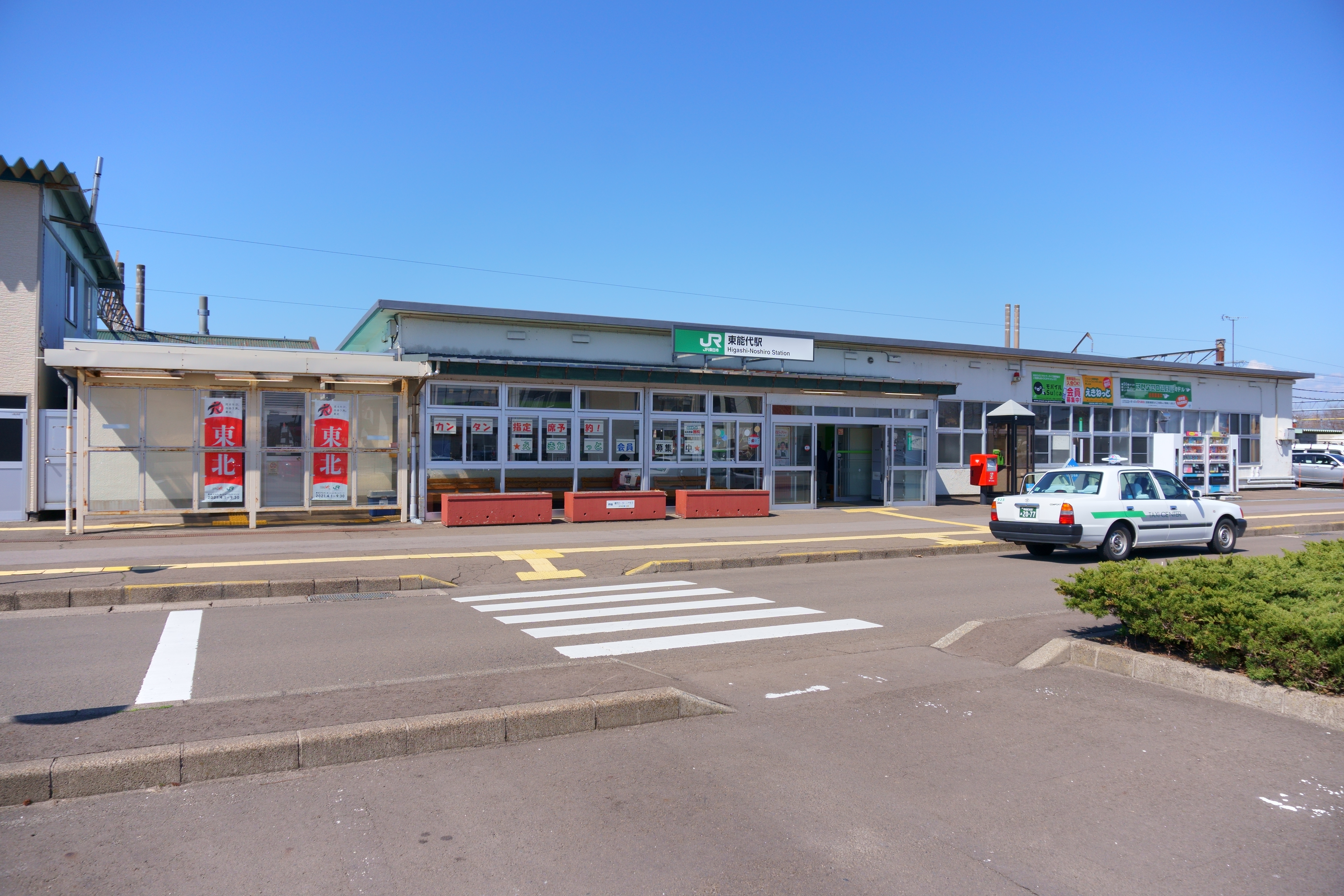
- Higashi-Noshiro Station in April 2021

General information
- Location: Shimoakudo, Kairagefuchi, Noshiro-shi, Akita-ken 016-0121; Japan
- Coordinates: 40°11′29.05″N 140°3′57.33″E
- Operator: JR East; JR Freight
- Lines: ■ Ōu Main Line; ■ Gonō Line
- Distance: 355.4 km from Fukushima
- Platforms: 1 side + 1 island platforms
- Tracks: 3

Other information
- Website: www.jreast.co.jp/estation/station/info.aspx?StationCd=1300

History
- Opened: 1 November 1901
- Former names: Noshiro (until 1909); Hataori (1909 - 1943)

Passengers
- FY2018: 500 daily

Services
| Preceding station | JR East | Following station |
|---|---|---|
| Moritake towards Akita | Tsugaru | Futatsui towards Aomori |
| Moritake towards Akita | Ōu Main Line Rapid | Futatsui towards Aomori |
| Kita-Kanaoka towards Shinjō | Ōu Main Line Local | Tsurugata towards Aomori |
| Terminus | Gonō Line Rapid | Noshiro One-way operation |
| Terminus | Gonō Line Local | Noshiro towards Hirosaki |
Location
- Location within Akita Prefecture Location within Japan

Higashi-Noshiro Station (東能代駅, Higashi-Noshiro-eki) is a junction railway station in the city of Noshiro, Akita, Japan operated by the East Japan Railway Company (JR East). The station is also a freight depot for the Japan Freight Railway Company (JR Freight)

== Lines ==
Higashi-Noshiro is served by the Ōu Main Line and Gonō Line. It is located 355.4 km from the terminus of the Ōu Main Line at Fukushima, and it is the southern terminus of the 147.2 kilometer Gonō Line.

== Station layout ==
The station consists of one side platform and one island platform, connected to the station building by a footbridge. The station has automated ticket machines, Suica automated turnstiles as well as a Midori no Madoguchi staffed ticket office.

=== Platforms ===
| 1 | ■ Ōu Main Line | for Akita and Niigata |
| 2 | ■ Ōu Main Line | for Ōdate and Aomori |
| 2 | ■ Gonō Line | for Iwadate and Fukaura |
| 3 | ■ Gonō Line | for Iwadate and Fukaura |

== History ==
The station opened on November 1, 1901 as Noshiro Station (能代駅). It was renamed Hataori Station (機織駅) on November 1, 1909, and renamed Higashi-Noshiro Station on June 15, 1943. With the privatization of Japanese National Railways (JNR) on April 1, 1987, the station came under the control of JR East.

== Passenger statistics ==
In fiscal 2018, the station was used by an average of 500 passengers daily (boarding passengers only).

== See also ==
- List of railway stations in Japan
