= Water skiing at the 2001 World Games – Men's wakeboard =

Waterskiing men's wakeboard at the 2001 World Games
- Venue: Ogata Water Ski Course, Ogata, Akita, Japan
- Date: 23–25 August 2001
- Competitors: 16 from 11 nations

Medalists
| gold medal | (France) Rodo Vinh-Tung |
| silver medal | (South Africa) Morgan Krause |
| bronze medal | (Italy) Fabrizio Benelli |

The men's wakeboard freestyle competition in water skiing at the 2001 World Games took place from 23 to 25 August 2001 at the Ogata Water Ski Course in Ogata, Akita, Japan.

== Competition format ==
A total of 16 athletes entered the competition. Best three athletes from preliminary heats qualify directly to the final. In last chance qualifiers two athletes also qualifies for the final.

== Results ==
=== Preliminary ===
Heat 1

| Rank | Name | Country | Result | Notes |
|---|---|---|---|---|
| 1 | Rodo Vinh-Tung | France | 65.22 | Q |
| 2 | Morgan Krause | South Africa | 63.22 | Q |
| 3 | Domu Narita | Japan | 57.77 | Q |
| 4 | Hardy Tunnissen | Germany | 46.00 | |
| 5 | Loren Levine | United States | 43.33 | |
| 6 | Matthew Dance | Australia | 40.44 | |
| 7 | Yoshiyuki Hatakeyama | Japan | 40.33 | |
| 8 | Marcello Luca | Italy | 38.66 | |

Heat 2

| Rank | Name | Country | Result | Notes |
|---|---|---|---|---|
| 1 | Fabrizio Bennelli | Italy | 60.66 | Q |
| 2 | Dan Nott | (United Kingdom) Great Britain | 58.66 | Q |
| 3 | Manabu Nagatsuka | Japan | 55.33 | Q |
| 4 | Duncan Zuur | Netherlands | 43.33 | |
| 5 | Richard Whitfield | Australia | 42.33 | |
| 6 | Roger Koa | Singapore | 41.00 | |
| 7 | Jonathan Joseph | South Africa | 26.22 | |
| 8 | Robert Braun | Austria | 14.33 | |

=== Last Chance Qualifiers ===
| Rank | Athlete | Nation | Note |
|---|---|---|---|
| 1 | Loren Levine | United States | Q |
| 2 | Hardy Tunnissen | Germany | Q |
| 3 | Richard Whitfield | Australia | |
| 4 | Duncan Zuur | Netherlands | |

=== Final ===
| Rank | Athlete | Nation | Result |
|---|---|---|---|
| 1st place, gold medalist(s) | Rodo Vinh-Tung | France | 59.55 |
| 2nd place, silver medalist(s) | Morgan Krause | South Africa | 58.44 |
| 3rd place, bronze medalist(s) | Fabrizio Bennelli | Italy | 58.00 |
| 4 | Dan Nott | (United Kingdom) Great Britain | 56.33 |
| 5 | Loren Levine | United States | 51.89 |
| 6 | Hardy Tunnissen | Germany | 51.33 |
| 7 | Manabu Nagatsuka | Japan | 49.33 |
| 8 | Domu Narita | Japan | 18.22 |
