= Water skiing at the 2001 World Games – Women's wakeboard =

Waterskiing women's wakeboard at the 2001 World Games
- Venue: Ogata Water Ski Course, Ogata, Akita, Japan
- Date: 23–25 August 2001
- Competitors: 7 from 4 nations

Medalists
gold medal	(Japan) Mero Narita
silver medal	(Australia) Leza Bugden
bronze medal	(Japan) Kiyomi Suzuki

The women's wakeboard freestyle competition in water skiing at the 2001 World Games took place from 23 to 25 August 2001 at the Ogata Water Ski Course in Ogata, Akita, Japan.

== Competition format ==
A total of 7 athletes entered the competition. Best three athletes from preliminary round qualify to the final.

== Results ==
=== Preliminary ===
Rank	Name	Country	Result	Notes
1	Mero Narita	Japan	50.11	Q
2	Leza Bugden	Australia	47.21	Q
3	Kiyomi Suzuki	Japan	45.88	Q
4	Yoshiko Tasaki	Japan	43.00	
5	Caroline Jansson	Sweden	42.44	
6	Jo Robertson	Australia	41.22	
7	Andrea Fountain	New Zealand	12.22	

=== Final ===
Rank	Athlete	Nation	Result
1st place, gold medalist(s)	Mero Narita	Japan	44.33
2nd place, silver medalist(s)	Leza Bugden	Australia	39.00
3rd place, bronze medalist(s)	Kiyomi Suzuki	Japan	31.77
