= Kotoka =

Kotoka may refer to:

- Emmanuel Kwasi Kotoka, member of the ruling National Liberation Council of Ghana
- Accra International Airport, in Accra, Ghana
- Kotooka, Akita (also transliterated as Kotoka), a town in Yamamoto District, Akita, Japan
