= Koikawa Station =

Koikawa Station is the name of multiple train stations in Japan:

- Koikawa Station (Akita) (鯉川駅) in Akita Prefecture
- Koikawa Station (Yamanashi) (小井川駅) in Yamanashi Prefecture
