= Water skiing at the 2001 World Games – Women's three event =

Waterskiing women's three event at the 2001 World Games
- Venue: Ogata Water Ski Course, Ogata, Akita, Japan
- Date: 23–25 August 2001
- Competitors: 11 from 9 nations

Medalists
gold medal	(Russia) Elena Milakova
silver medal	(Greece) Angeliki Andriopoulou
bronze medal	(United Kingdom) Sarah Gatty Saunt

The women's three event competition in water skiing at the 2001 World Games took place from 23 to 25 August 2001 at the Ogata Water Ski Course in Ogata, Akita, Japan.

== Competition format ==
A total of 11 athletes entered the competition. In this competition athletes compete in three events: slalom, tricks and jump. Best four athletes from preliminary round qualifies to the final.

== Results ==
=== Preliminary ===
Rank	Athlete	Nation	Slalom	Trick	Jump	Overall	Note
1	Rhoni Barton	United States	1,000.00	1,000.00	880.81	2,880.81	Q
2	Elena Milakova	Russia	844.66	966.91	1,000.00	2,811.57	Q
3	Sarah Gatty Saunt	(United Kingdom) Great Britain	1,000.00	745.32	750.00	2,495.32	Q
4	Angeliki Andriopoulou	Greece	990.29	510.79	840.12	2,341.20	Q
5	Maria Botero	Colombia	961.17	595.68	686.05	2,242.90	
6	Klára Čadková	Czech Republic	970.87	624.46	566.86	2,162.19	
7	Sharon van Oye	Netherlands	970.87	542.45	485.47	1,998.79	
8	Kateřina Čadková	Czech Republic	699.03	694.96	409.88	1,803.87	
9	Kim Key-young	South Korea	786.41	299.28	642.44	1,728.13	
10	Shinobu Okasako	Japan	699.03	376.98	159.88	1,235.89	
11	Mari Iwasaki	Japan	9.71	200.00	558.14	767.85	

=== Final ===
Rank	Athlete	Nation	Slalom	Trick	Jump	Overall
1st place, gold medalist(s)	Elena Milakova	Russia	925.93	991.15	1,000.00	2,917.08
2nd place, silver medalist(s)	Angeliki Andriopoulou	Greece	907.41	1,000.00	910.83	2,818.24
3rd place, bronze medalist(s)	Sarah Gatty Saunt	(United Kingdom) Great Britain	1,000.00	859.88	770.70	2,630.58
4	Rhoni Barton	United States	925.93	672.57	882.17	2,480.67
