= Happo =

Happo may refer to:

- Masan, formerly Happo, city in South Korea.
- Happō, Akita, town in Japan.
