= Moritake =

Moritake may refer to:

== People ==
=== Given name ===
- Arakida Moritake (荒木田 守武, 1473–1549), Japanese poet
- Moritake Tanabe (田辺 盛武, 1889–1949), general in the Imperial Japanese Army during World War II
- Moritake Tomikawa (富川 盛武, born 1948), vice-governor of Okinawa Prefecture

=== Surname ===
- Tomoko Moritake (森武 知子, born 1938), Miss Universe Japan in 1958

== Places ==
- Moritake Station a railway station on the JR East in Mitane (formerly Yamamoto), Japan
