= Water skiing at the 2001 World Games – Women's barefoot three event =

Waterskiing women's barefoot three event at the 2001 World Games
- Venue: Ogata Water Ski Course, Ogata, Akita, Japan
- Date: 23–25 August 2001
- Competitors: 7 from 7 nations

Medalists
gold medal	(South Africa) Nadine de Villiers
silver medal	(United States) Rachel George
bronze medal	(Norway) Kirsten Grønvik

The women's barefoot three event competition in water skiing at the 2001 World Games took place from 23 to 25 August 2001 at the Ogata Water Ski Course in Ogata, Akita, Japan.

== Competition format ==
A total of 7 athletes entered the competition. In this competition athletes compete in three events: slalom, tricks and jump. Best five athletes from preliminary round qualifies to the final.

== Results ==
=== Preliminary ===
Rank	Athlete	Nation	Slalom	Trick	Jump	Overall	Note
1	Nadine de Villiers	South Africa	1,000.00	1,000.00	1,000.00	3,000.00	Q
2	Rachel George	United States	581.40	985.71	812.87	2,379.98	Q
3	Kirsten Grønvik	Norway	488.37	547.62	614.04	1,650.03	Q
4	Svenja Hempelmann	Germany	290.70	419.05	578.95	1,288.70	Q
5	Clare Angilley	Australia	104.65	400.00	491.23	995.88	Q
6	Brenda Groen	New Zealand	488.37	314.29	0.00	802.66	
7	Mai Kuhara	Japan	0.00	71.43	0.00	71.43	

=== Finals ===
Slalom

Rank	Athlete	Nation	Result
1	Nadine de Villiers	South Africa	1,000.00
2	Rachel George	United States	531.91
3	Kirsten Grønvik	Norway	500.00
4	Svenja Hempelmann	Germany	446.81
5	Brenda Groen	New Zealand	265.96

Tricks

Rank	Athlete	Nation	Result
1	Nadine de Villiers	South Africa	1,000.00
2	Rachel George	United States	672.41
3	Kirsten Grønvik	Norway	416.67
4	Svenja Hempelmann	Germany	252.87
5	Clare Angilley	Australia	241.38

Jump

Rank	Athlete	Nation	Result
1	Nadine de Villiers	South Africa	1,000.00
2	Rachel George	United States	812.87
3	Kirsten Grønvik	Norway	884.21
4	Svenja Hempelmann	Germany	578.95
5	Clare Angilley	Australia	491.23

Overall

Rank	Athlete	Nation	Result
1st place, gold medalist(s)	Nadine de Villiers	South Africa	3,000.00
2nd place, silver medalist(s)	Rachel George	United States	2,017.19
3rd place, bronze medalist(s)	Kirsten Grønvik	Norway	1,600.88
4	Svenja Hempelmann	Germany	1,097.78
5	Clare Angilley	Australia	828.35
