= Hachiryū, Akita =

Dissolved municipality in Akita prefecture, Japan

Hachiryū (八竜町, Hachiryū-machi) was a town located in Yamamoto District, Akita Prefecture, Japan.

As of 2003, the town has an estimated population of 7,145 and a density of 184.82 persons per km^{2}. The total area is 38.66 km^{2}.

On March 20, 2006, Hachiryū, along with the towns of Koto'oka and Yamamoto (all from Yamamoto District), was merged to create the town of Mitane.
