= Torigata Station =

Railway station in Noshiro, Akita Prefecture, Japan

Torigata Station 鳥形駅
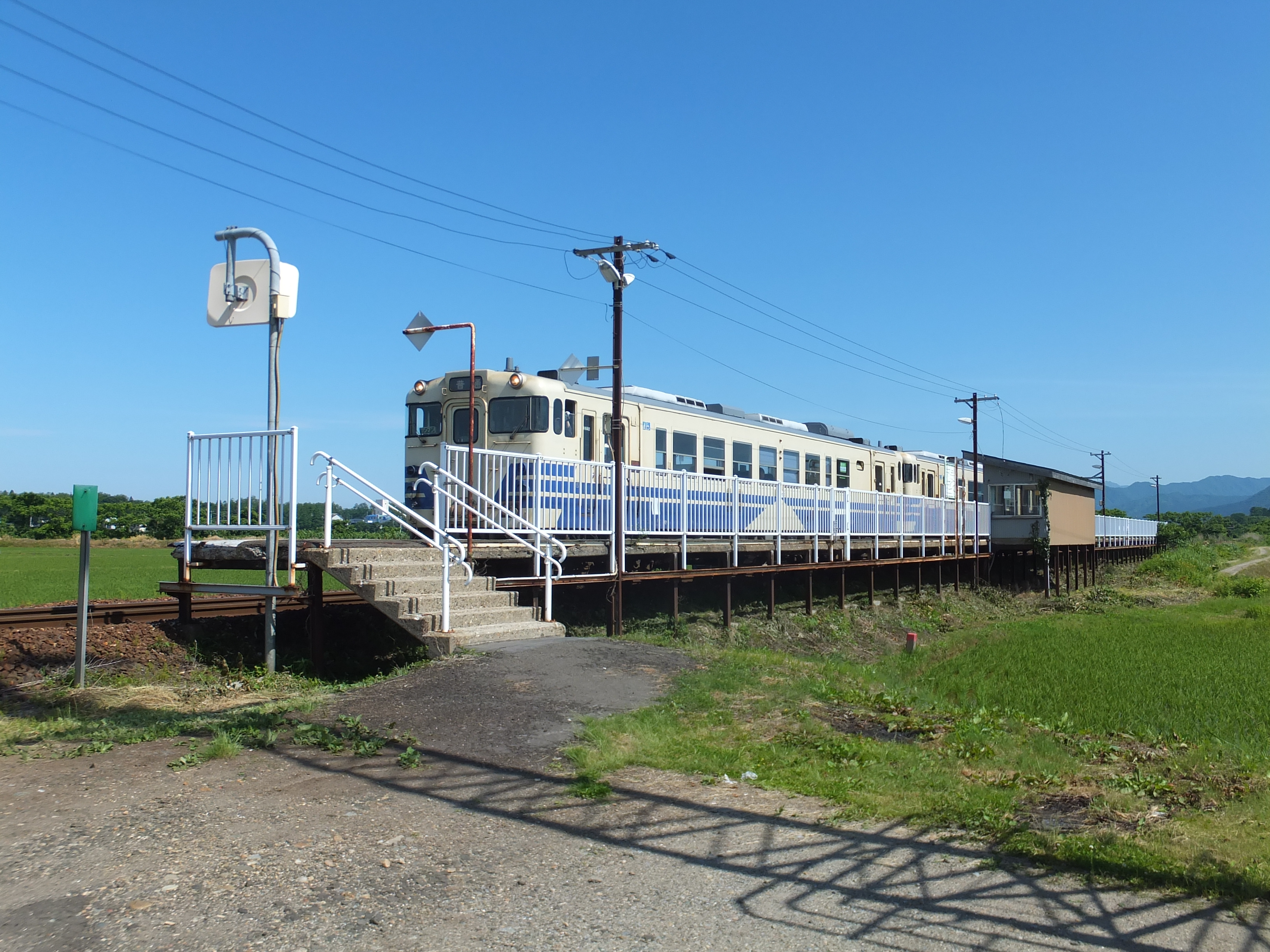
- Torigata Station, June 2017

General information
- Location: Torigata Sakagata, Noshiro-shi, Akita-ken 016-0011; Japan
- Coordinates: 40°16′17.2″N 140°2′12.9″E
- Operator: JR East
- Line: ■ Gonō Line
- Distance: 11.2 kilometers from Higashi-Noshiro
- Platforms: 1 side platform

Other information
- Status: Unstaffed
- Website: Official website

History
- Opened: December 1, 1960

Services
Preceding station	JR East	Following station
Kita-Noshiro towards Higashi-Noshiro	Gonō Line Local	Sawame towards Hirosaki
Location
- Location within Akita Prefecture Location within Japan

Torigata Station (鳥形駅, Torigata-eki) is a railway station located in the city of Noshiro, Akita Prefecture, Japan, operated by East Japan Railway Company (JR East).

== Lines ==
Torigata Station is served by the Gonō Line and is located 11.2 rail kilometers from the southern terminus of the line at Higashi-Noshiro.

== Station layout ==
Torigata Station one side platform, serving a single bidirectional track. There is no station building, but only a shelter built onto the platform. The unattended station is managed from Noshiro Station.

== History ==
Torigata Station was opened on December 1, 1960 as a station on the JNR (Japan National Railways). With the privatization of the JNR on April 1, 1987, the station has been managed by JR East.

== Surrounding area ==
- National Route 101
