= Higashi-Hachimori Station =

Railway station in Happō, Akita Prefecture, Japan

Higashi-Hachimori Station 東八森駅
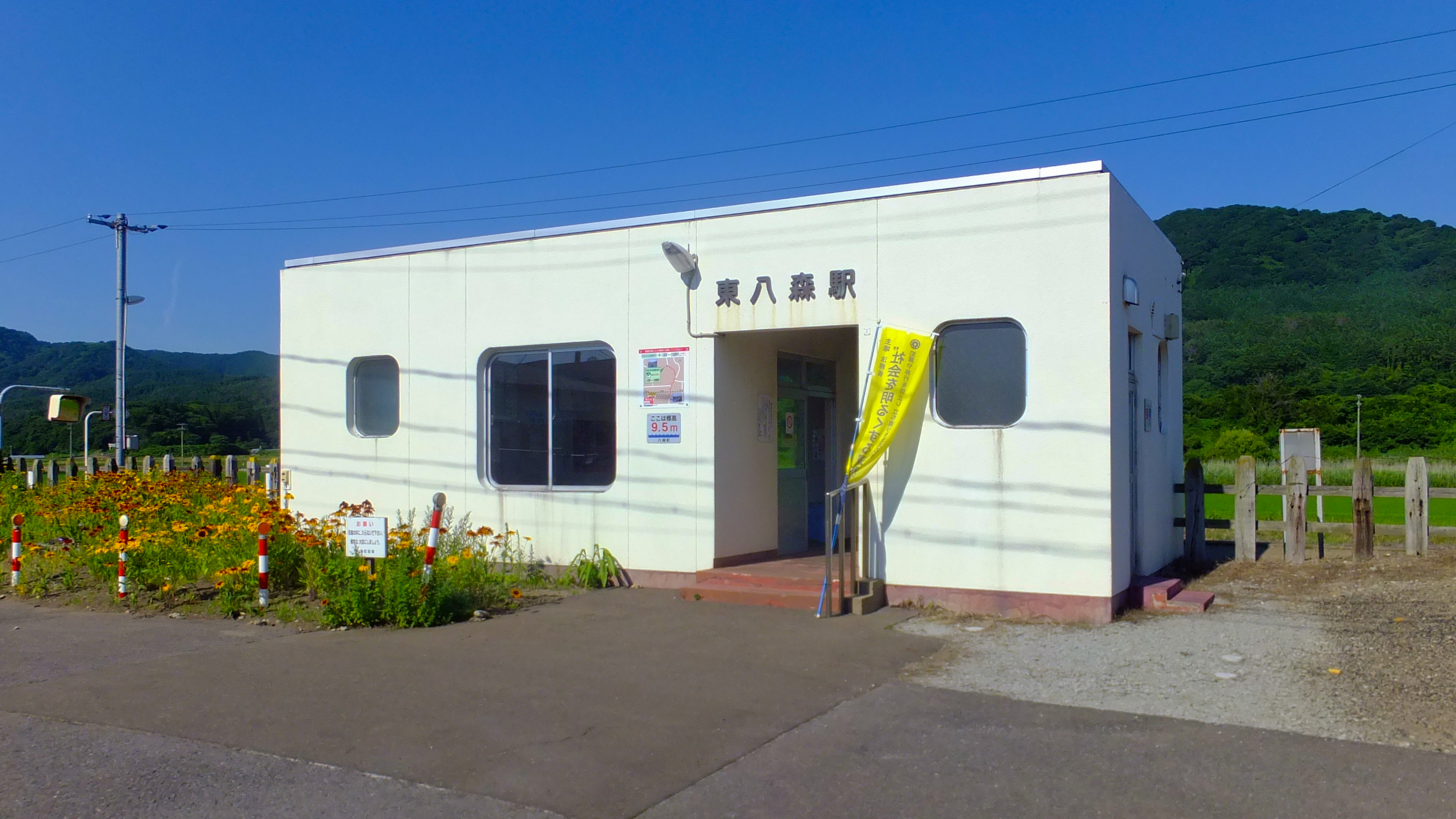
- Higashi-Hachimori Station in July 2017

General information
- Location: Hachimori-aze Kameuego 142, Happō-cho, Yamamoto-gun, Akita-ken 018-2674; Japan
- Coordinates: 40°19′55.7″N 140°1′56.8″E
- Operator: JR East
- Line: ■ Gonō Line
- Distance: 18.0 km from Higashi-Noshiro
- Platforms: 1 side platform
- Tracks: 1

Other information
- Website: Official website

History
- Opened: April 26, 1926
- Former names: Hachimori (until 1959)

Services
Preceding station	JR East	Following station
Sawame towards Higashi-Noshiro	Gonō Line Local	Hachimori towards Hirosaki
Location
- Location within Akita Prefecture Location within Japan

Higashi-Hachimori Station (東八森駅, Higashi-Hachimori-eki) is a railway station located in the town of Happō, Akita Prefecture, Japan, operated by East Japan Railway Company (JR East).

== Lines ==
Higashi-Hachimori Station is served by the 147.2 km (91.5 mi) Gonō Line, and is located 18.0 kilometers from the southern terminus of the line at Higashi-Noshiro Station.

== Station layout ==
The station has one side platform serving a single bidirectional track. The unattended station is managed from Noshiro Station.

== History ==
Higashi-Hachimori Station was opened on April 26, 1926 as Hachimori Station (八森駅) on the Japanese Government Railways (JGR) serving the village of Hachimori, Akita. The JGR became the JNR (Japan National Railways) after World War II. The station was renamed to its present name on October 1, 1959. With the privatization of the JNR on April 1, 1987, the station has been managed by JR East.

== Surrounding area ==
- National Route 101
- former Hachimori town hall

== See also ==
- List of railway stations in Japan
