= Hachimori, Akita =

Coordinates: 40°19′N 140°02′E

Hachimori 八森町
- Former settlement
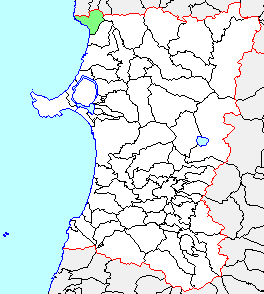
- Interactive map of Hachimori
- Country: Japan
- Prefecture: Akita
- District: Yamamoto

Hachimori (八森町, Hachimori-machi) was a town located in Yamamoto District, Akita Prefecture, Japan.

As of 2003, the town had an estimated population of 4,494 and a density of 39.90 persons per km^{2}. The total area was 112.62 km^{2}.

On March 27, 2006, Hachimori, along with the village of Minehama (also from Yamamoto District), was merged to create the town of Happō.
