= Takinoma Station =

Railway station in Happō, Akita Prefecture, Japan

Takinoma Station 滝ノ間駅
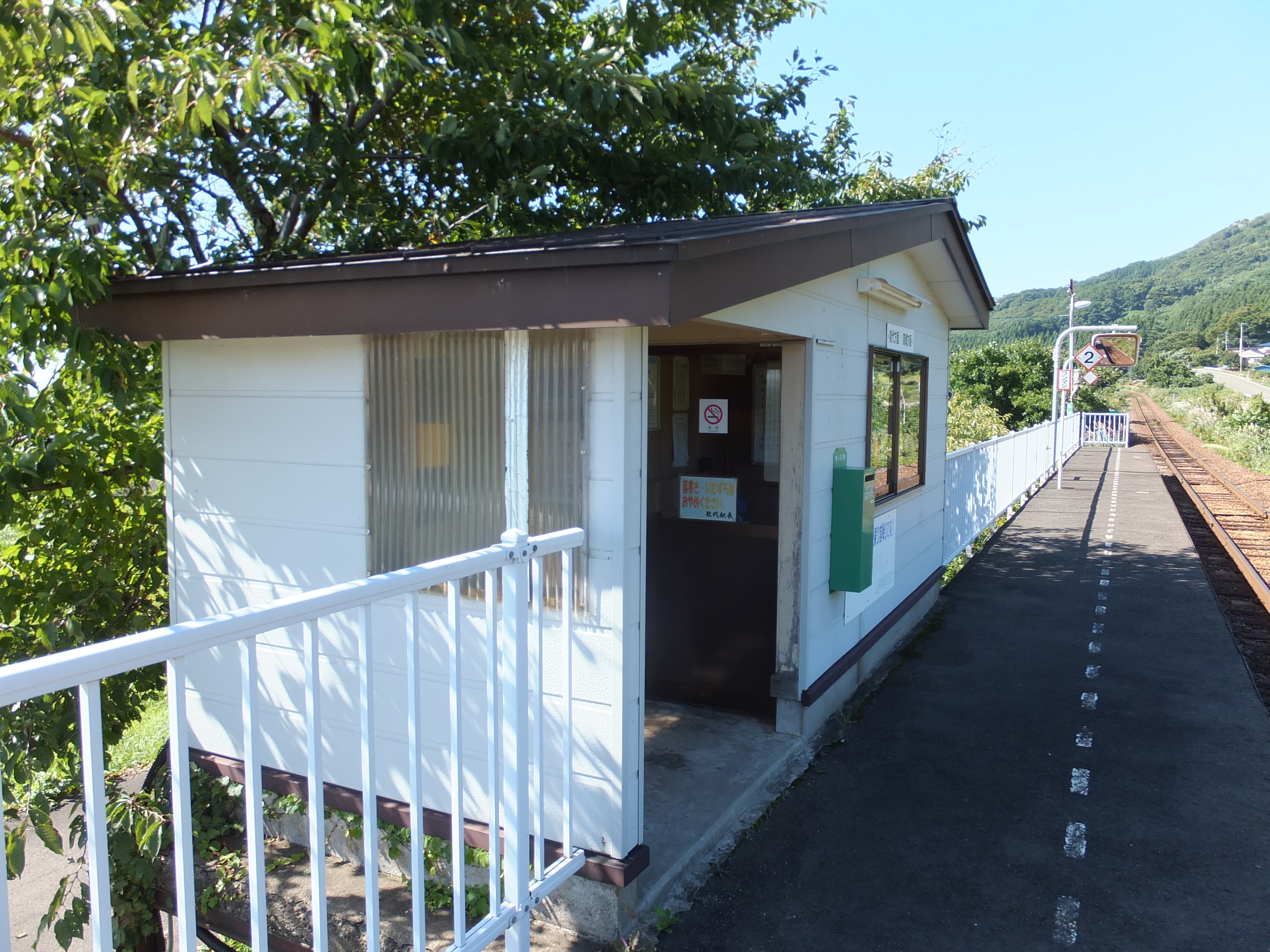
- Takinoma Station. August 2013

General information
- Location: Hachimori-aze Takinoma 93, Happō-cho, Akita-ken 018-2623; Japan
- Coordinates: 40°22′47.7″N 140°0′8.1″E
- Operator: JR East
- Line: ■ Gonō Line
- Distance: 24.5 km from Higashi-Noshiro
- Platforms: 1 side platform
- Tracks: 1

Other information
- Website: Official website

History
- Opened: April 20, 1963

Services
Preceding station	JR East	Following station
Hachimori towards Higashi-Noshiro	Gonō Line Local	Akitashirakami towards Hirosaki
Location
- Location within Akita Prefecture Location within Japan

Takinoma Station (滝ノ間駅, Takinoma-eki) is a railway station located in the town of Happō, Akita Prefecture, Japan, operated by East Japan Railway Company (JR East).

== Lines ==
Takinoma Station is served by the 147.2 km (91.5 mi) Gonō Line, and is located 24.5 kilometers from the southern terminus of the line at Higashi-Noshiro Station.

== Station layout ==
The station has one side platform serving a single bidirectional track. The unattended station is managed from Fukaura Station.

== History ==
Takinoma Station was opened on April 20, 1963. With the privatization of the JNR on April 1, 1987, the station has been managed by JR East.

== Surrounding area ==
- National Route 101

== See also ==
- List of railway stations in Japan
