= Kado Station =

Railway station in Mitane, Akita Prefecture, Japan

Kado Station 鹿渡駅
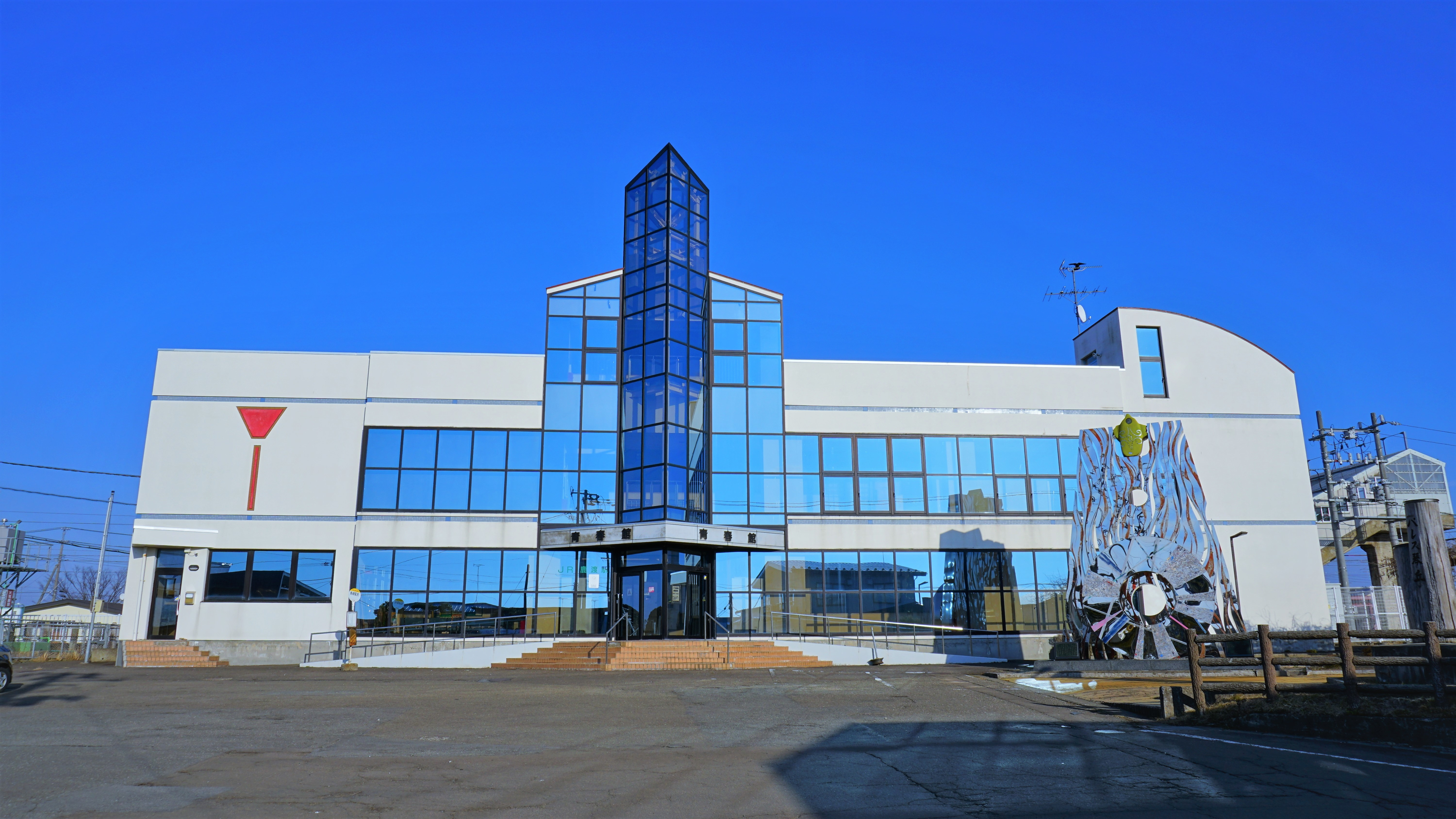
- Kado Station (3 March 2019)

General information
- Location: Higashinihonyanagi Kado, Mitane-sho, Yamamoto-gun, Akita-ken 018-2104; Japan
- Coordinates: 40°2′40.69″N 140°4′57.25″E
- Operator: JR East
- Line: ■ Ōu Main Line
- Distance: 338.4 km from Fukushima
- Platforms: 2 side platforms
- Tracks: 2

Other information
- Status: Staffed
- Website: Official website

History
- Opened: August 1, 1902

Passengers
- FY2018: 135 daily

Services
Preceding station	JR East	Following station
Koikawa towards Shinjō	Ōu Main Line Local	Moritake towards Aomori
Location
- Location within Akita Prefecture Location within Japan

Kado Station (鹿渡駅, Kado-eki)is a railway station in the town of Mitane, Yamamoto District, Akita Prefecture, Japan, operated by East Japan Railway Company (JR East).

== Lines ==
Kado Station is served by the Ōu Main Line, and is located 338.4 km from the terminus of the line at Fukushima Station.

== Station layout ==
Kado Station has one side platform and one island platform serving three tracks, connected by a footbridge. Track 2 is used primarily for freight trains changing direction. Kado Station is a simple consignment station, administered by Higashi-Noshiro Station, and operated by Mitane municipal authority, with point-of-sales terminal installed. Ordinary tickets, express tickets, and reserved-seat tickets for all JR lines are on sale (no connecting tickets).

=== Platforms ===
1	■ Ōu Main Line	for Higashi-Noshiro and Hirosaki
2	■ Ōu Main Line	freight train siding
3	■ Ōu Main Line	for Akita and Ōmagari

== History ==
Kado Station was opened on August 1, 1902 as a station on the Japanese Government Railways (JGR), serving the town of Kado, Akita. The JGR became the JNR (Japan National Railways) after World War II. The station was absorbed into the JR East network upon the privatization of the JNR on April 1, 1987.

== Passenger statistics ==
In fiscal 2018, the station was used by an average of 135 passengers daily (boarding passengers only).

== Surrounding area ==
- National Route 7
- Kotooka Post Office
- Kotooka Junior High School

== See also ==
- List of railway stations in Japan
