= Hachimori Station =

Railway station in Happō, Akita Prefecture, Japan

Hachimori Station 八森駅
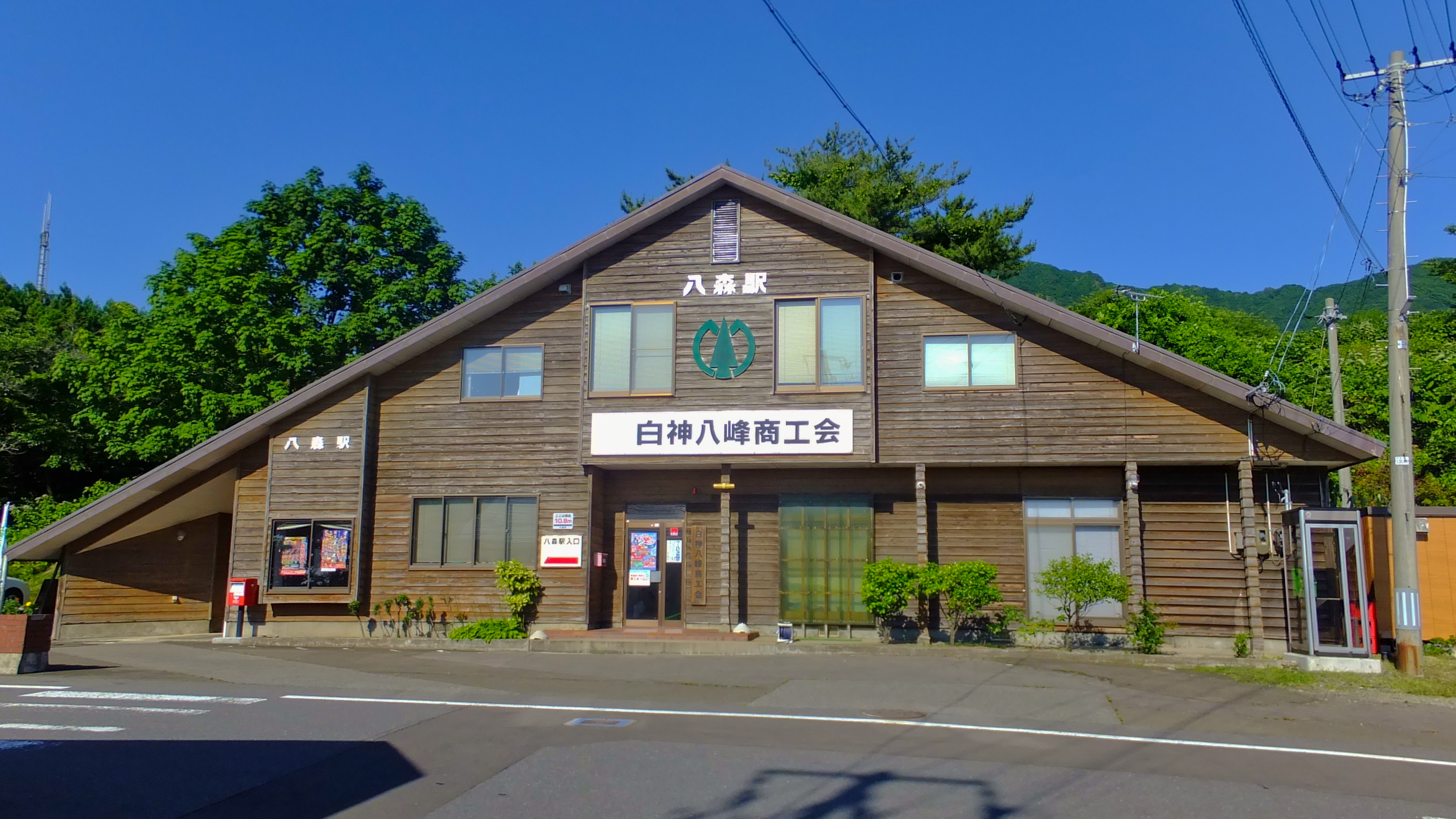
- Hachimori Station, July 2017

General information
- Location: Hachimori Nakahama 41-3, Happō-cho, Akita-ken 018-2641; Japan
- Coordinates: 40°22′16.8″N 140°1′4.4″E
- Operator: JR East
- Line: ■ Gonō Line
- Distance: 22.7 km from Higashi-Noshiro
- Platforms: 1 side platform
- Tracks: 1

Other information
- Website: Official website

History
- Opened: April 26, 1926
- Former names: Tsubaki (until 1959)

Services
Preceding station	JR East	Following station
Higashi-Hachimori towards Higashi-Noshiro	Gonō Line Local	Takinoma towards Hirosaki
Location

Hachimori Station (八森駅, Hachimori-eki) is a railway station located in the town of Happō, Akita Prefecture, Japan, operated by East Japan Railway Company (JR East).

== Lines ==
Hachimori Station is served by the 147.2 km (91.5 mi) Gonō Line, and is located 22.7 kilometers from the southern terminus of the line at Higashi-Noshiro Station.

== Station layout ==
The station has a single island platform; however, only one side of the platform is in use, serving bidirectional traffic. The unattended station is managed from Noshiro Station.

=== Platforms ===
1	■ Gonō Line	for Iwadate and Fukaura for Higashi-Noshiro

== History ==
Hachimori Station was opened on April 26, 1926 as Tsubaki Station (椿駅) on the Japanese Government Railways (JGR) serving the village of Hachimori, Akita. The JGR became the JNR (Japan National Railways) after World War II. The station was renamed to its present name on November 1, 1959. A new station building was completed in 1985. With the privatization of the JNR on April 1, 1987, the station has been managed by JR East. The station has been unattended since 1990.

== Surrounding area ==
- Hachimori Elementary School
- Hachimori Post Office

== See also ==
- List of railway stations in Japan
