= Akitashirakami Station =

Railway station in Happō, Akita Prefecture, Japan

Akitashirakami Station あきた白神駅
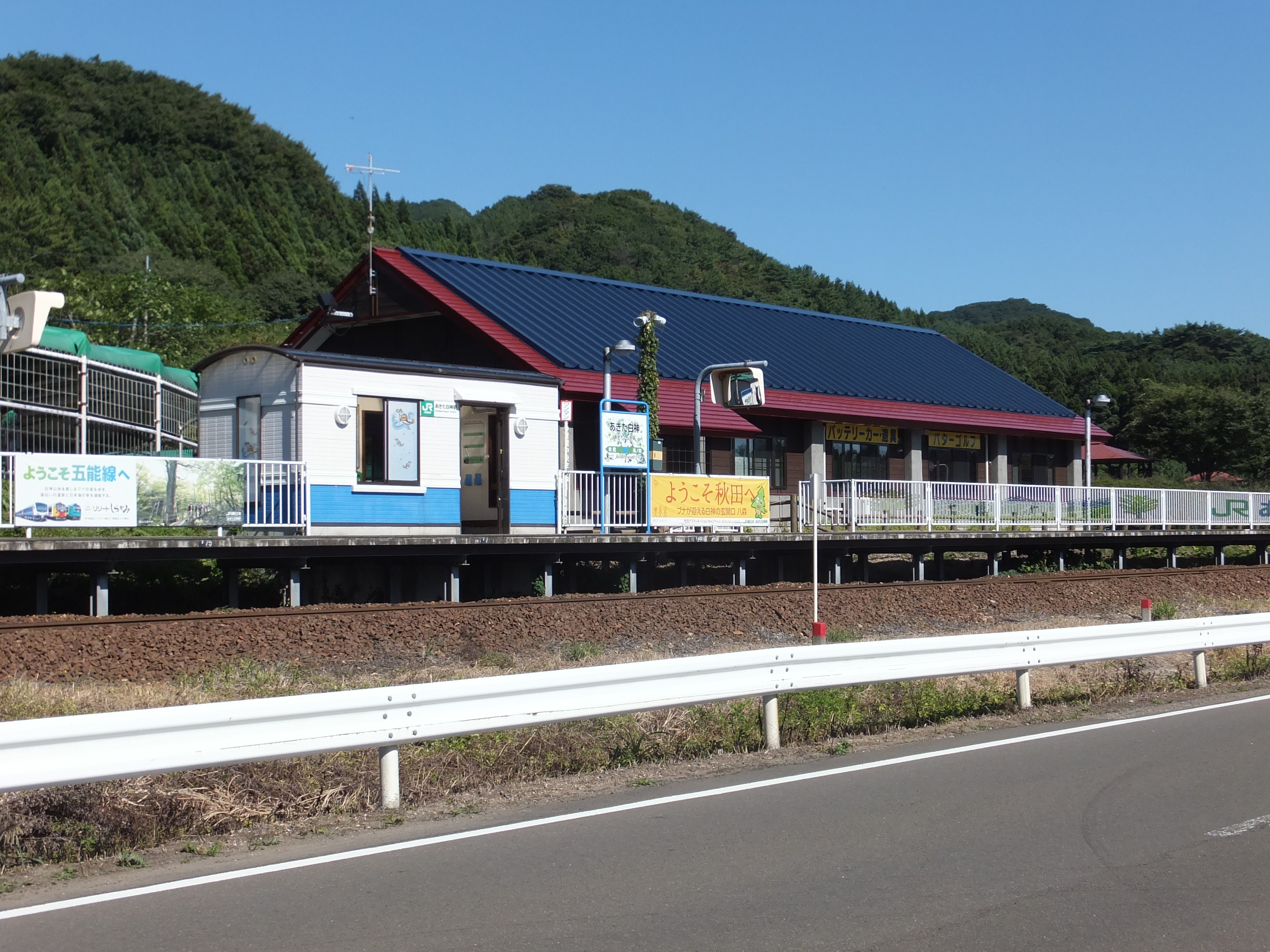
- Akitashirakami Station in September 2013

General information
- Location: Gosho-no-dai, Hachimori-aze, Happōchō, Yamamoto-gun, Akita-ken 018-2617; Japan
- Coordinates: 40°23′11.8″N 139°59′15.6″E
- Operator: JR East
- Line: ■ Gonō Line
- Distance: 26.1 km from Higashi-Noshiro
- Platforms: 1 side platform
- Tracks: 1

Other information
- Website: Official website

History
- Opened: 1 October 1997

Passengers
- FY2018: 38 daily

Services
Preceding station	JR East	Following station
Noshiro towards Higashi-Noshiro	Gonō Line Rapid	Iwadate One-way operation
Takinoma towards Higashi-Noshiro	Gonō Line Local	Iwadate towards Hirosaki
Location
- Location within Akita Prefecture Location within Japan

Akitashirakami Station (あきた白神駅, Akita-Shirakami-eki) is a railway station located in the town of Happō, Akita Prefecture, Japan, operated by East Japan Railway Company (JR East).

== Lines ==
Akitashirakami Station is served by the 147.2 km (91.5 mi) Gonō Line and is located 26.1 kilometers from the southern terminus of the line at Higashi-Noshiro Station.

== Station layout ==
The station has a single side platform serving a single bidirectional track. The station is staffed.

== History ==
Akitashirakami Station opened on October 1, 1997.

== Passenger statistics ==
In fiscal 2018, the station was used by an average of 38 passengers daily (boarding passengers only). The passenger figures for previous years are as shown below.

Fiscal year	Daily average
2000	7
2005	7
2010	30
2015	27

== Surrounding area ==
- National Route 101
- Hachimori Isaribi onsen

== See also ==
- List of railway stations in Japan
