= Akita Prefectural University =

University in Akita Prefecture, Japan

Coordinates: 39°23′36″N 140°04′23″E

- 秋田県立大学
- Type: Public
- Established: 1999
- Location: Yurihonjō, Akita and Ōgata, Akita Prefecture, Japan
- Website: http://www.akita-pu.ac.jp/index.htm

Akita Prefectural University (秋田県立大学, Akita kenritsu daigaku) is a Japanese prefectural university, located in Akita City, Japan.

== History ==
Akita Prefectural University was established in 1999, annexing the Akita Prefectural Junior College of Agriculture (established in 1973), the same year. The university initially offered degrees in Systems like Technology, Biological and Environmental Science. In 2002, a graduate studies program was established.

== Organization ==
=== Undergraduate ===
- Systems Science and Technology Faculty (Honjo Campus)
  - Department of Mechanical and Intelligent Systems
    - Material Structural Engineering
    - Thermal and Fluid Engineering
    - Mechatronics and Bio-Mechanics
  - Department of Electronics and Information Systems
    - Electronic Systems Engineering
    - Electronic Devices and Materials
    - Information systems
  - Department of Architecture and Environment Systems
    - Structure Laboratory (building construction science)
    - Materials Laboratory (Building Materials Science)
    - Environmental Laboratory (Environmental Planning Studies)
    - Planning Laboratory (architecture and urban amenities Group)
    - Management Systems Engineering
    - Management Systems Engineering
- Biological resources Sciences (Akita Campus, Ogata Campus)
  - Applied Biological Sciences
  - Biological production Science
  - Biological and Environmental Sciences
  - Agribusiness

=== Graduate program ===
- Graduate School of Systems Science and Technology,
  - Master's course
    - Mechanical and Intelligent Systems
    - Electronics and Information Systems
    - Architecture and Environment Systems
    - Management Systems Engineering
    - Joint Life Cycle Engineering Design
  - Doctoral Program
    - General Systems Science
- Biological resources Sciences
  - Biological resources Sciences

== Locations ==
- Honjō Campus in Yurihonjō
- Akita Campus, in Akita City
- Ōgata Campus in Ōgata
- Noshiro Advanced Wood Processing Institute in Noshiro
