= Koikawa Station (Akita) =

Railway station in Mitane, Akita Prefecture, Japan

Koikawa Station 鯉川駅
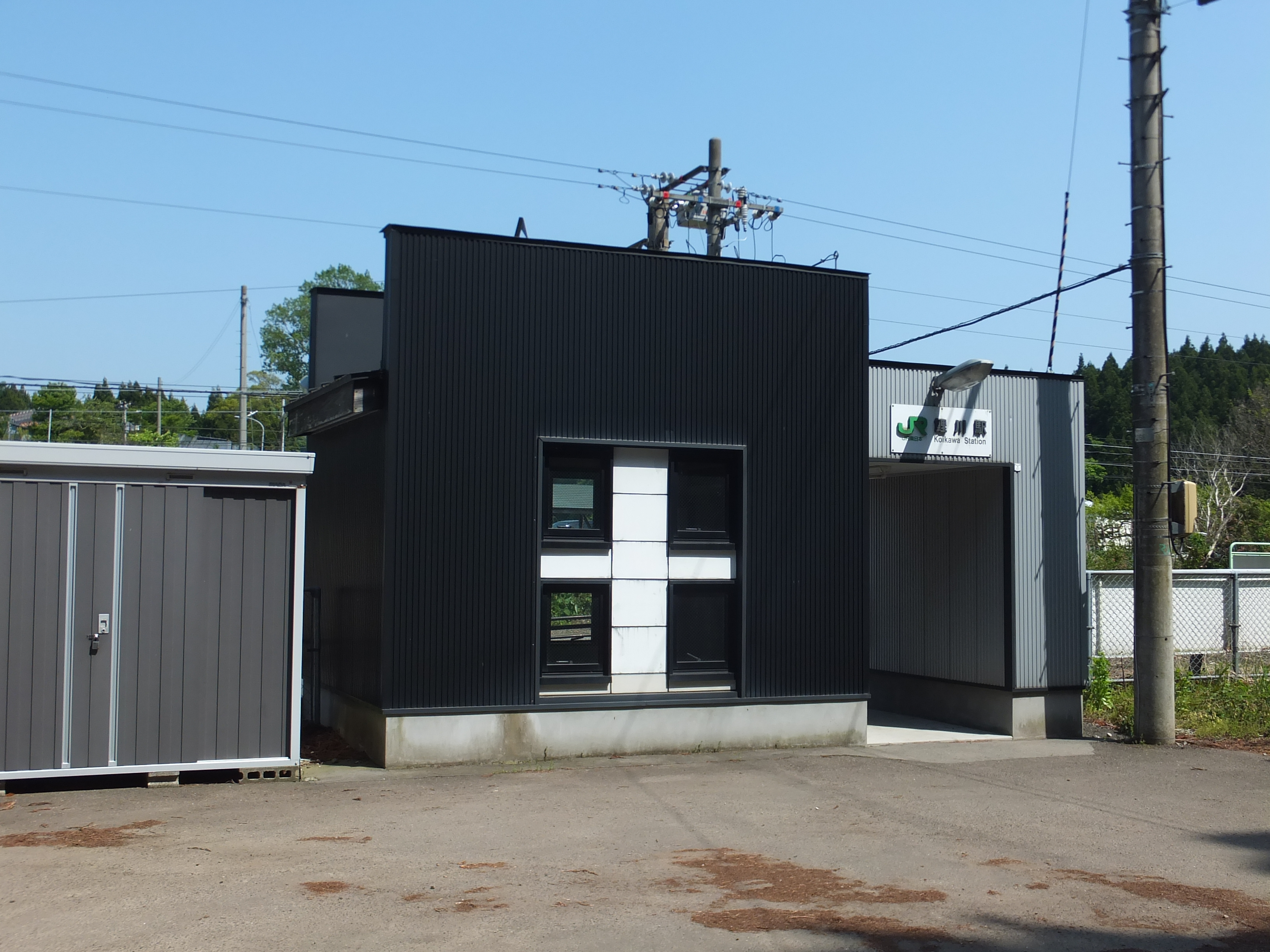
- Koikawa Station (May 20, 2017)

General information
- Location: Ofukane Koikawa, Mitane-cho, Yamamoto-gun, Akita-ken 018-2103; Japan
- Coordinates: 39°59′47.08″N 140°4′38.87″E
- Operator: JR East
- Line: ■ Ōu Main Line
- Distance: 333.0 km from Fukushima
- Platforms: 2 side platforms
- Tracks: 2

Other information
- Status: Unstaffed
- Website: Official website

History
- Opened: February 1, 1950

Services
Preceding station	JR East	Following station
Hachirōgata towards Shinjō	Ōu Main Line Local	Kado towards Aomori
Location
- Location within Akita Prefecture Location within Japan

Koikawa Station (鯉川駅, Koikawa-eki) is a railway station in the town of Mitane, Yamamoto District, Akita Prefecture, Japan, operated by East Japan Railway Company (JR East).

== Lines ==
Koikawa Station is served by the Ōu Main Line, and is located 333.0 km from the terminus of the line at Fukushima Station.

== Station layout ==
Koikawa Station consists of two opposed side platforms connected by a footbridge. The station is unattended.

=== Platforms ===
1	■ Ōu Main Line	for Higashi-Noshiro and Hirosaki
2	■ Ōu Main Line	for Akita and Ōmagari

== History ==
Koikawa Station began as Koikawa Signal Stop (鯉川信号場) on September 30, 1944, and was elevated to a full station on the Japan National Railway (JNR), serving the town of Kado, Akita on February 1, 1950. It has been unattended since October 1971. The station was absorbed into the JR East network upon the privatization of the JNR on April 1, 1987. A new station building was completed in July 2007.

== Surrounding area ==
- National Route 7

== See also ==
- List of railway stations in Japan
