= Kita-Kanaoka Station =

Railway station in Mitane, Akita Prefecture, Japan

Kita-Kanaoka Station 北金岡駅
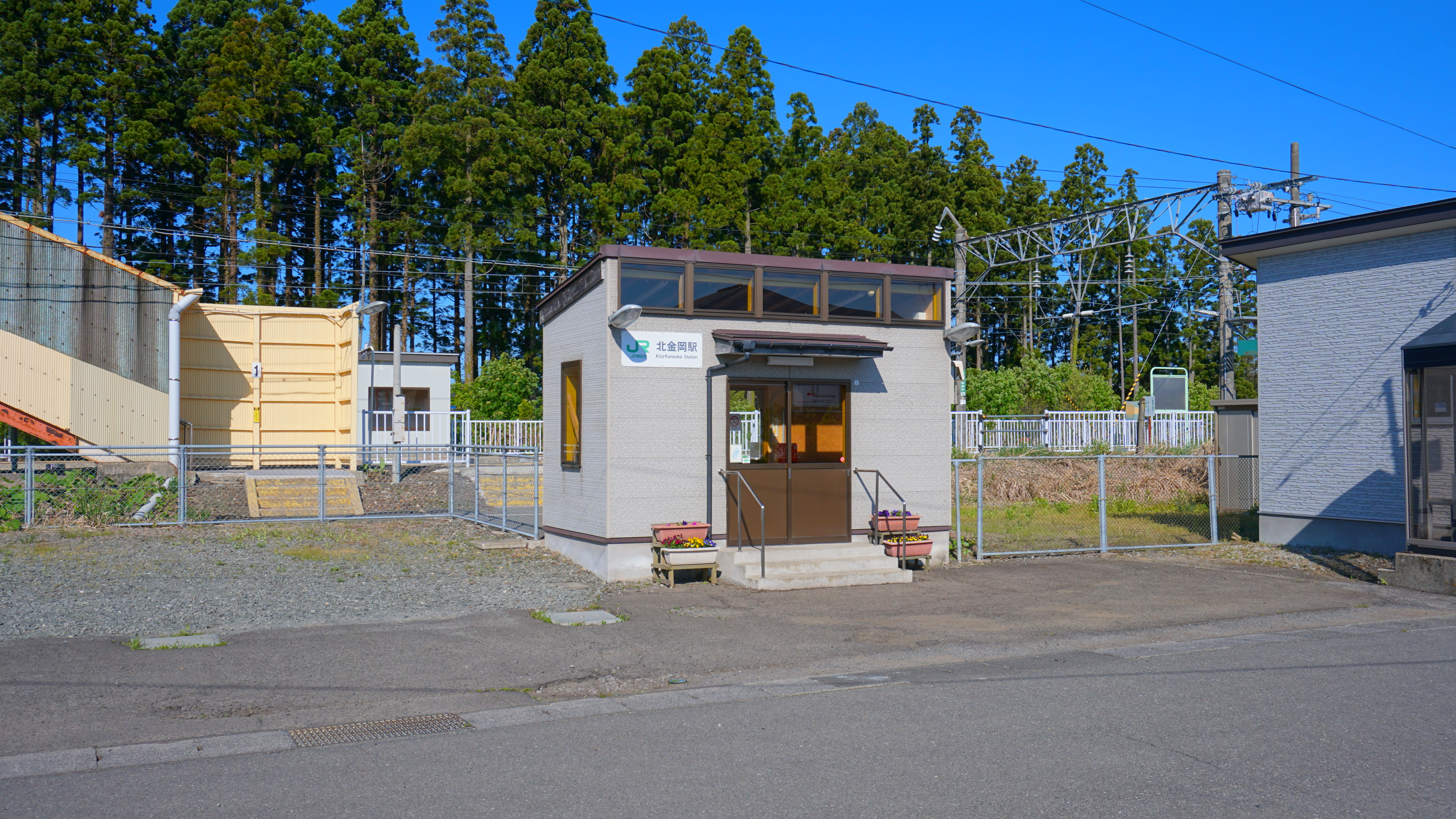
- Kita-Kanaoka Station (May 12, 2019)

General information
- Location: Shinden Shitobashi, Mitane-cho, Yamamoto-gun, Akita-ken 018-2301; Japan
- Coordinates: 40°8′30.8″N 140°3′48.5″E
- Operator: JR East
- Line: ■ Ōu Main Line
- Distance: 349.4 kilometers from Fukushima
- Platforms: 2 side platforms

Other information
- Status: Unstaffed
- Website: Official website

History
- Opened: February 25, 1952

Passengers
- FY2008: 70

Services
Preceding station	JR East	Following station
Moritake towards Shinjō	Ōu Main Line Local	Higashi-Noshiro towards Aomori
Location
- Location within Akita Prefecture Location within Japan

Kita-Kanaoka Station (北金岡駅, Kita-Kanaoka-eki) is a railway station located in the town of Mitane, Akita Prefecture, Japan, operated by the East Japan Railway Company (JR East).

== Lines ==
Kita-Kanaoka Station is served by the Ōu Main Line, and is located 349.4 km from the terminus of the line at Fukushima Station.

== Station layout ==
The station consists of a two opposed side platforms serving two tracks, connected to the station building by a footbridge. The station is unattended.

=== Platforms ===
1	■ Ōu Main Line	for Akita and Ōmagari
2	■ Ōu Main Line	for Higashi-Noshiro and Hirosaki

== History ==
Kita-Kanaoka Station began as Kita-Kanoka Signal Stop (金岡信号場) on June 1, 1944, and was elevated to a full station on the Japan National Railway (JNR), serving the village of Kanaoka, Akita on February 25, 1952. The station was absorbed into the JR East network upon the privatization of the JNR on April 1, 1987. It has been unattended since May 2005. A new station building was completed in April 2006.

== Passenger statistics ==
In fiscal 2008, the last for which published information is available. the station was used by an average of 70 passengers daily (boarding passengers only).

== Surrounding area ==
The station is located in a rural area of Mitane, with only a few houses nearby.

== See also ==
- List of railway stations in Japan
