= Mitane, Akita =

Mitane 三種町
- Town
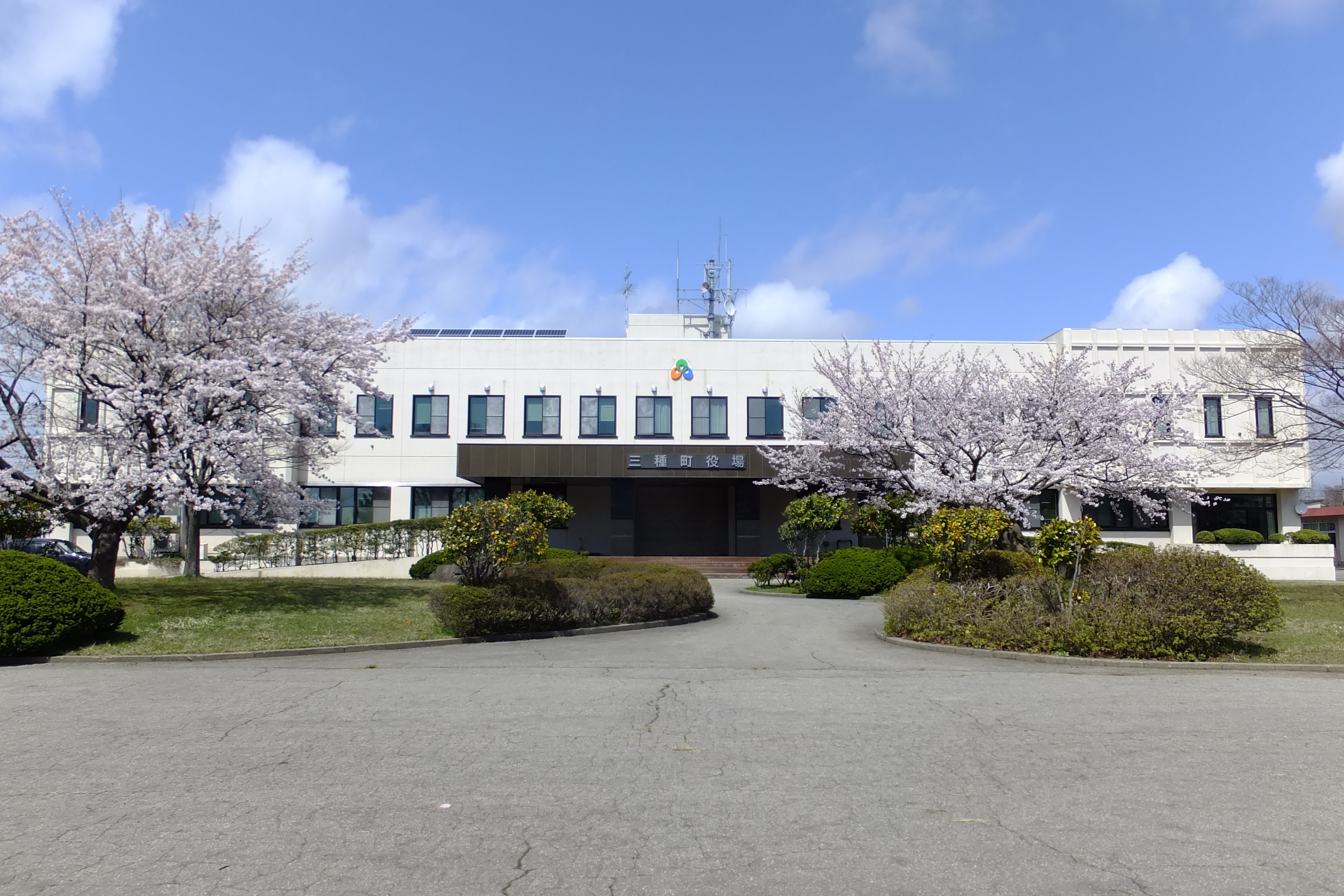
- Mitane Town Hall

- Flag Seal
- Interactive map of Mitane
- Coordinates: 40°6′6″N 140°0′18″E
- Country: Japan
- Region: Tōhoku
- Prefecture: Akita
- District: Yamamoto

Area
  - Total: 247.98 km^{2} (95.75 sq mi)

Population (February 28, 2023)
  - Total: 14,936
  - Density: 60.231/km^{2} (156.00/sq mi)
- Time zone: UTC+9 (Japan Standard Time)
- Phone number: 0185-85-2111
- Address: 8 Iwayako, Kamogawa-aze, Mitane-chō, Yamamoto-gun, Akita 018-2401
- Website: Official website
- Symbols
- Bird: Swan
- Flower: Cherry blossom
- Tree: Cryptomeria

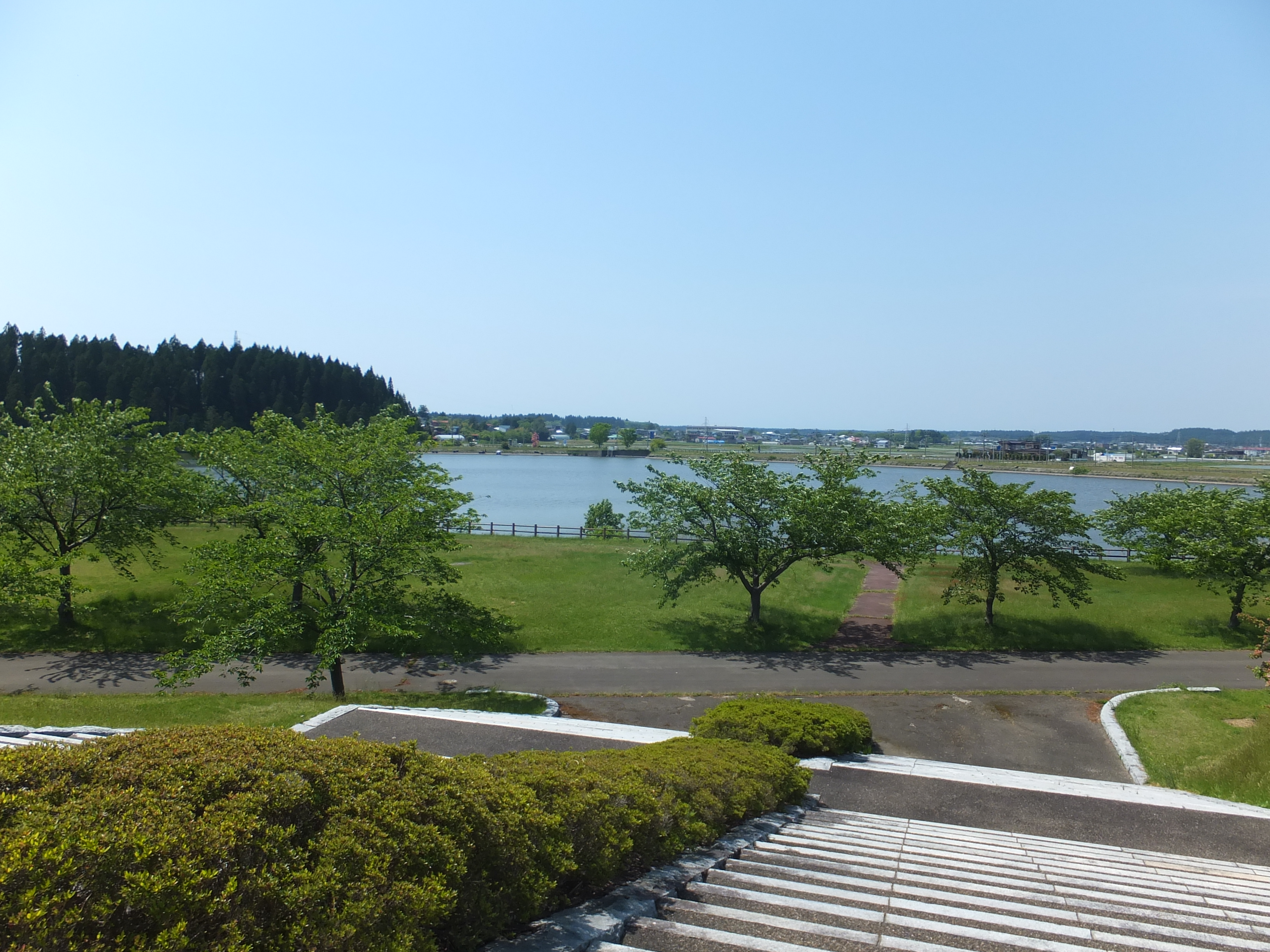
Sozaburonuma Park

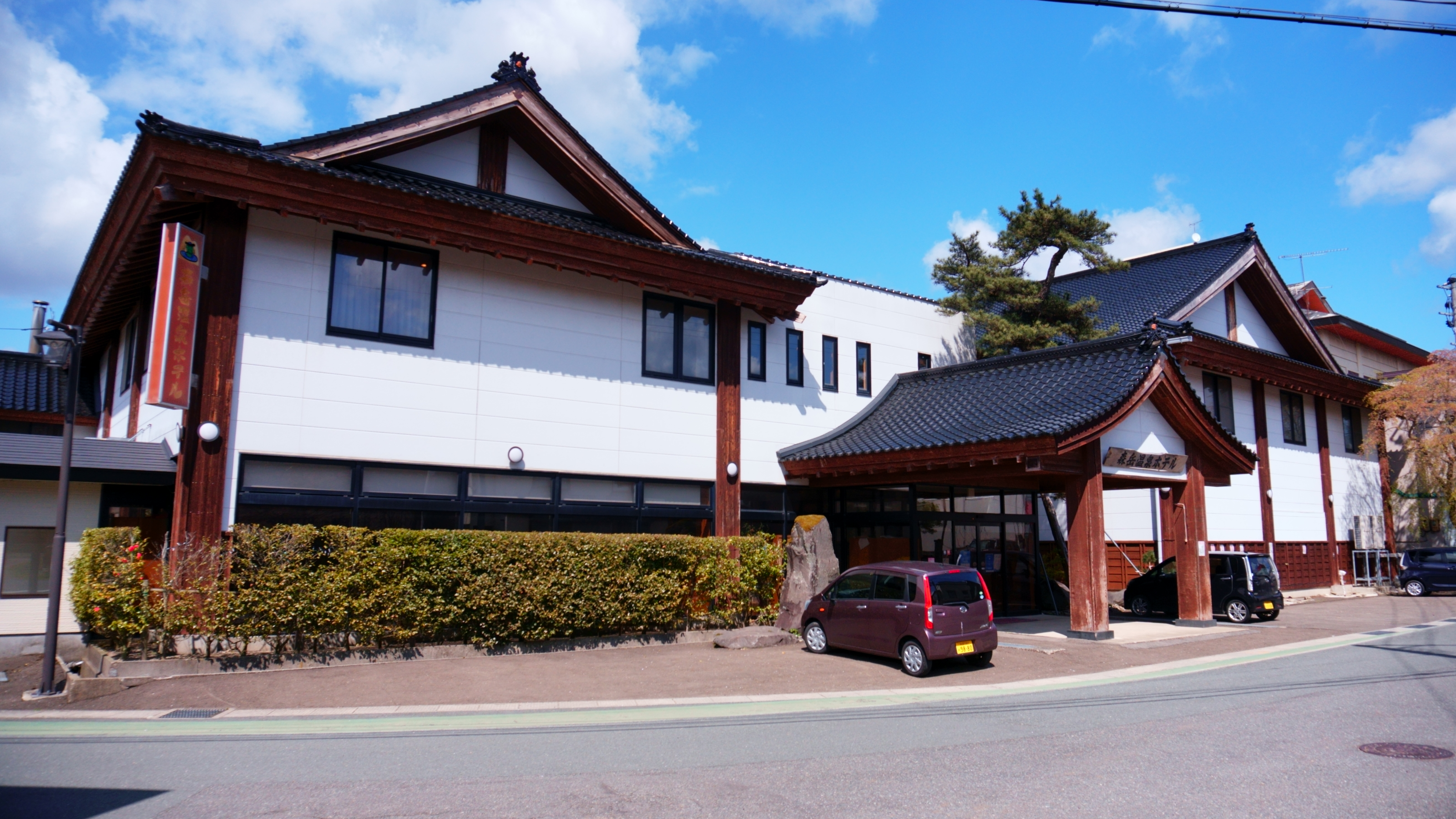
Moritake Onsen Park

Mitane (三種町, Mitane-chō) is a town located in Akita Prefecture, Japan. As of 28 February 2023, the town had an estimated population of 14,936, in 6729 households, and a population density of 60 persons per km^{2} The total area of the town is 247.98 square kilometres (95.75 sq mi).

== Geography ==
Mitane is located in northwestern Akita Prefecture, bordered by the Sea of Japan to the west.

=== Neighboring municipalities ===
Akita Prefecture

- Gojōme
- Hachirōgata
- Kamikoani
- Noshiro
- Oga
- Ōgata

=== Climate ===
Mitane has a humid continental climate (Köppen climate classification Cfa) with large seasonal temperature differences, with warm to hot (and often humid) summers and cold (sometimes severely cold) winters. Precipitation is significant throughout the year, but is heaviest from August to October. The average annual temperature in Mitane is 11.1 °C. The average annual rainfall is 1527 mm with September as the wettest month. The temperatures are highest on average in August, at around 25.1 °C, and lowest in January, at around -1.0 °C.

== Demographics ==
Per Japanese census data, the population of Mitane peaked at around the year 1950 and has been in steady decline since then.

Historical population

Year	Pop.	±%
1920	23,761	—
1930	23,743	−0.1%
1940	24,579	+3.5%
1950	32,389	+31.8%
1960	31,733	−2.0%
1970	28,168	−11.2%

Year	Pop.	±%
1980	26,089	−7.4%
1990	24,151	−7.4%
2000	22,112	−8.4%
2010	18,879	−14.6%
2020	15,254	−19.2%

== History ==
The area of present-day Mitane was part of ancient Dewa Province, dominated by the Satake clan during the Edo period, who ruled Kubota Domain under the Tokugawa shogunate. The area was organized into towns and villages within Yamamoto District, Akita with the establishment of the modern municipalities system in 1889. The town of Mitane was created on March 20, 2006, by merging the towns of Hachiryū, Koto'oka, and Yamamoto. The town name comes from the Mitane River that flows through the three original towns. After the merger, the town hall was set up in the former Hachiryū town hall, but the center of transportation and economy is the Shikado district of the former Koto'oka town.

== Government ==
Mitane has a mayor-council form of government with a directly elected mayor and a unicameral town council of 15 members. Mitane, together with the city of Noshiro and the other municipalities of Yamamoto District contributes four members to the Akita Prefectural Assembly. In terms of national politics, the town is part of Akita 2nd district of the lower house of the Diet of Japan.

== Economy ==
The economy of Mitane is based on agriculture. The town produces over 90% of the junsai sold commercially in Japan. The center of transportation and economy is the Shikato district in former Kotooka town.

== Education ==
Mitane has five public elementary schools and three public middle schools operated by the town government. The town does not have a high school.

== Transportation ==
=== Railway ===
East Japan Railway Company - Ōu Main Line

- Koikawa - Kado - Moritake - Kita-Kanaoka

=== Highway ===
- Akita Expressway
- National Route 7
- National Route 101

== Noted people from Mitane ==
- Takashi Miura, professional boxer
