= Sawame Station =

Railway station in Happō, Akita Prefecture, Japan

Sawame Station 沢目駅
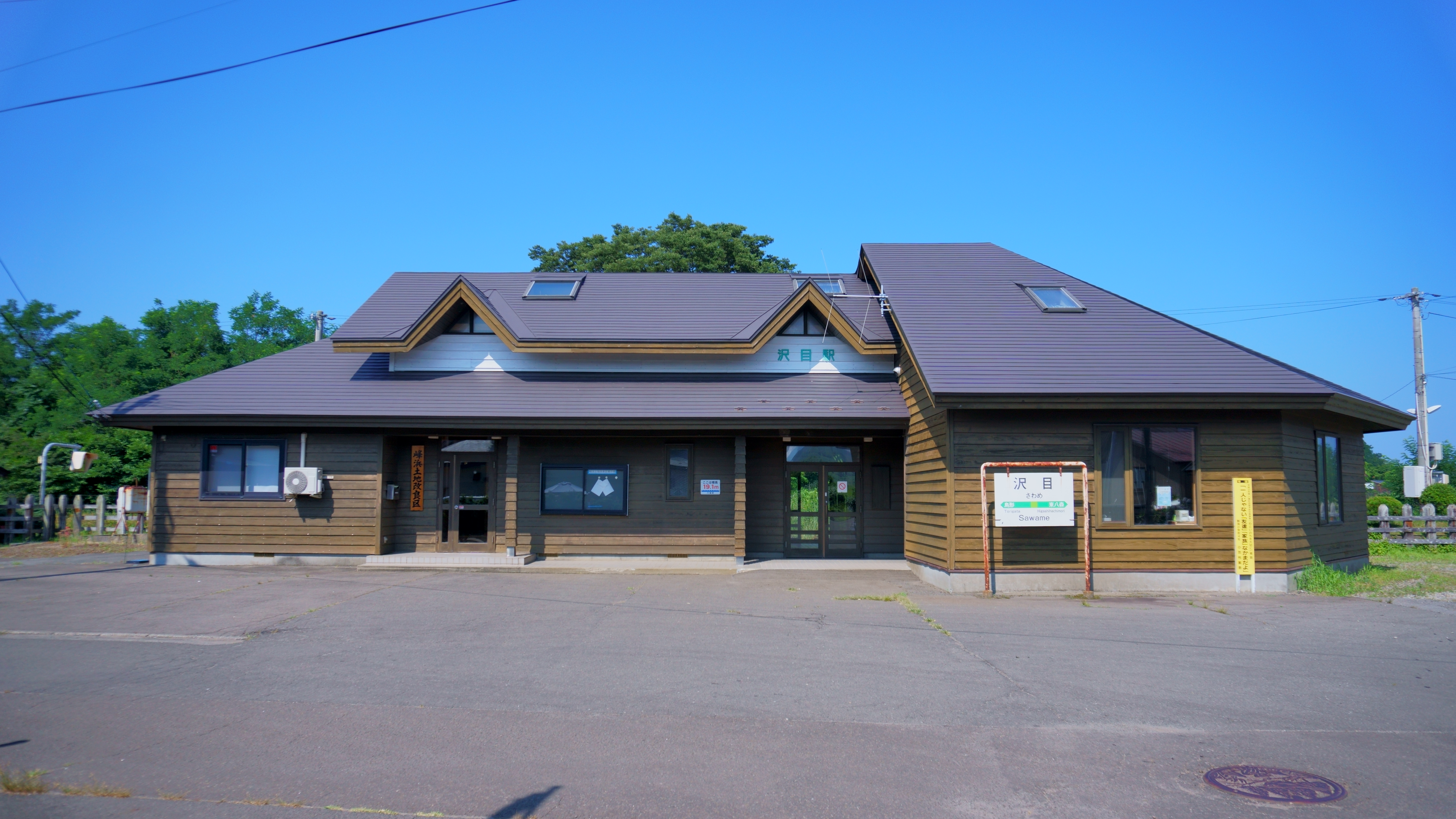
- Sawame Station, July 2021

General information
- Location: Minehama-aze Teranoato 1-22, Happō-cho, Yamamoto-gun, Akita-ken 018-2501; Japan
- Coordinates: 40°17′45.7″N 140°2′15.9″E
- Elevation: 19.1 m (63 ft)
- Operator: JR East
- Line: ■ Gonō Line
- Distance: 14.1 km from Higashi-Noshiro
- Platforms: 1 side platform
- Tracks: 1

Other information
- Website: Official website

History
- Opened: April 26, 1926

Services
Preceding station	JR East	Following station
Torigata towards Higashi-Noshiro	Gonō Line Local	Higashi-Hachimori towards Hirosaki
Location
- Location within Akita Prefecture Location within Japan

Sawame Station (沢目駅, Sawame-eki) is a railway station located in the town of Happō, Akita Prefecture, Japan, operated by East Japan Railway Company (JR East).

== Lines ==
Sawame Station is served by the 147.2 km (91.5 mi) Gonō Line, and is located 14.1 kilometers from the southern terminus of the line at Higashi-Noshiro Station.

== Station layout ==
The station has one side platform serving a single bidirectional track. The station is unattended.

== History ==
Sawame Station was opened on April 26, 1926 as a station on the Japanese Government Railways (JGR) serving the village of Sawame, Akita. The JGR became the JNR (Japan National Railways) after World War II. With the privatization of the JNR on April 1, 1987, the station has been managed by JR East.

== Surrounding area ==
- National Route 101
- Minehama Post Office

== See also ==
- List of railway stations in Japan
