= Yamamoto, Akita =

Dissolved municipality in Akita Prefecture, Japan

Yamamoto (山本町, Yamamoto-machi) was a town located in Yamamoto District, Akita Prefecture, Japan.

As of 2003, the town had an estimated population of 8,042 and a density of 82.04 persons per km^{2}. The total area is 98.02 km^{2}.

On March 20, 2006, Yamamoto, along with the towns of Koto'oka and Hachiryū (all from Yamamoto District), was merged to create the town of Mitane.
