= Minehama, Akita =

Minehama 峰浜村
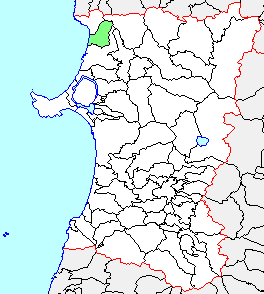
- Interactive map of Minehama
- Country: Japan
- Prefecture: Akita
- District: Yamamoto

Minehama (峰浜村, Minehama-mura) was a village located in Yamamoto District, Akita Prefecture, Japan.

As of 2003, the village had an estimated population of 4,687 and a density of 38.55 persons per km^{2}. The total area was 121.57 km^{2}.

On March 27, 2006, the Minehama, along with the town of Hachimori (also from Yamamoto District), was merged to create the town of Happō.
