= Moritake Station =

Railway station in Mitane, Akita Prefecture, Japan

Moritake Station 森岳駅
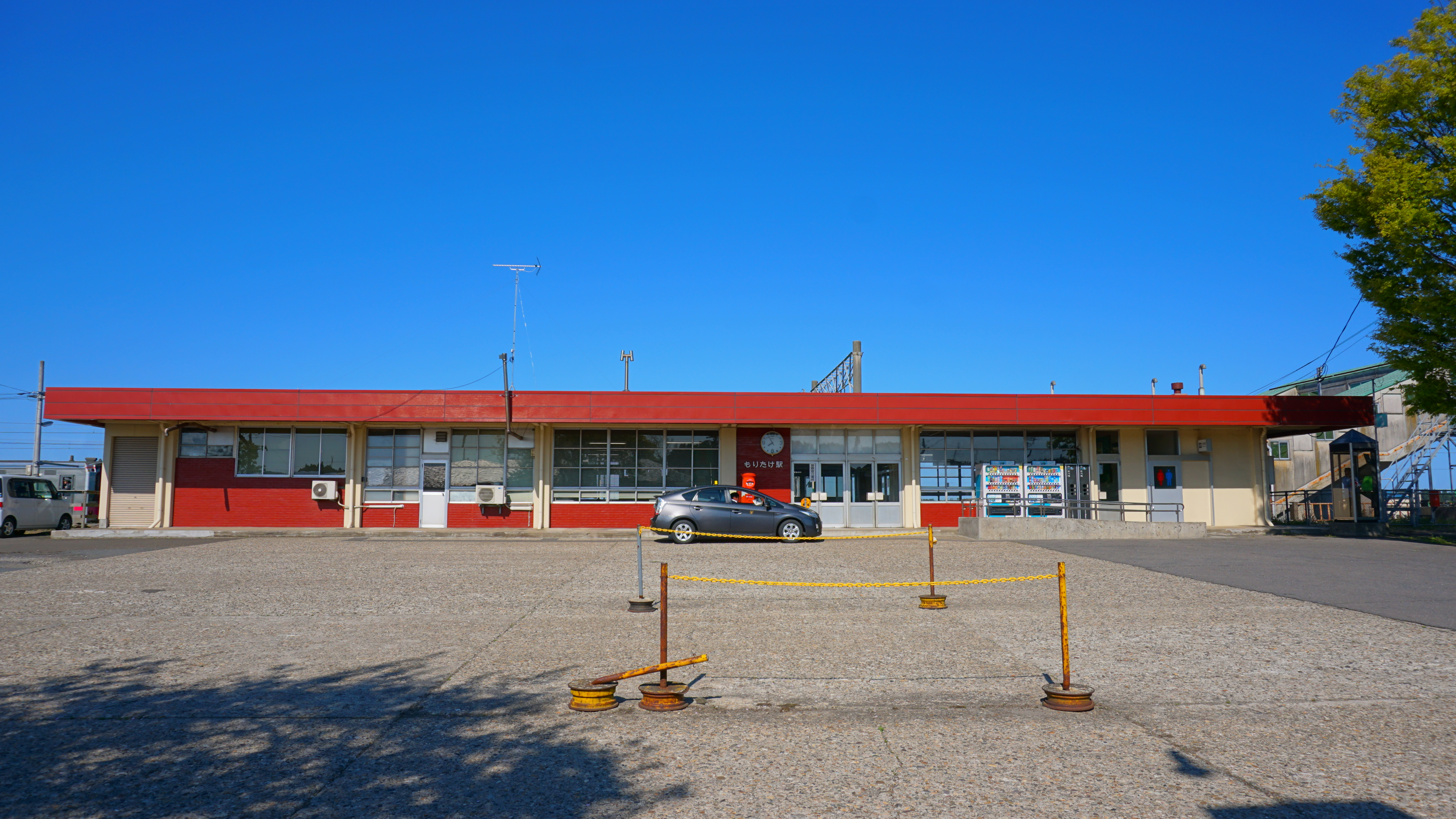
- Moritake Station in May 2019

General information
- Location: Moritake, Mitane-cho, Yamamoto-gun, Akita-ken 018-2303; Japan
- Coordinates: 40°6′11.48″N 140°4′15.19″E
- Operator: JR East
- Line: ■ Ōu Main Line
- Distance: 345.1 km from Fukushima
- Platforms: 2 side platforms
- Tracks: 2

Other information
- Status: Staffed
- Website: Official website

History
- Opened: 1 August 1902

Passengers
- FY2018: 181 daily

Services
Preceding station	JR East	Following station
Hachirōgata towards Akita	Tsugaru	Higashi-Noshiro towards Aomori
Hachirōgata towards Akita	Ōu Main Line Rapid	Higashi-Noshiro towards Aomori
Kado towards Shinjō	Ōu Main Line Local	Kita-Kanaoka towards Aomori
Location
- Location within Akita Prefecture Location within Japan

Moritake Station (森岳駅, Moritake-eki) is a railway station in the town of Mitane, Yamamoto District, Akita Prefecture, Japan, operated by East Japan Railway Company (JR East).

== Lines ==
Moritake Station is served by the Ōu Main Line, and is located 345.1 km from the terminus of the line at Fukushima Station.

== Station layout ==
Moritake Station consists of two opposed side platforms connected by a footbridge. The station is attended.

=== Platforms ===
1	■ Ōu Main Line	for Akita and Ōmagari
2	■ Ōu Main Line	for Higashi-Noshiro and Hirosaki

== History ==
Moritake Station opened on August 1, 1902 as a station on the Japanese Government Railways (JGR), serving the village of Moritake, Akita. The JGR became the Japanese National Railways (JNR) after World War II. The station was absorbed into the JR East network upon the privatization of the JNR on April 1, 1987.

== Passenger statistics ==
In fiscal 2018, the station was used by an average of 181 passengers daily (boarding passengers only). The passenger figures for previous years are as shown below.

Fiscal year	Daily average
2010	259
2015	214

== Surrounding area ==
- Moritake Post Office
- Moritake Onsen

== See also ==
- List of railway stations in Japan
