= Dome Narita =

Japanese snowboarder

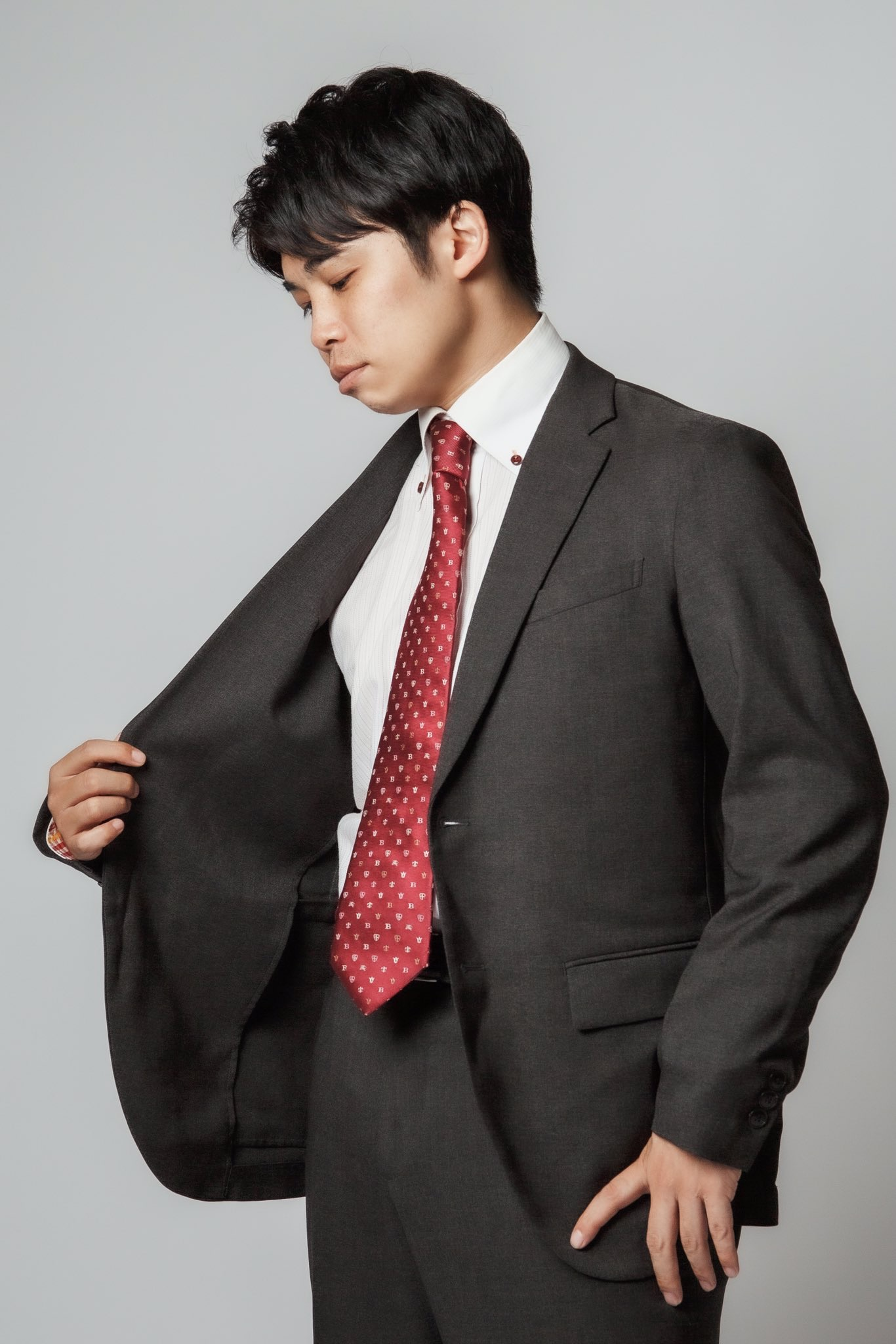

Personal information
- Native name: 成田 童夢
- Nationality: Japanese
- Citizenship: Japan
- Born: 22 September 1985 (age 39); Suminoe-ku, Osaka

Sport
- Event: Snowboarding

Dome Narita (成田 童夢, Narita Dōmu, born 22 September 1985 in Suminoe-ku, Osaka) is a Japanese former snowboarder and subculture tarento. He competed in the half-pipe snowboarding event at the 2006 Winter Olympics. His main activities and interests are anime, manga, video games, idol MC, and wotagei. He is also an onstage actor and has appeared in short films, which makes him a multi-tarento.

Narita's father is a snowboarding coach called Takashi Narita, his sister is also a former snowboarder, called Melo Imai, and his younger brother, Grim Narita, is a freestyle skier, snowboarder, and wakeboarder, among other sports, who plans to compete in the 2018 PyeongChang Winter Paralympics for snowboarding.

== Main results ==
Outcome	Year	Event	Ref.
Fifth	2002	World Cup (Makomanai, Sapporo)	
Won	2002	Japan Championship (Ajigasawa, Aomori)	
Won	2002	World Cup (Whistler, Canada)	
Eleventh	2003	FIS Snowboarding World Championships 2003	
Fourth	2004	World Cup (Bardonecchia, Italy)	
Third	2004	World Cup (Stoneham, Canada)	
Tenth	2005	World Championship (Whistler, Canada)	
Third	2005	World Cup (Bardonecchia, Italy)	
Won	2005	World Cup (Whistler, Canada)	
36th	2006	2006 Winter Olympics	
Second	2008	FIS (Kitashigatakaifuji, Nagano)	

== Filmography ==
=== Internet ===
Year	Title	Website	Notes
2011	Dome Narita no D-Revolution	akiba.net	
2012	Wednesday@TV	A'! To odoroku Hōsōkyoku	
2013	Dome Narita no "A-i-wo-ta" Idol×Wotagei=Infinity	Kita Sandō Hōsōkyoku	
2015	Seiyū Japan!	Niconico Live	MC

=== Anime ===
Year	Title	Role
2012	One Piece Episode of Luffy: Hand Island no Bōken	Villager

=== TV drama ===
Year	Title	Network
2013	GTO Kanketsu-hen: Saraba Onizuka! Sotsugyō Special	KTV

=== Variety ===
Year	Title	Network	Ref.
2008	Game Record GP	Mondo TV	
2016	Shikujiri Sensei	TV Asahi	

=== Stage ===
Year	Title
2013	Girls Rocketeer

=== Short films ===
Year	Title	Notes
2013	Tabidachi	Lead role

== See also ==
- Japan at the 2006 Winter Olympics
- Wotagei
