= Kotooka, Akita =

Dissolved municipality in Yamamoto district, Akita prefecture, Japan

Kotooka (琴丘町, Kotooka-machi) was a town located in Yamamoto District, Akita Prefecture, Japan.

As of 2003, the town has an estimated population of 5,819 and a density of 52.24 persons per km^{2}. The total area is 111.38 km^{2}.

On March 20, 2006, Kotooka, along with the towns of Hachiryū and Yamamoto (all from Yamamoto District), was merged to create the town of Mitane.
