= Melo Imai =

Japanese snowboarder (born 1987)

Personal information
- Native name: 今井 メロ
- Born: 26 October 1987 (age 38) Suminoe-ku, Osaka, Japan
- Occupation: Snowboarder

Sport
- Country: Japan
- Event: Snowboarding

Melo Imai (今井 メロ, 今井 夢露, Imai Mero; born 26 October 1987 in Suminoe-ku, Osaka) is a Japanese TV personality and half-pipe snowboarder. Her maiden name is Narita (成田).

Imai's father is snowboarding coach Takashi Narita, and she has two brothers: former snowboarder Dome Narita and trampoliner Grim Narita.

She gave up snowboarding after the 2006 Winter Olympics and became a television presenter, then a nude model appearing in several gravure DVDs. In 2017 she had a short career as pornographic film actress and in 2018 announced a return to snowboarding. The same year she won the All Japan Snowboarding Championships.

== Early life ==
From the age of 7, Imai's father, snowboarding coach Takashi Narita (成田 隆史), trained her and her brother Dome in snowboarding. They trained up to 18 hours a day, and when they finished high school, he had them forgo post-secondary education to focus on snowboarding. Imai has said she envied others her age for being able to lead ordinary lives, and at one point attempted to take her life by slashing her wrists.

== Early snowboarding career ==
Imai specialized in the half-pipe. She participated in the 2006 Winter Olympics in Turin, Italy, but came in last after severely injuring herself. Upon her return to Japan, she suffered public humiliation, with commenters calling her "a waste of tax money" and "a national embarrassment". She later stated, "For many athletes, the Olympics are the peak of their career, but for me it was a nightmare." She suffered from depression, and gave up the sport.

== Career in the sex industry, nude modelling and AV career ==
After leaving the sport, Imai supported herself over the years by working in bars, and soon became a hostess and then an escort, working three days at a sex parlor. She moved on to appearing in television programs as a tarento and as a nude model in pornographic magazines. Between 2014 and 2016 she appeared in over a dozen nude gravure DVD's, a genre of softcore pornography, all of them being produced by the company Kingdom. In 2017 she made her hardcore pornographic video début in Snow Drop and Snow Out. Both movies were released by Muteki, an AV company specializing in making the adult film debuts of gravure idols and minor celebrities. Upon being asked why she didn't maintain a longer career in AV, Imai said that she was more interested in returning to snowboarding and "didn't wanted to overdo it in AV".

== Return to snowboarding ==
Imai returned to snowboarding in 2017, and won gold at the All Japan Snowboarding Championships in 2018.

== Personal life ==
Imai has a son and daughter, whom she has raised as a single mother. Imai has stated she is not embarrassed by her past in pornography, as she did it voluntarily out of the need for money, and considers herself to have been a good mother who did everything to support her children.

== Main results ==
Outcome	Year	Championship	Summary	Reference
Won	2001	All Japan Ski Championships Snowboarding		
Won	2002	World Junior Championship		
Won	2004	All-Japan Ski Championship Tournament Snowboard Competition		
Won	2005	2004–05 FIS Snowboard World Cup Korea Star Capital Association		
Third	2005	World Cup Lake Placid Tournament		
Overall win	2005	World Cup Event		
Won	2005	2004–05 Season World Cup Saas Fee Olympics		
Qualified	2006	Turin Olympics		
Won	2008	Takasago Cup		
Won	2018	All Japan Snowboarding Championships	She won with 90.75, bettering second place's 76.75 of Momoa Mori	

== Filmography ==
=== TV drama ===
Year	Title	Role	Network	Notes
2015	Garo: Gold Storm Sho	Begul's tongue form	TV Tokyo	Episode 13

== Bibliography ==
Year	Title
2012	Naite, Yande, demo Waratte

=== Photo albums ===
Year	Title
2013	Mellow Style
2015	Melodious

=== DVD ===
Year	Title
2008	mellow lee;
2014	mellow Style
2014	I've been mellow
2014	mellow juice
2014	mellow time

== See also ==
- Japan at the 2006 Winter Olympics
