= Happō, Akita =

Happō 八峰町
- Town
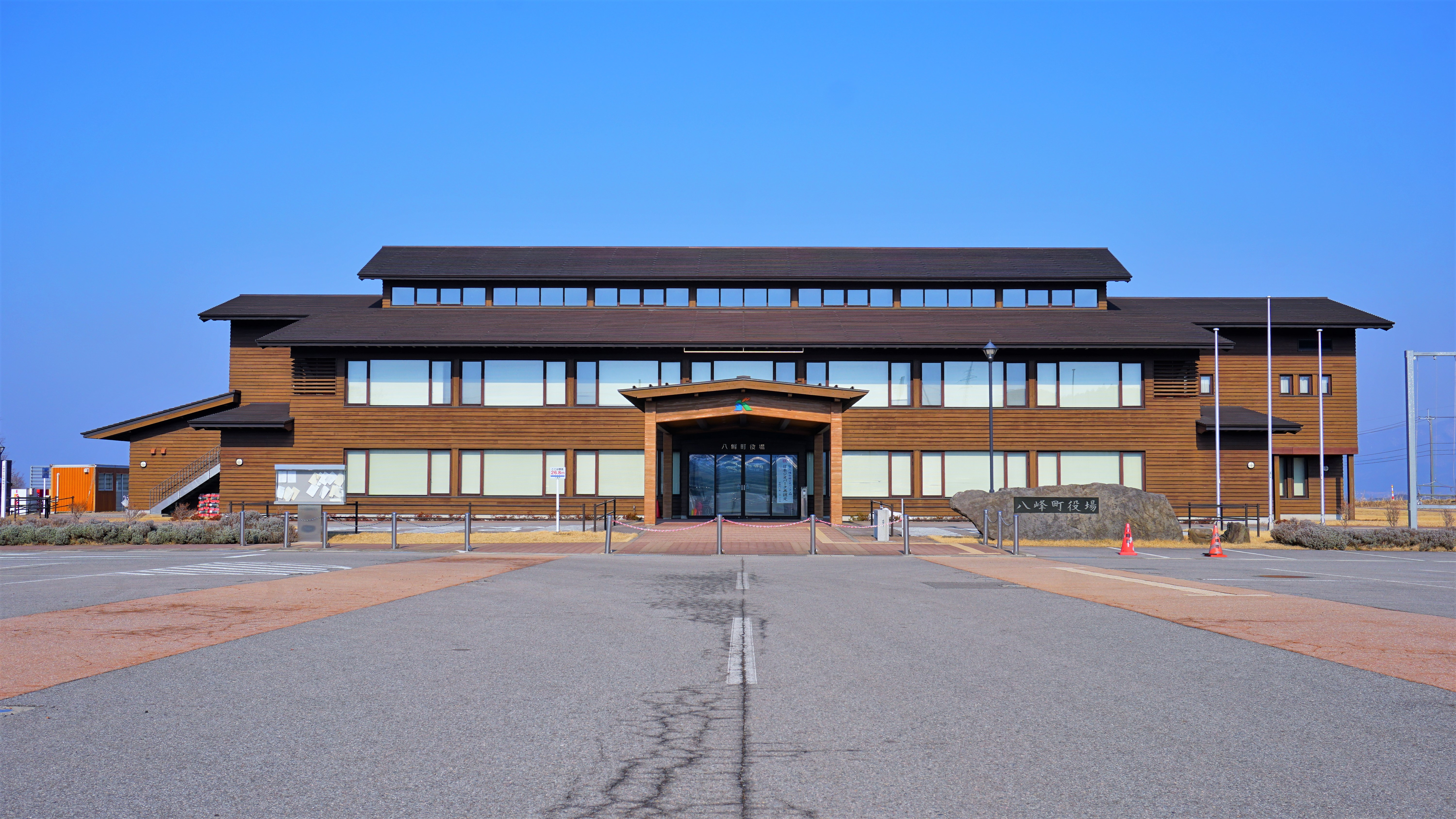
- Happō Town Hall

- Flag Seal
- Interactive map of Happō
- Coordinates: 40°17′48.6″N 140°2′3.4″E
- Country: Japan
- Region: Tōhoku
- Prefecture: Akita
- District: Yamamoto

Area
  - Total: 234.14 km^{2} (90.40 sq mi)

Population (January 1, 2023)
  - Total: 6,466
  - Density: 27.62/km^{2} (71.52/sq mi)
- Time zone: UTC+9 (Japan Standard Time)
- Phone number: 0185-77-2111
- Address: 118 Menagata, Minehama-Menagata, Happō-chō, Yamamoto-gun, Akita 018-2502
- Climate: Cfa
- Website: Official website
- Symbols
- Bird: Common gull
- Fish: Hatahata
- Flower: Katakuri
- Tree: Fagus crenata

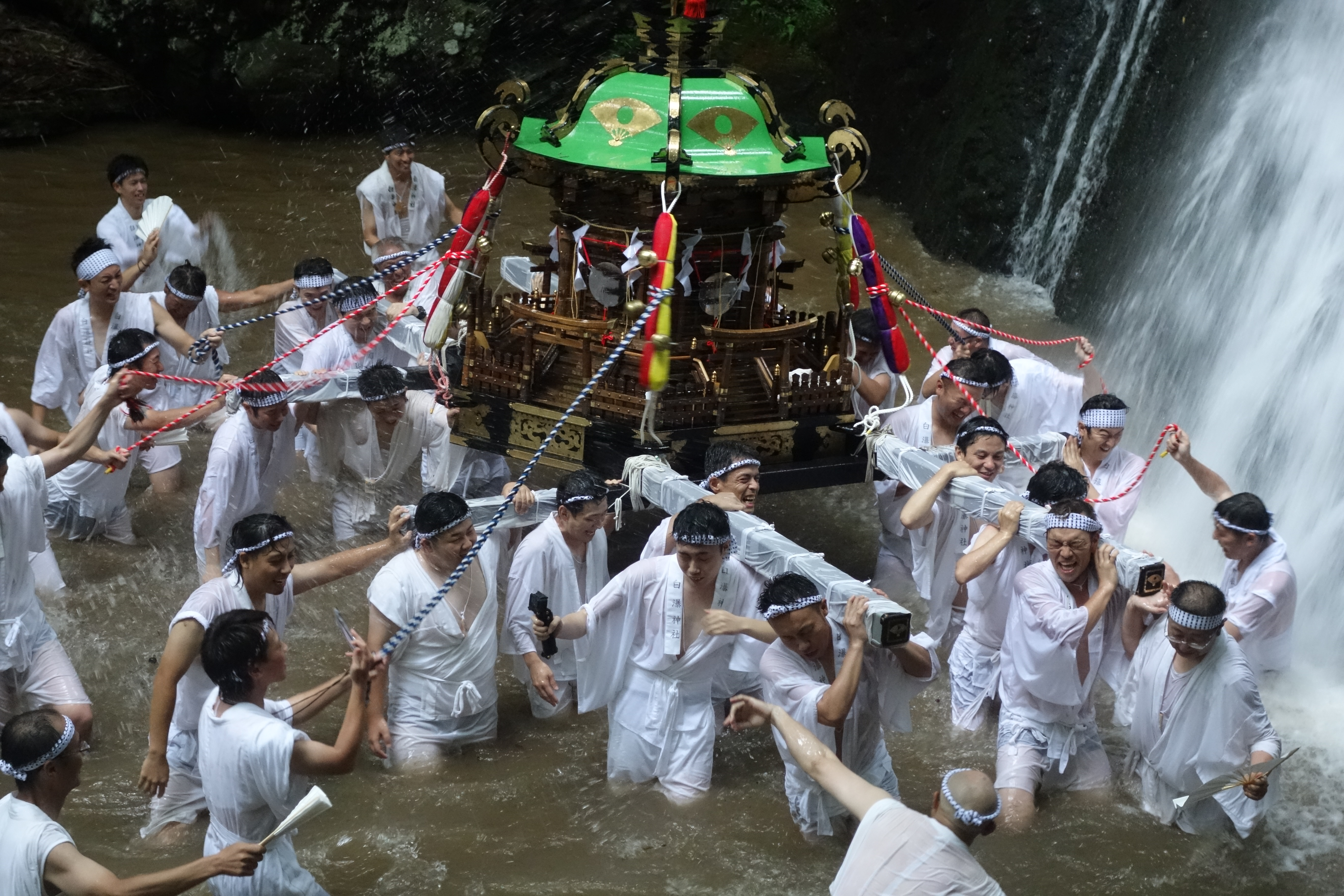
Shirataki Shrine festival

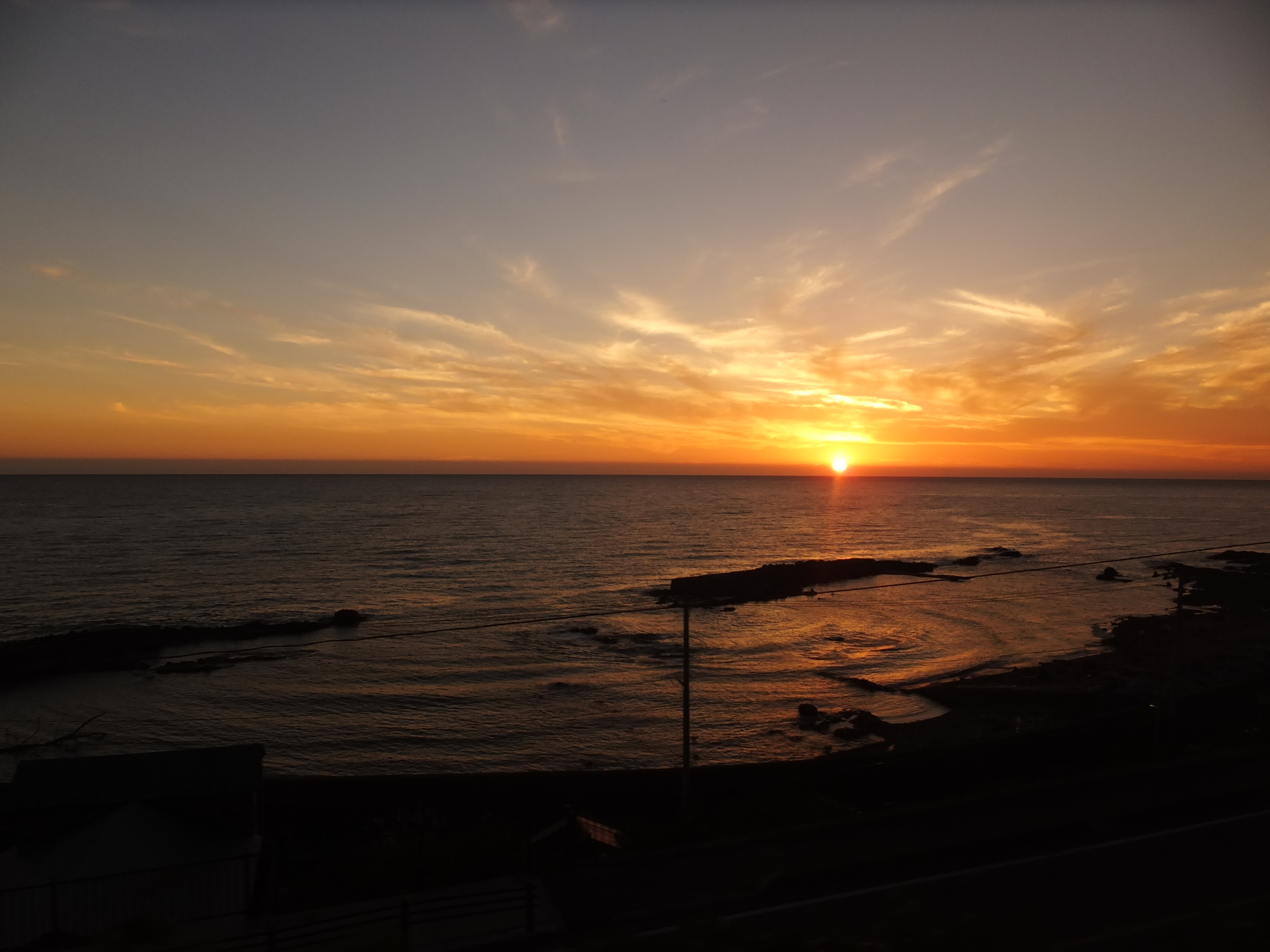
Sunset from Hachimori Beach

Happō (八峰町, Happō-chō) is a town located in Akita, Japan. As of 31 January 2023, the town had an estimated population of 6,466 in 2981 households, and a population density of 28 persons per km^{2}. The total area of the town is 234.14 square kilometres (90.40 sq mi).

== Geography ==
Happō is located in the mountainous far northwestern corner of Akita Prefecture, bordered by the World Heritage Site Shirakami Mountains to the south, and by Aomori Prefecture to the north and the Sea of Japan to the west. Approximately 80% of the area is classified as mountainous or forest, and about 10% of the total area is agricultural land, most of which is in the Minehama area. Due to its location, the temperature in Happō can get remarkably cold at night, with snowfall tending to be somewhat greater than that in neighboring municipalities

=== Neighboring municipalities ===
Akita Prefecture

- Fujisato
- Noshiro

Aomori Prefecture

- Ajigasawa
- Fukaura

=== Climate ===
Happō has a humid subtropical climate (Köppen climate classification Cfa) with large seasonal temperature differences, with warm to hot (and often humid) summers and cold (sometimes severely cold) winters. Precipitation is significant throughout the year, but is heaviest from August to October. The average annual temperature in Happō is 11.6 °C (52.9 °F). The average annual rainfall is 1,501.6 mm (59.12 in) with July as the wettest month. The temperatures are highest on average in August, at around 23.9 °C (75.0 °F), and lowest in January, at around 0.7 °C (33.3 °F).

Climate data for Hachimori, Happō (1991−2020 normals, extremes 1976−present)
Month	Jan	Feb	Mar	Apr	May	Jun	Jul	Aug	Sep	Oct	Nov	Dec	Year
Record high °C (°F)	14.1 (57.4)	18.2 (64.8)	19.1 (66.4)	25.9 (78.6)	28.0 (82.4)	31.4 (88.5)	35.2 (95.4)	37.4 (99.3)	36.0 (96.8)	29.0 (84.2)	21.8 (71.2)	18.7 (65.7)	37.4 (99.3)
Mean daily maximum °C (°F)	3.1 (37.6)	3.6 (38.5)	7.1 (44.8)	12.9 (55.2)	18.0 (64.4)	22.0 (71.6)	25.6 (78.1)	27.6 (81.7)	24.4 (75.9)	18.4 (65.1)	12.0 (53.6)	6.0 (42.8)	15.1 (59.1)
Daily mean °C (°F)	0.7 (33.3)	0.9 (33.6)	3.8 (38.8)	9.0 (48.2)	14.1 (57.4)	18.3 (64.9)	22.3 (72.1)	23.9 (75.0)	20.4 (68.7)	14.5 (58.1)	8.7 (47.7)	3.2 (37.8)	11.6 (53.0)
Mean daily minimum °C (°F)	−1.9 (28.6)	−1.9 (28.6)	0.5 (32.9)	4.9 (40.8)	10.2 (50.4)	14.7 (58.5)	19.3 (66.7)	20.4 (68.7)	16.4 (61.5)	10.6 (51.1)	5.2 (41.4)	0.3 (32.5)	8.2 (46.8)
Record low °C (°F)	−8.3 (17.1)	−10.4 (13.3)	−7.7 (18.1)	−3.1 (26.4)	1.1 (34.0)	5.6 (42.1)	11.5 (52.7)	12.9 (55.2)	7.7 (45.9)	2.6 (36.7)	−3.5 (25.7)	−8.8 (16.2)	−10.4 (13.3)
Average precipitation mm (inches)	91.2 (3.59)	68.9 (2.71)	83.2 (3.28)	95.8 (3.77)	119.8 (4.72)	106.0 (4.17)	172.2 (6.78)	170.8 (6.72)	155.2 (6.11)	158.3 (6.23)	152.7 (6.01)	127.5 (5.02)	1,501.6 (59.12)
Average precipitation days (≥ 1.0 mm)	17.2	13.9	13.4	11.4	10.7	10.5	12.1	10.4	11.8	14.1	16.7	18.9	161.1
Mean monthly sunshine hours	40.3	62.0	116.5	164.3	178.0	175.2	145.4	174.5	158.8	135.4	81.3	44.6	1,472.1
Source: Japan Meteorological Agency

== Demographics ==
Per Japanese census data, the population of Happō has been in steady decline for the past 60 years.

Historical population
Year	Pop.	±% p.a.
1960	15,421	—
1970	13,083	−1.63%
1980	11,638	−1.16%
1990	10,677	−0.86%
2000	9,698	−0.96%
2010	8,225	−1.63%
2020	6,577	−2.21%

== History ==
The area of present-day Happō was part of ancient Dewa Province, dominated by the Satake clan during the Edo period, who ruled Kubota Domain under the Tokugawa shogunate. The village of Hachimori was established with the creation of the modern municipalities system on April 1, 1889. It was raised to town status on October 1, 1954. The town of Happō was created on March 27, 2006, by merger of Hachimori with the village of Minehama, both from Yamamoto District.

== Government ==
Happō has a mayor-council form of government with a directly elected mayor and a unicameral town council of 12 members. Happō, together with the city of Noshiro and the other municipalities of Yamamoto District contributes four members to the Akita Prefectural Assembly. In terms of national politics, the town is part of Akita 2nd district of the lower house of the Diet of Japan.

== Economy ==
The economy of Happō is based on agriculture and commercial fishing.

== Education ==
Happō has two public elementary schools and one middle school operated by the town government. The town does not have a high school.

== Transportation ==
=== Railway ===
East Japan Railway Company - Gonō Line

- Sawame – Higashi-Hachimori – Hachimori – Takinoma – Akita-Shirakami – Iwadate

=== Highway ===
- National Route 101

== Sister cities ==
- (China) Guangling District, Jiangsu
