= Yamamoto District, Akita =

District in Akita prefecture, Japan

Coordinates: 40.284°N 140.26°E

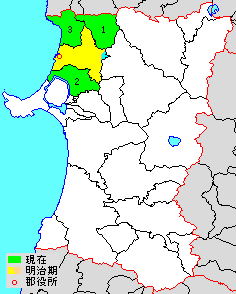
Map showing original extent of Yamamoto District in Akita Prefecture green - current yellow - former extent in early Meiji period: 1. Fujisato; 2. Happō; 3. Mitane

Yamamoto District (山本郡, Yamamoto-gun) is a rural district located in Akita Prefecture, Japan.

As of 2020, the district has a population of 24,727 and an area of 764.27 km^{2}. All of the city of Noshiro was formerly part of Yamamoto District.

== Towns and villages ==
- Fujisato
- Happō
- Mitane

== History ==
The area of Yamamoto District (Hiyama District, Akita) was formerly part of Dewa Province, and came under the new province of Ugo Province on January 19, 1869, following the Meiji restoration. At the time, the area consisted of 2 towns and 72 villages formerly under the control of Kubota Domain, based at Akita. The area became part of Akita Prefecture in 1871, and was organized as Yamamoto District in 1878.

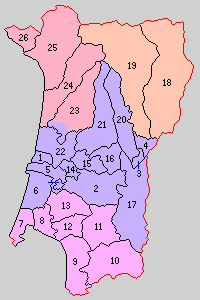
Historic Map of Yamamoto District: Purple - Noshiro-shi: 1. Noshiroko; 2. Hiyama; 3. Futatsui; 4. Niageba; 5. Sakaki; 6. Asanai; 14. Ogifuchi; 15. Tsurugata; 16. Toyone; 17. Hibiki; 20. Taneume; 21. Tokiwa; 22. Shinonome; 23. Hanawakawa (southwest portion); Salmon - Happō-machi: 23. Hanawakawa (northeast portion, most); 24. Sawame; 25. Hachimori; 26. Iwadate; Pink - Mitane-machi: 7. Hamaguchi; 8. Kamogawa; 9. Kado; 10. Kamiiwakawa; 11. Shimoiwakawa; 12. Morioka; 13. Kaneoka; Orange - Fujisato-machi: 18. Fujikoto; 19. Kasuge

With the establishment of the municipality system on April 1, 1889, two towns (Noshiroko and Hiyama) and 24 villages were established. Futatsui was raised to town status on June 4, 1902, followed by Kado on January 1, 1932. Noshiroko became the city of Noshiro on October 1, 1940.

Hachimori was raised to town status on October 1, 1954. Hiyama was absorbed into Noshiro on April 1, 1955, and the town of Kado was renamed Kotooka. The village of Yamamoto gained town status on September 1, 1962, followed by Fujisato on November 1, 1963, and Hachiryū on September 1, 1965.

In 2006, as part of the Heisei period Municipal mergers and dissolutions in Japan, all of the district except for the town of Fujisato was scheduled to merge with Noshiro to form the new city of Shirakami. However, the residents of Noshiro were opposed to this name and left the merger conference. The remaining six towns and villages tried to merge, but this plan failed as the merger would turn Hachimori and Minehama into an exclave of the new city. Noshiro delegates attempted to return to the conference, but the other conference members rejected their participation and the meeting split into the three different merger conferences of "Noshiro-Futatsui," "Southern Three Towns," and "Northern Two Towns and Villages." As a result:

- On March 20, 2006 - The towns of Hachiryū, Koto'oka, and Yamamoto were merged to create the town of Mitane.
- On March 21, 2006 - The town of Futatsui was merged with the expanded city of Noshiro, although Futatsui wanted the new city's name to be Yoneshiro (米代市).
- On March 27, 2006 - The town of Hachimori, and the village of Minehama were merged to create the town of Happō.

== Economics ==
The area of Mitane is known for growing junsai.

As of 2020, the areas on the sea are being considered for an offshore wind project.
