= Ōgata, Akita =

Ōgata 大潟村
- Village
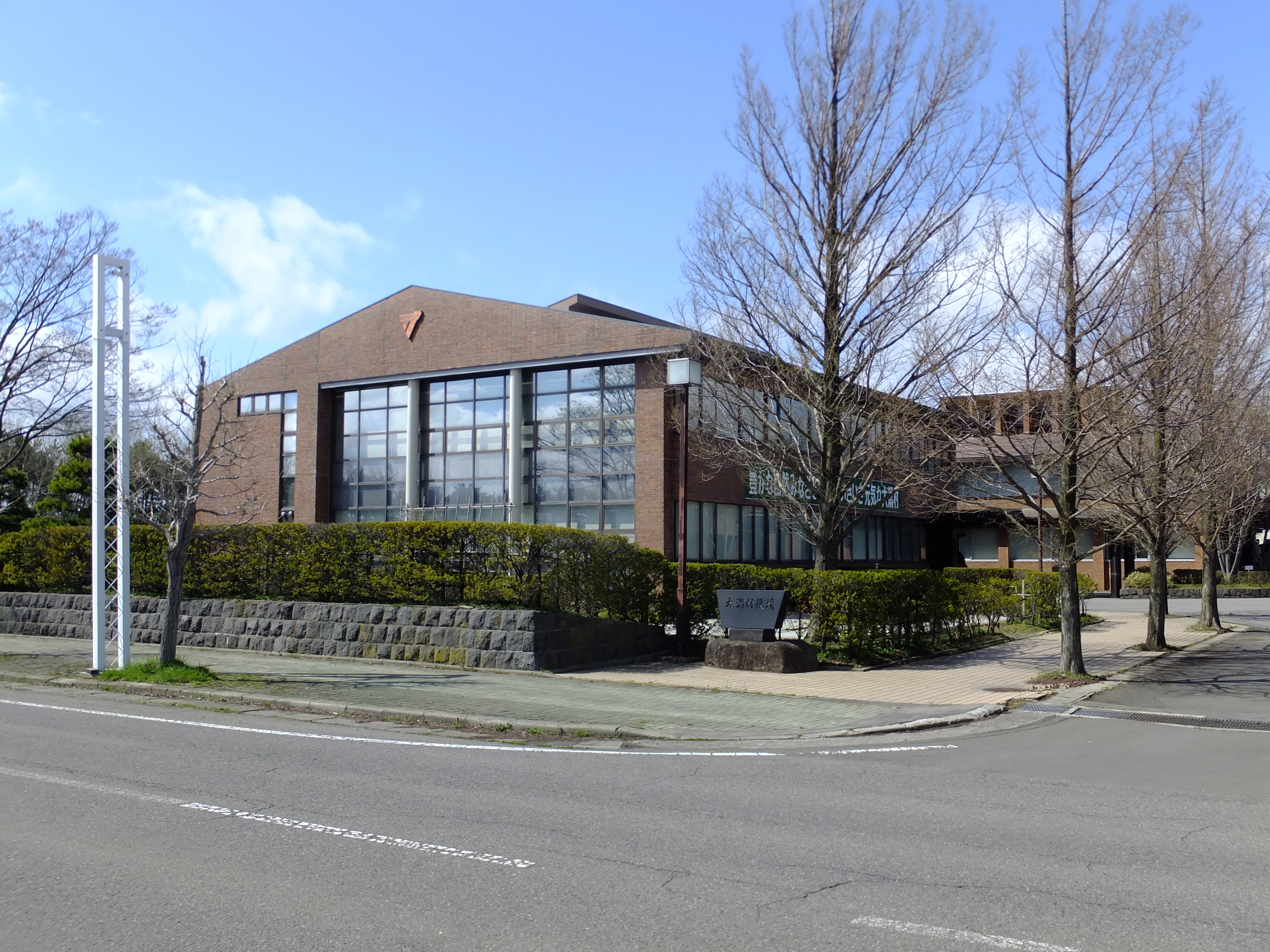
- Ōgata Village Office

- Flag Seal
- Location of Ōgata in Akita Prefecture

- Location within Japan
- Coordinates: 40°1′4.1″N 139°57′35.8″E
- Country: Japan
- Region: Tōhoku
- Prefecture: Akita
- District: Minamiakita

Government
  - Mayor: Hiroto Takahashi

Area
  - Total: 170.11 km^{2} (65.68 sq mi)

Population (March 1, 2023)
  - Total: 2,991
  - Density: 17.58/km^{2} (45.54/sq mi)
- Time zone: UTC+9 (Japan Standard Time)
- Phone number: 0185-45-2111
- Address: 1-1 Chūō, Ōgata-mura, Minamiakita-gun, Akita-ken 010-0494
- Climate: Cfa
- Website: Official website
- Symbols
- Bird: Swan
- Flower: Scarlet Sage
- Tree: Japanese Black Pine

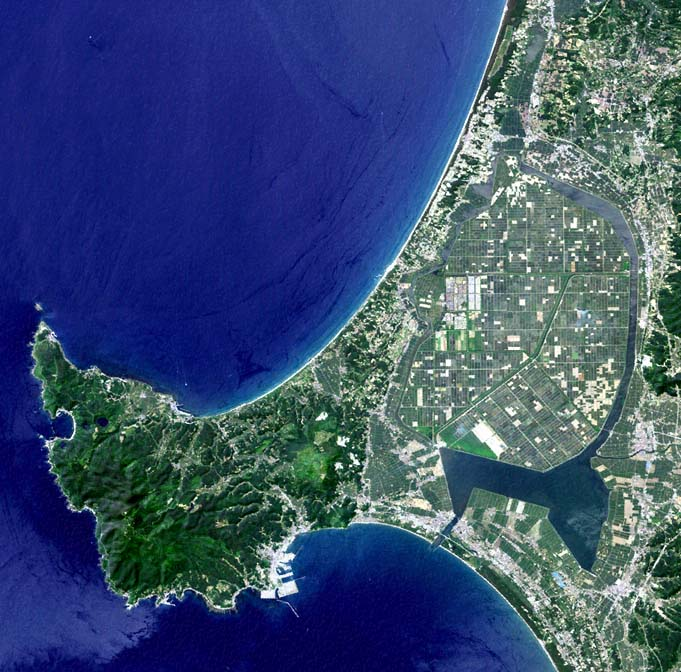
Oga Peninsula and Ōgata Village

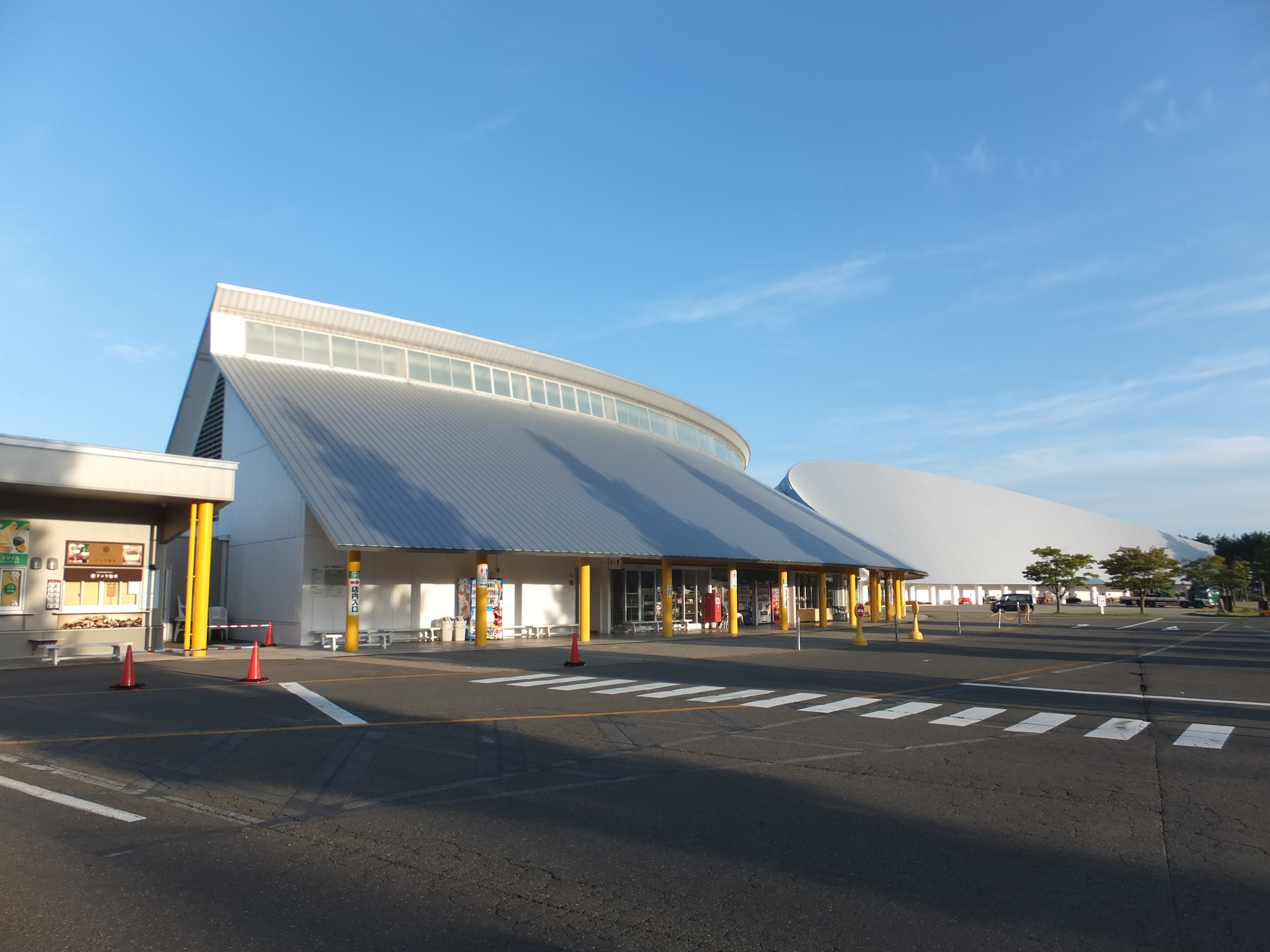
Roadside station and Polder Museum Ogata

Ōgata (大潟村, Ōgata-mura) is a village located in Minamiakita District, Akita Prefecture, Japan. As of 1 March 2023, the village had an estimated population of 2,991 in 1115 households, and a population density 19 persons per km^{2}. The total area of the village is 170.11 square kilometres (65.68 sq mi).

== Geography ==
Ōgata is located northwestern Akita Prefecture, and is a polder consisting entirely of land reclaimed from the former Hachirōgata Lagoon. The outer periphery of the village, which forms an almost elliptical shape, is formed by the remnant waters of Hachirōgata Lagoon, and this water area forms the boundary with the surrounding municipalities. Ogata and surrounding municipalities do not touch directly, but are connected only by seven bridges. To the south of the village is the Hachirōgata Regulating Reservoir (also known as Lake Hachiro, or sometimes still simply called "Hachirōgata" ). The eastern drainage canal forms the perimeter of the village and extends northwards, joining the western drainage canal due north. The western aqueduct extends from north to southwest and connects with the Hachirōgata Regulating Reservoir. The former Hachirōgata Lagoon remains in the form of a regulating pond in the south. Apart from this, irrigation canals and drainage canals have been developed inside the village. In Ogata, where most of the land is at or below, sea level, an artificial hill was constructed as a symbol of the village in the 1990s. "Ogata Fuji" has a relative height of 3.776 meters. Most of the village area of Ogata is farmland, with the urban center in the west central part of the village area.

=== Neighboring municipalities ===
Akita Prefecture

- Hachirōgata
- Ikawa
- Katagami
- Mitane
- Oga

=== Climate ===
Ōgata has a humid continental climate (Köppen climate classification Cfa) with large seasonal temperature differences, with warm to hot (and often humid) summers and cold (sometimes severely cold) winters. Precipitation is significant throughout the year, but is heaviest from August to October. The average annual temperature in Ōgata is 11.4 °C (52.5 °F). The average annual rainfall is 1,430.6 mm (56.32 in) with November as the wettest month. The temperatures are highest on average in August, at around 24.0 °C (75.2 °F), and lowest in January, at around 0.2 °C (32.4 °F).

Climate data for Ōgata (1991−2020 normals, extremes 1977−present)
| Month | Jan | Feb | Mar | Apr | May | Jun | Jul | Aug | Sep | Oct | Nov | Dec | Year |
|---|---|---|---|---|---|---|---|---|---|---|---|---|---|
| Record high °C (°F) | 12.1 (53.8) | 17.5 (63.5) | 18.6 (65.5) | 26.0 (78.8) | 31.2 (88.2) | 31.8 (89.2) | 35.6 (96.1) | 38.1 (100.6) | 35.9 (96.6) | 29.4 (84.9) | 24.4 (75.9) | 17.1 (62.8) | 38.1 (100.6) |
| Mean daily maximum °C (°F) | 3.0 (37.4) | 3.6 (38.5) | 7.4 (45.3) | 13.4 (56.1) | 18.8 (65.8) | 22.8 (73.0) | 26.4 (79.5) | 28.5 (83.3) | 24.8 (76.6) | 18.6 (65.5) | 12.1 (53.8) | 5.9 (42.6) | 15.4 (59.8) |
| Daily mean °C (°F) | 0.2 (32.4) | 0.5 (32.9) | 3.5 (38.3) | 8.7 (47.7) | 14.3 (57.7) | 18.7 (65.7) | 22.6 (72.7) | 24.0 (75.2) | 19.9 (67.8) | 13.7 (56.7) | 7.9 (46.2) | 2.6 (36.7) | 11.4 (52.5) |
| Mean daily minimum °C (°F) | −3.1 (26.4) | −3.1 (26.4) | −0.9 (30.4) | 3.3 (37.9) | 9.6 (49.3) | 14.6 (58.3) | 19.1 (66.4) | 19.9 (67.8) | 15.2 (59.4) | 8.5 (47.3) | 3.3 (37.9) | −0.8 (30.6) | 7.1 (44.8) |
| Record low °C (°F) | −17.3 (0.9) | −19.3 (−2.7) | −12.7 (9.1) | −6.5 (20.3) | −3.9 (25.0) | 6.2 (43.2) | 5.0 (41.0) | 9.8 (49.6) | 3.4 (38.1) | −1.4 (29.5) | −10.8 (12.6) | −14.4 (6.1) | −19.3 (−2.7) |
| Average precipitation mm (inches) | 101.3 (3.99) | 81.1 (3.19) | 82.3 (3.24) | 82.8 (3.26) | 91.3 (3.59) | 95.6 (3.76) | 153.5 (6.04) | 145.9 (5.74) | 154.1 (6.07) | 155.1 (6.11) | 164.6 (6.48) | 139.0 (5.47) | 1,430.6 (56.32) |
| Average precipitation days (≥ 1.0 mm) | 18.7 | 15.9 | 14.4 | 10.9 | 10.6 | 9.5 | 11.1 | 10.1 | 11.8 | 14.4 | 17.9 | 20.9 | 166.2 |
| Mean monthly sunshine hours | 33.3 | 56.3 | 128.2 | 179.5 | 190.7 | 178.9 | 156.1 | 190.6 | 169.7 | 145.5 | 85.2 | 41.6 | 1,554.3 |
Source: Japan Meteorological Agency

== Demographics ==
Per Japanese census data, the population of Ōgata has remained relatively steady over the past 40 years.

Historical population
| Year | Pop. | ±% |
|---|---|---|
| 1960 | 0 | — |
| 1970 | 1,640 | — |
| 1980 | 3,334 | +103.3% |
| 1990 | 3,286 | −1.4% |
| 2000 | 3,323 | +1.1% |
| 2010 | 3,218 | −3.2% |
| 2020 | 3,011 | −6.4% |

== History ==
Following the conclusion of the Pacific War, the government sought to create new farmland in order to secure a stable domestic supply of rice. The Hachirōgata lagoon was the second largest lake in Japan and an ideal candidate for extensive land reclamation due its shallow waters. Land reclamation work began at Hachirōgata in April 1957. Over the next twenty years, with the help of Dutch engineers, around seventeen thousand hectares of new farmland were created. Ōgata village was founded on this newly reclaimed land on October 1, 1964. Between 1967 and 1974 about 580 settlers took up residence in the new village of Ōgata, bringing their families with them.

== Government ==
Ōgata has a mayor-council form of government with a directly elected mayor and a unicameral village council of 12 members. Ōgata, together with the other municipalities of Minamiakita District contributes one member to the Akita Prefectural Assembly. In terms of national politics, the village is part of Akita 2nd district of the lower house of the Diet of Japan.

== Economy ==
The economy of Ōgata is based on agriculture, mostly on the cultivation of rice.

== Education ==
Ōgata has one public elementary school and one public middle school operated by the village government. The village does not have a high school. Akita Prefectural University Ogata Campus is located here.

== Transportation ==
Ōgata is not served by any railways or highways. The nearest train stations are Kado Station (northeast) and Hachirōgata Station (southeast) on the JR East Ōu Main Line, which runs east of the village area, and Funakoshi Station on the JR East Oga Line, which runs on the southwest side.

== Local attractions ==
- Cherry and Rapeseed Blossom Road
- Ground Golf Course
- Hachirōgata Reclamation Monument
- Hotel Sun Rural Ogata
- KATA Farmer's Market
- Latitude and Longitude Intersection Monument
- The NHK Ōgata Transmitter (used for transmissions on 774 kHz with a power of 500 kW)
- Ogata Fuji
- Ogata Moor Onsen
- Polder Museum of Ogata-mura
- Seitaikei Park
- South Pond Park (Minami no Ike)
- South Pumping Station
- Wild Bird Observation Station

== Local events ==
=== Akita Prefectural Rowing Competition - Summer Regatta ===
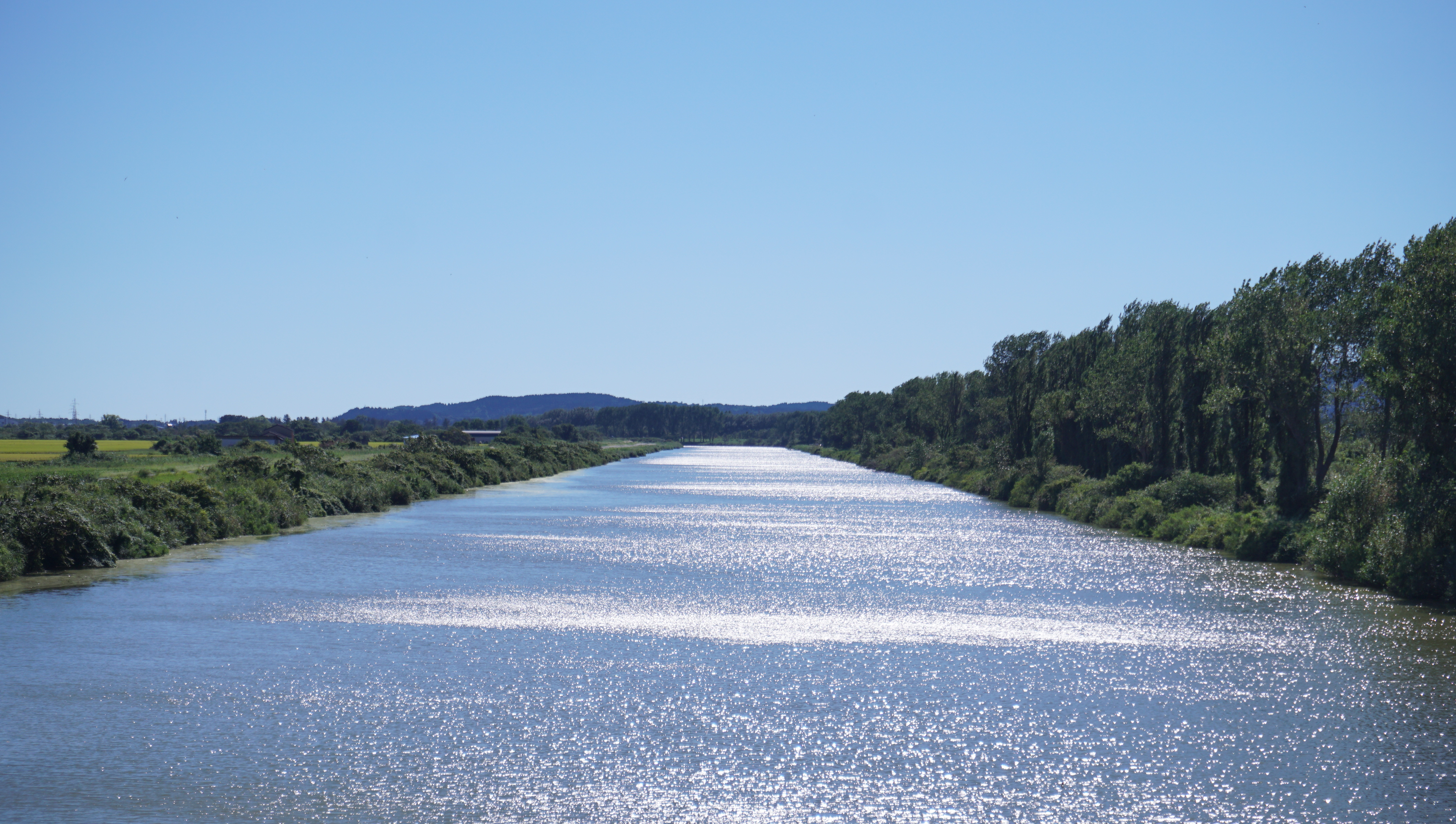
Waterway in Ogata Village

Regatta held in July at the Ogata Rowing Course for village locals. The winning team qualifies for the national regatta.

The village hosted the Danish national rowing team for Tokyo Olympic Games in July 2021.

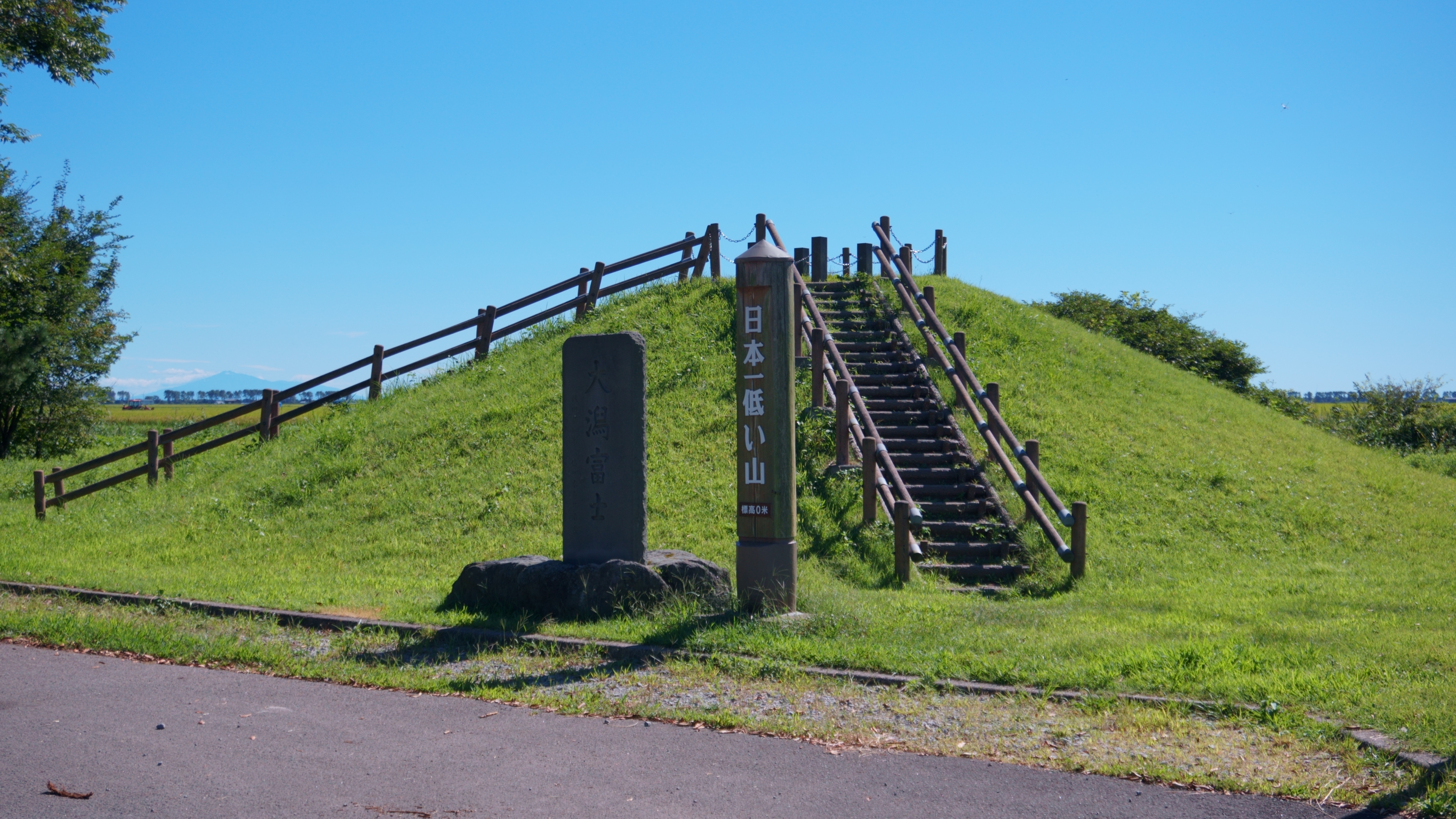
Ogata Fuji

=== Hachirogata Reclamation Memorial Ekiden Relay Race ===
A relay race held at the beginning of September every year to commemorate the reclamation ceremony of September 15, 1964.

=== New Rice Harvest Festival in Ogata ===
Rice tasting and sale of rice and other agricultural products.

=== Ogata Arts and Culture Festival ===
The artistic and cultural groups of Ōgata display their works or perform.

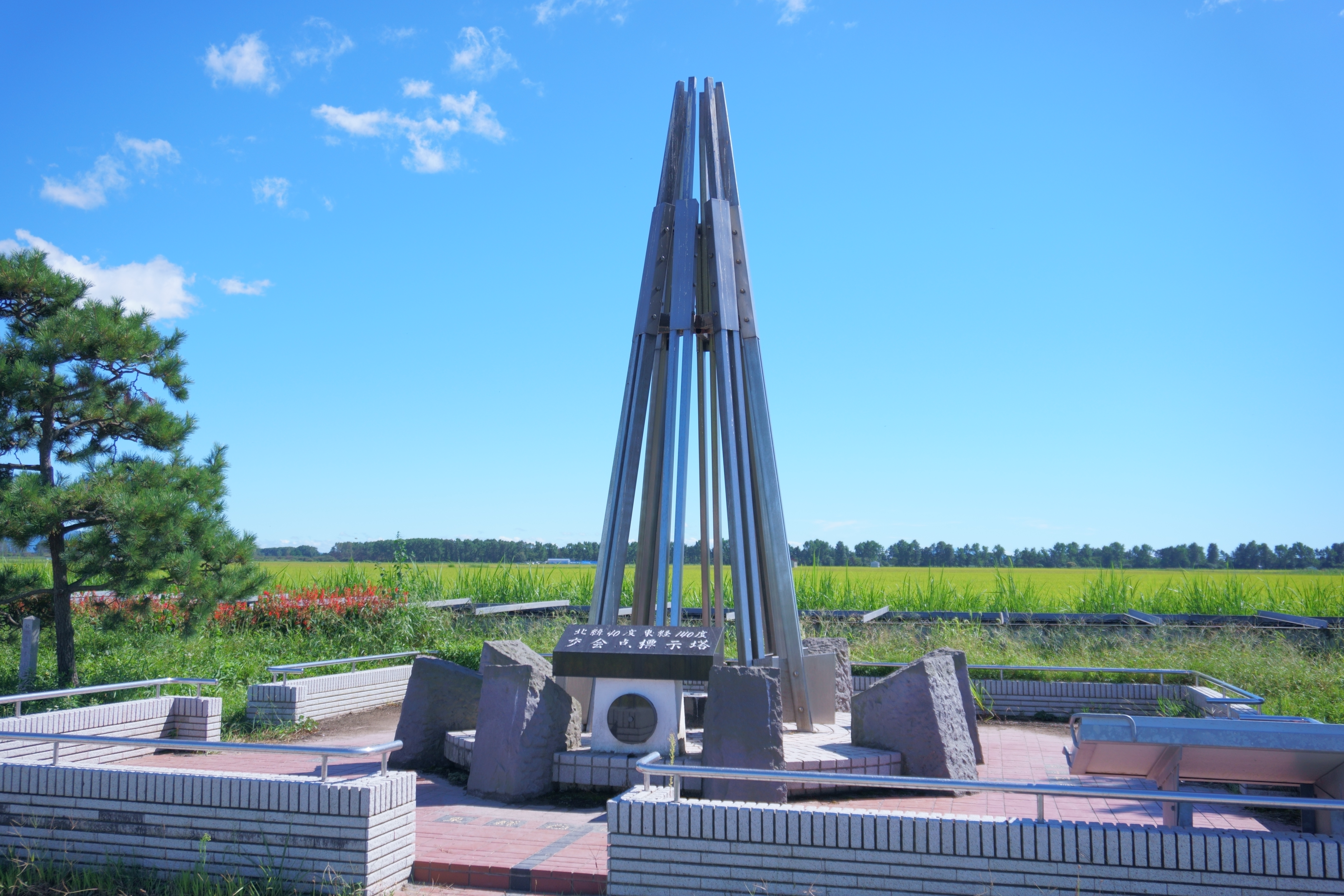
40°N and 140°E Crossing Point

=== Ogata Shrine Reitaisai Festival ===
Shinto festival, which takes place every year on September 10 to pray for a good harvest. The procession makes its way around the village on its way to the shrine.

=== World Econo Move ===
Annual solar and electric vehicle race held in August at the Ōgata Solar Sports Line since 1993.

The village is known internationally for these Solar-car and Eco-car races.

== Oga Peninsula and Ogata Geopark ==
In September 2011, Ōgata and Oga City were approved as a joint member of the Japan Geopark Network.

Approximately 30 km on each side, the relatively compact geopark contains the history of the earth spanning 70 million years into the past, observable complete stratum in near succession, including the separation of the Japanese archipelago from the continent, the formation of the Sea of Japan, and environmental changes due to large-scale climate change that continue through the present day. Also, born from "Hachirogata" the former largest lagoon in Japan, Ōgata is Japan's largest land reclamation.

== Sister cities ==
- Dronten, Flevoland, Netherlands (friendship city)
