= List of shipwrecks in October 1889 =

The list of shipwrecks in October 1889 includes ships sunk, foundered, grounded, or otherwise lost during October 1889.

== 1 October ==
List of shipwrecks: 1 October 1889
Ship	State	Description
Coquette	United Kingdom	The cutter yacht sank in Gourock Bay.
Orwell	United Kingdom	The steamship collided with another vessel and sank in the River Thames near Gravesend, Kent. She was refloated on 6 October and beached at Northfleet, Kent.
Unnamed	Flag unknown	The steamship sank off Llanlliana Head, Anglesey, United Kingdom.

== 2 October ==
List of shipwrecks: 2 October 1889
Ship	State	Description
Carlisle	United Kingdom	The ship ran aground at Tromsø, Norway. She was on a voyage from Tromsø to Great Yarmouth, Norfolk.
Geographique, and Minnie Swift	France; Canada	The steamship Geographique collided with Minnie Swift 40 nautical miles (74 km) off Saint Pierre Island. Minnie Swift sank with the loss of fifteen lives. Twenty-one people were rescued by the barque Petit Codiac ( Canada). Geographique later sank with the loss of more than five lives. About 35 survivors took to three boats; sixteen people in one of the boats were rescued by the schooner Sister Belle ( Canada.
Zulette	United Kingdom	The barque was abandoned in the Atlantic Ocean. Her crew were rescued by Minnie Swift ( Canada). Zulette was on a voyage from Quebec City, Canada to Sunderland, County Durham.
Unnamed	Canada	The schooner capsized at Port Burwell, Ontario with the loss of eight of her eleven crew.

== 3 October ==
List of shipwrecks: 3 October 1889
Ship	State	Description
Corona	United States	The steamboat was destroyed by a boiler explosion in the Mississippi River near Port Hudson, Louisiana with the loss of 35 lives. Forty-five people were rescued by the steamboat City of St. Louis (United States).
Denmark	United Kingdom	The dumb barge was run into by the tug Moselle (United Kingdom) and sank in the River Thames at Southwark, London.
Unnamed	United Kingdom	The barge exploded, caught fire and sank in the River Tyne at Jarrow, Northumberland with the loss of one of the three people on board.

== 4 October ==
List of shipwrecks: 4 October 1889
Ship	State	Description
John Crouch	United Kingdom	The ship collided with a steamship and sank off Skelmorlie, Ayrshire. Her crew were rescued.
Queen	(United Kingdom of Great Britain and Ireland) Jersey	The ship departed from Lique, Côtes-du-Nord, France for Swansea, Glamorgan. No further trace, reported missing.
R. H. G.	United Kingdom	The ship departed from Llanelly, Glamorgan for Aberdeen. No further trace, reported missing.
State of Georgia	United States	The steamship collided with another vessel off the Isle of Arran, Ayrshire. She was on a voyage from Glasgow, Renfrewshire to New York. She put back to Glasgow.
27 unnamed vessels	Flags unknown	The ships were wrecked on Carmen Island, Mexico in a hurricane with much loss of life.

== 5 October ==
List of shipwrecks: 5 October 1889
Ship	State	Description
Eagle	United Kingdom	The steamship was driven ashore and severely damaged at Licata, Sicily, Italy.
Earl Percy	United Kingdom	The paddle tug struck a submerged object and sank in the North Sea off the mouth of the River Tyne. Her crew survived.

== 6 October ==
List of shipwrecks: 6 October 1889
Ship	State	Description
HMS Enterprise	Royal Navy	The Camelion-class sloop was driven ashore and wrecked at Aberffraw, Anglesey. Her crew were rescued. She was being towed from Plymouth, Devon to Liverpool, Lancashire by the tug Liverpool (United Kingdom).
Ferndale	United Kingdom	The steamship collided with the steamship Linares (Flag unknown) in the River Thames at Gravesend, Kent and was damaged.
Golconda	United Kingdom	The steamship ran aground at Ismaila, Ottoman Empire. She was on a voyage from London to Colombo, Ceylon.
Harold	United Kingdom	The steamship was holed by her anchor and put in to Hartlepool, County Durham in a sinking condition. She was on a voyage from Bilbao, Spain to West Hartlepool, County Durham.
Heros	Norway	The barque was driven ashore and wrecked on Hare Island, County Galway, United Kingdom. Her crew were rescued. She was on a voyage from Kingstown, County Dublin to Newport, Monmouthshire, United Kingdom.
Unnamed	Norway	The barque was driven ashore and wrecked at Rhoscolyn, Anglesey. Her eleven crew were rescued by the Holyhead and Rhoscolyn Lifeboats.

== 7 October ==
List of shipwrecks: 7 October 1889
Ship	State	Description
Alert	United Kingdom	The ketch was driven ashore and wrecked at Pwllwaylod, Pembrokeshire. Her crew were rescued. She was on a voyage from Dublin to Gloucester.
Alice T.	United Kingdom	The schooner was driven ashore at Port Erin, Isle of Man.
Blanet	United Kingdom	The fishing boat was driven ashore at Hoylake, Cheshire.
Ella and Ann, or Perseverance	United Kingdom	One of the two fishing trawlers was abandoned off Llandudno, Caernarfonshire. Her crew was rescued by the Llandudno Lifeboat Sunlight No. 1. ( Royal National Lifeboat Institution).
Express	United Kingdom	The steamship was driven ashore and wrecked at Aberffraw, Anglesey. Her crew were rescued by the tug Liverpool (United Kingdom).
Greyhound	United Kingdom	The fishing boat was driven ashore at Hoylake.
Hayle	United Kingdom	The fishing boat was driven ashore at Hoylake.
Irene	United Kingdom	The ship was driven ashore at Ballybunion, County Kerry. She was on a voyage from Liverpool, Lancashire to Clarecastle, County Clare.
Isabella	United Kingdom	The fishing boat was driven ashore at Hoylake.
Jessie M'Clew	United Kingdom	The schooner was driven ashore at Tarbert, Argyllshire. She was refloated on 22 November and taken in to Limerick.
Killie Lass	United Kingdom	The schooner was driven ashore and severely damaged at Portmadoc, Caernarfonshire.
Lizzie Jane	United Kingdom	The schooner was driven ashore and severely damaged at Portmadoc.
Lottie	United Kingdom	The schooner collided with the paddle trawler Alpha (United Kingdom) 15 nautical miles (28 km) off the Spurn Lightship ( Trinity House) and was severely damaged. Lottie was on a voyage from Antwerp, Belgium to Newcastle upon Tyne, Northumberland. She was taken in to Scarborough, Yorkshire.
Lymington	United Kingdom	The schooner was wrecked on the Middle Holm Sand, in the North Sea off the coast of Suffolk. Her six crew were rescued by the Lowestoft Lifeboat Two Sisters ( Royal National Lifeboat Institution). Lyington was on a voyage from Sunderland, County Durham to Eu, Seine-Inférieure, France.
Lymphea	Norway	The brig sank at Cardiff, Glamorgan, United Kingdom.
Margaret	United Kingdom	The schooner was driven ashore in the Menai Strait. She was on a voyage from Caernarfon to Belfast, County Antrim.
Mauritania	United Kingdom	The steamship collided with the barque Emilie Dingle (Italy) with the loss of a crew member. Mauritania was on a voyage from Cardiff to Barcelona, Spain. She put back to Cardiff.
Mayflower	United Kingdom	The fishing boat was driven ashore at Hoylake.
Mount Pleasant	Norway	The full-rigged ship was driven onto the West Hoyle Bank, in Liverpool Bay and was wrecked. She was on a voyage from Quebec City, Canada to Liverpool. All 23 crew were rescued by the Peel Lifeboat John Monk ( Royal National Lifeboat Institution) and by the Liverpool Lifeboat. She was refloated on 11 October and taken in to Liverpool.
Notre Dame d'Espérance	France	The ship was abandoned in the North Sea. Her crew were rescued by the brig Albert Reimann (Germany). Notre Dame d'Espérance was on a voyage from Sundsvall, Norway to Saint-Malo, Ille-et-Vilaine.
Picton	United Kingdom	The schooner was driven ashore and severely damaged at Portmadoc.
Pleione	United Kingdom	The schooner yacht was driven ashore and wrecked at Bangor, County Down. Her crew were rescued by the Coast Guard and local fishermen.
Princess Louise	United Kingdom	The barque was driven onto the Plockington Bank, in Liverpool Bay. She was on a voyage from Quebec City to Liverpool.
Queen	United Kingdom	The fishing boat was driven ashore at Hoylake.
Red Rover	United Kingdom	The schooner was driven ashore and severely damaged at Portmadoc.
Rocket	United Kingdom	The ship was driven ashore at Warrenpoint, County Down.
Sarah Beck	United Kingdom	The fishing boat was driven ashore at Hoylake.
Star of the West	(United Kingdom of Great Britain and Ireland) Guernsey	The schooner was driven ashore at Whitburn, County Durham. She was refloated.
St. George	Norway	The barque was wrecked near Peel, Isle of Man. All 23 people on board were rescued by the Peel Lifeboat John Mann ( Royal National Lifeboat Institution). St. George was on a voyage from Greenock, Renfrewshire, United Kingdom to Montevideo, Uruguay.
Sylvia	United Kingdom	The schooner was driven ashore and severely damaged at Portmadoc.
Zuleika	United Kingdom	The barque was lost in Dingle Bay with the loss of all hands.
Unnamed	United Kingdom	The fishing trawler was abandoned off Llandudno, Caernarfonshire. Her crew were rescued by the Llandudno Lifeboat.
Three unnamed vessels	United Kingdom	The boats, and yachts were sunk or driven ashore at Hoylake.
Three unnamed vessels	United Kingdom	The lighters were driven ashore at Warrenpoint.
Two unnamed vessels	United Kingdom	The lighters were driven ashore between Omeath and Carlingford, County Louth.
Unnamed	United Kingdom	The lighter was reported missing off the coast of County Louth.

== 8 October ==
List of shipwrecks: 8 October 1889
Ship	State	Description
Belt	United Kingdom	The schooner was driven into the breakwater at Holyhead, Anglesey and capsized. Her crew survived.
Hartlow	Canada	The full-rigged ship was abandoned off Aberystwyth, Cardiganshire, United Kingdom. Her crew were rescued by the Aberystwyth Lifeboat.
Hispania	Netherlands	The steamship ran aground on The Shingles, off the Isle of Wight, United Kingdom.
HMS Icarus	Royal Navy	The Mariner-class gunvessel ran aground in Plumper Sound. She was on a voyage from New Westminster to Esquimalt, British Columbia, Canada. She had been refloated by 10 October and taken in to Esquimalt.
Leonora	Germany	The brig sprang a leak and was abandoned with the loss of three of her seven crew. She was on a voyage from Blyth, Northumberland, United Kingdom to Leer.
Primus	United Kingdom	The schooner foundered off the mouth of the River Dee with the loss of all handa.
Reliance	United Kingdom	The schooner was abandoned 4 nautical miles (7.4 km) off St. Dogmaels, Cardiganshire with the loss of one of her four crew. The three remaining crew were rescued by the Newport Lifeboat Clevedon.

== 9 October ==
List of shipwrecks: 9 October 1889
Ship	State	Description
Ellesmere	United Kingdom	The schooner sank at Conway, Caernarfonshire.

== 11 October ==
List of shipwrecks: 11 October 1889
Ship	State	Description
Cairngorm	United Kingdom	The steamship ran aground on the Tybee Knoll, off the coast of Georgia, United States.
Venice	United Kingdom	The steamship ran aground on the Tybee Knoll.
Volga	France	The steamship ran aground at the entrance to Lake Timsah. She was refloated.

== 12 October ==
List of shipwrecks: 12 October 1889
Ship	State	Description
America	Spain	The barque was driven ashore at Cape Santa Pola.
Coptic	United Kingdom	The mail steamer struck a rock on Mai Island off Rio de Janeiro, Brazil, after sailing from there for Plymouth, Devon. She floated off, but forward compartments were flooded and she returned to port for repairs, resuming her voyage from Rio de Janeiro on 30 October.
Grimsel	United Kingdom	The steamship was driven ashore on Inchkeith, Fife. Her passengers were taken off.
State of Nebraska	United Kingdom	The steamship collided with the steamship Norwegian (United Kingdom) and was driven ashore in the Clyde. She was refloated and taken in to Greenock, Renfrewshire for repairs.

== 13 October ==
List of shipwrecks: 13 October 1889
Ship	State	Description
Crest	United Kingdom	The steamship put in to Castro Urdiales, Spain and sank. She was on a voyage from Bilbao, Spain to Antwerp, Belgium. She was refloated on 24 November but sank again.
Telegraf	Norway	The brig struck a sunken wreck and sprang a leak. She was towed in to Dover, Kent, United Kingdom.

== 15 October ==
List of shipwrecks: 15 October 1889
Ship	State	Description
Craiglie	United Kingdom	The steamship ran aground in the River Tees. She was on a voyage from the River Tees to Algoa Bay. She was refloated on 20 October.
Malta	United Kingdom	The ocean liner was wrecked north of Wheal Castle, St Just in Penwith, Cornwall with the loss of one of the 62 people on board. Survivord were rescued by the Pendeen Lifeboat. Malta was on a cruise from Liverpool, Lancashire to the Mediterranean Sea.
Thesis	United Kingdom	The steamship ran aground and sank at Inninmore Point, Argyllshire. Her eleven crew survived. She was on a voyage from Belfast, County Antrim to Middlesbrough, Yorkshire.

== 16 October ==
List of shipwrecks: 16 October 1889
Ship	State	Description
Acaster	United Kingdom	The steamship ran aground at Swansea, Glamorgan.
Thesis	United Kingdom	The cargo ship struck a reef at the south end of the Sound of Mull between the Isle of Mull and Inninmore Point and sank four hours later. Her eleven crew abandoned ship safely.

== 18 October ==
List of shipwrecks: 18 October 1889
Ship	State	Description
Apollo	United Kingdom	The ketch was driven ashore and wrecked at Lossiemouth, Lothian. Her crew were rescued by rocket apparatus.
Bracklesby	United Kingdom	The ship was run into by the steamship Durham and sank in the River Thames at North Woolwich, London.
Hercules	Germany	The steamship collided with the steamship Deronda (United Kingdom) and sank off the Berlengas, Portugal. Her crew were rescued by the steamship Bellerophon (United Kingdom).
Harkaway	United Kingdom	The tug was run into by the steamship Neptune (Germany) and was beached.
Liberta	United Kingdom	The schooner struck the pier at Lossiemouth and was damaged.

== 19 October ==
List of shipwrecks: 19 October 1889
Ship	State	Description
Aurore	France	The brigantine was driven ashore and wrecked at Woolacombe, Devon. United Kingdom with the loss of one of her seven crew.
Imbro	United Kingdom	The steamship ran aground in the Clyde. She was on a voyage from Glasgow, Renfrewshire to Saint-Nazaire, Loire-Inférieure, France. She was refloated the next day.
Kate	United Kingdom	The barquentine was abandoned in the North Sea 6 nautical miles (11 km) off Flamborough Head, Yorkshire. Her six crew were rescued by the steamship Wynyard Park (United Kingdom). Kate was on a voyage from South Shields, County Durham to Great Yarmouth, Norfolk. The derelict vessel was driven ashore and wrecked at Bridlington, Yorkshire.
Marcobrunner	Germany	The steamship ran aground on the Shabaly Reef, in the Red Sea, and was wrecked. Her crew were rescued by HMS Plover (Royal Navy). Marcobrunner was on a voyage from Bremen to Calcutta, India. The wreck was plundered by the local inhabitants and set afire in late October.

== 20 October ==
List of shipwrecks: 20 October 1889
Ship	State	Description
Starling	United Kingdom	The ketch collided with the steamship Stelling (United Kingdom) and sank off Orfordness, Suffolk with the loss of two of her four crew. Starling was on a voyage from Hull, Yorkshire to Gravesend, Kent.
West	United Kingdom	The steamship was driven ashore in Poole Bay.

== 21 October ==
List of shipwrecks: 21 October 1889
Ship	State	Description
Carl D. Lathrop	United States	The schooner sprang a leak and capsized 10 miles (16 km) south southwest of the Cape St. George Lighthouse, Florida.
Titan	United Kingdom	The steamship ran aground in the Suez Canal. She was refloated.

== 22 October ==
List of shipwrecks: 22 October 1889
Ship	State	Description
Hirondelle	United Kingdom	The yacht was driven ashore at Killala, County Mayo. She was refloated the next day and taken in to Killala in a leaky condition.
J. H. Hustede	Germany	The barque departed from Victoria, British Columbia, Canada for London, United Kingdom. No further trace, reported missing.

== 23 October ==
List of shipwrecks: 23 October 1889
Ship	State	Description
Abergeldie, and Aldborough	United Kingdom	The ship Abergeldie collided with the barge Aldborough in the River Thames at Barking, Essex and ran aground. She was on a voyage from London to Sundsvall, Sweden. she was refloated and resumed her voyage. Aldborough sank as a result of the collision.
Cintra	United Kingdom	The steamship caught fire off Bardsey Island, Pembrokeshire. The fire was extinguished She was on a voyage from Porto, Portugal to the River Mersey.
Hispania	United Kingdom	The steamship was driven ashore. She was refloated and put in to Trieste.
Perseverance	United States	The schooner was wrecked on the "Londoner".

== 24 October ==
List of shipwrecks: 24 October 1889
Ship	State	Description
Charlotte	United Kingdom	The barge was run into by the steamship Stahleck (Germany) and sank in the River Thames at Blackwall, London.

== 25 October ==
List of shipwrecks: 25 October 1889
Ship	State	Description
Gladys, and Lead On	United Kingdom	The pilot boats collided off the Bull Point Lighthouse, Devon. Both vessels sank. Their crews were rescued by the barque Camoulso (Norway).
Lagan Maid	United Kingdom	The steam launch was destroyed by fire at Belfast, County Antrim.
Mabel	United Kingdom	The ship collided with Briton and sank at Widnes, Cheshire.
Mary Ann Jane	United Kingdom	The ship collided with the steamship Llewellyn (United Kingdom) and sank in the Belfast Lough with the loss of a crew member. She was refloated in mid-November and taken in to Belfast, County Antrim.

== 26 October ==
List of shipwrecks: 26 October 1889
Ship	State	Description
Dartmouth, and Othello	United Kingdom	The barges were run into by the steam cutter Albatross (United Kingdom) and sank in the River Thames at Northfleet, Kent.
Derwent	United Kingdom	The steamship was run into by the steamship Castle Rising (United Kingdom) off King's Lynn, Norfolk and damaged.
Ethel	United Kingdom	The steamship collided with the steamship Minerva (Flag unknown) in the Thames Esturary. Ethel was on a voyage from Tilbury, Essex to Dunkerque, Nord, France. She put back to Tilbury.
Kullen, and Martinus	Sweden	The steamship Kullen and the schooner Martinus collided at sea. Both vessels put in to Gothenburg. Kullen was on a voyage from Bergen, Norway to Stettin, Germany. Martinus was on a voyage from "Wasoe" to London, United Kingdom.
Magore, and Toledo	Sweden; United Kingdom	The steamships collided at Cronstadt, Russia.
Unnamed	Netherlands	The fishing smack was run down and sunk at Ijmuiden, North Holland by the steamship Granton (United Kingdom). Her crew were rescued.

== 27 October ==
List of shipwrecks: 27 October 1889
Ship	State	Description
Chicago	United Kingdom	The steamship ran aground in the Scheldt. She was on a voyage from Antwerp, Belgium to Boston, Lincolnshire. She was refloated and resumed her voyage.
James	United Kingdom	The barge was run into by the steamship Winsloe (United Kingdom) and sank in the River Thames at Woolwich, London with the loss of a crew member.
Louis	France	The steamship ran aground at the mouth of the Rhône. She was on a voyage from "Lanouvelle" to Marseille, Bouches-du-Rhône. She was refloated and towed in to Port-de-Bouc, Bouches-du-Rhône.
Maastroom	Netherlands	The steamship ran aground in the River Thames at Coalhouse Point, Essex, United Kingdom. She was on a voyage from Rotterdam, South Holland to London, United Kingdom.
Mary Ann	United Kingdom	The schooner was driven ashore at Bray, County Wicklow. Her crew were rescued. She was on a voyage from Liverpool, Lancashire to Dublin.
Winsloe	United Kingdom	The steamship ran aground in the River Thames near Northfleet, Kent. She was on a voyage from Rotterdam to London. She was refloated and resumed her voyage.

== 28 October ==
List of shipwrecks: 28 October 1889
Ship	State	Description
Mary L. Varney	United States	The schooner was wrecked on the "Salvages".
Unnamed	United Kingdom	The launch sank at Gravesend, Kent.

== 29 October ==
List of shipwrecks: 29 October 1889
Ship	State	Description
Clio	United Kingdom	The steamship caught fire at Gloucester. She was on a voyage from Rotterdam, South Holland, Netherlands to Gloucester.
Glenrath	United Kingdom	The steamship ran aground on the Kongedlyset, in the Baltic Sea. She was on a voyage from Riga, Russia to London. She was refloated the next day and taken in to Copenhage, Denmark. She subsequently resumed her voyage.

== 30 October ==
List of shipwrecks: 30 October 1889
Ship	State	Description
Alcedo	Spain	The steamship ran aground on the Shipwash Sand, in the North Sea off the coast of Suffolk, United Kingdom. She was on a voyage from Newcastle upon Tyne. Northumberland, United Kingdom to Bilbao. She was refloated with assistance from the Aldeburgh Lifeboat and the tug Harwich (United Kingdom) and towed in to Harwich, Essex, United Kingdom.
Cheseborough	United States	The wreck of Cheseborough The full-rigged ship was wrecked in the Pacific Ocean off the coast of Shariki, Aomori Prefecture, Japan, during a typhoon with the loss of nineteen of her 23 crew.
Elizabeth	United Kingdom	The barge was run into by the steamship Madeline (United Kingdom) and sank off the Mucking Lightship ( Trinity House) with the loss of a crew member.
Japanese	United Kingdom	The steamship struck the quayside at Cardiff, Glamorgan and was severely damaged.
Lady Blessington	Norway	The barque was severely damaged by fire at Cardiff.
Oldham	United Kingdom	The steamship collided with the pier at Grimsby, Lincolnshire and was severely damaged. She was on a voyage from Hamburg, Germany to Grimsby.
Star of Tay	United Kingdom	The paddle trawler was driven ashore and wrecked at Milford Haven, Pembrokeshire. Her crew survived.
Ticino	United Kingdom	The ship ran aground at Teignmouth, Devon.

== 31 October ==
List of shipwrecks: 31 October 1889
Ship	State	Description
Batavia	United Kingdom	The barge broke in two in the English Channel. Her five crew survived. She was being towed from Antwerp, Belgium to Portishead, Somerset by the tug White Rose (United Kingdom).
Bernhard	Germany	The brig was last seen on this date whilst on a voyage from Montevideo, Uruguay to Pernambuco, Brazil. No further trace, reported missing.
Catharina	Norway	The barque was driven ashore in St. Aubins Bay. She was refloated and taken in to Saint Aubin, Jersey, Channel Islands in a leaky condition.
Poseidon	Norway	The barque was wrecked at Port Elizabeth, Cape Colony. Her crew were rescued.
Shannon	United Kingdom	The steamship ran aground on the Formby Bank, in Liverpool Bay. Her five crew were rescued by a gig from the Formby Lightship ( Trinity House). Shannon was on a voyage from Dalbeattie, Kirkcudbrightshire to Preston, Lancashire.

== Unknown date ==
List of shipwrecks: Unknown date in October 1889
Ship	State	Description
Achilles	United Kingdom	The steamship ran aground on the Shipwash Sand, in the North Sea off the coast of Suffolk. She was refloated with assisance from the tug Harwich (United Kingdom and two lifeboats, one of which was Duke of Northumberland ( Royal National Lifeboat Institution), and towed in to Harwich, Essex.
Adelfi Eustathion	Greece	The barque collided with a steamship off Lundy Island, Devon, United Kingdom and was severely damaged. She put in to Cardiff, Glamorgan, United Kingdom for repairs.
Alice Otto	United Kingdom	The steamship ran aground on the Meloria Bank, off Livorno, Italy. She was refloated and taken in to Livorno.
Alivia A. Carrigon	Flag unknown	The ship was driven ashore and wrecked at San Juan Bautista.
Alliance	United Kingdom	The steamship arrived at Kingstown, County Dublin in a sinking condition. She was on a voyage from Garston, Lancashire to Kingstown.
Alphia	Flag unknown	The ship was lost in a hurricane in the Gulf of Mexico.
Amy Dora	Flag unknown	The steamship was driven ashore near Baltimore, Maryland, United States.
Arethusa	United Kingdom	The barque was lost at sea before 7 October. Thirteen of her crew were reported missing. She was on a voyage from South Shields, County Durham to Valparaíso, Chile.
Astronomer	United Kingdom	The steamship ran aground on the Blyth Sand, in the Thames Estuary. She was on a voyage from Calcutta, India to London. She was refloated on 26 October with the assistance of six tugs.
Aurore	France	The schooner was driven ashore at Woolscombe, Devon with the loss of one of her five crew. She subsequently became a wreck.
Baltimore	United States	The steamship was driven ashore at Baltimore, Maryland. She was refloated with the assistance of a steamship and resumed her voyage.
Barbara	Flag unknown	The ship was lost in a hurricane in the Gulf of Mexico.
Brocklesby	United Kingdom	The brig was run into by the steamship Durham (United Kingdom) and sank in the River Thames at North Woolwich, London.
Buena Ventura	Spain	The steamship was wrecked at the mouth of the Rhône. She was on a voyage from Alicante to Cette, Hérault, France.
Canopus	United Kingdom	The steamship was driven ashore and wrecked at "St. Valier", Quebec, Canada. She was on a voyage from Quebec City, Canada to Liverpool, Lancashire. She was later refloated and put back to Quebec City for repairs.
Carlton	United Kingdom	The ship caught fire at Savannah, Georgia, United States. She was on a voyage from Savannah to Liverpool. The fire was extinguished.
Cherbourg	France	The barque was driven ashore at Arholma, Sweden. She was refloated and taken in to Stockholm in a leaky condition.
Cherokee	United States	The steamship arrived at New York on fire.
Cheseborough	United States	The steamship was driven ashore at Hakodate, Japan. She was on a voyage from Hakodate to New York.
City of New York	United States	The steamship ran aground at Sandy Hook, New Jersey before 10 October.
Cleopatra, and Crystal Wave	United States	The steamships collided. Both vessels sank.
Clieveden	United Kingdom	The steamship collided with the barque Laigla (Italy) in the Mediterranean Sea and was damaged. Clieveden put in to Malta.
Condor	Germany	The steamship was driven shore at Ossby, Öland, Sweden.
Corbillo	Italy	The brig sank at Batoum, Russia.
Crodrene	Flag unknown	The ship was lost in a hurricane in the Gulf of Mexico.
Crœsus	Flag unknown	The steamship was driven ashore at Skellefteå, Sweden. She was later refloated and taken in to "Bjurobay", Sweden.
Crusader	United Kingdom	The brig was driven ashore near Stockholm, Sweden.
Currataco	Flag unknown	The ship was lost in a hurricane in the Gulf of Mexico.
Dido	United Kingdom	The steamship collided with the steamship Cavendish (United Kingdom) and sank off Málaga, Spain. Her crew were rescued.
Dunelm	United Kingdom	The steamship ran aground on the Shipwash Sand. She was refloated with assistance from the tug Harwich (United Kingdom).
Eliza	Flag unknown	The ship was lost in a hurricane in the Gulf of Mexico.
Elizabeth	Denmark	The schooner was driven ashore on Anholt. She was later refloated and taken in to Helsingør, Denmark in a severely damaged condition.
Esk	United Kingdom	The steamship was driven ashore on Kronborg Point, Denmark. She was on a voyage from Kronstadt, Russia to Wisbech, Cambridgeshire. She was refloated and taken in to Helsingør.
Esperance	United Kingdom	The barque was driven ashore at Lemvik, Norway and was abandoned by her crew.
Ergelhorn	United Kingdom	The launch was driven ashore and wrecked at Saltfleet Haven, Lincolnshire.
Esperanza	United Kingdom	The schooner ran aground at "Dracko", Denmark. She was on a voyage from Oulu, Grand Duchy of Finland to Hartlepool, County Durham.
Evelyn	United Kingdom	The steamship caught fire at Savannah, Georgia.
Fanny Scholfield, and Fez Rehman	Flags unknown	The ships collided at the Sandheads, India. Both vessels were severely damaged.
Flora Woodhouse	Flag unknown	The ship was lost in a hurricane in the Gulf of Mexico.
Giuseppe Anna	Italy	The barque was driven ashore near Diamond Island, Burma. She was a total loss.
Guido Rosa	Italy	The barque was driven ashore near Cádiz, Spain. She was on a voyage from Colón, Columbia to Marseille, Bouches-du-Rhône, France.
Haabet	Flag unknown	The ship was lost in a hurricane in the Gulf of Mexico.
Hebe, and Horneburg	Norway; United Kingdom	The barque Hebe collided with the steamship Horneburg. Both vessels were severely damaged. Hebe was on a voyage from Philadelphia, Pennsylvania, United States to Königsberg, Germany. She put in to Fredrikshavn, Denmark. Horneburg was on a voyage from Blyth, Northumberland to Swinemünde, Germany. She put in to Gothenburg, Sweden.
Hosianna	Germany	The steamship was driven ashore at North Queensferry, Fife, United Kingdom. She was on a voyage from St. David's, Fife to Varel.
Howard A. Turner	United Kingdom	The ship was driven ashore on Grand Manan, New Brunswick, Canada. She was on a voyage from Hillsborough, New Brunswick to Dublin. Howard A. Turner was refloated and put in to Saint John, New Brunswick in a leaky condition. She was placed under repair.
Idea	Italy	The barque caught fire in the Atlantic Ocean and was abandoned. Her crew were rescued by the barque Eulalia (Sweden). Idea was on a voyage from Hamburg, Germany to Buenos Aires, Argentina.
Itunel	United Kingdom	The barque sank in the Kenmare River. Her crew were rescued.
Johannes	Greece	The barque was wrecked at Batoum. Her crew were rescued.
John Maclaggan	Flag unknown	The ship was lost in a hurricane in the Gulf of Mexico.
John Morrison	United Kingdom	The steamship ran aground at Maassluis, South Holland, Netherlands. She was on a voyage from Brăila, Romania to Rotterdam, South Holland. She was later refloated.
Josephine	Norway	The brig ran aground at Hillion, Côtes-du-Nord, France. She was on a voyage from Sundsvall, Sweden to Légué.
Kamehameba IV	Brazil	The ship was driven ashore at Bahía Blanca. She was refloated and taken in to port.
Kate Foster	United States	The schooner was abandoned in the Atlantic Ocean on or before 19 October. Her crew were rescued by the steamship Ettrick (United Kingdom). Kate Foster was on a voyage from Advocate Harbour, Newfoundland Colony to New York.
Laquana	Flag unknown	The ship was lost in a hurricane in the Gulf of Mexico.
Larissa	United Kingdom	The ship ran aground on the Shipwash Sand. Her eight crew were rescued by the Harwich Lifeboat.
Lero	Flag unknown	The steamship was driven ashore near Baltimore, Maryland, United States. She was on a voyage from Baltimor to Rotterdam, South Holland, Netherlands.
Llandaff	United Kingdom	The collier was wrecked at Land's End, Cornwall. She was repaired and returned to service.
Luisa	Flag unknown	The ship was lost in a hurricane in the Gulf of Mexico.
Marie Agostini	Flag unknown	The ship was lost in a hurricane in the Gulf of Mexico.
Martin	United Kingdom	The smack was wrecked on the Carr Rock.
Martin	United Kingdom	The smack was wrecked at Craster, Northumberland. She was on a voyage from Craster to Leith, Lothian.
Mauritania	United Kingdom	The steamship was driven ashore at Sabinal Point, Spain.
Mayflower	United Kingdom	The schooner was driven ashore north of Helsingborg, Sweden. She was on a voyage from Hamburg to a Baltic Port. She was refloated and taken in to Helsingør for repairs.
Mertola	United Kingdom	The ship ran aground at Pará, Brazil. She was on a voyage from the Cape Verde Islands to Pará.
Metsola	Norway	The barque was wrecked at Cape Ray, Newfoundland Colony. Her crew were rescued. She was on a voyage from Maryport, Cumberland, United Kingdom to Quebec City.
Mjoesen	Norway	The brig was abandoned in the North Sea. She was on a voyage from Drammen, Norway to London. She was subsequently towed in to IJmuiden, North Holland, Netherlands by Hispania (Flag unknown).
Monte Rosa	Germany	The steamship ran aground at Maassluis. She was on a voyage from Sulina, Romania to Rotterdam. She was later refloated.
Morning Star	Flag unknown	The ship was lost in a hurricane in the Gulf of Mexico.
Newbattle	United Kingdom	The steamship was driven ashore at "Walsoarne", in the Gulf of Bothnia near Wasa, Finland.
North Sea Queen	United Kingdom	The ship ran aground on a rock at Bruckless, County Donegal. She was refloated with the assistance of four smacks but consequently sank.
Nuevo	Flag unknown	The ship was lost in a hurricane in the Gulf of Mexico.
Olga	Norway	The brig collided with the steamship Coln (Germany). She was also driven ashore. Olga was on a voyage from Liverpool to Vyborg, Grand Duchy of Finland. She put in to Helsingør.
Otus	Norway	The barque ran aground near Buenos Aires. She was on a voyage from Brunswick, Georgia, United States to Rosario, Argentina.
Phaeton	United Kingdom	The ship was destroyed by fire in the Caicos Islands. Her crew survived.
Phœnix	Norway	The barque was wrecked off Alvarado. She was on a voyage from Galveston, Texas, United States to Tuspan River, Mexico.
Pius	Norway	The schooner was abandoned at sea. She was subsequently towed in to Frederikshavn, Denmark.
Princess	United Kingdom	The steamship was damaged by fire at Galveston, Texas, United States.
Sea Nymph	Flag unknown	The ship was lost in a hurricane in the Gulf of Mexico.
Shakespeare	Germany	The barque was towed in to Rio de Janeiro, Brazil in a sinking condition. She was on a voyage from Hamburg to Buenos Aires.
Sindoro	Norway	The barque was abandoned at sea. Her crew were rescued. She was on a voyage from Cardiff to Buenos Aires.
Spiridon Vagliano	Greece	The steamship was driven ashore in Sarisiglar Bay, Ottoman Empire. She was on a voyage from Newport, Monmouthshire, United Kingdom to Constantinople, Ottoman Empire. She was refloated and resumed her voyage.
Spotless	United States	The schooner was abandoned in the Atlantic Ocean before 31 October.
St. Catherine	United Kingdom	The schooner was driven ashore on Whiddy Island, County Cork and was severely damaged.
Stella	Norway	The barque ran aground on the English Bank, in the River Plate.
Taroba	Queensland	The steamship struck a rock at Mackay and was beached. She had been refloated by 14 October.
Terpsichore	United Kingdom	The barque was driven ashore at Mille-Vaches, Quebec. She was on a voyage from Liverpool to Quebec City.
Tredegar	United Kingdom	The steamship ran aground in the Danube. She was refloated and taken in to Sulina, Romania.
Trinacria	United Kingdom	The steamship caught fire at New Orleans, Louisiana, United States. The fire was extinguished.
Tuscany	United Kingdom	The steamship was driven ashore in the Seine at Bapeaume, Seine-Inférieure, France.
Tvendre Brodres Minde	Norway	The ship was abandoned at sea. She was subsequently towed in to Soggendal.
Unionist	United Kingdom	The steamship suffered an onboard explosion and caught fire at sea. She was on a voyage from Liverpool to New York, United States. The fire was extinguished after burning for a week and she completed her voyage.
Ursula	Germany	The full-rigged ship was driven ashore on Terschelling, Friesland, Netherlands. She was on a voyage from Bassein, Burma to Bremen.
Venus	United Kingdom	The tug was run into by the steamship Clutha at Newcastle upon Tyne, Northumberland and was severely damaged.
Welcome Home	United Kingdom	The ship was wrecked at Filey, Yorkshire. Her crew were rescued. She was on a voyage from Hull, Yorkshire to Filey.
West	United Kingdom	The steamship was driven ashore in Poole Bay.
William	United Kingdom	The schooner was driven ashore at Saltfleet Haven.
William C. Mitchell	United Kingdom	The steamship caught fire at Charleston, South Carolina, United States.
William Hull	United Kingdom	The schooner was driven ashore and wrecked at Saltfleet Haven.
William Stonard	United Kingdom	The ship foundered off the coast of County Kerry.
Willie M'Laren	New Zealand	The ship struck a rock and foundered off Wellington.
Zephyr	United Kingdom	The ship was driven ashore and wrecked at Port Elizabeth. Her crew were rescued.
Unnamed	Netherlands	The fishing smack was run down and sunk at IJmujiden by the steamship Granton (United Kingdom). All on board were rescued.
Unnamed	Ottoman Empire	The ship was driven ashore at Batoum. She was a total loss.
