= Koshimizu Station =

Railway station in Tsugaru, Aomori Prefecture, Japan

Koshimizu Station 越水駅
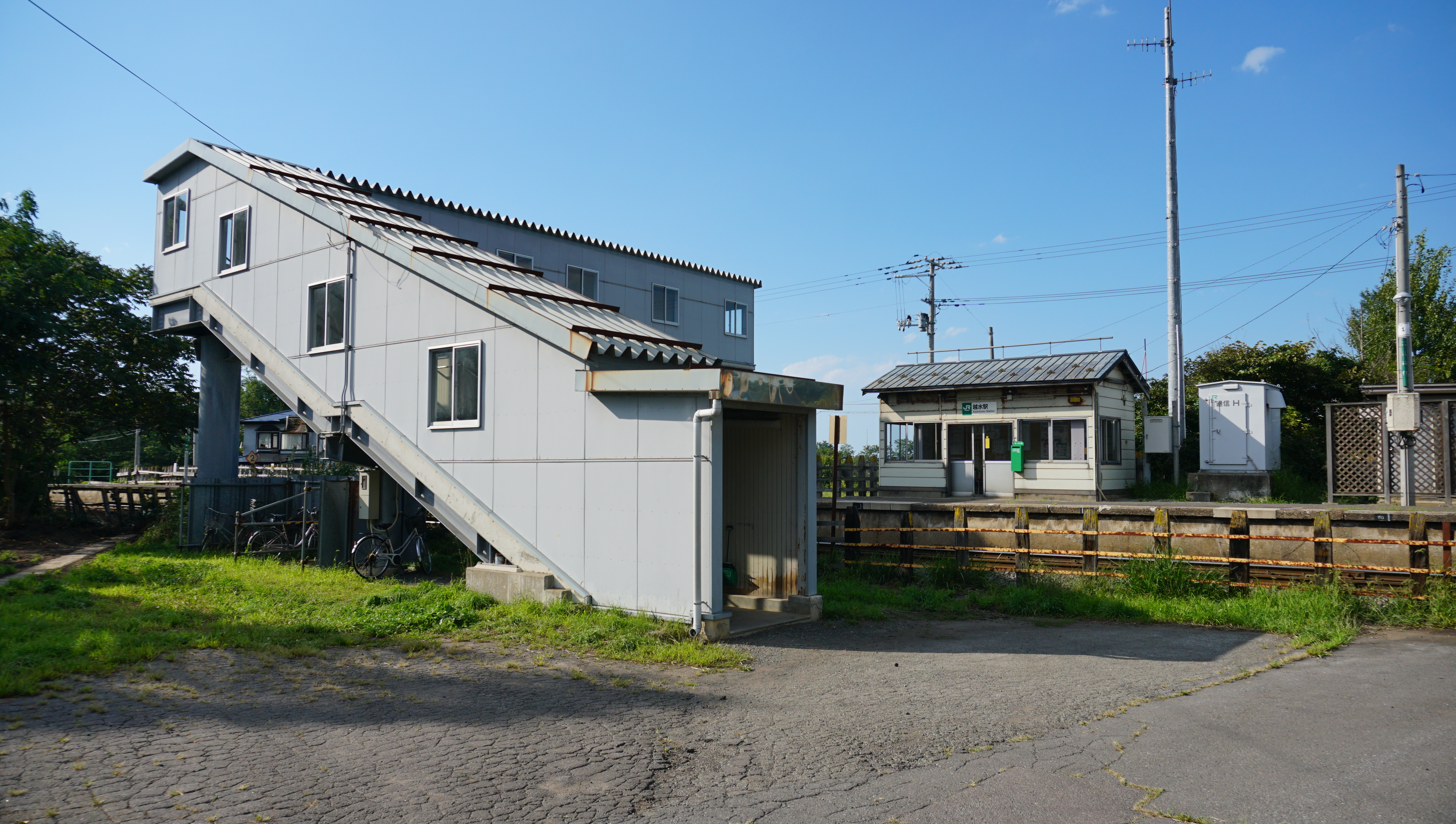
- Koshimizu Station in September 2019

General information
- Location: 32 Ōdate Hirogataira, Morita-chō, Tsugaru-shi, Aomori-ken 038-2818; Japan
- Coordinates: 40°47′14.13″N 140°17′55.24″E
- Operator: JR East
- Line: ■ Gonō Line
- Distance: 111.0 km from Higashi-Noshiro
- Platforms: 1 side platform

Other information
- Status: Unstaffed
- Website: Official website (in Japanese)

History
- Opened: November 20, 1929

Services
Preceding station	JR East	Following station
Narusawa towards Higashi-Noshiro	Gonō Line Rapid	Mutsu-Morita One-way operation
Narusawa towards Higashi-Noshiro	Gonō Line Local	Mutsu-Morita towards Hirosaki
Location
- Location within Japan

Koshimizu Station (越水駅, Koshimizu-eki) is a railway station in the city of Tsugaru, Aomori Prefecture, Japan, operated by the East Japan Railway Company (JR East).

== Lines ==
The station is on the Gonō Line 111.0 kilometres (69.0 mi) from the terminus of the line at Higashi-Noshiro.

== Station layout ==
The station has one ground-level side platform serving a single bi-directional track. There is a small waiting room on the platform but no station building. The station is unattended.

== History ==
The station was opened on November 20, 1954, in the former village of Morita, Nishitsugaru District. With the privatization of Japan National Railways on April 1, 1987, it came under the operational control of JR East.

== Surrounding area ==
- National Route 101
