= Takayama Inari Shrine =

Shinto shrine in Aomori Prefecture, Japan

- 高山稲荷神社
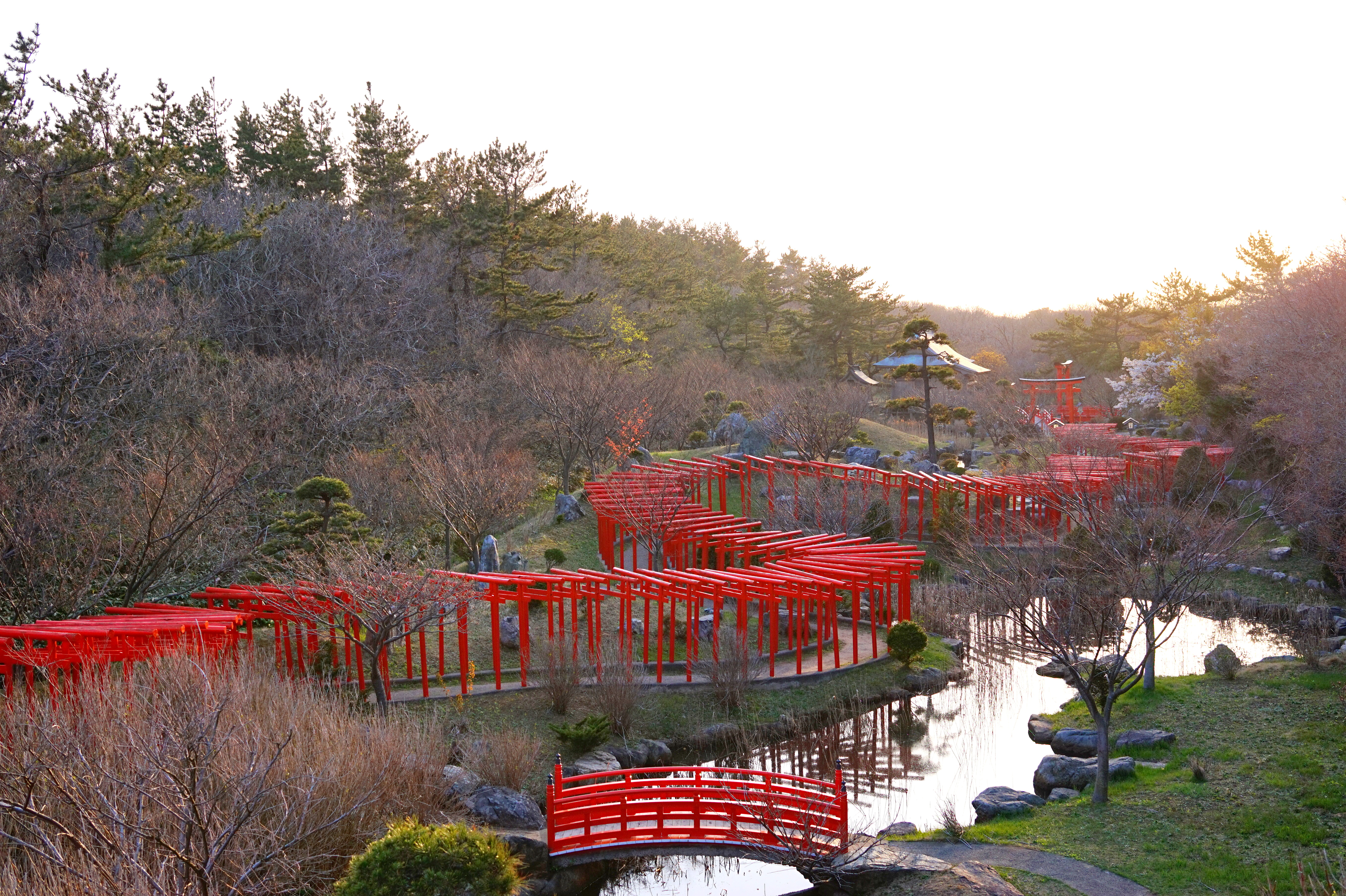
- Torii winding through the grounds of the shrine.

- Location within Aomori Prefecture Location within Japan

Religion
- Affiliation: Shinto

Location
- Location: Tsugaru, Aomori, Japan
- Interactive map of Takayama Inari Shrine
- Coordinates: 40.9385°N 140.3124°E

Takayama Inari Shrine (高山稲荷神社, Takayama Inari Jinja) is a Shinto shrine located in the city of Tsugaru, Aomori Prefecture, Japan. The shrine is dedicated to Inari Ōkami. Takayama Inari Shrine is notable for the many red torii that wind along its path. It is said that this shrine had already been established in the late 17th century. Next to the shrine is a memorial dedicated to American sailors who died in 1889 when full-rigged ship Cheseborough wrecked off the coast of Shariki Village (now a part of Tsugaru) during a typhoon.
