= Kasose Station =

Railway station in Fukaura, Aomori Prefecture, Japan

Kasose Station 風合瀬駅
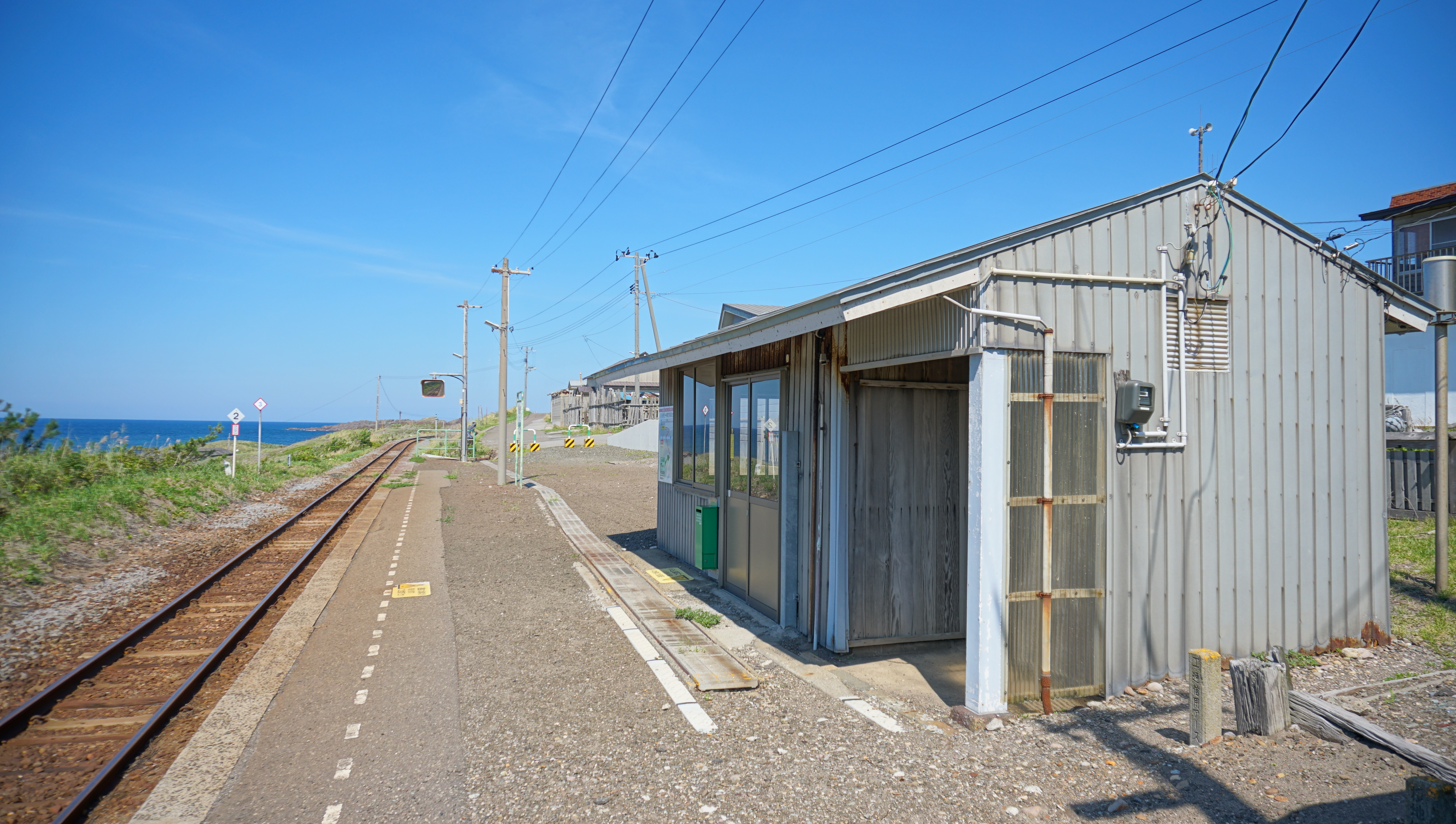
- Kasose Station in September 2019

General information
- Location: Kasose, Fukaura Town, Nishitsugaru District, Aomori Prefecture 038-2411; Japan
- Coordinates: 40°43′55.65″N 139°59′40.02″E
- Operator: JR East
- Line: Gonō Line
- Distance: 79.0 km (49.1 mi) from Higashi-Noshiro
- Platforms: 1 side platform
- Tracks: 1

Construction
- Structure type: At grade

Other information
- Status: Unstaffed
- Website: Official website (in Japanese)

History
- Opened: 20 November 1954; 71 years ago

Services
Preceding station	JR East	Following station
Todoroki towards Higashi-Noshiro	Gonō Line Local	Ōdose towards Hirosaki
Location
- Location within Aomori Prefecture Location within Tohoku, Japan Location within Japan

Kasose Station (風合瀬駅, Kasose-eki) is a railway station located in the town of Fukaura, Aomori Prefecture, Japan, operated by the East Japan Railway Company (JR East).

== Lines ==
Kasose Station is a station on the Gonō Line, and is located 79.0 kilometers from the terminus of the line at Higashi-Noshiro.

== Station layout ==
Kasose Station has one ground-level side platform serving a single bi-directional track. The station is unattended and is managed from Goshogawara Station. There is no station building.

== History ==
Kosose Station was opened on November 20, 1954 as a station on the Japan National Railways (JNR). It has been unattended since March 19, 1984. With the privatization of the JNR on April 1, 1987, it came under the operational control of JR East.

== Surrounding area ==
- National Route 101

== See also ==
- List of railway stations in Japan
