= Todoroki Station (Aomori) =

Railway station in Fukaura, Aomori Prefecture, Japan

Todoroki Station 驫木駅
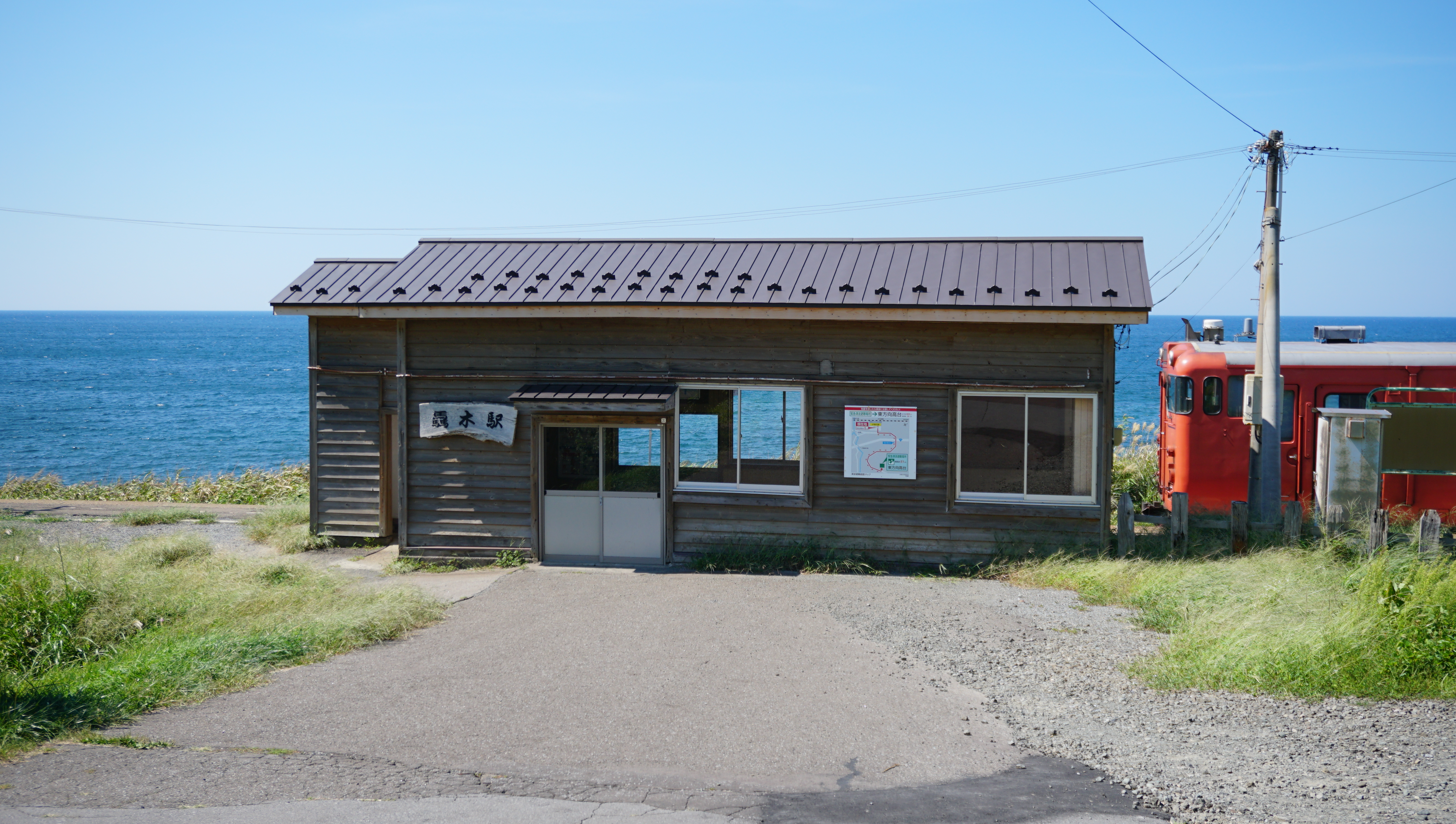
- Todoroki Station in September 2019

General information
- Location: 18 Ogita, Todoroki, Fukaura Town, Nishitsugaru District, Aomori Prefecture 038-2412; Japan
- Coordinates: 40°42′25.84″N 139°58′58.55″E
- Operator: JR East
- Line: Gonō Line
- Distance: 76.0 km (47.2 mi) from Higashi-Noshiro
- Platforms: 1 side platform
- Tracks: 1

Construction
- Structure type: At grade

Other information
- Status: Unstaffed
- Website: Official website (in Japanese)

History
- Opened: 13 December 1934; 91 years ago

Services
Preceding station	JR East	Following station
Oirase towards Higashi-Noshiro	Gonō Line Local	Kasose towards Hirosaki
Location
- Location within Aomori Prefecture Location within Tohoku, Japan Location within Japan

Todoroki Station (驫木駅, Todoroki-eki) is a railway station on the Gonō Line in the town of Fukaura, Aomori Prefecture, Japan, operated by East Japan Railway Company (JR East).

== Lines ==
Todoroki Station is served by the single-track Gonō Line, and lies 76.0 kilometers from the starting point of the line at Higashi-Noshiro. As of March 2015, the station is served by just five services in each direction daily.

== Station layout ==
Todoroki Station has a single side platform, serving bidirectional traffic. The station is unattended. The station building is a wooden structure built onto the platform.

== History ==
The station was opened on December 13, 1934, as a station on the Japanese National Railways (JNR). With the privatization of the JNR on April 1, 1987, it came under the operational control of JR East.

== Surrounding area ==
- National Route 101
- Sea of Japan.

== Gallery ==
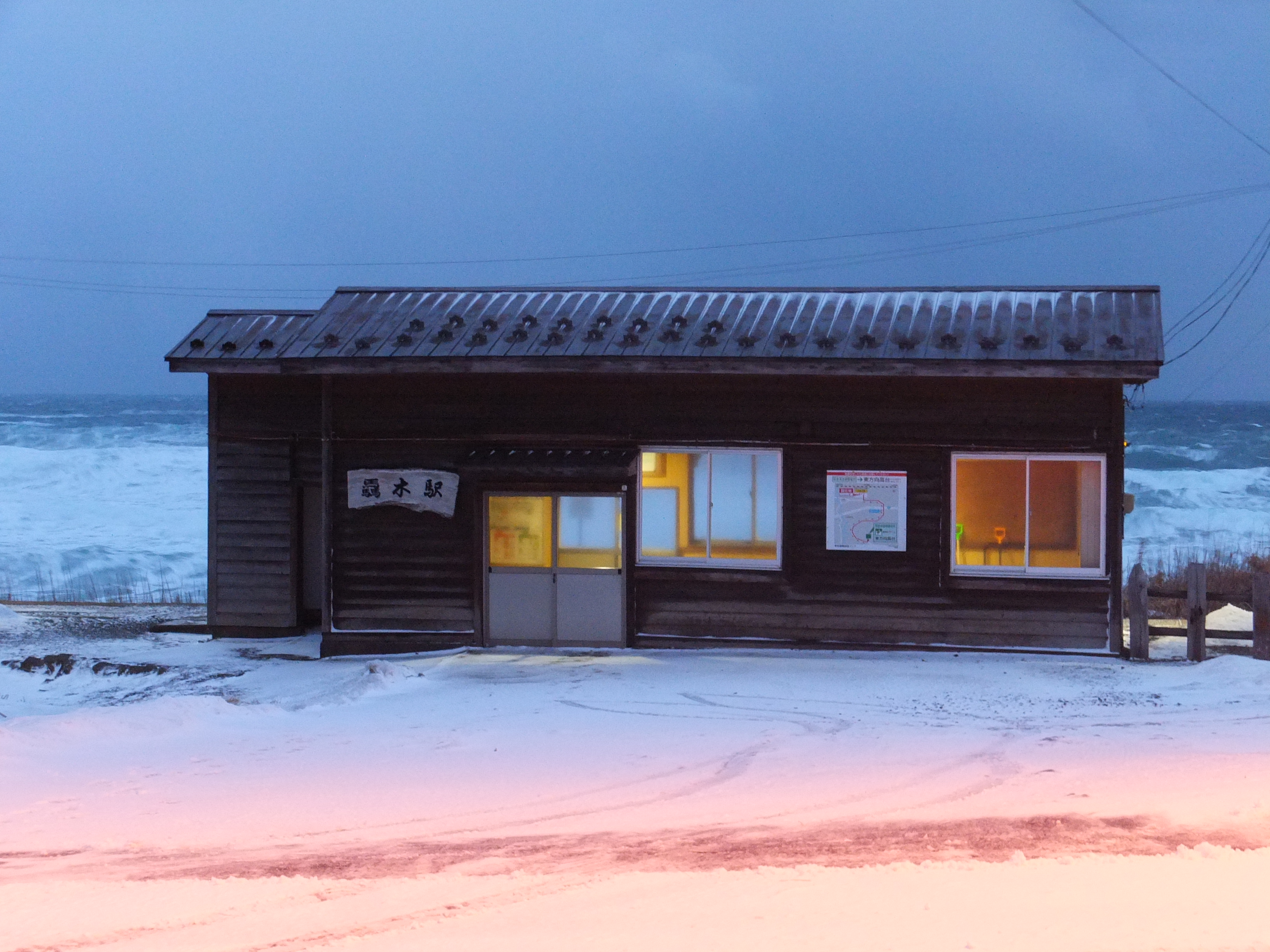
Station building during the winter, February 2018

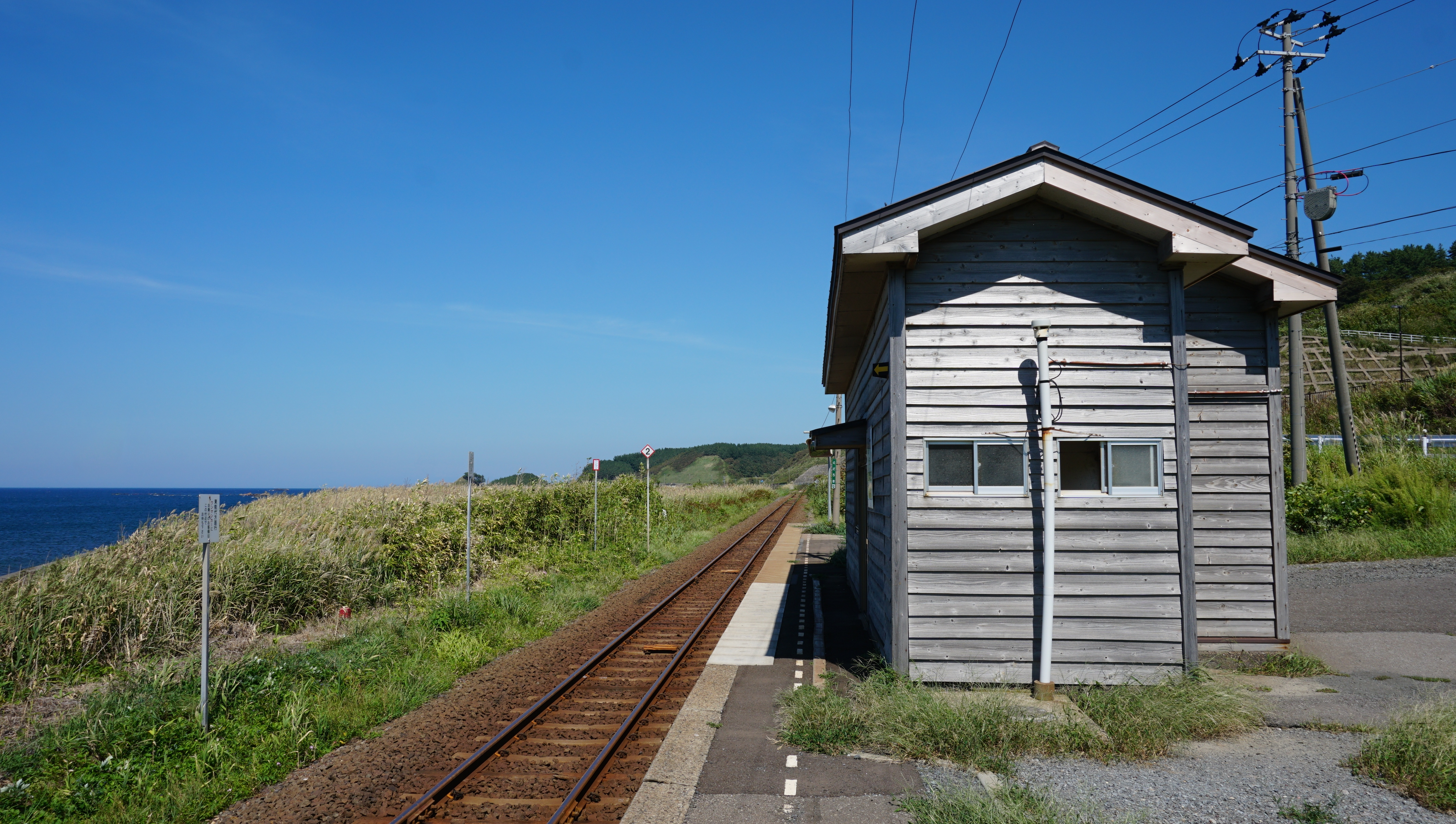
Platform, September 2019

== See also ==
- List of railway stations in Japan
