= Nakata Station =

Railway station in Tsugaru, Aomori Prefecture, Japan

Nakata Station 中田駅
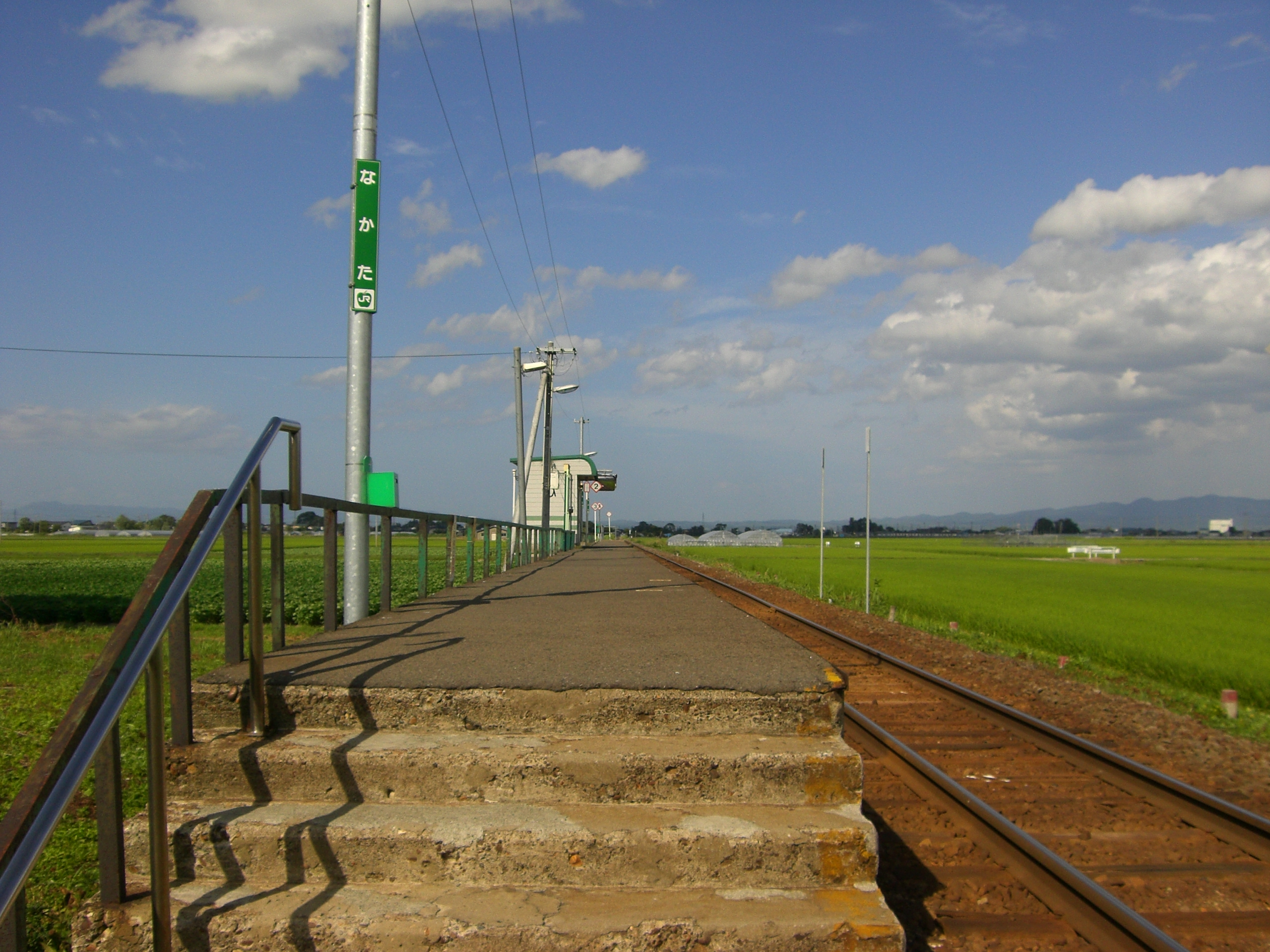
- Nakata Station platform in August 2007

General information
- Location: 13 Nakata-Yonemoto, Morita-chō, Tsugaru City, Aomori Prefecture 038-2814; Japan
- Coordinates: 40°47′14.53″N 140°21′51.86″E
- Operator: JR East
- Line: Gonō Line
- Distance: 116.9 km (72.6 mi) from Higashi-Noshiro
- Platforms: 1 side platform
- Tracks: 1

Construction
- Structure type: At grade

Other information
- Status: Unstaffed
- Website: Official website (in Japanese)

History
- Opened: 11 November 1956; 69 years ago

Services
Preceding station	JR East	Following station
Mutsu-Morita towards Higashi-Noshiro	Gonō Line Rapid	Kizukuri One-way operation
Mutsu-Morita towards Higashi-Noshiro	Gonō Line Local	Kizukuri towards Hirosaki
Location
- Location within Aomori Prefecture Location within Tohoku, Japan Location within Japan

Nakata Station (中田駅, Nakata-eki) is a railway station located in the city of Tsugaru, Aomori Prefecture, Japan, operated by the East Japan Railway Company (JR East).

== Lines ==
Nakata Station is a station on the Gonō Line, and is located 97.4 kilometers from the terminus of the line at Higashi-Noshiro.

== Station layout ==
Nakata Station has one side platform serving a single bi-directional track. There is no station building, only a small weather shelter on the platform. The station is unattended.

== History ==
Nakata Station was opened on November 11, 1956 as a Japanese National Railways station in the former village of Morita, Nishitsugaru District. With the privatization of JNR on April 1, 1987, the station came under the operational control of JR East.

== Surrounding area ==
The station is surrounded by rice fields, and Mount Iwaki is clearly visible from the platform.

- National Route 101

== See also ==
- List of railway stations in Japan
