= Oirase Station =

Railway station in Fukaura, Aomori Prefecture, Japan

Oirase Station 追良瀬駅
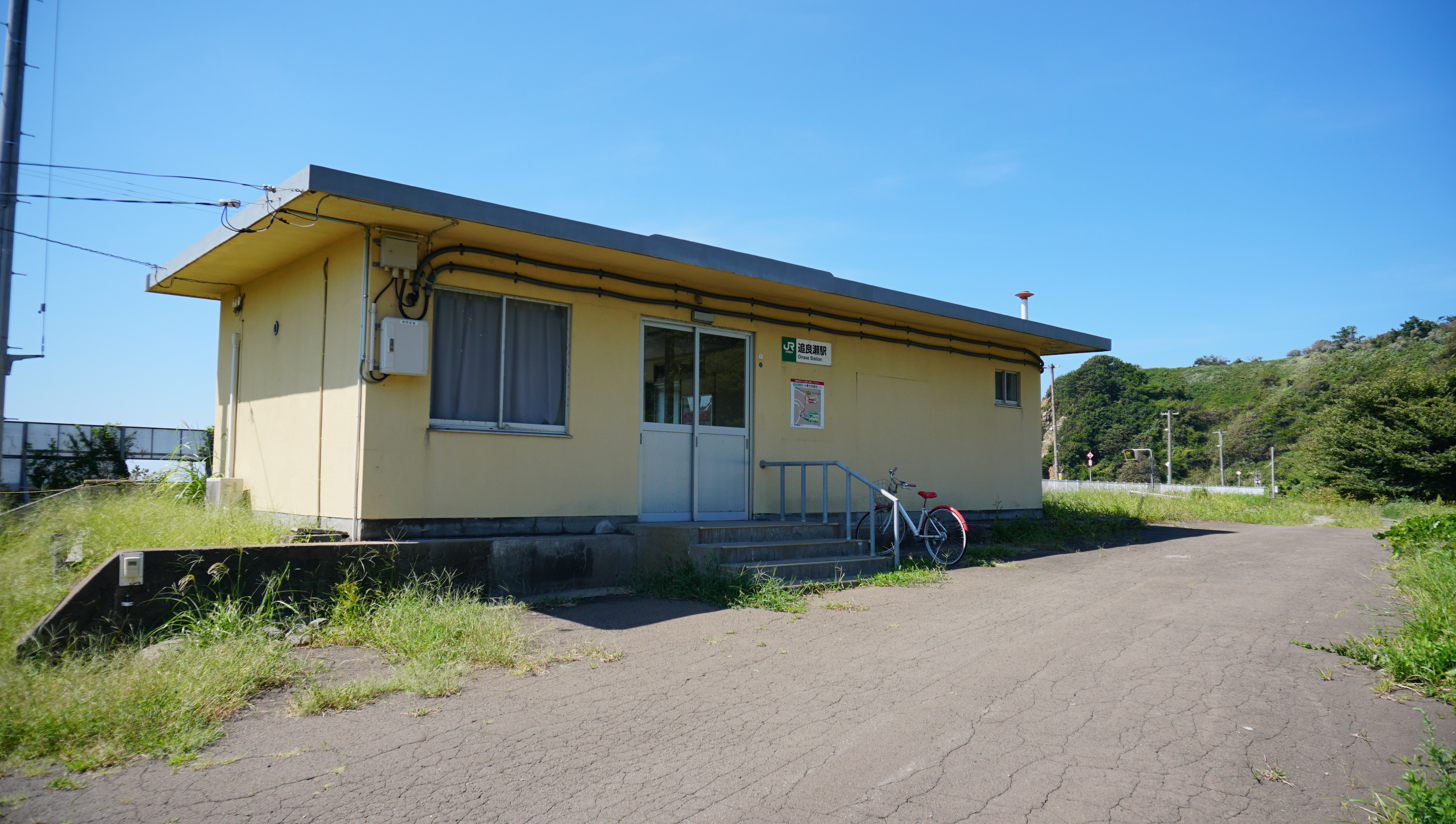
- Oirase Station in September 2019

General information
- Location: 32 Oirase Shiomizaki, Fukaura Town, Nishitsugaru District, Aomori Prefecture 038-2413; Japan
- Coordinates: 40°41′9.73″N 139°58′13.66″E
- Operator: JR East
- Line: Gonō Line
- Distance: 72.9 km (45.3 mi) from Higashi-Noshiro
- Platforms: 1 side platform
- Tracks: 1

Construction
- Structure type: At grade

Other information
- Status: Unstaffed
- Website: Official website (in Japanese)

History
- Opened: 13 December 1934; 91 years ago

Services
Preceding station	JR East	Following station
Hiroto towards Higashi-Noshiro	Gonō Line Local	Todoroki towards Hirosaki
Location
- Location within Aomori Prefecture Location within Tohoku, Japan Location within Japan

Oirase Station (追良瀬駅, Oirase-eki) is a railway station located in the town of Fukaura, Aomori Prefecture, Japan, operated by the East Japan Railway Company (JR East).

== Lines ==
Oirase Station is a station on the Gonō Line, and is located 72.9 kilometers from the terminus of the line at Higashi-Noshiro.

== Station layout ==
Oirase Station has one ground-level island platform, of which one side is in use, serving a single bi-directional track. The station is unattended, and is managed from Goshogawara Station. There is a small weather shelter on the platform but no station building.

== History ==
Oirase Station was opened on December 13, 1934 as a station on the Japan National Railways (JNR). With the privatization of the JNR on April 1, 1987, it came under the operational control of JR East.

== Surrounding area ==
- National Route 101

== See also ==
- List of railway stations in Japan
