= Ōdose Station =

Railway station in Fukaura, Aomori Prefecture, Japan

Ōdose Station 大戸瀬駅
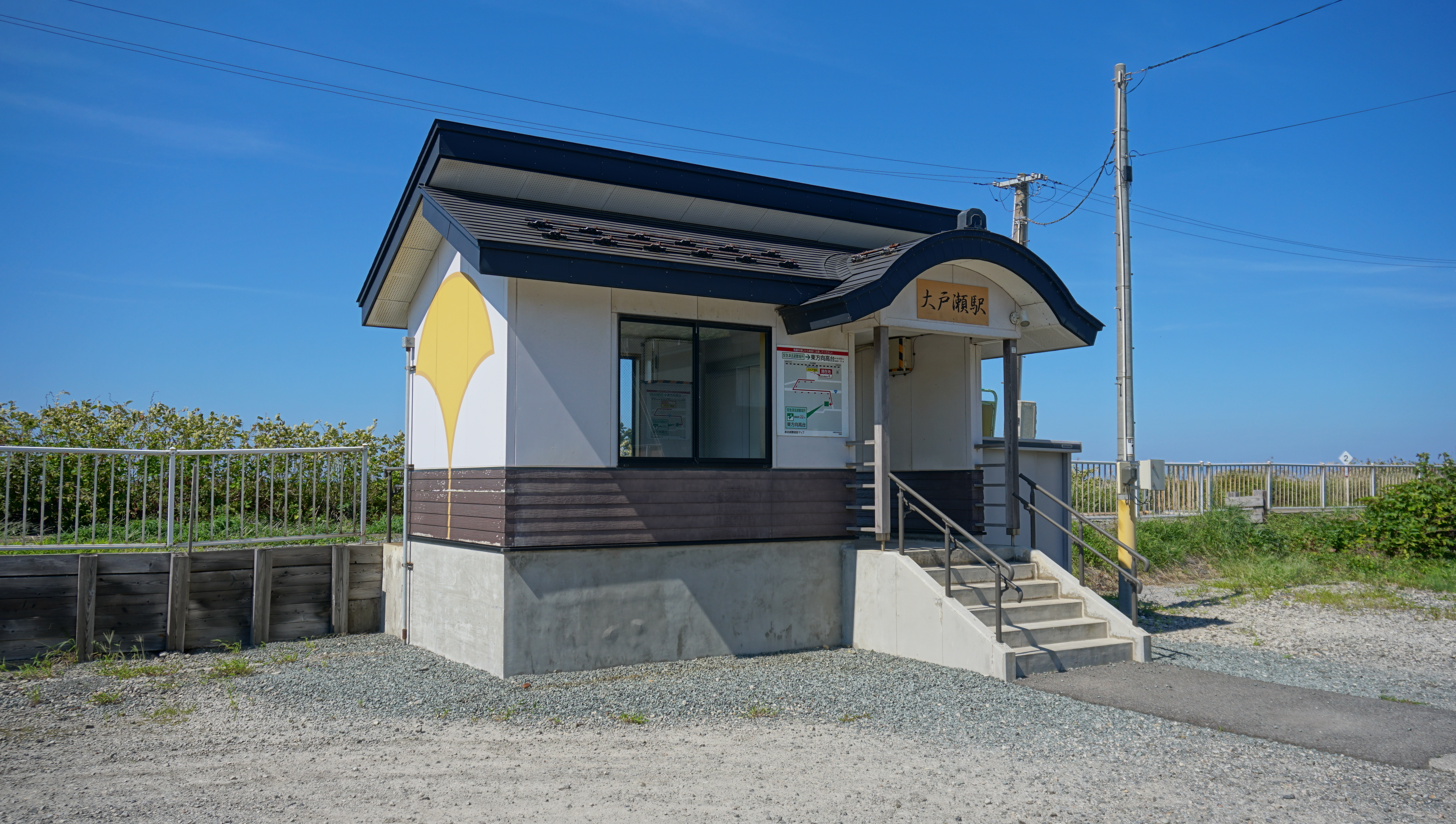
- Ōdose Station in September 2019

General information
- Location: Tanozawa, Fukaura-machi, Nishitsugaru-gun, Aomori 038-2505; Japan
- Coordinates: 40°45′33.17″N 140°02′00.45″E
- Operator: JR East
- Line: ■ Gonō Line
- Distance: 83.9 km from Higashi-Noshiro
- Platforms: 1 side platform

Other information
- Status: Unstaffed
- Website: Official website (in Japanese)

History
- Opened: November 5, 1953

Services
Preceding station	JR East	Following station
Kasose towards Higashi-Noshiro	Gonō Line Local	Senjōjiki towards Hirosaki
Location
- Location within Japan

Ōdose Station (大戸瀬駅, Ōdose-eki) is a railway station located in the town of Fukaura, Aomori Prefecture, Japan, operated by the East Japan Railway Company (JR East).

== Lines ==
Ōdose Station is a station on the Gonō Line, and is located 83.9 kilometers from the terminus of the line at Higashi-Noshiro.

== Station layout ==
Ōdose Station has one ground-level side platform serving a single bi-directional track. The station was built with dual opposed side platforms, but only the former southbound platform is now used. The station is unattended and is managed from Goshogawara Station. There is no station building.

== History ==
Ōdose Station was opened on November 5, 1933, as a station on the Japan National Railways (JNR). It has been unattended since March 19, 1984. With the privatization of the JNR on April 1, 1987, it came under the operational control of JR East. The station has been unattended since May 1, 2002.

== Surrounding area ==
- National Route 101

== See also ==
- List of railway stations in Japan
