= Kashiwa, Aomori =

Kashiwa 柏村
- Former municipality
- Flag Emblem

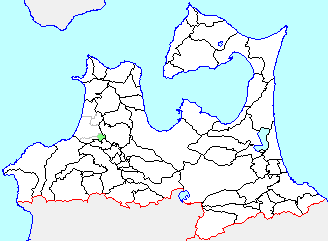
- Location of Kashiwa in Aomori Prefecture

- Location in Japan
- Coordinates: 40°47′6.5″N 140°24′38.1″E
- Country: Japan
- Region: Tōhoku
- Prefecture: Aomori Prefecture
- District: Nishitsugaru
- Merged: 11 February 2005 (now part of Tsugaru)

Area
  - Total: 14.32 km^{2} (5.53 sq mi)

Population (1 February 2005)
  - Total: 5,158
  - Density: 360.2/km^{2} (933/sq mi)
- Time zone: UTC+09:00 (JST)

Kashiwa (柏村, Kashiwa-mura) was a village located in Nishitsugaru District in western Aomori Prefecture, Japan.

Kashiwa Village was located in the central portion of Tsugaru Peninsula. The area was part of Hirosaki Domain during the Edo period. After the Meiji Restoration, Kashiwa Village was created on 1 April 1889.

On 11 February 2005, Kashiwa, along with the town of Kizukuri, and the villages of Inagaki, Morita and Shariki (all from Nishitsugaru District), was merged to create the city of Tsugaru, and thus no longer exists as an independent municipality.

At the time of its merger, Kashiwa had an estimated population of 5,158 and a density of 360.2 persons per km^{2}. The total area was 14.32 km^{2}. The village economy was dominated by agriculture.
