= Kizukuri Station =

Railway station in Tsugaru, Aomori Prefecture, Japan

Kizukuri Station 木造駅
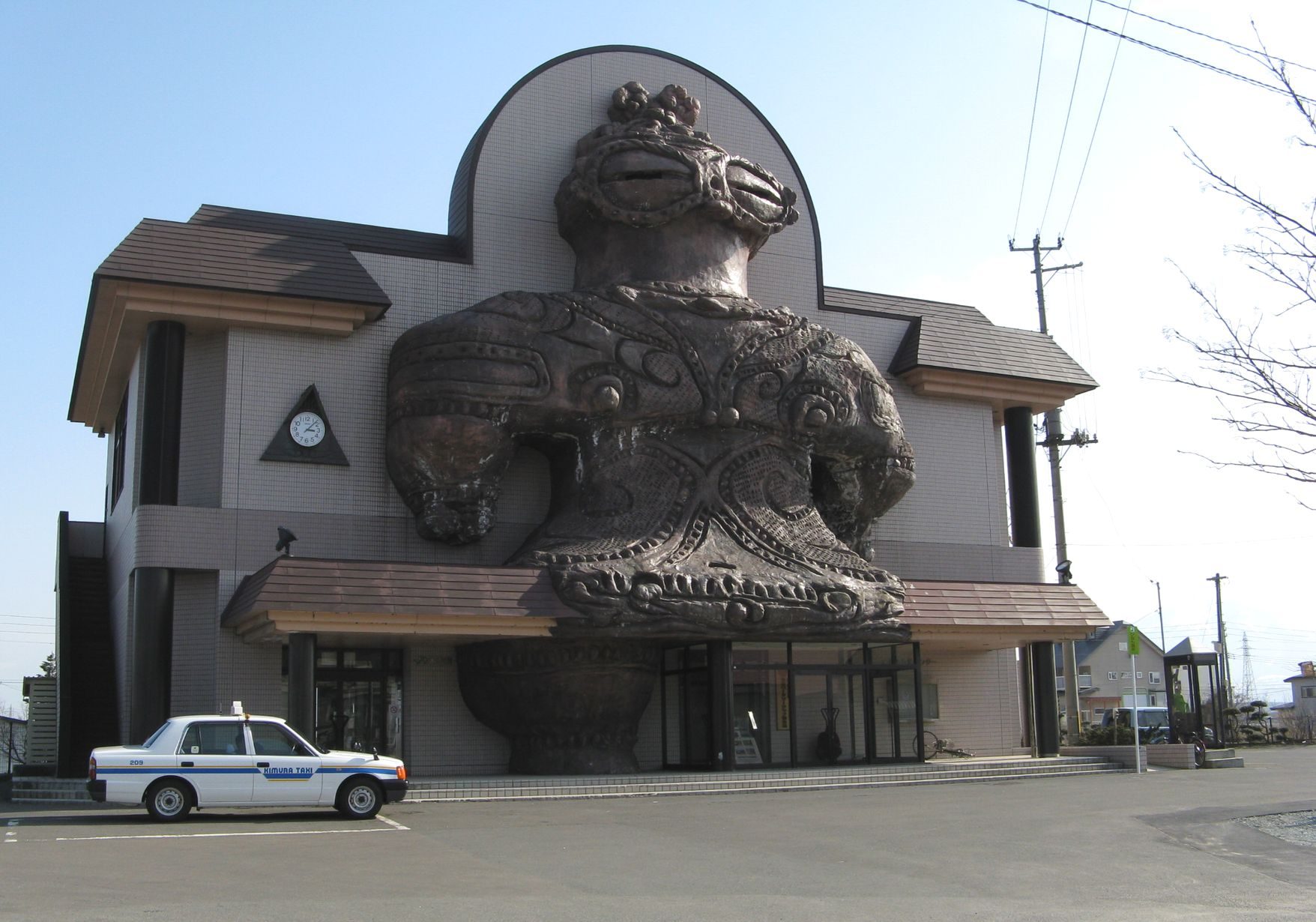
- Kizukuri Station in April 2008

General information
- Location: 10 Kizukuri Fusamatsu, Tsugaru City, Aomori Prefecture 038-3158; Japan
- Coordinates: 40°48′08.89″N 140°23′17.20″E
- Operator: JR East
- Line: Gonō Line
- Distance: 119.5 km (74.3 mi) from Higashi-Noshiro
- Platforms: 1 side platform
- Tracks: 1

Construction
- Structure type: At grade

Other information
- Status: Staffed
- Website: Official website (in Japanese)

History
- Opened: 21 October 1924; 101 years ago

Passengers
- FY2021: 167 (Daily)

Services
Preceding station	JR East	Following station
Nakata towards Higashi-Noshiro	Gonō Line Rapid	Goshogawara One-way operation
Nakata towards Higashi-Noshiro	Gonō Line Local	Goshogawara towards Hirosaki
Location
- Location within Aomori Prefecture Location within Tohoku, Japan Location within Japan

Kizukuri Station (木造駅, Kizukuri-eki) is a railway station located in the city of Tsugaru, Aomori Prefecture, Japan, operated by the East Japan Railway Company (JR East). The station is a kan'i itaku station, administered by Goshogawara Station, and operated by Tsugaru municipal authority, with point-of-sales terminal installed. Ordinary tickets, express tickets, and reserved-seat tickets for all JR lines are on sale (no connecting tickets).

== Lines ==
Kizukuri Station is served by the Gonō Line. It is 119.5 rail kilometers from the terminus of the line at Higashi-Noshiro.

== Station layout ==
Kizukuri Station has one ground-level side platform serving a single bi-directional track. The station building is attended during normal daylight operating hours.

== History ==
Kizukuri Station was opened on October 21, 1924 as a station on the Mutsu Railway in former Kizukuri Town, and became a station on the Japanese Government Railways (JGR) when the Mutsu Railway was nationalized on June 1, 1927. With the privatization of the Japanese National Railways (successor of JGR) on April 1, 1987, it came under the operational control of JR East. The current station building, decorated with a huge shakōkidogū statue on its facade, was completed in 1992.

== Passenger statistics ==
In fiscal 2016, the station was used by an average of 212 passengers daily (boarding passengers only).

== Surrounding area ==
- National Route 101
- Tsugaru Police station
- Kizukuri Post Office
- Tsugaru City Hall

== See also ==
- List of railway stations in Japan

== Gallery ==
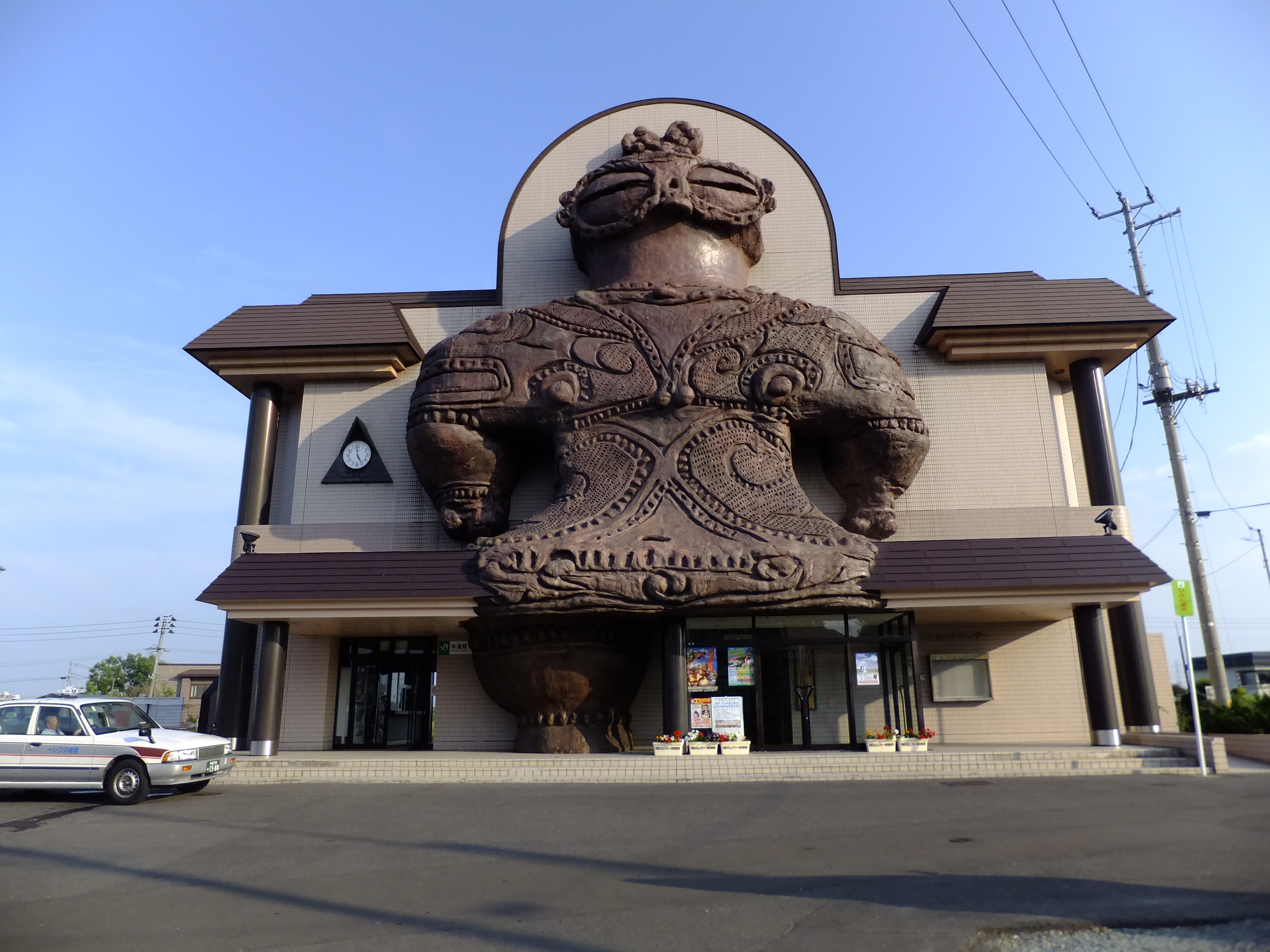
Station structure, August 2012
