= Tagoyano Shell Mound =

Archaeological site in Tsugaru, Tohoku, Japan

Tagoyano Shell Midden
- 田小屋野貝塚 (Japanese)
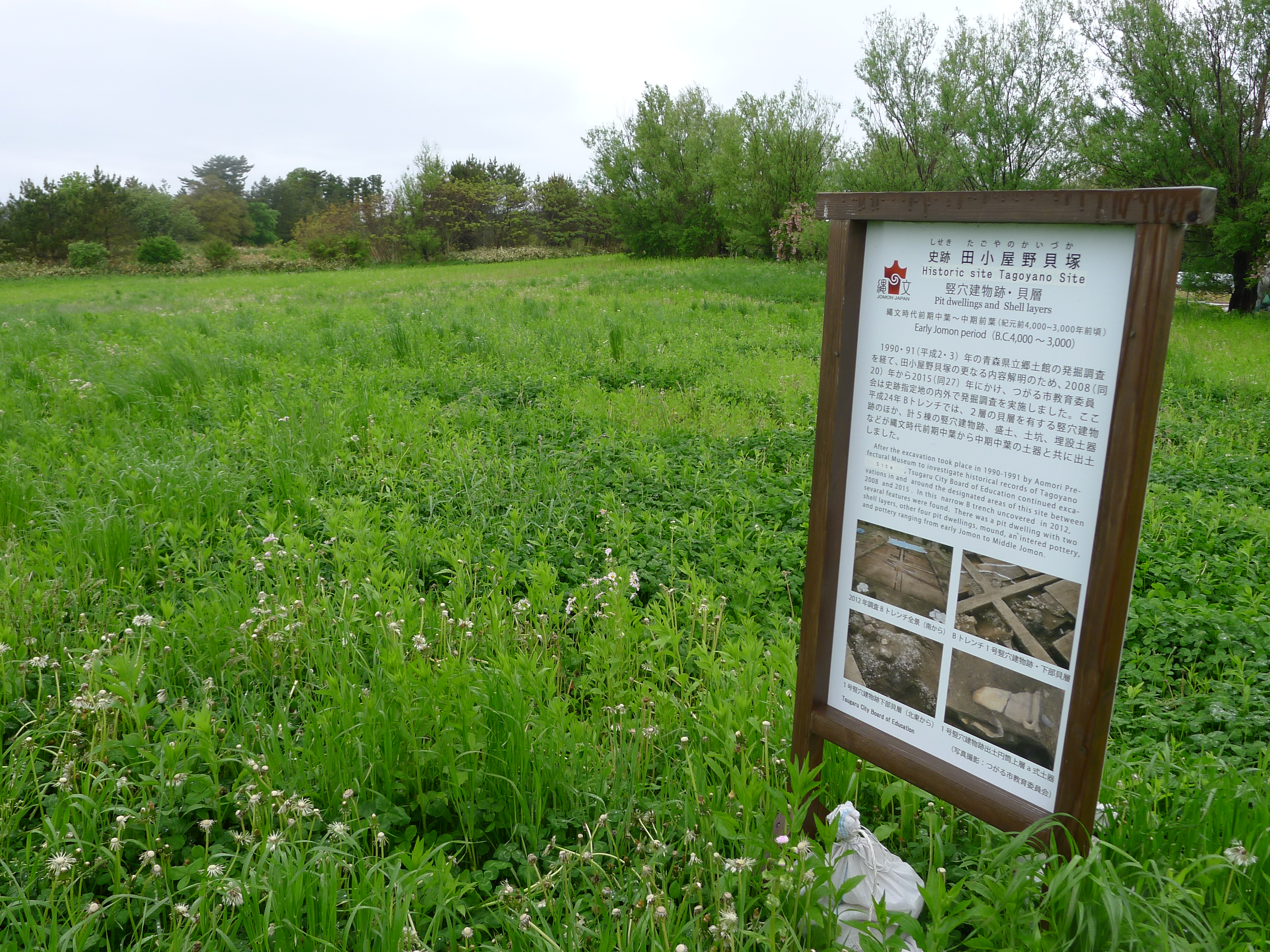
- A sign at the site

- Tagoyano Shell Midden Tagoyano Shell Mound (Japan)
- 40°53′17″N 140°20′21″E
- Type: shell midden
- Periods: Jōmon period
- Location: Tsugaru, Aomori, Japan
- Region: Tōhoku region

History
- Built: 4500 - 2500 BC

Site notes
- Height: 15 metres (49 ft)
- Area: 20,076.84 square metres (4.96110 acres)
- Excavation dates: 1990-1991
- Public access: Yes (no facilities at site)

The Tagoyano Shell Midden (田小屋野貝塚, Tagoyano kaizuka) is an archaeological site in what is now the city of Tsugaru, Aomori Prefecture, in the Tōhoku region of northern Japan with an early Jōmon period shell midden. The site was designated a National Historic Site in 1944 by the Japanese government. It is a rare example of a shell midden to be found near the coast of the Sea of Japan.

== Overview ==
During the early to middle Jōmon period (approximately 4000 to 2500 BC), sea levels were five to six meters higher than at present, and the ambient temperature was also 2 deg C higher. During this period, the Tōhoku region was inhabited by the Jōmon people, many of whom lived in coastal settlements. The middens associated with such settlements contain bone, botanical material, mollusc shells, sherds, lithics, and other artifacts and ecofacts associated with the now-vanished inhabitants, and these features, provide a useful source into the diets and habits of Jōmon society. Most of these middens are found along the Pacific coast of Japan; however, this side is located on a fluvial terrace on the left bank of the Iwaki River, on the southeastern tip of the tongue-shaped plateau with an elevation of 10 to 15 meters jutting out to the Tsugaru Plain, facing the Sea of Japan.

Cylindrical pottery found at the site dates it to 4,500-6,000 years ago which corresponds to early to middle Jōmon period. Around this time, the surrounding area was submerged by the expanding brackish water of ancient Lake Jūsan due to a rise in sea levels. The midden is almost exclusively made of Yamato-shijimi clams which were harvested from the brackish water; however, other shells, as well as the bones of fish including carp and Japanese sea bass and the bones of birds such as geese, ducks and short-tailed albatrosses have been unearthed. In addition, bone implements made of the bones of large mammals such as whales and dolphins as well as human bones have also been unearthed at the site.

During excavation conducted by the Aomori Prefectural Museum from 1990 to 1991, the remains of pit dwellings, and more than 50 unfinished bracelets made of Benkeigai (Giycymeris albolineatus) clamshells were discovered, demonstrating that bracelets were made in the settlement. Such bracelets dating from the same period have also been found in Hokkaidō, and obsidian from Hokkaidō has been discovered at this site, indicating that production activities and trading across the Tsugaru Strait occurred during the Jōmon period.

The site has been submitted for inscription on the UNESCO World Heritage List as one of the Jōmon Archaeological Sites in Hokkaidō, Northern Tōhoku, and other regions

There are no public facilities at the site, which has been backfilled and is now located under rice paddies. There is only a billboard with some explanatory text and photographs.

== See also ==
- List of Historic Sites of Japan (Aomori)
