= Tsugaru, Aomori =

Tsugaru つがる市
- City
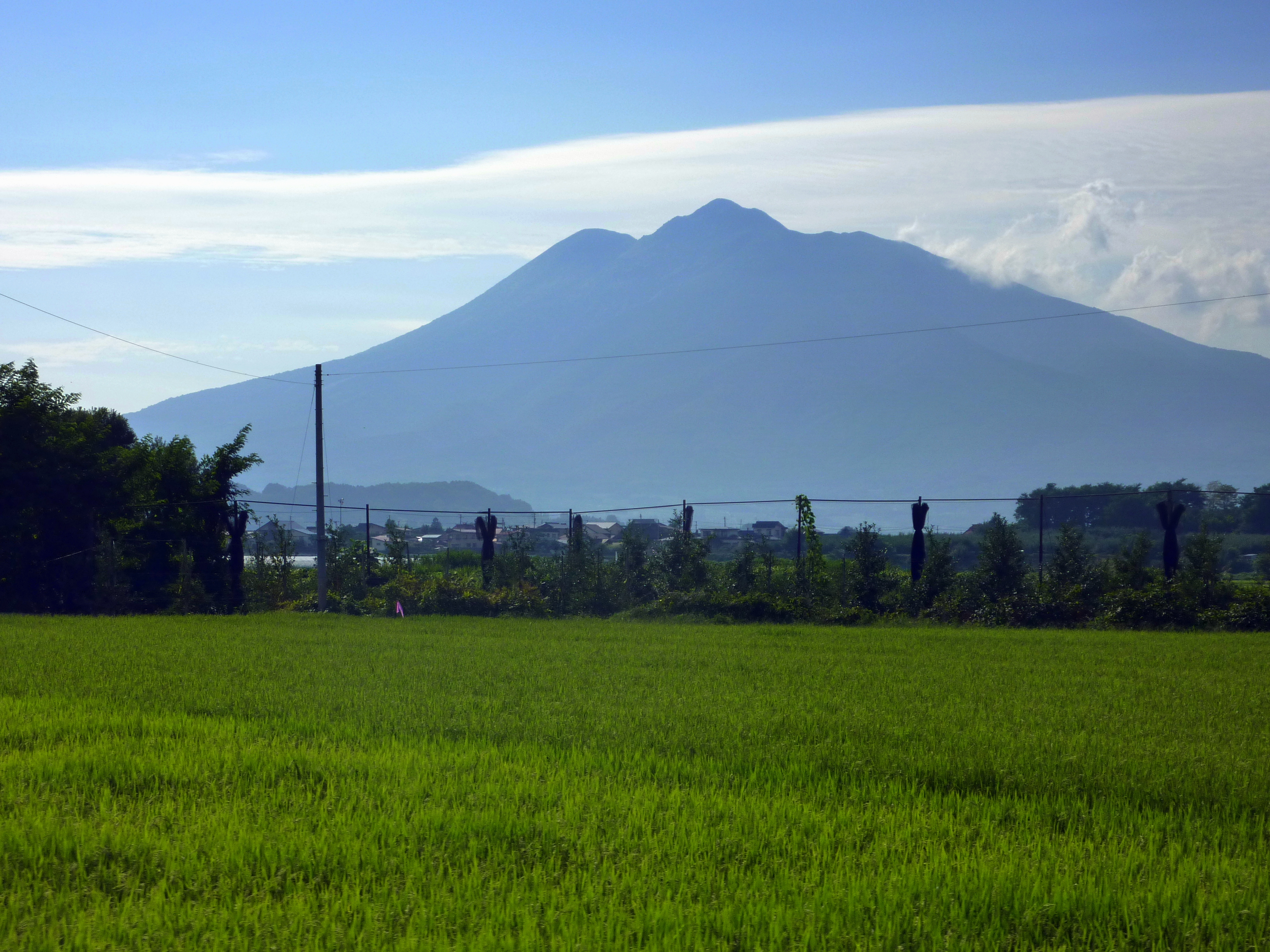
- Mount Iwaki stands prominently to the southwest of Tsugaru

- Flag Seal
- Location of Tsugaru in Aomori Prefecture

- Coordinates: 40°48′31.4″N 140°22′48.2″E
- Country: Japan
- Region: Tōhoku
- Prefecture: Aomori

Area
  - Total: 253.55 km^{2} (97.90 sq mi)

Population (January 31, 2023)
  - Total: 30,128
  - Density: 118.82/km^{2} (307.75/sq mi)
- Time zone: UTC+9 (Japan Standard Time)
- Phone number: 0173-42-2111
- Address: 61-1 Kizukuri Wakamidori, Tsugaru-shi, Aomori-ken 038-3192
- Website: Official website
- Symbols
- Bird: Common cuckoo
- Flower: Nikkōkisuge (Hemerocallis dumortieri var. esculenta)
- Tree: Japanese black pine

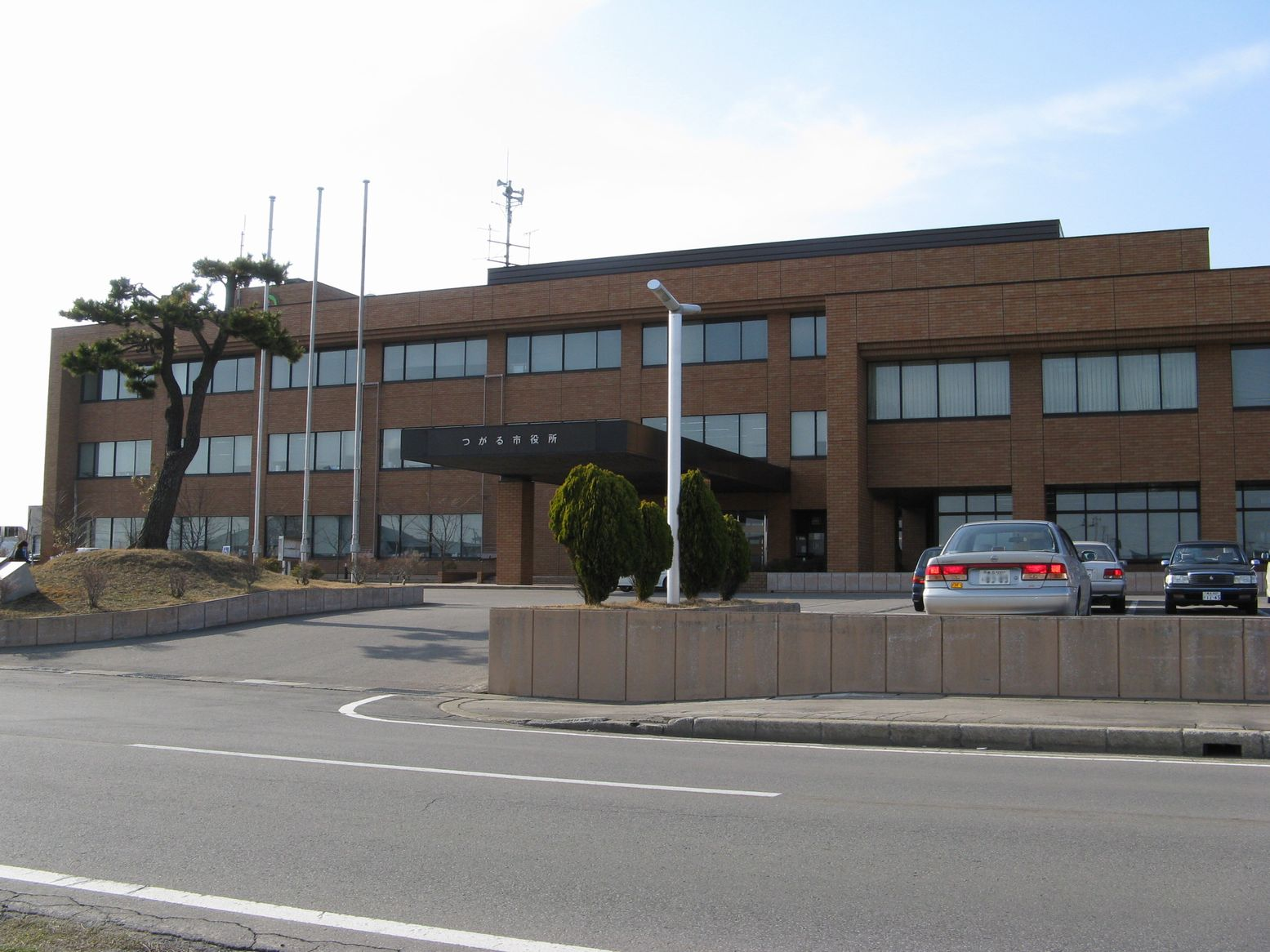
Tsugaru City Hall

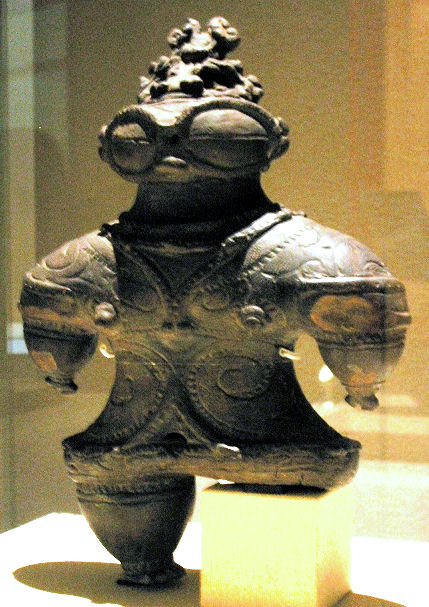
Jōmon period Dogū statue found in Tsugaru

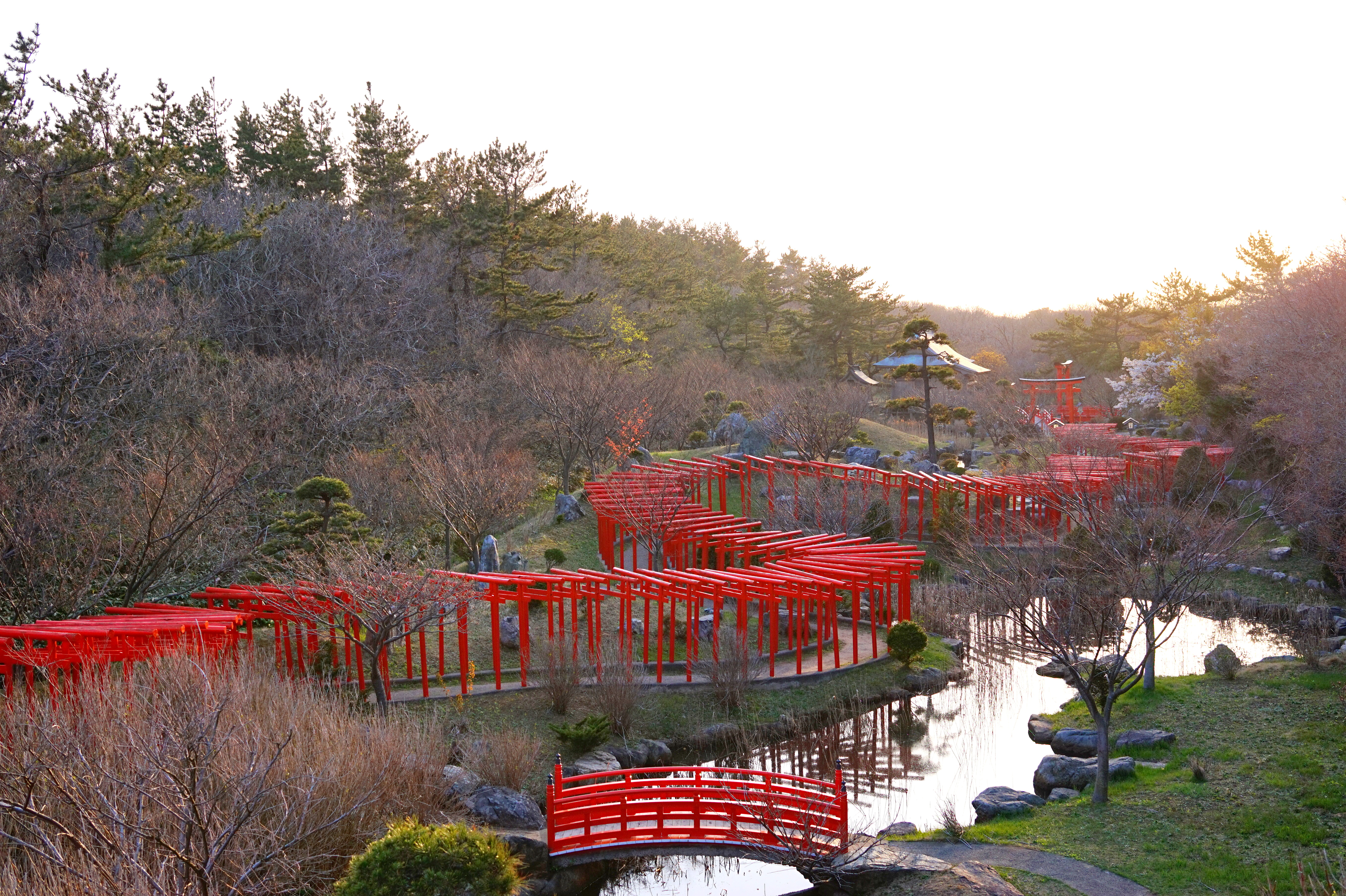
Takayama Inari Shrine

Tsugaru (つがる市, Tsugaru-shi) is a city located in Aomori Prefecture, Japan. As of 31 January 2023, the city had an estimated population of 30,128 in 13487 households, and a population density of 120 persons per km^{2}. The total area of the city is 253.55 square kilometres (97.90 sq mi). The city's name is atypical for a Japanese place, in that it is written in hiragana rather than kanji (see hiragana cities). Tsugaru is notably featured in Osamu Dazai's 1944 novel "Return to Tsugaru".

== Geography ==
Tsugaru is located on the west coast of Tsugaru Peninsula, facing the Sea of Japan. The Iwaki River flows through the city. Parts of the city are within the borders of Tsugaru Quasi-National Park.

=== Neighbouring municipalities ===
Aomori Prefecture

- Ajigasawa
- Goshogawara
- Hirosaki
- Nakadomari
- Tsuruta

=== Climate ===
The city has a cold humid continental climate (Köppen Dfb) characterized by warm short summers and long cold winters with heavy snowfall. The average annual temperature in Tsugaru is 10.6 °C. The average annual rainfall is 1298 mm with September as the wettest month. The temperatures are highest on average in August, at around 23.9 °C, and lowest in January, at around -1.3 °C.

== Demographics ==
Per Japanese census data, the population of Tsugaru has decreased steadily over the past 60 years.

Historical population
Year	Pop.	±% p.a.
1960	57,965	—
1970	50,785	−1.31%
1980	46,869	−0.80%
1990	43,699	−0.70%
2000	41,320	−0.56%
2010	37,243	−1.03%
2020	30,934	−1.84%

== History ==
The area of Tsugaru was part of the holdings of the Tsugaru clan of Hirosaki Domain in the Edo period. After the Meiji restoration, the area was organised into Nishitsugaru District, Aomori. With the post-Meiji restoration establishment of the modern municipalities system on April 1, 1889, the area became part of Nishitsugaru District, Aomori on April 1, 1889. The village of Kizukuri was raised to town status on May 1, 1901. Kizukuri expanded by merging with the neighboring villages of Koshimizu, Shibata, Kawayoke, Shussei, Tateoka and part of Narusawa on March 30, 1955.

The city of Tsugaru was established on February 11, 2005, from the merger of the town of Kizukuri, and the villages of Inagaki, Kashiwa, Morita and Shariki (all from Nishitsugaru District).

== Government ==
Tsugaru has a mayor-council form of government with a directly elected mayor and a unicameral city legislature of 20 members. Tsugaru contributes one member to the Aomori Prefectural Assembly. In terms of national politics, the city is part of Aomori 3rd district of the lower house of the Diet of Japan.

== Economy ==
The economy of Tsugaru is heavily dependent on agriculture and commercial fishing. The city serves as a minor regional commercial center. Agricultural produce includes rice, apples, melons, watermelons, and Brasenia.

== Education ==
Tsugaru has seven public elementary schools and five public junior high schools which is operated by the city government, and one public high school operated by the Aomori Prefectural Board of Education. The prefecture also operates one special education school for the handicapped.

== Transport ==
=== Railway ===
East Japan Railway Company (JR East) - Gonō Line

- Kizukuri - Nakata - Mutsu-Morita - Koshimizu

=== Highway ===
- Tsugaru Expressway
- National Route 101

== Local attractions ==
- Kamegaoka Stone Age Site, a National Historic Site
- Lake Jūsan
- Tagoyano Shell Mound, a National Historic Site
- Takayama Inari Shrine

== Sister cities ==
- Bath, Maine, United States – friendship city since 2006
- Kashiwa, Chiba, Japan – since 1994
- Shiraoi, Hokkaido, Japan – since 2005

== Noted people from Tsugaru ==
- Nitta Hachirō, singer of popular and classical music
- Osamu Dazai, author
- Rio Matsumoto, actress
- Shunkichi Takeuchi, politician, former Aomori governor
- Gento Uehara, songwriter
- Kenroku Uehara, songwriter

The town has produced many top sumo wrestlers over the years. Among them are:

- Wakanohana Kanji I, yokozuna
- Asahifuji Seiya, yokozuna
- Wakanosato Shinobu, sekiwake
- Takanosato Toshihide, yokozuna

== See also ==
- Folklore of the Tsugaru region
