= Newport Lifeboat Station =

Former RNLI lifeboat station in Pembrokeshire, Wales

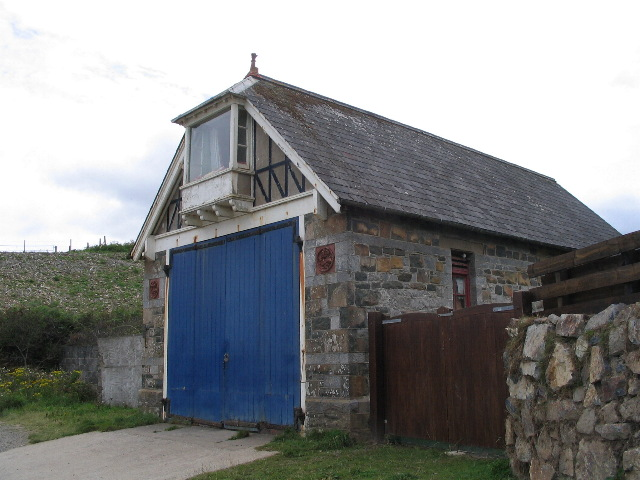
- Former lifeboat house, Newport

- Cwm Dewi, Pembrokeshire

General information
- Status: Closed
- Type: RNLI Lifeboat Station
- Location: Cwm Dewi, Parrog, Newport, Pembrokeshire,, Wales
- Coordinates: 52°01′17.7″N 4°51′03.2″W
- Opened: 27 May 1884
- Closed: 1894

Newport Lifeboat Station was located at Cwm Dewi, a cove in Parrog, a district of the town of Newport, sitting at the mouth of the River Nevern, approximately 7 miles (11 km) east of Fishguard, in Pembrokeshire, South Wales.

A lifeboat station was established at Newport, Pembrokeshire in 1884, by the Royal National Lifeboat Institution (RNLI).

After operating for just 10 years, Newport Lifeboat Station closed in 1894.

== History ==
Since its founding in 1824, the Royal National Institution for the Preservation of Life from Shipwreck (RNIPLS), later to become the RNLI in 1854, has awarded medals for deeds of gallantry at sea.

In gale-force conditions on 17 March 1863, the sloop Frances sank on the Newport sands. Led by Thomas Rowlands and coastguard George Lewis, six other men waded out into the surf, and rescued the crew of three. Master mariner Thomas Rowlands, and commissioned boatman George Lewis of H.M. Coastguard, Goodick were each awarded the RNLI Silver Medal.

On 27 May 1884, the streets of Newport in Pembrokeshire were draped in flags, and a large crowd had assembled. The occasion was the inauguration of the new lifeboat station. A new 37-foot self-righting 'Pulling and Sailing' (P&S) lifeboat, one with (12) oars and sails, which had already been fully tested on the Limehouse canal in London by the manufacturers, had been transported to the town, and was about to be taken in procession to the new lifeboat house, at the cove at Cwm Dewi.

The cost of the lifeboat and the equipment had been defrayed by a sum of £500 received from the Clevedon Lifeboat Fund, raised by Mrs. E. Lavington and pupils of Belgrave House, Clevedon, a school offering "high-class education for daughters of gentlemen". It had originally been intended that the fund would provide a lifeboat for the town of Clevedon, in Somerset, but on investigation, the Institution had found the location unsuitable.

The procession, starting at the cross in Newport, included members of the Foresters, Ivorites, Odd Fellows, the mayor, the Rev. James Jenkins, the Newport Brass Band, the lifeboat on its carriage, and the lifeboat crew, in blue jerseys and red caps. Setting out first for Llwyngwair to collect James B. Bowen, president of the Newport RNLI branch, and his daughter, Miss Bowen, the procession then headed to the new lifeboat house, which had been constructed at a cost of £404-8s-6d. Following a service of dedication, the lifeboat was named Clevedon (ON 61) by Miss Bowen, after which, it was launched for a demonstration to the assembled crowd, accompanied by the Fishguard lifeboat, which had been rowed over to join the celebration.

Only two services can be found in the RNLI journal 'The Lifeboat'.

On 17 August 1887, on the occasion of the Newport Regatta, eight members of the regatta committee were stationed on board a barge at anchor 300 yards (270 m) off the beach. When a strong N.N.E. wind blew up, the barge became unsettled, and with no oars or sails, signals of distress were hoisted. The lifeboat soon had all eight people off the barge, which sank shortly afterwards.

The Clevedon was launched at 03:00 on 8 October 1889, into a strong W.N.W gale, to the aid of the brigantine Reliance of Wexford, on passage to Newport, Monmouthshire. The vessel had lost her masts in a gale two days earlier, and the mate had been washed overboard. The remaining three crew were recovered to the lifeboat, which was then forced to head for Cardigan due to the severe weather, only able to return home the following day at 20:00.

The report of the deputy Chief Inspector of Life-boats was read at the meeting of the RNLI committee of management on 8 November 1894. Later in the minutes of the same meeting, came just a one line entry. "Also to abolish the present Life-boat Station at Newport (Pembrokeshire)."

Newport Lifeboat Station closed in 1894. The boathouse remains, and is now a private residence. The lifeboat on station at the time of closure, Clevedon (ON 61), was sold from service in January 1895.

== Station honours ==
The following are awards made at Newport.

- RNLI Silver Medal

Thomas Rowlands, Master Mariner – 1863
George Lewis, Commissioned Boatman, H.M. Coastguard, Goodick – 1863

== Newport lifeboat ==
ON (Note: ON is the RNLI's Official Number of the boat.)	Name	Built	On station	Class	Comments
61	Clevedon	1884	1884–1894	37-foot Self-righting (P&S)	(Note: 37-foot x 8-foot (12-oared) self-righting (P&S) lifeboat, gift of Clevedon LB Fund, via Mrs E. Lavington, built by Forrestt of Limehouse, London, costing £340.)

== See also ==
- List of RNLI stations
- List of former RNLI stations
- Royal National Lifeboat Institution lifeboats
