= Inagaki, Aomori =

Inagaki 稲垣村
- Former municipality
- Flag Emblem

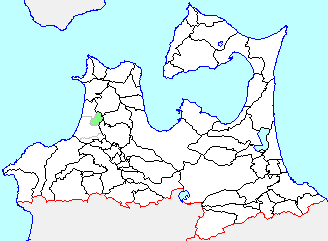
- Location of Inagaki in Aomori Prefecture

- Location in Japan
- Coordinates: 40°52′39.5″N 140°23′38.6″E
- Country: Japan
- Region: Tōhoku
- Prefecture: Aomori Prefecture
- District: Nishitsugaru
- Merged: 11 February 2005 (now part of Tsugaru)

Area
  - Total: 33.17 km^{2} (12.81 sq mi)

Population (1 February 2005)
  - Total: 4,846
  - Density: 146.1/km^{2} (378/sq mi)
- Time zone: UTC+09:00 (JST)
- Symbols
- Bird: Oriental greenfinch
- Flower: Iris
- Tree: Manchurian ash

Inagaki (Japanese: 稲垣村, Hepburn: Inagaki-mura) was a village located in Nishitsugaru District in western Aomori Prefecture, Japan.

Inagaki Village was located in central of Tsugaru Peninsula. The area was part of Hirosaki Domain during the Edo period. After the Meiji Restoration, Inagaki Village was created on 1 April 1889.

On 11 February 2005, Inagaki, along with the town of Kizukuri, and the villages of Kashiwa, Morita and Shariki (all from Nishitsugaru District), was merged to create the city of Tsugaru, and thus no longer exists as an independent municipality.

At the time of its merger, Inagaki had an estimated population of 4,846 and a population density of 146.1 persons per km^{2}. The total area was 33.17 km^{2}. The village economy was dominated by agriculture.
