= Mutsu-Morita Station =

Railway station in Tsugaru, Aomori Prefecture, Japan

Mutsu-Morita Station 陸奥森田駅
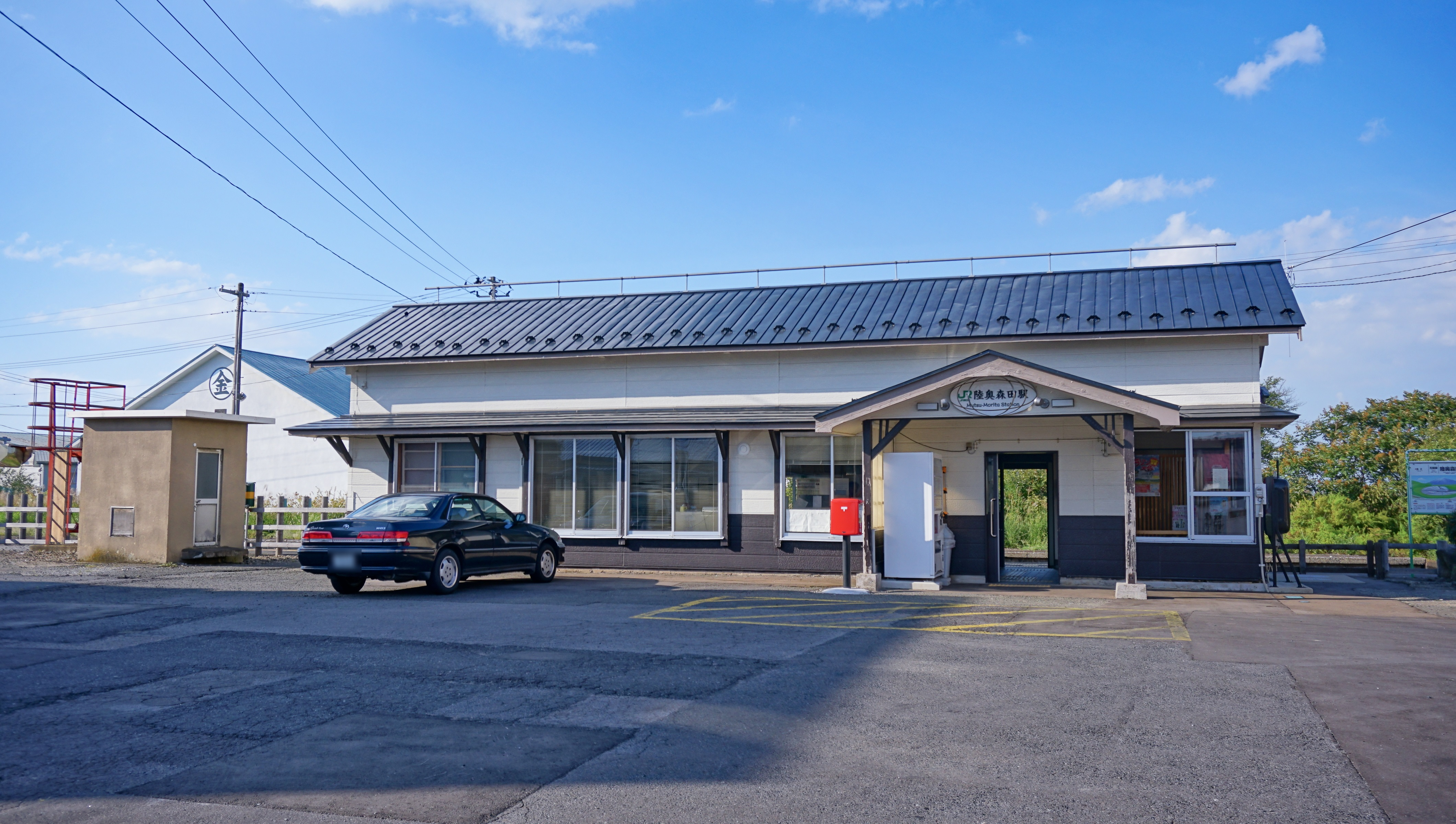
- Mutsu-Morita Station in September 2019

General information
- Location: Tokomai Midorino 11, Morita-chō, Tsugaru-shi, Aomori-ken 038-2817; Japan
- Coordinates: 40°46′54.32″N 140°20′20.35″E
- Operator: JR East
- Line: ■ Gonō Line
- Distance: 114.5 kilometers from Higashi-Noshiro
- Platforms: 2 side platforms

Other information
- Status: Staffed
- Website: www.jreast.co.jp/estation/station/info.aspx?StationCd=1544

History
- Opened: November 11, 1924

Passengers
- FY2016: 80 (daily)

Services
Preceding station	JR East	Following station
Koshimizu towards Higashi-Noshiro	Gonō Line Rapid	Nakata One-way operation
Koshimizu towards Higashi-Noshiro	Gonō Line Local	Nakata towards Hirosaki
Location
- Location within Japan

Mutsu-Morita Station (陸奥森田駅, Mutsu-Morita-eki) is a railway station located in the city of Tsugaru, Aomori Prefecture, Japan, operated by the East Japan Railway Company (JR East). The station is a kan'i itaku station, administered by Goshogawara Station, and operated by Tsugaru municipal authority, with point-of-sales terminal installed. Ordinary tickets, express tickets, and reserved-seat tickets for all JR lines are on sale (no connecting tickets).

== Lines ==
Mutsu-Morita Station is served by the Gonō Line. It is 114.5 rail kilometers from the terminus of the line at Higashi-Noshiro.

== Station layout ==
Mutsu-Morita Station has a dual opposed ground-level side platforms, but one platform is not in use, and the other serves bi-directional traffic. The station building is attended during normal daylight operating hours.

=== Platforms ===
1	■ Gonō Line	For Goshogawara, Ajigasawa and Fukaura; For Kawabe, Hirosaki and Aomori
2	■ Gonō Line	not in use

== History ==
Mutsu-Morita Station was opened on November 11, 1924 as a station on the Japanese Government Railways (JGR) in former Morita Village. With the privatization of the Japanese National Railways (successor of JGR) on April 1, 1987, it came under the operational control of JR East.

== Passenger statistics ==
In fiscal 2016, the station was used by an average of 80 passengers daily (boarding passengers only).

== Surrounding area ==
- National Route 101
- Morita Post office

== See also ==
- List of railway stations in Japan
