= Kizukuri, Aomori =

Kizukuri 木造町
- Former municipality
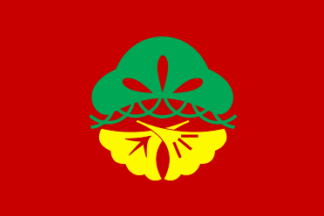
- Flag Emblem

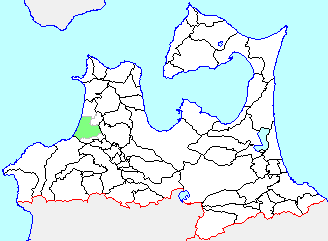
- Location of Kizukuri in Aomori Prefecture

- Location in Japan
- Coordinates: 40°48′30.5″N 140°22′49.8″E
- Country: Japan
- Region: Tōhoku
- Prefecture: Aomori Prefecture
- District: Nishitsugaru
- Merged: 11 February 2005 (now part of Tsugaru)

Area
  - Total: 120.07 km^{2} (46.36 sq mi)

Population (1 February 2005)
  - Total: 19,123
  - Density: 159.3/km^{2} (413/sq mi)
- Time zone: UTC+09:00 (JST)
- Symbols
- Bird: Common cuckoo
- Flower: Iris
- Tree: Japanese black pine

Kizukuri (木造町, Kizukuri-machi) was a town located in Nishitsugaru District in western Aomori Prefecture, Japan.

Kizukuri was located in central Tsugaru Peninsula, facing the Sea of Japan. The area was part of Hirosaki Domain during the Edo period. Kizukuri was created on 30 March 1955 through the merger of Shussei, Kawayoke, Shibata, and Koshimizu villages.

On 11 February 2005, Kizukuri, along with the villages of Inagaki, Kashiwa, Morita and Shariki (all from Nishitsugaru District), was merged to create the city of Tsugaru, and thus no longer exists as an independent municipality.

At the time of its merger, Kizukuri had an estimated population of 19,123 and a population density of 159.3 persons per km^{2}. The total area was 120.07 km^{2}. The town economy was dominated by agriculture and commercial fishing, and the town was served by Kizukuri Station on the Gonō Line of JR East.

Kizukuri has many festivals in the summer including the Nebuta festival (held in other towns as well). The Nebuta festival is where certain districts of the town form teams who build large Papier-mâché statues of warriors fighting monsters or other scenes.
