= Morita, Aomori =

Morita 森田村
- Former municipality
- Flag Emblem

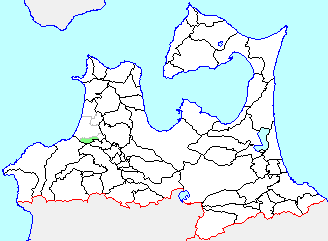
- Location of Morita in Aomori Prefecture

- Location in Japan
- Coordinates: 40°46′44.8″N 140°21′2.1″E
- Country: Japan
- Region: Tōhoku
- Prefecture: Aomori Prefecture
- District: Nishitsugaru
- Merged: 1 February 2005 (now part of Tsugaru)

Area
  - Total: 24.12 km^{2} (9.31 sq mi)

Population (1 February 2005)
  - Total: 5,011
  - Density: 207.75/km^{2} (538.1/sq mi)
- Time zone: UTC+09:00 (JST)
- Symbols
- Bird: Oriental turtle-dove
- Flower: Apple
- Tree: Japanese black pine

Morita (森田村, Morita-mura) was a village located in Nishitsugaru District in western Aomori Prefecture, Japan.

Morita Village was located in the central portion of Tsugaru Peninsula. The area was part of Hirosaki Domain during the Edo period. After the Meiji Restoration, Morita Village was created on 1 April 1889.

On 11 February 2005, Morita, along with the town of Kizukuri, and the villages of Inagaki, Kashiwa and Shariki (all from Nishitsugaru District), was merged to create the city of Tsugaru, and thus no longer exists as an independent municipality.

At the time of its merger, Morita had an estimated population of 5,011 and a population density of 207.75 persons per km^{2}. The total area was 24.12 km^{2}. The village economy was dominated by agriculture. The village was served by Mutsu-Morita Station and Nakata Station on the Gonō Line of JR East.
