= Cwm Dewi =

Protected area in Pembrokeshire, Wales

- Site of Special Scientific Interest
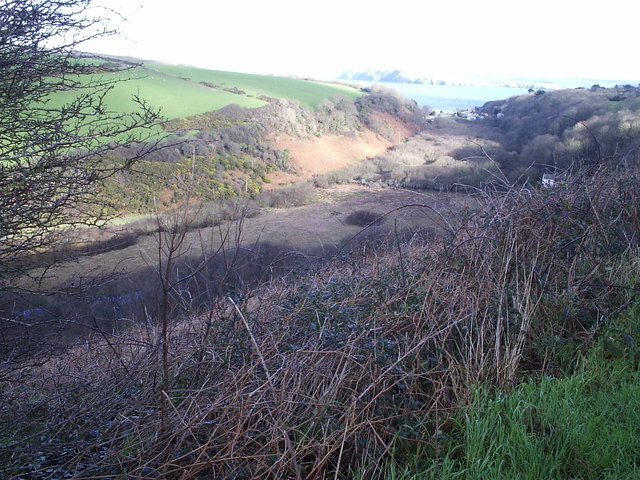
- The Cwm in January 2005

- Location within Wales
- Location of Cwm Dewi.
- Area of search: Pembrokeshire
- Grid reference: SN0074739845
- Coordinates: 52.021°N 4.905°W
- Interest: Geological
- Area: 22.02 hectares (54.4 acres)
- Notification date: 2010

Cwm Dewi is a Site of Special Scientific Interest (or SSSI) in Pembrokeshire, South Wales. It has been designated as a Site of Special Scientific Interest since January 2010 in an attempt to protect its important geological elements. The site has an area of 22.02 hectares (54.4 acres) and is managed by Natural Resources Wales.

== Type ==
This site is designated due to its geological qualities: a spectacular landform created during the Ice Age.

Cwm Dewi SSSI is one of the most important sites in Britain where Quaternary landforms and deposits can be studied. The valley which separates Dinas Island from the adjacent plateau was formed by the meltwater produced when an ice sheet which covered north Pembrokeshire thawed.

== See also ==
- List of Sites of Special Scientific Interest in Pembrokeshire
