= Cheseborough =

19th-century American merchant ship

- The Cheseborough, wrecked off the coast of Shariki, Aomori, Japan in 1889.

History

America
- Name: Cheseborough
- Owner: Arthur Sewall & Co., Bath, Maine
- Launched: 1878
- Fate: Wrecked, October 30, 1889

General characteristics
- Tons burthen: 1461 tons bm
- Length: 204 ft (62 m)
- Beam: 40 ft (12 m)
- Depth of hold: 24 ft (7.3 m)
- Sail plan: Full-rigged ship

The Cheseborough was a 19th-century American merchant ship which wrecked off the coast of Japan in 1889.

== Ship history ==
The full-rigged ship Cheseborough was built and owned by E. & A. Sewall in Bath, Maine, U.S.A. She was named after Andronicus Cheseborough, a prominent shipping merchant from San Francisco. She was steadily employed in the grain trade between North Atlantic ports and West Coast ports of North America, until 1889 when she was diverted from her normal routes to transport case oil to Japan.

== Fate ==
After discharging most of the 65,000 cases of oil from Philadelphia in Kobe, Japan, she proceeded under ballast to Hakodate where she took on 2,230 tons of sulphur. She set sail on October 28, 1889, for New York. Two days later on October 30, she lost her main-topgallant and head sails in a typhoon and ran aground off the coast of Shariki, Aomori Prefecture, Japan. In a courageous rescue, the villagers saved a number of the crew and nursed them back to health.

All aboard would have been lost had not the villagers, braving the wind and waves, tied ropes around themselves and ventured into the sea in a heroic attempt to carry any survivors to safety. Those remaining on shore also gave the best of their efforts by lighting fires, bringing food and clothes. Two youths ran the entire 40 miles (64 km) to the prefectural capital, Aomori, to summon help. Of the twenty-three crew members, nineteen drowned, and the other four were rescued by fishermen and villagers who worked through storms at the risk of their lives. Reports from the time indicate Mrs. Kudou, a local villager, held a frozen sailor against her bare body in an effort to save his life.

== Connection between nations ==
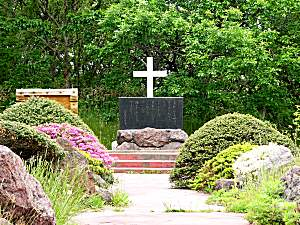
The Cheseborough Memorial in Shariki Village. The inscription in Japanese reads, "The people who disappeared into the rough seas. The people who survived. The people who rescued by doing their best. Now, there is no one left. Only the bleat of the gulls and the sound of the sea are the same as the past."

From this incident, a friendship began between the village of Shariki, Japan, and the city of Bath, Maine. In 1994, officials of both municipalities signed a sister-city agreement promising future cooperation and further exchange.

A letter from President of The United States to the citizens of Shariki, Japan:

"I commend you for honoring those people who lost their lives when the Cheseborough sank in 1890. By hosting the Bath, Maine, Junior High exchange students, you are contributing to our two nations efforts to sustain and deepen the goodwill that exists between us. The exchange program between students of Shariki and students of Bath is a shining example of the value of promoting mutual understanding and appreciation of different cultures. A strong relationship between Japan and the United States is vital in helping to meet the challenges that the future holds for us. Student exchange programs are especially important building blocks for stronger ties between Japan and the United States. Best wishes for any future exchanges and long-lasting friendships."

—Bill Clinton

== Cheseborough Cup ==
In memory of the event, the town of Shariki hosts the "Cheseborough Cup Swim Ekiden." The event is a relay which combines a swim race and long-distance run. Its slogan: "Sending a message of Courage and Love across the Seas."
