= Shariki, Aomori =

Shariki 車力村
- Former municipality
- Flag Seal

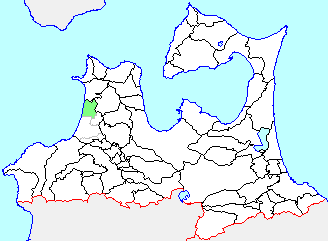
- Location of Shariki in Aomori Prefecture

- Location in Japan
- Coordinates: 40°56′50.9″N 140°21′33.4″E
- Country: Japan
- Region: Tōhoku
- Prefecture: Aomori Prefecture
- District: Nishitsugaru
- Merged: 11 February 2005 (now part of Tsugaru)

Area
  - Total: 62.17 km^{2} (24.00 sq mi)

Population (1 February 2005)
  - Total: 5,730
  - Density: 92.16/km^{2} (238.7/sq mi)
- Time zone: UTC+09:00 (JST)
- Symbols
- Bird: Japanese bush-warbler
- Flower: Lilium
- Tree: Japanese black pine

Shariki (車力村, Shariki-mura) was a village located in Nishitsugaru District in western Aomori Prefecture, Japan. The village was situated on the west coast of Tsugaru Peninsula, facing the Sea of Japan.

== History ==
The area was part of Hirosaki Domain during the Edo period. After the Meiji Restoration, Shariki Village was created in 1889.

=== Shipwreck ===
On 30 October 1889, the Cheseborough, an American merchant ship from Bath, Maine, wrecked a mile from the coast of the village. The villagers made a great effort to save the sailors, unfortunately nineteen of them did not survive the incident. After the remainder of the sailors recovered, they returned to the United States but maintained their relationship with the people of Shariki. This relationship eventually resulted in the village establishing a sister-city agreement with Bath, Maine.

=== Merge into Tsugaru city ===
On 11 February 2005, Shariki, along with the town of Kizukuri, and the villages of Inagaki, Kashiwa and Morita (all from Nishitsugaru District), was merged to create the city of Tsugaru, and thus no longer exists as an independent municipality, however, the city inherited Shariki's relationship with Bath.

== Population ==
At the time of its merger, Shariki had an estimated population of 5,730 and a population density of 92.16 persons per km^{2}. The total area was 62.17 km^{2}. The village economy was dominated by agriculture and commercial fishing.
