= Nishitsugaru District, Aomori =

District in Aomori prefecture, Japan

Coordinates: 40.611°N 140.056°E

- Japan > Tōhoku region > Aomori Prefecture > Nishitsugaru District

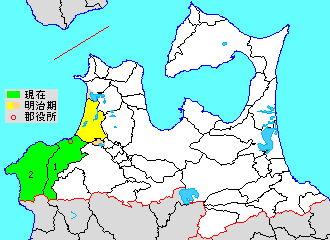
Map showing original extent of Nishitsugaru District in Aomori Prefecture green - current yellow - former extent in early Meiji period: 1. - Ajigasawa; 2. – Fukaura

Nishitsugaru District (西津軽郡, Nishitsugaru-gun) is a rural district located in Aomori Prefecture, Japan.

As of September 2013, the district had an estimated population of 19,666 and an area of 831.85 km^{2}. All of the city of Tsugaru was formerly part of Nishitsugaru District. In terms of national politics, the district is represented in the Diet of Japan's House of Representatives as a part of the Aomori 3rd district.

== Towns and villages ==
- Ajigasawa
- Fukaura

== History ==
The area of Nishitsugaru District was formerly part of Mutsu Province. At the time of the Meiji restoration of 1868, the area consisted of one towns (Ajigasawa) and 218 villages, all formerly under the control of Hirosaki Domain. Aomori Prefecture was founded on December 13, 1871, and Nishitsugaru District was carved out for former Tsugaru District on October 30, 1878.

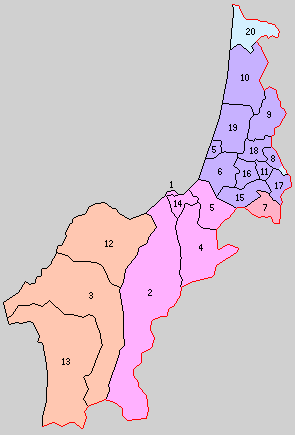
Historic Map of Nishitsugaru District: 1.Ajigasawa 2.Akaishi 3.Fukaura 4.Nakamura 5.Narusawa 6.Koshimizu 7.Mizumoto 8.Kawayoke 9.Inagaki 10.Shariki 11.Kizukuri 12.Ōdose 13.Iwasaki 14.Maito 15.Morita 16.Shibata 17.Kashiwa 18.Shussei 19.Tateoka 20.Jusan Purple= Tsugaru, Pink=Ajigasawa, Orange=Fukaura, Red=to Kitatsugaru District, Light Blue=to Goshogawara

With the establishment of the municipality system on April 1, 1889, Nishitsugaru District, was organized into one town (Ajigasawa) and 19 villages were established.

- 1905 - Kizukuri was elevated to town status.
- 1926 - Fukaura was elevated to town status.
- 1955 – Mizumoto and Jusan villages were transferred to Kitatsugaru District
- On February 11, 2005 the town of Kizukuri and the villages of Inagaki, Kashiwa, Morita, and Shariki merged forming the new city of Tsugaru.
- On March 31, 2005 the village of Iwasaki merged into the town of Fukaura.
