= Daini-Michinoku Toll Road =

Road in Aomori Prefecture, Japan

Daini-Michinoku Toll Road
- 第二みちのく有料道路

Route information
- Maintained by Aomori Prefecture Road Public Corporation
- Length: 8.3 km (5.2 mi)
- Existed: 18 December 1992–present

Major junctions
- North end: Rokunohe, Aomori. Aomori Prefecture Route 10
- Rokunohe Interchange; Kamikita Expressway
- South end: Oirase, Aomori. Shimodamomoishi Interchange; Momoishi Toll Road

Location
- Country: Japan

Highway system
- National highways of Japan; Expressways of Japan

The Daini-Michinoku Toll Road (第二みちのく有料道路 Daini Michinoku Yūryōdōro) is a two-lane toll road in Aomori Prefecture that connects the towns Rokunohe and Oirase. The Daini-Michinoku Toll Road was designated in 1987 as part of a single expressway running from the capital city of Aomori Prefecture, Aomori to the prefecture's second largest city, Hachinohe. The road is managed by the Aomori Prefecture Road Public Corporation and is numbered E4A as an extension of the Tōhoku Expressway.

== Tolls ==
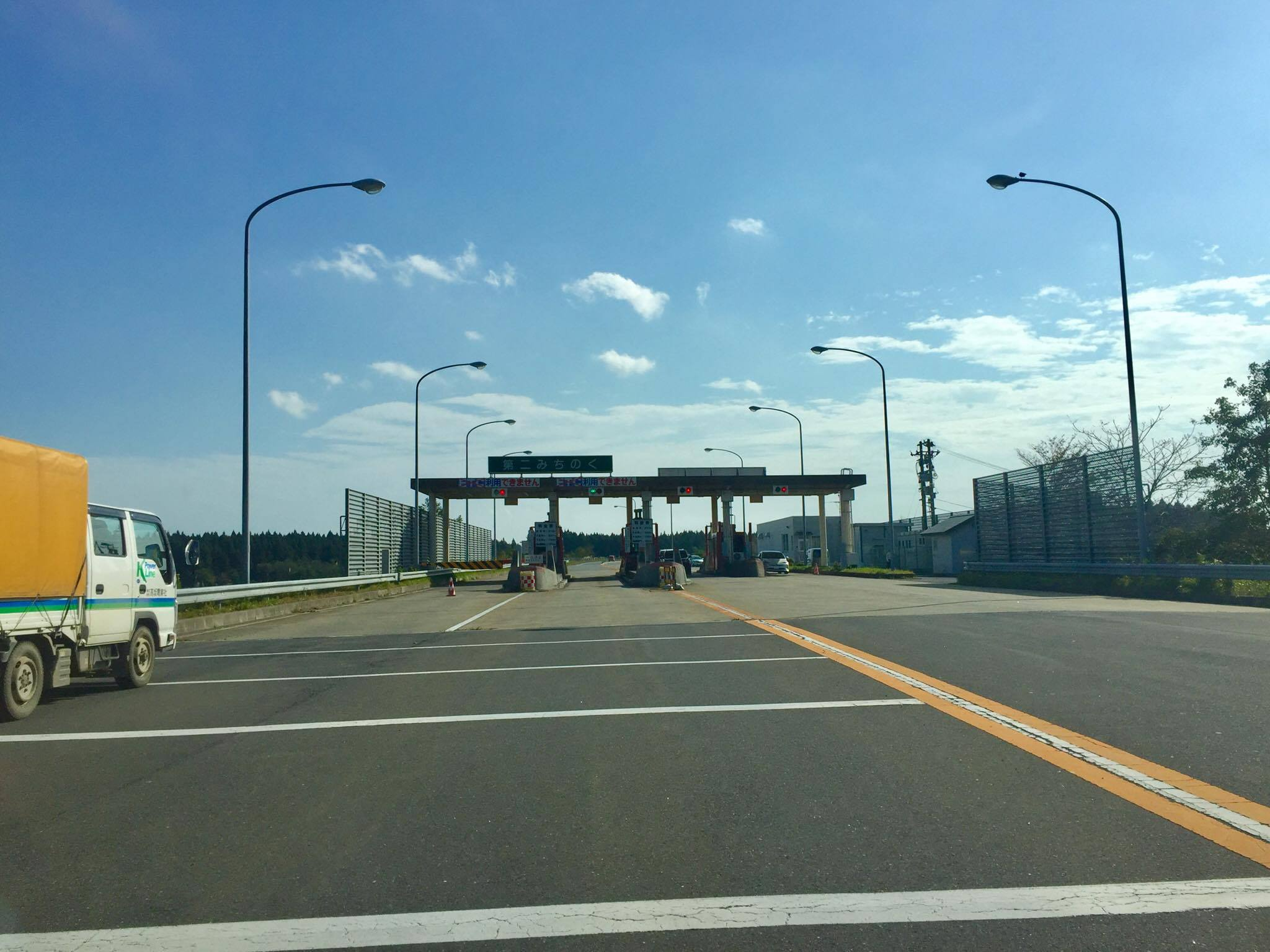
The toll gate of the Daini-Michinoku Toll Road, prior to the addition of the ETC gate

As of 10 March 2025, the Shimoda toll gate for the Daini-Michinoku Toll Road accepts ETC when traveling north and south bound. Cash tolls are still accepted; however, coupon tickets are not. Otherwise, prices for use of just the Daini-Michinoku Toll Road are as follows:

- Standard-sized and Medium-sized car: ¥220 (¥110 for disabled people)
- Large vehicles with 4 axles or less: ¥330
- Large vehicles with 5 or more axles: ¥740
- Kei car: ¥150 (¥80 for disabled people)
- Light vehicles, etc.: ¥80

== Route description ==
From its southern terminus with Momoishi Road, the Daini-Michinoku Toll Road travels north from Shimoda-Momoishi Interchange in Oirase. The speed limit for the toll road is 60 km/h. The road quickly enters an agricultural area after its start. Three kilometers from Shimoda-Momoishi Interchange the road meets its toll booth. There are two gates servicing traffic in each direction. A parking area is available for drivers. At the booth the road proceeds northwest. Approximately 3.6 kilometers from the booth the road meets Aomori Prefecture Route 10 at an interchange. Shortly after the interchange, the road gradually curves north. Along the gradual curve, the toll road continues on a ramp exiting to the left from the Kamikita Expressway. The Kamikita Expressway proceeds to continue northwest towards Aomori. The ramp carries the toll road on to its northern terminus at an at-grade junction with Aomori Prefecture Route 10 at the southern city limits of Misawa.

== Future ==
The toll road is planned to be incorporated into a single expressway that extends north and west to connect with the Aomori Expressway and the northern terminus of the Tōhoku Expressway at the Aomori Interchange. This will be done by linking the Kamikita Expressway and Michinoku Toll Road to the Aomori Expressway. The thirty-year toll collection period for the use of the road was set to expire in March 2022, but as of March 2025 the tolls are still collected.

== Junction list ==
The entire toll road is in Aomori Prefecture.

Location	km	mi	Exit	Name	Destinations	Notes
Rokunohe	0	0.0	—	Rokunohe	Kamikita Expressway north – Shichinohe, Aomori	E4A continues north as the Kamikita Expressway
Oirase	2.2	1.4	—	Misawa-Towada-Shimoda	Aomori Prefecture Route 10 - Misawa, Misawa Airport	
Oirase	5.6	3.5	TB	Shimoda Toll Booth		Northern end of tolled section
Oirase	8.3	5.2	8	Shimoda Momishi	Momoishi Toll Road south National Route 45	End of concurrency with National Route 45; E4A continues south as Momoishi Road; tolls continue south along E4A.
1.000 mi = 1.609 km; 1.000 km = 0.621 mi: Concurrency terminus; Tolled; Route transition
