= Aomori Belt Highway =

Highway in Aomori, Japan

National Route 7
- 国道7号
- Aomori Belt Highway 青森環状道路 (Aomori Kanjō-dōro)

Route information
- Length: 16.6 km (10.3 mi)
- Component highways: National Route 7

Major junctions
- West end: National Route 7 / National Route 101
- Tōhoku Expressway; Aomori Expressway; National Route 103
- East end: National Route 4 / National Route 45

Location
- Country: Japan

Highway system
- National highways of Japan; Expressways of Japan

The Aomori Belt Highway (青森環状道路 Aomori Kanjō-dōro) is a major highway located entirely in the city of Aomori in northern Japan. Signed as National Route 7, it is a bypass that travels to the south of the central district of the city. Starting to the southwest of central Aomori near the Sannai-Maruyama Site, it connects the main route of National Route 7 to National Route 4 east of the central district of Aomori.

== Route description ==
The Aomori Belt Highway primarily serves as a bypass of the central part of the city of Aomori. For planning purposes the city considers the area outside of the highway to be the "outer" part of the city. It starts at a junction with its parent route, the main line of National Route 7, near the Sannai-Maruyama archaeological site in southwestern Aomori city. From there, it travels southeast towards Aomori Interchange, a junction between the Aomori Belt Highway and the northern terminus of the Tōhoku Expressway. Curving to the south and then east, it passes by the Sannai-Maruyama Site and the Aomori Museum of Art and then begins paralleling the Aomori Expressway. The Aomori Belt Highway serves as a frontage road for the expressway for the next several kilometers with access to the limited-access road at Aomori-chūō Interchange. While heading east, the highway intersects several roads that lead to and from the center of Aomori, including National Route 103 and Aomori Prefecture Route 120. After the intersection with National Route 103, the highway begins slowly curving to the northeast and eventually to the north. When the belt highway curves to the north, the Aomori Expressway stops paralleling the highway, continuing northeast. About 2 kilometers (1 mi) north of this split the Aomori Belt Highway terminates at an intersection with National Route 4.

== History ==
The Aomori Belt Highway was initially planned as one of three highways that passed through the city of Aomori from west to east in 1964. It was originally opened as a two-lane road in 2002, but was mostly expanded to a four-lane highway by 2009 serving as a frontage road to the Aomori Expressway. The interchange connecting it to the Aomori Expressway was completed on 28 September 2003 at a cost of 79.5 billion Japanese yen.

== List of major junctions ==
The entire highway is located within Aomori Prefecture. All junctions listed are at-grade intersections unless noted otherwise.

Location	km	mi	Destinations	Notes
Aomori	0.0	0.0	National Route 7 / National Route 101 (Aomori West Bypass) – Hirosaki, Fujisaki, Central Aomori, Ferry Wharf, Shin-Aomori Station	Western terminus
Aomori	3.1	1.9	Tōhoku Expressway south – Tokyo, Sendai, Morioka	Aomori Interchange (E4 exit 54); northern terminus of E4
Aomori	5.9	3.7	Aomori Prefecture Route 44 (Aomori-Nonai Loop Route) west – Central Aomori, Namidate	Western end of Aomori Prefecture Route 44 concurrency
Aomori	6.6	4.1	Aomori Prefecture Route 44 (Aomori-Nonai Loop Route) east – Aomori Airport	Eastern end of Aomori Prefecture Route 44 concurrency
Aomori	8.3	5.2	Aomori Prefecture Route 120 – Prefecture office, city office, Aomori Station, Aomori Airport, Aomori Industrial Park	
Aomori	9.0	5.6	Aomori Expressway – to Michinoku Toll Road, Noheji, Hirosaki, Morioka	Aomori-chūō Interchange (E4A exit 55)
Aomori	10.0	6.2	National Route 103 (Kankō-dōri) – Central Aomori (Honchō), Lake Towada	
Aomori	10.2	6.3	Aomori Prefecture Route 27 – Lake Towada, Central Aomori (Tsutsumimachi)	
Aomori	12.1	7.5	Aomori Prefecture Route 40 (Higashi-Aomorieki-dōri) – Central Aomori (Sakaemachi), Towada (via Tashirotai)	
Aomori	12.2	7.6	Aomori Prefecture Route 124 – Central Aomori (Sakaemachi), Toyama Danchi	
Aomori	16.6	10.3	National Route 4 / National Route 45 – Central Aomori, Noheji, Towada	Eastern terminus
1.000 mi = 1.609 km; 1.000 km = 0.621 mi: Concurrency terminus
