= Aomori Prefecture Route 120 =

Road in Aomori Prefecture, Japan

Aomori Prefecture Route 120
- 青森県道120号荒川青森停車場線; Aomori-Kendō Arakawa-Aomori Teishajōsen

Route information
- Maintained by Aomori Prefecture
- Length: 5.2 km (3.2 mi)
- Existed: 1961–present

Major junctions
- South end: Aomori Prefecture Route 27
- National Route 4 National Route 7
- North end: Aomori Prefecture Route 16

Location
- Country: Japan

Highway system
- National highways of Japan; Expressways of Japan

Aomori Prefecture Route 120 (青森県道120号荒川青森停車場線 Aomori-Kendō Arakawa-Aomori Teishajō Route) is a prefectural road and former toll road, the Aomori-chūō Ōhashi Toll Road (青森中央大橋有料道路, Aomori-chūō Ōhashi Yūryōdōro), in the capital of Aomori Prefecture, Aomori. It serves as an arterial highway between Aomori Prefecture Route 27 and the central district of the city. The road is managed by the government of Aomori Prefecture.

== Route description ==
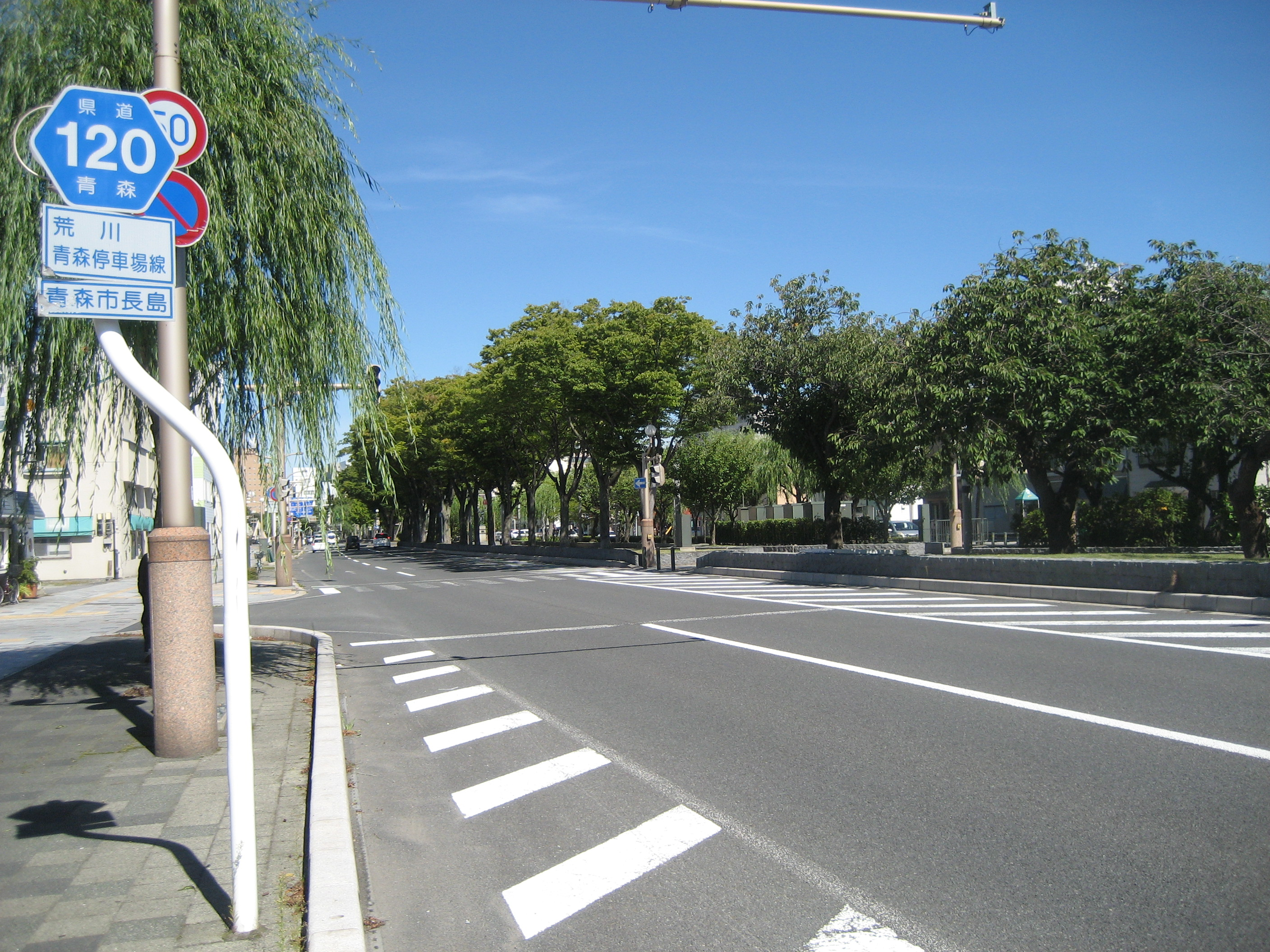
Aomori Prefecture Route 120 facing south in Central Aomori just south of its junction with National Route 4

Starting from its southern terminus at an intersection with Aomori Prefecture Route 27, Aomori Prefecture Route 120 travels north towards the central district of Aomori. It passes the main prison and library of the prefecture before coming to an intersection with the National Route 7 (Aomori Belt Highway) near Aomori-chūō Interchange. At the intersection the route passes underneath the Aomori Expressway, but there is no direct access between the expressway and Route 120. Continuing north, the road travels through a heavily commercialized area with access to many restaurants, a mall, and pachinko parlors. The road then crosses into the central district of Aomori when it is carried by a bridge over the Aoimori Railway Line. This bridge, the Aomori-chūō Ōhashi, was the site of toll booths that were removed in 2006. Route 120 next has an intersection with National Route 4 where it joins it heading towards Aomori Station. While running concurrently with National Route 4, the National Highway ends and transitions to National Route 7. Shortly after this transition, Route 120 leaves the concurrency, heading north to its northern terminus at an intersection with Aomori Prefecture Route 16 (Shinmachi Street) just east of Aomori Station.

== History ==
The route was established in 1961 as a prefecture-maintained route. In 1986 the road was upgraded to a tolled road called the Aomori-chūō Ōhashi Toll Road. The tolls on the route were removed in 2006.

== List of major junctions ==
Location	km	mi	Destinations	Notes
Aomori	0.0	0.0	Aomori Prefecture Route 27 (Takada Bypass) – Central Aomori, Fujisaki, Aomori Airport	Southern terminus; roadway continues as a city-maintained road
Aomori	1.2	0.75	National Route 7 (Aomori Belt Highway) – Hirosaki, Towada, Noheji, Aomori-chūō, Sannai-Maruyama Site	
Aomori	3.2	2.0	Southbound tollbooth	Closed
Aomori	3.8	2.4	Northbound tollbooth	Closed
Aomori	4.2	2.6	National Route 4 / National Route 45 / Aomori Prefecture Route 16 west – Hirosaki, Shin-Aomori Station, Towada, Noheji, Aomori Station, Aomori Port	Southern end of concurrency with National Routes 4 and 45
Aomori	4.6	2.9	National Route 4 south / National Route 7 south / National Route 45 south / National Route 101 south	Northern end of National Routes 4, 7, 45, and 101
Aomori	5.0	3.1	National Route 7 / National Route 101	Northern end of concurrency with National Routes 7 and 101; north of this intersection Aomori Prefecture Route 120 is a one-way (northbound) street
Aomori	5.2	3.2	Aomori Prefecture Route 16 (Shinmachi Street) – Aomori Station	Northern terminus
1.000 mi = 1.609 km; 1.000 km = 0.621 mi: Closed/former; Concurrency terminus
