= Shirakamidaketozanguchi Station =

Railway station in Fukaura, Japan

Shirakamidaketozanguchi Station 白神岳登山口駅
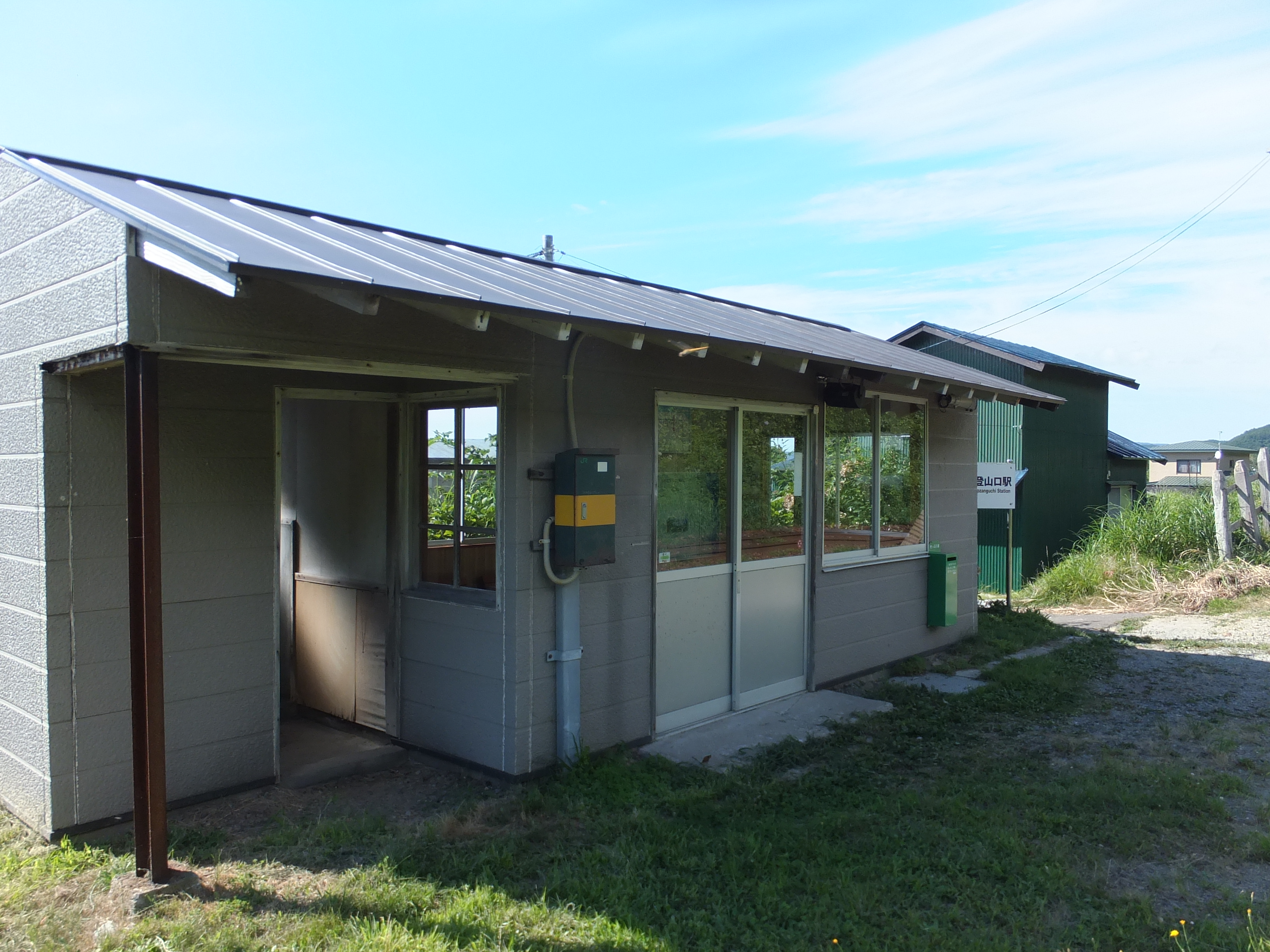
- Shirakamidaketozanguchi Station in August 2017

General information
- Location: 10 Miyazaki, Kurosaki, Fukaura-machi, Nishitsugaru-gun Aomori-ken 038-2207; Japan
- Coordinates: 40°30′48.7″N 139°57′1.2″E
- Operator: JR East
- Line: ■ Gonō Line
- Distance: 42.3 km from Higashi-Noshiro
- Platforms: 1 side platform

Other information
- Status: Unstaffed
- Website: Official website (in Japanese)

History
- Opened: June 1, 1952
- Former names: Mutsu-Kurosaki (until 2000)

Services
Preceding station	JR East	Following station
Ōmagoshi towards Higashi-Noshiro	Gonō Line Local	Matsukami towards Hirosaki
Location
- Location within Japan

Shirakamidaketozanguchi Station (白神岳登山口駅, Shirakamidake-Tozanguchi-eki) is a railway station located in the town of Fukaura, Aomori Prefecture, Japan, operated by the East Japan Railway Company (JR East).

== Lines ==
Shirakamidaketozanguchi Station is a station on the Gonō Line, and is located 42.3 kilometers from the terminus of the line at Higashi-Noshiro.

== Station layout ==
Shirakamidaketozanguchi Station has one ground-level side platform serving a single bi-directional track. The station is unattended, and is managed from Fukaura Station.

== History ==
Shirakamidaketozanguchi Station was opened on June 1, 1952 as Mutsu-Kurosaki Station (陸奥黒崎駅, Mutsu-Kurosaki-eki) on the Japanese National Railways (JNR). With the privatization of the JNR on April 1, 1987, it came under the operational control of JR East. The station was renamed to its present name on December 2, 2000.

== Surrounding area ==
- National Route 101
- Shirakami-Sanchi

== See also ==
- List of railway stations in Japan
