= Kamikita Expressway =

Free two-lane expressway in Aomori Prefecture

Kamikita Expressway
- 上北自動車道
- The Kamikita Expressway highlighted in red

Route information
- Maintained by Ministry of Land, Infrastructure and Transport
- Length: 23.8 km (14.8 mi)
- Existed: March 24, 2013–present
- Component highways: National Route 45

Major junctions
- South end: Rokunohe Junction; Daini-Michinoku Toll Road in Rokunohe, Aomori
- North end: Shichinohe-kita Interchange; National Route 4 Shichinohe, Aomori

Location
- Country: Japan

Highway system
- National highways of Japan; Expressways of Japan

The Kamikita Expressway (上北自動車道 Kamikita Jidōshyadō) is a free two-lane expressway in Aomori Prefecture connecting the towns of Shichinohe and Rokunohe. Alongside other tolled roads, the expressway is part of a series of highways that will link the Hachinohe Expressway to the Aomori Expressway. The road is managed by the Ministry of Land, Infrastructure and Transport and is numbered E4A as an extension of the Tōhoku Expressway. It is routed concurrently with an alternate route of Japan National Route 45.

== Route description ==
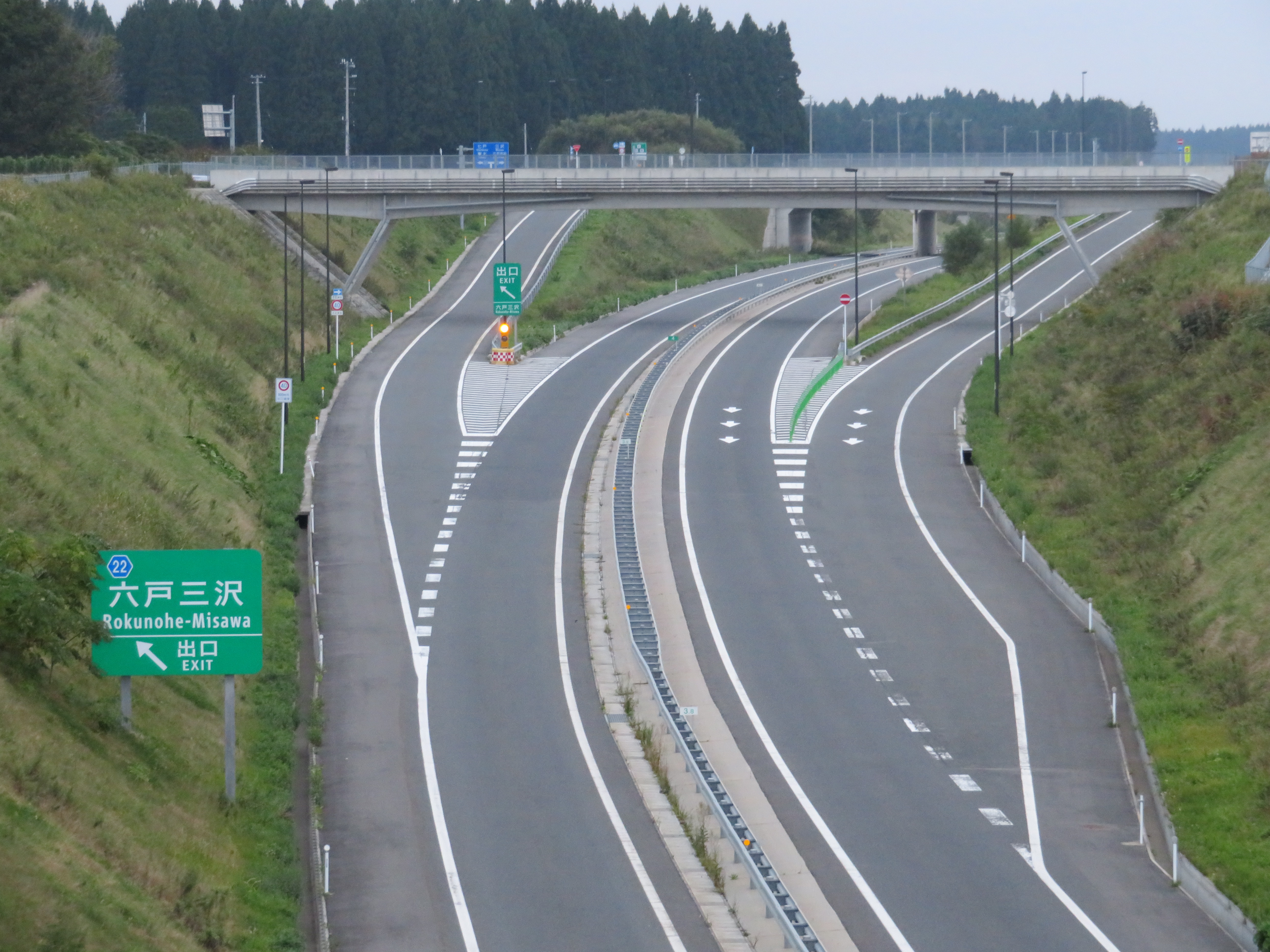
The Kamikita Expressway at Rokunohe-Misawa Interchange

The Kamikita Expressway will be made up of three sections upon completion. The easternmost section, named Kamikita Road, begins at the Kamikita Expressway's eastern terminus. This terminus lies at Rokunohe Junction, where the free expressway has a junction with the Daini-Michinoku Toll Road, a road tolled by the Aomori Prefecture Road Corporation. From this intersection, the expressway follows a northwestern heading through Rokunohe into the town, Tōhoku. In Tōhoku, the expressway meets Aomori Prefecture Route 211 at its former western terminus, Kamikita Interchange. West of this interchange lies the Kamikita-Tenmabayashi Road, a section of road that extends the route 7.8 kilometers (4.8 mi) to its current western terminus with National Route 394. Beyond Route 394, the expressway is known as the Tenmabayashi Road, a 8.3 kilometers (5.2 mi) section that is currently under construction. This section, once completed, will run to the expressway's future western terminus at National Route 4.

The speed limit is 70 km/h for the entire route; however, during the winter the speed limit is reduced to 60 km/h.

In 2015, the daily average of vehicles that traveled along the Kamikita Road section of the expressway was 3,884 between Rokunohe and Rokunohe-Misawa Interchange and 4,694 between Rokunohe-Misawa Interchange and Kamikita Interchange.

== History ==
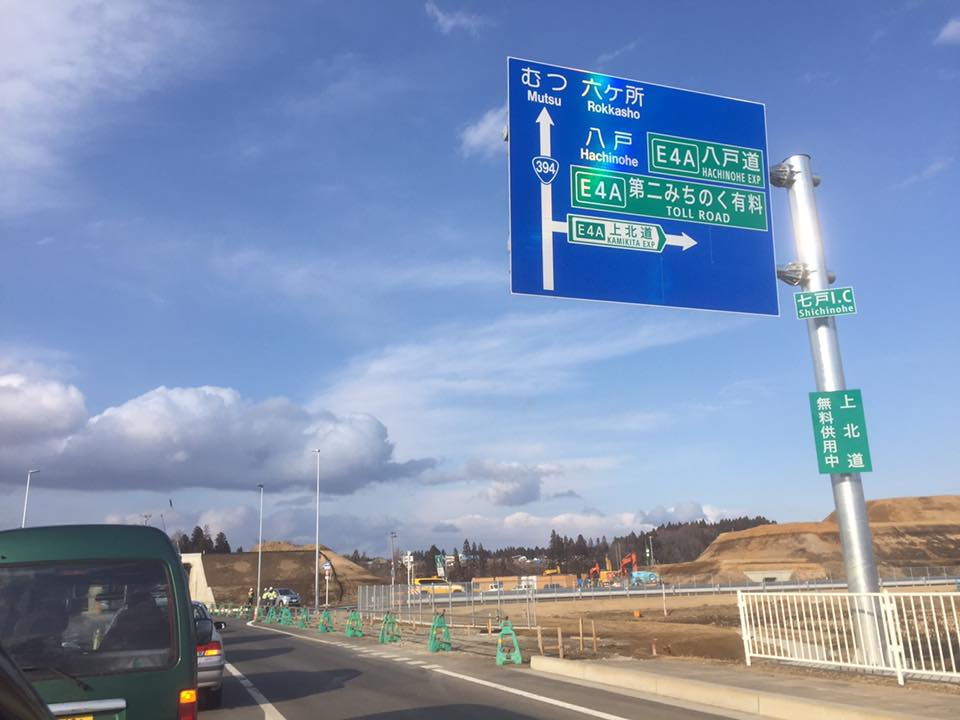
Drivers wait in the minutes before the opening of the section of the Kamikita Expressway between National Route 394 and Aomori Prefecture Route 211.

The Kamikita Expressway was designated in 1987 as part of a single expressway running from the capital city of Aomori Prefecture, Aomori to the prefecture's second largest city, Hachinohe. The first section of the expressway opened in 2013, two years ahead of schedule. This section connects the Daini-Michinoku Toll Road to Aomori Prefecture Route 211. On 27 November 2018, National Route 394 was rerouted as part of the expressway project to improve access at the junction between it and the expressway. On 8 February 2019, the interchanges that were set to open later that year were renamed from Kamikita 2 Interchange and Tenmabayashi 1 to Tōhoku Interchange and Shichinohe Interchange, respectively. The section between Route 211 and National Route 394 was opened on 16 March 2019 at 4:00 p.m. JST after festivities and a tape cutting ceremony. The expressway was extended an additional 8.3 kilometers (5.2 mi) between National Route 394 and National Route 4 on 27 November 2022.

== Future ==
Currently, the expressway is ultimately planned to connect to the Shimokita Expressway and the Michinoku Toll Road.

== Junction list ==
The entire expressway is in Aomori Prefecture.

Location	km	mi	Exit	Name	Destinations	Notes
Rokunohe	0	0.0	—	Rokunohe	Daini-Michinoku Toll Road south– Oirase, Hachinohe	Southern terminus; E4A continues south along the Daini-Michinoku Toll Road; northbound exit, southbound entrance
Rokunohe	4.1	2.5	—	Rokunohe-Misawa	Aomori Prefecture Route 22 – Rokunohe, Misawa, Shichinohe, Tōhoku	
Tōhoku	7.7	4.8	—	Kamikita	Aomori Prefecture Route 211 – to Aomori Prefecture Route 22, Aomori, Central Tōhoku, Lake Ogawara	
Tōhoku	12.8	8.0	—	Tōhoku	Aomori Prefecture Route 121 – to Aomori Prefecture Route 22, Aomori, Shichinohe, Central Tōhoku, Lake Ogawara	
Shichinohe	15.5	9.6	—	Shichinohe	National Route 394 (Enokibayashi Bypass) – to National Route 4, Shichinohe-Towada Station	
Shichinohe	23.8	14.8	—	Shichinohe-kita	National Route 4 – to Shimokita Expressway, Noheji, Towada, Shichinohe-Towada Station; Aomori Prefecture Route 242 west – to Michinoku Toll Road, Aomori	At-grade intersection; northern terminus as of September 2023; E4A resumes beyond the interchange via Aomori Prefecture Route 242 as the Michinoku Expressway
1.000 mi = 1.609 km; 1.000 km = 0.621 mi: Incomplete access
