= Matsukami Station =

Railway station in Fukaura, Aomori Prefecture, Japan

Matsukami Station 松神駅
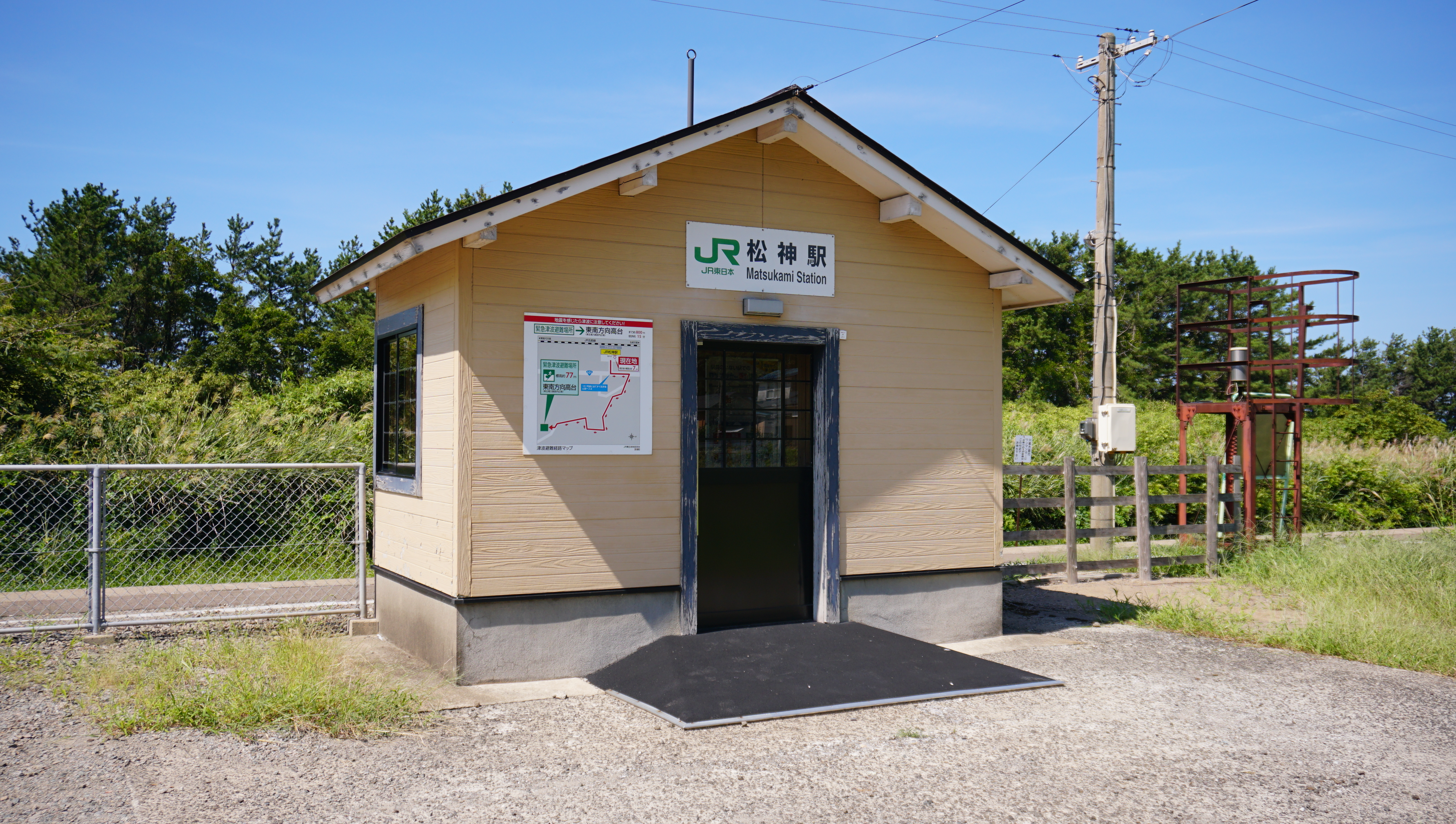
- Matsukami Station in September 2019

General information
- Location: Matsugami Kami-Hamamatsu 41, Fukaura-machi, Nishitsugaru-gun, Aomori-ken 038-2206; Japan
- Coordinates: 40°32′06.49″N 139°56′47.76″E
- Operator: JR East
- Line: ■ Gonō Line
- Distance: 44.7 km from Higashi-Noshiro
- Platforms: 1 side platform

Other information
- Status: Unstaffed
- Website: Official website (in Japanese)

History
- Opened: October 14, 1932

Services
Preceding station	JR East	Following station
Shirakamidaketozanguchi towards Higashi-Noshiro	Gonō Line Local	Jūniko towards Hirosaki
Location
- Location within Japan

Matsukami Station (松神駅, Matsukami-eki) is a railway station located in the town of Fukaura, Aomori Prefecture Japan, operated by the East Japan Railway Company (JR East).

== Lines ==
Matsukami Station is a station on the Gonō Line, and is located 44.7 kilometers from the terminus of the line at Higashi-Noshiro.

== Station layout ==
Matsukami Station has one ground-level side platform serving a single bi-directional track. The station is unattended, and is managed from Fukaura Station.

== History ==
Matsukami Station was opened on October 14, 1932, as a station on the Japanese Government Railways (JGR). With the privatization of the Japanese National Railways (successor of JGR) on April 1, 1987, it came under the operational control of JR East. The station has been unattended since 1971.

== Surrounding area ==
- National Route 101

== See also ==
- List of railway stations in Japan
