= Aomori-chūō Interchange =

- 青森中央インターチェンジ Aomori-chūō Intāchenji
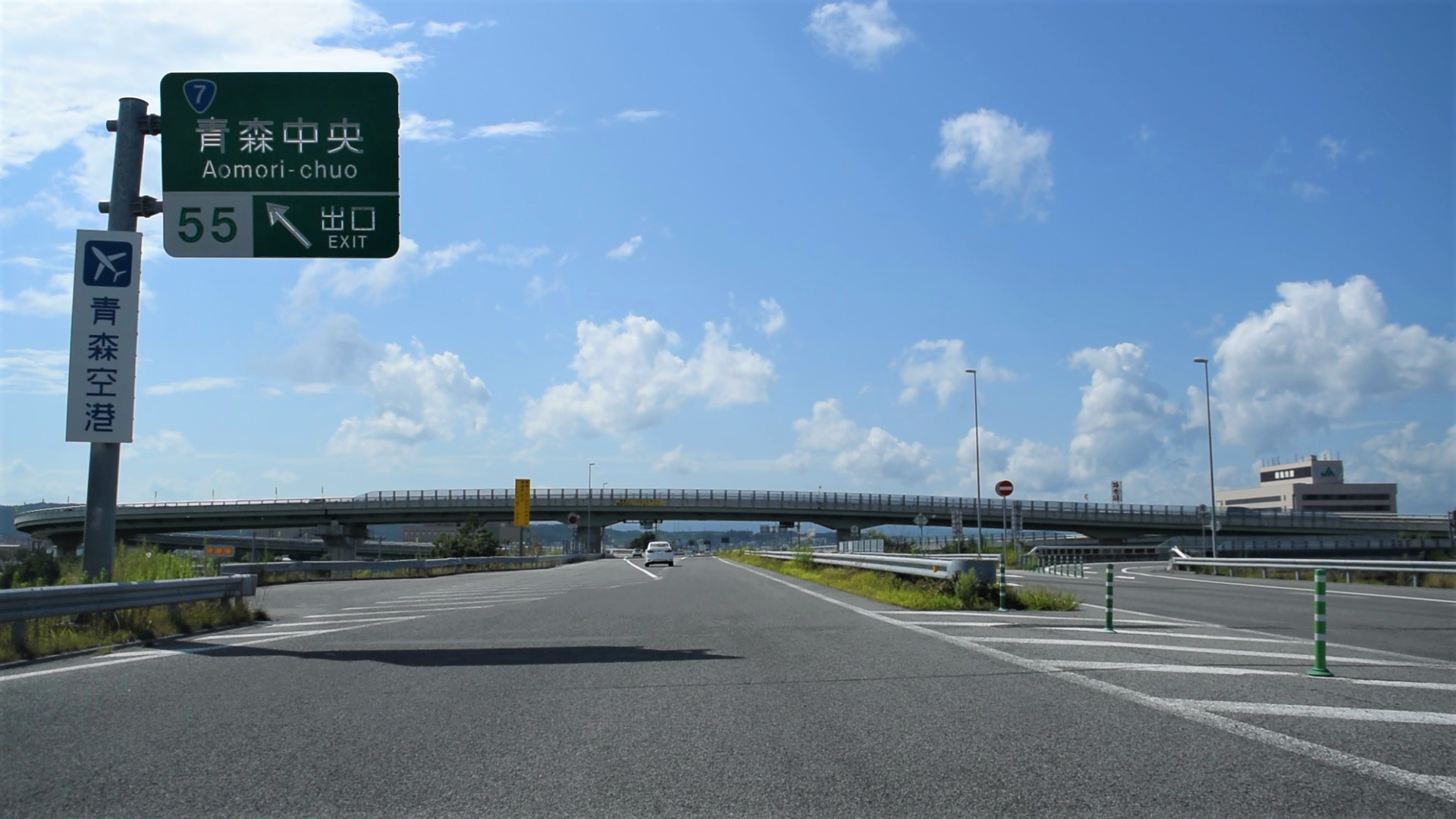
- Aomori-chūō Interchange as seen from westbound Aomori Expressway.
- Interactive map of Aomori-chūō Interchange

Location
- Aomori, Aomori 〒030-0111
- Coordinates: 40.79625°N 140.743167°E
- Roads at junction: Aomori Expressway; National Route 7 (Aomori Belt Highway)

Construction
- Type: Three-level continuous green-T hybrid interchange
- Opened: September 28, 2003
- Maximum height: 20 m (66 ft)
- Maintained by: East Nippon Expressway Company

The Aomori-chūō Interchange (青森中央インターチェンジ, Aomori-chūō Intāchenji) is a tolled single-point urban interchange along the Aomori Expressway in Aomori, Japan. It is the closest expressway interchange to the center of that city. The interchange is owned, tolled, and operated by East Nippon Expressway Company.

== Description ==
The Aomori-chūō Interchange, south of Central Aomori, is a continuous green-T hybrid interchange. The interchange is 6.1 kilometres (3.8 mi) from Aomori IC and 9.5 kilometres (5.9 mi) from Aomori-higashi IC, the respective western and eastern termini of the expressway. It is a junction of the Aomori Expressway and the Aomori Belt Highway (National Route 7), which serves as an access road along much of the expressway.

It is the only interchange with three or more levels in the city and one of three in Aomori Prefecture. The roadways on the three levels are:

- Level I: National Route 7 and an unnamed road signed to a business park named Tonya-machi (問屋町).
- Level II: Aomori Expressway and ramps to and from eastbound Aomori Expressway
- Level III: Ramps to and from westbound Aomori Expressway

Toll booths are located along Aomori Expressway and at the converging point of the interchange's ramps.

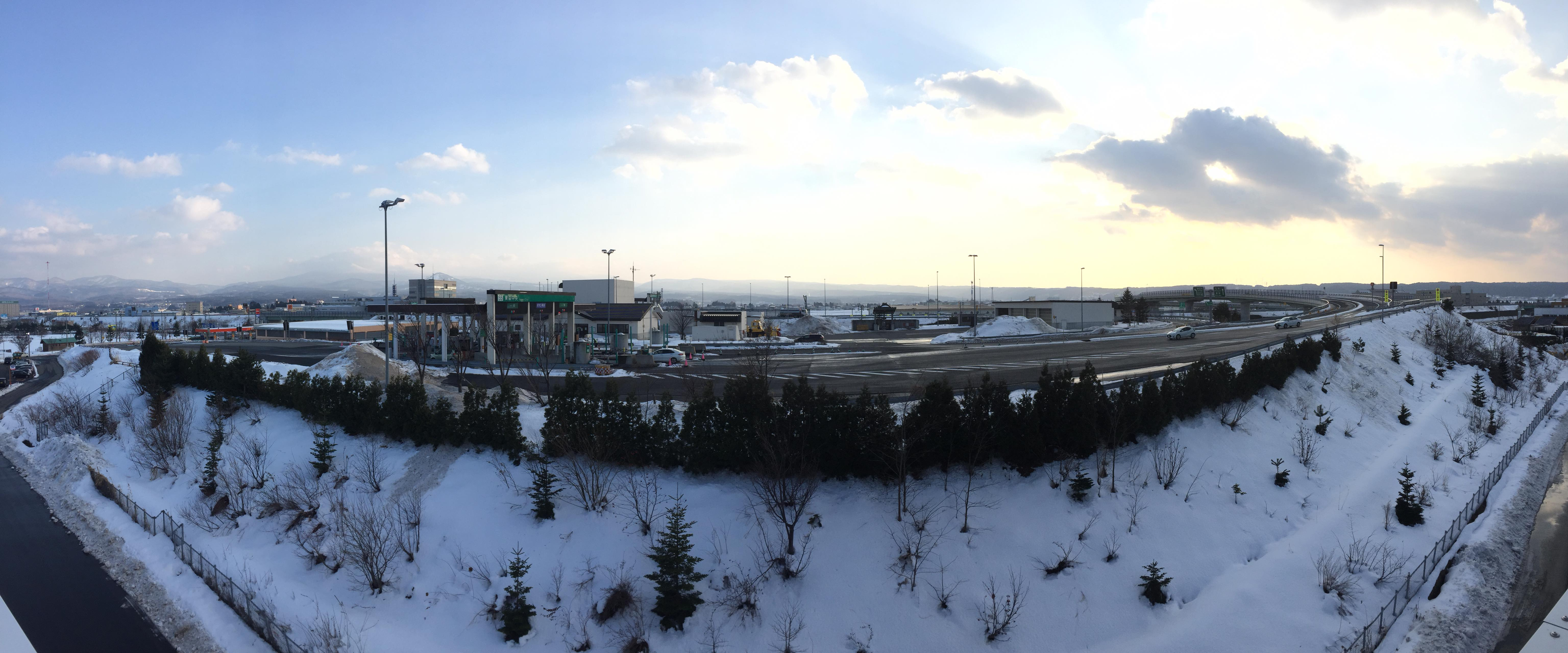

== History ==
Construction on Aomori-chūō Interchange began in 1999, prior to the opening of the Aomori Expressway. The interchange was opened on September 28, 2003 at a cost of 79.5 billion Japanese yen. The completion of the expressway and interchange reduced travel times from the Tōhoku Expressway to Central Aomori by 11 minutes and reduced congestion along the Aomori West Bypass.
