= Aomori West Bypass =

Road in Japan

Aomori West Bypass
- 国道%route%号
- 西バイ (Nishibai)

Route information
- Length: 7.8 km (4.8 mi)

Major junctions
- From: National Route 7
- National Route 280
- To: National Route 4

Location
- Country: Japan

Highway system
- National highways of Japan; Expressways of Japan

The Aomori West Bypass (青森西バイパス Aomori Nishi Bypass) is a major highway located entirely in the city of Aomori in northern Japan. The highway main function is to link the western part of the city to its center. Signed as National Route 7, it connects the main section of National Route 7 to the northern terminus of National Route 4, meeting at Hakko Dori in front of the prefecture office of Aomori. The route also carries National Route 101 to its northern terminus at National Route 4 as well.

== Route description ==
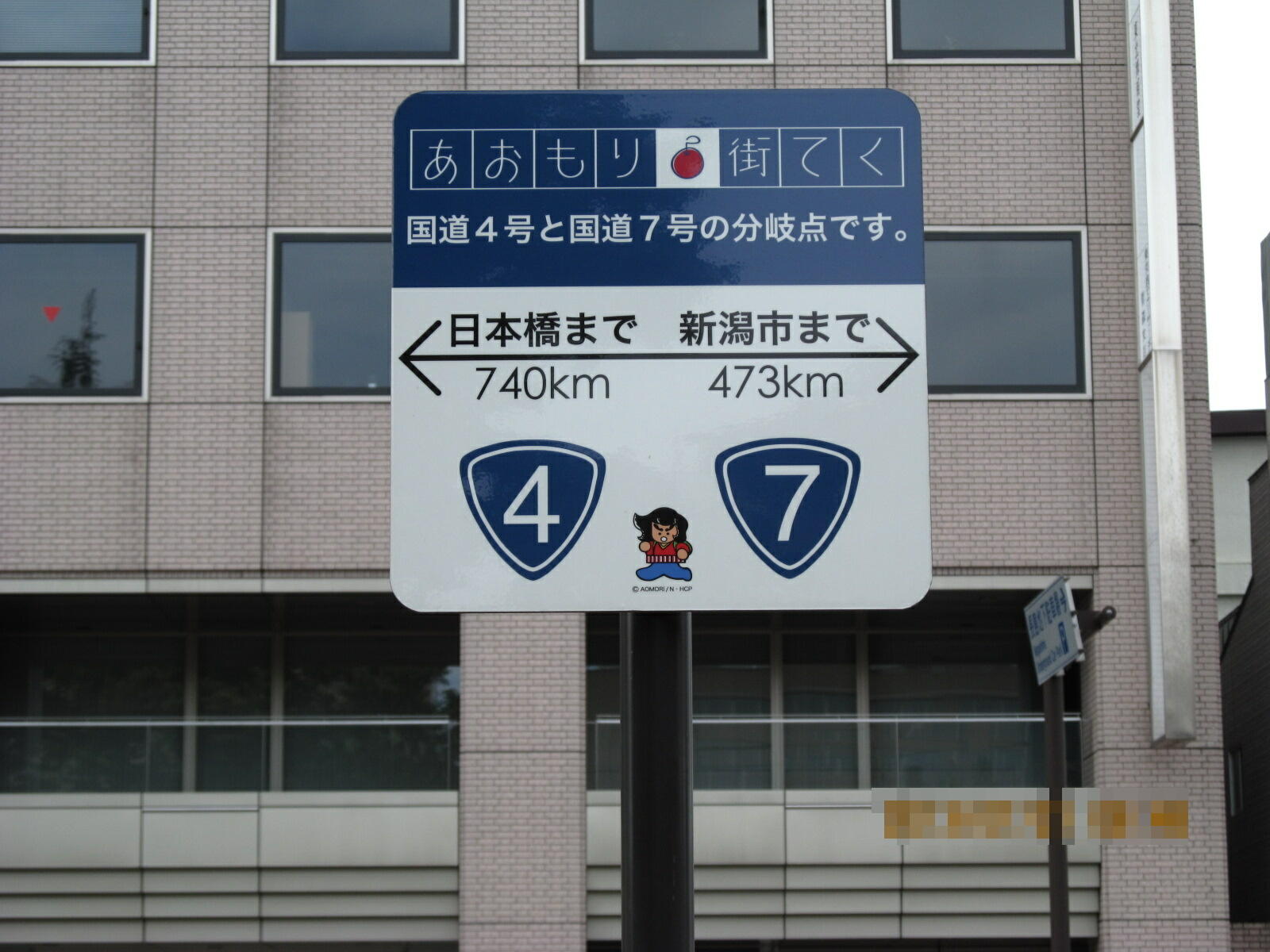
A sign marking the boundary between National Route 4 and National Route 7

From its western terminus at the mainline of National Route 7, the bypass makes its way east to the middle of Aomori. It first meets with a bypass of National Route 280, then it crosses under the tracks of the Hokkaido Shinkansen near Shin-Aomori Station. It is then carried by the Aomori Viaduct (993.8 meters or 3,260 feet) over the Tsugaru Line; this bridge is the third-longest in Aomori Prefecture. (Note: The longest is the 1,323.7-meter (4,343 ft) Hachinohe Ōhashi Bridge, and the second-longest is the 1,219-meter (3,999 ft) Aomori Bay Bridge.) The bypass meets the southern terminus of National Route 280 at the east end of the viaduct. It then crosses over the Ōu Main Line and Aoimori Railway Line near Aomori Station meeting its end shortly after at the northern terminus of National Route 4. National Route 4 continues along the same roadway south towards Tokyo.

== Major intersections ==
Location	km	mi	Destinations	Notes
Aomori	7.8	4.8	National Route 4 / National Route 45 south – to Noheji, Towada, Morioka	Eastern terminus; highway continues as National Routes 4 and 45 and Aomori Prefecture Route 120
Aomori	7.6	4.7	Aomori Prefecture Route 120 north	Southern end of Aomori Prefecture Route 120 concurrency
Aomori	7.4	4.6	Aomori Prefecture Route 44 east (Aomori-Nonai Loop Road)	
Aomori	6.9	4.3	National Route 280 north	
Aomori	6.4	4.0	Aomori Prefecture Route 247 west	Interchange
Aomori	3.4	2.1	National Route 280 north (Yomogita Bypass)	
Aomori	2.4	1.5	Aomori Prefecture Route 234	Interchange
Aomori	0.0	0.0	National Route 7 north (Aomori Belt Highway) – to Aomori Airport, Tōhoku Expressway, Towada, Noheji, Lake Towada	Western terminus; highway continues as National Routes 7 and 101
1.000 mi = 1.609 km; 1.000 km = 0.621 mi: Concurrency terminus; Route transition
