= Michinoku Toll Road =

Toll road in Aomori Prefecture, Japan

Michinoku Toll Road
- みちのく有料道路 (Michinoku Yūryōdōro)

Route information
- Maintained by Aomori Prefecture Road Corporation
- Length: 21.52 km (13.37 mi)
- Existed: November 13, 1980–present

Major junctions
- West end: Aomori. Aomori Prefecture Route 123 to the Aomori-higashi Interchange of Aomori Expressway
- East end: Shichinohe. Aomori Prefecture Route 242 to National Route 4

Location
- Country: Japan

Highway system
- National highways of Japan; Expressways of Japan

The Michinoku Toll Road (みちのく有料道路 Michinoku Yūryōdōro) is a two-lane toll road in Aomori Prefecture connecting the cities Aomori and Hachinohe via Shichinohe. It serves as an alternative to Japan National Route 4, bypassing the towns Hiranai and Noheji by cutting directly through the Hakkōda Mountains and other mountains of the northern Ōu Mountain Range. The road is managed by the Aomori Prefecture Road Corporation and is numbered E4A as an extension of the Tōhoku Expressway.

== Tolls ==
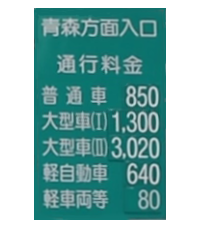
List of Tolls for Michinoku Toll Road

The toll gate for the Michinoku Toll Road does not accept ETC payment. The tolls are set to expire in 2029.

- Standard-sized car: ¥850
- Large vehicles with 4 axles or less: ¥1300
- Large vehicles with 5 or more axles: ¥3020
- Kei car: ¥640
- Light vehicles, etc.: ¥80

== Route description ==
From Aomori, the Michinoku Toll Road begins 2 kilometers east of the Aomori-higashi Interchange. The connection between the two routes is made by Aomori Prefecture Route 123, which makes its way north to Hiranai at the beginning of the Michinoku Toll Road. The speed limit for the toll road is 60 km/h. As it ascends into the Hakkoda Mountains heading east, going through a short tunnel. Just ahead of the tunnel is the road's toll booth. There are two gates servicing traffic in each direction. After the booth, the route continues ascending until it reaches the 3 kilometer long Michinoku Tunnel at 875 feet above sea level. This tunnel parallels the Hakkōda Tunnel, the longest double-tracked, single-tube terrestrial railway tunnel in the world. In the tunnel, the speed limit drops to 50 km/h and vehicles under 50cc are not allowed use it. At the halfway point of the tunnel drivers cross from Aomori to Schichinohe. After the tunnel the road crosses over and meets Aomori Prefecture Route 242. This road can be used to bypass the toll gate, albeit by meandering through the mountains on a gravel road and are seldom used due to the difficulty to pass through. Heading east Aomori Route 242 runs concurrent or parallel to the toll road. However, these parallel roads are hardly used at the moment, and there are places where it is extremely difficult to pass through. From the tunnel onward, the route descends from the mountains making its way to its end at a red bridge over the Shichinohe River. The road continues from here solely as Aomori Route 242 to National Route 4.

== History ==
The Michinoku Toll Road opened on November 13, 1980 at a cost of ¥21 billion. Before the opening of the Sakanashi Tunnel on the Tōhoku Expressway in 1986, the toll road was utilized the main expressway route connecting Aomori and Morioka. There was a rest stop near the toll gate, but it was removed in 2009. On January 19, 2010 it was decided to extended the tolling period until 2029 due to issues paying off debts incurred. From February 1 to 2, 2012, the road was made free to through traffic from Aomori to Shichinohe because of heavy snowfall along National Route 4 in Hiranai and Noheji.

== Future ==
The Michinoku Toll Road will meet the Kamikita Expressway at National Route 4 in Shichinohe. This will give direct access to the Daini-Michinoku Toll Road, and the Hachinohe Expressway as a single highway connecting the Hachinohe and Aomori Expressways. There are no plans yet to upgrade the connection between the Michinoku Toll Road and Aomori Expressway. However, the highway will function as a single extension of the Tōhoku Expressway with sections managed by both the Aomori Prefecture Road Corporation and East Nippon Expressway Company based on who built them.

== Junction list ==
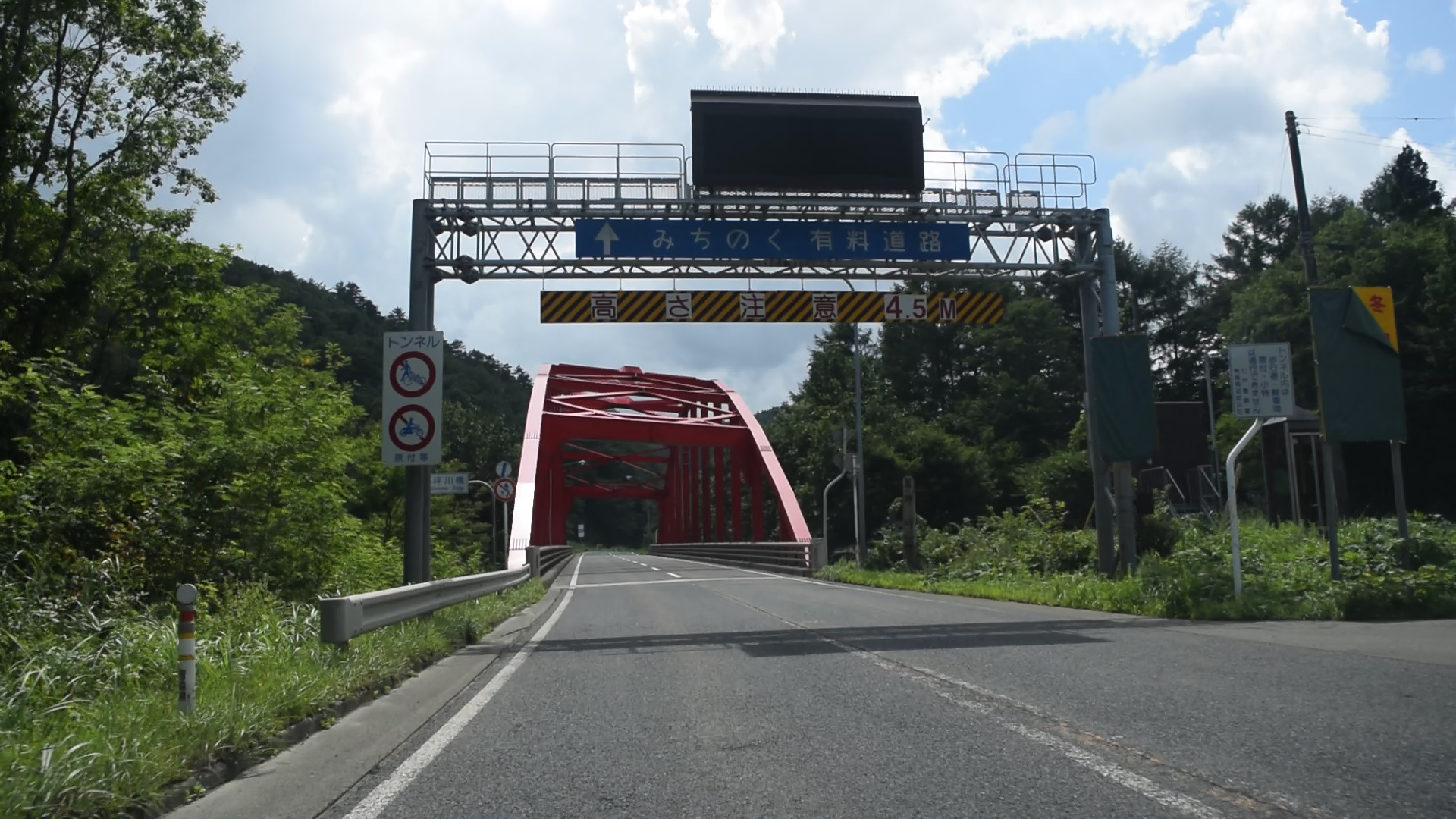
The eastern entrance to Michinoku Toll Road at the Shin Tsubokawa Bridge.

The entire toll road is in Aomori Prefecture.

Location	km	mi	Exit	Name	Destinations	Notes
Aomori	0	0.0	56	Aomori-higashi	Aomori Expressway– Aomori-chūō, Morioka	West terminus of the toll road. Aomori Prefecture Route 123 continues west to Aomori-higashi IC and National Route 4
Shichinohe	16.5	10.3	—	Aomori-Takisawa	Aomori Prefecture Route 242 – to National Route 103 / National Route 394; Hakkōda Mountains	If Route 242 is used driving west on the toll road, no tolls are required. However, the road is not paved.
Shichinohe	21.5	13.4	—	—	Aomori Prefecture Route 242 – to National Route 4	East terminus of the toll road at the Shin Tsubokawa Bridge crossing over the Shichinohe River. Aomori Prefecture Route 242 continues east to National Route 4.
Shichinohe	27	17	—	Tenmabayashi	National Route 279 / Kamikita Expressway (Shimokita Expressway) – to Hachinohe, Mutsu	Under construction as of February 2019.
1.000 mi = 1.609 km; 1.000 km = 0.621 mi: Incomplete access; Unopened

== See also ==
- Aomori Expressway
- Kamikita Expressway
- Daini-Michinoku Toll Road
- Hachinohe Expressway
- Tōhoku Expressway
