= Tsugaru Expressway =

Expressway in Aomori Prefecture, Japan

Tsugaru Expressway
- 津軽自動車道

Route information
- Maintained by Ministry of Land, Infrastructure, Transport and Tourism
- Length: 19.5 km (12.1 mi)
- Existed: 2002–present
- Component highways: National Route 101

Major junctions
- West end: Namioka Interchange; National Route 7 / Tōhoku Expressway in Aomori, Aomori
- Goshogawara-kita Interchange; National Route 339 in Goshogawara, Aomori

Section 1
- East end: Tsugaru Kashiwa Interchange; National Route 101 in Tsugaru, Aomori

Ajigasawa Section
- Length: 3.4 km (2.1 mi)
- West end: Melon Road in Ajigasawa, Aomori
- East end: Ajigasawa Interchange; National Route 101 in Ajigasawa, Aomori

Location
- Country: Japan

Highway system
- National highways of Japan; Expressways of Japan

The Tsugaru Expressway (津軽自動車道, Tsugaru Jidōsha-dō) is a two-lane national expressway in Aomori Prefecture, Japan. The expressway connects the prefecture's capital, Aomori, and the Tōhoku Expressway to the municipalities of Goshogawara, Tsugaru and, Ajigasawa. It is owned and operated by Ministry of Land, Infrastructure, Transport and Tourism and is signed as an auxiliary route of National Route 101 as well as E64 under their "2016 Proposal for Realization of Expressway Numbering."

== Route description ==
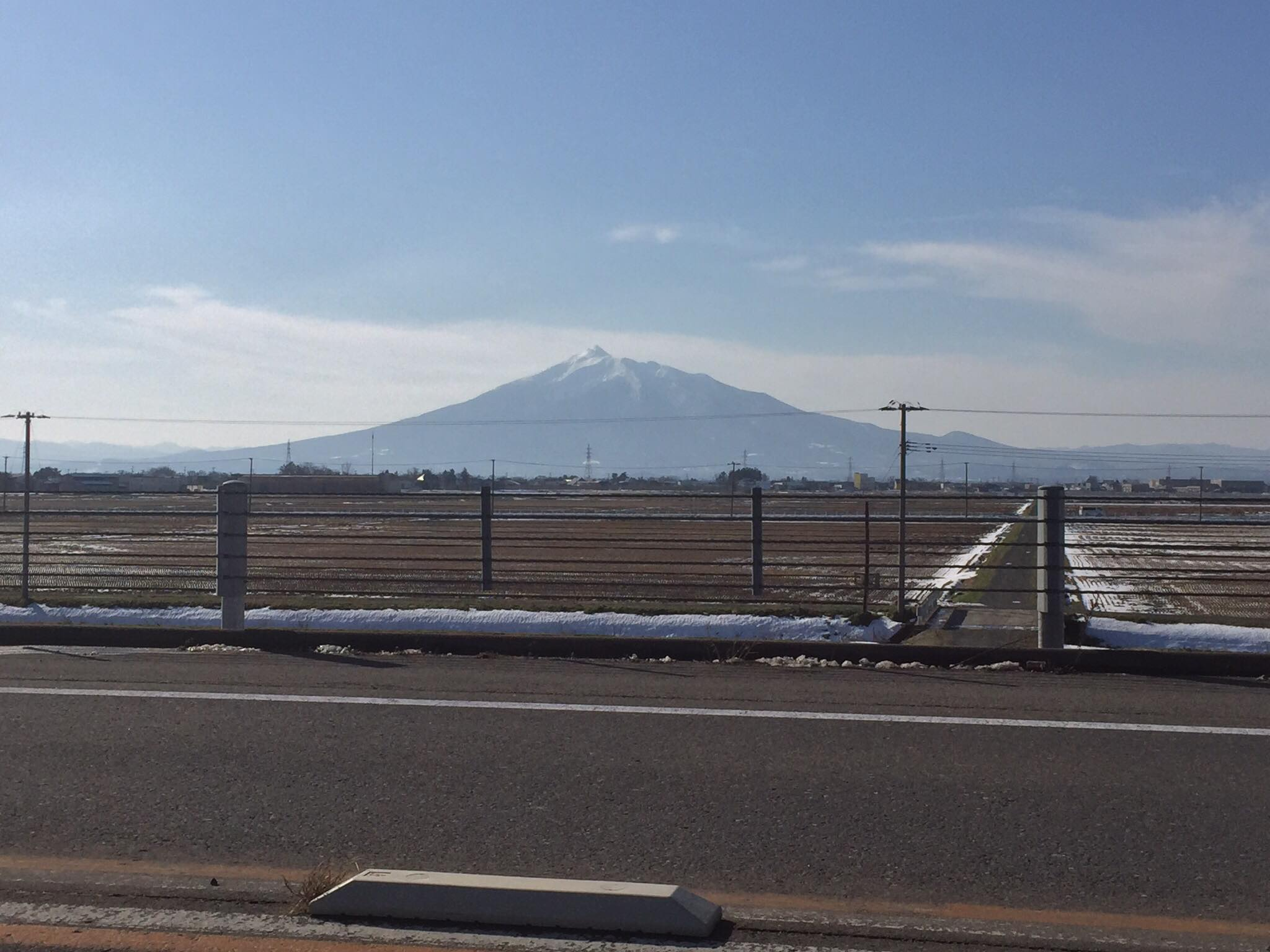
Mount Iwaki from the Tsugaru Expressway

The expressway's eastern terminus lies near the Namioka Interchange of the Tōhoku Expressway. A signaled intersection along National Route 7 separates the entrance to the Tōhoku Expressway from the Tsugaru Expressway. From this intersection, the expressway follows a northwestern heading out of the city limits of Aomori into Goshogawara. The expressway serves as a high-speed alternate to the main National Route 101 from National Route 7 to Goshogawara. When the expressway meets National Route 101, it instead serves as a bypass to the city, curving around heading north, west, and then south to meet its western terminus at another junction with National Route 101.

The speed limit is 70 km/h for the entire route; however, during the winter the speed limit is reduced to 60 km/h.

=== Ajigasawa section ===
About 13 kilometers (8.1 mi) further west along National Route 101 in Ajigasawa, a 3.4 kilometres (2.1 mi) section of the expressway was partially completed in 2016 and expanded in 2019. Its eastern end lies just outside of Ajigasawa in Tsugaru at an intersection with Route 101. The expressway segment has a single junction with Aomori Prefecture Route 31 and a crossing over the Narusawa River before it meets its end at Route 101 once more.

== History ==
On 8 August 1989, planning began on the route from the Namioka bypass to Goshogawara. Construction began on the expressway in 1994. The first section of the expressway opened to traffic between Goshogawara-higashi and the Namioka bypass in 2002. Another section of the expressway opened to traffic between Goshogawara-higashi and Goshogawara-kita on 14 December 2007. The third section of the expressway opened to traffic between Goshogawara-kita and Tsugaru Kashiwa on 3 November 2014. On 17 March 2015 the maximum speed was increased to 70 km/h. On 30 July 2016 the Ajigasawa section opened to traffic with a temporary at-grade junction with Melon Road. This junction was replaced with a bridge on 26 March 2019 and the section was extended east to end at a junction with National Route 101.

== Future ==
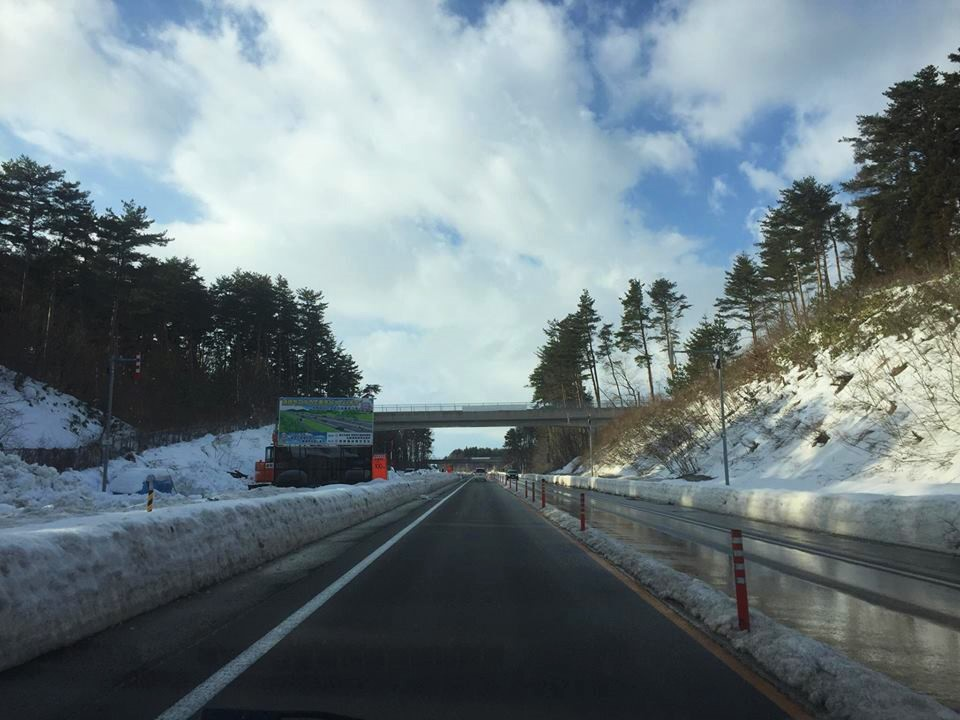
Tsugaru Expressway widening project

The expressway is being widened within the city of Aomori from two lanes to four.

Plans are in progress for the construction of an expressway linking the Ajigasawa section to the rest of the Tsugaru Expressway along the 13-kilometer (8.1 mi) long gap. The route would parallel Route 101 from the north until just before the route would meet the Ajigasawa section where it would cross the road, paralleling it from the south. This expressway is planned to be extended south through Fukaura, Aomori to Happō in Akita Prefecture.

== Junction list ==
Prefecture	Location	km	mi	Exit	Name	Destinations	Notes
Aomori	Aomori			53	Namioka	Tōhoku Expressway – Aomori, Morioka	Under construction
Aomori	Aomori	0	0.0	—	Kosokudo	National Route 7 (Namioka Bypass) – Hirosaki, Aomori	At-grade junction, current eastern terminus of the expressway
Aomori	Goshogawara	7.6	4.7	—	Goshogawara-higashi	National Route 101 – Central Goshogawara, Aomori	
Aomori	Goshogawara	11.4	7.1	—	Goshogawara	Horogake Matsunoki Road – to Aomori Prefecture Route 156, Central Goshogawara, Kaneyama	
Aomori	Goshogawara	15.7	9.8	—	Goshogawara-kita	National Route 339 – Central Goshogawara, Nakadomari, Cape Tappi	
Aomori	Tsugaru	19.5	12.1	—	Tsugaru Kashiwa	National Route 101 (Omagoe Highway) – Goshogawara, Ajigasawa	At-grade junction
13 km gap in the expressway, connection is made by National Route 101
Aomori	Tsugaru	0	0.0	—	Ukita	National Route 101– Goshogawara, Ajigasawa	At-grade junction, current eastern terminus of the expressway segment.
Aomori	Ajigasawa	0.3	0.19	—	(no name)	Melon Road	Closed at-grade junction, former eastern terminus of the expressway segment.
Aomori	Ajigasawa	2.5	1.6	—	Minami-Ukida	Aomori Prefecture Route 31	
Aomori	Ajigasawa	3.7	2.3	—	Ajigasawa	National Route 101	At-grade junction, current western terminus of the expressway.
Akita	Happō			—	—	—	Proposed extension
1.000 mi = 1.609 km; 1.000 km = 0.621 mi: Closed/former; Incomplete access; Unopened

== See also ==
- Japan National Route 101
