= Japan National Route 101 =

National highway in Japan

National Route 101
- 国道101号
- National Route 101 highlighted in red

Route information
- Length: 241.6 km (150.1 mi)
- Existed: 18 May 1953–present

Major junctions
- North end: National Route 4 / National Route 45 in Aomori, Aomori
- National Route 7; National Route 280; National Route 339
- South end: National Route 7 / National Route 13 in Akita, Akita

Location
- Country: Japan

Highway system
- National highways of Japan; Expressways of Japan
← National Route 58	→ National Route 102

National Route 101 (国道101号, Kokudō Hyakuichigō) is a national highway of Japan connecting the capitals of Aomori and Akita prefectures, Aomori and Akita in northern Japan, with a total length of 241.6 kilometers (150.1 mi). The majority of the highway travels along the coast of the Sea of Japan, paralleling the more inland National Route 7. The present-day highway largely follows the path of the Ōmagoe-kaidō, an Edo period road that linked the Kubota and Hirosaki feudal domains.

== Route description ==
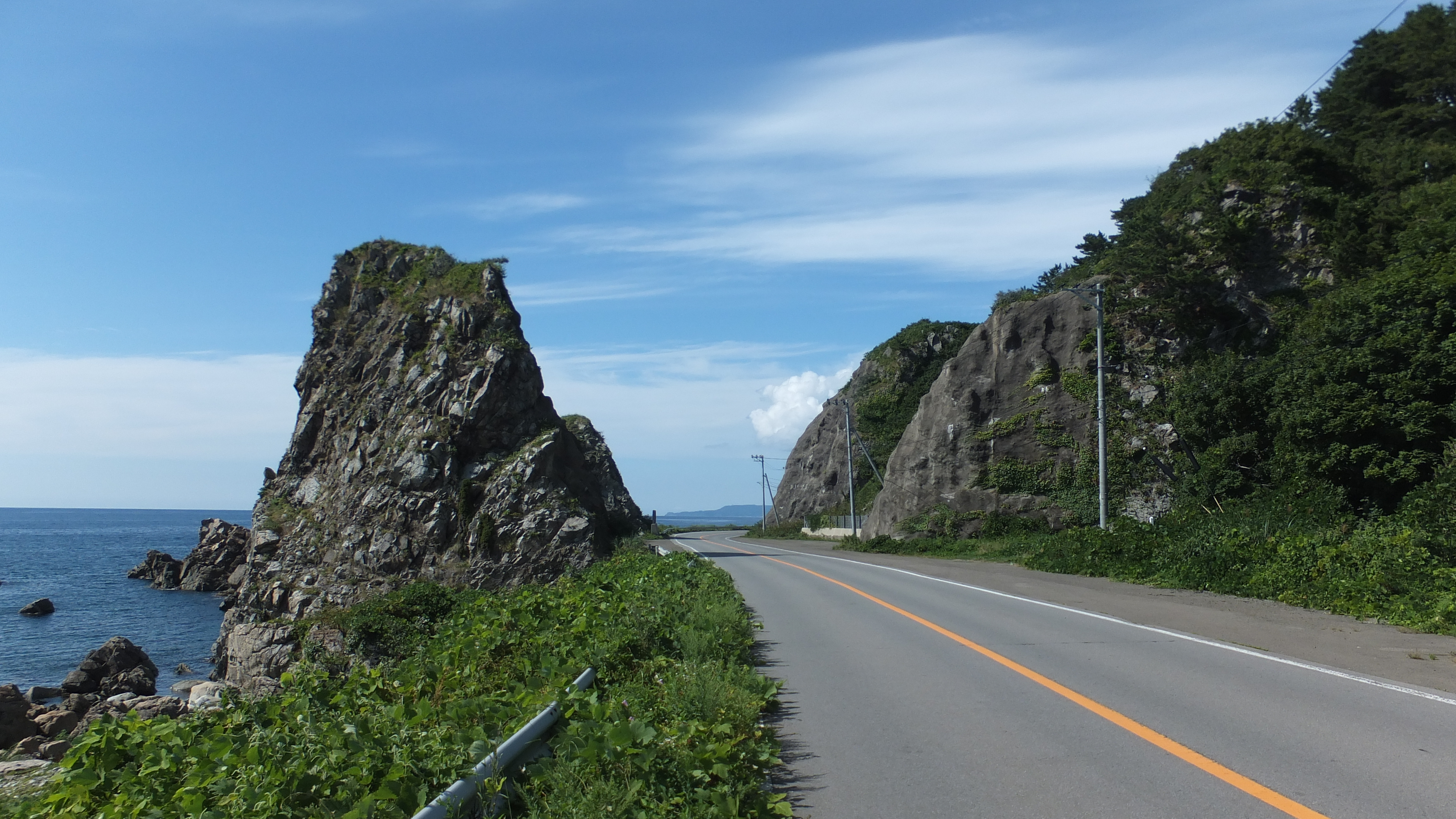
National Route 101 along the Sea of Japan coast in Fukaura, Aomori.

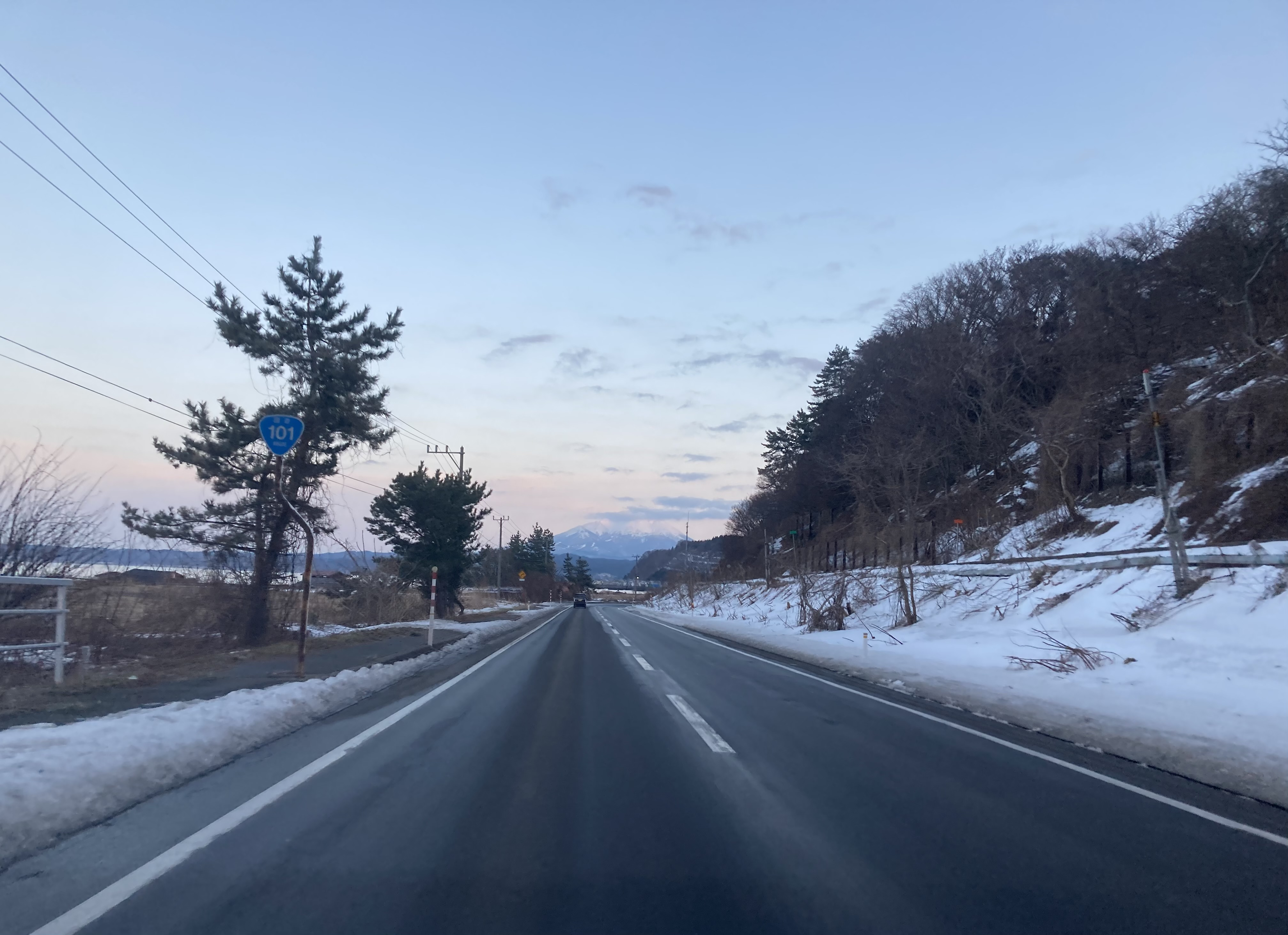
Twilight along National Route 101 with Mount Iwaki in the background

National Route 101 begins in central Aomori at the northern terminus of National Route 7 in front of Aoimori Park. The two national highways run parallel or concurrently all the way from Aomori to National Route 101's southern terminus in the city of Akita; however in the former town of Namioka, National Route 101 leaves National Route 7. It heads west, passing through the cities of Goshogawara and Tsugaru, until it meets the Sea of Japan coastline in the town of Ajigasawa. From there it travels along the western coast of Aomori and Akita prefectures, paralleling the more inland National Route 7. Overall, the highway has a total length of 241.6 kilometers (150.1 mi).

The JR Gonō Line closely parallels the highway for much of its route. Also known as the Ōmagoe-kaidō, there are several attractions along the winding coastal portion of the highway including Furofushi Onsen and the World Heritage Site, Shirakami-Sanchi around the border between Aomori and Akita prefectures. The registration of Shirakami-Sanchi as a World Heritage Site in 1993 has since resulted in an increase in the average daily traffic levels along the highway.

== History ==
Much of what is presently National Route 101 was preceded by the Ōmagoe-kaidō (大間越街道), a road established by the Tokugawa shogunate during the Edo period as a branch of the longer Ushū Kaidō (now known as national routes 7 and 13). It traveled between Hiyama-shukuba on the Ushū Kaidō in present-day Noshiro through the Kubota Domain to Hirosaki Castle in the Hirosaki Domain. A gate was set up between the two domains in 1618 to collect tolls and exchange goods. The highway was dubbed the Ōmagoe-kaidō during the Meiji period when the gate between the domains was abolished.

National Route 101 was established by the Cabinet of Japan between the city of Aomori and Noshiro, Akita in 1953 along pre-existing roads including most of the Ōmagoe-kaidō. By 1965, National Route 101 was certified to have been completed by the national government; however, in 1967 a 20.7-kilometer-long (12.9 mi) section of the highway at the border between Aomori and Akita prefectures was deemed to be to curvy and dangerous. The Noshiro Construction Office rebuilt the section with full funding from the national government. Upon the completion of the renovated section in March 1975, the highway's maintenance was handed back over to regional authorities. The highway and National Route 339 were routed along one-way streets in central Goshogawara from August 1977 to 30 August 1989, when the restrictions were lifted. In 1993, the southern terminus of the highway was moved further south from Noshiro to its current location in the city of Akita.

=== Incidents and closures ===
On 8 June 2018, Oibanasaki Tunnel in Oga, Akita was closed because the risk of a landslide was deemed too high following the collapse of a portion of the hillside adjacent to the entrance of the tunnel during heavy rains in May. The tunnel was reopened on 15 December 2020 following the completion of work to reinforce the tunnel as well as the slope alongside the tunnel entrance.

On 22 September 2018, a drunk driver that was traveling on the highway in the city of Tsugaru at a speed of 163 kilometers per hour (101 mph) caused an incident that involved four cars. As a result of the incident, four people were killed and three were injured. The driver who caused the accident was given a 20-year prison sentence for vehicular homicide on 8 June 2020.

== Major intersections ==
Prefecture	Location	km	mi	Destinations	Notes
Aomori	Aomori	0.0	0.0	National Route 4 / National Route 45 south – to Noheji, Towada, Morioka	Northern terminus; northern end of National Route 7 concurrency (National Route 101 is unsigned)
Aomori	Aomori	0.2	0.12	Aomori Prefecture Route 120 north	Southern end of Aomori Route 120 concurrency
Aomori	Aomori	0.4	0.25	Aomori Prefecture Route 44 east (Aomori–Nonai Loop Road)	
Aomori	Aomori	0.9	0.56	National Route 280 north	
Aomori	Aomori	1.4	0.87	Aomori Prefecture Route 247 west	Interchange
Aomori	Aomori	4.4	2.7	National Route 280 north (Yomogita Bypass)	
Aomori	Aomori	5.4	3.4	Aomori Prefecture Route 234	Interchange
Aomori	Aomori	7.5	4.7	National Route 7 north (Aomori Belt Highway) – to Towada, Noheji, Lake Towada, Aomori Airport, Tōhoku Expressway	
Aomori	Aomori	9.3	5.8	Aomori Prefecture Route 247	
Aomori	Aomori	14.9	9.3	Aomori Prefecture Route 247 east	
Aomori	Aomori	16.6	10.3	National Route 7	Southern end of National Route 7 concurrency
Aomori	Aomori	18.3	11.4	Aomori Prefecture Route 285 south	
Aomori	Aomori	18.8	11.7	National Route 7	
Aomori	Aomori	19.5	12.1	Aomori Prefecture Route 231 east	
Aomori	Goshogawara	21.7	13.5	Aomori Prefecture Route 35 south	
Aomori	Goshogawara	24.8	15.4	Aomori Prefecture Route 34 south	
Aomori	Goshogawara	25.5	15.8	Aomori Prefecture Route 36 north	
Aomori	Goshogawara	27.2	16.9	Tsugaru Expressway – to Aomori, Hirosaki, Nakadomari, Cape Tappi	Goshogawara-higashi Interchange
Aomori	Goshogawara	27.4	17.0	Aomori Prefecture Route 156 north	
Aomori	Goshogawara	29.4	18.3	Aomori Prefecture Route 38 south	
Aomori	Goshogawara	31.8	19.8	National Route 339 (Goshogawara-kita Bypass)	
Aomori	Goshogawara	32.7	20.3	National Route 339	
Aomori	Goshogawara	33.1	20.6	Aomori Prefecture Route 154 west / Aomori Prefecture Route 156 east	
Aomori	Goshogawara	34.2	21.3	Aomori Prefecture Route 151 north	
Aomori	Goshogawara	35.2	21.9	Aomori Prefecture Route 43 north	
Aomori	Tsugaru	36.1	22.4	Tsugaru Expressway east – to Aomori, Tōhoku Expressway	Tsugaru Kashiwa Interchange
Aomori	Tsugaru	36.7	22.8	Aomori Prefecture Route 245 west	
Aomori	Tsugaru	38.0	23.6	Aomori Prefecture Route 37 south / Aomori Prefecture Route 241 north	
Aomori	Tsugaru	39.7	24.7	Aomori Prefecture Route 186	
Aomori	Tsugaru	42.0	26.1	Aomori Prefecture Route 245 east / Aomori Prefecture Route 267 west	
Aomori	Tsugaru	44.1	27.4	Aomori Prefecture Route 188	
Aomori	Tsugaru	45.3	28.1	Aomori Prefecture Route 39 south	
Aomori	Tsugaru	47.5	29.5	Aomori Prefecture Route 12 north	
Aomori	Tsugaru	49.0	30.4	Tsugaru Expressway west – Hirosaki, Shichirinagahama Port	
Aomori	Ajigasawa	49.4	30.7	Aomori Prefecture Route 267 east	
Aomori	Ajigasawa	52.6	32.7	Aomori Prefecture Route 31 south	
Aomori	Ajigasawa	53.3	33.1	Tsugaru Expressway east – Goshogawara, Tsugaru	Current western terminus of the Tsugaru Expressway
Aomori	Ajigasawa	55.5	34.5	Aomori Prefecture Route 3	
Aomori	Ajigasawa	60.1	37.3	Aomori Prefecture Route 3 east	
Aomori	Fukaura	65.0	40.4	Aomori Prefecture Route 191 south	
Aomori	Fukaura	93.9	58.3	Aomori Prefecture Route 192 south	
Aomori	Fukaura	107.3	66.7	Aomori Prefecture Route 192 north	
Aomori	Fukaura	108.5	67.4	Aomori Prefecture Route 28 east	
Aomori	Fukaura	112.2	69.7	Aomori Prefecture Route 280 east	
Akita	Happō	134.1	83.3	Akita Prefecture Route 154 south	
Akita	Happō	137.9	85.7	Akita Prefecture Route 154 north	
Akita	Happō	142.3	88.4	Akita Prefecture Route 63 south	
Akita	Noshiro	150.6	93.6	Akita Prefecture Route 209 north	
Akita	Noshiro	152.8	94.9	Akita Prefecture Route 143 east	
Akita	Noshiro	157.6	97.9	National Route 7 north	Northern end of National Route 7 concurrency
Akita	Noshiro	162.2	100.8	Akita Expressway – to Ōdate, Aomori, Akita, Kitakami	Continuous green T interchange; Akita Expressway exit 13 (Noshiro-minami Interchange)
Akita	Mitane	166.9	103.7	Akita Expressway – to Noshiro, Ōdate, Akita, Kitakami	Continuous green T interchange; Akita Expressway exit 12 (Hachiryū Interchange)
Akita	Mitane	167.9	104.3	National Route 7 south	Southern end of National Route 7 concurrency
Akita	Mitane	169.3	105.2	Akita Prefecture Route 42 south	
Akita	Oga	190.5	118.4	Akita Prefecture Route 304 east	
Akita	Oga	195.7	121.6	Akita Prefecture Route 55 west	Northern end of Akita Prefecture Route 55 concurrency
Akita	Oga	199.2	123.8	Akita Prefecture Route 55 east	Southern end of Akita Prefecture Route 55 concurrency
Akita	Oga	204.6	127.1	Akita Prefecture Route 59	
Akita	Oga	208.0	129.2	Akita Prefecture Route 226	
Akita	Oga	210.4	130.7	Akita Prefecture Route 42 north	
Akita	Oga	212.0	131.7	Akita Prefecture Route 159 north	
Akita	Katagami	219.2	136.2	Akita Prefecture Route 56 south	
Akita	Akita	224.7	139.6	National Route 7 north – Noshiro; Akita Expressway – Akita, Kitakami, Noshiro, Ōdate	Northern end of National Route 7 concurrency; Continuous green T interchange; Akita Expressway exit 9 (Shōwa-Ogahantō Interchange)
Akita	Katagami	225.2	139.9	Akita Prefecture Route 41 south	
Akita	Katagami	229.4	142.5	Akita Prefecture Route 124 east	
Akita	Akita	234.1	145.5	Akita Prefecture Route 112 north	
Akita	Akita	234.3	145.6	Akita Prefecture Route 56 north (Ohama Street)	Northern end of Akita Prefecture Route 56 concurrency
Akita	Akita	235.8	146.5	Akita Prefecture Route 231 east	
Akita	Akita	237.5	147.6	Akita Prefecture Route 56 south	Southern end of Akita Prefecture Route 56 concurrency
Akita	Akita	240.1	149.2	Akita Prefecture Route 65 south	
Akita	Akita	241.6	150.1	National Route 7 south / National Route 13 south / Akita Prefecture Route 26 east – to Yokote, Daisen, Sakata, Yamagata, Yurihonjō, Akita Station	Southern terminus; southern end of National Route 7 concurrency
1.000 mi = 1.609 km; 1.000 km = 0.621 mi: Concurrency terminus

== Auxiliary routes ==
=== Tsugaru Expressway ===
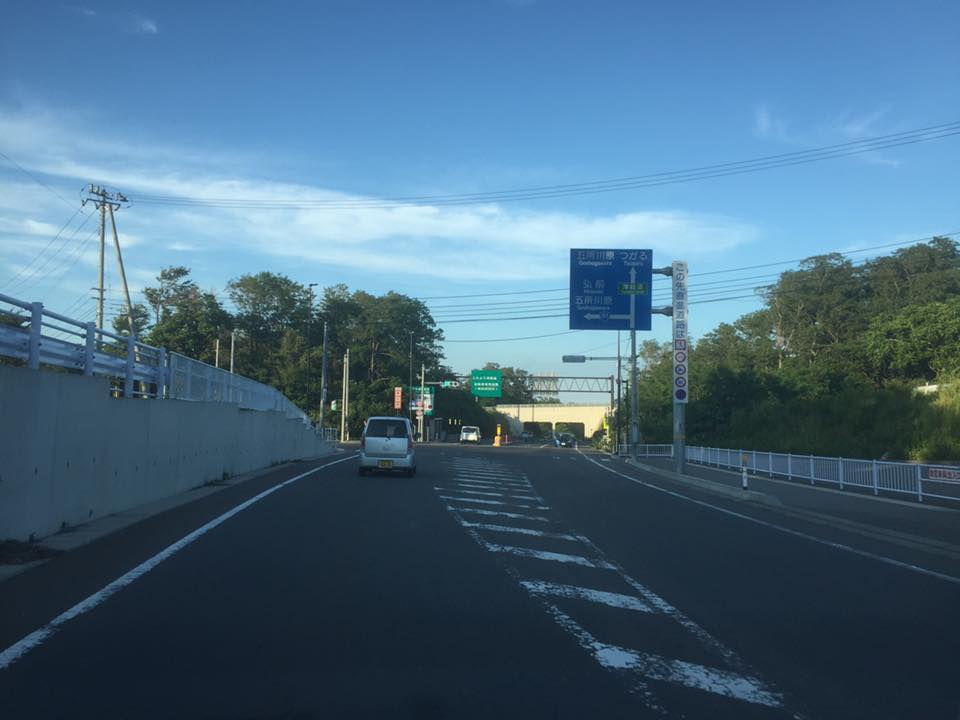
The western terminus of the Tsugaru Expressway in Ajigasawa.

The Tsugaru Expressway is an incomplete two-lane national expressway in Aomori Prefecture that is signed as an auxiliary route of National Route 101. Its first section was established in 2002 and the expressway has been extended in stages since then. The expressway travels west from Aomori through the cities of Goshogawara and Tsugaru, where the main section of the expressway currently ends at an interchange with the main routing of National Route 101. A short expressway stub opened in Ajigasawa in 2016. The expressway is planned to be extended south through Fukaura to Happō in Akita Prefecture.
