= Aomori-higashi Interchange =

- 青森東インターチェンジ Aomori-higashi Intāchenji
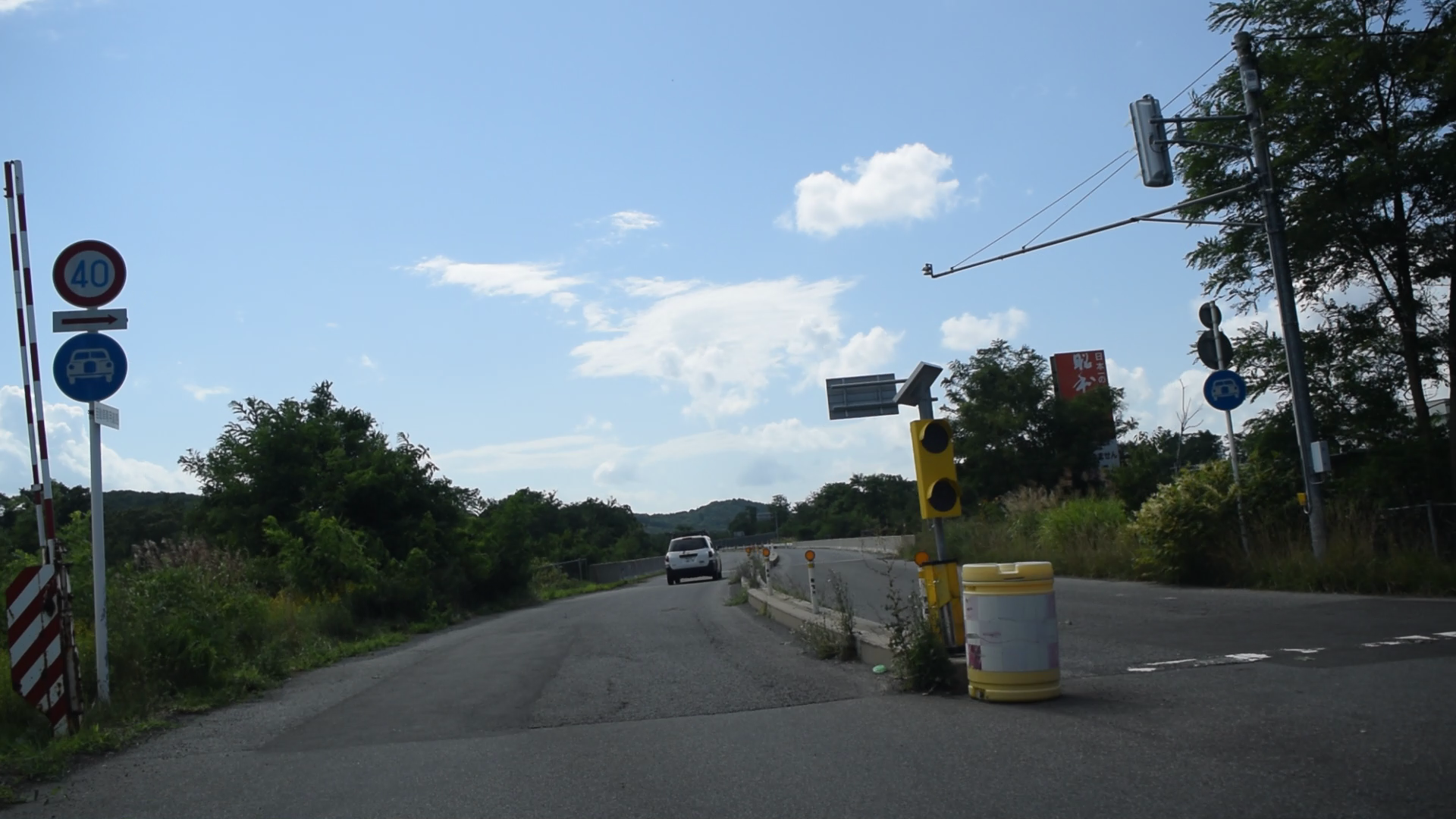
- Eastern terminus of the Aomori Expressway at the Aomori-higashi Interchange
- Interactive map of Aomori-higashi Interchange

Location
- Aomori, Aomori 〒030-0933
- Coordinates: 40.830894°N 140.842699°E
- Roads at junction: Aomori Expressway Michinoku Toll Road

Construction
- Type: Expressway
- Lanes: 2
- Opened: September 24, 2003
- Maintained by: East Nippon Expressway Company
- Tolls: 440 yen for a regular size vehicle

The Aomori-higashi Interchange (青森東インターチェンジ, Aomori-higashi Intāchenji) is the eastern terminus of the Aomori Expressway, a two-lane national expressway in Aomori, Aomori Prefecture, Japan. It is owned and operated by East Nippon Expressway Company. There is no toll gate at the interchange; drivers pay to use the end of the expressway at the Aomori Chuo Toll Gate.
