= Aomori Expressway =

National expressway spur in Aomori, Aomori, Japan

Aomori Expressway
- 青森自動車道

Route information
- Length: 15.95 km (9.91 mi)
- Existed: 2003–present

Major junctions
- From: Aomori Interchange in Aomori, Aomori; Tōhoku Expressway
- To: Aomori-higashi Interchange in Aomori, Aomori; Michinoku Toll Road; Aomori Prefectural Route 47; Aomori Prefectural Route 123

Location
- Country: Japan

Highway system
- National highways of Japan; Expressways of Japan

The Aomori Expressway (青森自動車道, Aomori Jidōsha-dō) is a two-lane national expressway spur route in Aomori, Aomori Prefecture, Japan. It is owned and operated by East Nippon Expressway Company and is signed E4A as a direct extension and spur route of the Tōhoku Expressway.

== Route description ==
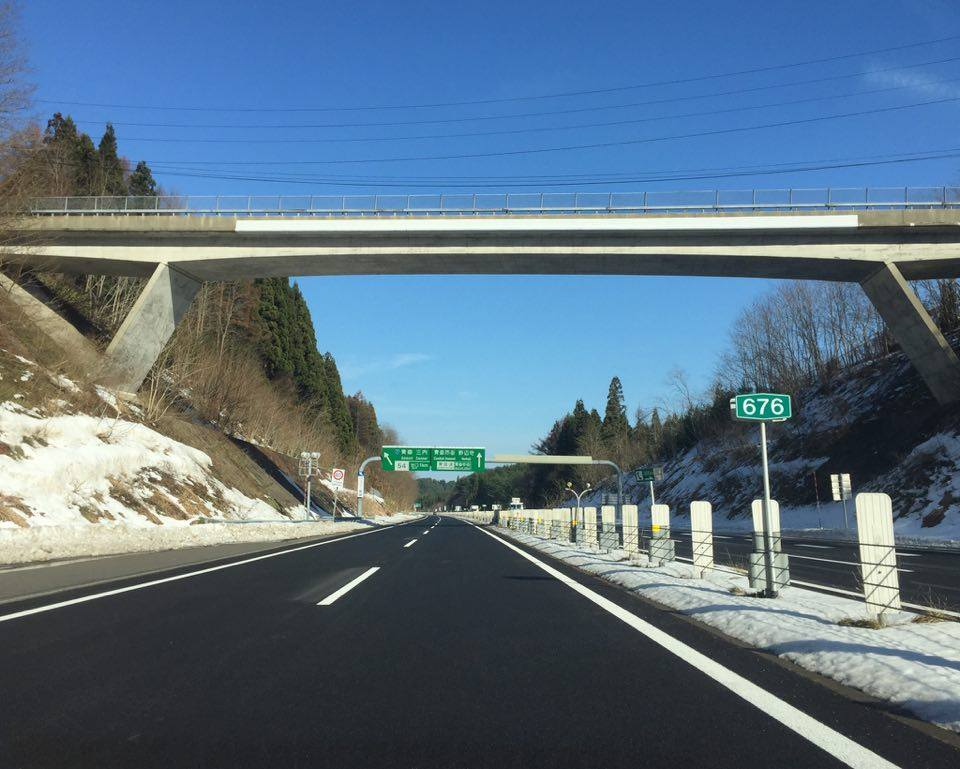
Aomori IC near the north end of the Tōhoku Expressway and the western terminus of the Aomori Expressway.

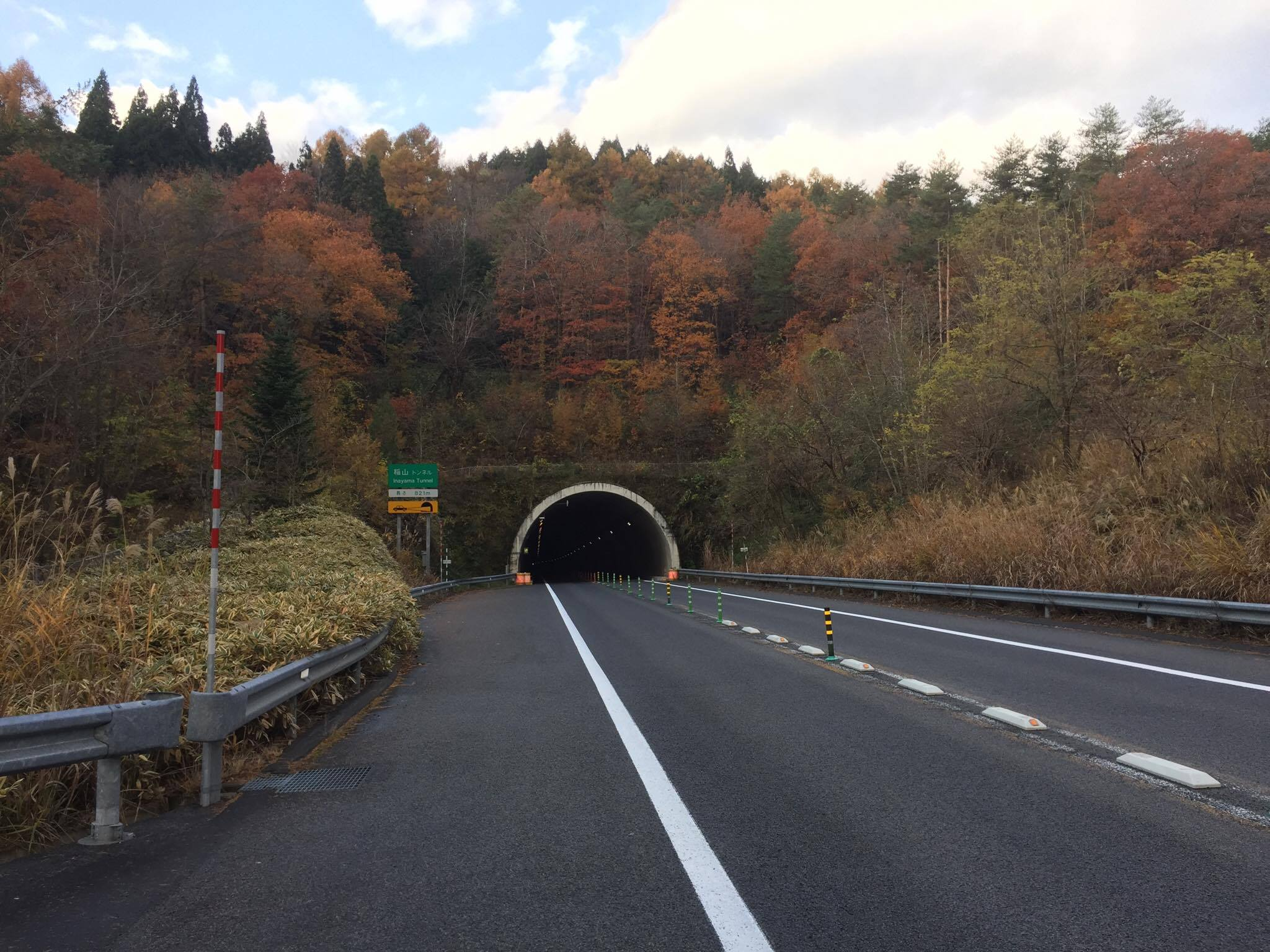
The Inayama Tunnel west of Aomori-higashi IC.

The expressway is officially referred to as the Tōhoku Jūkan Expressway Hachinohe Route.

The expressway serves as an extension to the Tōhoku Expressway (which terminates at Aomori Interchange) and runs through southern areas of the city of Aomori. From Aomori Interchange, it runs east, crossing under the tracks of the Tōhoku Shinkansen. Soon after the expressway meets the Aomori Belt Highway, a bypass of National Route 7, which serves for several kilometers from here as a frontage road to the expressway. Eventually, the two roads have are linked by the Aomori-chūō Interchange where tolls are collected for the entire expressway, including any tolls accrued from traveling from the Tōhoku Expressway. The expressway continues east and splits from National Route 7 before it comes to its end at Aomori-higashi Interchange near the western terminus of the Michinoku Toll Road.

The speed limit is 70 km/h for the entire route.

== History ==
Construction on Aomori Expressway began in 1999 and it was opened to traffic on 28 September 2003. The completion of the expressway reduced travel times from the Tōhoku Expressway to Central Aomori by 11 minutes and reduced congestion along the Aomori West Bypass.

== Future ==
Though the Aomori Expressway terminates at Aomori-higashi Interchange, it is planned to eventually connect with the northern terminus of the Hachinohe Expressway in the town of Oirase via a series of toll roads.

== Junction list ==
The expressway is a direct extension of the Tōhoku Expressway. Therefore, the distance and exit numbers continue from the sequence of the Tōhoku Expressway, starting at 677.26 kilometers (420.83 mi). The entire route is in Aomori Prefecture.

Location	km	mi	Exit	Name	Destinations	Notes
Through to Tōhoku Expressway
Aomori	677.26	420.83	54	Aomori	Tōhoku Expressway– Morioka, Tokyo	Access only from northbound E4 and to southbound E4.
Aomori	683.50	424.71	55/TB	Aomori-chūō	National Route 7 (Aomori Belt Highway)	Tolls are collected here for both Aomori-higashi IC and Aomori-chūō IC
Aomori	688.31	427.70	—	Emergency Exit	National Route 7 (Aomori Belt Highway)	Access for Aomori Chūō Hospital; Authorized vehicles only
Aomori	693.21	430.74	56	Aomori-higashi	Pref. Route 47 (Aomori-higashi Inter Route); Pref. Route 123 (Shimizugawa Takizawanonai Route)	At-grade junction E4A is to the right
Through to Michinoku Toll Road
1.000 mi = 1.609 km; 1.000 km = 0.621 mi: Incomplete access; Tolled
