= Aomori Interchange =

- 青森インターチェンジ Aomori Intāchenji
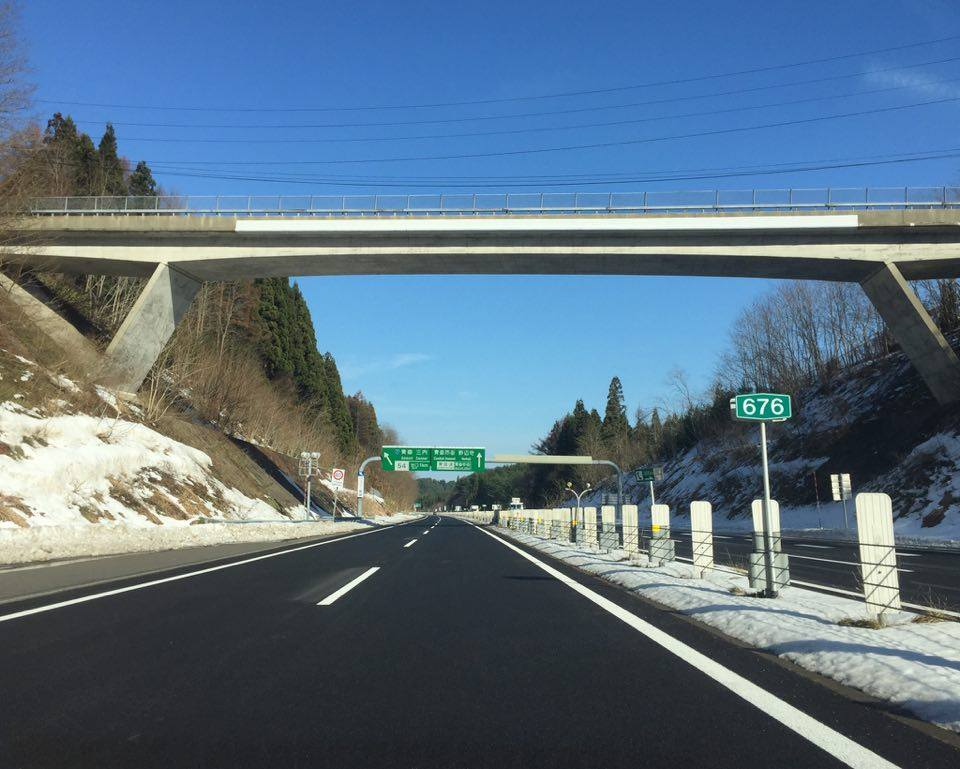
- Aomori IC near the north end of the Tōhoku Expressway.
- Interactive map of Aomori Interchange

Location
- Aomori, Aomori 〒038-0043
- Coordinates: 40.792666°N 140.671811°E
- Roads at junction: Tōhoku Expressway; Aomori Expressway; National Route 7

Construction
- Type: Expressway
- Lanes: 4
- Opened: September 27, 1979
- Maintained by: East Nippon Expressway Company

The Aomori Interchange (青森インターチェンジ, Aomori Intāchenji) is the northern terminus of the Tōhoku Expressway as well as the western terminus of the Aomori Expressway, a two-lane national expressway in Aomori, Aomori Prefecture, Japan. It is owned and operated by East Nippon Expressway Company. The Aomori Interchange is the northern terminus of a continuous series of expressways that links Honshu and Kyushu, with a total 2,170 kilometers of expressway to Kagoshima Interchange in Kagoshima.

== Overview ==
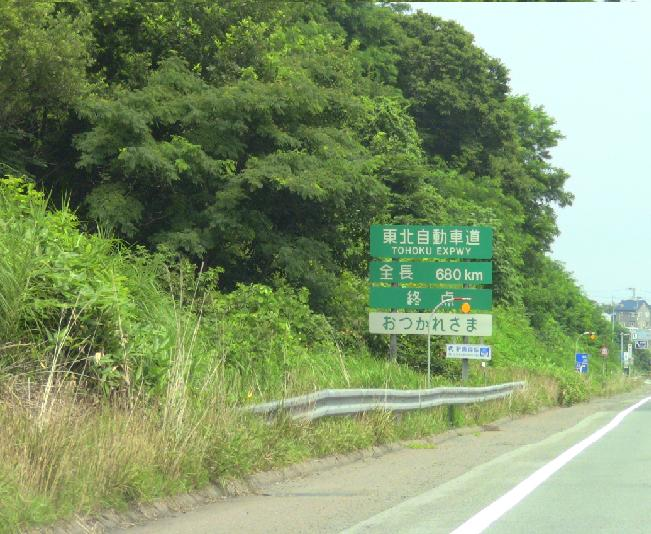
The Aomori Interchange marks the end of the Tōhoku Expressway

The Aomori Interchange is made up of two road junctions. Approaching from the south, the Tōhoku Expressway forks to the left while the Aomori Expressway forks to the right. From here, the Tōhoku Expressway continues northeast to a final toll plaza. The plaza has five gates for traffic heading towards the northern terminus; one gate of which is electronically collected, and three gates for southbound traffic; one of which is electronically collected as well. After passing through the plaza, the expressway reaches its northern terminus at a trumpet interchange with the Aomori Belt Highway (National Route 7). When traveling south, there is no access to the Aomori Expressway, instead westbound traffic from Aomori Expressway merges into the Tōhoku Expressway's southbound traffic.
