= Aomori Airport =

Airport in Aomori, Aomori Prefecture, Japan

Aomori Airport 青森空港

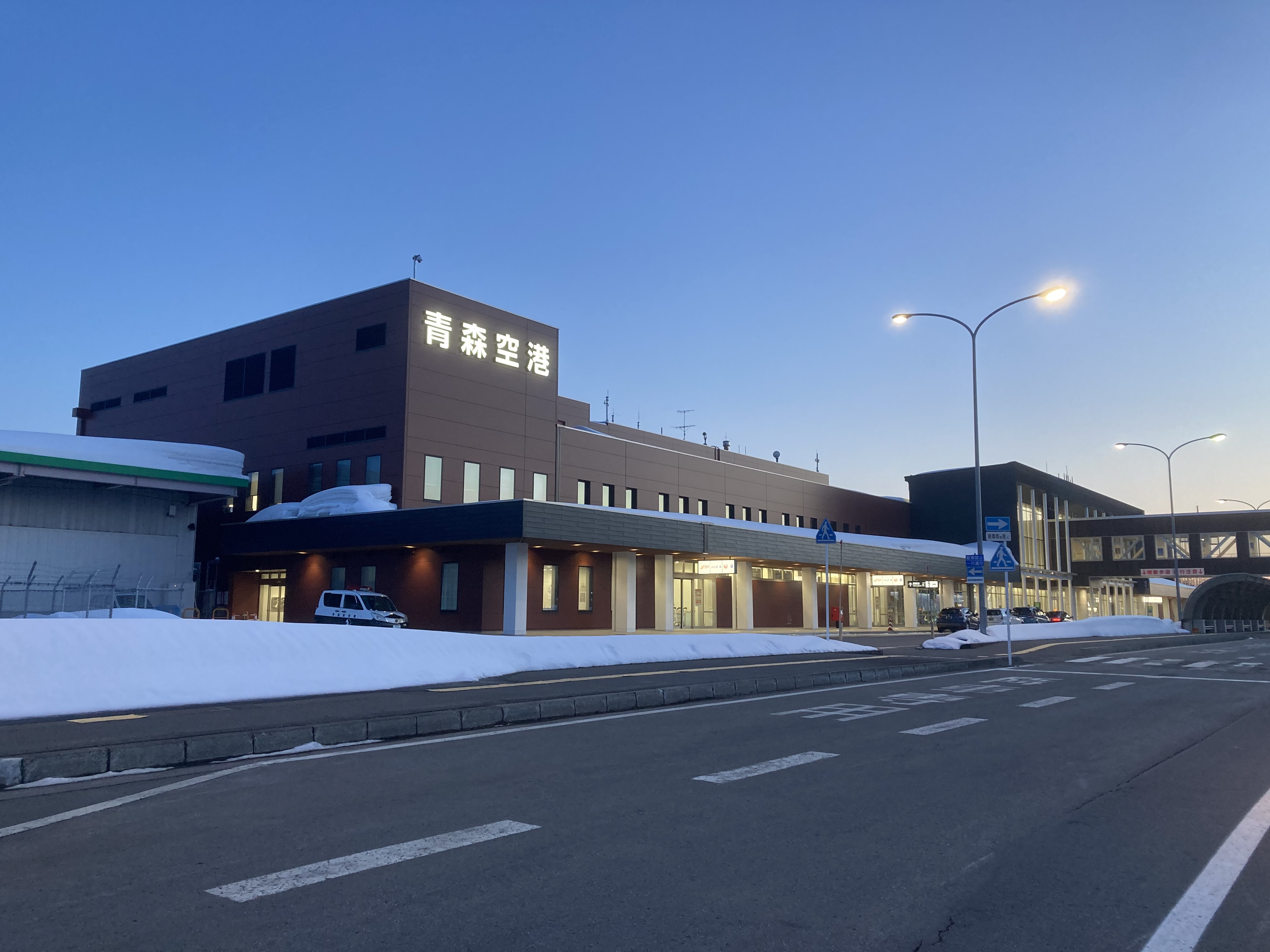
- The terminal building of Aomori Airport in 2021
- IATA: AOJ; ICAO: RJSA; WMO: 47542

Summary
- Airport type: Public
- Operator: Aomori Prefecture
- Serves: Aomori, Northern Tōhoku region
- Location: Kotani-1-5 Otani, Aomori, Aomori Prefecture, Japan
- Elevation AMSL: 650 ft (200 m)
- Coordinates: 40°44′00″N 140°41′19″E
- Website: www.aomori-airport.co.jp

Map
- Location in Japan AOJ/RJSA (Japan)

Runways
Direction	Length		Surface
Direction	m	ft	Surface
06/24	3,000	9,843	Asphalt concrete

Statistics (2024)
- Passengers: 1,226,628
- Cargo (metric tonnes): 644
- Aircraft movement: 17,741
- Source: Japanese Ministry of Land, Infrastructure, Transport and Tourism

Aomori Airport (青森空港, Aomori Kūkō) (IATA: AOJ, ICAO: RJSA) is an international airport located 11.2 km (7.0 mi) south-southwest of Aomori Station in Aomori Prefecture, Japan. In 2018, the airport was the 27th-busiest in Japan.

== History ==
Permission to build Aomori Airport was granted by the Ministry of Transport on 1 September 1962. Construction of the airport — at a location different than where Aomori airport stands today — was completed in August 1964 and the first Aomori airport was opened on 5 November 1964, in the town of Namioka that has since been annexed by the city of Aomori, with a single 1200 x 30 meter runway designed for use with the NAMC YS-11 aircraft. The airport was located at an altitude of 200 meters in a valley surrounded by mountains, which hampered operations during inclement weather. The runway was lengthened to 1,350 meters in 1971, widened to 45 meters in 1972, and extended to 1,400 meters in 1973. The terminal building was expanded in 1974, and again in 1978.

Due to the geographic limitations of the existing site, design work began to shift the position of the airport to its present location southwest of downtown Aomori, much of the land occupied by the old airport still lies within the northeastern premises of the current airport — roughly along the apron designated for light aircraft. The new facilities opened in 1987 with a single 2,000 x 60 meter runway, with an ILS system. The runway was extended to 2,500 meters in 1990. In 1995, the airport terminal building was remodeled, and certified as suitable for international operations.

The runway was extended to 3,000 meters in 2005, and the instrument landing system upgraded to handle Cat-3a fog conditions in 2007. The Tōhoku Shinkansen high-speed rail line was extended to Aomori in 2010, adding intense competition on the Aomori–Tokyo route. The government of Aomori Prefecture considered the privatization of the airport in 2012 following a study; however, as of 2019 the airport is still managed by the prefecture. After an increase in passenger traffic and the announcement of increased international services, the terminal was renovated in 2019. The renovation included increased capacity for international customers, the addition of prayer facilities for Muslim travelers, and aesthetic updates to the appearance of the entire terminal building.

=== Airline services ===
The first scheduled air service to and from Aomori Airport began on 1 June 1965, with Toa Airways - which would later be known as Japan Air System (JAS) - servicing Haneda Airport by NAMC YS-11 turboprop aircraft. All Nippon Airways began operations to Tokyo in 1994. In the following year, Korean Air began operations to Seoul and Siberian Airlines to Khabarovsk when the airport was certified for international operations. In 1998, Air Nippon began operations to Sendai Airport. However, usage of Aomori Airport fell short of projections, and the service was canceled after a year. In April 2003, ANA withdrew all operations from Aomori as well, turning its routes over to Skymark Airlines, which in turn ceased operations to Aomori from November of the same year. Siberian Airlines stopped its flights to Aomori in 2004.

Following the merger of JAS and Japan Airlines, all services run by JAS from Aomori were handed over to Japan Airlines in 2004 and the airline since then continued to operate flights to Osaka, Sapporo and Tokyo. ANA resumed services at Aomori Airport on 1 July 2014 with flights to Osaka–Itami and Sapporo–Chitose where the airline previously served these routes through nearby Odate–Noshiro Airport. On 17 July 2019, EVA Air began operating two flights per week between Aomori and Taoyuan International Airport. As of March 2025, international flights run once a day overall with 4 weekly flights to Seoul and 3 weekly flights to Taipei.

== Facilities ==
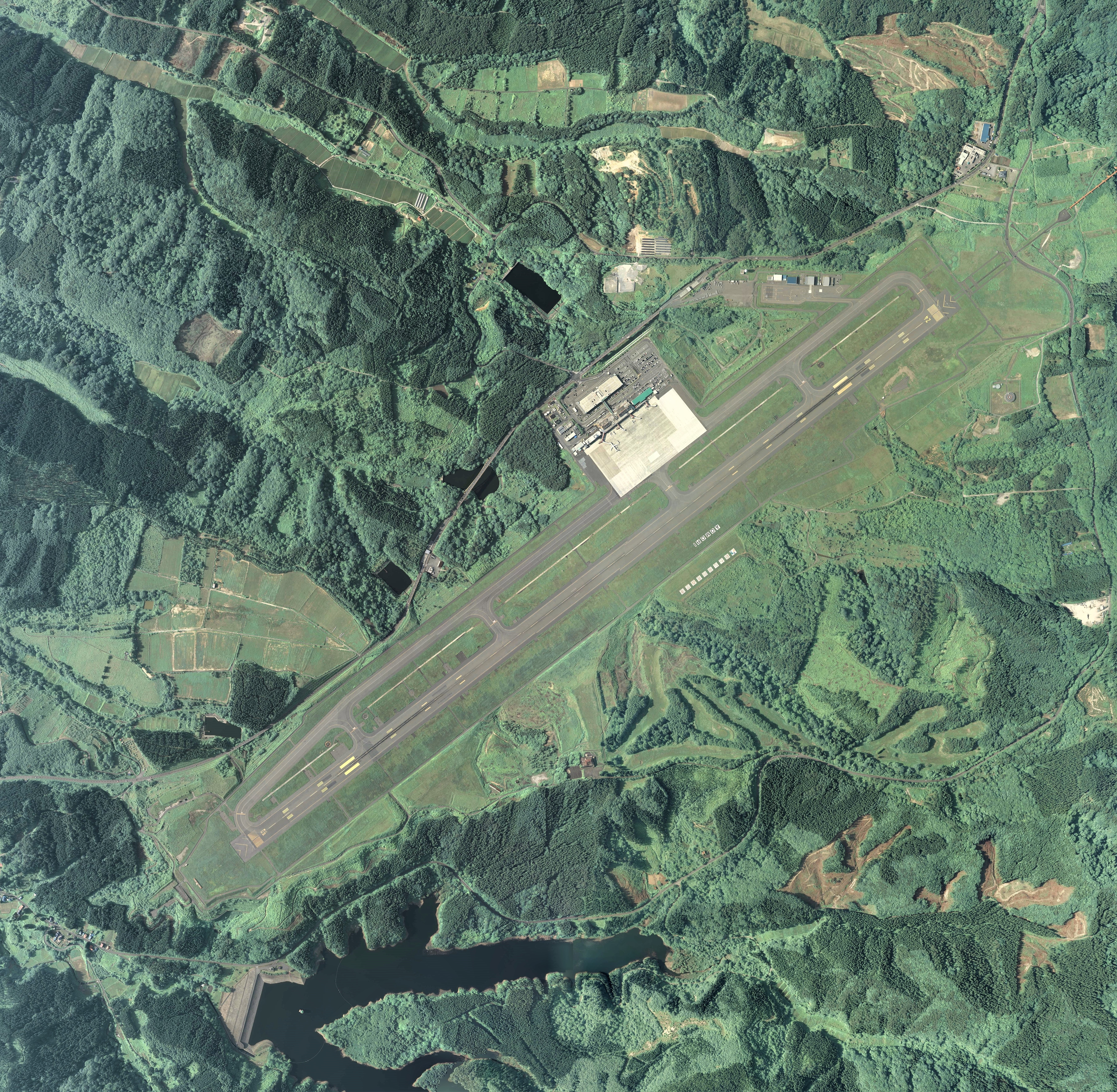
A 2017 aerial of Aomori Airport

Aomori Airport has one 3,000-meter-long (9,843 ft) runway that is aligned in a northeast to southwest heading. The runway gets covered in an average 669 centimeters (21.95 ft) of snow annually. The 38-vehicle White Impulse snow removal crew gets rid of the snow covering the airport's runway, taxiway, and apron; an area covering 55 square kilometers (21 sq mi), in 40 minutes.

== Airlines and destinations ==
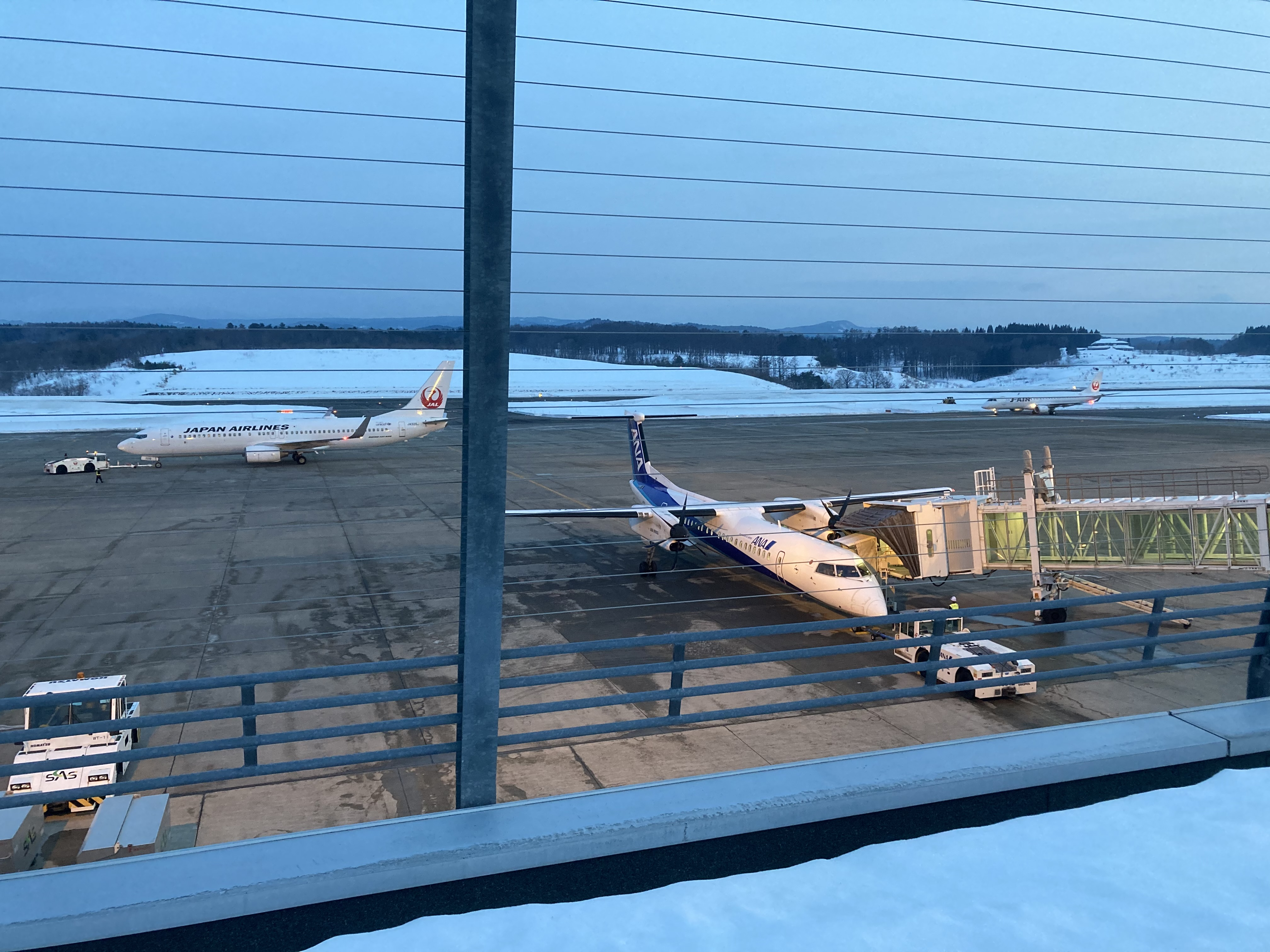
Apron traffic at Aomori Airport: pictured is a De Havilland Canada DHC-8-400 Dash 8 of ANA Wings parked at the gate, a Boeing 737 Next Generation of Japan Airlines during pushback, and an Embraer 190 of J-Air approaching the gate.

Airlines	Destinations
ANA Wings	Osaka–Itami, Sapporo–Chitose
EVA Air	Taipei–Taoyuan
Fuji Dream Airlines	Nagoya–Komaki
J-Air	Osaka–Itami, Sapporo–Chitose
Japan Airlines	Tokyo–Haneda
Korean Air	Seoul–Incheon

== Statistics ==
=== Annual traffic ===
Annual passenger traffic at RJSA, 2000–present
Year	Passengers	Year	Passengers	Year	Passengers
2000	1,616,471	2010	1,030,985	2020	484,615
2001	1,548,747	2011	823,346	2021	435,237
2002	1,603,724	2012	824,818	2022	887,053
2003	1,462,054	2013	860,158	2023	1,148,451
2004	1,301,395	2014	912,990	2024	1,226,628
2005	1,274,200	2015	992,696	2025	
2006	1,254,325	2016	1,072,554	2026	
2007	1,271,852	2017	1,167,436	2027	
2008	1,161,285	2018	1,190,902	2028	
2009	1,054,321	2019	1,250,569	2029	

== Ground transportation ==
The airport terminal can be accessed by car via the Aomori Airport Toll Road. The toll road connects the airport to central Aomori to the northeast and Hirosaki to the southwest. The western end of the toll road lies close to Namioka Interchange (exit 53) on the cross-country Tōhoku Expressway. The airport is serviced by scheduled bus service to central Aomori and Hirosaki; taxis and rental cars are also available.
