= A-Factory =

A-FACTORY
- エー・ファクトリー
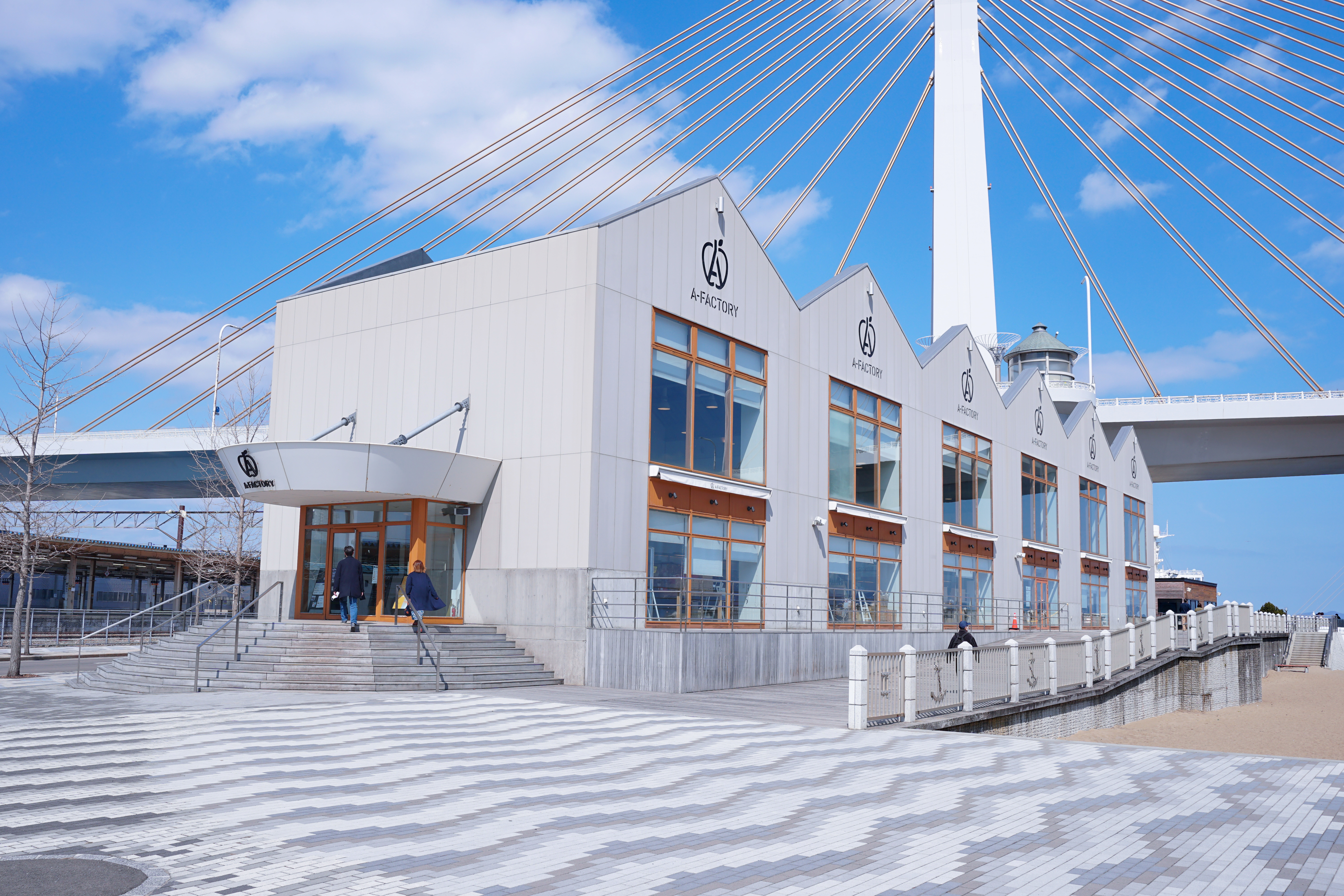

- Location within Aomori Prefecture Location within Japan

General information
- Architectural style: Industrial
- Location: 1-4-2 Yanakawa, Aomori, Japan
- Coordinates: 40°49′49.1″N 140°44′06.4″E
- Opened: 4 December 2010

Technical details
- Floor count: 2
- Lifts/elevators: 1

Design and construction
- Developer: JR East Aomori Business Development Company Co.Ltd. / Tsutomu Fujima
- Other designers: Masamichi Katayama
- Awards: 2011 Good Design Award
- Known for: Regional specialties and restaurants

Other information
- Parking: 16 spaces

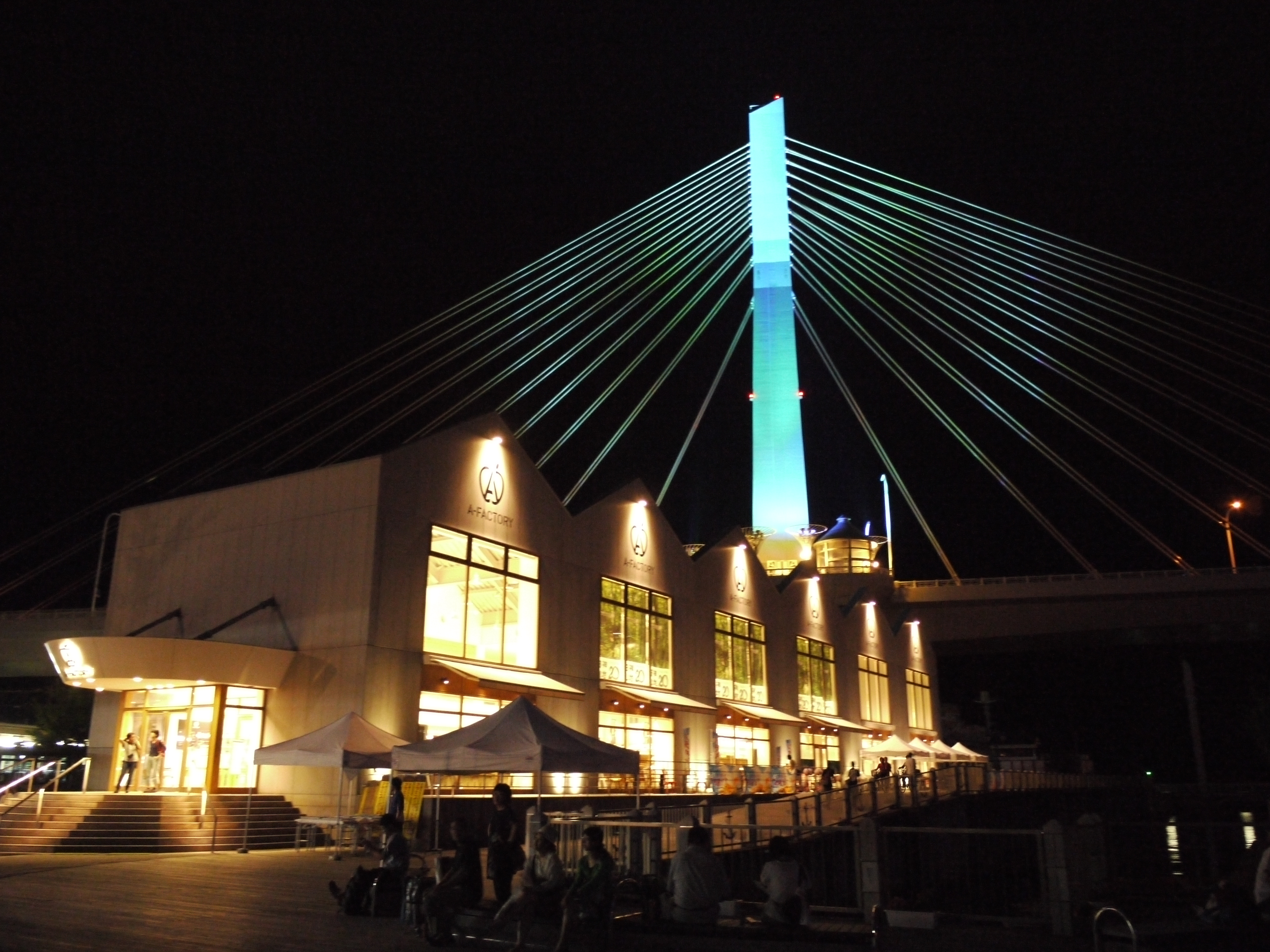
A-FACTORY and the Aomori Bay Bridge illuminated during the night.

A-Factory (エー・ファクトリー, Ee-fakutorii) (stylized as A-FACTORY) is a market located in Aomori, Aomori Prefecture near Aomori Station. The market was opened in conjunction with the extension of the Tōhoku Shinkansen to Aomori on 4 December 2010.

It is managed by JRE-ABC, a subsidiary of the East Japan Railway Company.

== Overview ==
The market is located on the Aomori Bay waterfront of Aomori underneath the Aomori Bay Bridge. The market is within the vicinity of Aomori Station and the Nebuta House Wa Rasse.

The market serves as a place where specialty goods from around Aomori Prefecture can be sold in an easily accessible location to tourists visiting the prefecture's capital. The market also features various restaurants, listed below.

Notable products include apples and cider from around the prefecture, as well as an in-house cider that visitors can see being produced.

The market was the recipient of a Good Design Award in 2011.

== Shops ==
- 1st Floor Slow Food Marche
  - Boulangerie Sevres（セブール）
  - Arpajon Le Pommier（アルパジョン）
  - Skip Egg
  - Ocean's Burger
  - Food Marchè
- 2nd Floor Third Place Lounge
  - Galetteria Da Sasino

== Surrounding area ==
- Aomori Station
  - Lovina
- AUGA
- Aomori Port
  - Aomori Bay Bridge
  - Aomori Prefecture Tourist Center
  - Nebuta House Wa Rasse
  - Seikan Connector Ferry Boat Memorial Ship “Hakkōda-maru”
- Aomori Prefectural Route 18 "Shinmachi"
