= Tō-Ō Nippō =

Newspaper in Aomori Prefecture, Japan

The Tō-Ō Nippō Press
- Walking with the community
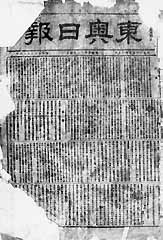
- First issue on 6 December 1888
- Type: Daily newspaper
- President: Yoshiteru Kawata
- Founded: 6 December 1888
- Language: Japanese
- Headquarters: 3-1-89 Dainitonya-machi, Aomori, Aomori Prefecture 030-0180, Japan
- City: Aomori
- Country: Japan
- Price: 130 yen (morning edition); 60 yen (evening edition); 3,400 yen (monthly subscription)
- Website: toonippo.co.jp

The Tō-Ō Nippō (東奥日報, Tōō Nippō; lit. 'eastern heartland daily report') is a newspaper published by The Tō-Ō Nippō Press (株式会社東奥日報社, Kabushiki gaisha Tōō Nippō) in Aomori, Aomori Prefecture, Japan. It is distributed throughout Aomori Prefecture. The newspaper traces its roots to the late 19th century and was established on 6 December 1888 as the first newspaper to be distributed throughout Aomori Prefecture.

== History ==
The Tō-Ō Nippō Press was established on 22 November 1888, with the first issue of the newspaper being published on the sixth of the following month. It was the first newspaper distributed throughout Aomori Prefecture. On 3 May 1910, the newspaper closed for three days after a large fire in Aomori. In 1928, the company began its publication of the Tō-Ō Yearbook, which provides data about the businesses and people of Aomori Prefecture.

The News Tō-Ō Building, owned by The Tō-Ō Nippō Press, opened in Shinmachi on 3 May 2019. The structure features an exhibition space that has been used for events, such as a display in early 2021 of the works of manga artist Hisashi Eguchi. On 1 September 2020, the newspaper discontinued its weekday evening edition.

== Headquarters and other buildings ==
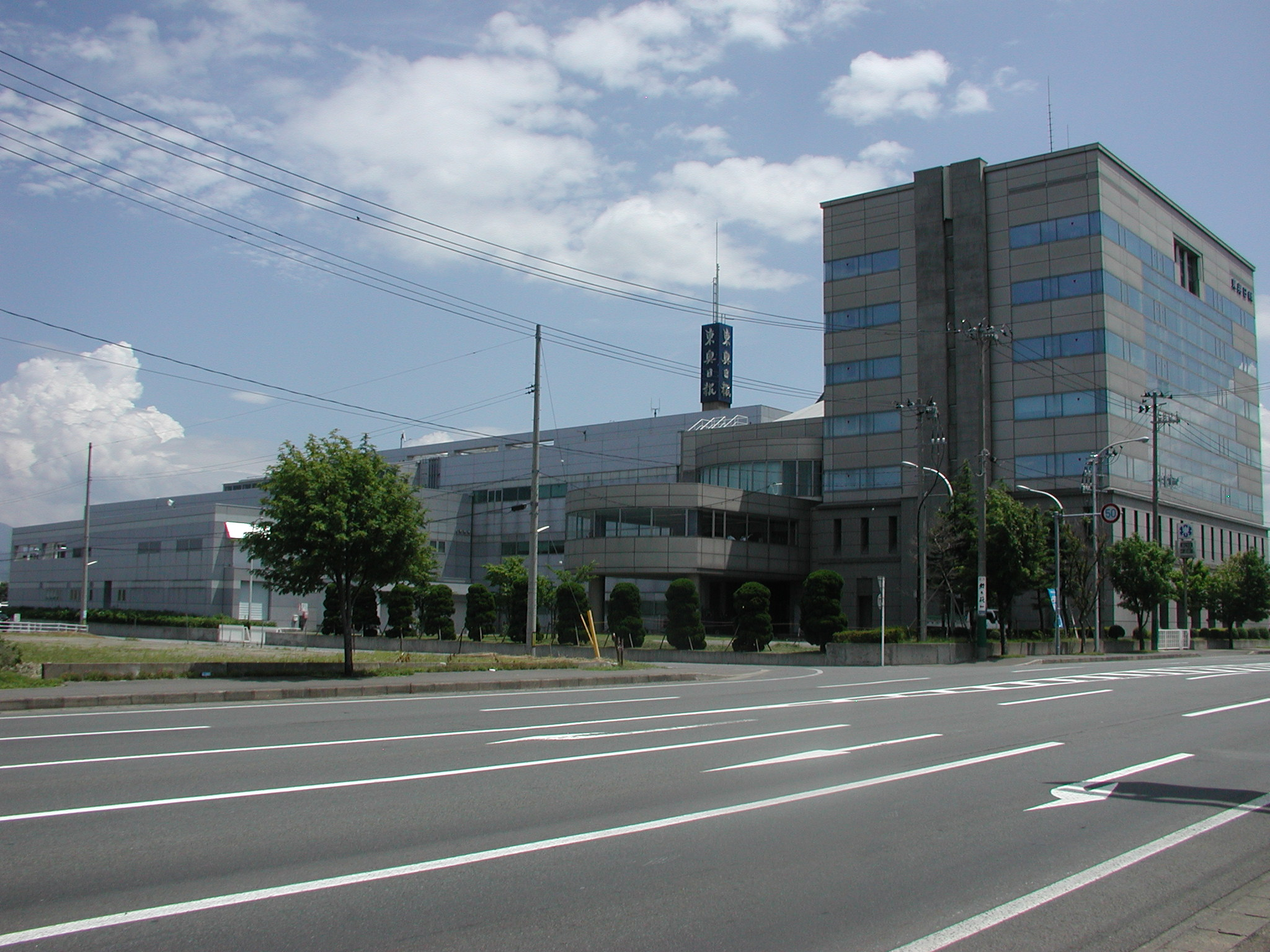
The headquarters of The Tō-Ō Nippō Press in 2010

The Tō-Ō Nippō Press is headquartered in the Dainitonya-machi district in the southern part of the city of Aomori. The News Tō-Ō Building is a multi-use building featuring exhibition space and a public working area in the Shinmachi district of central Aomori. The company has several branch offices throughout Aomori Prefecture, with the two largest ones being in Hachinohe and Hirosaki and smaller ones in the cities of Goshogawara, Tsugaru, Kuroishi, Hirakawa, Towada, Mutsu, and Misawa, and in the towns of Ajigasawa, Noheji, Sannohe, Gonohe, Itayanagi, and Oirase. The company also has offices located outside of the prefecture in Tokyo, Sendai, and Osaka.

== Circulation ==
The Tō-Ō Nippō is circulated and published in print as a daily morning edition. Prior to September 2020, an evening edition was circulated during the week as part of a set for subscribers; however, the evening edition was abolished, leaving the morning edition as the only circulation of the newspaper. The circulation of the former morning and evening edition complete set system (according to the Japan Audit Bureau of Circulation) is about 200,000 (as of April 2020). In Aomori Prefecture and some areas outside the prefecture, the paper can be delivered to subscribers, in other areas, it is possible to subscribe by mail with an additional fee for mailing costs. Additionally, an image of the print edition of the paper is digitally available for those residing outside of Aomori Prefecture.

== See also ==
- Media of Japan
