= Gappo Park =

City park in Aomori, Japan

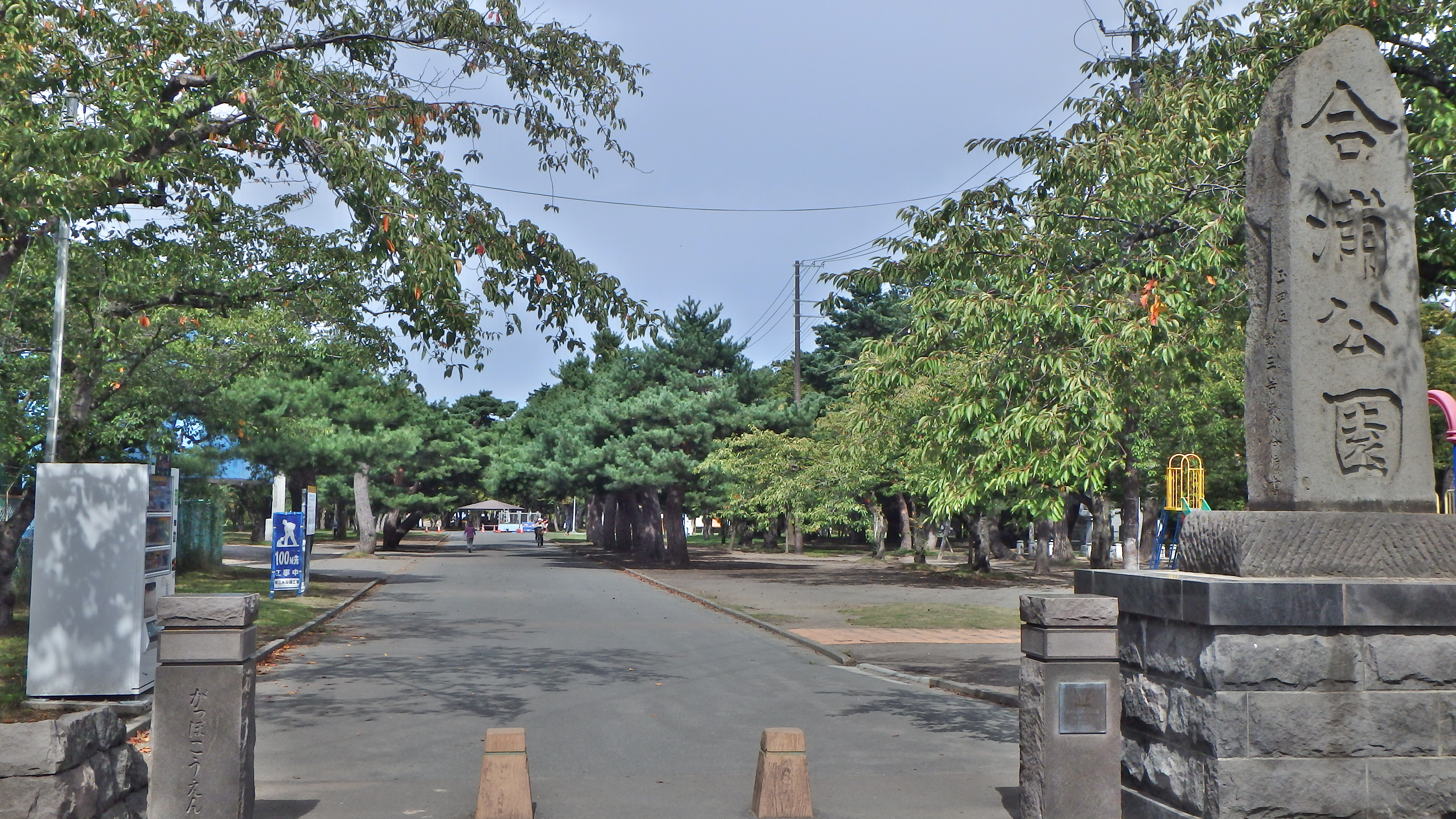
- The southern entrance to Gappo Park
- Interactive map of Gappo Park
- Location: Gappo, Aomori, Japan
- Coordinates: 40°49′48″N 140°46′45″E
- Area: 17 ha (42 acres)
- Created: 1895
- Public transit: Aomori City Bus

Gappo Park (合浦公園, Gappo kōen) is an urban park in the city of Aomori, Japan, located in the eastern part of the city. Major features of the park include a public beach on Aomori Bay, various decorative trees, and the Aomori City Baseball Stadium.

== Description ==
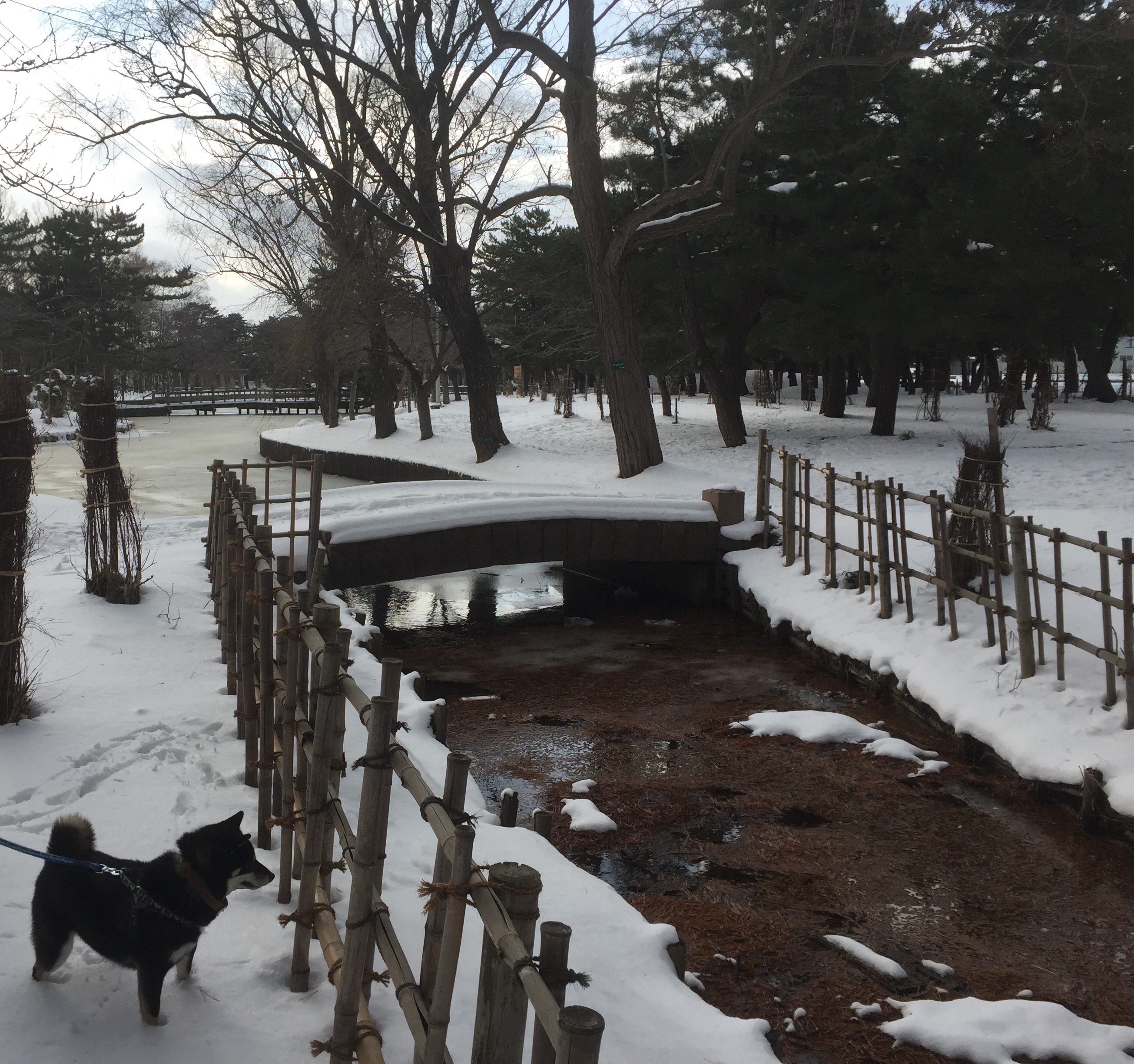
Gappo Park's wooded area in the winter.

The northern border of the park is Aomori Bay. A public beach lines the coast of the park along the bay. To the east of the park is the neighborhood of Tsukurimichi, a road divides the park from the neighborhood. The southern boundary of the park is flanked by shops and a shrine within the neighborhood of Gappo, National Route 4 lies just beyond the park's southern boundary. Various public buildings lie to the west of the park.

=== Design and layout ===
The park is centered around a 400-year-old black pine that grew alongside the Edo period road, the Ōshū Kaidō. The tree is the origin point for wide paved pathways that run towards the edges of the park. The park preserves the routing of the road in its east to west paved path as well as its boundary markers.

The pine trees line the paved pathways of the park. These trees were planted as a memorial to the Japanese casualties of the First Sino-Japanese War.

The park also includes a small zoo, playground space, a tennis court, an unpaved jogging course, and a tea pavilion. The park also has 670 Yoshino cherry trees. These trees make it a popular venue for hanami.

== History ==
The park was designed by the former official gardener of the Hirosaki Domain, Eisaku Mizuhara, and his brother Mijuro Kakizaki in 1881. The land they built the park on was the site of the Ōshū Kaidō, an Edo period road, and Eisaku's private land. In 1885 Eisaku died of karoshi (death by overwork) while building the park, after which Mijuro took full control of the park's construction. Mijuro's efforts ran into financial difficulty in 1890, so the then-town of Aomori provided subsidies to help complete the park with the goal of having it eventually designated as a public area. This happened in 1895 when the park, given the name Aomori Park, was donated to Aomori, officially creating the first public park in Aomori Prefecture. It was given its current name, Gappo Park, in 1901 when the park was expanded to the beach.

Train services to the park began on 15 January 1924 with the establishment of Namiuchi Station, though the only public transport to the area today is the Aomori City Bus since the Tōhoku Main Line was realigned away from the park in 1968.

After World War II, the park was occupied by the United States Armed Forces until it was returned to the city of Aomori in 1954.
