= Masamichi =

- Gender: Male

Origin
- Origin: Japanese
- Meaning: Different meanings depending on the kanji used

Masamichi (written 正道, 正通, 正則, 正路, 政通, 昌道, 誠道 or 将道) is a masculine Japanese given name. Notable people with the name include:

- Masamichi Abe, Japanese video game director
- Masamichi Amano (天野 正道; born 1957), Japanese composer
- Masamichi Hayashi (林 誠道; born 1996), Japanese footballer
- Inaba Masamichi (稲葉 正則; 1640–1716), Japanese daimyō
- Masamichi Katayama (片山 正通; born 1966), Japanese interior designer
- Masamichi Kitamoto (北本 正路; 1909–?), Japanese long-distance runner
- Masamichi Kondo (近藤 正道; born 1947), Japanese politician and lawyer
- Masamichi Kuriyama, Japanese handball player
- Masamichi Noro (野呂 昌道; born 1935), Japanese aikidoka
- Takatsukasa Masamichi (鷹司 政通; 1789–1868), Japanese noble
- Masamichi Takesaki (竹崎 正道; born 1933), Japanese mathematician
- Tōgō Masamichi (東郷 正路; 1852–1906), Imperial Japanese Navy admiral
- Masamichi Yamagiwa (山際 正道; 1901–1975), Japanese businessman and banker
- Masamichi Yamamoto (山本 雅道; born 1978), Japanese cyclist
