= Aomori City Forestry Museum =

Museum in Aomori, Japan

- 青森市森林博物館
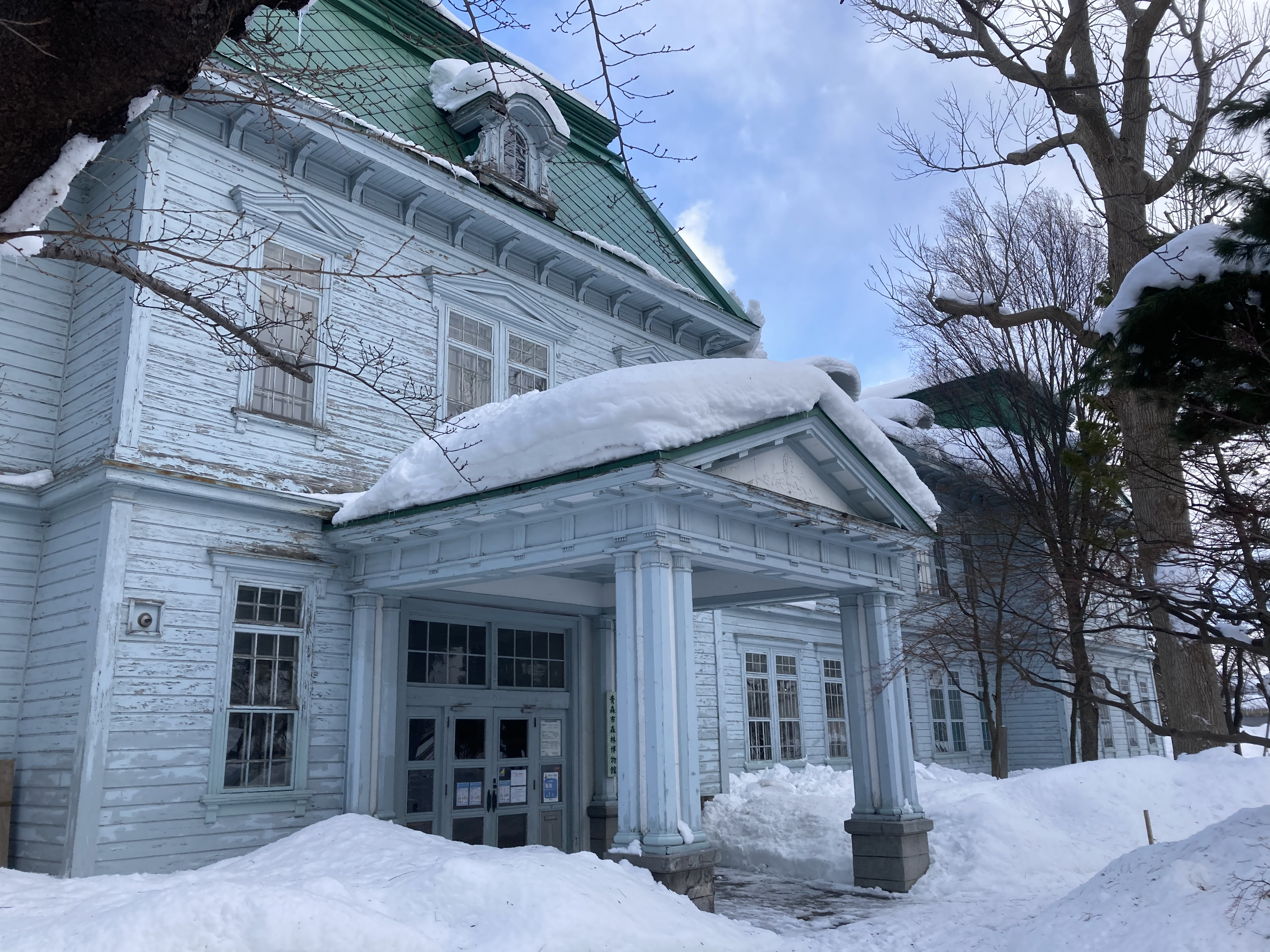
- The Aomori City Forestry Museum during the winter
- Former name: Aomori Bureau of Forestry Building
- Established: November 1982
- Location: 2 Chome-4-37 Yanakawa, Aomori, Aomori Prefecture, Japan
- Coordinates: 40°49′53.4″N 140°43′32.6″E
- Type: Natural history museum
- Owner: The city of Aomori
- Public transit access: Aomori Station
- Parking: On site (no charge)
- Website: Official website

The Aomori City Forestry Museum (青森市森林博物館, Aomori-shi Shinrin Hakubutsukan) is a natural history museum located in the city of Aomori in Aomori Prefecture, Japan. The museum focuses primarily on the forest ecosystems of Aomori Prefecture and the history of the lumber industry in the prefecture, though other unrelated exhibits are also maintained.

== History ==
The building that houses the museum was originally the Aomori Bureau of Forestry Building which was built on 13 November 1908. The forestry building was featured in the set of the 1977 film Mount Hakkoda about the Hakkōda Mountains incident. It was converted into a natural history museum that opened to the public in November 1982.

== Exhibits ==
The Aomori City Forestry Museum's main exhibits are dedicated to the forests and history of the lumber industry in Aomori Prefecture. These exhibits are held in different rooms throughout the building. The recommended path through the building takes visitors first through an exhibit focusing on the forest ecosystems of the prefecture, with a heavy focus on the various types of trees that grow there. The next exhibit in the museum is dedicated to the historic and cultural aspects of the woodcutting and woodworking industry. It includes examples of folk songs sung by workers, a cross section of a typical house built in the region, tools and apparel worn by laborers in the timber industry, and various crafts by woodworkers. The next exhibit ties the two aspects together and attempts to immerse visitors in what working in the industry was like by displaying more of the tools and crafts of the workers, but also by providing interactive displays. The final piece of the main exhibit is located in a building adjacent to the main building. It houses a train that was used on one of the defunct lumber railways of the prefecture.

The museum also has exhibits dedicated to the Mount Hakkoda film that was filmed there and the nearby Komakino Site. The Komakino Site exhibit features various artifacts from the Jōmon period including earthenware, stone tools, and dogū figurines.

== See also ==
- List of Important Tangible Folk Cultural Properties
