= Seikan Ferry =

Ferry service in Japan

Seikan ferry 青函フェリー
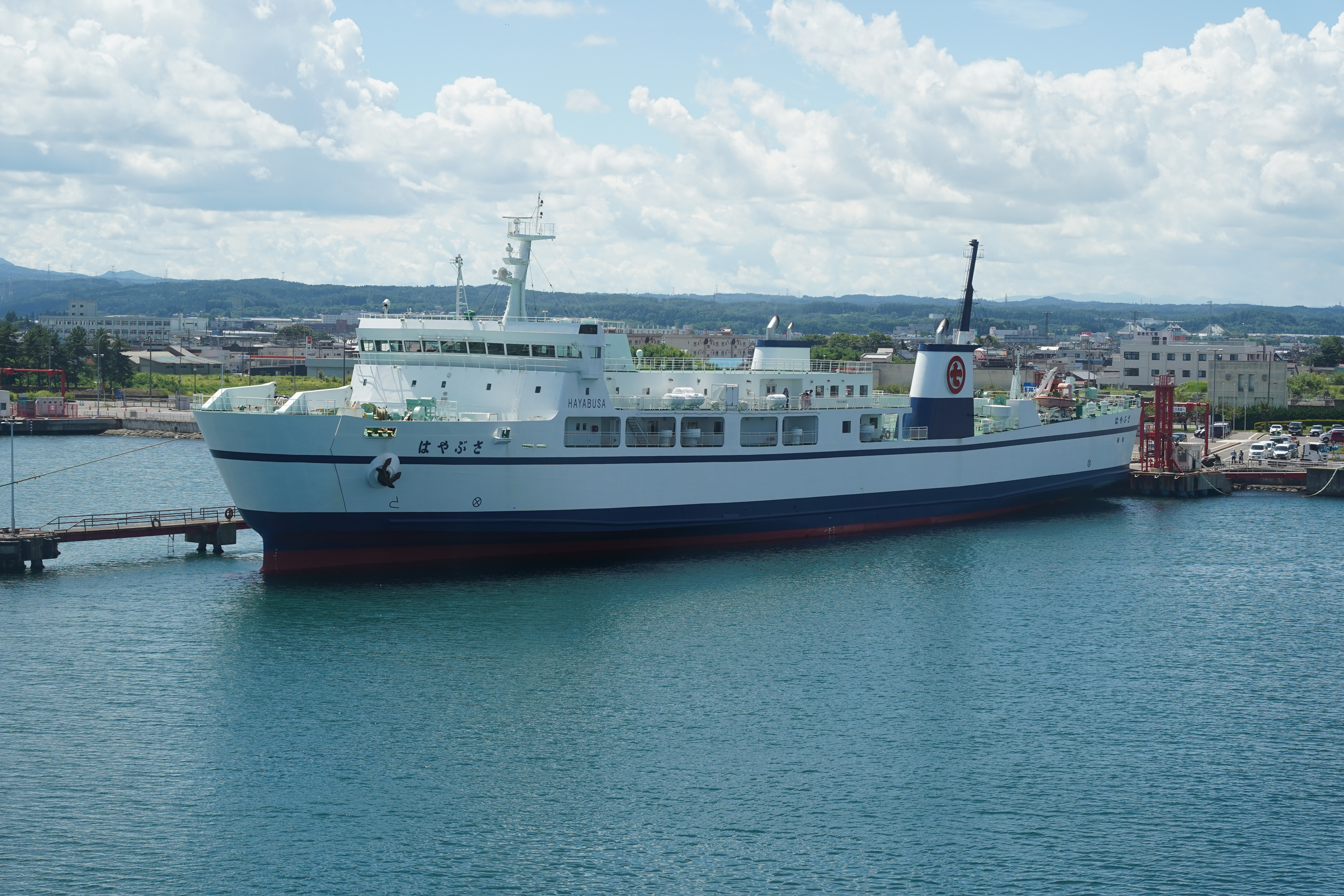
- Ferry Hayabusa (4th generation) at the Port of Aomori.
- Locale: Aomori Prefecture, Hokkaido
- Waterway: Tsugaru Strait
- Transit type: Passenger and automobile ferry
- Route: Aomori–Hakodate
- Operator: Kyoei Transportation Co., Ltd. and Northern Japan Shipping Corporation
- Began operation: 1973
- Travel time: 3 - 4 hours (2018)
- Connections at Aomori
- Train: Shin-Aomori Station
- Bus: Aomori City Bus
- Road: Port Road Route 1 Aomori Bay Bridge
- Connections at Hakodate
- Train: Goryōkaku Station
- Bus: Hakodate Bus Corporation
- Road: National Route 227
- Website: http://www.seikan-ferry.co.jp/

The Seikan Ferry (青函フェリー) is a privately owned ferry service crossing the Tsugaru Strait, which separates the Japanese islands of Hokkaido and Honshu. The company, Seikan Ferry Ltd. (有限会社青函フェリー), was founded in 1973 and runs between the cities of Aomori on the northern tip of Honshu and Hakodate in southern Hokkaido.

== Route ==
This route links the Port of Hakodate in Hakodate with the Port of Aomori in Aomori. A trip takes three hours and twenty minutes one way, and is operated by four ships: the Hayabusa, Hayabusa 3, Asakaze 5, and Asakaze 21. Each ship makes two round trips a day, with a total of eight round trips per day between Aomori and Hakodate. With the conversion of the Seikan Tunnel from conventional trains to the Hokkaido Shinkansen, this route has seen a resurgence in ridership as a budget alternative between Aomori and Hakodate.

== Fleet ==
Ship	Built	Gross tonnage	Length	Width	Passengers	Trucks	Speed	Former Owner
Hayabusa 3	2000	2,107	101.5 m	15.9 m	105	25	19	Kyoei Unyu
Hayabusa (4th generation)	2014	2,949	114.9 m	19.0 m	300	44	19	Kyoei Unyu
Asakaze 5	1998	1,958	144 m	15.8 m	103	24	19	Kitanihon Kaiun
Asakaze 21	2017	2,048	101.5 m	15.8 m	198	26	21	Kitanihon Kaiun
