= Munakata Shiko Memorial Museum of Art =

Coordinates: 40.8194°N 140.7600°E

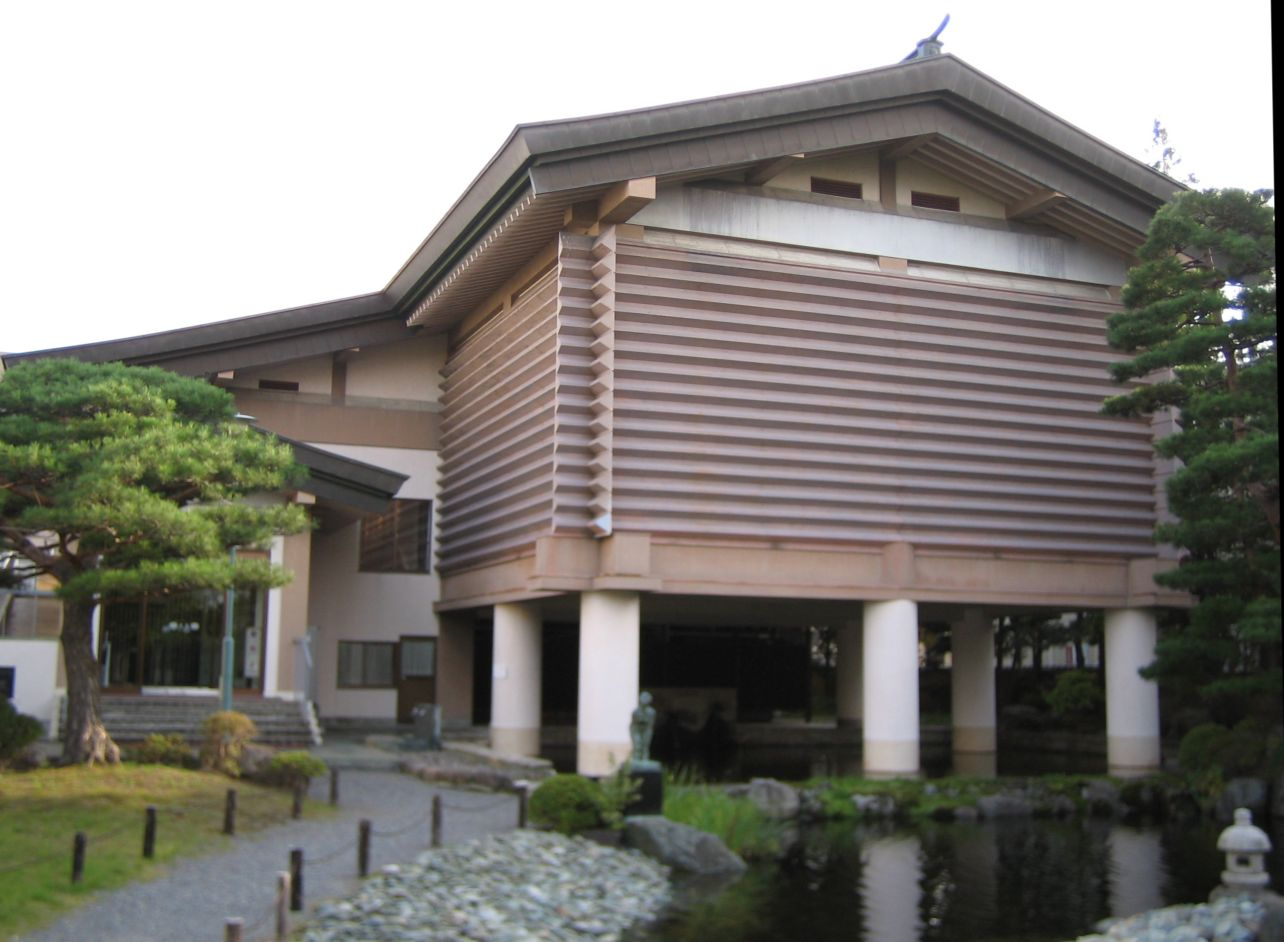
Munakata Shiko Memorial Museum of Art

The Munakata Shiko Memorial Museum of Art (棟方志功記念館, Munakata Shikō Kinenkan) is a museum located in Aomori, Aomori Prefecture, Japan. It features works from Shikō Munakata, a woodblock printmaker who was born in Aomori City. The museum was serviced since 1975 to 2024.
