= Aomori University of Health and Welfare =

Coordinates: 40°48′48″N 140°47′27″E

- 青森県立保健大学
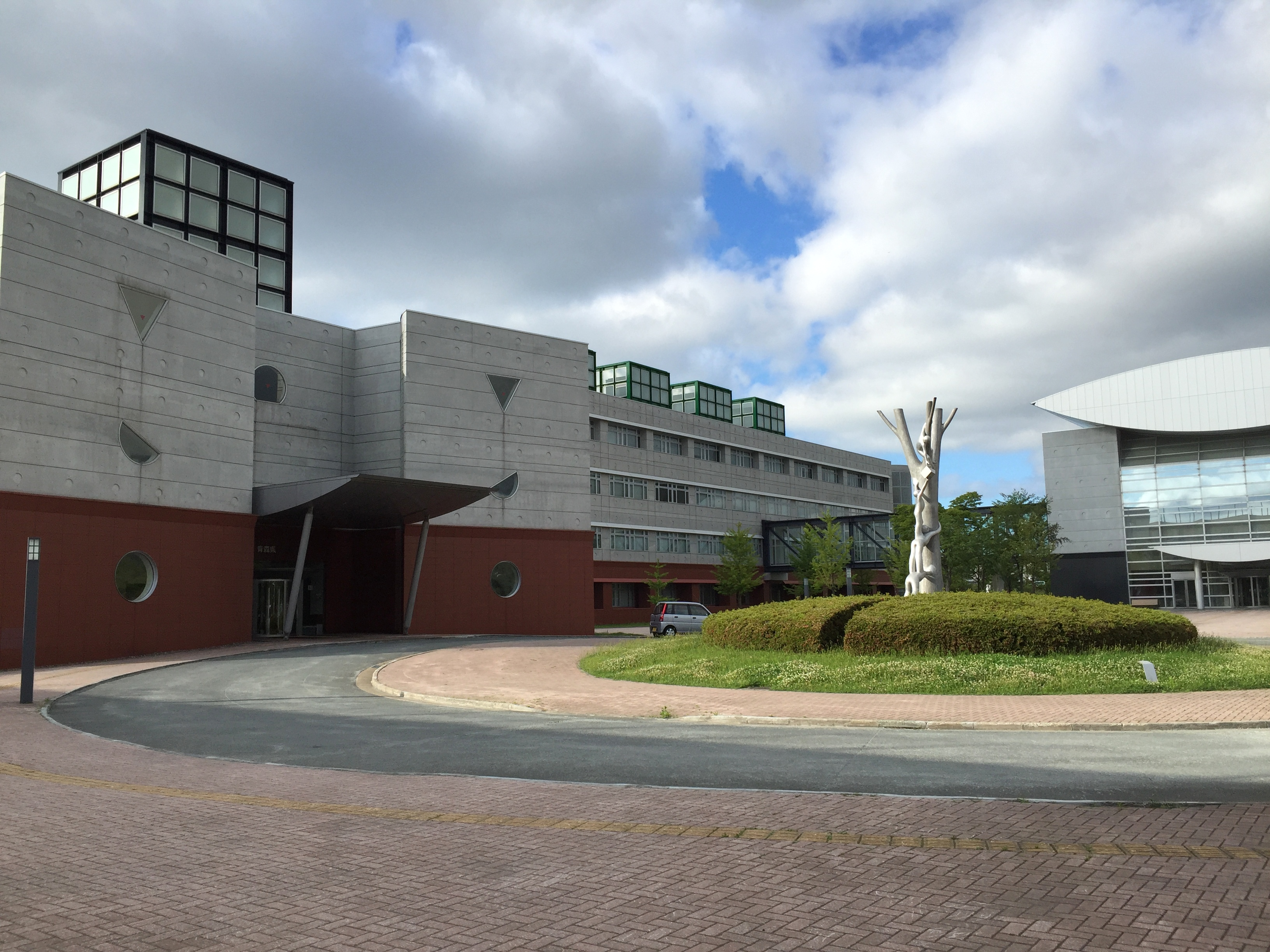
- Aomori University of Health and Welfare in Aomori, Japan
- Type: Public
- Established: 1999
- President: Kazuko Kamiizumi
- Location: Aomori, Aomori, Japan
- Website: Official website

Aomori University of Health and Welfare (青森県立保健大学, Aomori kenritsu hoken daigaku) is a public university in the city of Aomori, Aomori Prefecture Japan. The school was established in 1999. The school is a Facility of Health Sciences, with departments of nursing, physical therapy and social welfare.
