= Aomori Public University =

Coordinates: 40°45′14″N 140°46′19″E

- 青森公立大学
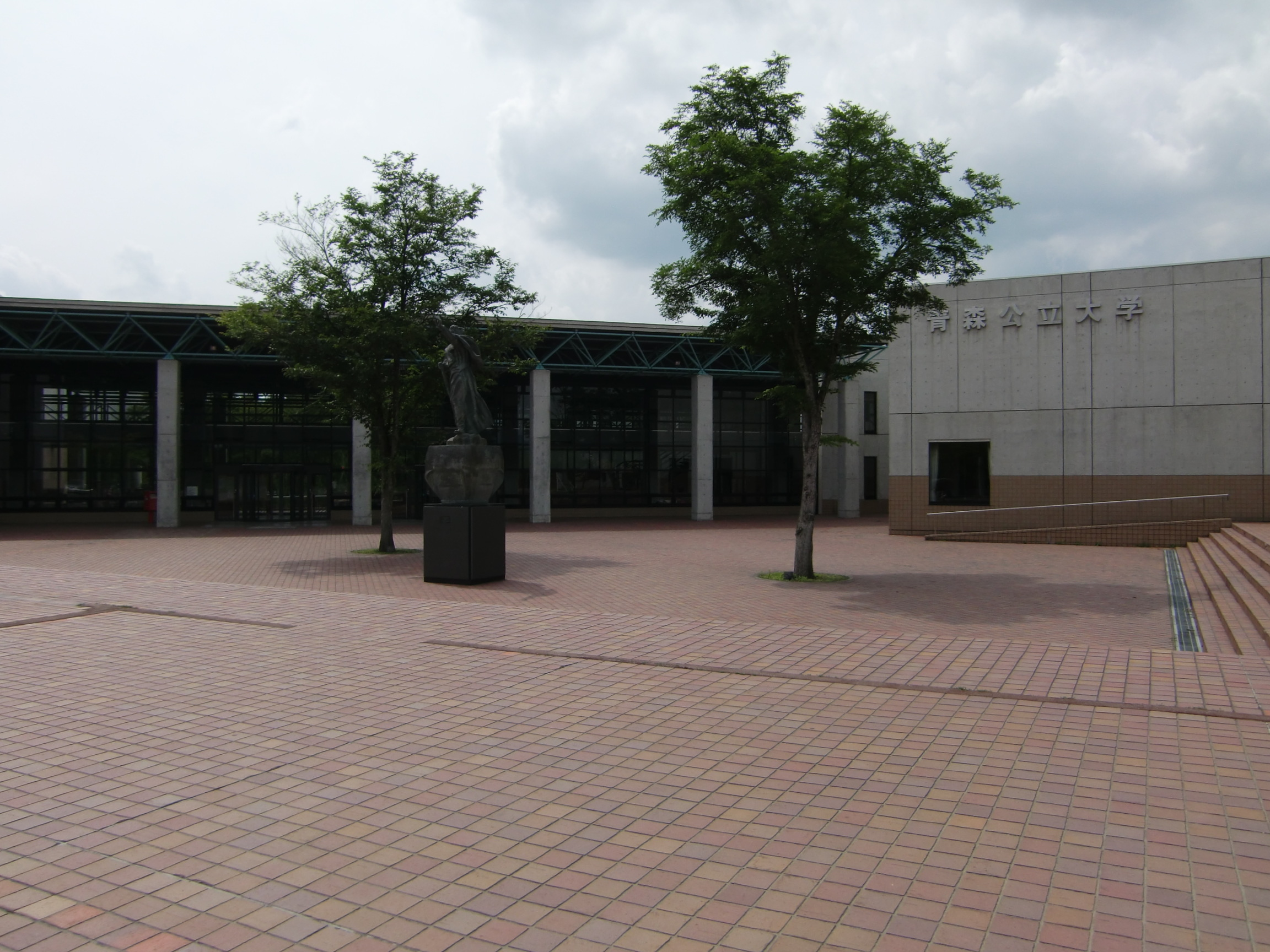
- Main Gate
- Type: Public
- Established: 1993
- Location: Aomori, Aomori, Japan
- Website: Official website

Aomori Public University (青森公立大学, Aomori kōritsu daigaku) is a public university in the city of Aomori, Aomori Prefecture, Japan. The school was established in 1993 as Aomori Public College. The English name for the university has changed since 2013.

== Faculty ==
=== Faculty of Management and Economics ===
This Faculty includes the following departments:

- Department of Management
- Department of Economics
- Department of Local Future
