= Nogiwa Park =

City park in Aomori, Japan

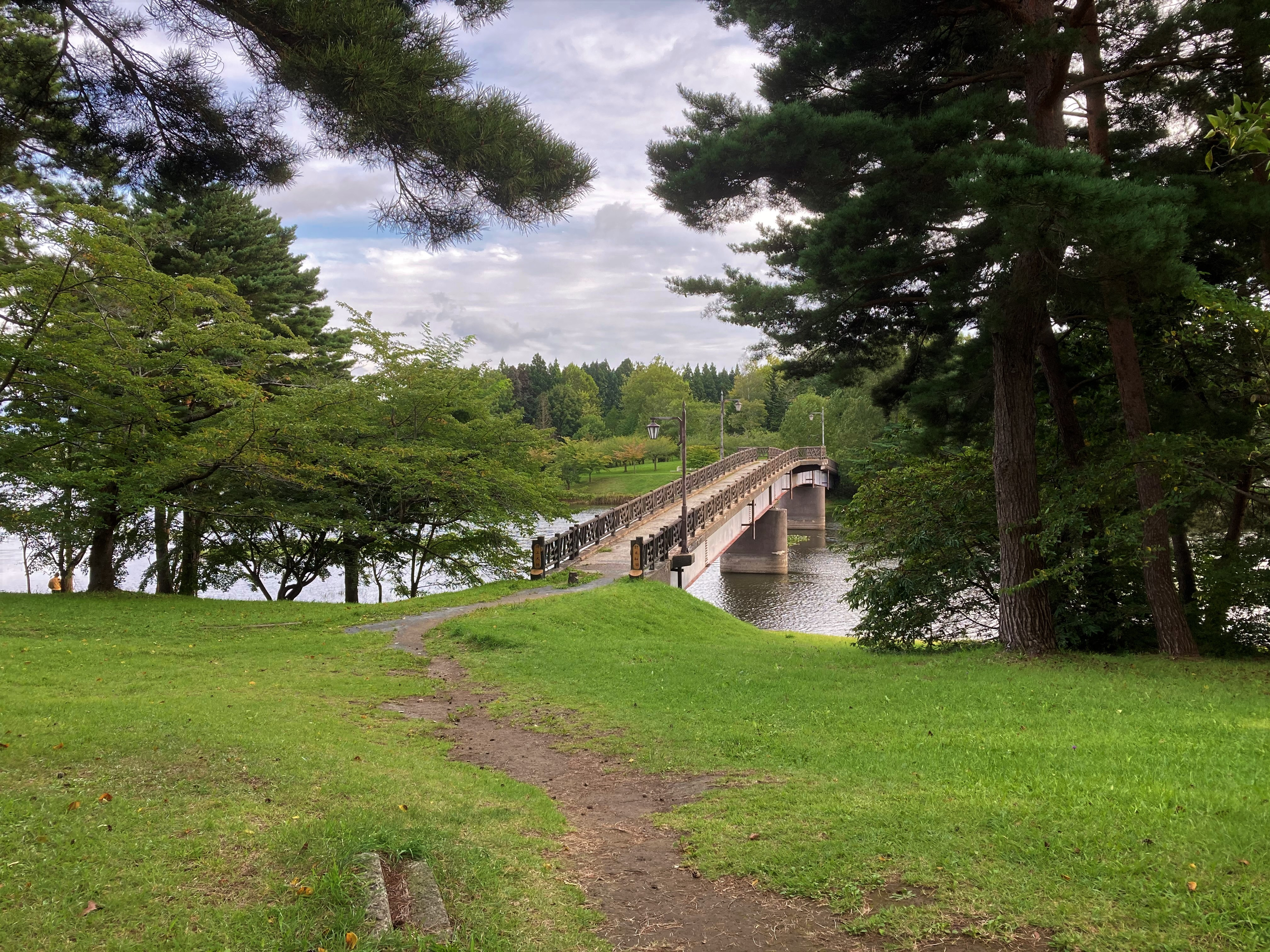
- Kojō Ōhashi in Nogiwa Park
- Interactive map of Nogiwa Park
- Location: Hajiro, Aomori, Japan
- Coordinates: 40°51′00″N 140°40′33″E
- Area: 33.9 ha (84 acres)
- Created: Unclear, before 1972
- Public transit: Aomori City Bus; Tsugaru Line – Aburakawa Station

Nogiwa Park (野木和公園, Nogiwa kōen) is an urban park in the western part of the city of Aomori, Japan. Major features of the park include a reservoir, various decorative trees, wetlands, several footbridges, and an observatory.

== Description ==
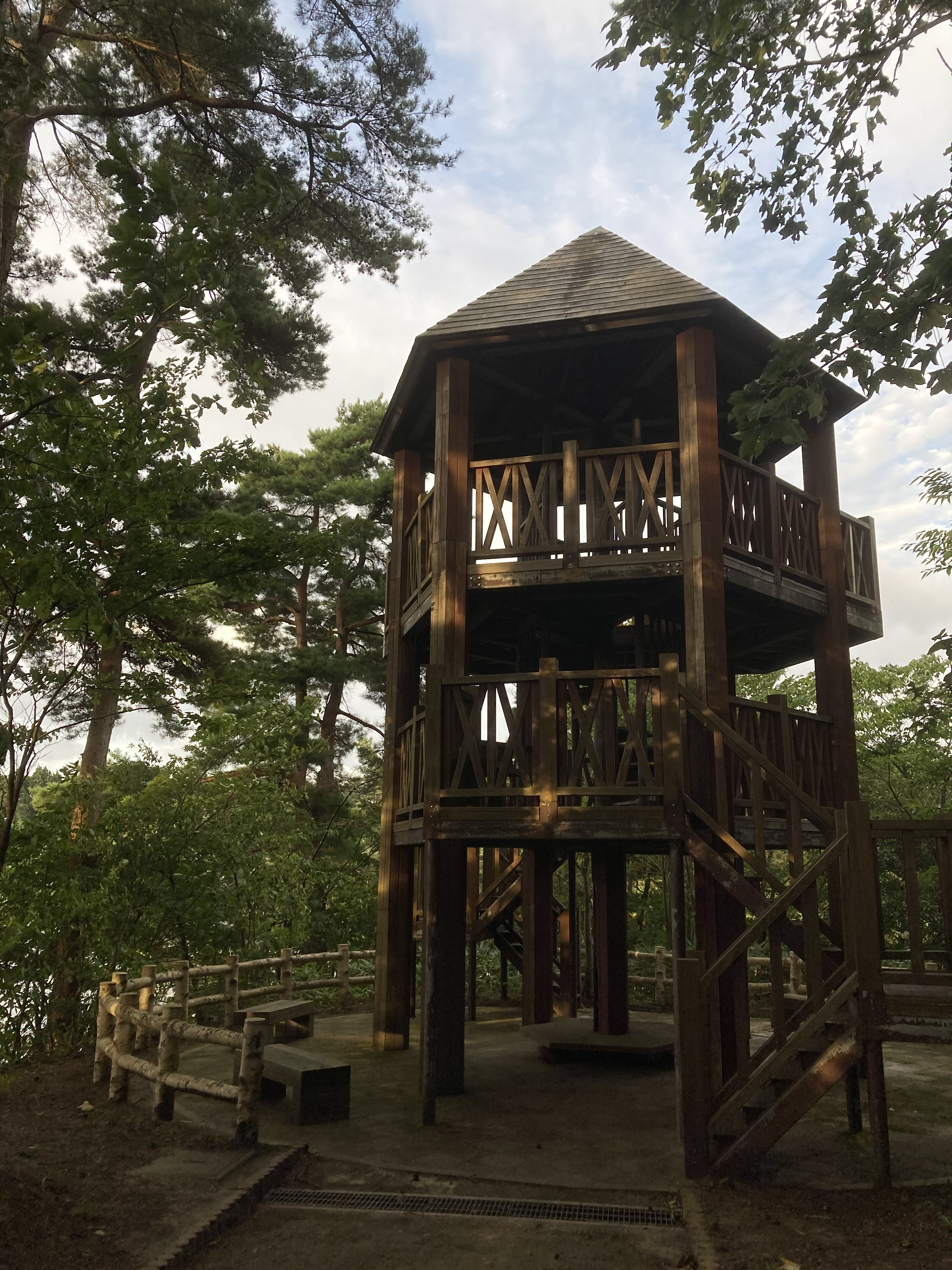
The Nogiwa Park Observatory

Nogiwa Park is adjacent to National Route 280 to the east and Aomori Prefecture Route 26 to the south in the district of Hajiro in western Aomori. It is roughly 1.1 kilometers (0.68 mi) southwest of Aburakawa Station on the Tsugaru Line. The land to the north of the park is primarily made up of paddy fields. The western side of the park is made up of hilly terrain that marks the eastern edge of the foothills of the Tsugaru Mountains.

The central feature of Nogiwa Park is Nogiwa Lake, a reservoir built in the 17th century, where recreational fishing is permitted. A wooden observatory tower is placed in the northwestern corner of the park where it affords a view of the lake that largely surrounds it. Four footbridges carry the park's pathways over sections of Nogiwa Lake: Nogiwa Sansaku-hashi, Kojō Ōhashi, Mikaeri-hashi, and Kōun-hashi. The rest of the park is forested with decorative trees including black and red pines, weeping willow, and Yoshino cherry. The park's cherry trees are an attraction at its Aomori Spring Festival.

== History ==
The date of Nogiwa Park's creation is unknown, but the reservoir it is centered on, Lake Nogiwa, was built in the late 17th century in the former village of Hajiro. It is likely that Lake Nogiwa is the oldest reservoir in the city of Aomori. The lake was used in a fish farm project to celebrate the arrival of Crown Prince Yoshihito in the region in September 1908. The lake functioned as a public source of water and ice until 1945.

Due to the 1945 wartime expansion of Aomori Airfield, a private airstrip that once existed near the park, the Tsugaru Logging Railway, was moved into what is currently part of Nogiwa Park. The railway was located on the northeastern shore of Lake Nogiwa where a road through the park exists currently. After the end of World War II, the park was used as a site for spring festivals, and fishing tournaments began to be held at Lake Nogiwa. The Tsugaru Logging Railway was closed in 1967 and in 1972 planning for the improvement of the park by the city of Aomori began. Projects to improve the park began the next year. Tree planting events were held every May from 1985 to 1988 to develop a forest within the park.
