= Aomori =

Aomori 青森市
- Prefecture capital and Core city
- Aomori City
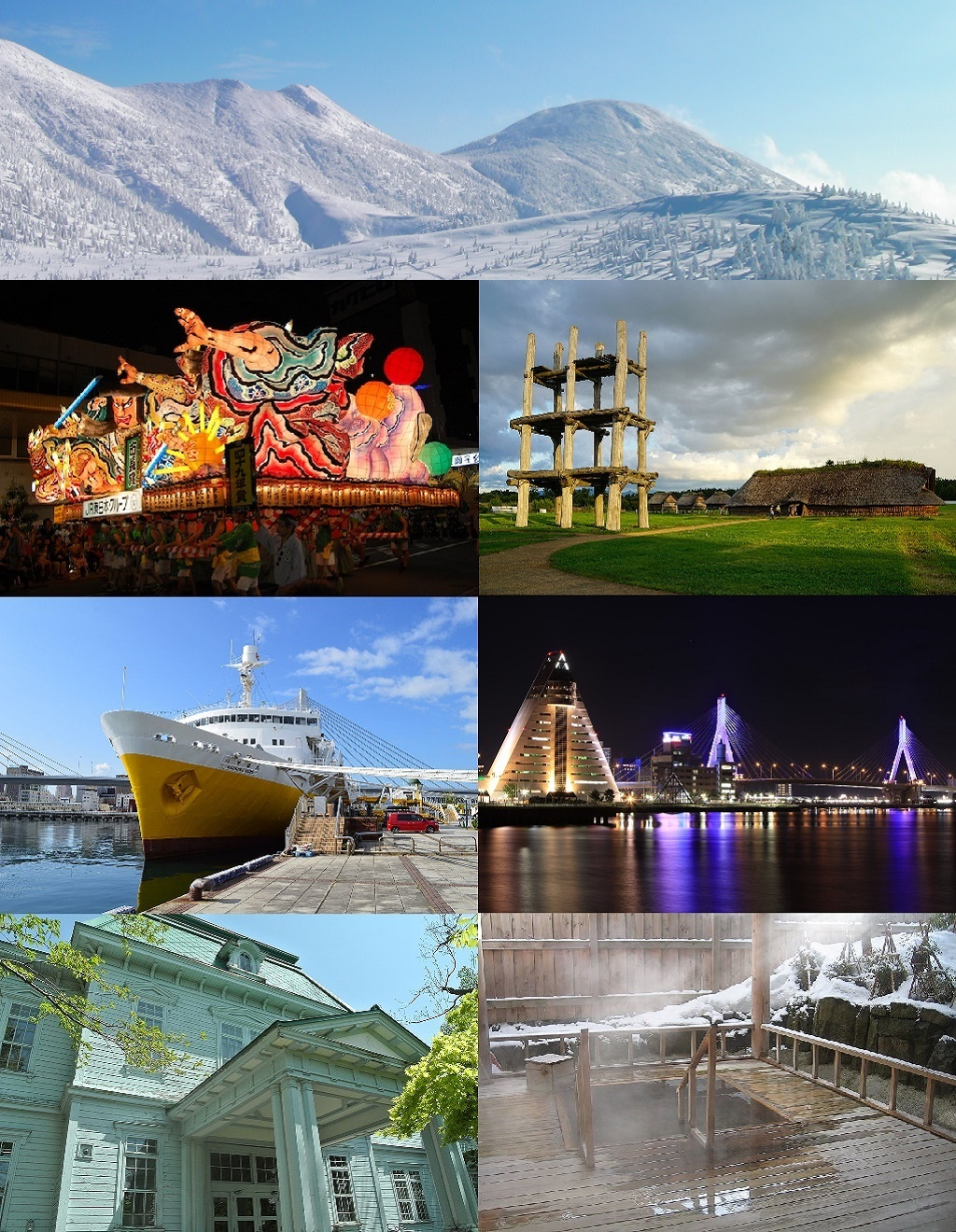
- From top to bottom, left to right: The Hakkōda Mountains, Aomori Nebuta Matsuri, Sannai-Maruyama Site, Seikan Ferry Memorial Ship Hakkōda Maru, the waterfront of Aomori as seen from Aomori Bay, the Aomori City Forestry Museum, and Asamushi Onsen

- Flag Seal
- Interactive map of Aomori
- Location within Japan
- Coordinates: 40°49′22″N 140°44′49″E
- Country: Japan
- Region: Tōhoku
- Prefecture: Aomori
- Utō-mura: ?
- Aomori-mura: 1626
- Aomori-machi: 1 April 1889
- Aomori-shi: 1 April 1898

Government
  - Mayor: Hideki Nishi (since June 2023)

Area
  - Prefecture capital and Core city: 824.61 km^{2} (318.38 sq mi)
- Elevation: 0 to 1,584 m (0 to 5,197 ft)

Population (1 August 2023)
  - Prefecture capital and Core city: 264,945
  - Density: 321.30/km^{2} (832.16/sq mi)
  - Metro: 310,640
- Demonym: Aomorian
- Time zone: UTC+09:00 (JST)
- Area code: 02201-2
- Phone number: 017-734-1111
- Address: 1-22-5 Chūō, Aomori-shi, Aomori-ken
- Website: Official website
- Symbols
- Bird: Ural owl
- Flower: Rosa rugosa
- Insect: Firefly
- Tree: Maries' fir

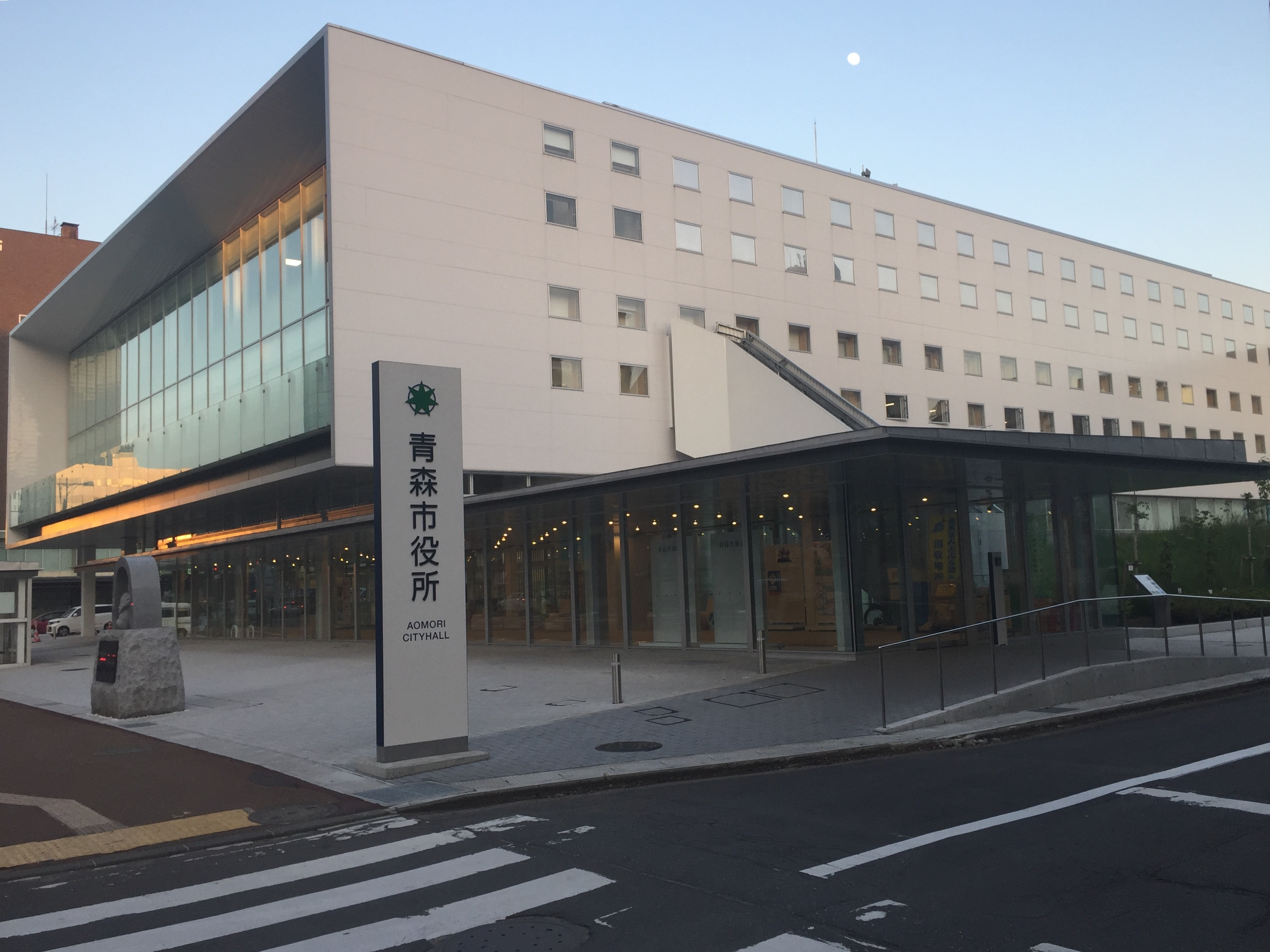
Aomori City Hall

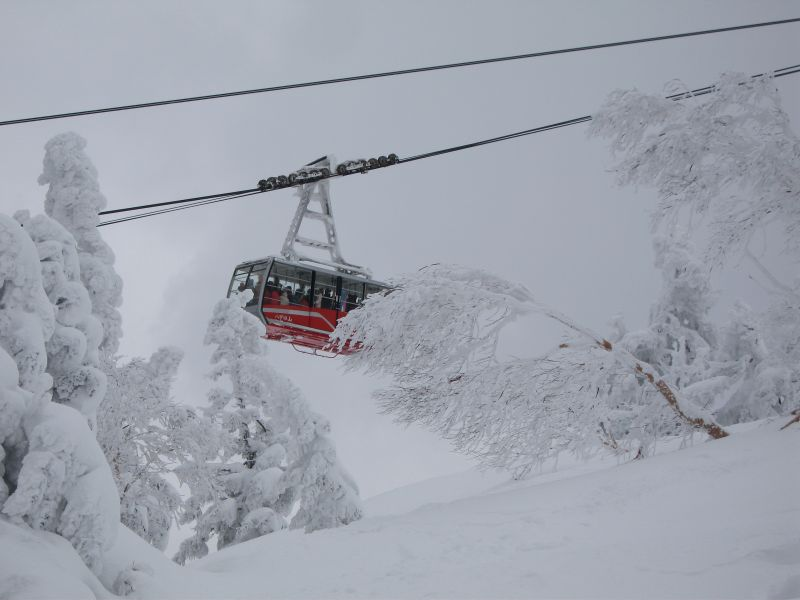
Hakkoda Ropeway

Aomori (青森, Aomori; Japanese pronunciation: [ä̀.ó̞.mò̞.ɾʲì], locally [ä̀.ó̞.mó̞.ɾʲí]), officially Aomori City (青森市, Aomori-shi; [ä̀.ó̞.mó̞.ɾʲí.ɕì]), is the capital city of Aomori Prefecture, in the Tōhoku region of Japan. As of 1 August 2023, the city had an estimated population of 264,945 in 136,781 households, and a population density of 321 people per square kilometer spread over the city's total area of 824.61 km^{2} (318.38 sq mi). Aomori is one of Japan's 62 core cities and the core of the Aomori metropolitan area.

== Etymology ==
The Hirosaki Domain first established a port settlement with the name Aomori (青森) in 1624. The name Aomori (青森) is composed of the components ao (青) "blue", "green", (Note: Ao can mean "blue" or "green", depending on context.) and mori (森) "forest", "woods", and can be literally translated as "green forest". The name most likely originates from a small forest on a hill that existed nearby, which is said to have been used by fishermen as a landmark.

== History ==
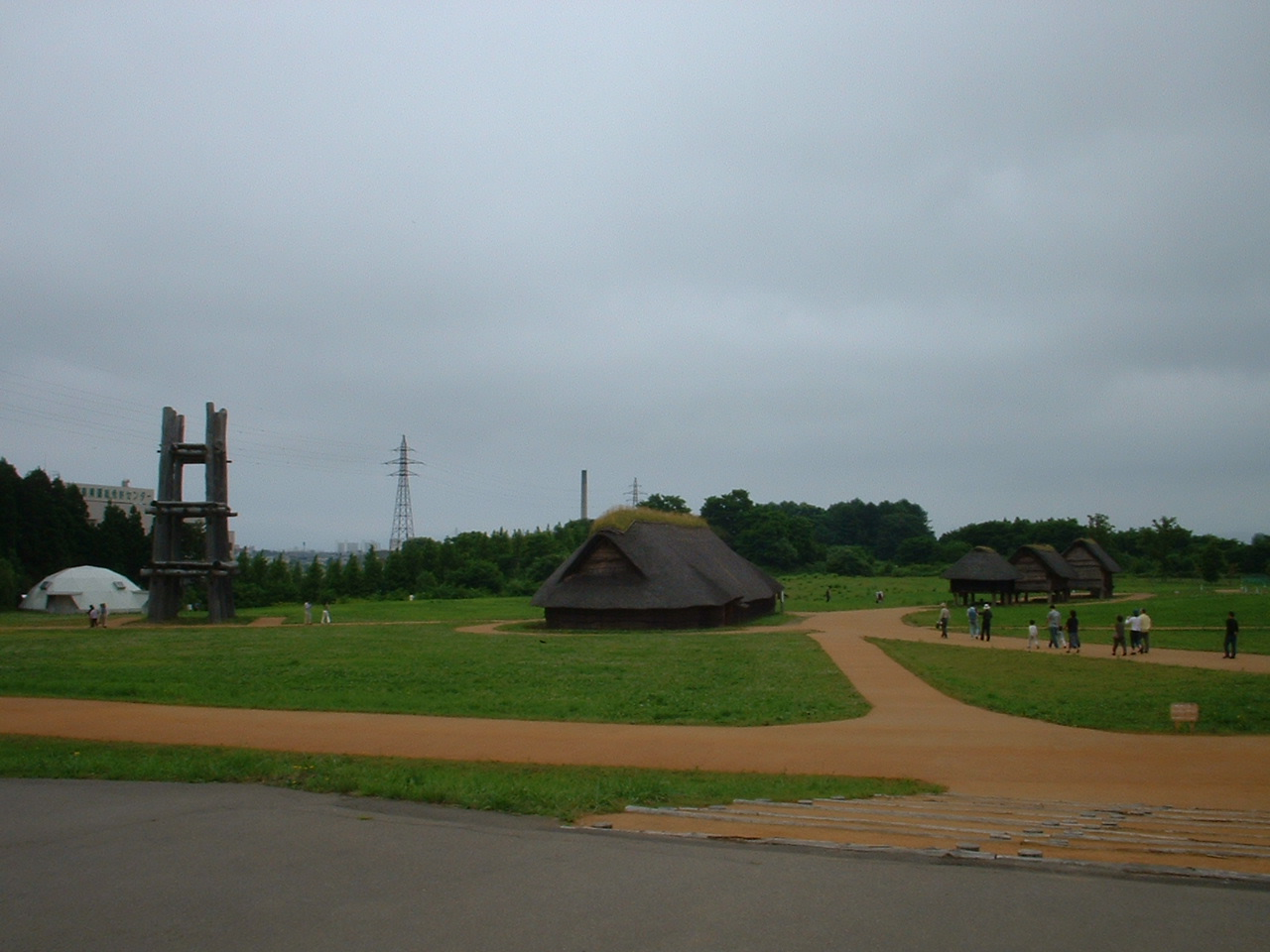
Sannai-Maruyama Site

=== Pre-Tokugawa Period ===
The area has been settled extensively since prehistoric times, and numerous Jōmon period sites have been found by archaeologists, the most famous being the Sannai-Maruyama Site located just southwest of the city center dating to 5500–4000 BC, and the Komakino Site slightly farther south dating to around 4000 BC. The large scale of these settlements revolutionized theories on Jōmon period civilization.

=== Later history ===
During the Heian period, the area was part of the holdings of the Northern Fujiwara clan, but remained inhabited by the Emishi people well into the historic period. After the fall of the Northern Fujiwara in the Kamakura period, the territory was part of the domain assigned to the Nambu clan, and into the Sengoku period, it came under the control of the rival Tsugaru clan, whose main castle was located in Namioka. After the start of the Edo period, what would become the core of present-day Aomori was a minor port settlement in the Hirosaki Domain called Utō (善知鳥村, Utō-mura).

The town was rebuilt in 1626 under orders of the daimyō, Tsugaru Nobuhira and renamed "Aomori", but this name did not come into common use until after 1783; however, the historical accuracy of this claim is debated since there is no written material from the time to definitively connect Utō to Aomori. Some evidence even claims that Aomori and Utō co-existed in different parts of the city in its current state. It was not until 1909 that a local scholar claimed that the village of Utō became Aomori.

After the Meiji Restoration, the feudal domains were abolished and replaced with prefectures, of which a total of six were initially created in the territory of modern Aomori Prefecture. These were merged into the short-lived Hirosaki Prefecture in July 1871. However, due to the historic enmity between the former Tsugaru territories in the west and the former Nambu territories in the east, the prefectural capital was relocated from Hirosaki to the more centrally located Aomori immediately after the merger and the prefecture was renamed Aomori Prefecture on 23 September 1871. However, the municipality of Aomori was not given town status within Higashitsugaru District until 1 April 1889, with the establishment of the modern municipalities system. It was later designated as a city on 1 April 1898.

The Hokkaidō Colonization Office began operations of a ferry service from Aomori to Hakodate in Hokkaido from 1872. In September 1891, Aomori was connected with Tokyo by rail with the opening of the Tōhoku Main Line. The Ōu Main Line running along the Sea of Japan coast opened in December 1894. The development of modern Aomori was primarily due to its prefectural capital status and the singular importance as the terminus of these rail lines and the Seikan Ferry, which officially opened in 1908. The 8th Division of the Imperial Japanese Army were stationed in Aomori from 1896. In the winter of 1902, 199 of 210 soldiers on a military cold-weather readiness exercise perished while attempting to cross the Hakkōda Mountains from Aomori to Towada in what was later called the Hakkōda Mountains incident.

Much of the town burned down in a large fire on 3 May 1910. The port facilities were expanded in 1924, and the city received its first bus services in 1926. Japan Air Transport began scheduled air services from 1937.

Towards the final stages of World War II, on the night of 28–29 July 1945, Aomori was subject to an air raid as part of the strategic bombing campaign waged by the United States against military and civilian targets and population centers during the Japan home islands campaign. The 28–29 July bombing claimed 1,767 lives and destroyed 88% of the city.

In the post-war period, Aomori was rebuilt as the local political and commercial center. The Tsugaru Line railway opened between Aomori Station and Kanita Station in 1951. Aomori Airport was opened in 1964 in nearby Namioka. The city was connected to Tokyo by highway in 1979 with the opening of the Tōhoku Expressway. Construction began on a new airport within the city of Aomori in 1982. Aomori's landmark pyramidal Aomori Prefecture Tourist Center opened in 1986. The new airport was completed on 19 July 1987. On 1 October 2002, Aomori was proclaimed a core city, granting it an increased level of local autonomy.

On 1 April 2005, Aomori absorbed the town of Namioka to create the new and expanded city of Aomori; but lost a portion of Namioka to the town of Fujisaki (from Minamitsugaru District) on 1 September 2007.

== Geography ==
Aomori is located in central Aomori Prefecture, the northernmost prefecture of Honshu. It is located in the northeastern part of the Tsugaru region, which refers to the western half of the prefecture, and is centered on Aomori Plain, facing Aomori Bay, a branch bay of Mutsu Bay, to the north, and the Hakkōda and Higashidake Mountains, which are the northern end of the Ōu Mountains to the south to the east. Among other smaller rivers, the city has two large rivers flowing through it, the Komagome River and its tributary, the Arakawa River. Parts of the city in the southeast are within the borders of Towada-Hachimantai National Park and is a tourist destination throughout the four seasons. In the northeast is Asamushi-Natsudomari Prefectural Natural Park. There are many hot springs in the city, including Sukayu Onsen at the foot of Mt. Hakkōda and Asamushi Onsen on the coast.

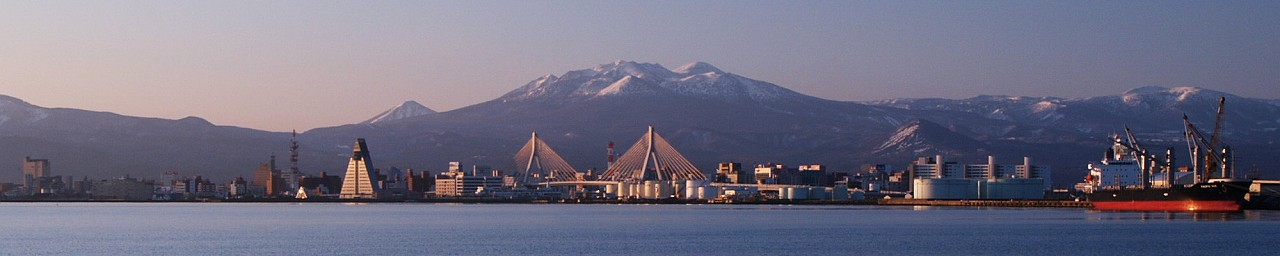
View of Aomori from Aomori Bay with Hakkōda Mountains

=== Surrounding municipalities ===
Aomori Prefecture

- Fujisaki
- Goshogawara
- Hirakawa
- Hiranai
- Itayanagi
- Kuroishi
- Shichinohe
- Towada
- Yomogita

== Climate ==
Like most of the Tōhoku region, Aomori has a humid temperate climate with warm summers, and cold, though not extreme, winters. The city has a cold, humid continental climate (Köppen Dfa) closely bordering the humid subtropical climate (Köppen Cfa) using the 0.0 °C (32.0 °F) isotherm with both January and February monthly averages being too cold to be of the latter, characterized by warm, short summers and long, cold winters with heavy snowfall. The average annual temperature in Aomori is 10.7 °C (51.3 °F). The average annual rainfall is 1,285 mm (50.6 in) with September as the wettest month. The temperatures are highest on average in August, at around 23.5 °C (74.3 °F), and lowest in January, at around −2.1 °C (28.2 °F).

Aomori and the surrounding areas are known for having the heaviest snowfall in the world. In 2016, AccuWeather ranked Aomori City as the snowiest city in the world. In February 1945, the city recorded a maximum snow cover of 209 cm (82 in), but the record low of −24.7 °C (−12 °F) was recorded 14 years earlier. In contrast, Sapporo's heaviest snowfall which occurred in 1939 was 164 cm (65 in), and Wakkanai which is located further north has recorded similar maxima. The particularly heavy snow is caused by several winds that collide around the city and make the air rise and cool, resulting in quick, thick cloud formation followed by intense precipitation.

In summer, a cool wind called "Yamase" often blows from the east, which sometimes results in abnormally cool weather and poor harvests. Additionally, thick fogs from the Oyashio Current are often observed in mountainous areas in the summer. Due to this fog, flights to Aomori Airport are often cancelled.

Climate data for Aomori (elevation 2.8 m, 1991–2020 normals, extremes 1882–present)
Month	Jan	Feb	Mar	Apr	May	Jun	Jul	Aug	Sep	Oct	Nov	Dec	Year
Record high °C (°F)	13.5 (56.3)	19.4 (66.9)	21.4 (70.5)	28.3 (82.9)	33.6 (92.5)	33.5 (92.3)	36.0 (96.8)	36.7 (98.1)	36.1 (97.0)	30.5 (86.9)	24.1 (75.4)	21.1 (70.0)	36.7 (98.1)
Mean maximum °C (°F)	7.5 (45.5)	9.6 (49.3)	15.7 (60.3)	22.6 (72.7)	27.1 (80.8)	28.9 (84.0)	32.4 (90.3)	33.4 (92.1)	30.9 (87.6)	24.5 (76.1)	19.7 (67.5)	12.1 (53.8)	34.1 (93.4)
Mean daily maximum °C (°F)	1.8 (35.2)	2.7 (36.9)	6.8 (44.2)	13.7 (56.7)	18.8 (65.8)	22.1 (71.8)	26.0 (78.8)	27.8 (82.0)	24.5 (76.1)	18.3 (64.9)	11.2 (52.2)	4.5 (40.1)	14.9 (58.8)
Daily mean °C (°F)	−0.9 (30.4)	−0.4 (31.3)	2.8 (37.0)	8.5 (47.3)	13.7 (56.7)	17.6 (63.7)	21.8 (71.2)	23.5 (74.3)	19.9 (67.8)	13.5 (56.3)	7.2 (45.0)	1.4 (34.5)	10.7 (51.3)
Mean daily minimum °C (°F)	−3.5 (25.7)	−3.3 (26.1)	−0.8 (30.6)	4.1 (39.4)	9.4 (48.9)	14.1 (57.4)	18.6 (65.5)	20.0 (68.0)	15.8 (60.4)	9.1 (48.4)	3.4 (38.1)	−1.4 (29.5)	7.1 (44.8)
Mean minimum °C (°F)	−8.0 (17.6)	−7.7 (18.1)	−5.6 (21.9)	−0.8 (30.6)	4.0 (39.2)	9.5 (49.1)	14.1 (57.4)	15.0 (59.0)	9.7 (49.5)	3.4 (38.1)	−2.2 (28.0)	−6.1 (21.0)	−8.8 (16.2)
Record low °C (°F)	−23.5 (−10.3)	−24.7 (−12.5)	−18.4 (−1.1)	−12.2 (10.0)	−1.4 (29.5)	4.0 (39.2)	6.5 (43.7)	8.9 (48.0)	3.0 (37.4)	−2.4 (27.7)	−12.1 (10.2)	−20.6 (−5.1)	−24.7 (−12.5)
Average precipitation mm (inches)	139.9 (5.51)	99.0 (3.90)	75.2 (2.96)	68.7 (2.70)	76.7 (3.02)	75.0 (2.95)	129.5 (5.10)	142.0 (5.59)	133.0 (5.24)	119.2 (4.69)	137.4 (5.41)	155.2 (6.11)	1,350.7 (53.18)
Average snowfall cm (inches)	195 (77)	141 (56)	64 (25)	4 (1.6)	0 (0)	0 (0)	0 (0)	0 (0)	0 (0)	0 (0)	23 (9.1)	143 (56)	567 (223)
Average precipitation days (≥ 0.5 mm)	24.0	20.0	16.7	12.2	11.3	9.5	10.2	10.8	11.6	14.6	18.9	23.6	183.3
Average snowy days	29.6	26.1	22.1	5.7	0.0	0.0	0.0	0.0	0.0	0.2	10.2	26.0	119.5
Average relative humidity (%)	78	76	70	65	71	78	80	78	76	73	73	78	75
Mean monthly sunshine hours	48.5	72.3	126.0	179.1	201.4	180.0	161.4	178.0	162.4	144.4	85.4	50.4	1,589.2
Source: Japan Meteorological Agency (normals: 1991–2020, extremes: 1882–present)

Climate data for Aomori Ōtani, Aomori (elevation 198 m, 2003–2020 normals, extremes 2003–present)
Month	Jan	Feb	Mar	Apr	May	Jun	Jul	Aug	Sep	Oct	Nov	Dec	Year
Record high °C (°F)	10.5 (50.9)	16.0 (60.8)	16.6 (61.9)	26.8 (80.2)	31.5 (88.7)	31.2 (88.2)	34.7 (94.5)	35.7 (96.3)	34.8 (94.6)	27.0 (80.6)	22.1 (71.8)	17.2 (63.0)	35.7 (96.3)
Mean daily maximum °C (°F)	−0.3 (31.5)	0.7 (33.3)	4.6 (40.3)	11.4 (52.5)	18.2 (64.8)	21.8 (71.2)	25.1 (77.2)	26.7 (80.1)	23.1 (73.6)	16.6 (61.9)	9.7 (49.5)	2.6 (36.7)	13.4 (56.1)
Daily mean °C (°F)	−2.9 (26.8)	−2.3 (27.9)	0.9 (33.6)	6.4 (43.5)	12.4 (54.3)	16.4 (61.5)	20.3 (68.5)	22.0 (71.6)	17.9 (64.2)	11.5 (52.7)	5.5 (41.9)	−0.4 (31.3)	9.0 (48.2)
Mean daily minimum °C (°F)	−6.3 (20.7)	−6.3 (20.7)	−3.2 (26.2)	1.0 (33.8)	6.6 (43.9)	11.5 (52.7)	16.2 (61.2)	17.7 (63.9)	12.7 (54.9)	5.9 (42.6)	0.9 (33.6)	−3.9 (25.0)	4.4 (39.9)
Record low °C (°F)	−17.6 (0.3)	−17.7 (0.1)	−14.6 (5.7)	−6.9 (19.6)	−2.6 (27.3)	1.2 (34.2)	6.5 (43.7)	7.9 (46.2)	2.9 (37.2)	−2.8 (27.0)	−7.9 (17.8)	−14.0 (6.8)	−17.7 (0.1)
Average precipitation mm (inches)	87.4 (3.44)	66.2 (2.61)	54.7 (2.15)	73.0 (2.87)	64.2 (2.53)	72.0 (2.83)	130.9 (5.15)	142.5 (5.61)	141.0 (5.55)	132.1 (5.20)	130.1 (5.12)	110.2 (4.34)	1,192.7 (46.96)
Average precipitation days (≥ 1.0 mm)	19.5	14.7	12.7	11.3	9.5	8.1	9.8	10.4	10.7	13.5	16.6	20.1	155.4
Source: Japan Meteorological Agency (normals: 2003–2020, extremes: 2003–present)

Climate data for Sukayu, Aomori (elevation 890 m, 1991–2020 normals, extremes 1976–present)
Month	Jan	Feb	Mar	Apr	May	Jun	Jul	Aug	Sep	Oct	Nov	Dec	Year
Record high °C (°F)	6.5 (43.7)	11.8 (53.2)	15.1 (59.2)	21.7 (71.1)	25.9 (78.6)	27.0 (80.6)	28.9 (84.0)	30.8 (87.4)	28.7 (83.7)	22.4 (72.3)	18.8 (65.8)	12.0 (53.6)	30.8 (87.4)
Mean daily maximum °C (°F)	−5.1 (22.8)	−4.3 (24.3)	−0.2 (31.6)	6.4 (43.5)	13.1 (55.6)	17.6 (63.7)	21.1 (70.0)	21.9 (71.4)	17.7 (63.9)	11.4 (52.5)	4.5 (40.1)	−2.2 (28.0)	8.5 (47.3)
Daily mean °C (°F)	−7.5 (18.5)	−6.9 (19.6)	−3.5 (25.7)	2.8 (37.0)	9.1 (48.4)	13.6 (56.5)	17.7 (63.9)	18.4 (65.1)	14.1 (57.4)	7.7 (45.9)	1.2 (34.2)	−4.9 (23.2)	5.2 (41.4)
Mean daily minimum °C (°F)	−10.0 (14.0)	−9.8 (14.4)	−6.8 (19.8)	−0.8 (30.6)	5.1 (41.2)	9.8 (49.6)	14.6 (58.3)	15.3 (59.5)	10.7 (51.3)	4.2 (39.6)	−2.0 (28.4)	−7.6 (18.3)	1.9 (35.4)
Record low °C (°F)	−17.8 (0.0)	−17.3 (0.9)	−14.9 (5.2)	−10.9 (12.4)	−4.4 (24.1)	0.5 (32.9)	5.0 (41.0)	7.6 (45.7)	0.0 (32.0)	−4.8 (23.4)	−13.8 (7.2)	−18.0 (−0.4)	−18.0 (−0.4)
Average precipitation mm (inches)	117.7 (4.63)	80.1 (3.15)	82.4 (3.24)	106.0 (4.17)	117.0 (4.61)	136.1 (5.36)	178.1 (7.01)	211.0 (8.31)	223.0 (8.78)	218.0 (8.58)	195.6 (7.70)	167.7 (6.60)	1,832.7 (72.14)
Average snowfall cm (inches)	454 (179)	341 (134)	234 (92)	97 (38)	40 (16)	2 (0.8)	0 (0)	0 (0)	0 (0)	11 (4.3)	143 (56)	376 (148)	1,706 (672)
Average precipitation days (≥ 1.0 mm)	20.9	17.3	16.6	13.2	12.0	11.4	12.6	13.1	13.8	15.9	19.0	22.0	190.2
Mean monthly sunshine hours	11.8	22.5	53.5	112.9	176.4	158.4	117.8	128.4	115.0	104.3	52.9	16.8	1,069.4
Source: Japan Meteorological Agency (normals: 1991–2020, extremes: 1976–present)

== Demographics ==
A person living in or from Aomori is referred to as an Aomorian. Per Japanese census data, the population of Aomori has remained relatively steady over the past 40 years.

Historical population
Year	Pop.	±% p.a.
1920	48,941	—
1930	77,103	+4.65%
1940	99,065	+2.54%
1950	106,417	+0.72%
1960	235,116	+8.25%
1970	261,743	+1.08%
1980	309,768	+1.70%
1990	308,782	−0.03%
2000	318,732	+0.32%
2010	299,520	−0.62%
2020	275,340	−0.84%
2023	264,945	−1.27%

== Government ==
Aomori has a mayor-council form of government with a directly elected mayor and a unicameral city legislature of 35 members. The city also contributes 10 members of the 48 member Aomori Prefectural Assembly. In terms of national politics, the city falls within the Aomori 1st district, a single-member constituency of the House of Representatives in the national Diet of Japan, which also includes the city of Mutsu, the Higashitsugaru District, the Shimokita District, and the northern half of the Kamikita District.

== Economy ==
Aomori serves as the regional commercial center for central Aomori Prefecture. Agriculture and commercial fishing form only 4% of the city economy, with manufacturing forming 16.2% and the service sector forming 78.2%.

== Education ==
Aomori is the only prefectural capital in Japan which has no national university, instead, nearby Hirosaki became the site for the prefecture's highest educational facility. The city has 45 public elementary schools and 19 public junior high schools operated by the city government, as well as two private junior high schools. The city has 10 public high schools operated by the Aomori Prefectural Board of Education and three private high schools. The prefecture also operates eight special education schools for the handicapped.

=== Universities and colleges ===
- Aomori Public University
- Aomori University of Health and Welfare
- Aomori University
- Aomori Chuo Gakuin University
- Aomori Akenohoshi Junior College
- Aomori Chuo Junior College

=== High schools ===
- Aomori Prefectural Aomori High School
- Aomori Prefectural Aomori Chūō High School
- Aomori Prefectural Aomori Higashi High School
- Aomori Prefectural Aomori Kita High School
- Aomori Prefectural Aomori Hokuto High School
- Aomori Prefectural Aomori Kōgyō High School
- Aomori Prefectural Aomori Minami High School
- Aomori Prefectural Aomori Nishi High School
- Aomori Prefectural Aomori Shōgyō High School
- Aomori Prefectural Aomori Toyama High School
- Aomori Akenohoshi High School
- Aomori Yamada High School
- Tōō Gakuen High School

=== Junior high schools ===
- Aburakawa Junior High School
- Arakawa Junior High School
- Asamushi Junior High School
- Furukawa Junior High School
- Higashi Junior High School
- Kita Junior High School
- Koda Junior High School
- Minami junior High School
- Namioka Junior High School
- Namiuchi Junior High School
- Nishi Junior High School
- Okidate Junior High School
- Sannai Junior High School
- Shinjo Junior High School
- Takada Junior High School
- Toyama Junior High School
- Tsukuda Junior High School
- Tsukurimichi Junior High School
- Tsutsui Junior High School
- Uramachi Junior High School
- Yokouchi Junior High School

== Transportation ==
=== Airport ===
- Aomori Airport - (established in 1964 with international flights from 1995) is about a 35-minute drive from the city center, with a bus service available. There are daily flights to Tokyo, Osaka, Nagoya and Sapporo. There are also international flights to Seoul and Taipei.
- Odate–Noshiro Airport - is located quite far from the city centre as it was located in Northern Akita Prefecture. It is solely used by All Nippon Airways service to Tokyo as the airline did not served the Tokyo-Aomori route.

=== Railways ===
Aomori Station has been the main station of the city since 1891. The two trunk lines of the Tōhoku region, the Tōhoku Main Line (now the Aoimori Railway) and the Ōu Main Line, terminated at Aomori Station and continued to Hakodate by the Seikan Ferry. In 1988, Seikan Tunnel replaced the ferry's role as the connector of Honshu and Hokkaido's rail networks, but the station still functioned as the connecting point between main line trains and trains for the Aomori-Hakodate section.

The Tōhoku Shinkansen opened in 2010 with a new terminal at Shin-Aomori Station. The Shinkansen provides high-speed service between Shin-Aomori, Hachinohe, Morioka, Sendai and Tokyo. East Japan Railway Company (JR East) – Tōhoku Shinkansen

- Shin-Aomori

JR East – Ōu Main Line

- Aomori - Shin-Aomori - Tsugaru-Shinjō - Tsurugasaka - Daishaka - Namioka

JR East – Tsugaru Line

- Aomori - Aburakawa - Tsugaru-Miyata - Okunai - Hidariseki - Ushirogata - Nakasawa

Aoimori Railway Line

- Aomori - Higashi-Aomori - Koyanagi - Yadamae - Nonai - Asamushi-Onsen

=== Highways ===
- Tōhoku Expressway – Namioka Interchange – Aomori Interchange
- Aomori Expressway – Aomori Interchange – Aomori-chūō Interchange – Aomori-higashi Interchange
- Michinoku Toll Road
- Tsugaru Expressway – Namioka Interchange
- National Route 4
- National Route 7
  - Aomori Belt Highway
  - Aomori West Bypass
- National Route 45 (unsigned)
- National Route 101
- National Route 103
- National Route 280
- National Route 394

=== Seaports ===
- Port of Aomori – The Seikan Ferry and Tsugaru Kaikyō Ferry operates ferries to Hakodate. It takes about four hours to go by ferry from Aomori to Hakodate. From 1908 to 1988 the ferry served as the primary transport between the island of Honshū and the northern island of Hokkaido. In March 1988, the Seikan Tunnel opened up, traveling under the Tsugaru Strait, this quickly replaced the slow-moving ferry as the primary transportation between the two islands.

== Sports ==
Aomori has hosted several international curling events, two in 2003 (including the Asian Winter Games), and the local women's "Team Aomori" was selected to represent Japan at the 2006 Winter Olympics in Turin, Italy and at the 2010 Winter Olympics in Vancouver, British Columbia, Canada. From 17 to 25 March 2007, Aomori hosted the World Women's Curling Championships.

=== Sports facilities ===
- Aomori City Baseball Stadium, otherwise known as Gappo Park Stadium
- Aomori Stadium
- Aomori Velodrome

=== Sports teams ===
- ReinMeer Aomori

== Parks and recreation ==
Gappo Park is Aomori's oldest public park and its most iconic green space. Located to the east of the center of the city, it contains a public beach, water gardens, various ornamental trees, and the Aomori City Baseball Stadium. Other parks in the city include the centrally located Aoimori Park,Aoimori Central Park, and Nogiwa Park.

== Local attractions ==
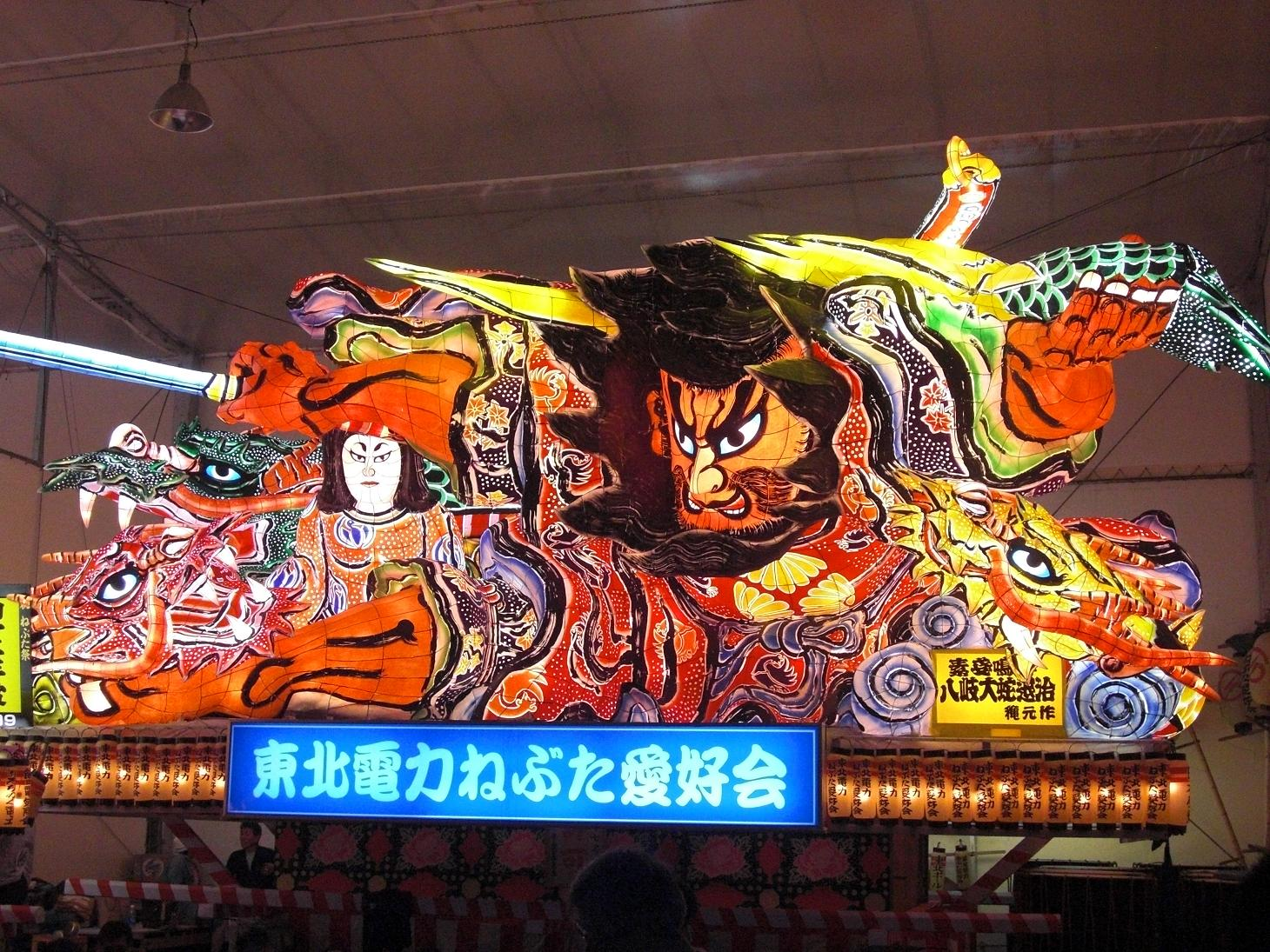
A float from Aomori's Nebuta Festival

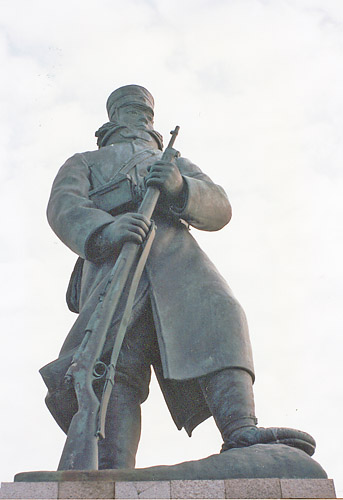
The Memorial Statue of the Hakkoda Death March portrays Fusanosuke Gotō

Aomori Nebuta Matsuri is a famous festival performed from 2–7 August annually and is listed as one of the 100 Soundscapes of Japan by the Japanese Ministry of the Environment. Besides this, major attractions of Aomori include ruins, museums, and mountains. The Hakkōda Mountains have good locations for trekking with hot spas (onsen), such as Sukayu Onsen.

- Aomori Bay Bridge
- Aomori City Forestry Museum
- Aomori City History and Folk Arts Museum
- Aomori Museum of Art
- Aomori Prefectural Museum
- Asamushi Aquarium
- Asamushi Onsen
- Komakino Site, a National Historic Site
- Munakata Shiko Memorial Museum of Art
- Namioka Castle ruins, A National Historic Site
- Nebuta Museum Wa Rasse
- Ōmori Katsuyama Site, a National Historic Site
- Sannai-Maruyama Site, a Special National Historic Site
- Seiryū-ji
- Shinmachi Street
- Sukayu Onsen
- Takayashikidate Site, a National Historic Site
- Uramachi Shinmeigū

== Sister cities ==
- Hakodate, Hokkaido – since 1989. Aomori and Hakodate share a "twin cities" relationship referred to as the "Seikan Economic and Cultural Area".
- Kecskemét, Bács-Kiskun County, Hungary – since August 1994
- Pyeongtaek, Gyeonggi-do, South Korea – since 1995
- Dalian, Liaoning, People's Republic of China – since December 2004
- Hsinchu County, Taiwan – friendship city since October 2014

== Notable people ==
- Noriko Awaya, singer
- Takaharu Furukawa, archer
- Takanori Hatakeyama, boxer
- Yuji Hayami, science-fiction writer
- Shigeru Izumiya, entertainer
- Ibuki Kido, voice actress
- Yaho Kitabatake, children's fiction writer
- Ichirō Kojima, photographer
- Daimaou Kosaka, comedian
- Daisuke Matsuzaka, baseball player
- Keizo Miura, skier
- Yuichiro Miura, skier
- Shiko Munakata, woodblock artist
- Kodai Naraoka, badminton player
- Ren Narita, wrestler
- Hitoshi Saito, judoka
- Kyoichi Sawada, photographer
- Yoshie Shiratori, fugitive and four-time prison escapee
- Akimitsu Takagi, crime fiction writer
- Bushuyama Takashi, sumo wrestler
- Kiyoshi Tanabe, professional boxer
- Shūji Terayama, modern artist
- Takanosato Toshihide, sumo wrestler
- Daigo Umehara, fighting game player
- Ryushi Yanagisawa, wrestler and mixed martial artist
- Akiko Yano, singer-songwriter
