= Aomori Bay Bridge =

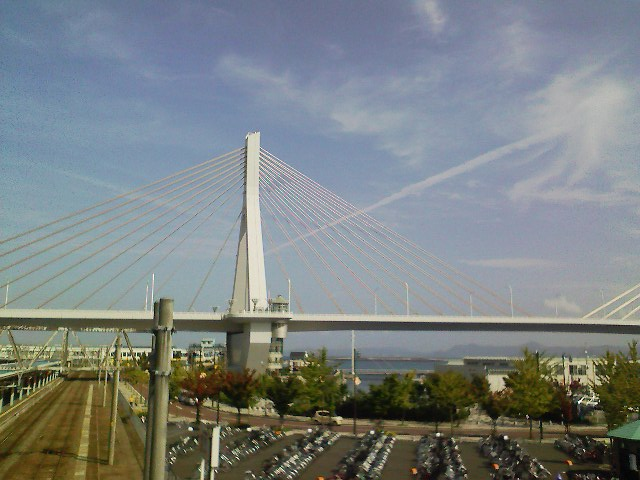
- The Aomori Bay Bridge viewed from Aomori Station
- Coordinates: 40°49′49″N 140°44′12″E
- Carries: Four lanes of automobile traffic for Aomori Port Road Route 2
- Locale: Aomori City, Aomori Prefecture (Aomori Bay–Aomori Port)

Characteristics
- Design: Inverted Y, Precast concrete Cable-stay (main span)
- Total length: 1219.0 m (center span 498 m, land-side spans 721 m)
- Width: 25 m

History
- Engineering design by: Kaihatsu-Toranomon Consultant Co., LTD.
- Opened: To limited traffic in July 1992, to all traffic in July 1994

Location
- Interactive map of Aomori Bay Bridge

The Aomori Bay Bridge (青森ベイブリッジ, Aomori Bei Burijji) is a cable-stayed bridge in Aomori, Aomori Prefecture, Japan. It was constructed in order to alleviate cargo ship traffic. It is a very notable part of Aomori's skyline.

== Details ==
The Aomori Bay Bridge is the longest bridge in the city of Aomori at 1219 meters. It's the second longest bridge in Aomori Prefecture after the 1323.7 meter Hachinohe Ōhashi Bridge. Previously the longest bridge in Aomori City was the 993.9 meter Aomori West Bypass overpass, it's now the third longest bridge in Aomori Prefecture.

Emphasis was placed on the aesthetics of the bridge, causing the total cost of construction to come to approximately 27 billion yen (¥) in comparison to only ¥8.9 billion for the longer Hachinohe Ōhashi Bridge. An example of the emphasis on the bridge's appearance is the emblazoning of the letter "A", for "Aomori", at various places such as the base of the bridge and in the shape of the suspension cables. The use of the letter "A" continues on from the nearby Aomori Prefecture Sightseeing Products Mansion, or ASPAM Building, which is built in the shape of a triangle so that it would look like the initial "A".

The bridge's main towers are made from high strength concrete.

In response to the bridge's long standing problems with ice in the winter months, a plan was made to lay pipes circulating sea water under the road surface to melt the ice. However, due to problems related to the cost and construction time, only one section was able to be completed. As yet there are no indications of when the system will be implemented over the remainder of the bridge as originally planned. Even so, since the installation of the system the number of traffic accidents has drastically decreased.

== Development ==
- 1982 – Project created (Project name: Aomori Port Improvement Project, planned to bridge a 1993-meter section)
- 1985 – Construction begins on the bridge.
- 1992 – July – Tentatively, two lanes are opened for traffic. The project receives the Doboku Gakkai Tanaka Award presented by the Japan Society of Civil Engineers for outstanding bridge construction projects.
- 1994 – July – All four lanes are opened for traffic.
- 2002 – Projects to increase earthquake resistance and to install a de-icing system begin. (Project name: Aomori Port Area Bridges (Earthquake Proofing), total budget of approximately 2.5 million yen.)
- 2004 – December - De-icing systems begin being used on 442 meters of the downhill part of the Okidate side (West side) of the bridge.
- 2006 – February – De-icing systems begin being used on 138 meters near the intersection of the Hon-machi side (East side). 253 meters of de-icing systems are planned to begin being used from the Hon-machi side to the Okidate side during the winter of 2006.

== Major Connecting Roads ==
- Aomori Prefectural Route 18, Aomori Port Route (commonly referred to as Yanagi-machi Avenue)
- Port Road Route 1 (Western Road)
- Port Road Route 3 (Eastern Road)

== Surrounding area ==
- Aomori Station
- A-Factory
- Seikan Connector Ferry Boat Memorial Ship “Hakkōda-maru”
- Nebuta Museum Wa Rasse
- Aomori Prefecture Tourist Center “Asupamu”
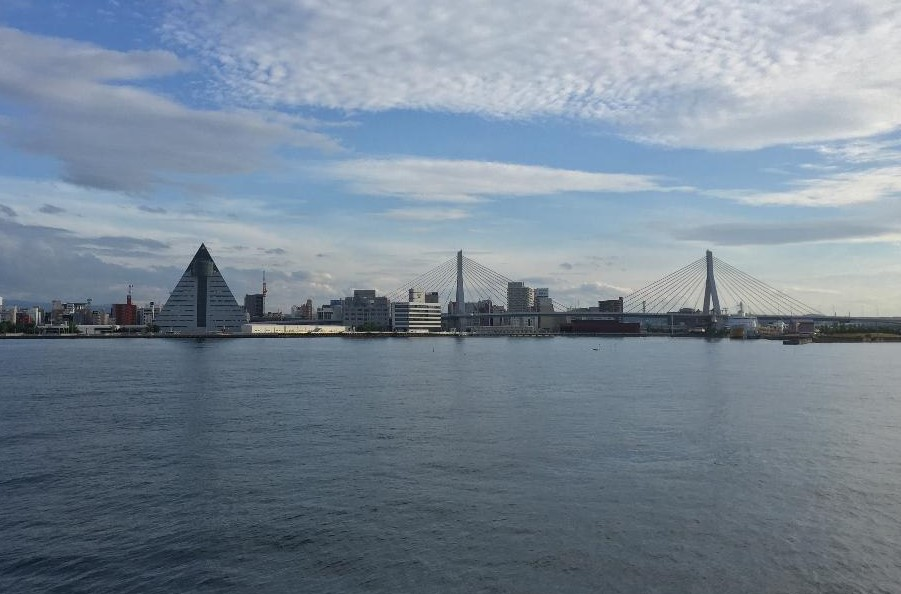

== See also ==
- Yokohama Bay Bridge, the inspiration for the name of the Aomori Bay Bridge
- Leonard P. Zakim Bunker Hill Memorial Bridge, a bridge in Boston, Massachusetts, USA very similar in appearance to the Aomori Bay Bridge.
