= Ōmori Katsuyama Site =

- 大森勝山遺跡 (Japanese)
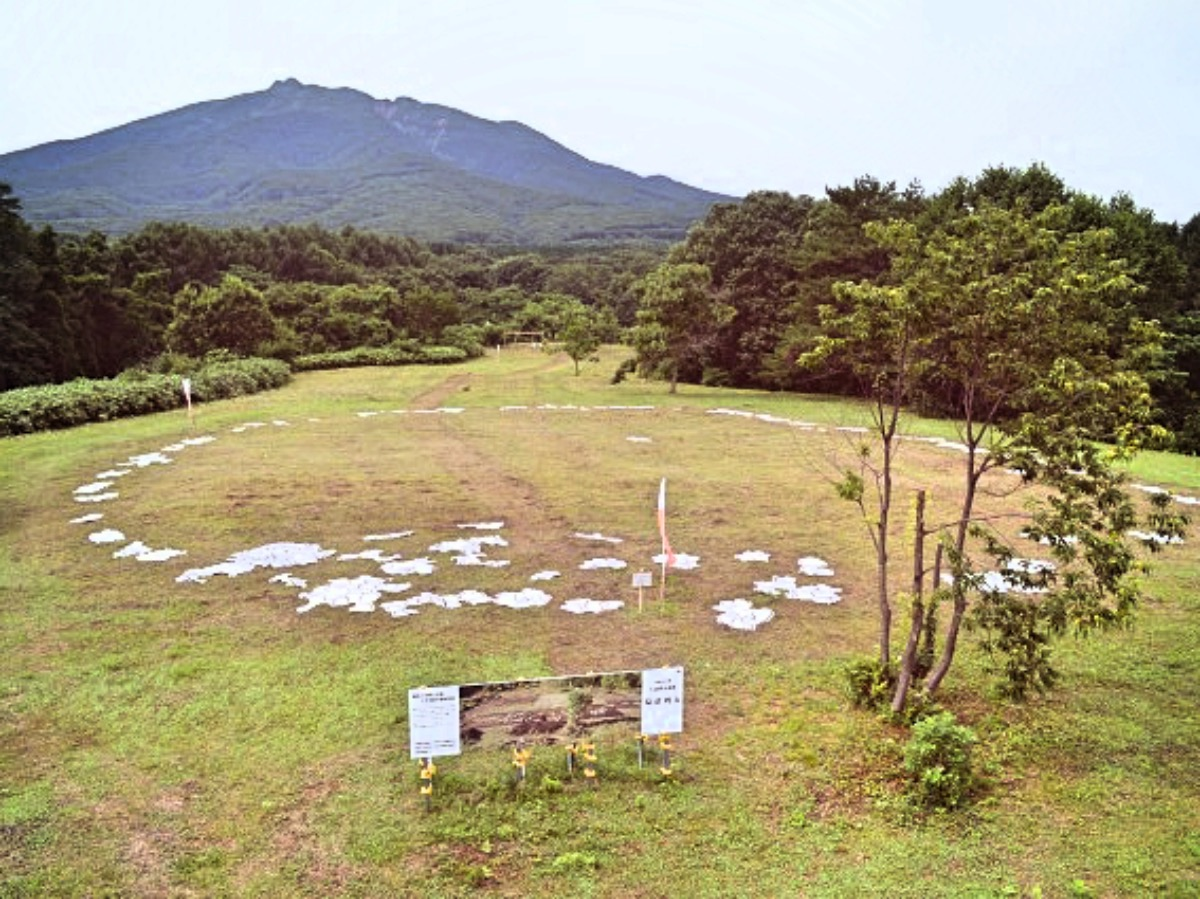
- Omori-Katsuyama Stone Circle

- Location within Aomori Prefecture Location within Japan
- 40°41′56″N 140°21′30″E
- Type: stone circle, settlement
- Periods: Jōmon period
- Location: Hirosaki, Aomori, Japan
- Region: Tōhoku region

History
- Built: 2,000 - 1,500 BC

Site notes
- Area: 85,154.8 square meters (21.04 acres)
- Excavation dates: 1959-1963, 2006
- Discovered: 1959
- Public access: Yes (no facilities at site)

The Ōmori Katsuyama Site (大森勝山遺跡, Ōmori Katsuyama iseki) is an archaeological site in the city of Hirosaki, Aomori Prefecture, in the Tōhoku region of northern Japan that contains the ruins of a late Jōmon period settlement dating to approximately 2,000–1,500 BC. The remains were designated a National Historic Site in 2012 by the Japanese government.

== Site ==
The site is located at the tip of a 145-meter-high (476 ft), tongue-shaped hill on the northeastern side of the foot of Mount Iwaki in western Aomori Prefecture and was discovered during construction work in 1959. A rescue survey conducted over a three-year period found the remains of a large pit dwelling, at the time the largest to have been discovered in Japan, followed by a stone circle. the site was acquired by the government for preservation in 1961, but was not properly excavated until 2006.

=== Stone circle ===
The stone circle is elliptical, with a length of 48.5 meters (159 ft) and width of 39.1 meters (128 ft). It was constructed by leveling a hilltop, and then arranging 77 stones assemblies along the margin of an embankment. The stone assemblies consist of approximately 1200 pyroxene andesite stones, which were collected from the river that runs to the north and south of site. This arrangement of small stones marks an advancement of the techniques used at the earlier Komakino Site to the north, and dates it to the first half of the Final Jōmon period (approx. 1,000 BC). The circle is designed such that it is aligned to the point where the sun sets over the summit of Mount Iwaki on the winter solstice.

=== Artifacts ===
Jōmon pottery, clay objects, and stone tools and stone objects (arrowheads, spoons, etc.,) from the early phase of Final Jōmon Period unearthed at site bear designs similar to that found at Kamegaoka Stone Age Site. These included some 250 disk-like stone objects with a diameter of five to ten centimeters, made of the same pyroxene andesite as the stone circles, which presumably had some ritual significance in connection with the stone circle. Stone blades and burins have been found here that resemble artifacts from the Tarukishi site.

=== Pit dwelling ===
A large pit dwelling was located 100 meters (330 ft) southwest of the stone circle. It had a diameter of 13 meters (43 ft) with a hearth in the center.

The site has been submitted for inscription on the UNESCO World Heritage List as one of the Jōmon Archaeological Sites in Hokkaidō, Northern Tōhoku, and other regions.

== See also ==
- List of Historic Sites of Japan (Aomori)
