= Seiryū-ji =

Buddhist temple in Japan

Coordinates: 40°49′19″N 140°49′06″E

- 青龍寺
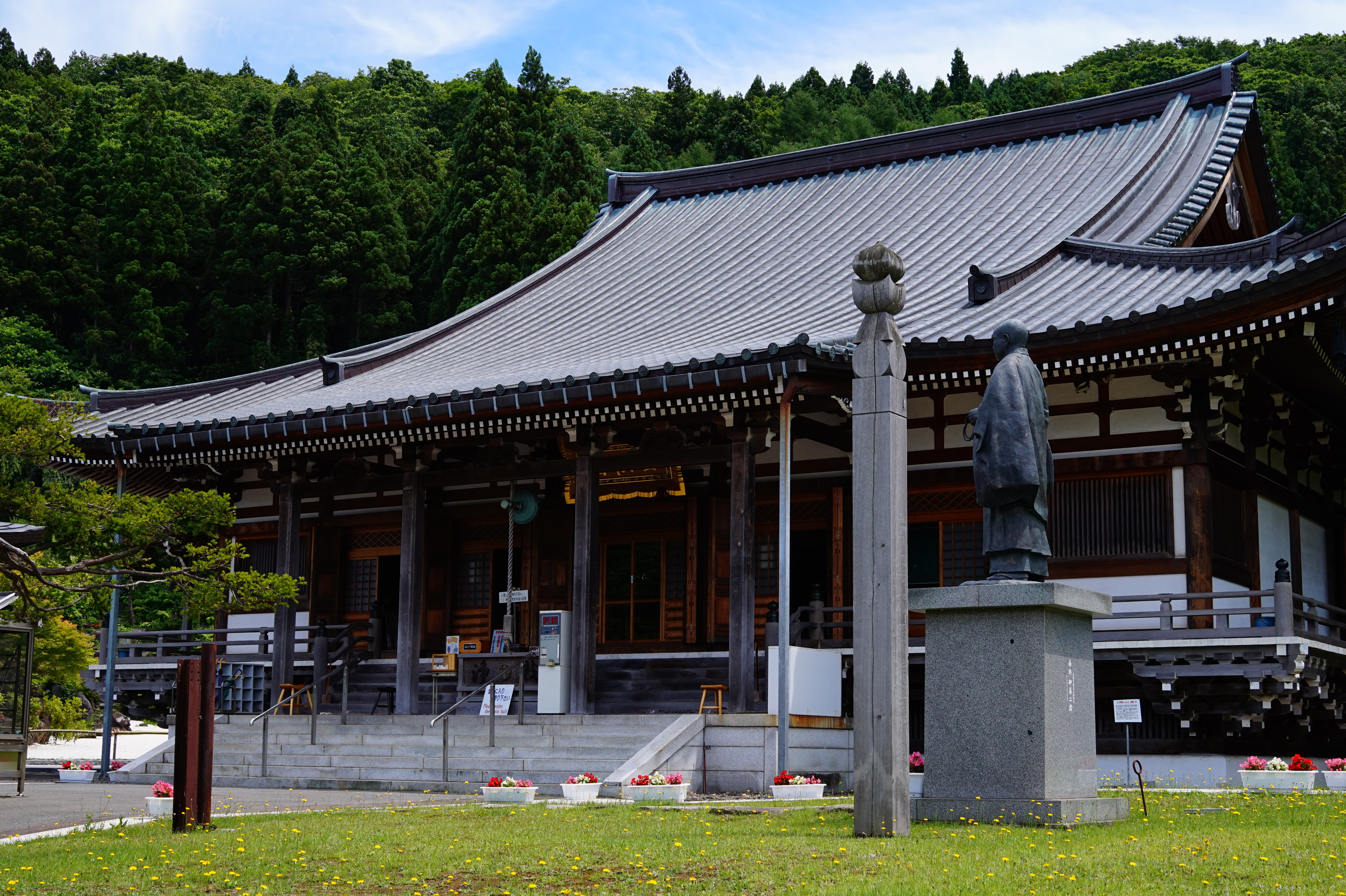

Religion
- Affiliation: Buddhism

Location
- Location: Yamazaki 45-2 Kuwabara, Aomori City, Aomori Prefecture
- Country: Japan
- Interactive map of Seiryū-ji

Architecture
- Completed: 1982

Website
- Official Website

Seiryū-ji (青龍寺) is a Kōyasan Betsuin (affiliate temple) located in Aomori, Aomori Prefecture. The temple was founded by a Great Acharya Ryūkou Oda (織田隆弘), who later built Shōwa Daibutsu (昭和大仏) in 1984. Roughly 21.35 meters in height, it is the tallest seated bronze figure of Buddha in Japan.

== See also ==
- List of tallest statues
