= Sukayu Onsen =

Hot spring in Aomori Prefecture, Japan

Sukayu Onsen 酸ヶ湯
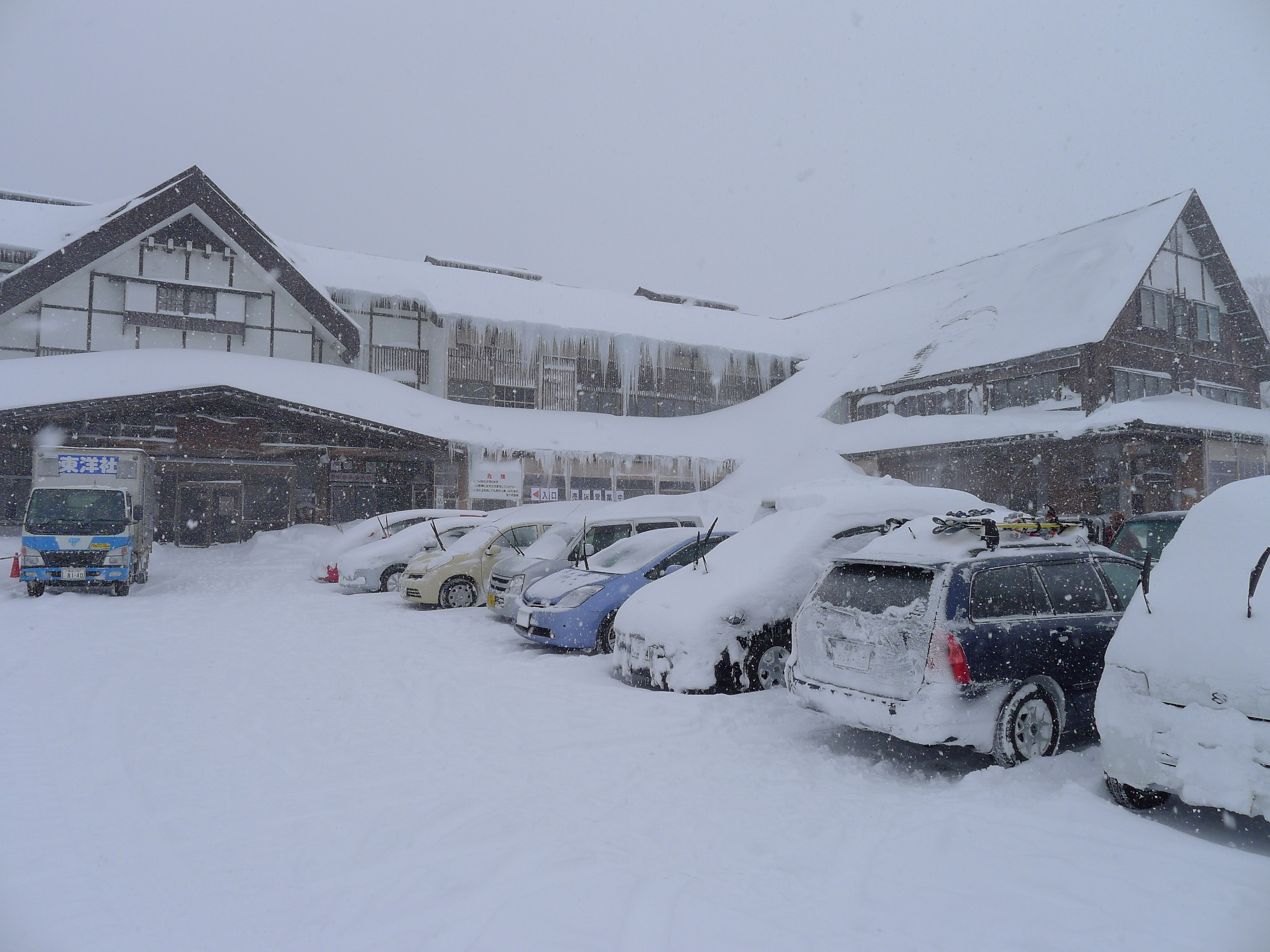
- Sukayu Onsen in the winter

- Location within Aomori Prefecture Location within Japan
- Location: Hakkōda Mountains, Towada-Hachimantai National Park, Aomori, Japan
- Coordinates: 40°39′03″N 140°51′01″E
- Elevation: 925 meters (3,035 ft)
- Type: varied
- Temperature: −10.4–22 °C (13.3–71.6 °F)

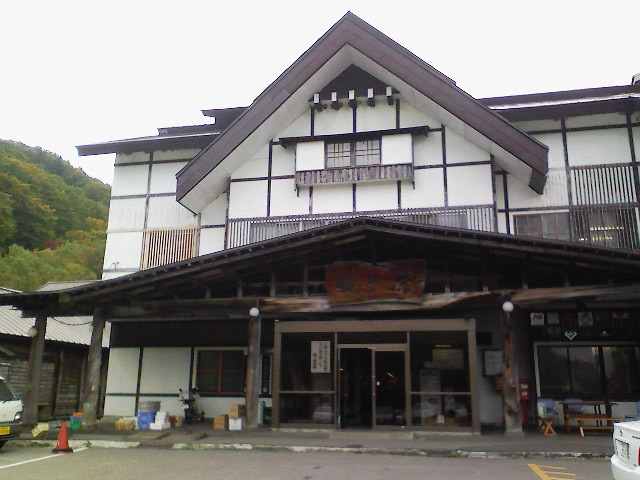
The main onsen building

Sukayu Onsen (酸ヶ湯, Sukayu) is an onsen (hot spring) in the Hakkōda Mountains in the city of Aomori, Aomori Prefecture in Japan. It is known for its "Sen-nin-buro" or "Bath of a thousand bathers", a large mixed gender public bath.

== Climate ==
Sukayu Onsen is the snowiest inhabited place on Earth with an average yearly snowfall of 17.6 m (58 ft) and a winter season record of 23.7 m (78 ft). It also holds the record of having the highest snow depth ever recorded at a JMA certified weather station of 566 cm (18.57 ft), recorded on February 26, 2013. Despite the extremely high snowfall, Sukayu Onsen is accessible by road all year round.

Sukayu Onsen, despite the incredibly high yearly snowfall, has a humid continental climate (Dfb), and is one of the coldest and snowiest inhabited places in Japan. Summers are generally short, but mild to warm with many rainy days. Winters are cold by Japanese standards and extremely snowy, due to the high elevation. Springs and Autumns can be highly variable, being rainy, snowy, cold, mild, sunny, or all kinds of weather in a week.

Climate data for Sukayu Onsen (1991−2020 normals, extremes 1976−present)
Month	Jan	Feb	Mar	Apr	May	Jun	Jul	Aug	Sep	Oct	Nov	Dec	Year
Record high °C (°F)	6.5 (43.7)	11.8 (53.2)	15.1 (59.2)	21.7 (71.1)	25.9 (78.6)	27.0 (80.6)	28.9 (84.0)	30.8 (87.4)	28.7 (83.7)	22.4 (72.3)	18.8 (65.8)	12.0 (53.6)	30.8 (87.4)
Mean daily maximum °C (°F)	−5.1 (22.8)	−4.3 (24.3)	−0.2 (31.6)	6.4 (43.5)	13.1 (55.6)	17.6 (63.7)	21.1 (70.0)	21.9 (71.4)	17.7 (63.9)	11.4 (52.5)	4.5 (40.1)	−2.2 (28.0)	8.5 (47.3)
Daily mean °C (°F)	−7.5 (18.5)	−6.9 (19.6)	−3.5 (25.7)	2.8 (37.0)	9.1 (48.4)	13.6 (56.5)	17.7 (63.9)	18.4 (65.1)	14.1 (57.4)	7.7 (45.9)	1.2 (34.2)	−4.9 (23.2)	5.2 (41.4)
Mean daily minimum °C (°F)	−10.0 (14.0)	−9.8 (14.4)	−6.8 (19.8)	−0.8 (30.6)	5.1 (41.2)	9.6 (49.3)	14.6 (58.3)	15.3 (59.5)	10.7 (51.3)	4.2 (39.6)	−2.0 (28.4)	−7.6 (18.3)	1.9 (35.4)
Record low °C (°F)	−17.8 (0.0)	−17.3 (0.9)	−14.9 (5.2)	−10.9 (12.4)	−4.4 (24.1)	0.5 (32.9)	5.0 (41.0)	7.6 (45.7)	0.0 (32.0)	−4.8 (23.4)	−13.8 (7.2)	−18.0 (−0.4)	−18.0 (−0.4)
Average precipitation mm (inches)	117.7 (4.63)	80.1 (3.15)	82.4 (3.24)	106.0 (4.17)	117.0 (4.61)	136.1 (5.36)	178.1 (7.01)	211.0 (8.31)	223.0 (8.78)	218.0 (8.58)	195.6 (7.70)	167.7 (6.60)	1,832.7 (72.14)
Average snowfall cm (inches)	454 (179)	341 (134)	234 (92)	97 (38)	40 (16)	2 (0.8)	0 (0)	0 (0)	0 (0)	11 (4.3)	143 (56)	376 (148)	1,706 (672)
Average precipitation days (≥ 1.0 mm)	20.9	17.3	16.6	13.2	12.0	11.4	12.6	13.1	13.8	15.9	19.0	22.0	190.2
Average snowy days (≥ 3 cm)	24.8	21.0	18.6	11.1	6.3	0.4	0.0	0.0	0.0	1.2	10.5	22.8	116.1
Mean monthly sunshine hours	11.8	22.5	53.5	112.9	176.4	158.4	117.8	128.4	115.0	104.3	52.9	16.8	1,069.4
Source: JMA
