= Ichirō Kojima =

Japanese photographer

Ichirō Kojima (小島 一郎, Kojima Ichirō; 1924–1964) was a renowned Japanese photographer.
