= Aomori City Baseball Stadium =

Stadium in Aomori, Japan

Coordinates: 40°49′43″N 140°46′40″E

- Gappo Park Stadium
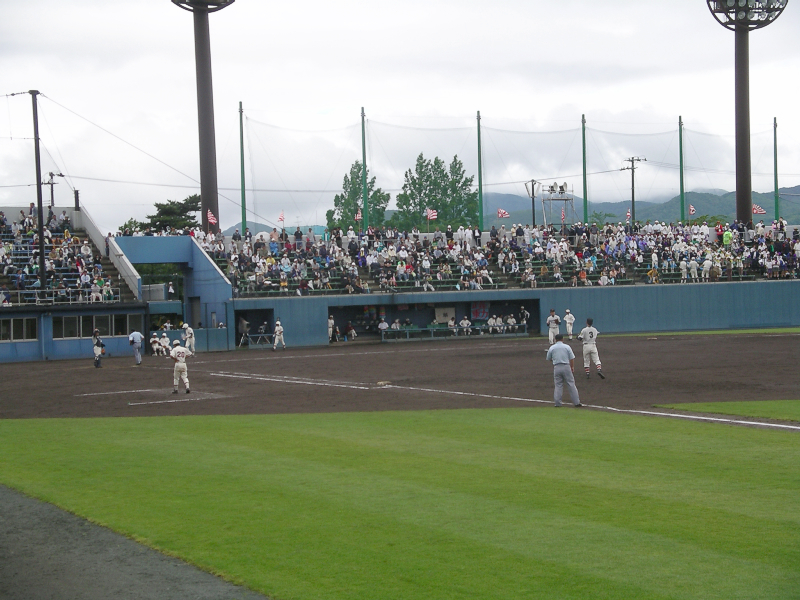
- Interactive map of Aomori City Baseball Stadium
- Location: Aomori, Japan
- Owner: Aomori city
- Capacity: 10,010
- Field size: left - 121 m center - 121 m right - 100 m

Construction
- Opened: 1950

Aomori City Baseball Stadium (青森市営野球場, Aomori shiei yakkyūjō) is a stadium in Aomori, Aomori Prefecture, Japan.

The stadium holds 10,010 people. The stadium was built in 1950 and was repaired in 2000.

On June 28, 1950, Hideo Fujimoto pitched a perfect game at the stadium. The stadium is not regularly used for Nippon Professional Baseball, but for high school baseball.
