= Shinmachi Street =

Shopping street in Aomori, Japan

Shinmachi Street (新町通り, Shinmachi-dōri) is the main shōtengai, or shopping street in central Aomori, Japan. Along the street are local department stores Lovina (adjacent to Aomori Station), Nakasan, and Sakurano as well as many smaller shops and restaurants. The street is one of many streets used in central Aomori during the Aomori Nebuta Matsuri.

== Route description ==
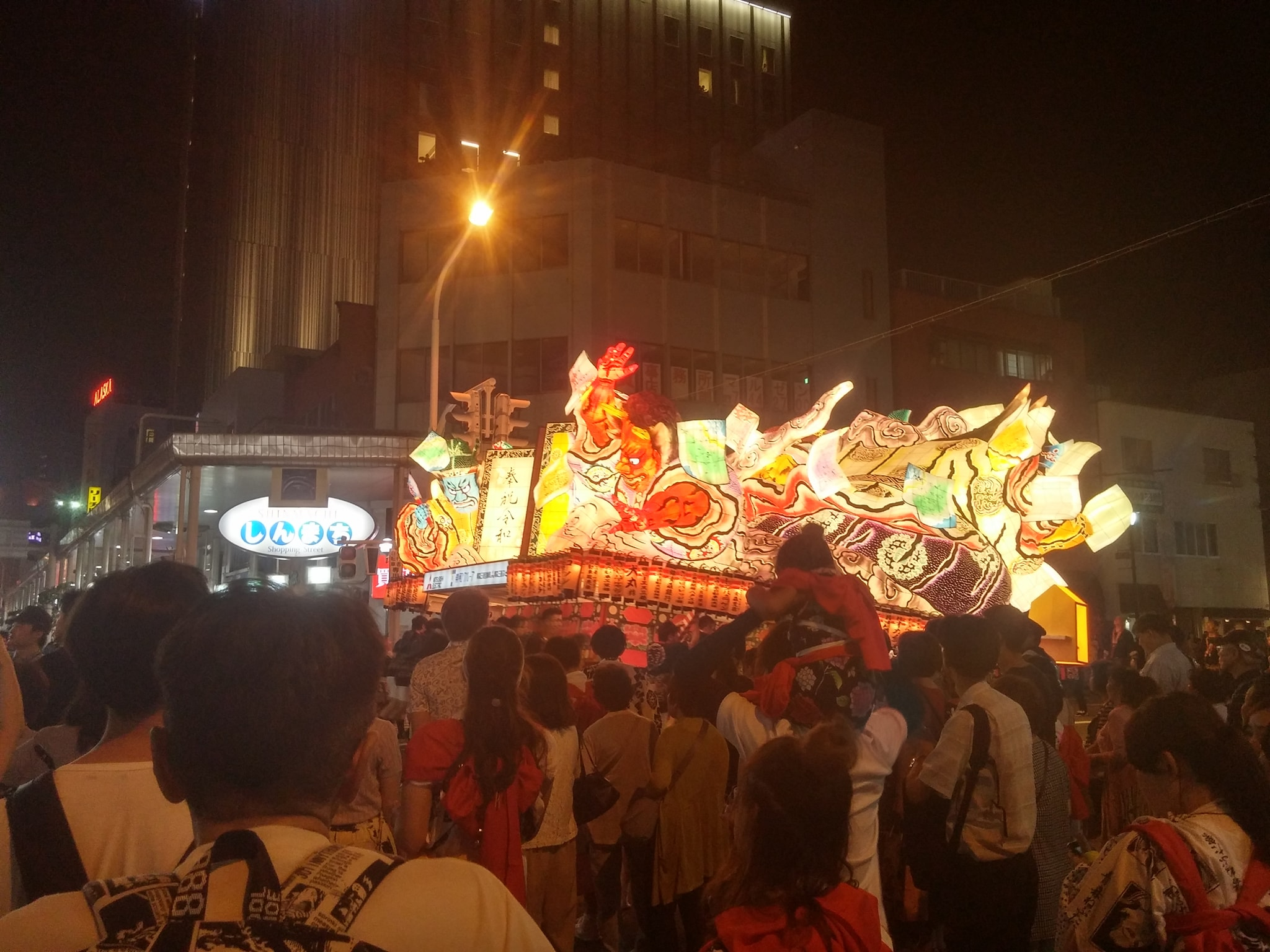
The Aomori Nebuta Matsuri on Shinmachi Street

Shinmachi Street runs west–east from the eastern side of Aomori Station 1.0 kilometre (0.62 mi) to Yanagimachi-dōri. The street is designated as Aomori Prefecture Route 16 along with the part of Yanagimachi-dōri between it and Japan National Route 4.

Since Aomori often receives heavy amounts of snow, the shopping street is equipped with a de-icing system that pumps seawater from Aomori Bay and sprays it on the street.
