= Komakino Site =

Archaeological site in Aomori, Japan

- 小牧野遺跡 (Japanese)
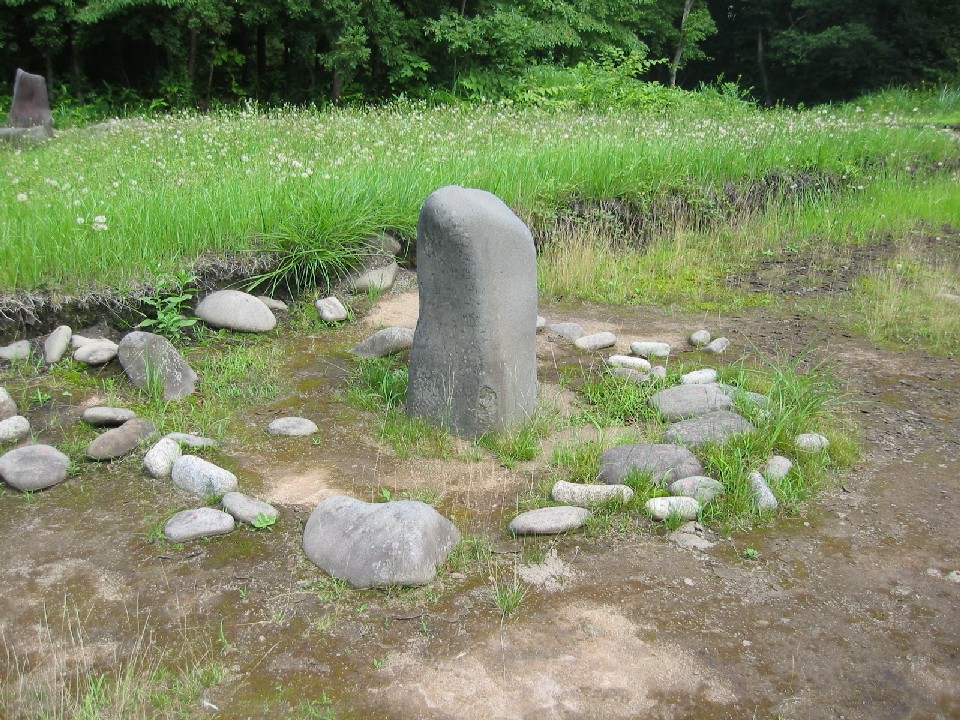
- Stone Circle at Komakino site

- Komakino Stone Circles Komakino Site (Japan)
- 40°44′15.0″N 140°43′41.4″E
- Type: stone circle
- Periods: Jōmon period
- Location: Aomori, Japan
- Region: Tōhoku region

History
- Built: 2000 BCE

Site notes
- Area: 87,632.61 square metres (21.65449 acres)
- Public access: Yes
- Website: komakinosite.jp/index.php/intro/about-komakino.html

The Komakino Site (小牧野遺跡, Komakino iseki) is an archaeological site located in the city of Aomori, Aomori Prefecture, in the Tōhoku region of northern Japan containing the ruins of a late Jōmon period (approx. 2000–1500 BC) settlement. The remains were designated a National Historic Site in 1995 by the Japanese government. The site is located a short distance (approximately 20 minutes by car) to the south of the famous Sannai-Maruyama Site.

== Overview ==
The site consists of large concentric stone circles located on an artificially flattened plateau at an altitude of 80 to 160 meters overlooking the Aomori Plain, between the Arakawa River and the Nyunai River in the western foothills of the Hakkōda Mountains to the southeast of the city center of Aomori. The stone circle has a diameter of 55 meters, with a 2.5 meter central ring surrounded by a 29-meter diameter middle ring and a 35 meters diameter outer ring. Portions of a fourth ring have also been found, along with a number of smaller stone circles with diameters of up to four meters around this outermost ring. The outer two rings of the stone circle were made by placing oval stones vertically and horizontally as if building a stone wall. This method of arranging stones is very rare, and the site is thus designated a type site for the "Komakino style" of stone arrangement.

The size of the site, and the fact that it was built on a slope which needed to be partially leveled, indicates that it required a great amount of labor to construct, and that its construction took a long period of time. In addition to the stone circles, the site includes pit dwellings, and middens. More than 100 earth pit tombs (both burrows and burial tombs) containing pottery coffins and grave goods with strong religious connections, such as miniature pottery and clay animal and human-shaped figures have been found on the gentle slope on the east side adjacent to the ring-shaped stones. Of note were more than 400 triangular-shaped stones, which were presumably used for some ritual purposes. In addition, many pottery shards excavated at this archeological site have been influenced by the Jōmon culture of Hokkaido.

The site has been submitted for inscription on the UNESCO World Heritage List as one of the Jōmon Archaeological Sites in Hokkaidō, Northern Tōhoku, and other regions

The site is approximately 30 minutes by car from either Aomori Station or Shin-Aomori Station.

== See also ==
- List of Historic Sites of Japan (Aomori)
