= Aomori Prefecture Tourist Center =

Skyscraper in Aomori, Aomori Prefecture, Japan

Aomori Prefecture Tourist Center (ASPM)
- 青森県観光物産館アスパム
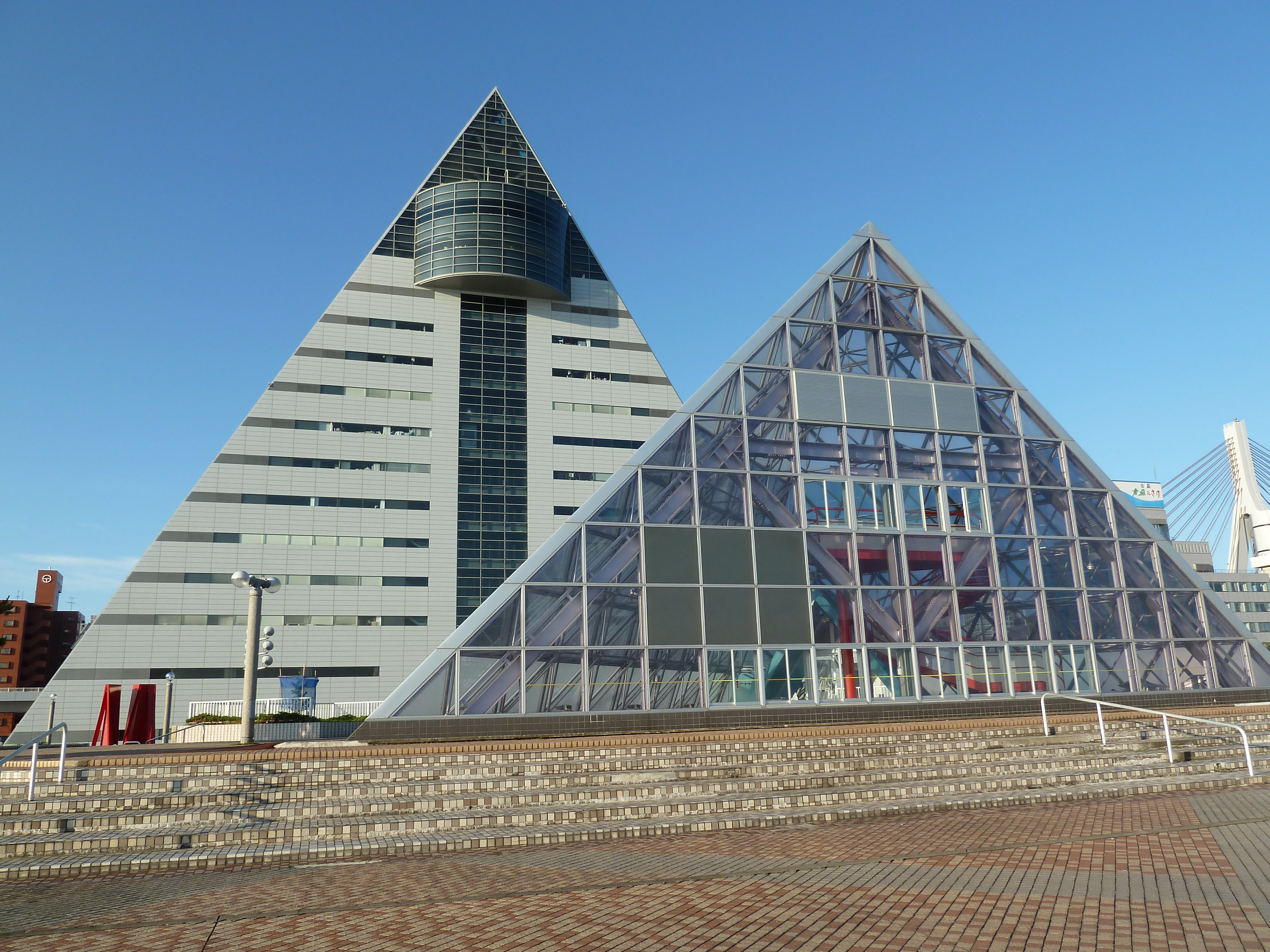

- Location within Japan

General information
- Location: 1-1-4 Yasukata, Aomori, Japan
- Coordinates: 40°49′47.3″N 140°44′28.7″E
- Groundbreaking: July 1984
- Completed: March 1986
- Opened: April 24, 1986

Height
- Height: 76 m (249 ft)

Technical details
- Floor count: 15 + 3 rooftop
- Floor area: 14,303 m^{2} (153,960 sq ft)
- Grounds: 14,996 m^{2} (161,420 sq ft)

Design and construction
- Architecture firm: Nikken Sekkei
- Main contractor: Shimizu Corporation + Nishimatsu Construction

The Aomori Prefecture Tourist Center (ASPM) (青森県観光物産館アスパム, Aomori-ken Kankō Bussankan (Asupamu)) is a skyscraper located in Aomori, Aomori Prefecture, Japan. Construction of the 76-meter, 15-story skyscraper was finished in 1986.
