= Masamichi Katayama =

Japanese interior designer (born 1966)

- Born: 24 August 1966 (age 58); Seto, Okayama, Japan
- Education: Osaka Designer College
- Occupations: Interior designer; Professor at Musashino Art University

Masamichi Katayama (片山 正通, Katayama Masamichi, born August 24, 1966) is a Japanese interior designer. Principal of Wonderwall Inc., and professor at Musashino Art University.

The Emporium (completed in 2014) was selected as "9 of the World's Most Beautifully Designed Malls" in Architectural Digest. Katayama received Frame Awards 2020 Lifetime Achievement Award.
