= Imabetsu =

Imabetsu 今別町
- Town
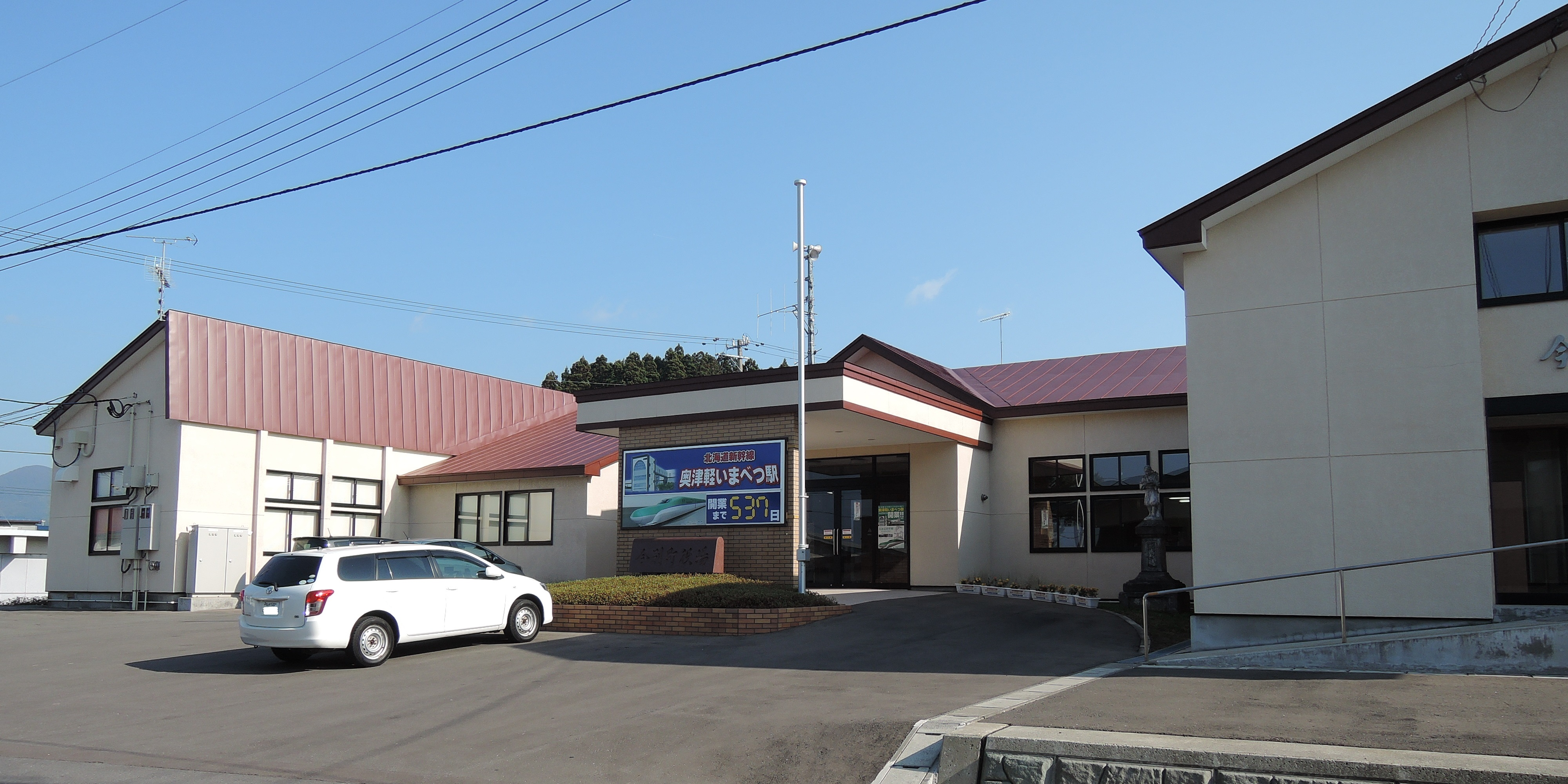
- Imabetsu Town Hall

- Flag Seal
- Interactive map of Imabetsu
- Coordinates: 41°10′54.4″N 140°28′54″E
- Country: Japan
- Region: Tōhoku
- Prefecture: Aomori
- District: Higashitsugaru

Area
  - Total: 125.27 km^{2} (48.37 sq mi)

Population (December 31, 2022)
  - Total: 2,311
  - Density: 18.45/km^{2} (47.78/sq mi)
- Time zone: UTC+9 (Japan Standard Time)
- Phone number: 0174-35-2001
- Address: 167 Imabetsu, Imabetsu-machi, Higashitsugaru-gun, Aomori-ken 030-1502
- Climate: Cfa
- Website: Official website
- Symbols
- Bird: Common gull
- Flower: Chrysanthemum
- Tree: Hiba

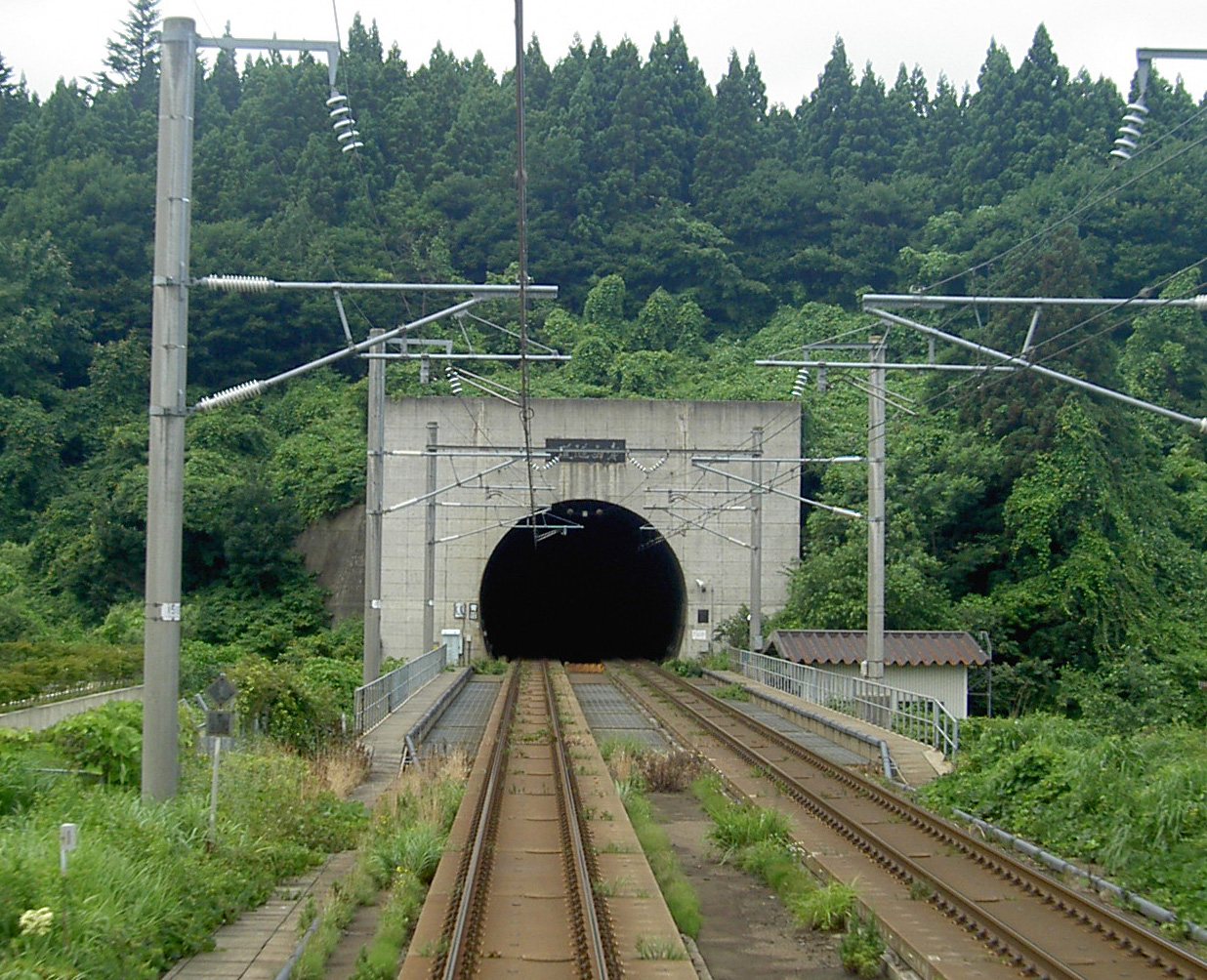
Seikan Tunnel entrance

Imabetsu (今別町, Imabetsu-machi) is a town located in Aomori Prefecture, Japan and a part of the Aomori metropolitan area. As of 31 August 2026, the town had an estimated population of 1974 in 1235 households, and a population density of 18 persons per km^{2}. The total area of the town is 125.27 km^{2} (48.37 sq mi).

== Geography ==
Imabetsu is in Higashitsugaru District of Aomori Prefecture, and occupies the northern coastline of Tsugaru Peninsula, facing Tsugaru Strait. It is surrounded by Mount Yotsutaki and Mount Maruyagata to the east and west, and faces Mimaya Bay to the north. The area of the town is the basin of the Imabetsu River, which mainly flows into Mimaya Bay, and the basins of the Nagakawa and Kurosaki Rivers. Much of the town is within the limits of the Tsugaru Quasi-National Park.

=== Neighbouring municipalities ===
Aomori Prefecture

- Goshogawara
- Sotogahama

=== Climate ===
The town has a cold humid continental climate (Köppen Cfb) characterized by warm short summers and long cold winters with heavy snowfall. The average annual temperature in Imabetsu is 10.2 °C. The average annual rainfall is 1249 mm with September as the wettest month. The temperatures are highest on average in August, at around 22.9 °C, and lowest in January, at around -1.4 °C.

Climate data for Imabetsu (1991−2020 normals, extremes 1976−present)
Month	Jan	Feb	Mar	Apr	May	Jun	Jul	Aug	Sep	Oct	Nov	Dec	Year
Record high °C (°F)	11.3 (52.3)	15.8 (60.4)	18.3 (64.9)	25.7 (78.3)	29.7 (85.5)	30.8 (87.4)	32.9 (91.2)	33.7 (92.7)	33.3 (91.9)	26.4 (79.5)	22.3 (72.1)	15.8 (60.4)	33.7 (92.7)
Mean daily maximum °C (°F)	1.6 (34.9)	2.3 (36.1)	6.1 (43.0)	12.2 (54.0)	16.9 (62.4)	20.2 (68.4)	24.0 (75.2)	25.9 (78.6)	23.2 (73.8)	17.3 (63.1)	10.5 (50.9)	4.2 (39.6)	13.7 (56.7)
Daily mean °C (°F)	−0.8 (30.6)	−0.4 (31.3)	2.5 (36.5)	7.7 (45.9)	12.4 (54.3)	16.0 (60.8)	20.3 (68.5)	22.1 (71.8)	18.9 (66.0)	13.0 (55.4)	7.0 (44.6)	1.4 (34.5)	10.0 (50.0)
Mean daily minimum °C (°F)	−3.3 (26.1)	−3.2 (26.2)	−0.9 (30.4)	3.3 (37.9)	8.1 (46.6)	12.4 (54.3)	17.3 (63.1)	19.0 (66.2)	15.1 (59.2)	8.8 (47.8)	3.5 (38.3)	−1.3 (29.7)	6.6 (43.8)
Record low °C (°F)	−10.7 (12.7)	−11.2 (11.8)	−9.0 (15.8)	−4.4 (24.1)	−0.5 (31.1)	3.9 (39.0)	9.4 (48.9)	11.0 (51.8)	5.8 (42.4)	1.1 (34.0)	−6.1 (21.0)	−10.4 (13.3)	−11.2 (11.8)
Average precipitation mm (inches)	137.0 (5.39)	103.1 (4.06)	98.1 (3.86)	98.5 (3.88)	105.6 (4.16)	86.6 (3.41)	129.4 (5.09)	191.9 (7.56)	167.2 (6.58)	159.0 (6.26)	176.4 (6.94)	167.0 (6.57)	1,619.8 (63.77)
Average snowfall cm (inches)	163 (64)	131 (52)	87 (34)	5 (2.0)	0 (0)	0 (0)	0 (0)	0 (0)	0 (0)	0 (0)	14 (5.5)	103 (41)	503 (198)
Average precipitation days (≥ 1.0 mm)	22.7	18.1	15.6	11.9	10.8	9.1	10.2	10.6	12.1	14.2	18.3	22.6	176.2
Average snowy days (≥ 3 cm)	19.4	16.9	11.7	0.6	0	0	0	0	0	0	1.6	13.2	63.4
Mean monthly sunshine hours	27.6	55.5	126.1	187.2	198.5	177.6	157.6	186.4	170.3	144.9	68.6	33.9	1,527.1
Source: Japan Meteorological Agency

== Demographics ==
Per Japanese census data, the population of Imabetsu has decreased by more than two-thirds over the past 60 years and is now much less than it was a century ago.

Historical population
Year	Pop.	±%
1920	5,188	—
1930	5,385	+3.8%
1940	6,121	+13.7%
1950	7,710	+26.0%
1960	8,068	+4.6%
1970	7,358	−8.8%
1980	7,113	−3.3%
1990	4,978	−30.0%
2000	4,124	−17.2%
2010	3,217	−22.0%
2020	2,334	−27.4%

== History ==
The area around Imabetsu was controlled by the Tsugaru clan of Hirosaki Domain during the Edo period. After the Meiji Restoration Minmaya, Kanita and Tairadate villages were separated from Imabetsu, which was also organized as a village on April 1, 1889, with the establishment of the modern municipalities system. On March 31, 1955, Imabetsu annexed the neighboring village of Ippongi and was elevated to town status.

== Government ==
Imabetsu has a mayor-council form of government with a directly elected mayor and a unicameral town legislature of six members. Higashitsugaru District, contributes one member to the Aomori Prefectural Assembly. In terms of national politics, the town is part of Aomori 1st district of the lower house of the Diet of Japan.

== Economy ==
The economy of Imabetsu is heavily dependent on commercial fishing and agriculture. Some of the locally caught seafood include sea urchin roe, sea cucumber, scallops, abalone and squid. Imabetsu is known for Imabetsu-gyu, a type of wagyu, and Shine Muscat grapes.

== Education ==
Imabetsu has one public elementary school and one public junior high middle school operated by the town government. The public high school operated by the Aomori Prefectural Board of Education closed in April 2022.

== Transportation ==
=== Railway ===
East Japan Railway Company (JR East) - Tsugaru Line

- Tsugaru-Futamata, Ōkawadai, Imabetsu, Tsugaru-Hamana

Hokkaidō Railway Company (JR Hokkaido) - Hokkaido Shinkansen

- Okutsugaru-Imabetsu

=== Highway ===
- National Route 280
