= Tappizaki Lighthouse =

Tappisaki Lighthouse 龍飛埼灯台
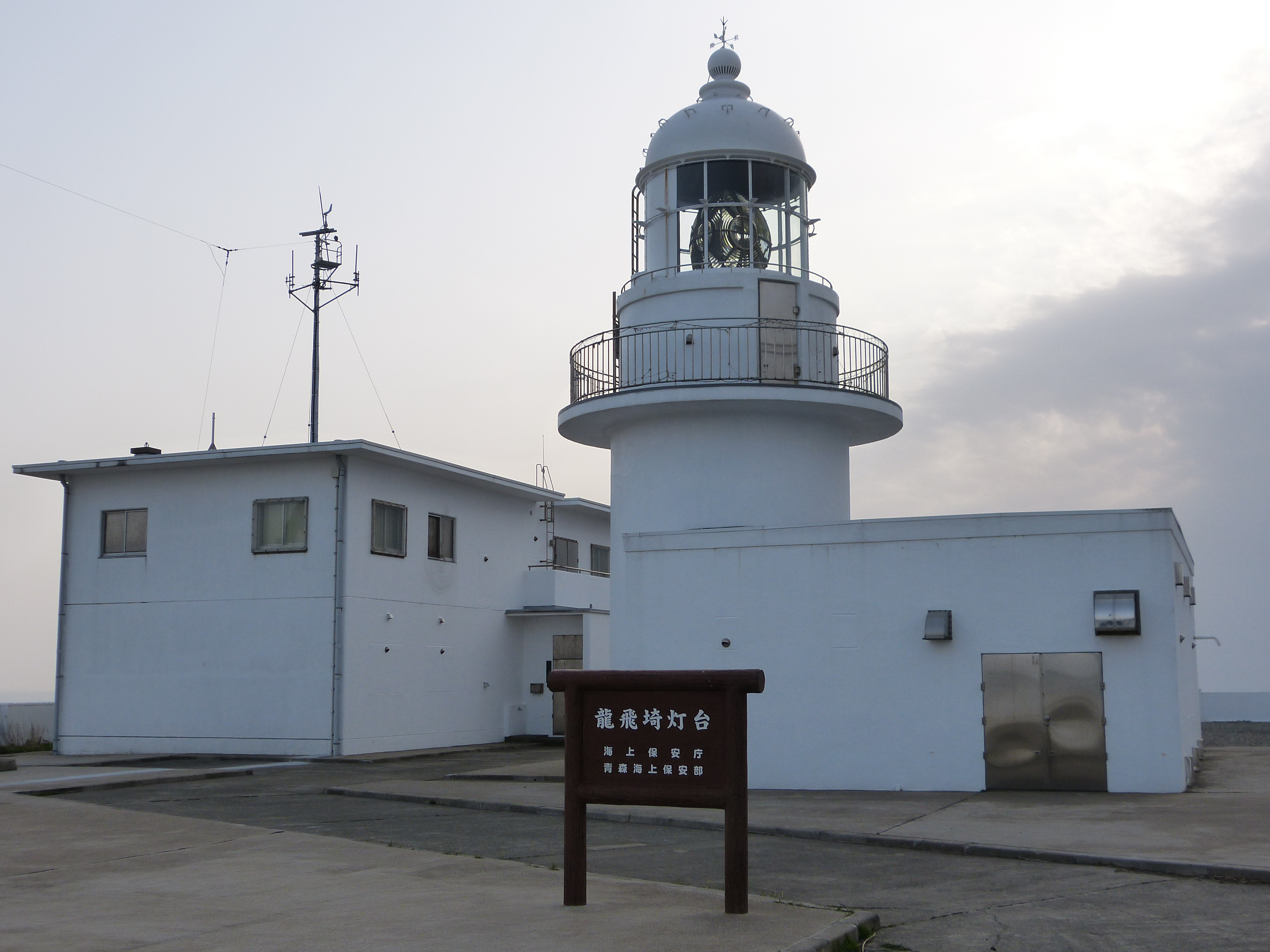
- Location: Cape Tappi, Sotogahama, Aomori Prefecture, Japan
- Coordinates: 41°15′30″N 140°20′33″E

Tower
- Constructed: 1932
- Construction: brick, concrete
- Automated: 2006
- Height: 13.72 m (45.0 ft)
- Shape: cylinder
- Markings: White (tower), white (lantern)

Light
- Focal height: 119 m (390 ft)
- Lens: second order Fresnel lens, third order Fresnel lens
- Intensity: 470,000 candela
- Range: 24 nmi (44 km; 28 mi)
- Characteristic: Fl W 20s
- Japan no.: JCG-1501

Tappizaki Lighthouse (龍飛埼灯台, Tappizaki tōdai) is a lighthouse located on the outermost extremity of Cape Tappi, the northernmost point of Tsugaru Peninsula, Honshu, in Sotogahama, Aomori Prefecture, Japan. It is located within the Tsugaru Quasi-National Park and on clear days, Hokkaido can be seen across the Tsugaru Strait.

== History ==
Construction of Tappizaki Lighthouse was completed on July 1, 1932. A radio beacon was installed in March 1933. The light came under the control of the Japan Coast Guard beginning in 1965. In 1998, the lamp was upgraded to a metal halide lamp. It was opened to the public on October 31, 2005. Since April 1, 2006, control of the light has been completely automated and it is currently unattended. It is listed as one of the “50 Lighthouses of Japan” by the Japan Lighthouse Association.

== See also ==
- List of lighthouses in Japan
