= Japan National Route 280 =

National highway of Japan

National Route 280
- 国道280号
- Japan National Route 280 highlighted in red
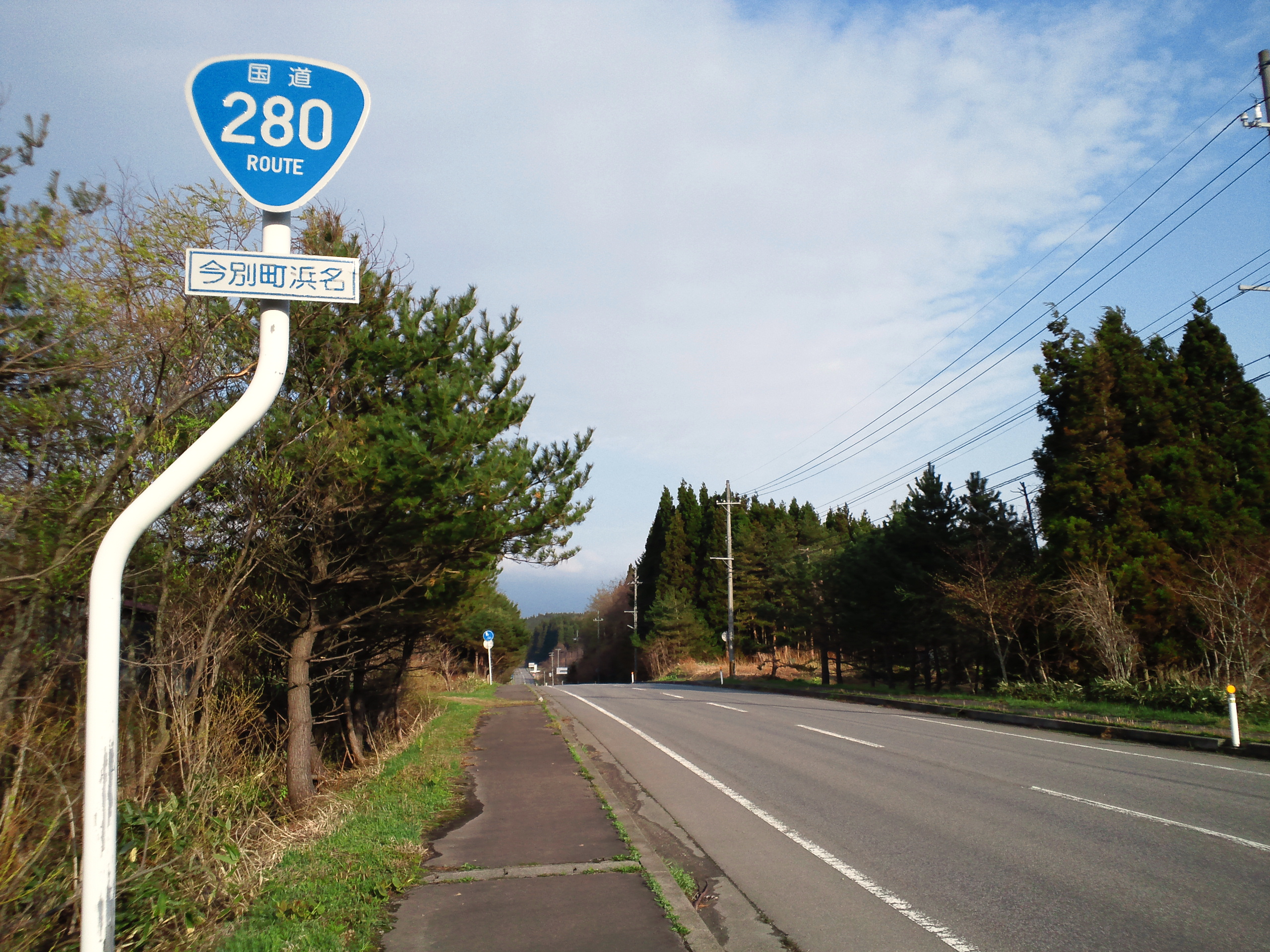

Route information
- Length: 171.7 km (106.7 mi) Distance does not include the defunct Minmaya-Fukushima ferry route, but does include bypasses signed with the same route number
- Existed: 1 April 1970–present

Major junctions
- North end: National Route 5 in Hakodate, Hokkaido
- National Route 228; Minmaya-Fukushima Ferry across Tsugaru Strait (defunct); National Route 339
- South end: National Route 7 in Aomori, Aomori

Location
- Country: Japan

Highway system
- National highways of Japan; Expressways of Japan
← National Route 279	→ National Route 281

National Route 280 (国道280号, Kokudō Nihyaku hachi-jugō) is a national highway of Japan that traverses the prefectures, Aomori and Hokkaido as well as the Tsugaru Strait that separates them. It currently is made up of two sections that travel 150.7 kilometres (93.6 mi) from Aomori, north across the Tsugaru Peninsula to Sotogahama where the first section ends at the site of a former ferry to across the Tsugaru Strait to the town, Fukushima. The other section begins at the corresponding former ferry terminal in Fukushima. The road then travels alongside the southern coast of Hokkaido concurrently with National Route 228 to Hakodate where the route meets its northern terminus.

National Route 280's path across Aomori and Hokkaido follows one of the oldest roads in northern Japan, the Matsumaedō. It was established by Tokugawa Ieyasu for government officials traveling through the area as a branch of the Edo Five Routes and it had some defensive importance to the Japanese who feared a Russian incursion into Ezo, which was ruled by the Matsumae clan.

== Route description ==
=== Aomori Prefecture ===
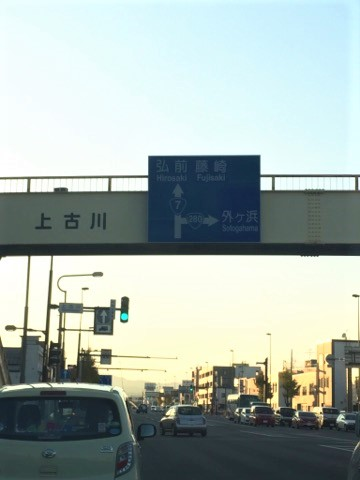
The southern terminus of Japan National Route 280 in Aomori

The southern terminus of National Route 280 lies at an intersection with National Route 7 just over 500 metres (1,600 ft) southwest of Aomori Station to the west of the central district of Aomori. From there, the route generally travels northwest through the city streets as it makes its way out of the city. Near Aburakawa Station, the route begins closely paralleling the coast of Aomori Bay, it continues paralleling the coast throughout its path on the Tsugaru Peninsula. In Minmaya at the northern end of the peninsula, the roadway designation switches to National Route 339. At this point a ferry once carried the route across the Tsugaru Strait, but it has ceased operation.

=== Hokkaido ===
National Route 280's path through Hokkaido begins at the port where the ferry from Minmaya used to travel to in Fukushima. The road briefly travels southwest to National Route 228. From that junction, National Route 280 runs concurrently with National Route 228 the rest of the way to its northern terminus in Hakodate. The routes run parallel to the southern coast of Hokkaido along the Tsugaru Strait on their way to Hakodate. The northern terminus of National Route 280 lies about 1.7 kilometres (1.1 mi) north of Hakodate Station at a junction with National Route 5.

== History ==
What is known today as National Route 280 was originally established during the Edo period by Tokugawa Ieyasu as the Matsumaedō. Its primary purpose was for government officials traveling through the area as a branch of the Ōshū Kaidō, one of the Edo Five Routes connecting the capital to the rest of Japan. It also had defensive importance to the Japanese who feared a Russian incursion into Ezo, which was ruled by the Matsumae clan; however, the main threat to Japanese control of the area was rebellion by the native Ainu.

National Route 280 was established by the Cabinet of Japan along the Edo period road and the ferry linking Sotogahama and Fukushima in 1970. The ferry service along National Route 280 was discontinued in 1998, leaving the non-contiguous sections of the route without a direct road link.

== List of major junctions ==
All junctions listed are at-grade intersections unless noted otherwise.

Prefecture	Location	km	mi	Destinations	Notes
Aomori	Aomori	0.0	0.0	National Route 7 (Aomori West Bypass) / National Route 101 – Towada, Central Aomori, Shin-Aomori Station, Aomori-chūō	Southern terminus
Aomori	Aomori	4.4	2.7	Aomori Prefecture Route 234 south – Shinjo, National Route 7	
Aomori	Aomori	4.8	3.0	Aomori Prefecture Route 26 west – Goshogawara	
Aomori	Aomori	10.5	6.5	Aomori Prefecture Route 2 west – Tsugaru, Goshogawara	
Aomori	Sotogahama	26.7	16.6	Aomori Prefecture Route 12 (Yamanami Line) west – Tappi, Nakadomari	
Aomori	Imabetsu	60.6	37.7	Aomori Prefecture Route 14 – Aomori, Sotogahama, Imabetsu town office	
Aomori	Sotogahama	64.8	40.3	Aomori Prefecture Route 230 – Minmaya Station	
Aomori	Sotogahama	66.3	41.2	National Route 339 south / Aomori Prefecture Route 230	Northern terminus of Aomori Prefecture segment; roadway continues as National Route 339
Tsugaru Strait		66.3 83.3	41.2 51.8	Sanpuku Ferry (defunct)	
Hokkaido	Fukushima	83.3	51.8		Southern terminus of Hokkaido segment
Hokkaido	Fukushima	83.7	52.0	National Route 228	Southern terminus of National Route 228 concurrency
Hokkaido	Fukushima	84.6	52.6	Hokkaido Route 532 east – Iwabe	Southern terminus of Hokkaido Route 532 concurrency
Hokkaido	Fukushima	85.1	52.9	Hokkaido Route 532 west	Northern terminus of Hokkaido Route 532 concurrency
Hokkaido	Fukushima	98.0	60.9	Hokkaido Route 812 north	
Hokkaido	Shiriuchi	100.8	62.6	Hokkaido Route 698 east	
Hokkaido	Shiriuchi	110.2	68.5	Hokkaido Route 531 south – Kotaniishi	
Hokkaido	Shiriuchi	110.8	68.8	Hokkaido Route 698 west	
Hokkaido	Kikonai	117.3	72.9	Hokkaido Route 383 north – Esashi, Central Kikonai	
Hokkaido	Kikonai	119.7	74.4	Hokkaido Route 5 west – Esashi, Kikonai Station	
Hokkaido	Hokuto	138.8	86.2	Hokkaido Route 29 west – Central Moheji, Hakodate-Esashi Expressway (northbound)	
Hokkaido	Hokuto	143.0	88.9	Hakodate-Esashi Expressway	E59 exit 4 (Hokuto-Tomigawa Interchange); entrance to northbound E59, exit from southbound E59
Hokkaido	Hokuto	150.7	93.6	National Route 227 west – Sapporo, Esashi, Hakodate-Esashi Expressway	Southern terminus of National Route 227 concurrency
Hokkaido	Hakodate	153.2	95.2	Hokkaido Route 347 east	
Hokkaido	Hakodate	150.7	93.6	National Route 5 / Hokkaido Route 571 east – Oshamambe, Mori, Mount Hakodate, Hakodate Station, Yunokawa, Goryōkaku Park	Northern terminus; eastern terminus of National Routes 227 and 228; roadway continues as Hokkaido Route 571
1.000 mi = 1.609 km; 1.000 km = 0.621 mi: Closed/former; Concurrency terminus; Incomplete access
