= Tairadate Battery =

- 平舘台場跡 (Japanese)
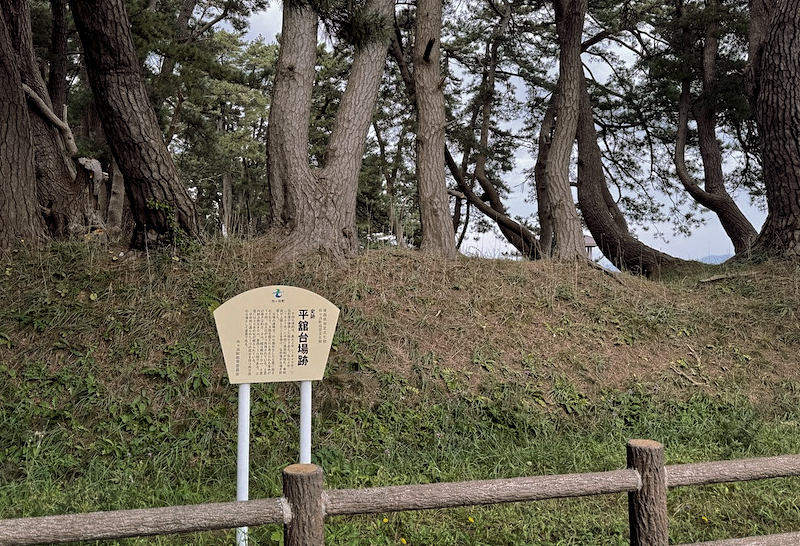
- Tairadate Battery ruins

- Location within Aomori Prefecture Location within Japan
- 41°10′28″N 140°38′34″E
- Type: fortification
- Location: Sotogahama, Aomori, Japan

History
- Built: 1849
- Demolished: 1871
- Aomori Prefecture Historic Site

The Tairadate Battery (平舘台場跡, Tairadate Daiba-ato) was a Bakumatsu period coastal artillery battery erected by Hirosaki Domain at the entrance to Mutsu Bay in the Tairadate neighborhood of the town of Sotogahama, Aomori in the far northern Tohoku region of northern Japan. The ruins were designated an Aomori Prefectural Historic Site in 2004.

== Overview ==
In the late Edo period, the Tokugawa shogunate was increasing alarmed by incursions by foreign ships into Japanese territorial waters, fearing that these kurofune warships of the United States or other Western powers would attempt to end Japan's self-imposed national isolation policy by force, or would attempt an invasion of Japan by landing hostile military forces. Numerous feudal domains were ordered to establish fortifications along their coastlines with shore artillery located at strategic locations. In the northern end of Honshu, violations of Japanese isolation began occurring with increasing frequency due to large numbers of foreign whaling ships in the Sea of Japan. In 1834, a whaling ship anchored at Kazuki hamlet in Imabetsu, and some American sailors came ashore. In 1847, another whaling vessel anchored at Tairadate, and eight Dutch sailors came ashore. The following year, another foreign vessel landed crewmen at Mimaya. Alarmed by these incursions, Hirosaki Domain rushed to construct a bow-shaped earthen rampart with a length of 80 meters north-south and 11 meters east-west and height of about 2.3 meters, in the form of a redan with an open back. There were openings in this fortification for the placement of seven cannons. To camouflage its location from offshore vessels, 33 pine trees were planted in front. A jin'ya (fortified residence) was constructed as a barracks for samurai manning the fortification. It was surrounded by 1.5-meter high earthern walls, and contained storehouses for supplies and gunpowder. It is estimated that 60 to 70 people worked there, with 20 to 25 people rotating shifts.

In 1853, Yoshida Shōin, a samurai of Chōshū Domain visited the Tairadate Battery with Miyabe Teizō and others on his tour of coastal defense facilities, and recorded the incident in his "Tōhoku Travel Diary". The Tairadate battery was never used in combat, and was dismantled in 1869, shortly after the Meiji restoration. At present, the site is a public park, with the designated area covering 11,941 square meters, including surrounding pine forests.

The site is located approximately 17 kilometers from JR East Tsugaru Line Kanita Station.

== See also ==
- List of Historic Sites of Japan (Aomori)
