= Aomori Bay West Coast Fault Zone =

- 青森湾西岸断層帯; Aomoriwan-seigan Dansō-tai
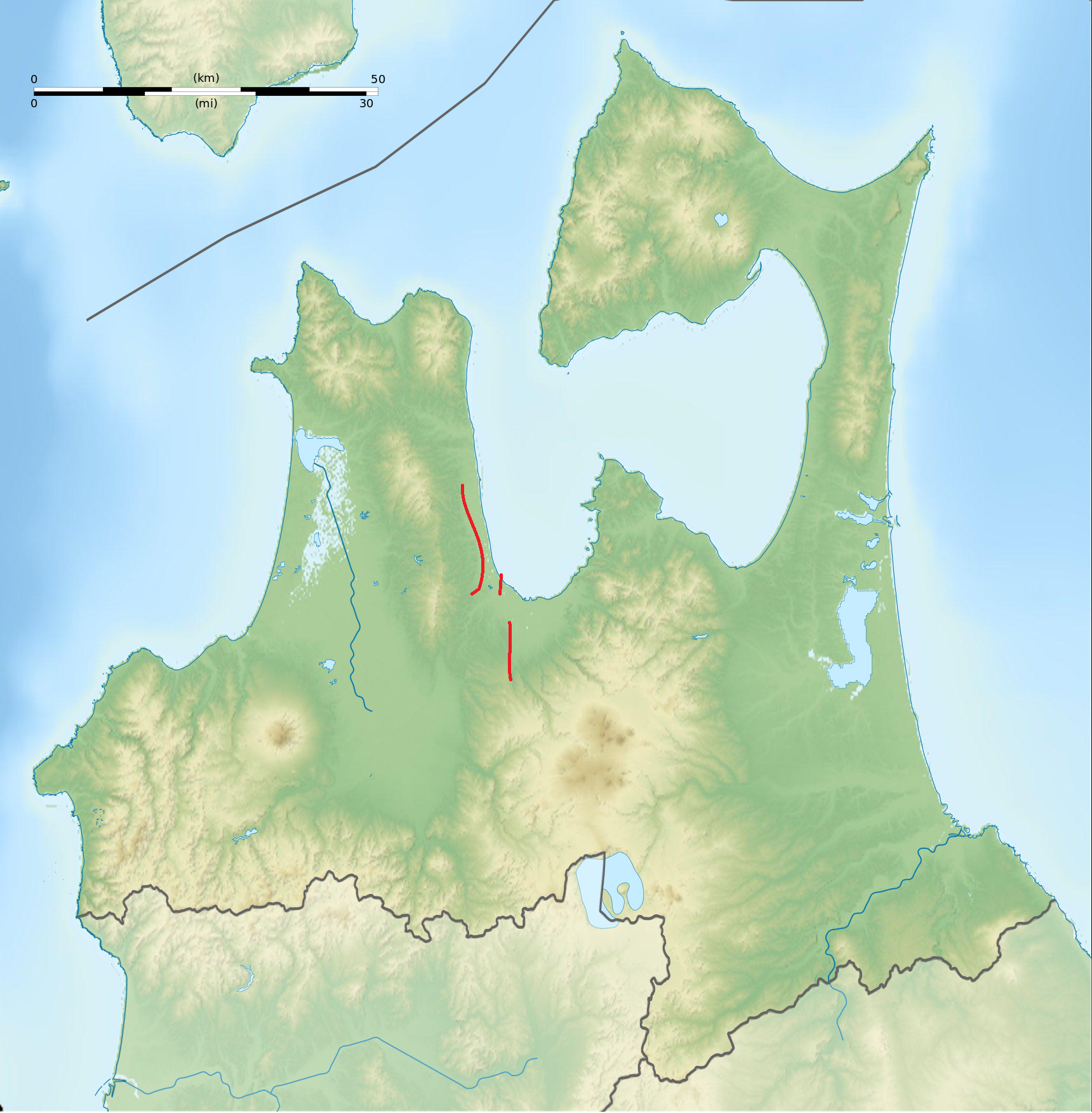
- Aomori Prefecture with the Aomori Bay West Coast Fault Zone shown in red

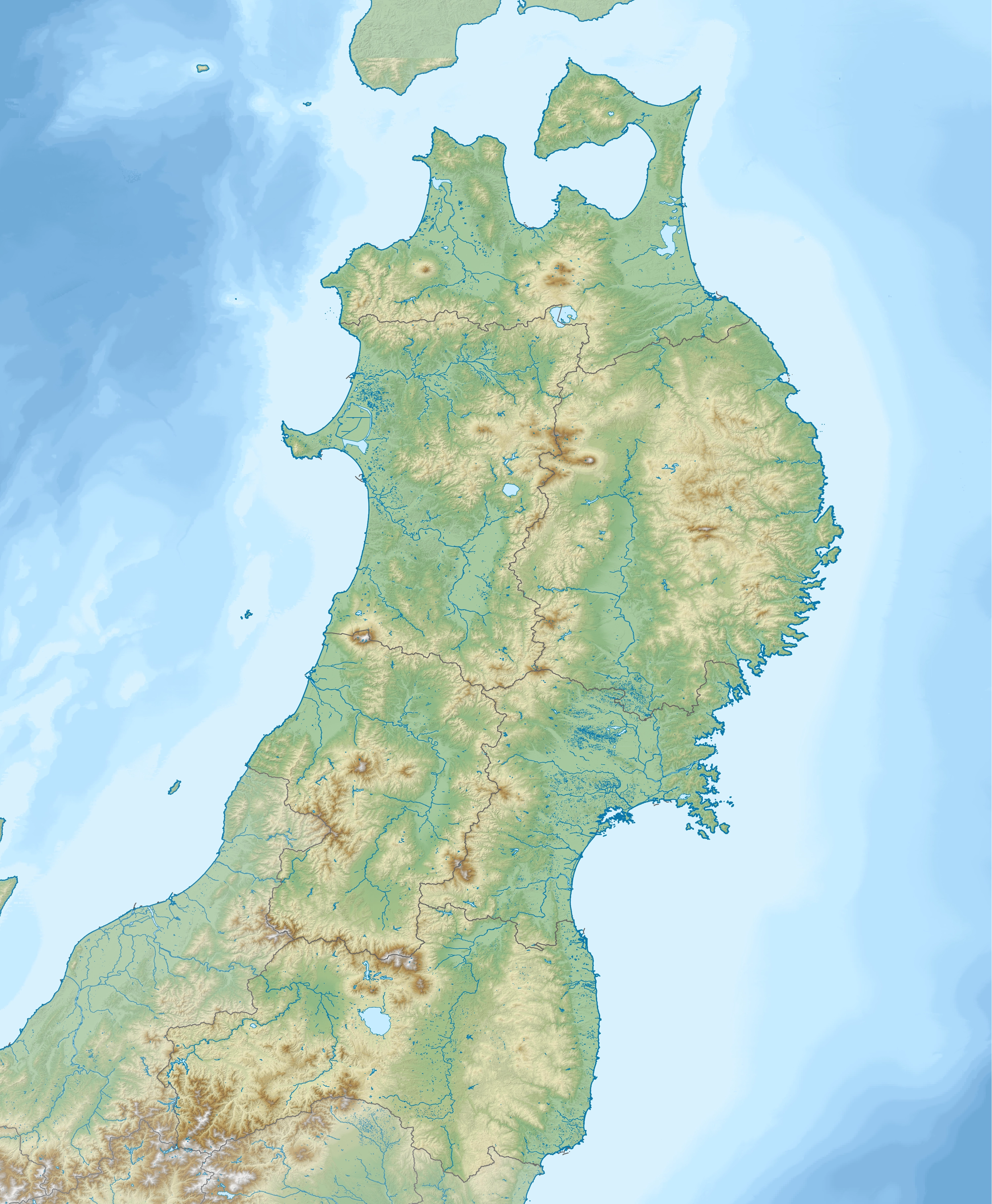
- Location in Tohoku
- Coordinates: 40°53′58.3″N 140°38′07.8″E
- Country: Japan
- Region: Tōhoku
- Cities: Aomori, Yomogita

Characteristics
- Segments: Aomori Bay West Fault, Nogiwa Fault, Nyunai Fault
- Length: 31 km (19 mi)
- Displacement: 0.4–0.8 m (1.3–2.6 ft)/1000 years

Tectonics
- Plate: Okhotsk (maybe North America)
- Status: Active
- Type: reverse fault
- Age: Miocene-recent
- Orogeny: North Kitakami Belt

The Aomori Bay West Coast Fault Zone (青森湾西岸断層帯, Aomoriwan-seigan Dansō-tai) is an active fault zone on the Tsugaru Peninsula in Aomori Prefecture and its capital city, Aomori. It is paralleled to east by the west coast of Aomori Bay and to the west by the Tsugaru Mountains, running from north-northwest to south-southeast on the peninsula, through the city of Aomori, and finally extending south toward the Hakkōda Mountains. The zone is made up of three faults: the Aomori Bay West Fault, the Nogiwa Fault, and the Nyunai Fault. The Nyunai fault is a reverse fault.

== Earthquakes ==
No major earthquakes can be directly attributed to the Aomori Bay West Coast Fault Zone during recorded history. There is a history of destructive earthquakes originating in the area, but they could have come from other faults on the peninsula.

It has been estimated that the fault zone could produce an earthquake with a magnitude of 7.3 M_{j}. There is a 5-10 percent chance of an earthquake occurring on the zone in the next 300 years.

== See also ==
- Tsugaru Peninsula – Peninsula of Honshu, Japan
- Aomori Bay – Bay in Japan
