= E59 =

E59 may refer to:

- European route E59
- Nimzo-Indian Defence, Encyclopaedia of Chess Openings code
- Hakodate-Esashi Expressway, route E59 in Japan
