= Tsugaru Mountains =

Mountain range in Aomori Prefecture, Japan

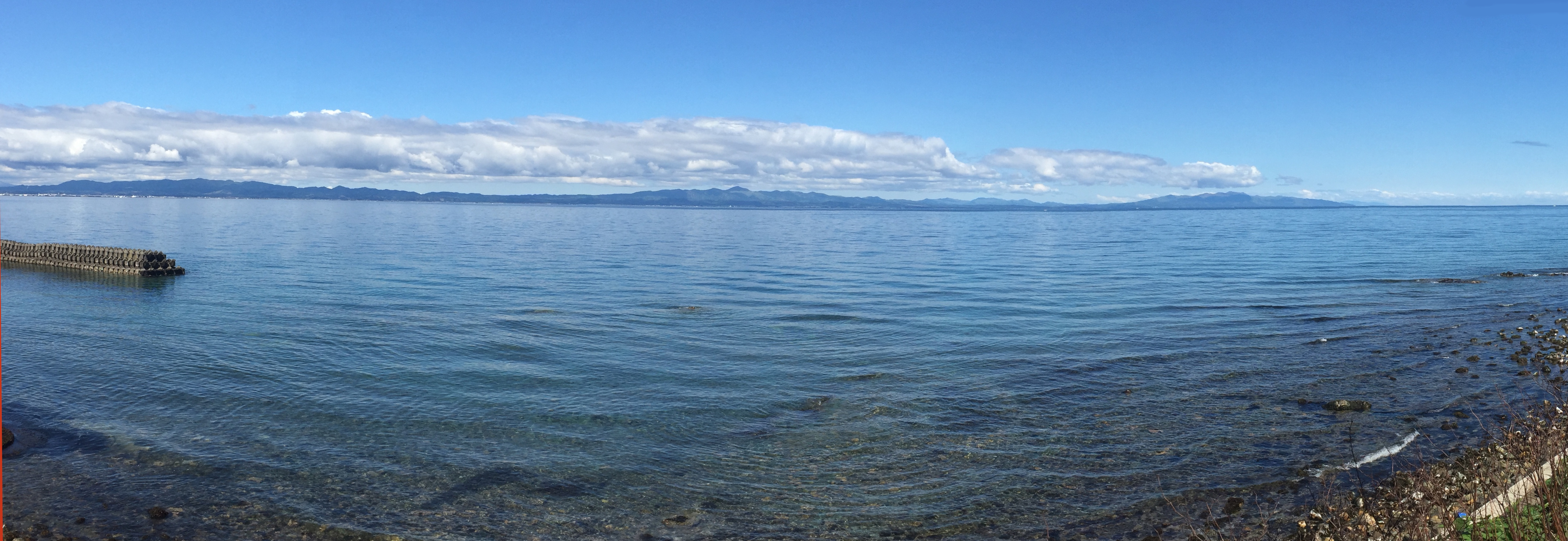
- The Tsugaru Mountains seen from the eastern shore of Aomori Bay.

Highest point
- Peak: Mount Maruyakata, Sotogahama
- Elevation: 718 m (2,356 ft)

Dimensions
- Length: 60 km (37 mi) North-South

Naming
- Native name: 津軽山地 (Japanese); Tsugaru-sanchi (Japanese)

Geography
- Country: Japan
- Prefecture: Aomori Prefecture
- Region: Tōhoku
- Range coordinates: 41°9′10″N 140°35′11″E

Geology
- Orogeny: Island arc

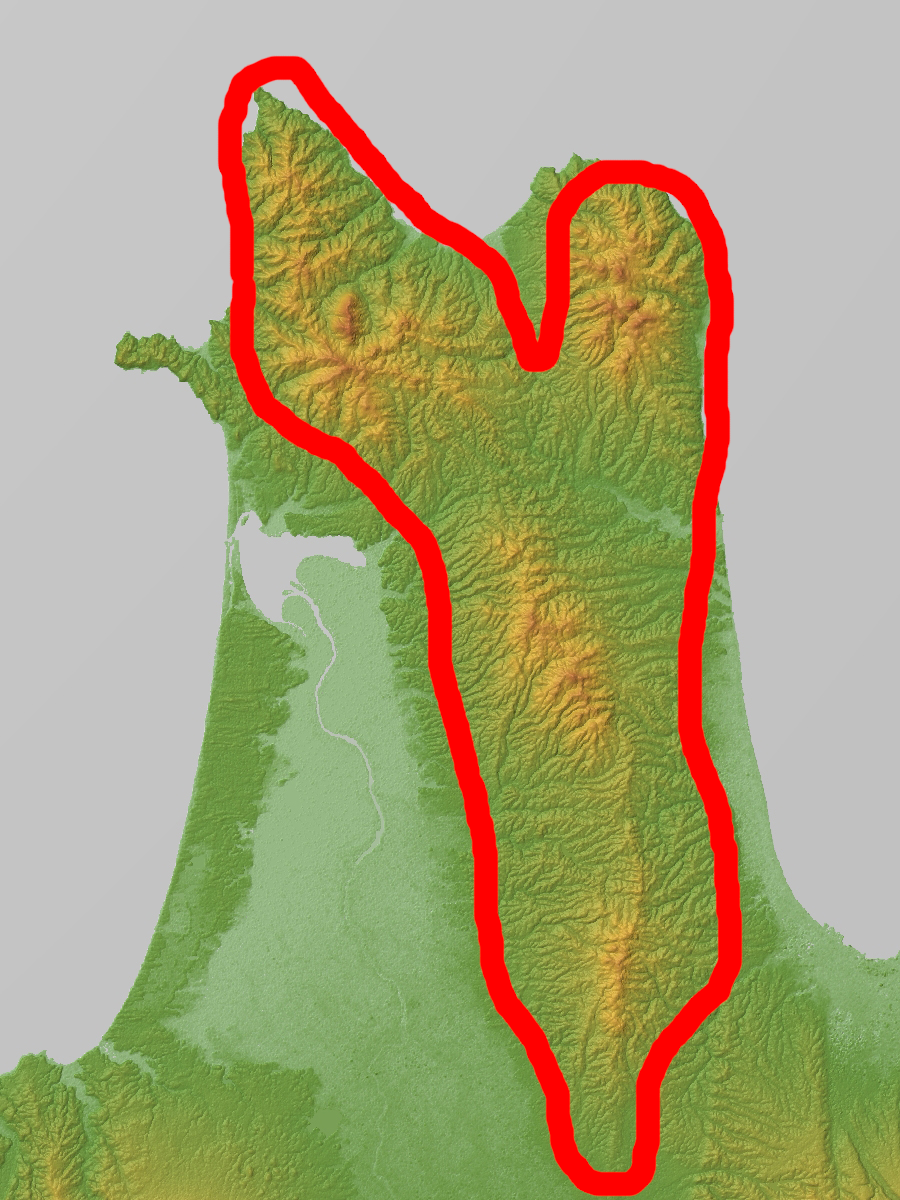
A map of the Tsugaru Peninsula with the Tsugaru Mountains outlined in red

The Tsugaru Mountains (津軽山地, Tsugaru-sanchi) are a mountain range on the Tsugaru Peninsula of Aomori Prefecture, in Honshū, Japan. The range stretches 60 km (37 mi) south-southeast from Cape Tappi on the northern end of the peninsula to the western flank of the volcanic Hakkōda Mountains south of the city of Aomori. The highest point in the range is Mount Maruyakata, measuring 718 meters (2,356 ft).

It is made up of mountains ranging roughly between 200 and 700 meters (660 and 2,300 ft) in height. Some mountains in the range are Mount Bonju, Mount Maruyakata, Tongari-dake, and Mount Manogami.
