= Ōdai Yamamoto I Site =

Archaeological site in Sotogahama, Japan

- 大平山元I遺跡 (Japanese)
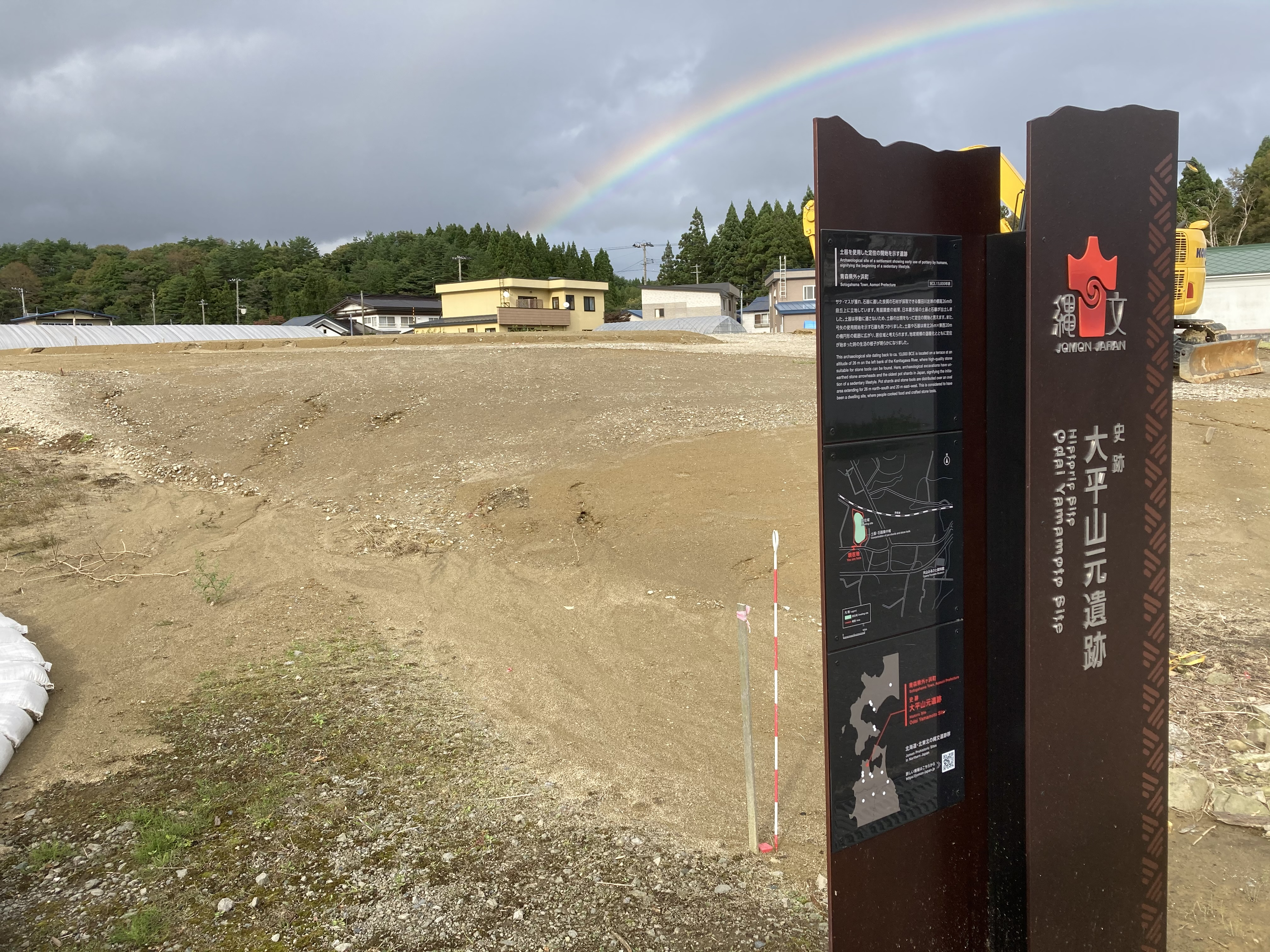
- Ōdai Yamamoto I Site

- Ōdai Yamamoto I site Ōdai Yamamoto I Site (Japan)
- 41°04′02″N 140°33′18″E
- Type: settlement
- Location: Sotogahama, Aomori, Japan
- Region: Tōhoku region

History
- Built: Jōmon period

Site notes
- Excavation dates: 1998
- Discovered: 1998
- Public access: Yes (facilities are under construction at the site)

Fragments of earthenware discovered at Ōdai Yamamoto I

The Ōdai Yamamoto I Site (Japanese: 大平山元I遺跡, Hepburn: Ōdaiyamamoto ichi iseki) is a Jōmon archaeological site in the town of Sotogahama, Aomori Prefecture, in the Tōhoku region of northern Japan. Excavations in 1998 uncovered forty-six earthenware fragments which have been dated as early as 14,500 BCE (ca 16,500 BP); this places them among the earliest pottery currently known. As the earliest in Japan, this marks the transition from the Japanese Paleolithic to Incipient Jōmon. Other pottery of a similar date has been found at Gasya and Khummi on the lower Amur River. Such a date puts the development of pottery before the warming at the end of the Pleistocene.

== Early history ==
The Ōdai Yamamoto I site is located on a fluvial terrace at an altitude of 26 meters (85 ft) on the left bank of the Kanita River that flows into Mutsu Bay on the eastern side of the Tsugaru Peninsula. Thirty of the forty-six fragments of pottery, all from the same vessel, had carbonized residues, suggesting its use for the cooking of foodstuffs. Eight AMS radiocarbon dates were generated from five of the fragments and three pieces of associated charred wood; these suggested a date of 11,800 to 11,500 BCE. With calibration, this dating was pushed back to 14,500 to 14,000, as early as around 16,500 BP. Other datings have given a range between 13780 ± 170 and 12680 ± 140 BCE. This makes the Ōdai Yamamoto I site important to the understanding of the transition between the Pleistocene and the Holocene.

== Modern history ==
The site forms part of a serial nomination submitted in 2009 for future inscription on the UNESCO World Heritage List, under criteria iii and iv: Jōmon Archaeological Sites in Hokkaidō, Northern Tōhoku, and other regions. In recognition of their importance, the excavated artifacts have been designated a Municipal Cultural Property.

Stoneware and pottery excavated from the Ōdai Yamamoto I site is preserved at the Oyama Furusato Museum at Oyama Elementary School. The site received protection as a National Historic Site of Japan in 2013. Other pottery of a similar date has been found at Gasya and Khummi on the lower Amur River.

== Interpretation ==
Pottery shards found during the rebuilding of a private residence in 1998 were submitted for radiocarbon dating by the Aomori Prefectural Board of Education, and were found to have been produced 16,500 years ago, making it the oldest known pottery in Japan and the second oldest known pottery in the world—the oldest was found in Hunan, China and dated about 1,000 years earlier. A total of 148 square meters (1,590 ft^{2}) was excavated in 1998. Further finds included axes, spearheads, arrowheads, scrapers, blades, and anvils, mostly of local shale but some also of obsidian. The arrowheads are of special significance as they push back the beginnings of the history of archery. As no indication of permanent dwellings have been found at the site, it is assumed that the ancient inhabitants of this area were still nomadic.

== Genetics ==
Jōmon samples from the Ōdai Yamamoto I site differ from Jōmon samples of Hokkaido and geographically close eastern Honshu. Ōdai Yamamoto Jōmon were found to have C1a1 and are genetically close to ancient and modern Northeast Asian groups but notably different from other Jōmon samples such as Ikawazu or Urawa Jōmon. Similarly, the Nagano Jōmon from the Yugora cave site are closely related to contemporary East Asians but genetically different from the Ainu people which are direct descendants of the Hokkaido Jōmon.

One study, published in the Cambridge University Press in 2020, suggests that the Jōmon people were rather heterogeneous, and that many Jōmon groups were descended from an ancient "Altaic-like" population (close to modern Tungusic-speakers, samplified by Oroqen), which established itself over the local hunter gatherers. This “Altaic-like” population migrated from Northeast Asia in about 6000BC, and coexisted with other unrelated tribes and/or intermixed with them, before being replaced by the later Yayoi people. C1a1 and C2 are linked to the "Tungusic-like people", which arrived in the Jōmon period archipelago from Northeast Asia in about 6,000 BCE and introduced the Incipient Jōmon culture, typified by early ceramic cultures such as the Ōdai Yamamoto I Site.

== See also ==
- Jōmon Archaeological Sites in Hokkaidō, Northern Tōhoku, and other regions
- List of Historic Sites of Japan (Aomori)
- Sannai-Maruyama Site
- Thermoluminescence dating
