= Kanita, Aomori =

Kanita 蟹田町
- Former municipality
- Flag Emblem

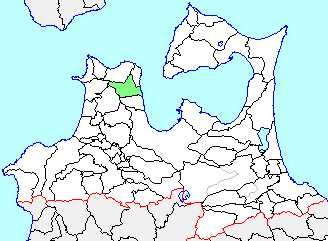
- Location of Kanita in Aomori Prefecture

- Location in Japan
- Coordinates: 41°2′49.9″N 140°38′23″E
- Country: Japan
- Region: Tōhoku
- Prefecture: Aomori Prefecture
- District: Higashitsugaru
- Merged: March 28, 2005 (now part of Sotogahama)

Area
  - Total: 116.39 km^{2} (44.94 sq mi)

Population (March 1, 2005)
  - Total: 3,745
  - Density: 32.17/km^{2} (83.3/sq mi)
- Time zone: UTC+09:00 (JST)
- Climate: Cfa/Dfa
- Symbols
- Bird: Common gull
- Flower: Dandelion
- Tree: Japanese black pine

Kanita (蟹田町, Kanita-machi) was a town located in Higashitsugaru District in northern Aomori Prefecture, Japan.

Kanita Town was located on the east coast of Tsugaru Peninsula bordering on Mutsu Bay. The area was part of Hirosaki Domain during the Edo period. After the Meiji Restoration, Kanita Village was created on April 1, 1889. It was elevated to town status on October 5, 1940.

On March 28, 2005, Kanita, along with the neighboring villages of Tairadate and Minmaya (all from Higashitsugaru District), was merged to create the town of Sotogahama, and thus no longer exists as an independent municipality.

At the time of its merger, Kanita had an estimated population of 3,745 and a population density of 32.17 persons per km^{2}. The total area was 116.39 km^{2}.

The town's economy was dominated by commercial fishing. Kanita was served by National Route 280, and by three stations on the Tsugaru Line of JR East.

== Climate ==
Climate data for Kanita, Aomori (1991−2020 normals, extremes 1976−present)
Month	Jan	Feb	Mar	Apr	May	Jun	Jul	Aug	Sep	Oct	Nov	Dec	Year
Record high °C (°F)	10.9 (51.6)	14.1 (57.4)	21.1 (70.0)	28.5 (83.3)	29.9 (85.8)	30.4 (86.7)	33.5 (92.3)	34.5 (94.1)	32.5 (90.5)	27.9 (82.2)	22.7 (72.9)	17.4 (63.3)	34.5 (94.1)
Mean daily maximum °C (°F)	1.6 (34.9)	2.3 (36.1)	6.0 (42.8)	11.9 (53.4)	16.7 (62.1)	19.9 (67.8)	23.6 (74.5)	25.7 (78.3)	23.2 (73.8)	17.5 (63.5)	10.7 (51.3)	4.2 (39.6)	13.6 (56.5)
Daily mean °C (°F)	−1.4 (29.5)	−1.0 (30.2)	2.0 (35.6)	7.2 (45.0)	12.1 (53.8)	16.0 (60.8)	20.3 (68.5)	22.2 (72.0)	18.7 (65.7)	12.2 (54.0)	6.2 (43.2)	0.7 (33.3)	9.6 (49.3)
Mean daily minimum °C (°F)	−4.8 (23.4)	−4.7 (23.5)	−2.3 (27.9)	2.2 (36.0)	7.7 (45.9)	12.6 (54.7)	17.5 (63.5)	19.0 (66.2)	14.3 (57.7)	7.0 (44.6)	1.7 (35.1)	−2.6 (27.3)	5.6 (42.2)
Record low °C (°F)	−16.2 (2.8)	−15.2 (4.6)	−13.6 (7.5)	−8.4 (16.9)	−1.3 (29.7)	4.3 (39.7)	8.0 (46.4)	9.6 (49.3)	3.4 (38.1)	−1.6 (29.1)	−6.8 (19.8)	−12.2 (10.0)	−16.2 (2.8)
Average precipitation mm (inches)	104.0 (4.09)	83.5 (3.29)	78.9 (3.11)	84.4 (3.32)	105.0 (4.13)	102.1 (4.02)	139.6 (5.50)	177.7 (7.00)	161.2 (6.35)	129.3 (5.09)	139.3 (5.48)	125.5 (4.94)	1,430.4 (56.31)
Average precipitation days (≥ 1.0 mm)	21.1	17.6	15.2	12.1	10.7	8.8	10.6	10.6	11.7	13.8	17.7	21.0	170.9
Mean monthly sunshine hours	54.3	78.8	139.0	191.9	199.4	170.7	136.4	164.0	166.0	153.3	89.7	54.1	1,597.5
Source: JMA
