= Higashitsugaru District, Aomori =

District in Aomori prefecture, Japan

Coordinates: 41.127°N 140.542°E

- Japan > Tōhoku region > Aomori Prefecture > Higashitsugaru District

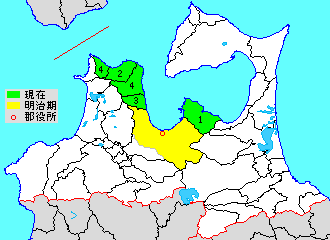
Map showing original extent of Higashitsugaru District in Aomori Prefecture green - current yellow - former extent in early Meiji period: 1. - Hiranai; 2. – Imabetsu; 3. - Kanita; 4. – Sotogahama

Higashitsugaru District (東津軽郡, Higashitsugaru-gun) is a rural district located in Aomori Prefecture, Japan. The district makes up the suburban area of the Aomori metropolitan area.

As of September 2013, the district had an estimated population of 24,011 and an area of 652.83 km^{2}. Much of the city of Aomori was formerly part of Higashitsugaru District. In terms of national politics, the district is represented in the Diet of Japan's House of Representatives as a part of the Aomori 1st district.

== Towns and villages ==
- Hiranai
- Imabetsu
- Sotogahama
- Yomogita

== History ==
The area of Higashitsugaru District was formerly part of Mutsu Province. At the time of the Meiji Restoration of 1868, the area consisted of one towns (Aomori) and 137 villages, formerly under the control of Hirosaki Domain and 28 villages under the control of Kuroishi Domain. Aomori Prefecture was founded on December 13, 1871, and Higashitsugaru District was carved out of the former Tsugaru District on October 30, 1878.

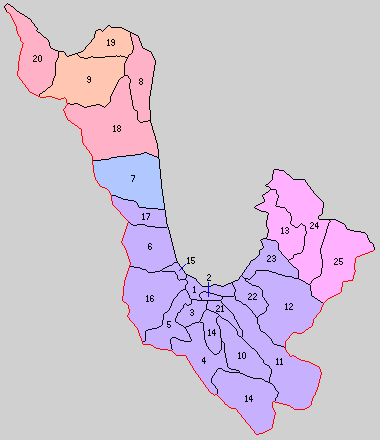
Historic Map of Higashitsugaru District: 1.Aomori 2.Uramachi 3.Ōno 4.Takada 5.Takiuchi 6.Okuuchi 7.Yomogita 8.Tairadate 9.Imabetsu 10.Yokouchi 11.Hamadate 12. Azumadake 13.Nishi-Hiranai 14.Arakawa 15.Aburakawa 16.Shinjo 17.Ushirogata 18.Kanita 19.Ippongi 20.Minmaya 21.Tsutsui 22.Harabetsu 23.Nonai 24.Naka-Hiranai, later Kominato 25. Higashi-Hiranai Purple= Aomori City, Pink=Hiranai, Orange=Imabtesu, Red=Sotogahama, Light Blue=Yomogita

With the establishment of the municipality system on April 1, 1889, Higashitsugaru District, organized into one town (Aomori) and 24 villages, was established. When a municipality is elevated to, or is absorbed into a city, it ceases to be part of a district. For example, when the village, Nonai was incorporated into the city of Aomori as a neighborhood, it ceased to be part of a rural district.

- 1898 – Aomori was elevated to city status.
- 1919 – Aburakawa was elevated to town status.
- 1928 – Kominato was elevated to town status
- 1939 – Aburakawa was merged into the city of Aomori
- 1941 – Kanita was raised to town status
- 1951 – Tsutsui was raised to town status
- 1955 – Kominato absorbed two neighboring villages to become the town of Hiranai. Imabetsu was also raised to town status
- 1962 – Nonai was merged into Aomori.
- On March 28, 2005 - the town of Kanita and the villages of Tairadate and Minmaya were merged to form the new town of Sotogahama.
