= Mount Bonju =

Mountain in the Tsugaru Mountains, Japan

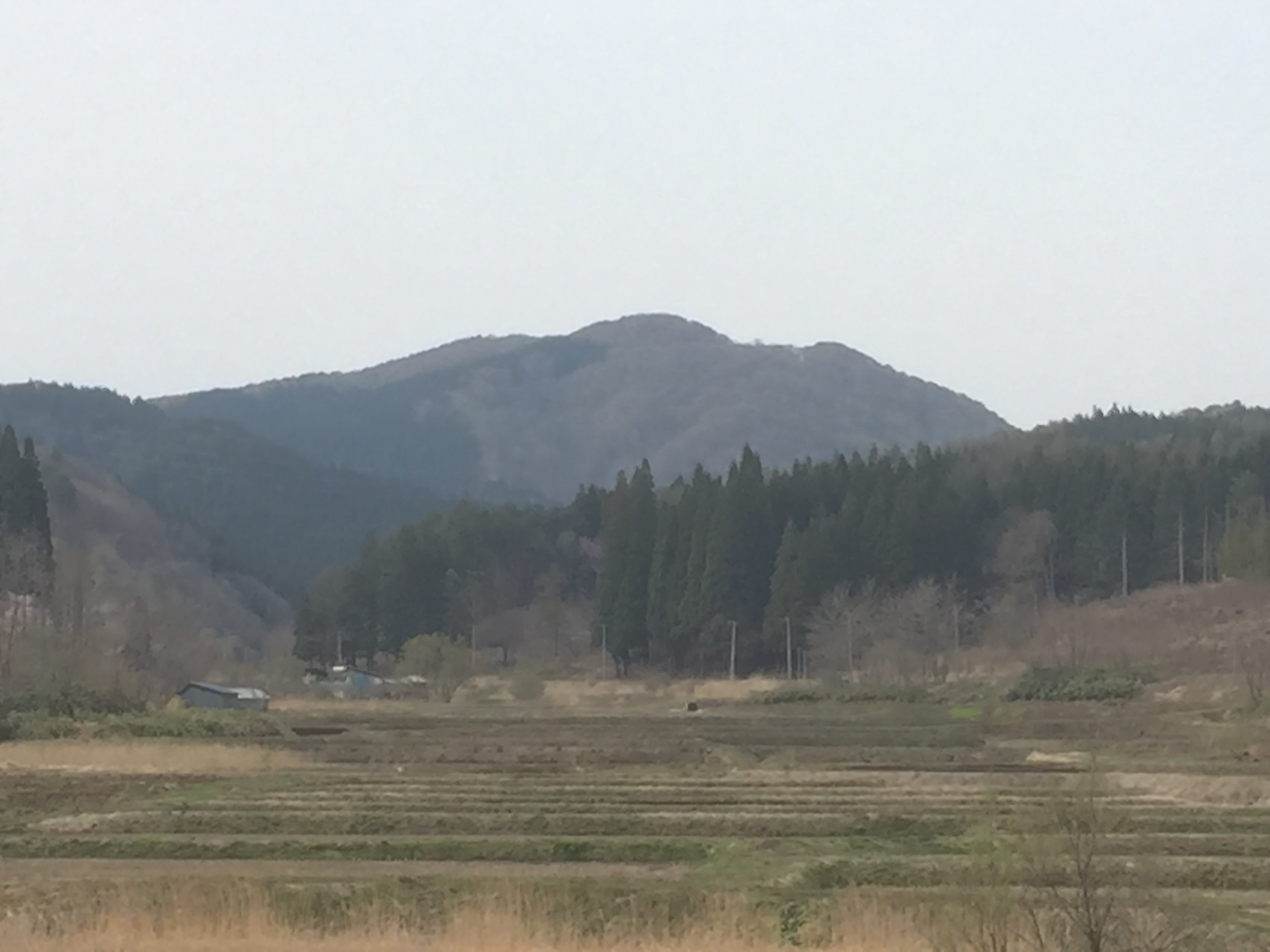
- Seen from south-southeast

Highest point
- Elevation: 468 m (1,535 ft)
- Coordinates: 40°48′0″N 140°34′32″E

Naming
- Native name: 梵珠山 (Japanese); Bonju-san (Japanese); ポニ (Ainu); Poni (Ainu)

Geography
- Location within Japan
- Location: Namioka, Aomori / Goshogawara, Japan
- Parent range: Tsugaru Mountains

Climbing
- Easiest route: footpath

Mount Bonju (梵珠山, Bonju-san) is a mountain located between Namioka, Aomori and Goshogawara, Japan near the southern end of the Tsugaru Mountains between the central part of Aomori and Goshogawara. The mountain lies within the Mount Bonju Prefectural Forest. Its peak lies within the city of Aomori. It has an elevation of 468 meters (1,535 ft).

== Geology ==
Mount Bonju is entirely made up of Miocene basalts, dacite, rhyolite near its peak with marine mudstone from the same epoch near its base. Blue agate can be found on the mountain. It, like the rest of the Tsugaru Mountains, was formed by uplifting caused by the reverse faults of the Aomori Bay West Coast Fault Zone.

== Human history ==
Local lore claims that some of Shakyamuni Buddha's cremated remains are entombed in a burial mound on the mountain. A pilgrimage is held on 9 July every year to see an onibi over the mound where the relic is claimed to be buried.

The mountain and the forest surrounding it was designated as the Mount Bonju Prefectural Forest in 1968 by the government of Aomori Prefecture as a commemoration to the centennial of its founding. Trails were placed throughout the newly designated land. In July 1992, the "Prefectural Nature Fureai Center" was opened by the prefectural government.

== Climbing and recreation ==
Three trails reach the summit of the mountain. A visitor center with a parking lot lies at the base of the mountain on its southeastern flank. It functions as a basecamp for the mountain and a variety of events are held there, guides to the mountain and forest are stationed out of the nature center. Camping and hiking is free to all visitors.
