= Aomori metropolitan area =

Aomori metropolitan area 青森都市圏
- Metropolitan area
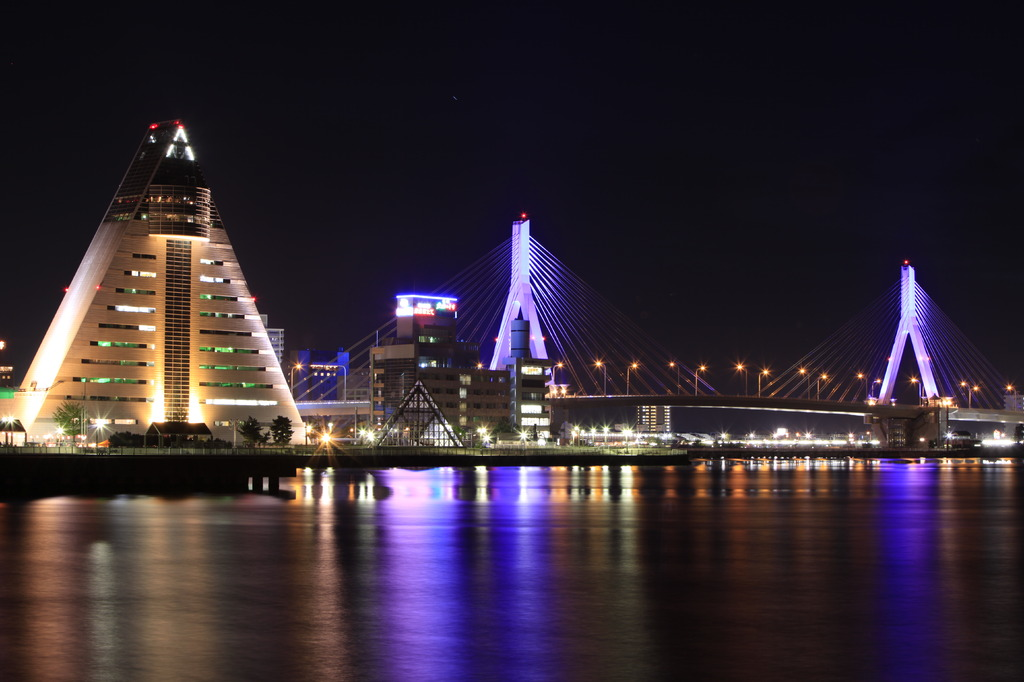
- Aomori

- Location in Japan
- Coordinates: 40°49′N 140°43′E
- Country: Japan
- Cities: Aomori
- Towns and villages: Hiranai, Imabetsu, Sotogahama, Yomogita

Area
  - Metro: 1,477.37 km^{2} (570.42 sq mi)

Population (Population Census of Japan 2010)
  - Metropolitan area: 310,640

The Aomori metropolitan area (青森都市圏, Aomori toshi-ken), also known as the Tōsei area (東青地域, Tōsei chiiki) is a metropolitan region in the Japanese prefecture of Aomori that includes the city of Aomori and its surrounding satellites, Hiranai, Imabetsu, Sotogahama, and Yomogita. The metropolitan area is defined as the Aomori Urban Employment Area by the Statistics Bureau of Japan (SBJ) and the Center for Spatial Information Service of the University of Tokyo.

== Demographics ==
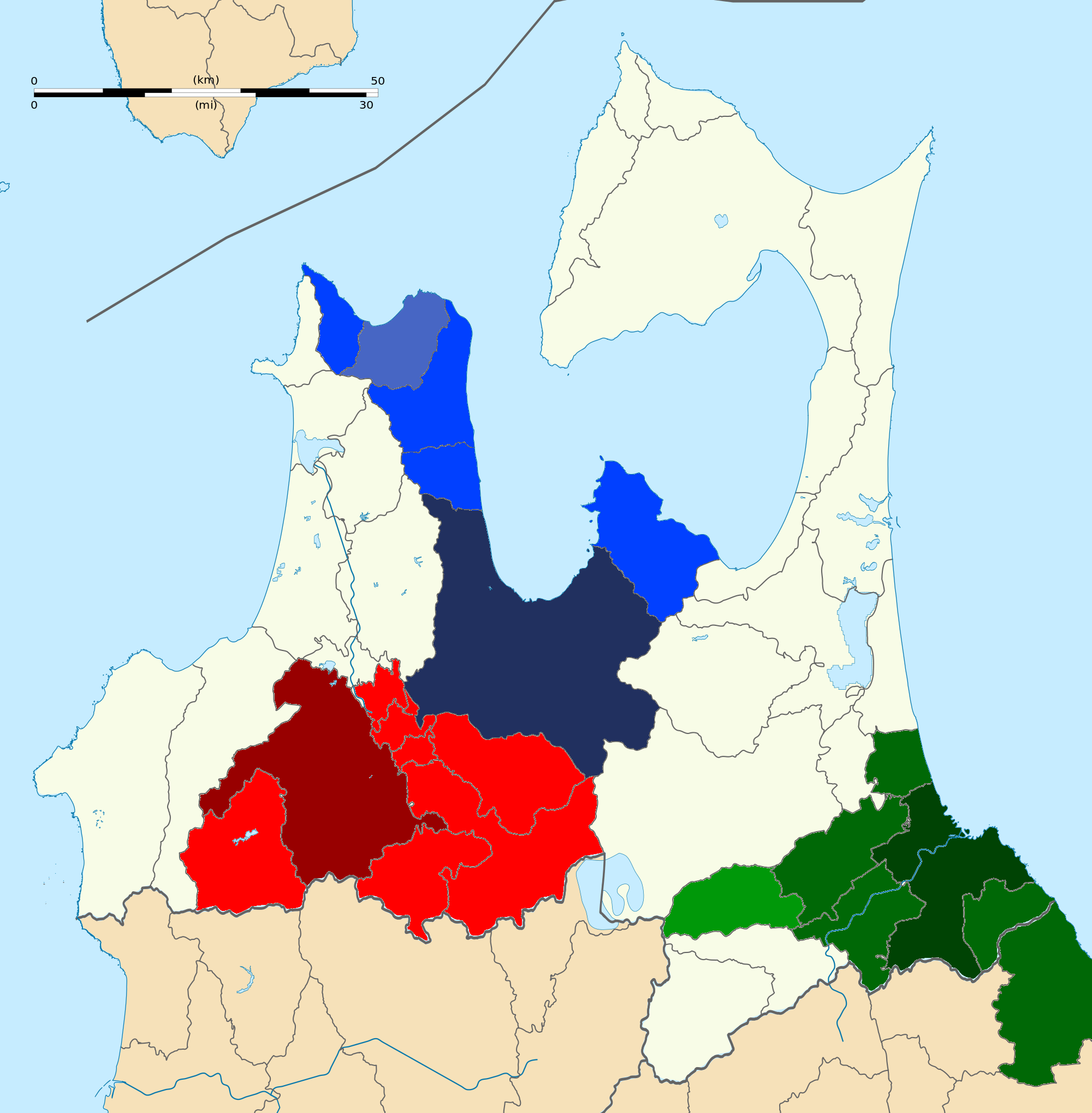
The metropolitan areas of Aomori Prefecture. Greater Aomori is shaded in blue.

As of 2015, Greater Aomori had a population of 310,640. Due to the area's aging population, its population is expected to fall by 74,265 at least to 236,375 people by 2045, though more harsh estimates project a population of 192,673 by 2045.

== Transportation ==
=== Air ===
- Aomori Airport

=== Major highways ===
- Tōhoku Expressway
- Aomori Expressway
- Michinoku Toll Road
- Tsugaru Expressway
- National Route 4
- National Route 7
- National Route 45 (unsigned)
- National Route 101
- National Route 103
- National Route 280
- National Route 339
- National Route 394

=== Rail ===
Greater Aomori has a network of railway lines. Main rail terminals in the area include, Aomori Station, Shin-Aomori Station, and Okutsugaru-Imabetsu Station.

==== High speed rail ====
JR East and JR Hokkaido operate high-speed trains on the Tōhoku-Hokkaido Shinkansen line. Shin-Aomori Station acts as the Shinkansen terminal station, though the two lines are physically joined, and many trains offer through service. This station is connected to Aomori Station in central Aomori by the Ōu Main Line. The smaller high-speed station, Okutsugaru-Imabetsu Station is also within Greater Aomori.

==== Commuter rail ====
Both JR East and private lines connect Aomori and its suburbs. The Aoimori Railway Line is operated by the Aoimori Railway Company, a "third-sector" publicly and privately owned company. It connects Aomori Station and central Aomori to Hiranai in Greater Aomori and continues towards Noheji, Misawa, and Hachinohe. The Tsugaru and Ōu lines operated by JR East have termini at Aomori Station. The Ōu Main Line connects Aomori to Hirosaki and points to the south, while the Tsugaru Line connects Aomori Station and Minmaya Station in the town of Sotogahama on the northern tip of the Tsugaru Peninsula.

== See also ==
- List of metropolitan areas in Japan
