= Tsutsui, Aomori =

Tsutsui 筒井町
- Former municipality
- Location in Japan
- Coordinates: 40°48′08.7″N 140°46′31.6″E
- Country: Japan
- Region: Tōhoku
- Prefecture: Aomori Prefecture
- District: Higashitsugaru
- Merged: January 1, 1955 (now part of Aomori)

Population (1950)
  - Total: 6,111
- Time zone: UTC+09:00 (JST)

Tsutsui (野内村, Tsutsui-machi) was a town located in Higashitsugaru District in central Aomori Prefecture, Japan. It is now a neighborhood of the city, Aomori.

== History ==
Nonai was created by a merger of the villages of Tsutsui, Kobata, Ura, and Hamada on April 1, 1889. The village was elevated to a town in 1952. The town was annexed by Aomori on January 1, 1955, along with several other municipalities.

== Geography ==
Tsutsui was located on the plain that lies between the Hakkōda Mountains and Aomori Bay. The town had two rivers flowing through it, the Komagome River and its tributary, the Arakawa River.

=== Neighbouring municipalities ===
These were the neighboring municipalities of Tsutsui just before its incorporation into Aomori.

- Aomori
- Hamadate
- Arakawa
- Yokouchi

== Transportation ==
- Japan National Railways
  - Tōhoku Main Line – currently Aoimori Railway Line
    - No train station was extant in the town; however Tsutsui Station was opened to serve the area of the former town in 2014.
