= Tairadate, Aomori =

Tairadate 平舘村
- Former municipality
- Flag Seal

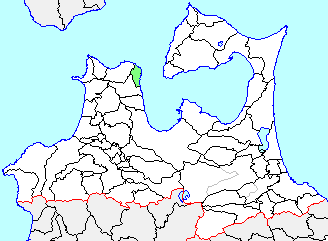
- Location of Tairadate in Aomori Prefecture

- Location in Japan
- Coordinates: 41°9′1″N 140°38′14.9″E
- Country: Japan
- Region: Tōhoku
- Prefecture: Aomori Prefecture
- District: Higashitsugaru
- Merged: March 28, 2005 (now part of Sotogahama)

Area
  - Total: 48.19 km^{2} (18.61 sq mi)

Population (March 1, 2005)
  - Total: 2,255
  - Density: 46.79/km^{2} (121.2/sq mi)
- Time zone: UTC+09:00 (JST)
- Symbols
- Bird: Black-tailed gull
- Flower: Rosa rugosa
- Tree: Japanese black pine

Tairadate (平舘村, Tairadate-mura) was a village located in Higashitsugaru District in northern Aomori Prefecture, Japan.

== Geography ==
Tairadate Village was located on the northeast coast of Tsugaru Peninsula bordering on Tsugaru Strait and the entrance to Mutsu Bay.

== History ==
The area was part of Hirosaki Domain during the Edo period. After the Meiji Restoration, Tairadate Village was created on April 1, 1889.

On March 28, 2005, Tairadate, along with the neighboring town of Kanita, and the village of Minmaya (all from Higashitsugaru District), was merged to create the town of Sotogahama, and thus no longer exists as an independent municipality.

== Population ==
At the time of its merger, Tairadate had an estimated population of 2,255 and a density of 46.79 persons per km^{2}. The total area was 48.19 km^{2}.

== Economy ==
The village economy was dominated by commercial fishing. Tairadate was served by National Route 280.
