= Sotogahama =

Sotogahama 外ヶ浜町
- Town
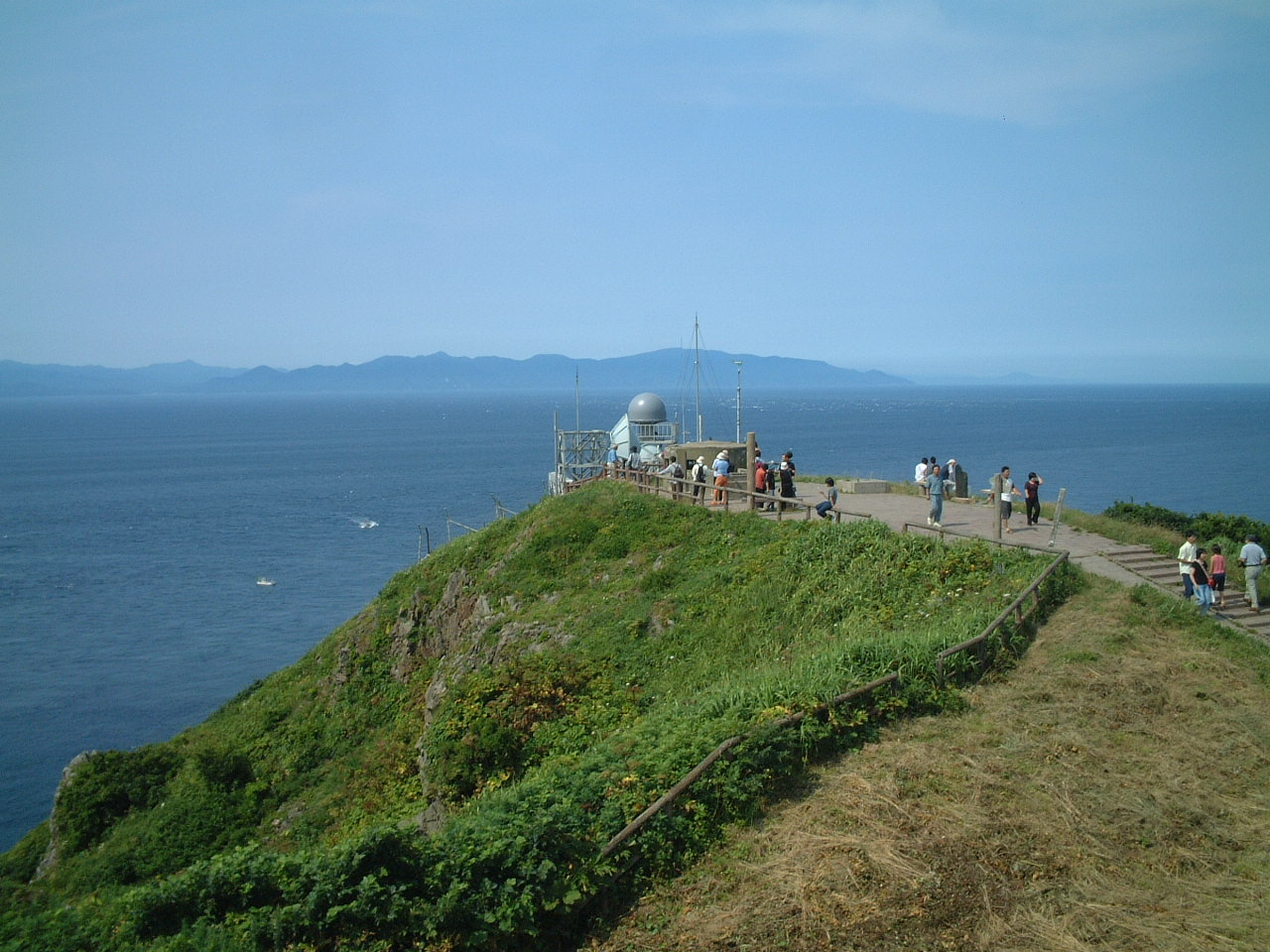
- Cape Tappi, northernmost point of Tsugaru Peninsula

- Flag Seal
- Location of Sotagahama in Aomori Prefecture

- Coordinates: 41°02′35.7″N 140°37′56.4″E
- Country: Japan
- Region: Tōhoku
- Prefecture: Aomori
- District: Higashitsugaru

Area
  - Total: 230.30 km^{2} (88.92 sq mi)

Population (February 28, 2026)
  - Total: 4,775
  - Density: 20.73/km^{2} (53.70/sq mi)
- Time zone: UTC+9 (Japan Standard Time)
- Phone number: 0174-31-1111
- Address: Kanita, Takadoya 44-2, Sotogahama-machi, Higashitsugaru-gun, Aomori-ken 030-1393
- Website: Official website
- Symbols
- Bird: Common gull
- Flower: Hydrangea
- Tree: Japanese black pine

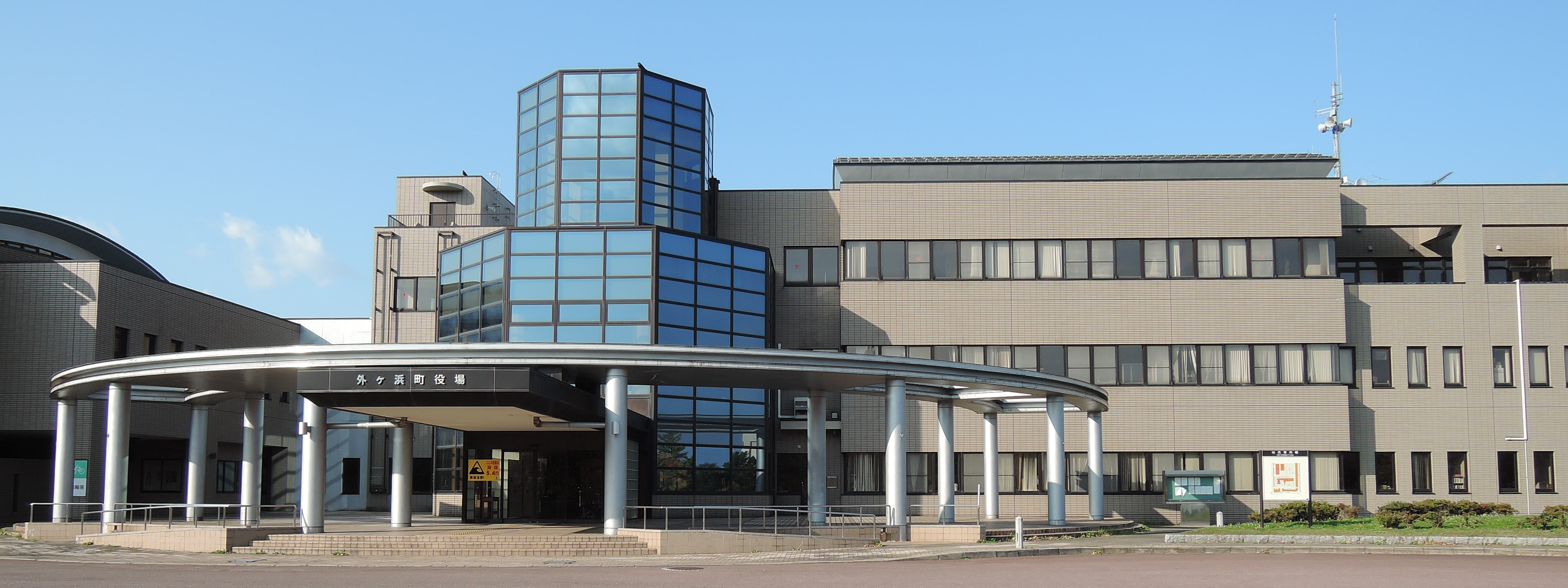
Sotogahama town hall

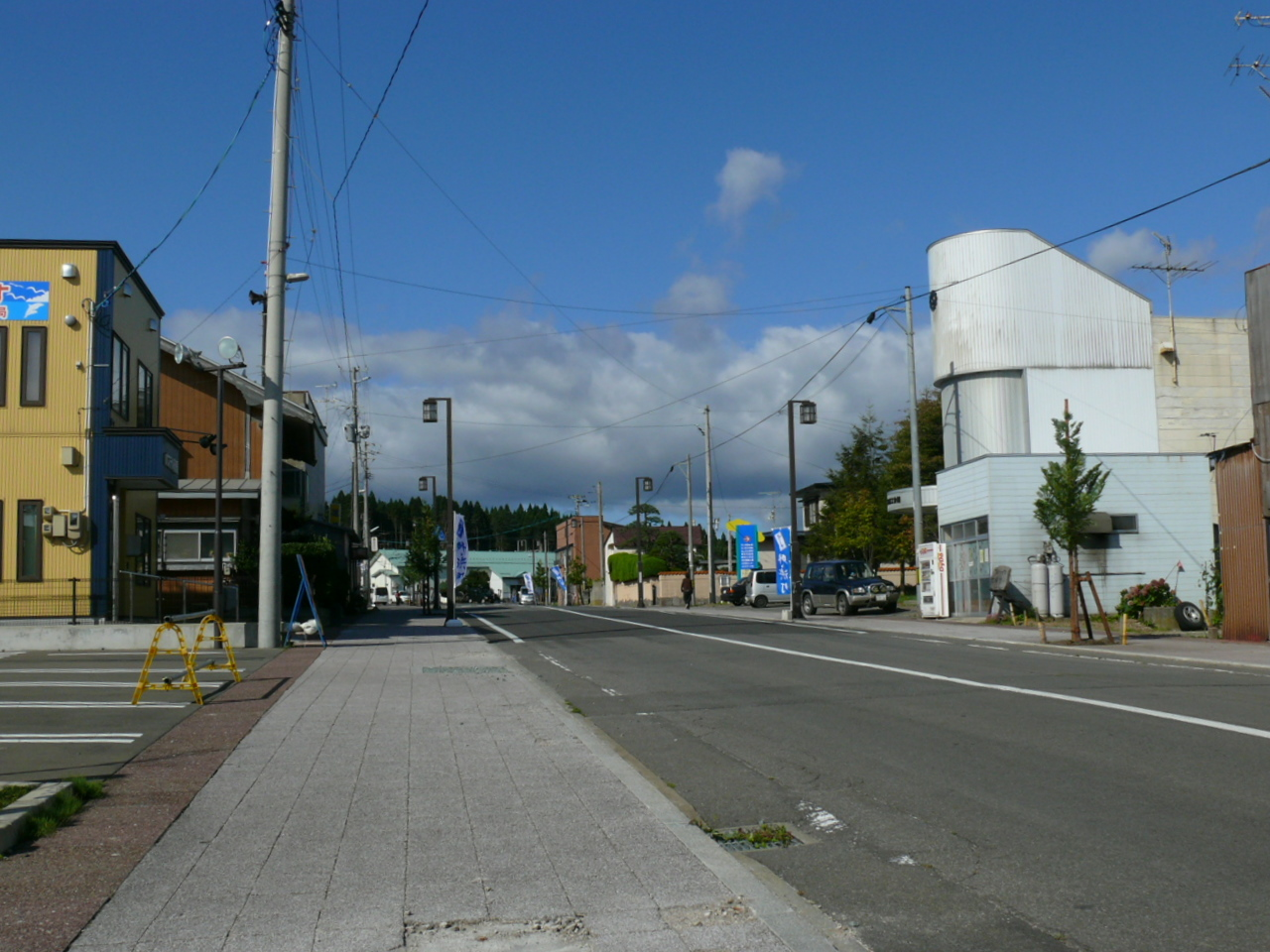
Central Kanita

Sotogahama (外ヶ浜町, Sotogahama-machi) is a town located in Aomori Prefecture, Japan and a part of the Aomori metropolitan area. As of 28 February 2026, the town had an estimated population of 4,775 in 2562 households, and a population density of 21 persons per km^{2}. The total area of the town is 230.30 square kilometres (88.92 sq mi).

== Geography ==
Sotogahama is in Higashitsugaru District of Aomori Prefecture, and consists of two discontinuous geographic areas in northern Tsugaru Peninsula. The larger area is in the south, and consists of the former town of Kanita with a coastline on Mutsu Bay, and the former village of Tairadate in the centre of northern Tsugaru Peninsula. The smaller area is in the north, and consists of the former village of Minmaya with a coastline on the Tsugaru Strait. Much of the town is within the limits of the Tsugaru Quasi-National Park. Most of the settlements and arable land are located along the coastline, with about 89% of the total area of town as mountainous national forest.

=== Neighbouring municipalities ===
Aomori Prefecture

- Goshogawara
- Imabetsu
- Nakadomari
- Yomogita

=== Climate ===
The town has a cold humid continental climate (Köppen Cfb) characterized by warm, short summers and long, cold winters with heavy snowfall. The average annual temperature in Sotogahama is 10.0 °C. The average annual rainfall is 1267 mm with September as the wettest month. The temperatures are highest on average in August, at around 22.8 °C, and lowest in January, at around -1.8 °C.

Climate data for Kanita（1991–2020 normals, extremes 1977–present）
Month	Jan	Feb	Mar	Apr	May	Jun	Jul	Aug	Sep	Oct	Nov	Dec	Year
Record high °C (°F)	10.9 (51.6)	14.1 (57.4)	21.1 (70.0)	28.5 (83.3)	29.9 (85.8)	30.4 (86.7)	33.5 (92.3)	34.6 (94.3)	33.6 (92.5)	27.9 (82.2)	23.1 (73.6)	17.4 (63.3)	34.6 (94.3)
Mean daily maximum °C (°F)	1.6 (34.9)	2.3 (36.1)	6.0 (42.8)	11.9 (53.4)	16.7 (62.1)	19.9 (67.8)	23.6 (74.5)	25.7 (78.3)	23.2 (73.8)	17.5 (63.5)	10.7 (51.3)	4.2 (39.6)	13.6 (56.5)
Daily mean °C (°F)	−1.4 (29.5)	−1.0 (30.2)	2.0 (35.6)	7.2 (45.0)	12.1 (53.8)	16.0 (60.8)	20.3 (68.5)	22.2 (72.0)	18.7 (65.7)	12.2 (54.0)	6.2 (43.2)	0.7 (33.3)	9.6 (49.3)
Mean daily minimum °C (°F)	−4.8 (23.4)	−4.7 (23.5)	−2.3 (27.9)	2.2 (36.0)	7.7 (45.9)	12.6 (54.7)	17.5 (63.5)	19.0 (66.2)	14.3 (57.7)	7.0 (44.6)	1.7 (35.1)	−2.6 (27.3)	5.6 (42.1)
Record low °C (°F)	−16.2 (2.8)	−15.2 (4.6)	−13.6 (7.5)	−8.4 (16.9)	−1.3 (29.7)	4.3 (39.7)	8.8 (47.8)	9.6 (49.3)	3.4 (38.1)	−1.6 (29.1)	−6.8 (19.8)	−12.2 (10.0)	−16.2 (2.8)
Average precipitation mm (inches)	104.0 (4.09)	83.5 (3.29)	78.9 (3.11)	84.4 (3.32)	105.0 (4.13)	102.1 (4.02)	139.6 (5.50)	177.7 (7.00)	161.2 (6.35)	129.3 (5.09)	139.3 (5.48)	125.5 (4.94)	1,430.4 (56.31)
Average precipitation days (≥ 1.0 mm)	21.1	17.6	15.2	12.1	10.7	8.8	10.6	10.6	11.7	13.8	17.7	21.0	170.8
Mean monthly sunshine hours	54.3	78.8	139.0	191.9	199.4	170.7	136.4	164.0	166.0	153.3	89.7	54.1	1,597.5
Source 1: Japan Meteorological Agency
Source 2: Japan Meteorological Agency

== Demographics ==
Per Japanese census data, the population of Sotogahama has decreased by more than half over the past 60 years and is now considerably less than it was a century ago.

Historical population

Year	Pop.	±%
1920	11,883	—
1930	13,913	+17.1%
1940	15,027	+8.0%
1950	18,964	+26.2%
1960	18,259	−3.7%
1970	16,258	−11.0%

Year	Pop.	±%
1980	14,955	−8.0%
1990	10,663	−28.7%
2000	9,170	−14.0%
2010	7,089	−22.7%
2020	5,401	−23.8%

== History ==
The Tsugaru Peninsula has been inhabited since Japanese Paleolithic times, and some of the world's oldest pottery has been discovered at the Odai Yamamoto I site. The area around Sotogahama was controlled by the Tsugaru clan of Hirosaki Domain during the Edo period. During the post-Meiji restoration establishment of the modern municipalities system on April 1, 1889 Minmaya, Kanita and Tairadate villages were separated from Imabetsu. On March 28, 2005, these three municipalities merged to form the new town of Sotogahama. Minmaya is a geographically discontinuous enclave from the town's center in Kanita.

== Government ==
Sotogahama has a mayor-council form of government with a directly elected mayor and a unicameral town legislature of 11 members. It is part of Higashitsugaru District, which contributes one member to the Aomori Prefectural Assembly. In terms of national politics, the town is part of Aomori 1st district of the lower house of the Diet of Japan.

== Economy ==
The economy of Sotogahama is heavily dependent on commercial fishing. Some of the locally caught seafood include sea urchin roe, sea pineapple, sea cucumber, scallops, abalone and squid.

== Education ==
Sotogahama has two public elementary schools and two public junior high schools operated by the town government. The town does not have a high school.

== Transportation ==
=== Railway ===
East Japan Railway Company (JR East) - Tsugaru Line

- Kanita, Naka-Oguni, Ōdai, Minmaya

Hokkaidō Railway Company (JR Hokkaido) - Kaikyō Line

- Tappi-Kaitei

=== Highway ===
- National Route 280
- National Route 339

== Local attractions ==
- Cape Tappi, the northwestern tip of Honshu
- Tappizaki Lighthouse, one of the “50 Lighthouses of Japan” by the Japan Lighthouse Association.
- Odai Yamamoto I site, National Historic Site
- Tairadate Battery ruins, Aomori Prefectural Historic Site

== Noted people from Sotogahama ==
- Jackal Maruyama, boxer
- Takuya Tazawa, nonfiction writer
