= Hakodate-Esashi Expressway =

Expressway in Hokkaido, Japan

Hakodate-Esashi Expressway
- 函館江差自動車道

Route information
- Length: 34.0 km (21.1 mi)
- Existed: 2003–present

Major junctions
- North end: Hakodate Shindō at Hakodate Junction
- South end: National Route 228 at Kikonai Interchange

Location
- Country: Japan
- Major cities: Hakodate; Hokuto; Kikonai

Highway system
- National highways of Japan; Expressways of Japan

The Hakodate-Esashi Expressway (函館江差自動車道, Hakodate-Esashi Jidōshadō) is an incomplete two-lane national expressway in Oshima Subprefecture of Hokkaido, Japan. It is owned and operated by Ministry of Land, Infrastructure, Transport and Tourism and is signed E5A as an extension of the Hokkaido Expressway under the "2016 Proposal for Realization of Expressway Numbering."

== Route description ==
Officially, the current (as of January 2019) section of expressway open is known as the Hakodate-Kikonai Road. It is 34.0 kilometres (21.1 mi) long. The speed limit is set at 100 km/h along its entirety. With the exception of a short section at Hakodate Junction, the expressway only has one lane in each direction.

The roads northern terminus is at an interchange with Hakodate Shindō, a southern extension of the Hokkaido Expressway. From here the road travels west out of Hakodate and in to Hokuto. Upon entering Hokuto it has a junction with Japan National Route 227. It then crosses the Kunebetsu and Ōno rivers before another junction, this time with Hokkaido Route 96. From here, the route curves to the southwest, roughly paralleling the Hokkaido Shinkansen rail line, while the older Esashi Line winds back and forth alongside the expressway. The expressway abruptly meets in temporary southern terminus at Hokkaido Route 1167 in the southern part of Hokuto near Moheji Station.

== History ==
The expressway was first opened between Hakodate Junction and Hokuto-chūō Interchange in 2003. At the time of construction, the open interchanges in Hokuto had different names. Those interchanges were renamed Hokuto-Oiwake and Hokuto-chūō in October 2009. Shortly after, in November of the same year, the expressway was extended to Hokuto-Tomigawa. After that, in March 2012 the expressway was extended to Hokuto-Moheji. Most recently, in March 26, 2022 the expressway was extended to Kikonai.

== Future ==
Construction is underway to extend the expressway 16.0 kilometres (9.9 mi) to Kikonai; however, progress was delayed due to the finding of Jōmon period relics in the construction area. The completion date for this extension is March 26, 2022.

== Junction list ==
The entire expressway is in Hokkaido.

Location	km	mi	Exit	Name	Destinations	Notes
Through to National Route 278 (Hakodate Shinsotokan Road), Hakodate Airport
Hakodate	0	0.0	1	Hakodate	Hakodate Shindō– Nanae, Sapporo, Shin-Hakodate-Hokuto Station	Northern terminus.
Hokuto	3.4	2.1	2	Hokuto-Oiwake	National Route 227	
Hokuto	8.0	5.0	3	Hokuto-chūō	Hokkaido Route 96	
Hokuto	12.6	7.8	4	Hokuto-Tomigawa	National Route 228	Northbound entrance and southbound exit only
Hokuto	18.0	11.2	5	Hokuto-Moheji	Hokkaido Route 1167	
Kikonai	34.0	21.1	6	Kikonai	National Route 228	Current southern terminus as of March 2022
1.000 mi = 1.609 km; 1.000 km = 0.621 mi: Incomplete access
