= Tsugaru Quasi-National Park =

Quasi-national park of Japan

- 津軽国定公園
- IUCN category V (protected landscape/seascape)
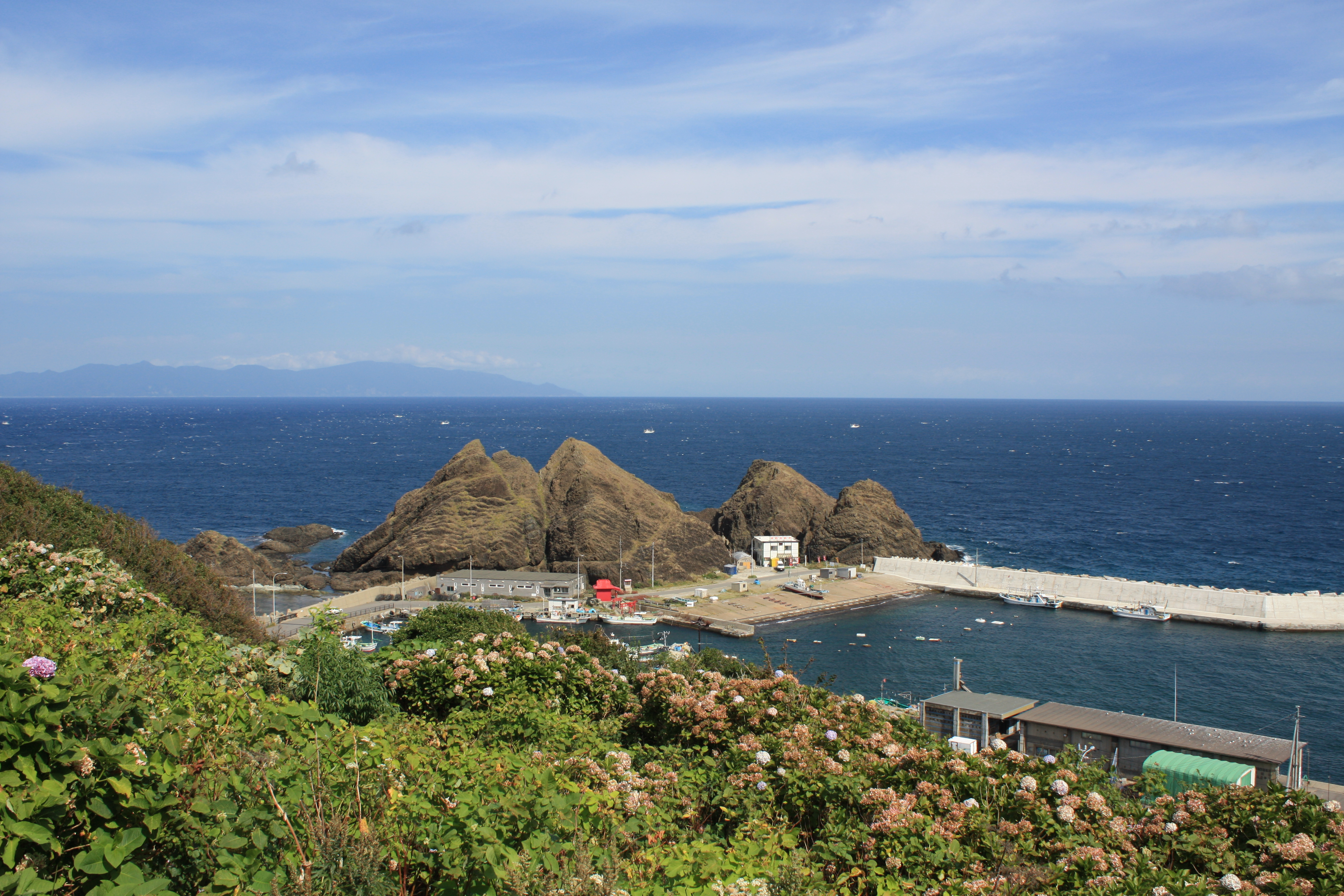
- coastal area near Cape Tappi, Tsugaru QNP
- Interactive map of Tsugaru Quasi-National Park
- Location: Honshū, Japan
- Coordinates: 41°10′1″N 140°35′25″E
- Area: 259.7 km^{2} (100.3 sq mi)
- Established: 31 March 1975
- Governing body: Government of Aomori Prefecture

Tsugaru Quasi-National Park (津軽国定公園, Tsugaru Kokutei Kōen) is a quasi-national park in Aomori Prefecture in the far northern Tōhoku region of Honshū in Japan. It is rated a protected landscape (category V) according to the IUCN. The park includes a number of discontinuous areas on Tsugaru Peninsula, including the volcanic peaks of Mount Iwaki, a portion of the primeval Siebold's beech forests of Shirakami-Sanchi UNESCO World Heritage Site, Cape Tappi, other coastal areas of northern Tsugaru Peninsula, and the wetlands of Juniko and Jusanko lakes and marshes.

The area was designated a quasi-national park on 31 March 1975. It spans the borders of the municipalities of Hirosaki, Goshogawara, Tsugaru, Imabetsu, Sotogahama, Ajigasawa, Fukaura, and Nakadomari.

Like all quasi-national parks in Japan, the park is managed by the local prefectural government, in this case, that of Aomori Prefecture.

== See also ==
- List of national parks of Japan
