= Hakodate Shindō =

Road in Hokkaido, Japan

Hakodate Shindō
- 国道%route%号
- 函館新道 (Hakodate Shindō)

Route information
- Maintained by Ministry of Land, Infrastructure, Transport and Tourism
- Length: 11.0 km (6.8 mi)
- Existed: 2000–present
- Component highways: National Route 5

Major junctions
- South end: Hakodate. National Route 5 / National Route 278 / Hakodate-Esashi Expressway
- North end: Nanae. National Route 5

Location
- Country: Japan

Highway system
- National highways of Japan; Expressways of Japan

The Hakodate Shindō (函館新道) is an incomplete national Expressway in Oshima Subprefecture in Hokkaido that connects central Hakodate to Japan National Route 5 and when completed, the Hokkaido Expressway, in Nanae. It is owned and operated by Ministry of Land, Infrastructure, Transport and Tourism and is signed E5 as an extension of the Hokkaido Expressway.

== Route description ==
The Hakodate Shindō has two lanes in direction from its southern terminus in Hakodate to Nanae-Honchō interchange. The remainder of the road only has one lane in direction.

== History ==
The expressway was opened between the interchanges at Hakodate and Nanae-Honchō on 30 March 2000. The remaining 4.2 km north of Nanae-Honchō was opened on 24 March 2001.

== Junction list ==
The entire expressway is in Hokkaido.

| Location | km | mi | Destinations | Notes | | |
|---|---|---|---|---|---|---|
Roadway continues as National Route 5
| Hakodate | 0 | 0.0 | | Hakodate | National Route 278 / Hakodate-Esashi Expressway | Southern terminus |
| Nanae | 3.0 | 1.9 | | Nanae-Ōkawa | Hokkaido Route 969 | |
| Nanae | 6.8 | 4.2 | | Nanae-Honchō | Hokkaido Route 264 west / Shirotai Skyline north | |
| Nanae | 11.0 | 6.8 | | Nanae-Fujishiro | National Route 5 | Current northern terminus |
Roadway continues as National Route 5 to Dō-Ō Expressway
1.000 mi = 1.609 km; 1.000 km = 0.621 mi: Route transition
