= Minmaya, Aomori =

Minmaya 三厩村
- Former municipality
- Flag Emblem

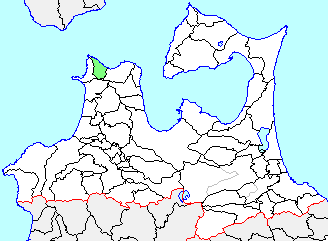
- Location of Minmaya in Aomori Prefecture

- Location in Japan
- Coordinates: 41°11′49.3″N 140°25′47.6″E
- Country: Japan
- Region: Tōhoku
- Prefecture: Aomori Prefecture
- District: Higashitsugaru
- Merged: March 28, 2005 (now part of Sotogahama)

Area
  - Total: 65.34 km^{2} (25.23 sq mi)

Population (March 1, 2005)
  - Total: 2,364
  - Density: 36.19/km^{2} (93.7/sq mi)
- Time zone: UTC+09:00 (JST)
- Symbols
- Bird: Common gull
- Flower: Hydrangea
- Tree: Hiba

Minmaya (三厩村, Minmaya-mura) was a village located in Higashitsugaru District in northern Aomori Prefecture, Japan.

Minmaya Village was located on the north coast of Tsugaru Peninsula bordering on Tsugaru Strait. The area was part of Hirosaki Domain during the Edo period. After the Meiji Restoration, Minmaya Village was created on April 1, 1889.

On March 28, 2005, Minmaya, along with the neighboring town of Kanita, and the village of Tairadate (all from Higashitsugaru District), was merged to create the town of Sotogahama, and thus no longer exists as an independent municipality.

At the time of its merger, Minmaya had an estimated population of 2,364 and a population density of 36.19 persons per km^{2}. The total area was 65.34 km^{2}.

The village economy was dominated by commercial fishing. Minmaya was served by Route 339 (Japan) highway, and by Minmaya Station on the Tsugaru Line of JR East.
