= Japan National Route 228 =

Road in Hokkaido, Japan

National Route 228
- 国道228号
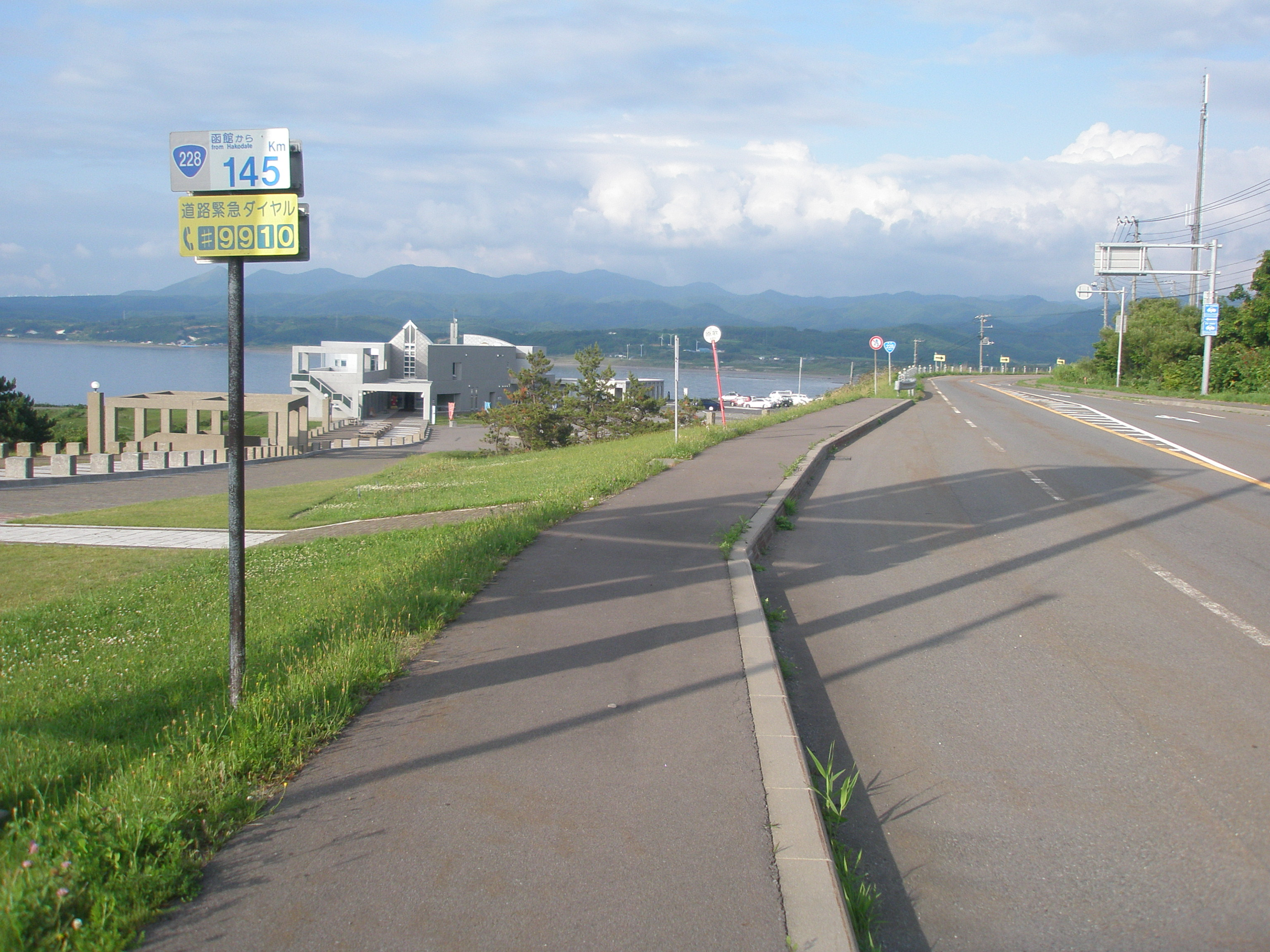

Route information
- Length: 151.5 km (94.1 mi)

Location
- Country: Japan

Highway system
- National highways of Japan; Expressways of Japan
← National Route 227	→ National Route 229

National Route 228 is a national highway of Japan connecting Hakodate, Hokkaidō and Esashi, Hokkaidō in Japan, with a total length of 151.5 km (94.14 mi).
