= Japan National Route 227 =

Road in Hokkaido, Japan

National Route 227
- 国道227号
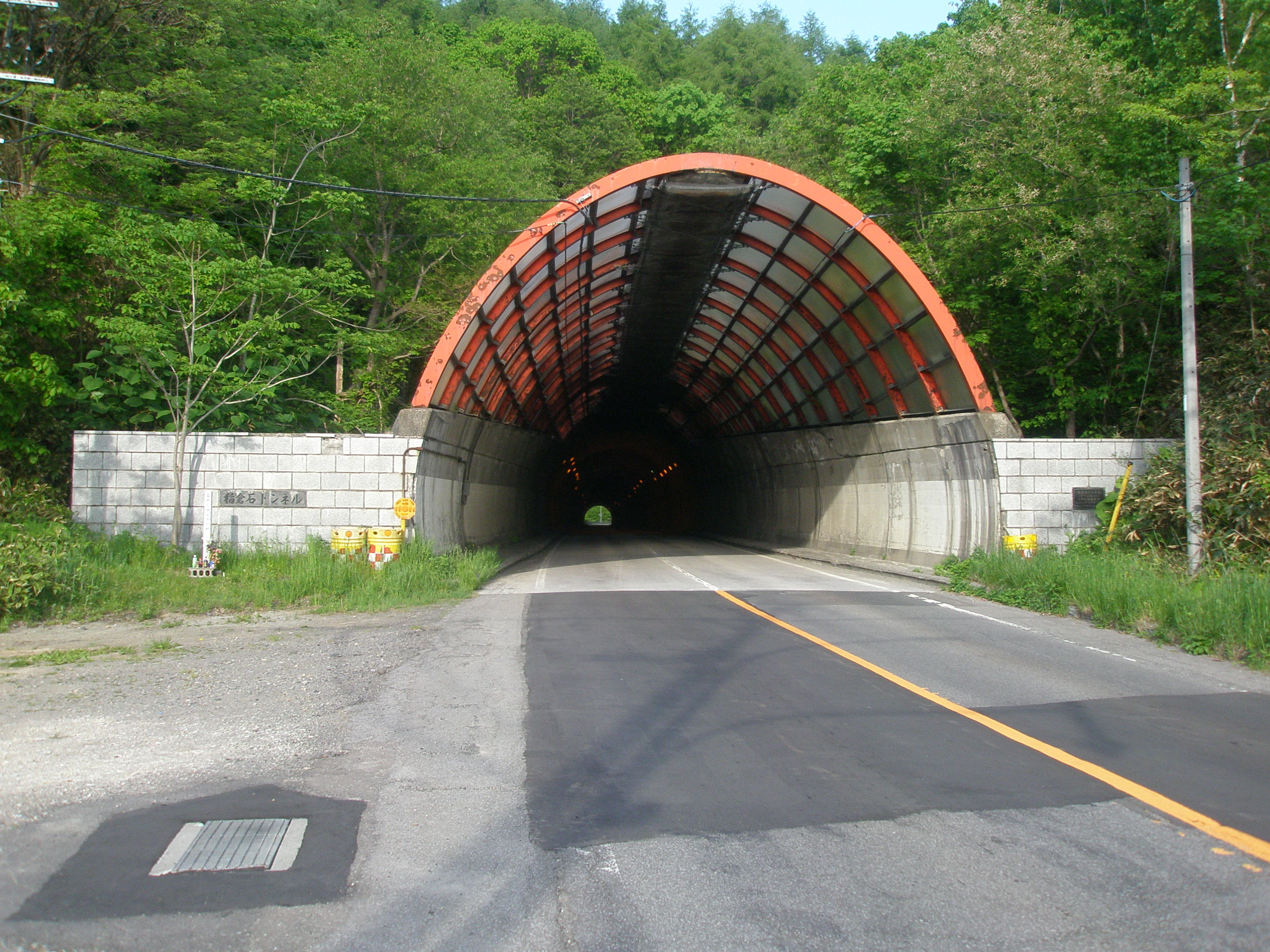

Route information
- Length: 69.7 km (43.3 mi)

Location
- Country: Japan

Highway system
- National highways of Japan; Expressways of Japan
← National Route 226	→ National Route 228

National Route 227 is a national highway of Japan connecting Hakodate, Hokkaido and Esashi, Hokkaido in Japan, with a total length of 69.7 km (43.31 mi).
