= Cape Tappi =

Topographical feature in Japan

Cape Tappi 竜飛崎
- Cape
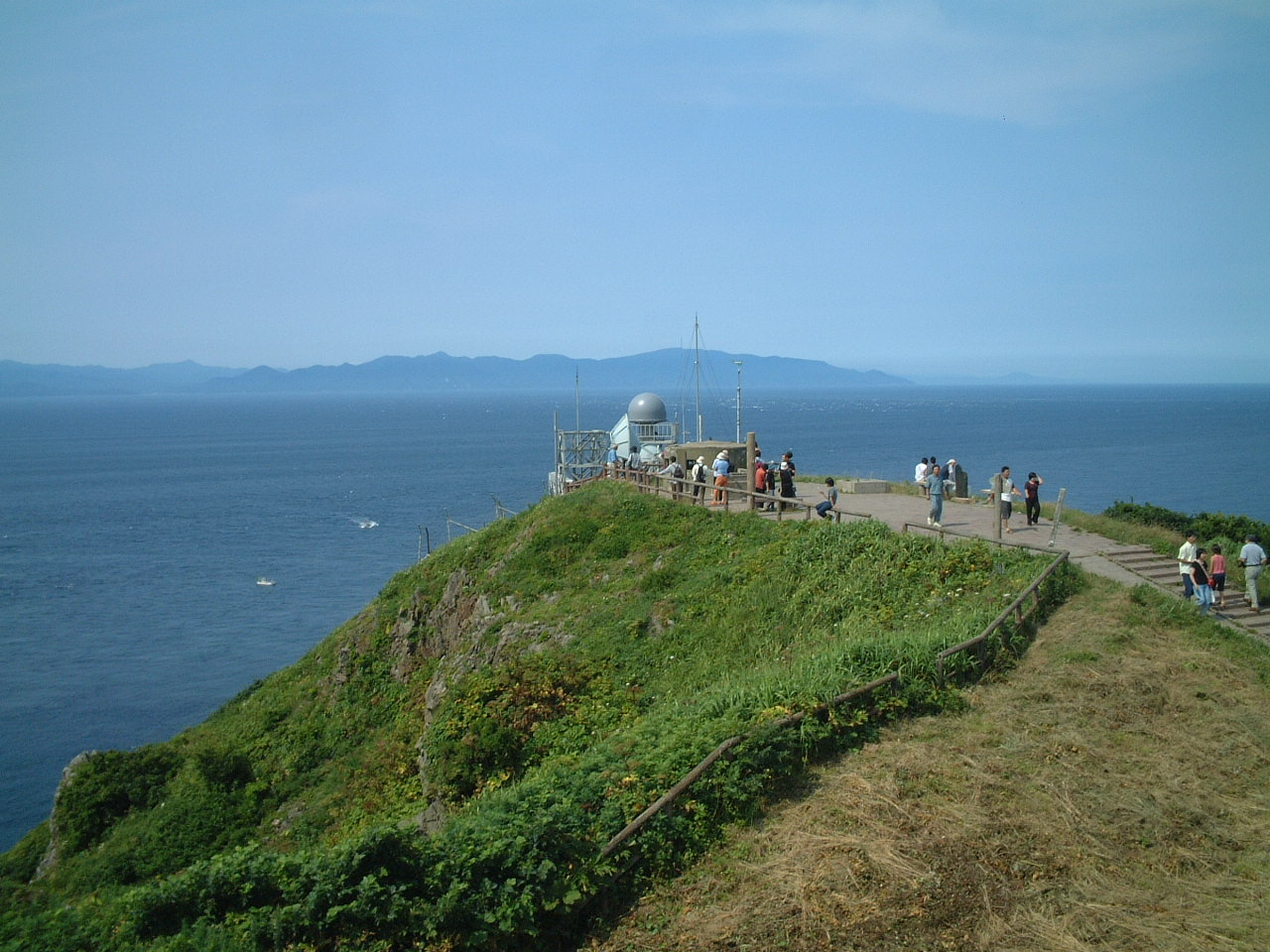
- Cape Tappi with Hokkaido in the distance

- Location of Cape Tappi in Aomori Prefecture Cape Tappi (Japan)
- Coordinates: 41°15′34″N 140°20′34″E
- Location: Sotogahama, Aomori, Japan

Cape Tappi (竜飛崎/龍飛崎, Tappimisaki) is a headland on the northwestern point of the island of Honshu in Japan. The name is believed to be derived from tampa which means "sword's edge" in the Ainu language. It is located on the northern tip of the Tsugaru Peninsula within the borders of the town of Sotogahama in Aomori Prefecture. Much of the cape is also a part of the Tsugaru Quasi-National Park. The cape marks the western limit of the Tsugaru Strait, separating it from the Sea of Japan. The area is known for its almost constant strong winds.

The cape's Tappizaki Lighthouse is listed as one of the “50 Lighthouses of Japan” by the Japan Lighthouse Association. Near the lighthouse are stone monuments commemorating a number of people associated with Aomori Prefecture, including the author Osamu Dazai. On clear days, Matsumae Peninsula in Hokkaido across the Tsugaru Strait can be seen from this location.
