= Tsugaru Peninsula =

Peninsula of Honshu, Japan

Coordinates: 40°57′35″N 140°28′59″E

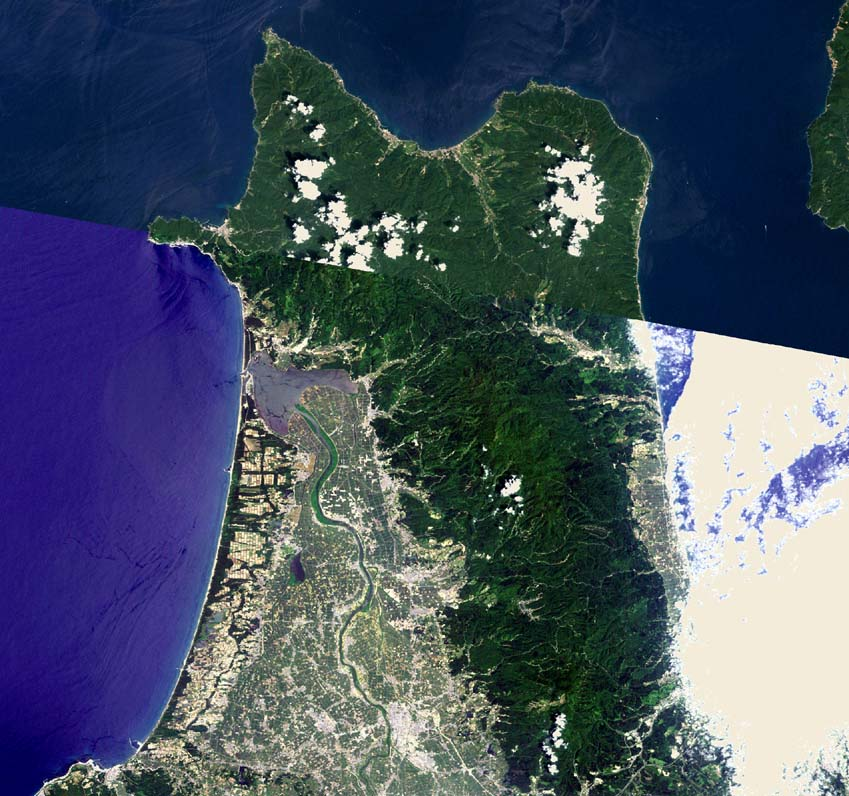
Landsat image of Tsugaru Peninsula

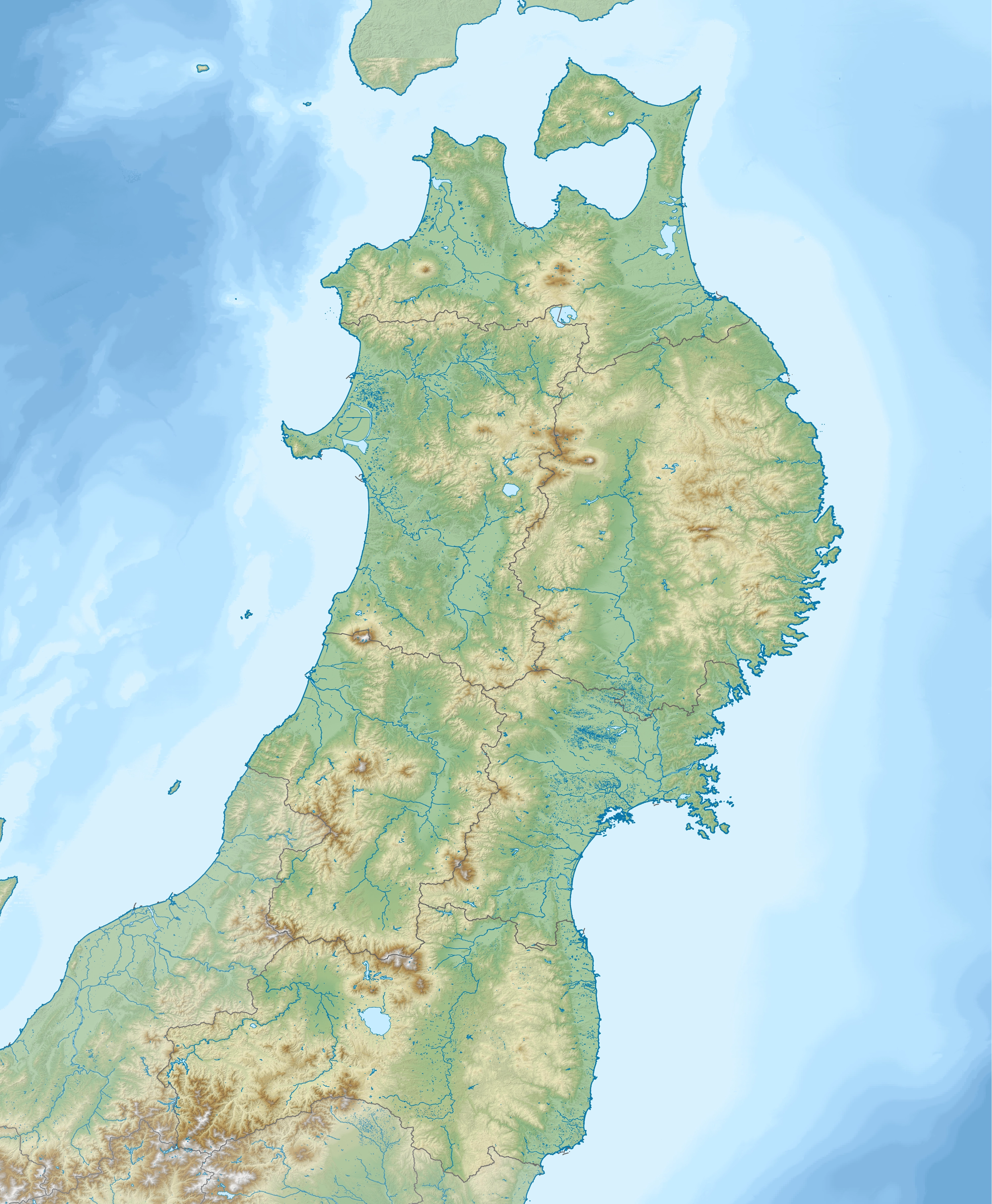
Location

The Tsugaru Peninsula (津軽半島, Tsugaru Hantō) is a peninsula in Aomori Prefecture, at the northern end of Honshū island, Japan. The peninsula projects north into the Tsugaru Strait separating Honshū from Hokkaidō. The western coast is on the Sea of Japan, while on its eastern coast are Aomori Bay and Mutsu Bay. The peninsula is bisected from Cape Tappi at its northern end to the Hakkōda Mountains on its southern end by the Tsugaru Mountains. Across the Tsugaru strait to the north is Hokkaidō's Matsumae Peninsula, to which it is linked by the Seikan Tunnel.

== History ==
In the Edo period, the peninsula was part of the Hirosaki Domain and was ruled by the Tsugaru clan. Traditionally one of the poorest and remotest areas of Japan, Tsugaru is best known as the birthplace of writer Osamu Dazai, who wrote the mordant travelogue Tsugaru about his travels around the peninsula, and for the Tsugaru-jamisen, a distinctive local version of the Japanese string instrument shamisen. After the defeat of Aizu during the Boshin War, many of the last samurai were sent to prisoner-of-war camps on the Tsugaru Peninsula.

== Transportation ==
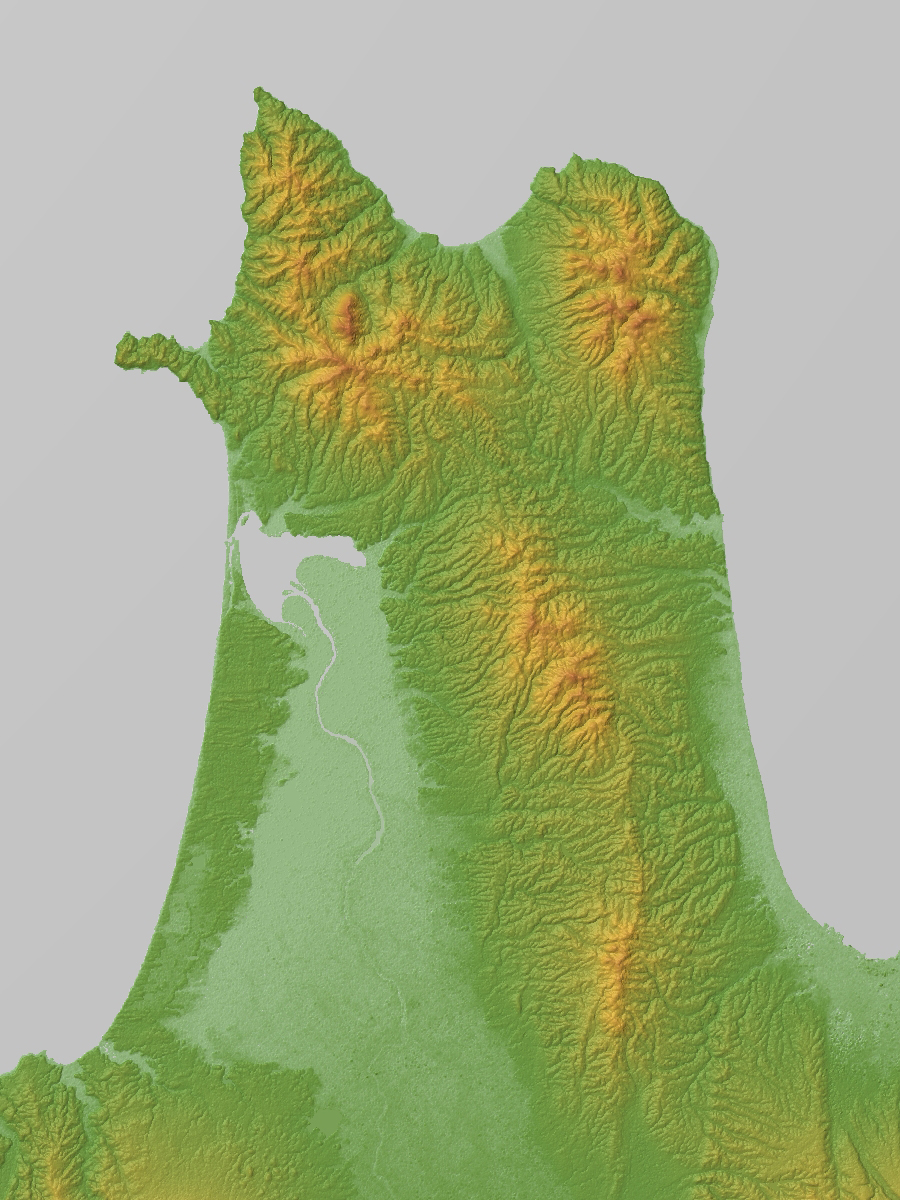
Relief map

=== Rail ===
- Hokkaido Shinkansen, Kaikyō Line, linked to Hokkaidō via the Seikan Tunnel
- Tsugaru Line
- Tsugaru Railway

As with Aizu in Fukushima Prefecture, JR East treats Tsugaru as a separate province from Mutsu, and stations in the area are marked "Tsugaru-" before their names.

=== Highways ===
- Japan National Route 280
- Japan National Route 339

== See also ==
- Folklore of the Tsugaru region
