= Nakasawa Station =

Railway station in Aomori, Aomori Prefecture, Japan

Nakasawa Station 中沢駅
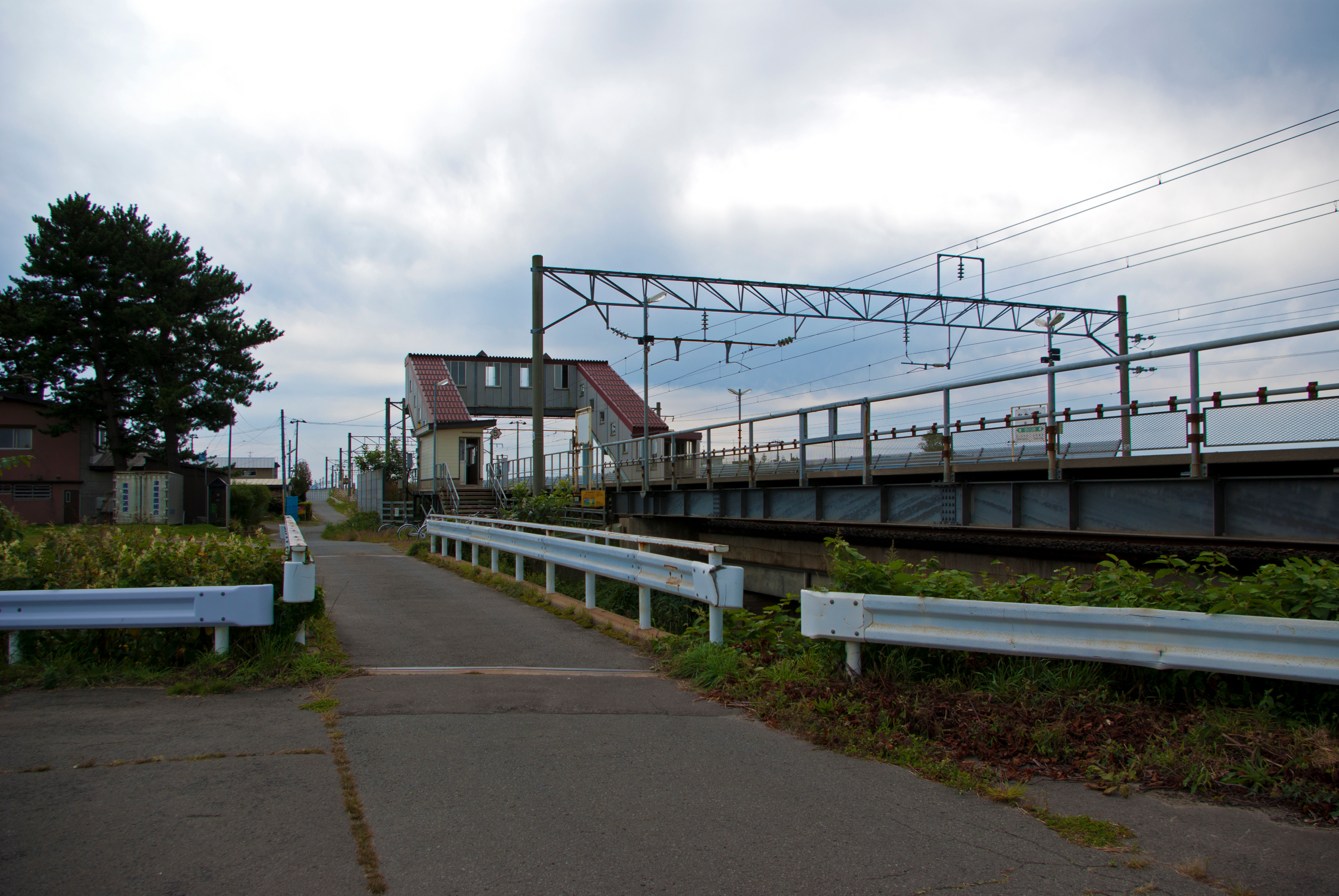
- Nakagawa Station in September 2009

General information
- Location: 729-1 Shitobashi Isono, Aomori-shi, Aomori-ken 030-1261; Japan
- Coordinates: 40°56′58.30″N 140°39′21.80″E
- Operator: JR East
- Line: ■ Tsugaru Line
- Distance: 16.8 km from Aomori
- Platforms: 1 side + 1 island platform

Other information
- Status: Unstaffed
- Website: Official website

History
- Opened: November 25, 1959

Services
Preceding station	JR East	Following station
Yomogita towards Kanita	Tsugaru Line	Ushirogata towards Aomori
Location
- Location within Aomori Prefecture Location within Japan

Nakasawa Station (中沢駅, Nakasawa-eki) is a railway station on the East Japan Railway Company (JR East) Tsugaru Line located in the city of Aomori, Aomori Prefecture, Japan. The station is on the border between the city of Aomori and the town of Yomogita, and “Nakazawa” is a place name within Yomogita.

== Lines ==
Nakasawa Station is served by the Tsugaru Line, and is located 16.8 km (10.4 mi) from the starting point of the line at Aomori.

== Station layout ==
Nakasawa Station has one side platform and one island platform serving three tracks, connected by a footbridge. The station is unattended. There is no station building, but only a weather shelter on Platform 1.

=== Platforms ===
1	■ Tsugaru Line	for Aomori
2	■ Tsugaru Line	(siding)
3	■ Tsugaru Line	for Kanita and Minmaya

Some limited express trains, including Hokutosei, stop at this station without embarkment or disembarkment for siding.

== History ==
Nakasawa Station was opened on November 25, 1959 as a station on the Japanese National Railways (JNR). With the privatization of the JNR on April 1, 1987, it came under the operational control of JR East. A siding track was added in March 1988.

== Surrounding area ==
National Route 280

== See also ==
- List of railway stations in Japan
