= Ōkawadai Station =

Railway station in Imabetsu, Aomori Prefecture, Japan

Ōkawadai Station 大川平駅
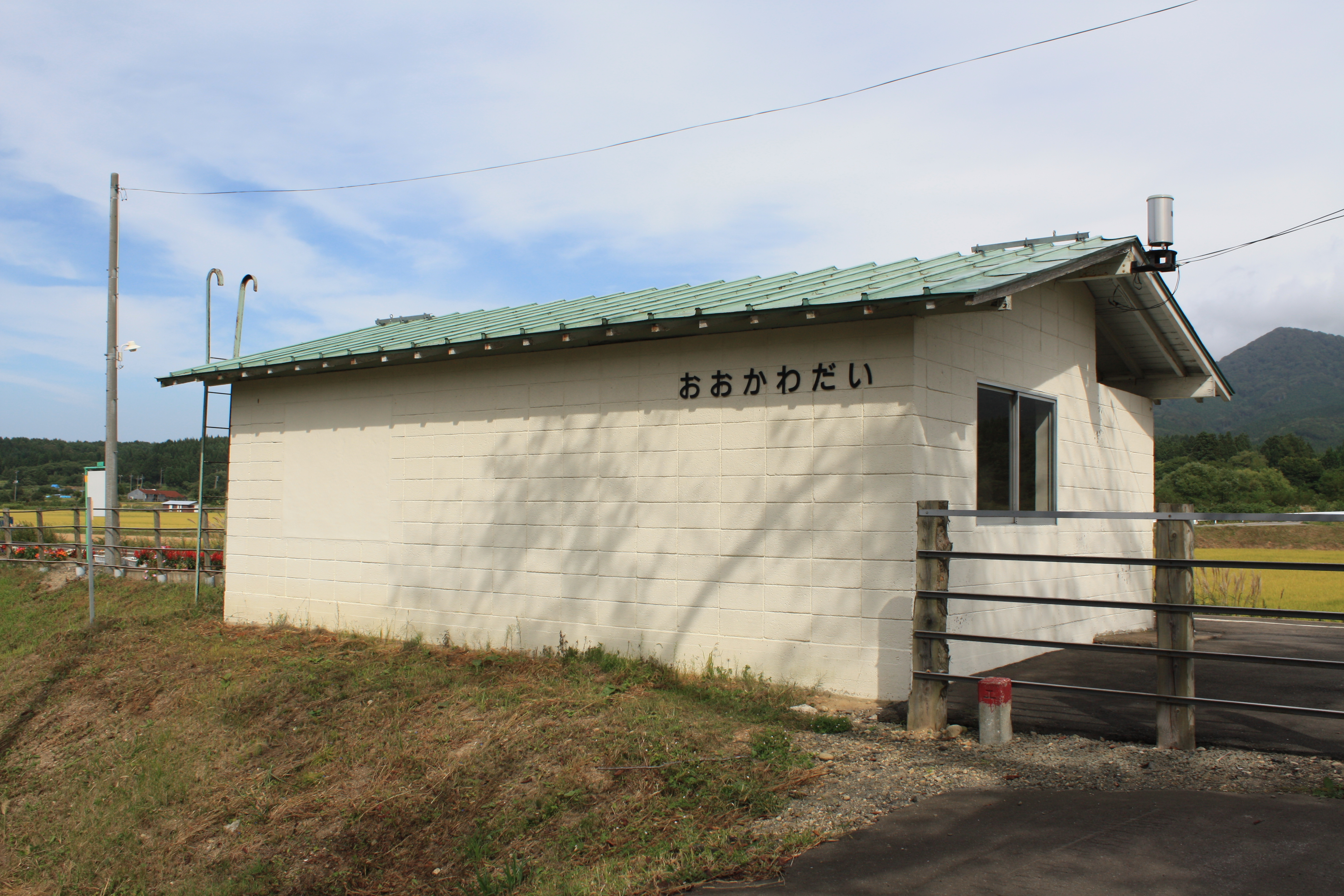
- Ōkawadai Station in September 2008

General information
- Location: 29-4 Ōkawadai Nozawa; Imabetsu, Aomori; Japan
- Coordinates: 41°09′47.42″N 140°30′27.37″E
- Operator: JR East
- Line: Tsugaru Line
- Distance: 48.6 km (30.2 mi) from Aomori
- Platforms: 1 side platform

Other information
- Status: Closed
- Website: Official website

History
- Opened: 21 October 1958; 67 years ago
- Closed: 3 August 2022; 4 years ago

Former services
Preceding station	JR East	Following station
Imabetsu towards Minmaya	Tsugaru Line	Tsugaru-Futamata towards Aomori
Location
- Location within Aomori Prefecture Location within Japan

Ōkawadai Station (Japanese: 大川平駅, Hepburn: Ōkawadai-eki) was a railway station on the JR East Tsugaru Line located in the town of Imabetsu, Aomori Prefecture, Japan.

== Lines ==
Ōkawadai Station was served by the Tsugaru Line, and is located 48.6 kilometres (30.2 mi) from the starting point of the line at Aomori.

== Station layout ==
Ōkawadai Station had one ground-level side platform serving a single bi-directional track. The station was unattended.

== History ==
Ōkawadai Station was opened on October 21, 1958 as a station on the Japanese National Railways (JNR). With the privatization of the JNR on April 1, 1987, it came under the operational control of JR East.

On 3 August 2022, service between Kanita and Minmaya was suspended indefinitely following heavy rainfall and flooding. On 10 June 2025, JR East, Aomori Prefecture, and the two municipalities along the affected section agreed to abolish passenger railway service in April 2027 and replace it with road transportation, including buses and taxis. The replacement services will integrate existing bus and taxi services and add new routes. JR East will contribute more than ¥3 billion to a nonprofit organization established jointly with local governments to operate the replacement transportation for 18 years.

== Surrounding area ==
- Ōkawadai Elementary School

== See also ==
- List of railway stations in Japan
