= Imabetsu Station =

Railway station in Imabetsu, Aomori Prefecture, Japan

Imabetsu Station 今別駅
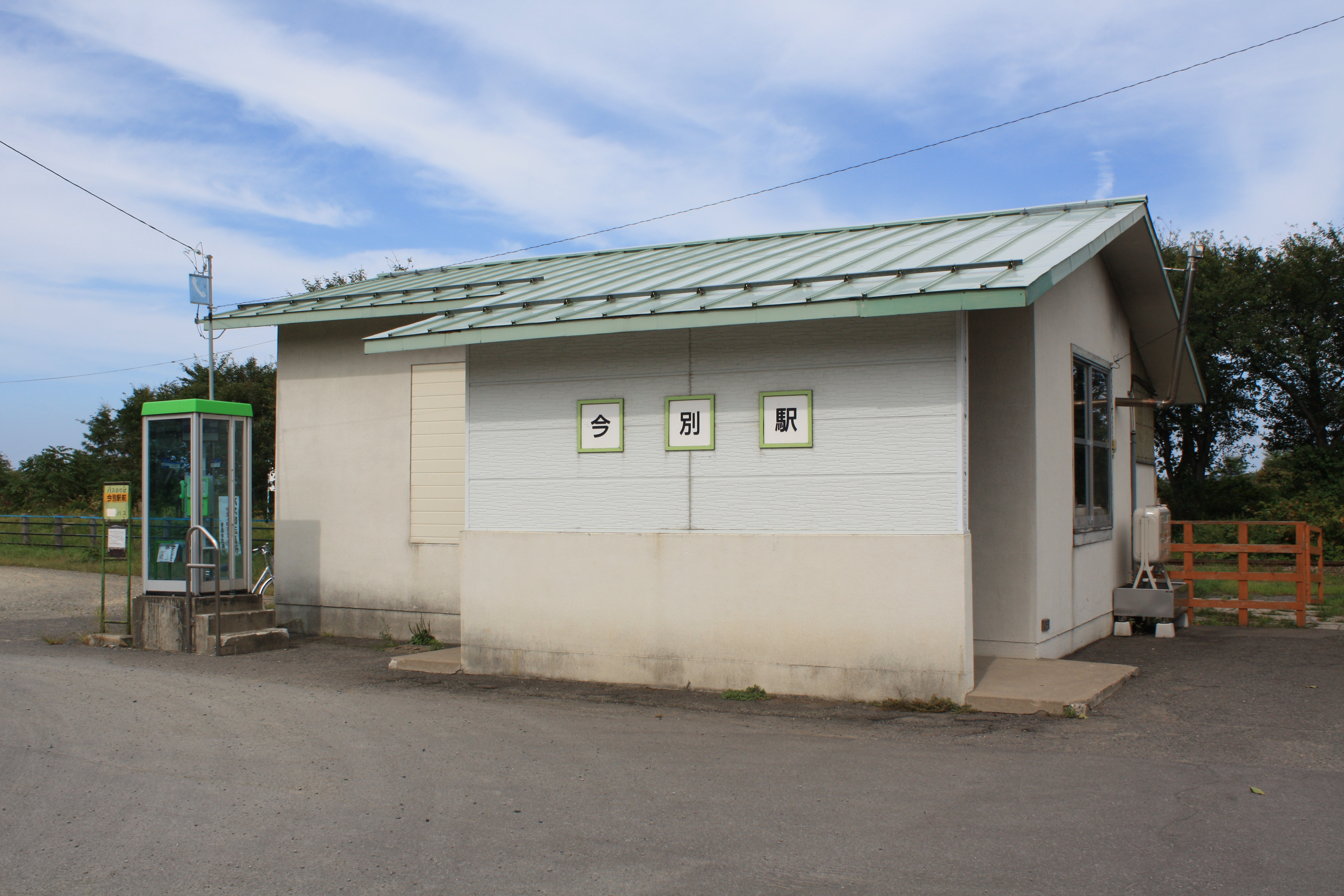
- Imabetsu Station in August 2008

General information
- Location: 37-1 Imabestu Nakazawa; Imabetsu, Aomori; Japan
- Coordinates: 41°10′46.77″N 140°29′26.04″E
- Operator: JR East
- Line: Tsugaru Line
- Distance: 51.0 km (31.7 mi) from Aomori
- Platforms: 1 side platform

Other information
- Status: Closed
- Website: Official website

History
- Opened: 21 October 1958; 67 years ago
- Closed: 3 August 2022; 4 years ago

Former services
Preceding station	JR East	Following station
Tsugaru-Hamana towards Minmaya	Tsugaru Line	Ōkawadai towards Aomori
Location
- Location within Aomori Prefecture Location within Japan

Imabetsu Station (Japanese: 今別駅, Hepburn: Imabetsu-eki) was a railway station on the East Japan Railway Company (JR East) Tsugaru Line located in the town of Imabetsu, Aomori Prefecture, Japan.

== Lines ==
Imabetsu Station was served by the Tsugaru Line, and is located 51.0 kilometres (31.7 mi) from the starting point of the line at Aomori.

== Station layout ==
Imabetsu Station had one ground-level side platform serving a single bi-directional line. The station originally had an island platform, but the northbound portion was closed. The station building consisted of a waiting room only, and was unattended.

== History ==
Imabetsu Station was opened on October 21, 1958 as a station on the Japanese National Railways (JNR). With the privatization of the JNR on April 1, 1987, it came under the operational control of JR East. It has been unattended since July 1, 2003.

On 3 August 2022, service between Kanita and Minmaya was suspended indefinitely following heavy rainfall and flooding. On 10 June 2025, JR East, Aomori Prefecture, and the two municipalities along the affected section agreed to abolish passenger railway service in April 2027 and replace it with road transportation, including buses and taxis. The replacement services will integrate existing bus and taxi services and add new routes. JR East will contribute more than ¥3 billion to a nonprofit organization established jointly with local governments to operate the replacement transportation for 18 years.

== Surrounding area ==
National Route 280

- Imabetsu Town Hall

== See also ==
- List of railway stations in Japan
