= Tsugaru-Futamata Station =

Railway station in Imabetsu, Aomori Prefecture, Japan

Tsugaru-Futamata Station 津軽二股駅
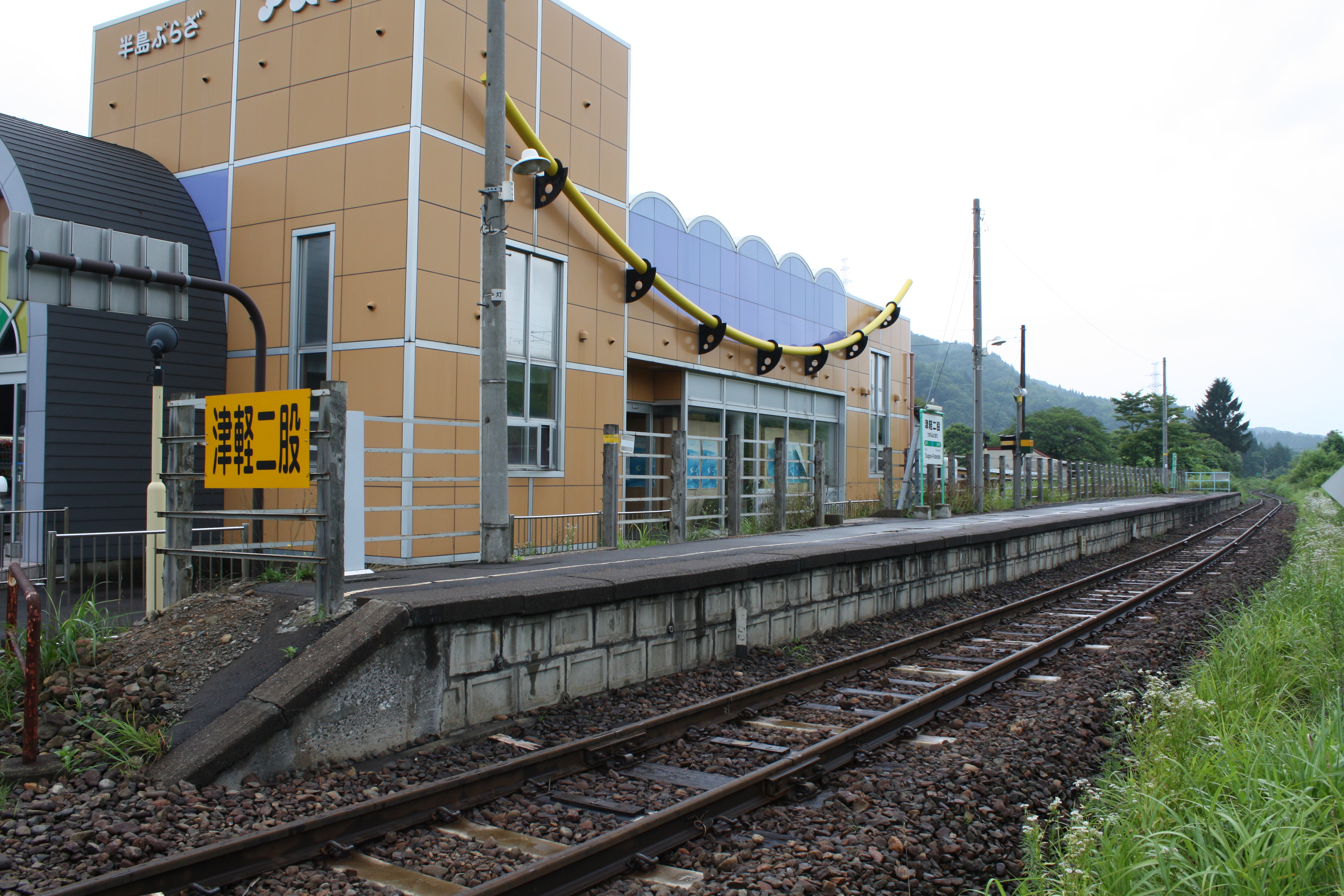
- Tsugaru-Futamata Station in August 2008

General information
- Location: 87-2 Ōkawadai Kiyokawa; Imabetsu, Aomori; Japan
- Coordinates: 41°08′45.25″N 140°30′51.24″E
- Operator: JR East
- Line: Tsugaru Line
- Distance: 46.6 km (29.0 mi) from Aomori
- Platforms: 1 side platform
- Connections: Hokkaido Shinkansen (Okutsugaru-Imabetsu)

Other information
- Status: Closed
- Website: Official website

History
- Opened: 21 October 1958; 67 years ago
- Closed: 3 August 2022; 4 years ago

Former services
Preceding station	JR East	Following station
Ōkawadai towards Minmaya	Tsugaru Line	Ōdai towards Aomori
Location
- Location within Aomori Prefecture Location within Japan

Tsugaru-Futamata Station (Japanese: 津軽二股駅, Hepburn: Tsugaru-Futamata-eki) was a railway station on the East Japan Railway Company (JR East) Tsugaru Line located in the town of Imabetsu, Aomori Prefecture, Japan.

== Lines ==
Tsugaru-Futamata Station was served by the Tsugaru Line, and is located 46.6 kilometres (29.0 mi) from the starting point of the line at Aomori.

== Station layout ==
Tsugaru-Futamata Station had one side platform serving a single bi-directional track. The station was unattended. The station building also doubled as Michi-no-eki Imabetsu serving vehicular traffic.

== History ==
Tsugaru-Futamata Station was opened on October 21, 1958, as a station on the Japanese National Railways (JNR). Scheduled freight operations were discontinued from October 20, 1968. With the privatization of the JNR on April 1, 1987, it came under the operational control of JR East.

On 3 August 2022, service between Kanita and Minmaya was suspended indefinitely following heavy rainfall and flooding. On 10 June 2025, JR East, Aomori Prefecture, and the two municipalities along the affected section agreed to abolish passenger railway service in April 2027 and replace it with road transportation, including buses and taxis. The replacement services will integrate existing bus and taxi services and add new routes. JR East will contribute more than ¥3 billion to a nonprofit organization established jointly with local governments to operate the replacement transportation for 18 years.

== Surrounding area ==
The station was next to the Okutsugaru-Imabetsu Station of the Hokkaido Shinkansen (which runs immediately adjacent and parallel to Tsugaru-Futamata). Prior to the opening of Okutsugaru-Imabetsu Station, there was the Tsugaru-Imabetsu Station on the Kaikyō Line at the same location, which was connected by a stairway.

== See also ==
- List of railway stations in Japan
