= Ōdai Station =

Railway station in Sotogahama, Aomori Prefecture, Japan

Ōdai Station 大平駅
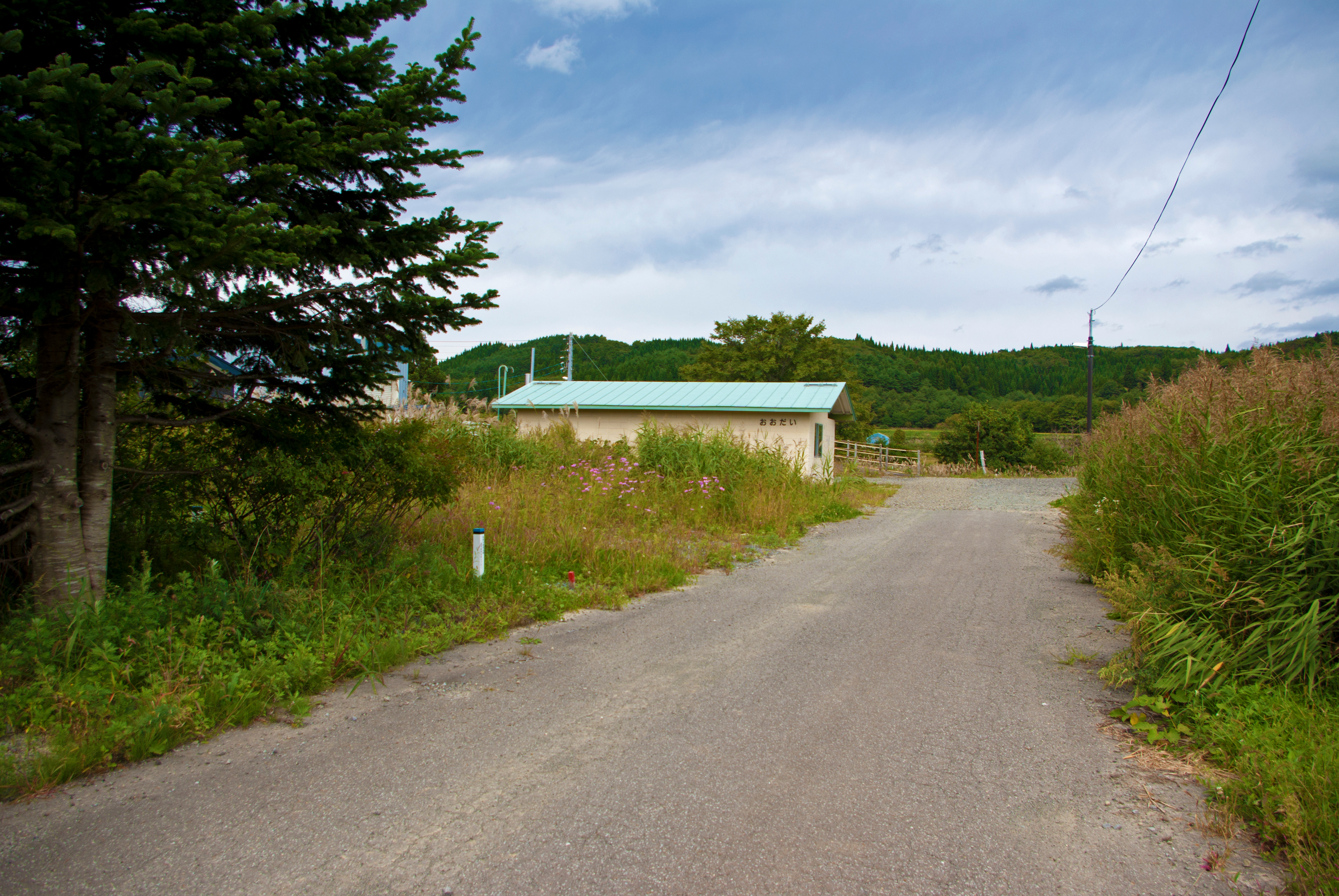
- Ōdai Station in September 2009

General information
- Location: Kanita Ōdai Yamamoto; Sotogahama, Aomori; Japan
- Coordinates: 41°03′57.12″N 140°33′33.75″E
- Operator: JR East
- Line: Tsugaru Line
- Distance: 35.0 km (21.7 mi) from Aomori
- Platforms: 1 side platform
- Tracks: 1

Other information
- Status: Closed
- Website: Official website

History
- Opened: 21 October 1958; 67 years ago
- Closed: 3 August 2022; 4 years ago

Former services
Preceding station	JR East	Following station
Tsugaru-Futamata towards Minmaya	Tsugaru Line	Naka-Oguni towards Aomori
Location
- Location within Aomori Prefecture Location within Japan

Ōdai Station (Japanese: 大平駅, Hepburn: Ōdai-eki) was a railway station on the East Japan Railway Company (JR East) Tsugaru Line located in the town of Sotogahama, Aomori Prefecture, Japan.

== Lines ==
Ōdai Station was served by the Tsugaru Line, and is located 35.0 kilometres (21.7 mi) from the starting point of the line at Aomori.

== Station layout ==
Ōdai Station had one ground-level side platform serving a single bidirectional track. The station was unattended.

== History ==
Ōdai Station was opened on October 21, 1958, as a station on the Japanese National Railways (JNR). With the privatization of the JNR on April 1, 1987, it came under the operational control of JR East.

On 3 August 2022, service between Kanita and Minmaya was suspended indefinitely following heavy rainfall and flooding. On 10 June 2025, JR East, Aomori Prefecture, and the two municipalities along the affected section agreed to abolish passenger railway service in April 2027 and replace it with road transportation, including buses and taxis. The replacement services will integrate existing bus and taxi services and add new routes. JR East will contribute more than ¥3 billion to a nonprofit organization established jointly with local governments to operate the replacement transportation for 18 years.

== Surrounding area ==
- Aomori Prefectural Route 12

== See also ==
- List of railway stations in Japan
