= Gōsawa Station =

Railway station in Yomogita, Aomori Prefecture, Japan

Gōsawa Station 郷沢駅
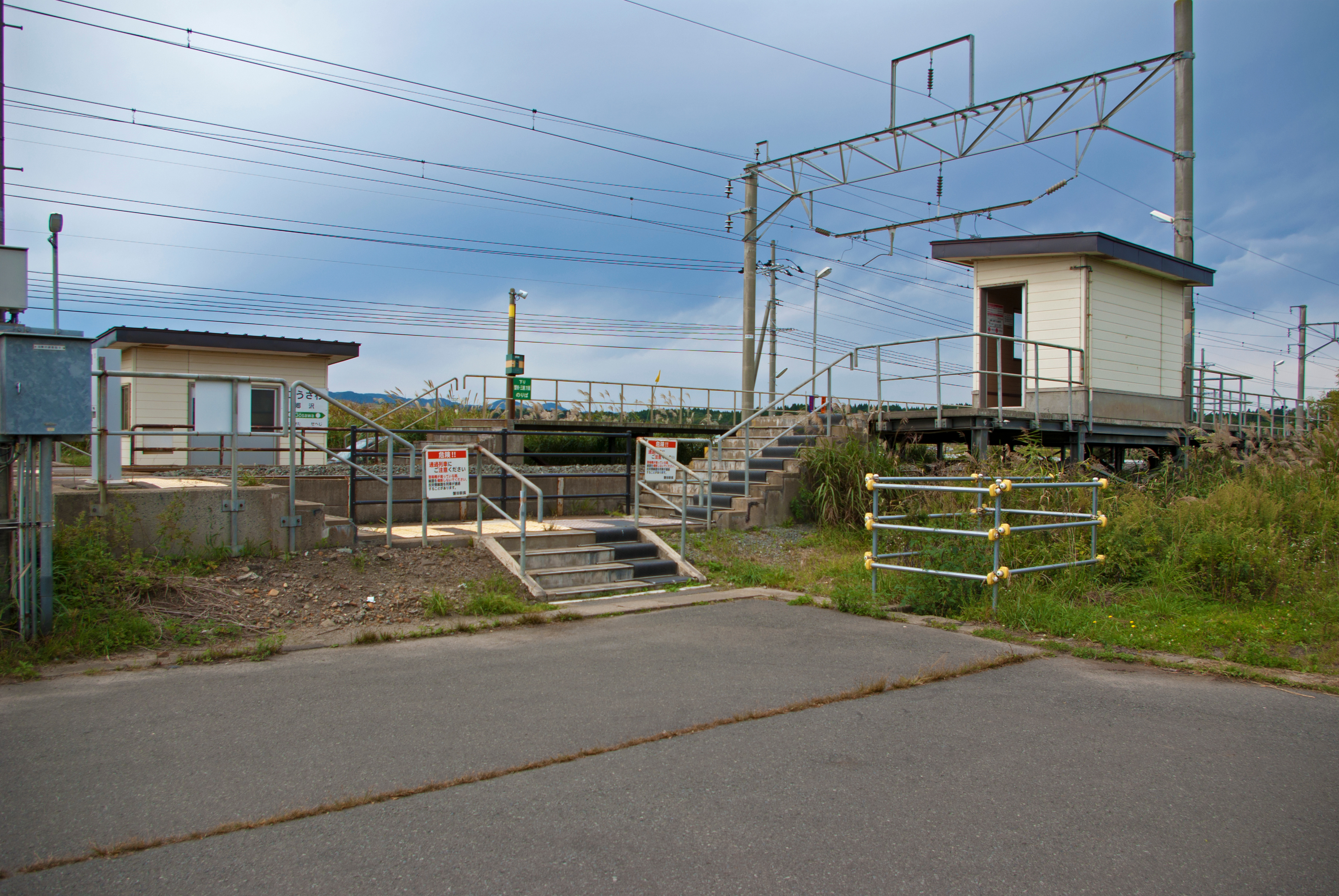
- Gosawa Station in September 2009

General information
- Location: 138-40 Gōsawa Hamada, Yomogita-mura, Higashitsugaru-gun, Aomori-ken 030-1203; Japan
- Coordinates: 40°59′15.42″N 140°39′08.71″E
- Operator: JR East
- Line: ■ Tsugaru Line
- Distance: 21.1 km from Aomori
- Platforms: 2 side platforms

Other information
- Status: Unstaffed
- Website: Official website

History
- Opened: November 25, 1959

Services
Preceding station	JR East	Following station
Seheji towards Minmaya	Tsugaru Line	Yomogita towards Aomori
Location
- Location within Aomori Prefecture Location within Japan

Gōsawa Station (郷沢駅, Gōsawa-eki) is a railway station on the JR East Tsugaru Line located in the village of Yomogita, Aomori Prefecture, Japan.

== Lines ==
Gōsawa Station is served by the Tsugaru Line, and is located 21.1 km from the starting point of the line at Aomori.

== Station layout ==
Gōsawa Station has two opposed ground-level side platforms connected by a level crossing. The station is unattended.

=== Platforms ===
1	■ Tsugaru Line	for Aomori
2	■ Tsugaru Line	for Kanita and Minmaya

== History ==
Gōsawa Station was opened on November 25, 1959 as a station on the Japanese National Railways (JNR). With the privatization of the JNR on April 1, 1987, it came under the operational control of JR East.

== Surrounding area ==
National Route 280

== See also ==
- List of railway stations in Japan
