= Naka-Oguni Station =

Closed Railway station in Sotogahama, Aomori Prefecture, Japan

Naka-Oguni Station 中小国駅
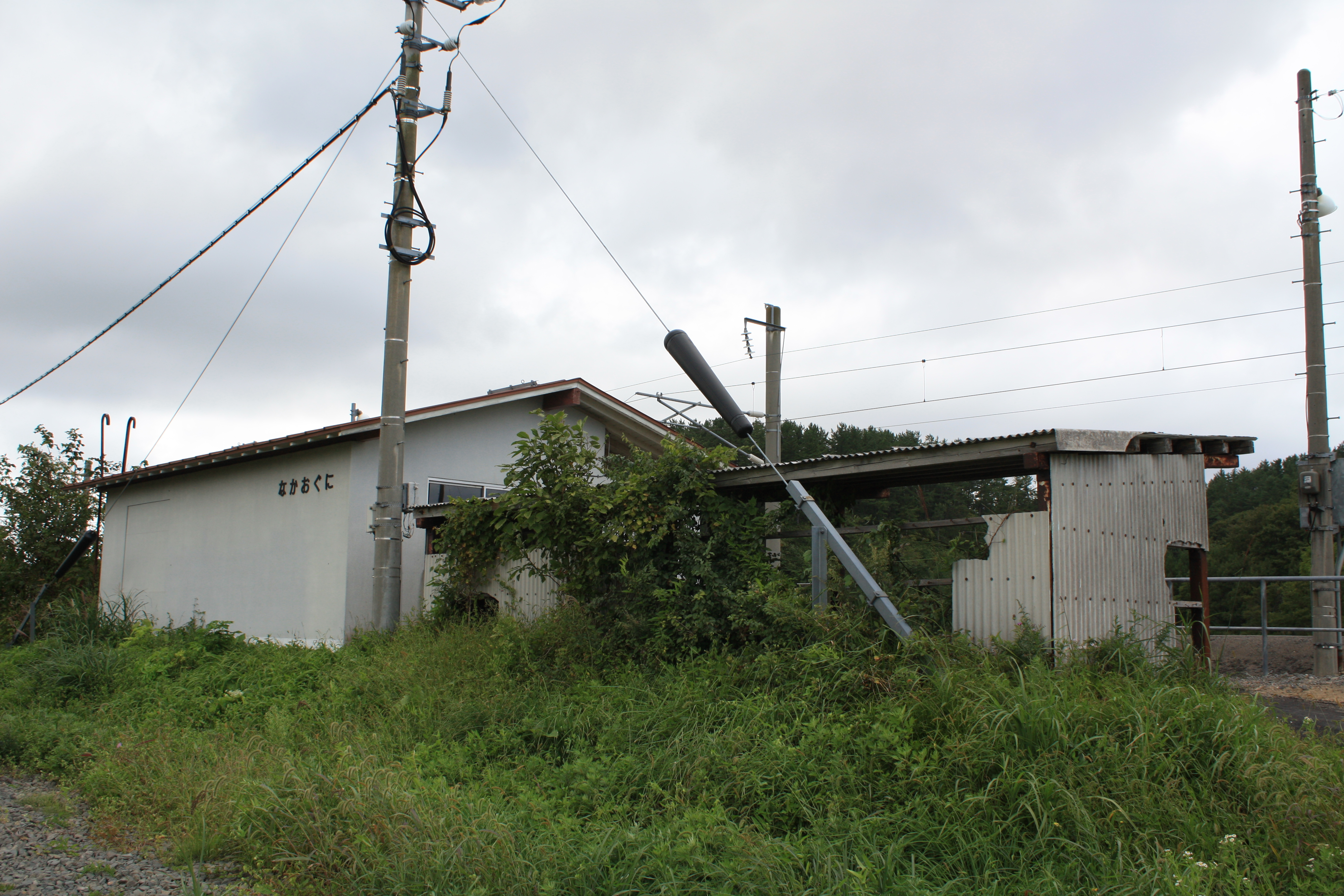
- Naka-Oguni Station in September 2008

General information
- Location: Kanita Oguni Minamida; Sotogahama, Aomori; Japan
- Coordinates: 41°03′08″N 140°35′46″E
- Operator: JR East
- Line: Tsugaru Line
- Distance: 31.4 km (19.5 mi) from Aomori
- Platforms: 1 side platform

Construction
- Structure type: At-grade

Other information
- Status: Closed
- Website: Official website

History
- Opened: 21 October 1958; 67 years ago
- Closed: 3 August 2022; 4 years ago

Former services
Preceding station	JR East	Following station
Ōdai towards Minmaya	Tsugaru Line (2016–2022)	Kanita towards Aomori
through to JR Hokkaido	Tsugaru-Kaikyo Line	Kanita towards Aomori
Preceding station	JR Hokkaido	Following station
Tsugaru-Imabetsu towards Hakodate	Tsugaru-Kaikyo Line	through to JR East Line
Tsugaru-Imabetsu towards Kikonai	Kaikyo Line	Terminus
Location
- Location within Aomori Prefecture Location within Japan

Naka-Oguni Station (Japanese: 中小国駅, Hepburn: Naka-Oguni-eki) is a railway station on the Tsugaru Line in the town of Sotogahama, Aomori, Japan, operated by East Japan Railway Company (JR East).

== Lines ==
Naka-Oguni Station is served by the JR East Tsugaru Line and is 31.4 km (19.5 mi) from the southern terminus of the line at Aomori Station.

== Station layout ==
Naka-Oguni Station has one side platform serving a single bidirectional track. The station is unattended.

== History ==
The station opened on 21 October 1958, as a station on the Japanese National Railways (JNR). With the privatization of JNR on 1 April 1987, it came under the operational control of JR East. With the opening of the Tsugaru Kaikyō Line on 13 March 1988, operation of the station was shared between JR East and JR Hokkaido, and the station was regarded as the southern starting point of the Tsugaru Kaikyō Line for the determination of railway fares, although no trains of Kaikyō Line stopped at the station, and the effective southern terminus for all Tsugaru Kaikyō Line trains was at Aomori Station.

Services on the Tsugaru Kaikyō ceased on 26 March 2016 when the Hokkaido Shinkansen opened and replaced regular passenger services connecting Aomori and Hakodate.

On 3 August 2022, service between Kanita and Minmaya was suspended indefinitely following heavy rainfall and flooding. On 10 June 2025, JR East, Aomori Prefecture, and the two municipalities along the affected section agreed to abolish passenger railway service in April 2027 and replace it with road transportation, including buses and taxis. The replacement services will integrate existing bus and taxi services and add new routes. JR East will contribute more than ¥3 billion to a nonprofit organization established jointly with local governments to operate the replacement transportation for 18 years.

== Shin‑Naka‑Oguni Signal Station ==
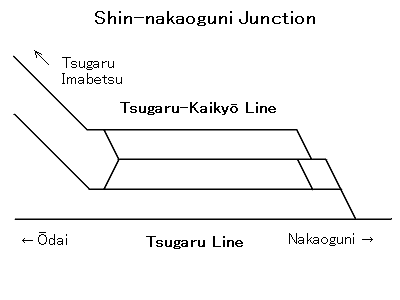
Shinnakaoguni Junction

Shin‑Naka‑Oguni Signal Station (新中小国信号場, Shin-Naka-Oguni Shingōjō)[ja] (2.3 km (1.4 mi) north of Naka-Oguni Station) is the junction of the Tsugaru Line and the Kaikyō Line.

Up to this point the two lines share the same track from Aomori Station. The junction also marks the border between the electrified portion of the Tsugaru Line (Aomori to Naka-Oguni) and the non-electrified portion (Naka-Oguni to Minmaya), as well as the border between JR East and JR Hokkaido. Approximately 1.4 km (0.87 mi) north of Shin‑Naka‑Oguni Signal Station the Kaikyō Line curves to the right, with the outbound track passing underneath both Hokkaido Shinkansen tracks before merging with it and entering the Ohira Tunnel (大平トンネル, Ōhira Tonneru).

== See also ==
- List of railway stations in Japan
