= Ushirogata Station =

Railway station in Aomori, Aomori Prefecture, Japan

Ushirogata Station 後潟駅
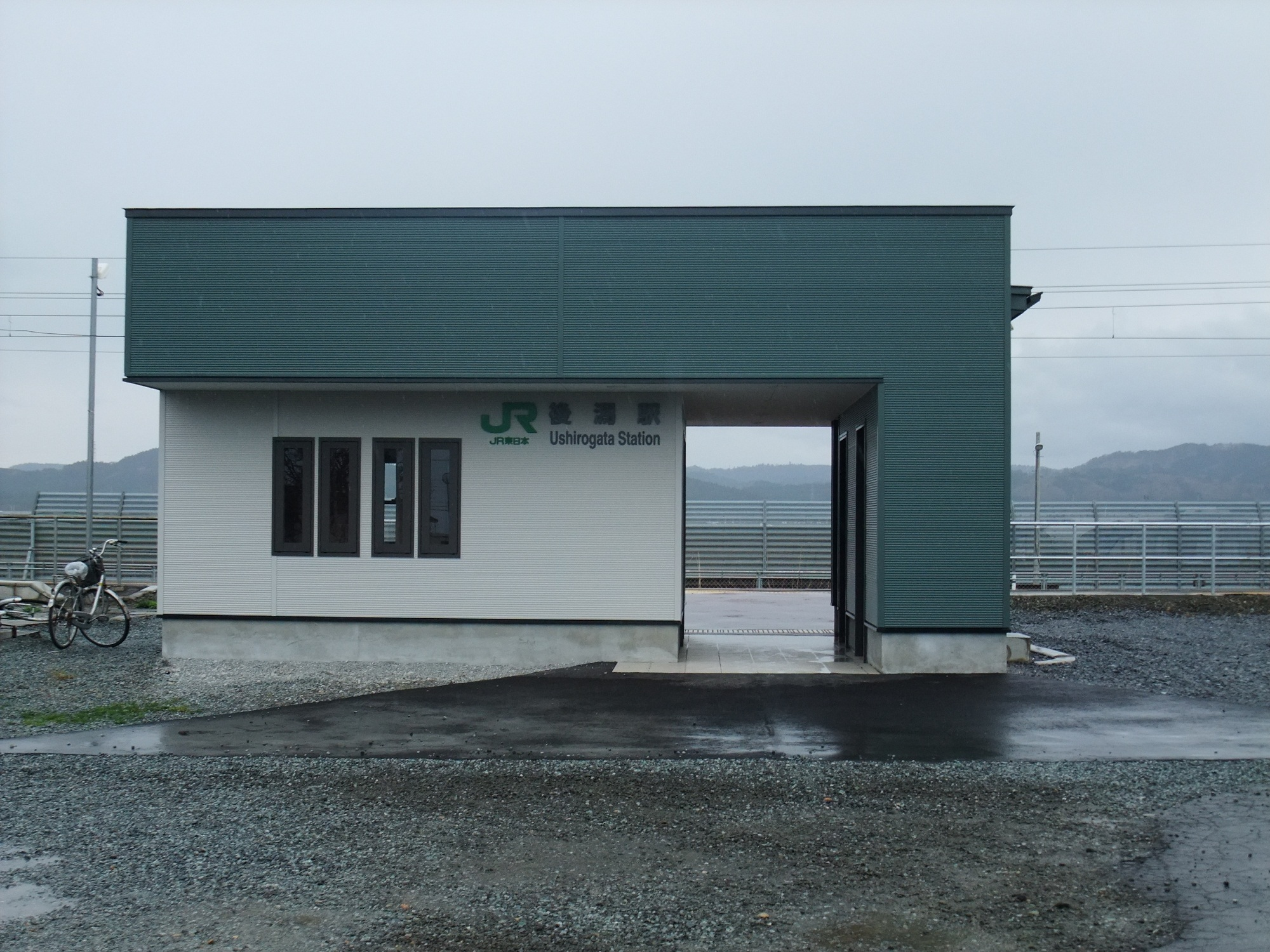
- Ushirogata Station in May 2013

General information
- Location: Rokumaibashi, Aomori-shi, Aomori-ken 030-1271; Japan
- Coordinates: 40°55′53.47″N 140°39′45.84″E
- Operator: JR East
- Line: ■ Tsugaru Line
- Distance: 14.7 km from Aomori
- Platforms: 1 side platform

Other information
- Status: Unstaffed
- Website: Official website

History
- Opened: December 5, 1951

Services
| Preceding station | JR East | Following station |
|---|---|---|
| Nakasawa towards Kanita | Tsugaru Line | Hidariseki towards Aomori |
Location
- Location within Aomori Prefecture Location within Japan

Ushirogata Station (後潟駅, Ushirogata-eki) is a railway station on the East Japan Railway Company (JR East) Tsugaru Line located in the city of Aomori, Aomori Prefecture, Japan.

== Lines ==
Ushirogata Station is served by the Tsugaru Line, and is located 14.7 kilometres (9.1 mi) from the starting point of the line at Aomori.

== Station layout ==
Ushirogata Station has one side platform serving a single bi-directional traffic. The station is unattended. The short platform requires that trains longer than five carriages use a door cut system.

== History ==
Ushirogata Station was opened on December 5, 1951, as a station on the Japanese National Railways (JNR). Scheduled freight operations were discontinued from October 1968. On April 1, 1970, it became a kan'i itaku station, operated by the Japan Travel Bureau. With the privatization of the JNR on April 1, 1987, it came under the operational control of JR East. It has been unattended since September 2009.

== Route bus ==
- Ushirogata-Jidokan-mae bus stop
  - Aomori municipal Bus
    - For.Ushirogata
    - For.Furukawa via Okunai and Jyusannmori (Aburakawa)

== Surrounding area ==
National Route 280

- Aomori city hall Ushirogata branch
- Ushirogata Post Office
- Ushirogata Elementary School

== See also ==
- List of railway stations in Japan
