= Okunai Station =

Railway station in Aomori, Aomori Prefecture, Japan

Okunai Station 奥内駅
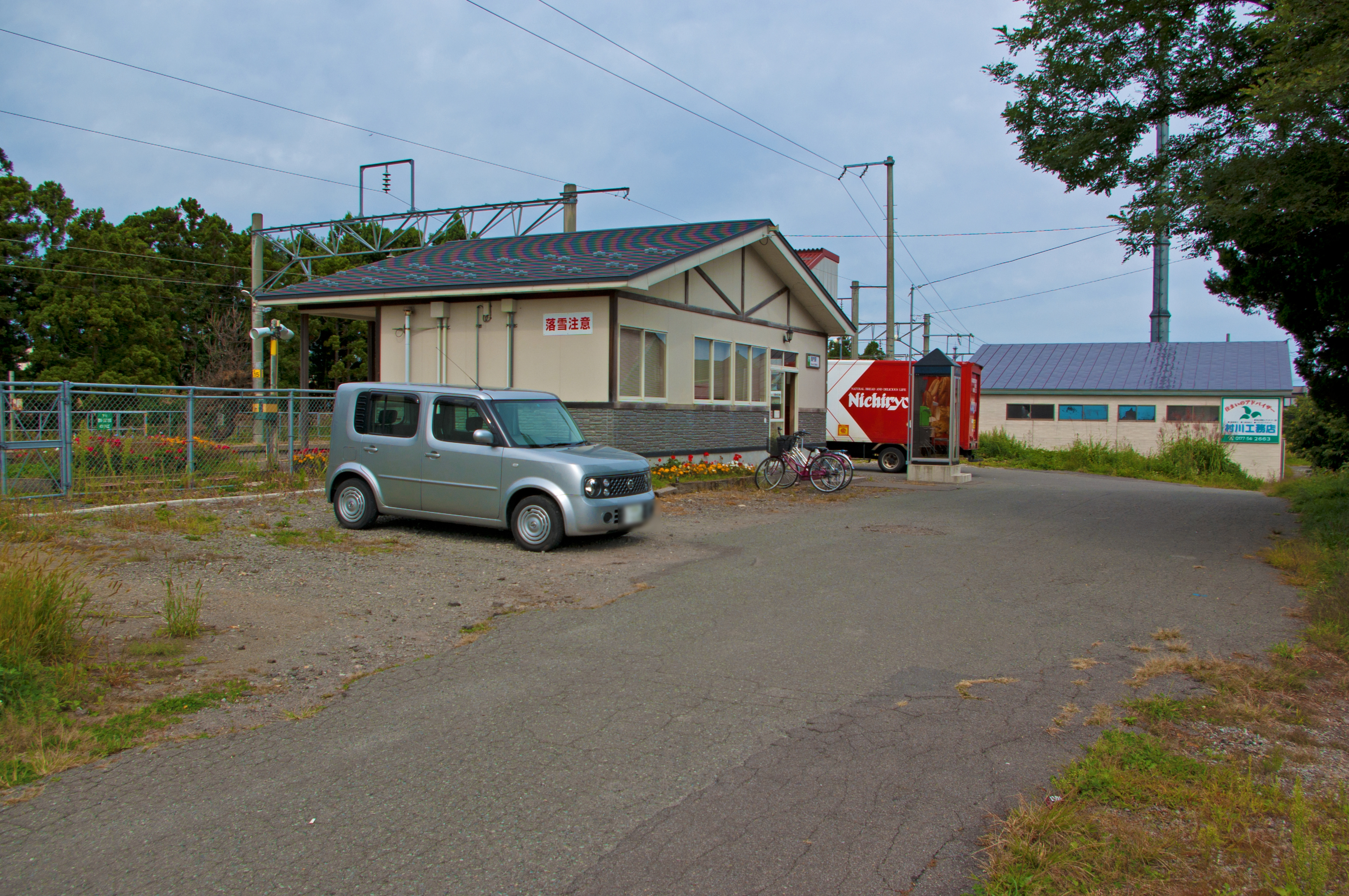
- Okunai Station In September 2009

General information
- Location: 153 Shimizu Yamamoto, Aomori-shi, Aomori-ken 038-0052; Japan
- Coordinates: 40°54′11.13″N 140°40′20.47″E
- Operator: JR East
- Line: ■ Tsugaru Line
- Distance: 11.5 km from Aomori
- Platforms: 2 side platforms

Other information
- Status: staffed
- Website: Official website

History
- Opened: December 5, 1951

Services
Preceding station	JR East	Following station
Hidariseki towards Kanita	Tsugaru Line	Tsugaru-Miyata towards Aomori
Location
- Location within Aomori Prefecture Location within Japan

Okunai Station (奥内駅, Okunai-eki) is a railway station on the East Japan Railway Company (JR East) Tsugaru Line located in the city of Aomori, Aomori Prefecture, Japan.

== Lines ==
Okunai Station is served by the Tsugaru Line, and is located 11.5 km from the starting point of the line at Aomori.

== Station layout ==
Okunai Station has a dual opposed side platforms serving two tracks. The platforms are short, and a door cut system is used for trains longer than 5 carriages long. The station is unattended.

=== Platforms ===
1	■ Tsugaru Line	for Aomori
2	■ Tsugaru Line	for Kanita

== History ==
Okunai Station was opened on December 5, 1951 as a station on the Japanese National Railways (JNR). It became unattended from 1961–1987. In 1968, freight operations were suspended. With the privatization of the JNR on April 1, 1987, it came under the operational control of JR East. The station building burned down in a fire in November 1999 and the present building was completed in March 2000. The station has been unattended again since 2001.

== Route bus ==
- Okunai-eki-mae bus stop
  - Aomori municipal Bus
    - For.Ushirogata via Hidariseki
    - For.Furukawa via Jyusannmori(Aburakawa) and Okidate

== Surrounding area ==
- Kita Junior High School
- Okunai Elementary School

== See also ==
- List of railway stations in Japan
