= Tsugaru-Hamana Station =

Railway station in Imabetsu, Aomori Prefecture, Japan

Tsugaru-Hamana Station 津軽浜名駅
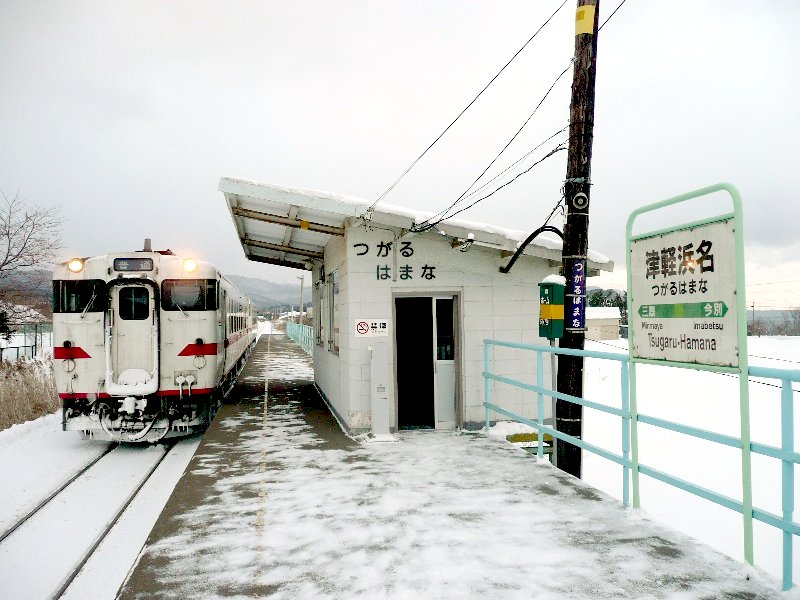
- Tsugaru-Hamana Station in January 2008

General information
- Location: 370 Imabestu Nishida; Imabetsu, Aomori; Japan
- Coordinates: 41°10′49.95″N 140°28′18.45″E
- Operator: JR East
- Line: Tsugaru Line
- Distance: 52.7 km (32.7 mi) from Aomori
- Platforms: 1 side platform

Other information
- Status: Closed
- Website: Official website

History
- Opened: December 10, 1960

Former services
Preceding station	JR East	Following station
Minmaya Terminus	Tsugaru Line	Imabetsu towards Aomori
Location
- Location within Aomori Prefecture Location within Japan

Tsugaru-Hamana Station (Japanese: 津軽浜名駅, Hepburn: Tsugaru-Hamana-eki) was a railway station on the East Japan Railway Company (JR East) Tsugaru Line located in the town of Imabetsu, Aomori Prefecture, Japan. It is the closest station to the Honshu portal of the Seikan Tunnel.

== Lines ==
Tsugaru-Hamana Station was served by the Tsugaru Line, and is located 52.7 kilometres (32.7 mi) from the starting point of the line at Aomori.

== Station layout ==
Tsugaru-Hamana Station had one ground-level side platform serving a single bi-directional track. The station was unattended.

== History ==
Tsugaru-Hamana Station was opened on December 10, 1960 as a station on the Japanese National Railways (JNR). With the privatization of the JNR on April 1, 1987, it came under the operational control of JR East.

On 3 August 2022, service between Kanita and Minmaya was suspended indefinitely following heavy rainfall and flooding. On 10 June 2025, JR East, Aomori Prefecture, and the two municipalities along the affected section agreed to abolish passenger railway service in April 2027 and replace it with road transportation, including buses and taxis. The replacement services will integrate existing bus and taxi services and add new routes. JR East will contribute more than ¥3 billion to a nonprofit organization established jointly with local governments to operate the replacement transportation for 18 years.

== Surrounding area ==
National Route 280

== See also ==
- List of railway stations in Japan
