= Tsugaru-Miyata Station =

Railway station in Aomori, Aomori Prefecture, Japan

Tsugaru-Miyata Station 津軽宮田駅
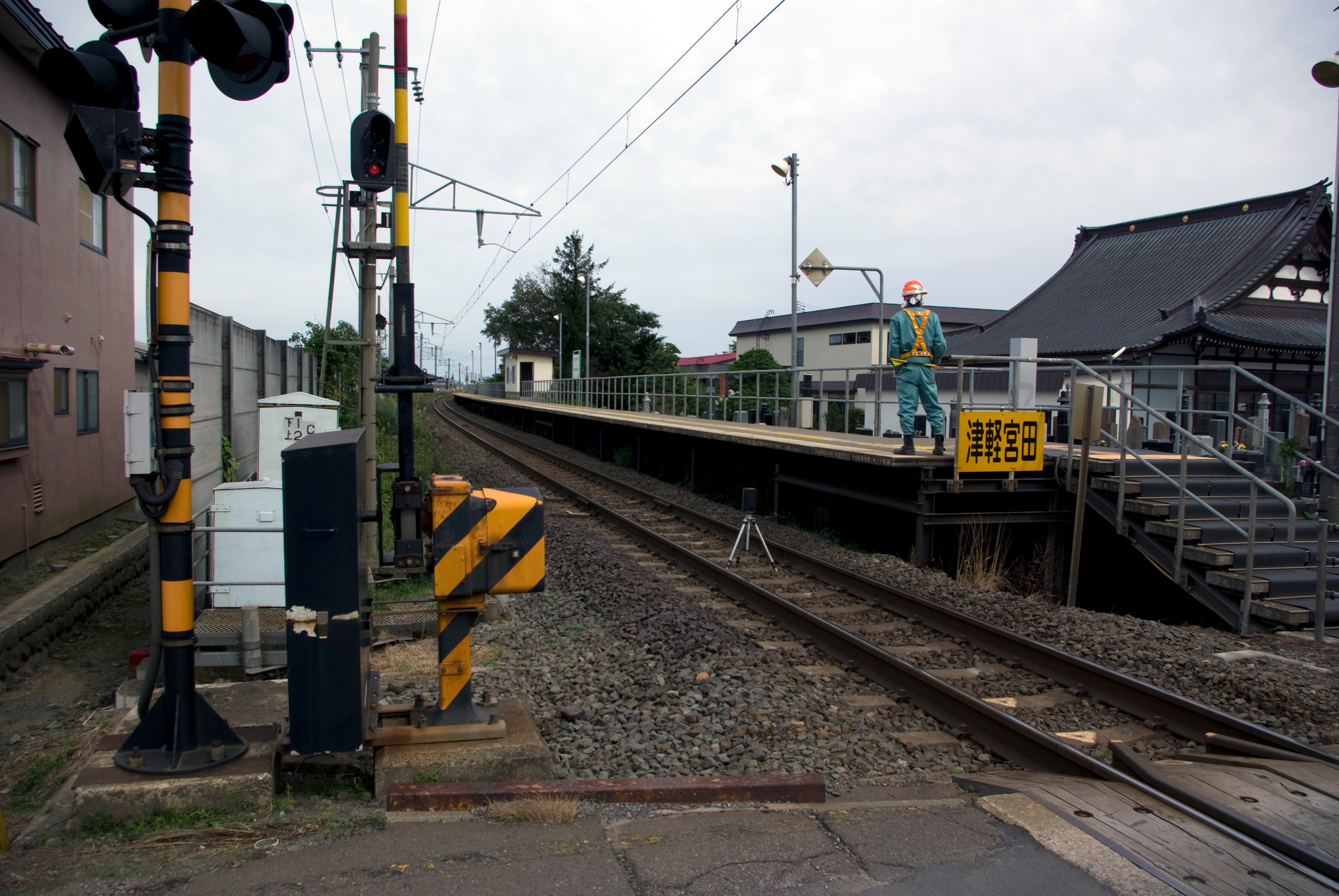
- Tsugaru-Miyata Station in September 2009

General information
- Location: 37 Okunai Tomita 37, Aomori-shi, Aomori-ken 038-0054; Japan
- Coordinates: 40°53′13.83″N 140°40′28.24″E
- Operator: JR East
- Line: ■ Tsugaru Line
- Distance: 9.7 km from Aomori
- Platforms: 1 side platform

Other information
- Status: Unstaffed
- Website: Official website

History
- Opened: November 25, 1959

Services
Preceding station	JR East	Following station
Okunai towards Kanita	Tsugaru Line	Aburakawa towards Aomori
Location
- Location within Aomori Prefecture Location within Japan

Tsugaru-Miyata Station (津軽宮田駅, Tsugaru-Miyata-eki) is a railway station on the East Japan Railway Company (JR East) Tsugaru Line located in the city of Aomori, Aomori Prefecture, Japan.

== Lines ==
Tsugaru-Miyata Station is served by the Tsugaru Line, and is located 9.7 km from the starting point of the line at Aomori.

== Station layout ==
Tsugaru-Miyata Station has a single side platform serving bidirectional traffic. The station is unattended. It has no station building, but only a small weather shelter on the platform.

== History ==
Tsugaru-Miyata Station was opened on November 25, 1959 as a station on the Japanese National Railways (JNR). With the privatization of the JNR on April 1, 1987, it came under the operational control of JR East.

== Surrounding area ==
- Aomori city government Okunai office

== See also ==
- List of railway stations in Japan
