= Seheji Station =

Railway station in Yomogita, Aomori Prefecture, Japan

Seheji Station 瀬辺地駅
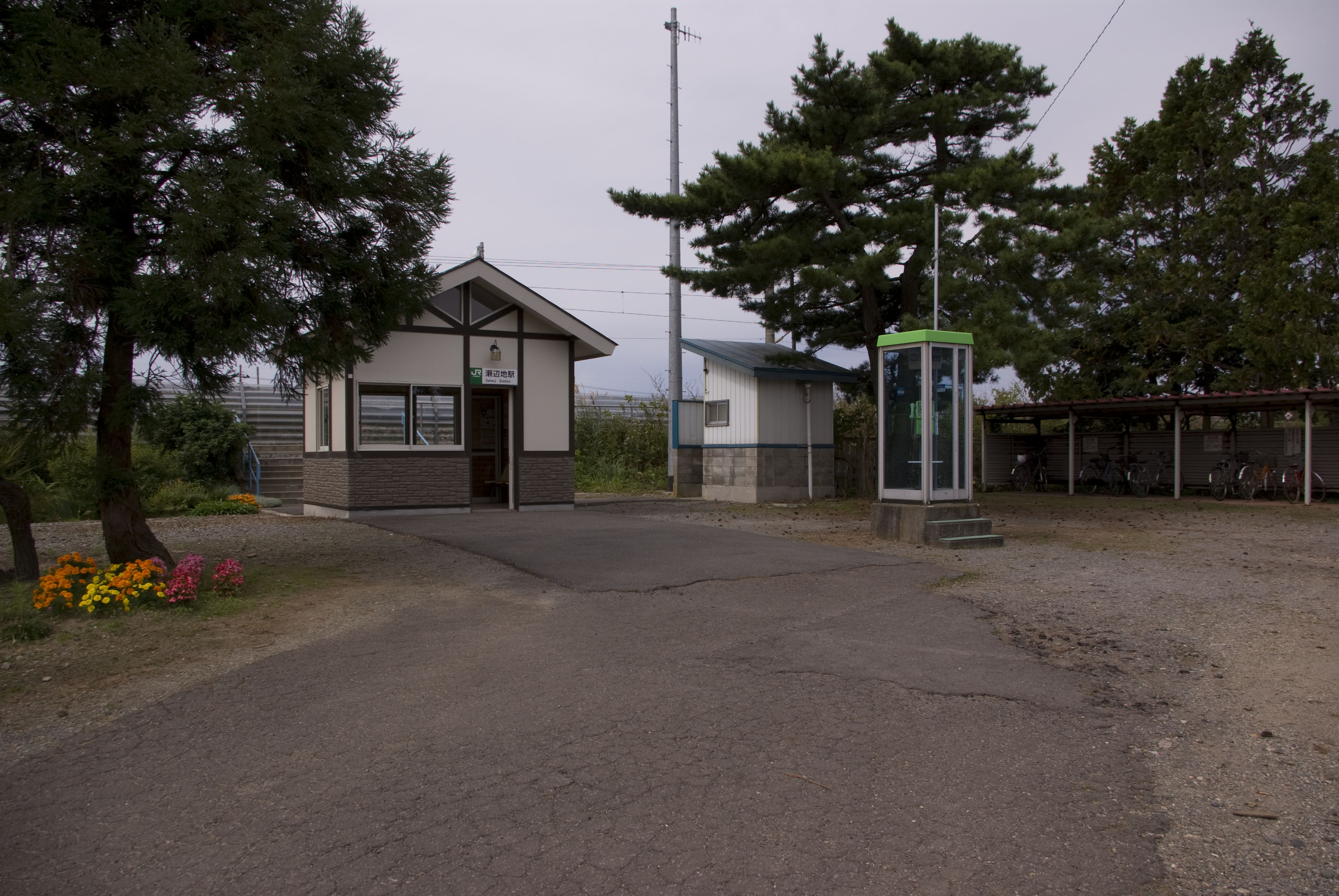
- Seheji Station in September 2009

General information
- Location: 399 Seheji Taura, Yomogita-mura, Higashitsugaru-gun, Aomori-ken 030-1202; Japan
- Coordinates: 41°00′27.94″N 140°38′53.89″E
- Operator: JR East
- Line: ■ Tsugaru Line
- Distance: 23.4 km from Aomori
- Platforms: 1 side platform

Other information
- Status: Unstaffed
- Website: Official website

History
- Opened: December 5, 1951

Services
Preceding station	JR East	Following station
Kanita towards Minmaya	Tsugaru Line	Gōsawa towards Aomori
Location
- Location within Aomori Prefecture Location within Japan

Seheji Station (瀬辺地駅, Seheji-eki) is a railway station on the East Japan Railway Company (JR East) Tsugaru Line located in the village of Yomogita, Aomori Prefecture, Japan.

== Lines ==
Seheji Station is served by the Tsugaru Line, and is located 23.4 km from the starting point of the line at Aomori.

== Station layout ==
Seheji Station has one side platform serving a single bi-directional track. The station building consists only of a waiting room and is unattended.

== History ==
Seheji Station was opened on December 5, 1951, as a station on the Japanese National Railways (JNR). With the privatization of the JNR on April 1, 1987, it came under the operational control of JR East, and has been unattended since the early 1990s. The station building was rebuilt in 2000.

== Surrounding area ==
National Route 280

== See also ==
- List of railway stations in Japan
