= Hidariseki Station =

Railway station in Aomori, Aomori Prefecture, Japan

Hidariseki Station 左堰駅
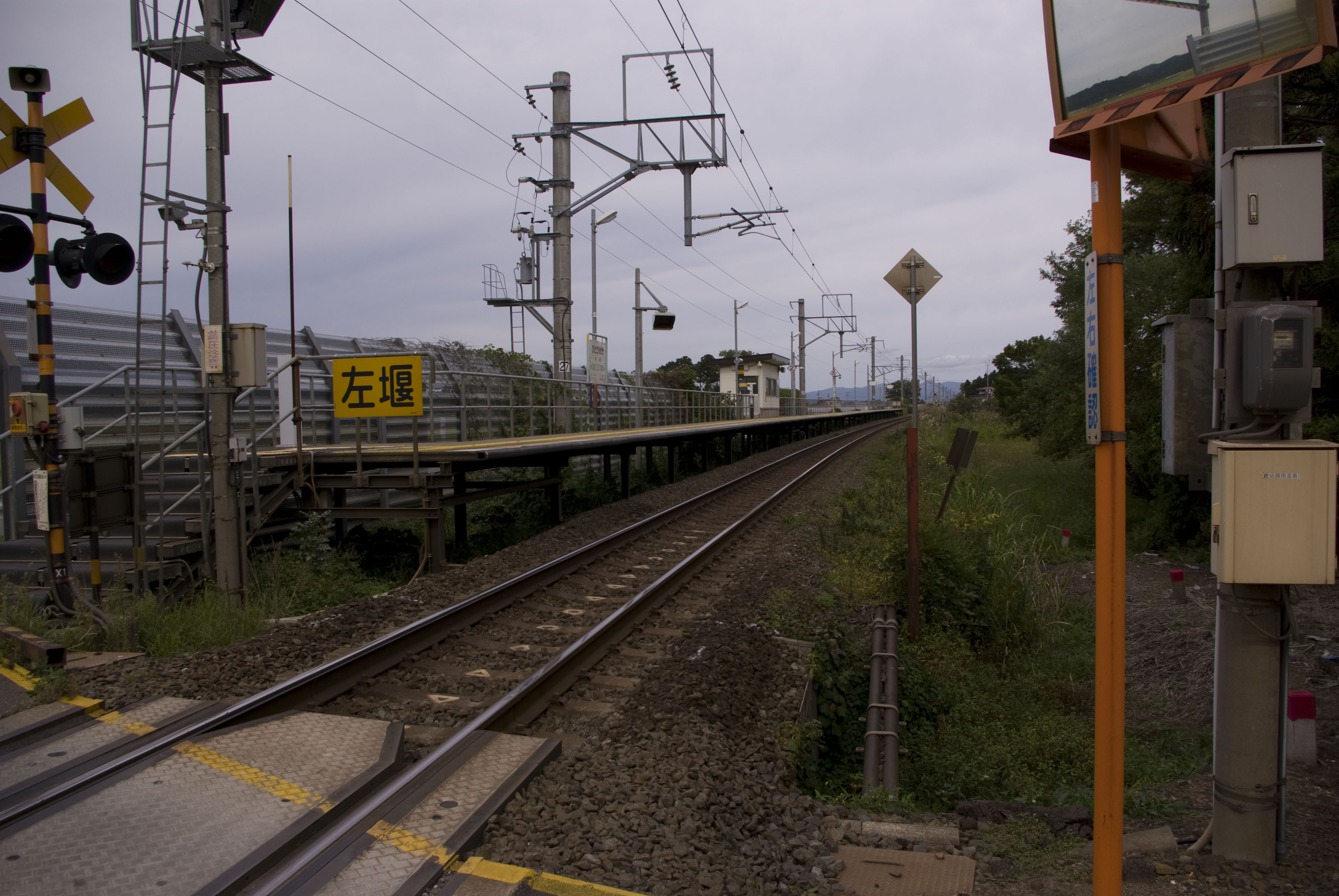
- Hidariseki Station in September 2009

General information
- Location: Hidariseki, Aomori-shi, Aomori-ken 030-1273; Japan
- Coordinates: 40°55′2.02″N 140°39′57.44″E
- Operator: JR East
- Line: ■ Tsugaru Line
- Distance: 13.1 km from Aomori
- Platforms: 1 side platform

Other information
- Status: Unstaffed
- Website: Official website

History
- Opened: November 25, 1959

Services
Preceding station	JR East	Following station
Ushirogata towards Kanita	Tsugaru Line	Okunai towards Aomori
Location
- Location within Aomori Prefecture Location within Japan

Hidariseki Station (左堰駅, Hidariseki-eki) is a railway station on the JR East Tsugaru Line located in the city of Aomori, Aomori Prefecture, Japan.

== Lines ==
Hidariseki Station is served by the Tsugaru Line, and is located 13.1 km from the starting point of the line at Aomori.

== Station layout ==
Hidariseki Station has one side platform serving a single bi-directional track. The station is unattended. There is no station building, but only a weather shelter on the platform.

== History ==
Hidariseki Station was opened on November 25, 1959 as a station on the Japanese National Railways (JNR). With the privatization of the JNR on April 1, 1987, it came under the operational control of JR East.

== Surrounding area ==
National Route 280

== See also ==
- List of railway stations in Japan
