= Yomogita Station =

Railway station in Yomogita, Aomori Prefecture, Japan

Yomogita Station 蓬田駅
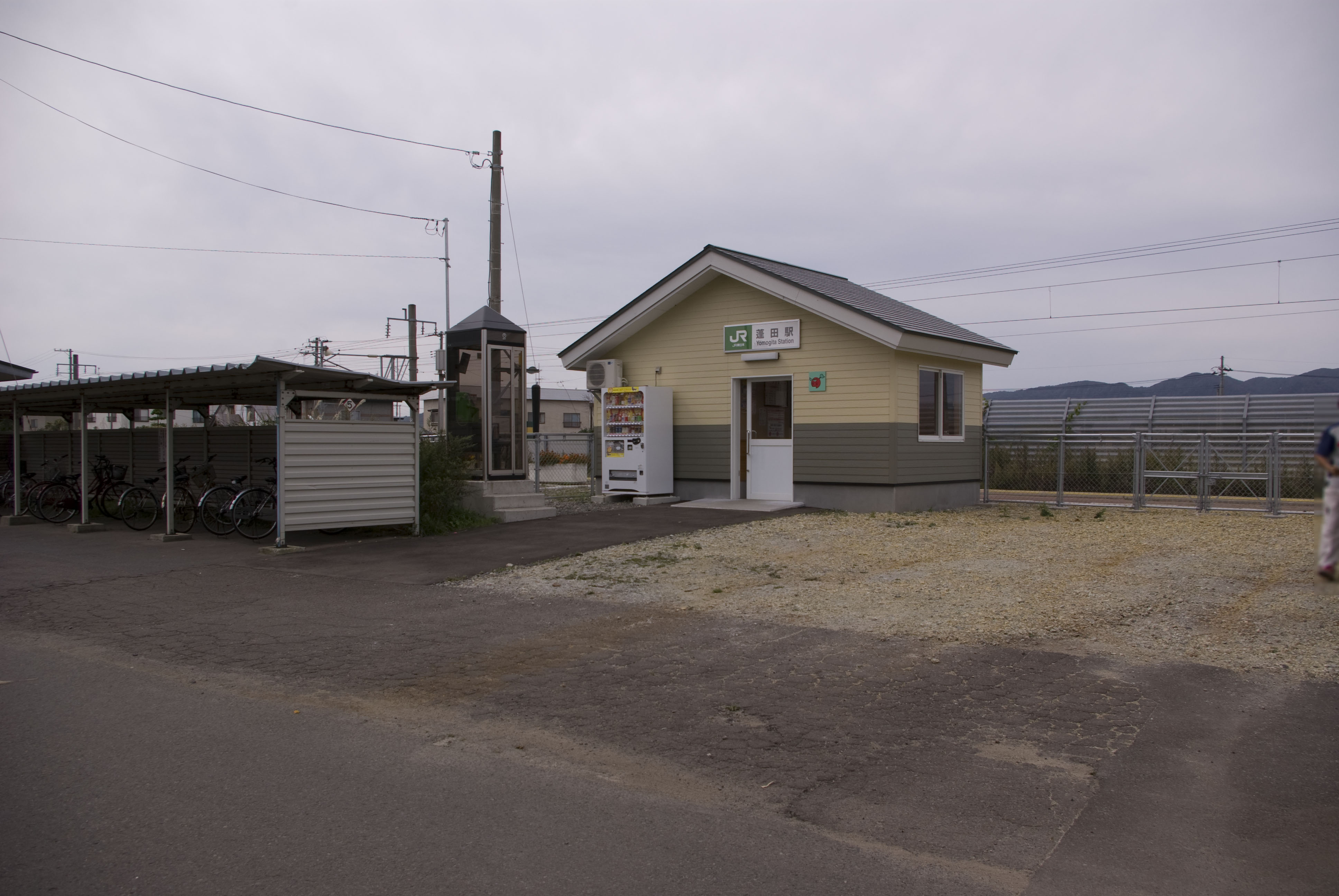
- Yomogita Station in September 2009

General information
- Location: Amidagawa, Yomogita-mura, Higashitsugaru-gun, Aomori-ken 030-1212; Japan
- Coordinates: 40°58′08.97″N 140°39′16.42″E
- Operator: JR East
- Line: ■ Tsugaru Line
- Distance: 19.1 km from Aomori
- Platforms: 1 side platform

Other information
- Status: Unstaffed
- Website: Official website

History
- Opened: December 5, 1951

Services
Preceding station	JR East	Following station
Gōsawa towards Minmaya	Tsugaru Line	Nakasawa towards Aomori
Location
- Location within Aomori Prefecture Location within Japan

Yomogita Station (蓬田駅, Yomogita-eki) is a railway station on the JR East Tsugaru Line located in the village of Yomogita, Aomori Prefecture, Japan.

== Lines ==
Yomogita Station is served by the Tsugaru Line, and is located 19.1 km from the starting point of the line at Aomori.

== Station layout ==
Yomogita Station has one side platform serving a single bi-directional track. The station is unattended.

== History ==
Yomogita Station was opened on December 5, 1951 as a station on the Japanese National Railways (JNR). Scheduled freight operations were discontinued in October 1968. With the privatization of the JNR on April 1, 1987, it came under the operational control of JR East. The station has been unattended since December 2001. A new station building (consisting of a waiting room only) was completed in December 2008.

== Surrounding area ==
National Route 280

== See also ==
- List of railway stations in Japan
