= Aburakawa Station =

Railway station in Aomori, Aomori Prefecture, Japan

Aburakawa Station 油川駅
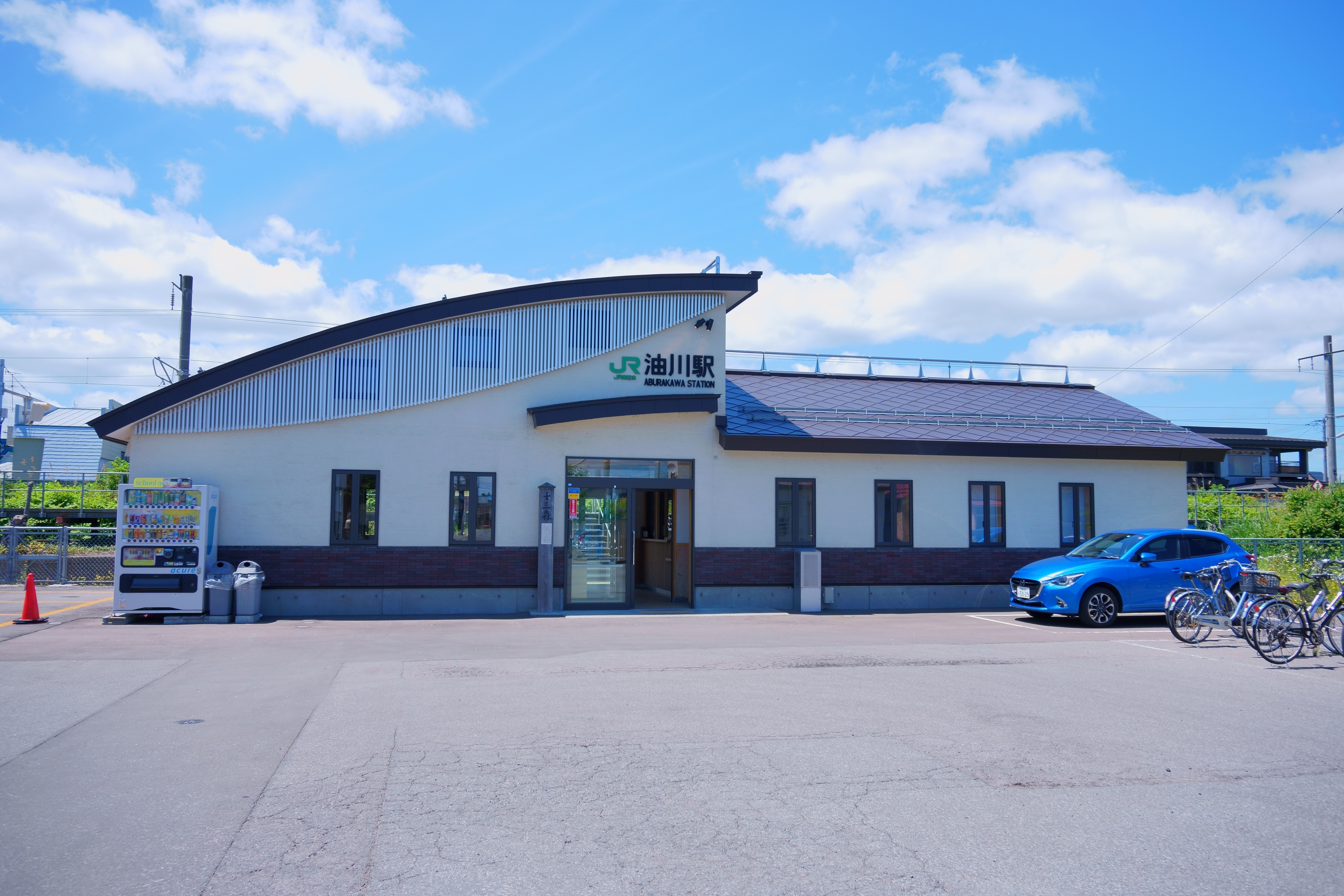
- Aburakawa Station in June 2020

General information
- Location: 73 Hajiro Sawada Aomori-shi, Aomori-ken 038-0058; Japan
- Coordinates: 40°51′25.31″N 140°41′25.59″E
- Operator: JR East
- Line: ■ Tsugaru Line
- Distance: 6.0 km from Aomori
- Platforms: 1 side platform

Other information
- Status: Unstaffed station
- Website: Official website

History
- Opened: December 5, 1951

Passengers
- FY2021: 328 daily

Services
Preceding station	JR East	Following station
Tsugaru-Miyata towards Kanita	Tsugaru Line	Aomori Terminus
Location
- Location within Aomori Prefecture Location within Japan

Aburakawa Station (油川駅, Aburakawa-eki) is a railway station on the East Japan Railway Company (JR East) Tsugaru Line located in the city of Aomori, Aomori Prefecture, Japan.

== Lines ==
Aburakawa Station is served by the Tsugaru Line and is located 6.0 kilometres (3.7 mi) from the starting point of the line at Aomori.

== Station layout ==
Aburakawa Station has one side platform serving a single bi-directional track. The station is a kan'i itaku station, administered by Aomori Station, and operated by the local Jaster Corporation, with point-of-sales terminal installed. The short platform requires that trains longer than seven carriages use a door cut system.

== History ==
Aburakawa Station was opened on December 5, 1951, as a station on the Japanese National Railways (JNR). Freight operations were discontinued from July 1970. The station became a kan'i itaku station on April 1, 1971, operated by the Japan Travel Bureau. With the privatization of the JNR on April 1, 1987, it came under the operational control of JR East and was operated by JR East until October 1, 2003, when it again became a kan'i itaku station, this time under the Jaster Corporation.

== Route bus ==
- Aburakawa-Eki-dōri bus stop
- Aomori municipal Bus
  - For Ushirogata via Okunai
  - For Furukawa via Oxidate

== Passenger statistics ==
In fiscal 2016, the station was used by an average of 405 passengers daily (boarding passengers only).

== Surrounding area ==
- Aburakawa Post Office
- Aomori-Kita High School

== See also ==
- List of railway stations in Japan
