= Tsugaru Line =

Railway line in Aomori Prefecture, Japan

- JR East 701 series EMU on the Tsugaru Line at Kanita Station

Overview
- Owner: JR East
- Termini: Aomori; Kanita
- Stations: 18

Service
- Type: Heavy rail Passenger
- Rolling stock: 701 series

History
- Opened: 1951; 75 years ago

Technical
- Line length: 55.8 km (34.7 mi)
- Track gauge: 1,067 mm (3 ft 6 in)
- Electrification: Overhead line, 20 kV 50 Hz AC
Route map

The Tsugaru Line (Japanese: 津軽線, Hepburn: Tsugaru-sen) is a railway line operated by East Japan Railway Company (JR East). The line connects Aomori Station in Aomori with Minmaya Station in Imabetsu on the Tsugaru Peninsula in western Aomori Prefecture.

On 3 August 2022, the section between Kanita and Minmaya suffered significant flood damage and has been out of service since then. JR East has since announced that the section will be permanently closed on 1 April 2027.

== Seikan Tunnel connection ==
From 13 March 1988 (the opening of the Seikan Tunnel) until 26 March 2016, the section of the line between Aomori and Naka-Oguni was part of the Tsugaru-Kaikyō Line - a line that consisted of portions of 4 separate lines which connected Aomori Station in Honshu through the Seikan Tunnel to Hokkaido. The junction of the Tsugaru and Kaikyo Lines is Shin‑Naka‑Oguni Signal Station (新中小国信号場, Shin-Naka-Oguni Shingōjō) [ja], 2.3 km (1.4 mi) past Naka-Oguni Station.

On 26 March 2016 the Hokkaido Shinkansen commenced operation, replacing all existing passenger services through the Seikan Tunnel. From this date the "Tsugaru-Kaikyō" line name ceased to be used, with the Kaikyō Line (Naka-Oguni—Kikonai) becoming a freight-only line.

From 1 May 2017, the luxury excursion train Train Suite Shiki-shima commenced operation using the Tsugaru Line and the Kaikyo Line.

== Stations ==
All stations are located in Aomori Prefecture.

Station	Distance in km (mi)		Transfers	Location
Station	Between stations	Total	Transfers	Location
Aomori 青森	—N/a	0 (0)	■ Ōu Main Line; Aoimori Railway Line	Aomori
Aburakawa 油川	6.0 (3.7)	6.0 (3.7)		Aomori
Tsugaru-Miyata 津軽宮田	3.7 (2.3)	9.7 (6.0)		Aomori
Okunai 奥内	1.8 (1.1)	11.5 (7.1)		Aomori
Hidariseki 左堰	1.6 (0.99)	13.1 (8.1)		Aomori
Ushirogata 後潟	1.6 (0.99)	14.7 (9.1)		Aomori
Nakasawa 中沢	2.1 (1.3)	16.8 (10.4)		Aomori
Yomogita 蓬田	2.3 (1.4)	19.1 (11.9)		Yomogita
Gōsawa 郷沢	2.0 (1.2)	21.1 (13.1)		Yomogita
Seheji 瀬辺地	2.3 (1.4)	23.4 (14.5)		Yomogita
Kanita 蟹田	3.6 (2.2)	27.0 (16.8)		Sotogahama

=== Closed section ===
Station	Distance in km (mi)		Transfers	Location
Station	Between stations	Total	Transfers	Location
Kanita 蟹田	—N/a	27.0 (16.8)		Sotogahama
Naka-Oguni 中小国	3.4 (2.1)	31.4 (19.5)		Sotogahama
Ōdai 大平	3.6 (2.2)	35.0 (21.7)		Sotogahama
Tsugaru-Futamata 津軽二股	11.6 (7.2)	46.6 (29.0)	Hokkaido Shinkansen (Okutsugaru-Imabetsu)	Imabetsu
Ōkawadai 大川平	2.0 (1.2)	48.6 (30.2)		Imabetsu
Imabetsu 今別	2.4 (1.5)	51.0 (31.7)		Imabetsu
Tsugaru-Hamana 津軽浜名	1.7 (1.1)	52.7 (32.7)		Imabetsu
Minmaya 三厩	3.1 (1.9)	55.8 (34.7)		Imabetsu

== Rolling stock ==
=== Current rolling stock ===
- 701 series EMU

=== Former rolling stock ===
==== Tsugaru Line Local Services ====
- GV-E400 series DEMU - March 2021 to 14 March 2025 †
- KiHa 40/48 series DMU - until 25 March 2016 (all Kanita—Minmaya services and Aomori—Kanita—Minmaya through services)
- KiHa 22 series DMU

† From March 2021 until 3 August 2022, GV-E400 series DEMU operated all Kanita—Minmaya services and the Aomori—Kanita—Minmaya through services (1 daily trip in each direction). From 3 August 2022 until 14 March 2025 they operated the Aomori—Kanita section of the former Aomori—Kanita—Minmaya through services (1 daily trip in each direction).

==== Tsugaru-Kaikyō Line Limited Express services (13 March 1988–21 March 2016) ====
- 485 series EMU
- E751 series EMU
- 789 series EMU

== History ==
Plans existed to link the prefectural capital of Aomori with the northern tip of the Tsugaru Peninsula from the time of the Meiji period Railway Construction Act. In 1930, the privately held Tsugaru Railway began operations on the western side of Tsugaru Peninsula, and surveying work was completed by the Japanese Government Railways (JGR) to build a government-operated line on the eastern side of Tsugaru Peninsula. These plans were postponed by the outbreak of World War II and were only resumed in the 1950s under the Japanese National Railways (JNR).

On 5 December 1951, the first segment of the Tsugaru Line was completed from Aomori to Kanita. This was extended by 21 October 1958, to the present northern terminus at Minmaya. Additional intermediate stations were added in 1959 and 1960.

All scheduled freight operations were suspended on 10 December 1984.

With the privatization of the JNR on 1 April 1987, the line came under the operational control of JR East.

In 1988 the Aomori–Shin Naka-Oguni Signal Station section was electrified in conjunction with the opening of the Seikan Tunnel and associated Tsugaru-Kaikyō Line.

From 13 March 1988 (the opening of the Seikan Tunnel), the tracks between Aomori Station and the Shin Naka-Oguni Signal Station became part of the Tsugaru-Kaikyō Line, jointly used by JR East, JR Hokkaido's Tsugaru-Kaikyō Line, and Japan Freight Railway Company (JR Freight).

On 26 March 2016 the Hokkaido Shinkansen commenced operation and replaced all existing passenger services through the Seikan Tunnel. The "Tsugaru-Kaikyō" line name ceased to be used, with the Kaikyō Line (Naka-Oguni—Kikonai) becoming a freight-only line.

On 1 May 2017, the luxury excursion train Train Suite Shiki-shima commenced operation using the Tsugaru Line between Aomori and Naka-Oguni to access the Kaikyo Line en route to Hokkaido.

On 3 August 2022, the section between Kanita and Minmaya suffered significant flood damage and has been out of service since then with replacement bus and shared taxi services operating. On 23 May 2024, Imabetsu Town was the final local government to agree with the permanent conversion of the Kanita to Minmaya section to bus & taxi services. JR East has announced that the section will be officially closed on 1 April 2027.

== See also ==
- List of railway lines in Japan
