= Tsugaru-Kaikyō Line =

Former railway line in Aomori Prefecture, Japan

The Tsugaru-Kaikyō Line consisted of both the red and blue segments

The Tsugaru-Kaikyō Line (津軽海峡線, Tsugaru-Kaikyō-sen) was a railway line in northern Japan that linked Aomori Station in Aomori Prefecture and Hakodate Station in Hokkaido between March 1988 and March 2016.

The Tsugaru-Kaikyō Line was actually made up of portions of four separate lines: the East Japan Railway Company (JR East) Tsugaru Line and t Hokkaido Railway Company (JR Hokkaido) Kaikyō Line, Esashi Line & Hakodate Main Line. The name was created in conjunction with the opening of the Kaikyō Line and the Seikan Tunnel on 13 March 1988.

The line name has been out of use since 26 March 2016 when the Hokkaido Shinkansen opened and replaced all regular passenger services between Aomori and Hakodate. Of the four railway lines that formed the Tsugaru-Kaikyō Line: the Tsugaru Line and the Hakodate Main Line sections continued to operate both freight and passenger trains, while the Kaikyō Line became freight-only (until 2017 when the luxury excursion train Train Suite Shiki-shima commenced operation) and the Esashi Line was transferred to third-sector railway company South Hokkaido Railway Company.

== Station and line divisions ==
JR East

- Tsugaru Line: Aomori Station — Naka-Oguni Station

JR Hokkaido

- Kaikyō Line: Naka-Oguni Station — Kikonai Station
- Esashi Line (present-day South Hokkaido Railway Company): Kikonai Station — Goryōkaku Station
- Hakodate Main Line: Goryōkaku Station — Hakodate Station

The actual junction of the Kaikyo Line and Tsugaru Line is Shin Naka-Oguni Signal Station (新中小国信号場) [ja], 2.3 km (1.4 mi) past Naka-Oguni Station.

== Limited Express trains ==
Limited Express trains operating on the Tsugaru-Kaikyō Line included:

=== Daytime trains ===
- Hakuchō and Super Hakuchō

=== Sleeper trains ===
- Hokutosei
- Cassiopeia
- Twilight Express
- Hamanasu
