= Minmaya Station =

Railway station in Imabetsu, Aomori Prefecture, Japan

Minmaya Station 三厩駅
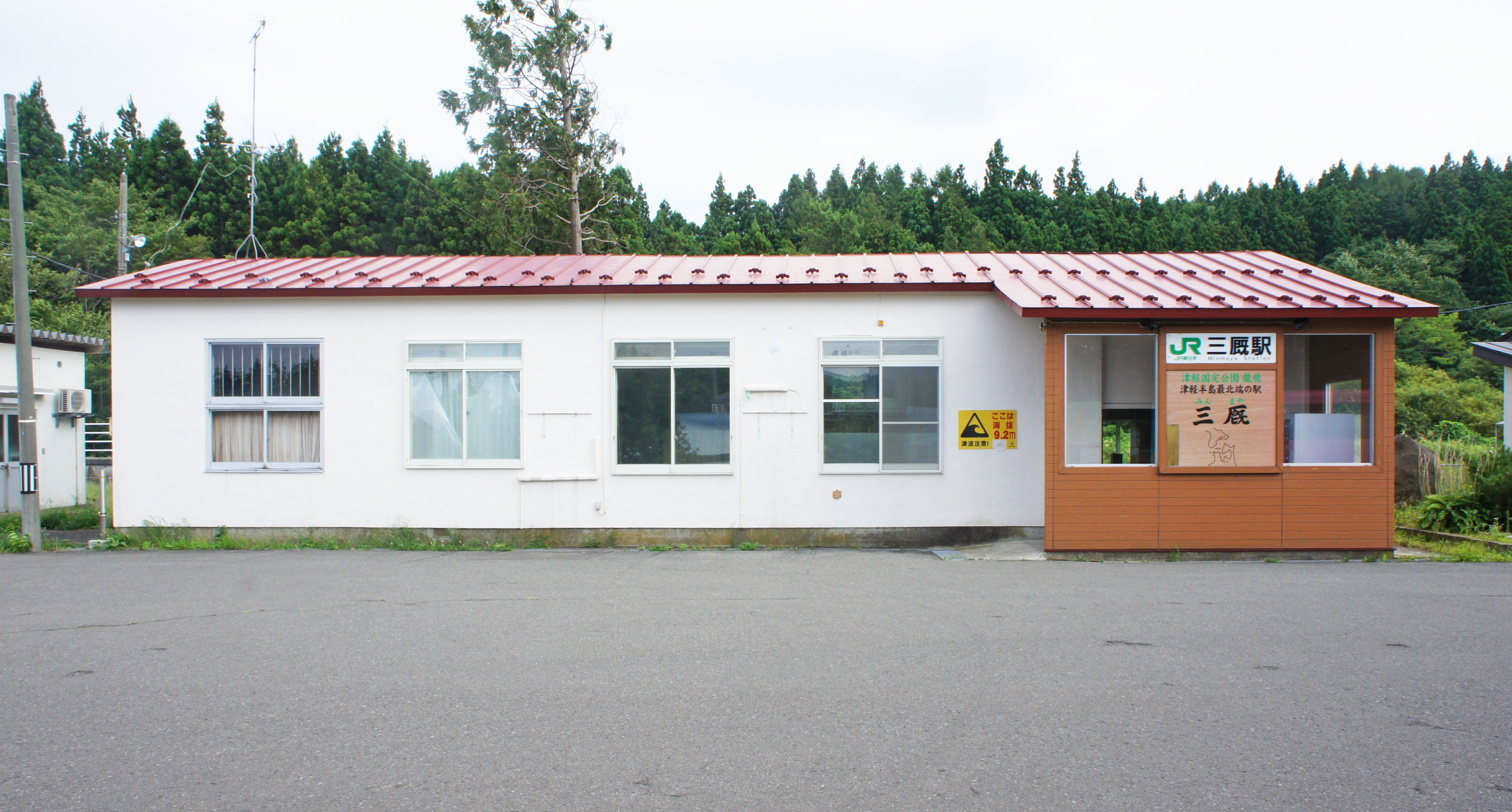
- Station building in August 2020

General information
- Location: 299 Minmaya Higashicho; Sotogahama, Aomori; Japan
- Coordinates: 41°11′08″N 140°26′40″E
- Operator: JR East
- Line: Tsugaru Line
- Distance: 55.8 km (34.7 mi) from Aomori
- Platforms: 1 island platform

Construction
- Structure type: At-grade

Other information
- Status: Closed
- Website: Official website

History
- Opened: 21 October 1958; 67 years ago
- Closed: 3 August 2022; 4 years ago

Passengers
- FY2018: 25

Former services
Preceding station	JR East	Following station
Terminus	Tsugaru Line	Tsugaru-Hamana towards Aomori
Location
- Location within Aomori Prefecture Location within Japan

Minmaya Station (Japanese: 三厩駅, Hepburn: Minmaya-eki) was the northern terminal railway station on the JR East Tsugaru Line located in the town of Sotogahama, Aomori Prefecture, Japan.

== Lines ==
Minmaya Station was a terminal station on the Tsugaru Line, located 55.8 kilometres (34.7 mi) from the opposing terminal of the line at Aomori.

== Station layout ==
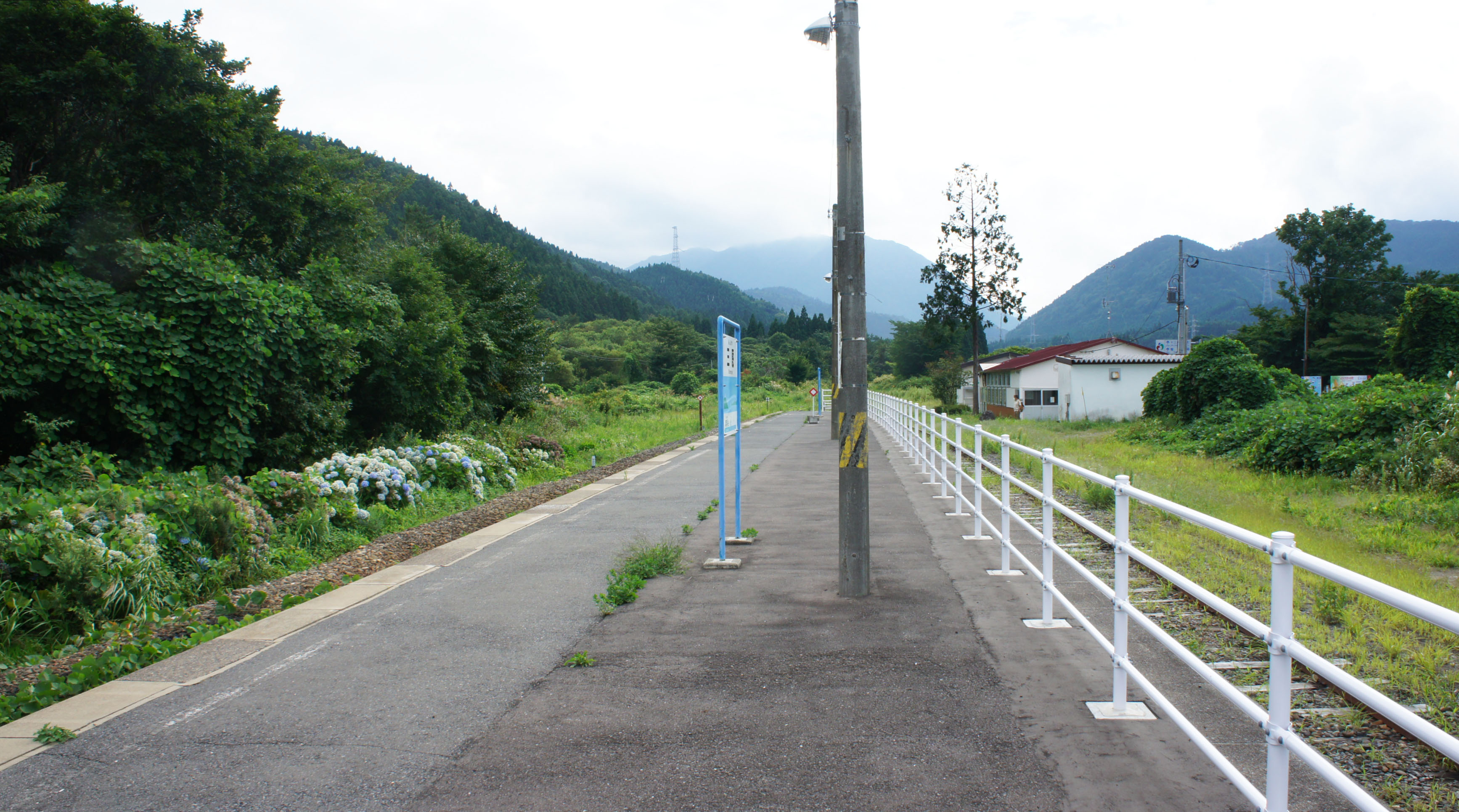
The platform in August 2020

Minmaya Station had one island platform connected to the station building by a level crossing.

== History ==
Minmaya Station was opened on October 21, 1958, as Miumaya Station on the Japanese National Railways (JNR). With the privatization of the JNR on April 1, 1987, it came under the operational control of JR East. It officially adopted the present pronunciation of its name on March 16, 1991. The station became unstaffed on June 1, 2019.

On 3 August 2022, service between Kanita and Minmaya was suspended indefinitely following heavy rainfall and flooding. On 10 June 2025, JR East, Aomori Prefecture, and the two municipalities along the affected section agreed to abolish passenger railway service in April 2027 and replace it with road transportation, including buses and taxis. The replacement services will integrate existing bus and taxi services and add new routes. JR East will contribute more than ¥3 billion to a nonprofit organization established jointly with local governments to operate the replacement transportation for 18 years.

== Surrounding area ==
- National Route 280
- National Route 339
- former Minmaya Village Hall

== Passenger statistics ==
In fiscal 2018, the station was used by an average of 25 passengers daily.

== See also ==
- List of railway stations in Japan
