= Kanita Station =

Railway station in Sotogahama, Aomori Prefecture, Japan

Kanita Station 蟹田駅
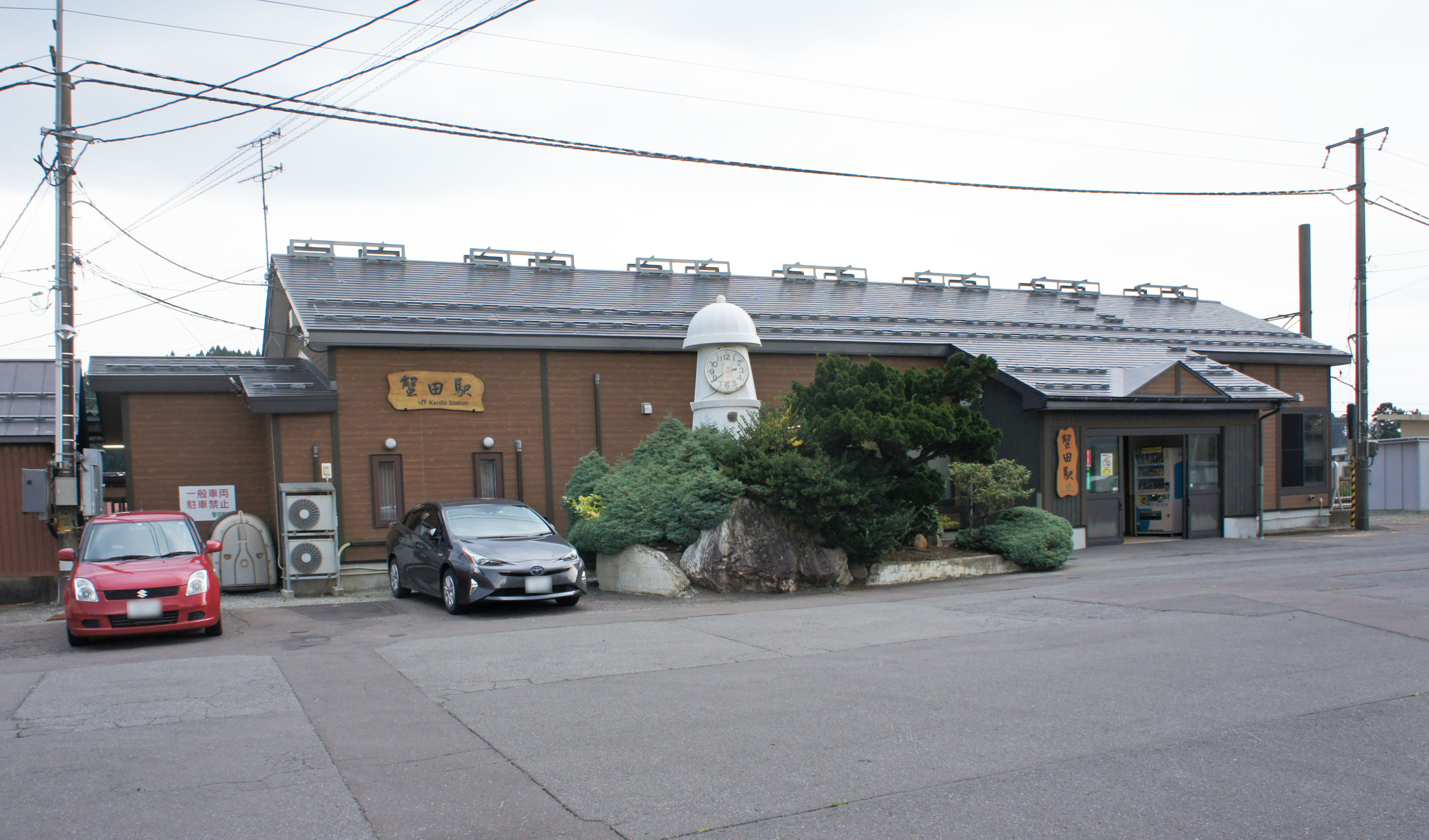
- Kanita Station in August 2020

General information
- Location: 55 Kami-Kanita; Sotogahama, Aomori; Japan
- Coordinates: 41°02′19″N 140°38′32″E
- Operator: JR East
- Line: Tsugaru Line
- Distance: 27.0 km (16.8 mi) from Aomori
- Platforms: 1 side platform, 1 island platform
- Tracks: 3

Construction
- Structure type: At-grade

Other information
- Status: Staffed (Midori no Madoguchi)
- Website: Official website

History
- Opened: 5 December 1951; 74 years ago

Passengers
- FY2016: 164

Services
Preceding station	JR East	Following station
Terminus	Tsugaru Line	Seheji towards Aomori

Former services
Preceding station	JR East	Following station
Naka-Oguni towards Minmaya	Tsugaru Line (until 2022)	Seheji towards Aomori
Location
- Location within Aomori Prefecture Location within Japan

Kanita Station (Japanese: 蟹田駅, Hepburn: Kanita-eki) is a railway station on the Tsugaru Line in the town of Sotogahama, Aomori, Japan, operated by East Japan Railway Company (JR East).

== Lines ==
Kanita Station is served by the Tsugaru Line, and is located 27.0 kilometres (16.8 mi) from the starting point of the line at Aomori.

== Station layout ==
Kanita Station has one side platform and one island platform connected by a footbridge, serving a total of four tracks (one track is a siding). The station is attended, and has a Midori no Madoguchi staffed ticket office.

=== Platforms ===
1	■ Tsugaru Line	for Aomori
2	■ Tsugaru Line	for Aomori
3	■ Tsugaru Line	for Minmaya

== History ==
Kanita Station was opened on December 5, 1951 as a station operated by Japanese National Railways (JNR). With the privatization of the JNR on April 1, 1987, it came under the operational control of JR East. Services on the Tsugaru Kaikyō Line began on March 13, 1988, and ceased operations on March 26, 2016 when the Hokkaido Shinkansen opened and replaced regular passenger services connecting Aomori and Hakodate.

On 3 August 2022, service between Kanita and Minmaya was suspended indefinitely following heavy rainfall and flooding. On 10 June 2025, JR East, Aomori Prefecture, and the two municipalities along the affected section agreed to abolish passenger railway service in April 2027 and replace it with road transportation, including buses and taxis. The replacement services will integrate existing bus and taxi services and add new routes. JR East will contribute more than ¥3 billion to a nonprofit organization established jointly with local governments to operate the replacement transportation for 18 years.

== Passenger statistics ==
In fiscal 2016, the station was used by an average of 164 passengers daily (boarding passengers only)

== Bus services ==
- Tairadate area line bus

== Surrounding area ==
National Route 280

- Sotogahama center hospital
- Sotogahama town office
- Kanita post office

== See also ==
- List of railway stations in Japan
