= Aomori Station =

Railway station in Aomori, Aomori Prefecture, Japan

Aomori Station 青森駅
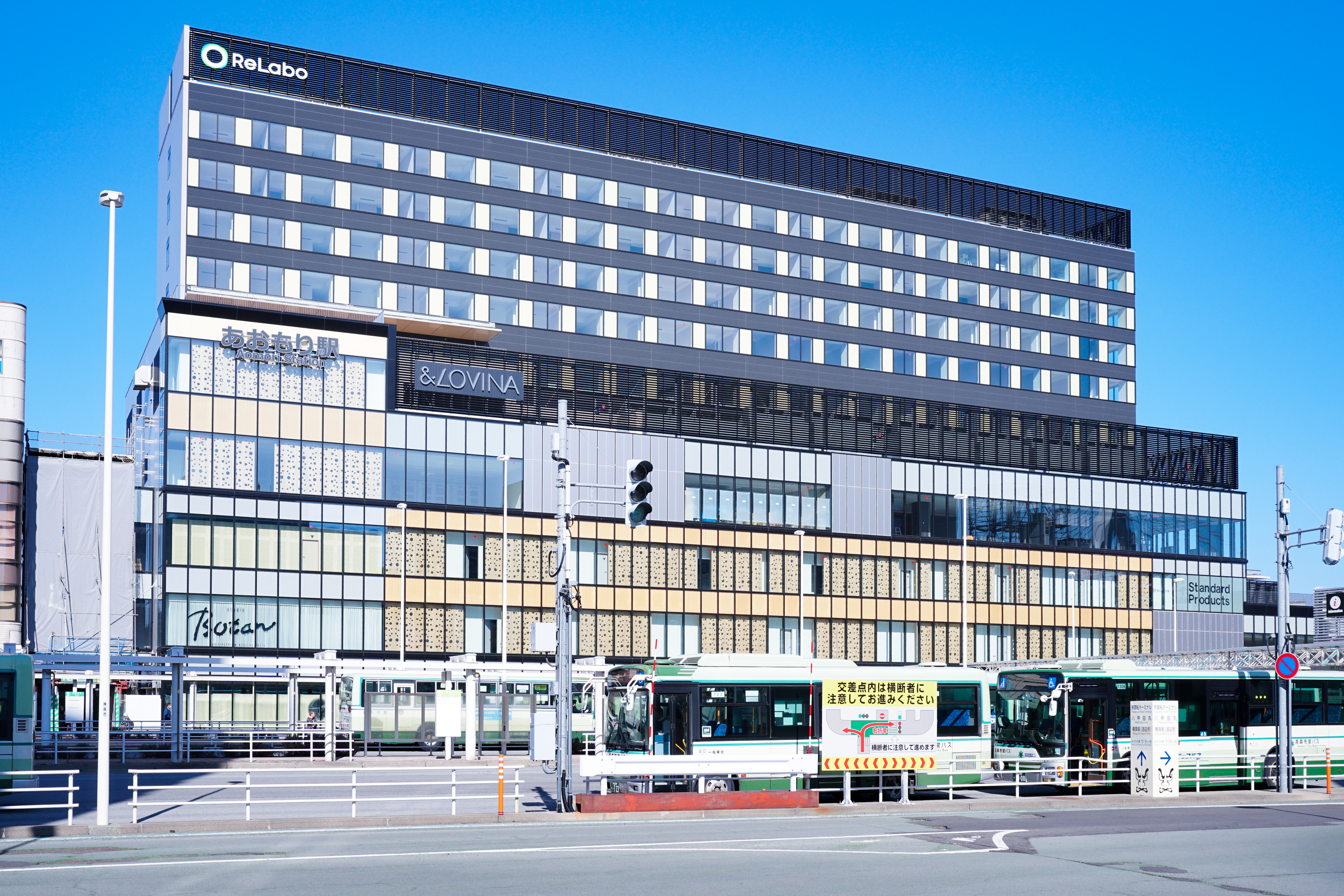
- Station building in March 2024

General information
- Location: 1 Yanagawa; Aomori; Japan
- Coordinates: 40°49′44″N 140°44′05″E
- Operator: JR East; Aoimori Railway Company
- Lines: Ōu Main Line; Tsugaru Line; Aoimori Railway Line
- Platforms: 3 island platforms
- Connections: Bus terminal

Other information
- Status: Staffed (Midori no Madoguchi)

History
- Opened: 1 September 1891; 135 years ago
- Rebuilt: 27 March 2021

Passengers
- FY2016: JR East: 5,342 (daily)

Services
Preceding station	JR East	Following station
Shin-Aomori towards Akita	Tsugaru	Terminus
Shin-Aomori towards Akita	Ōu Main Line Rapid	Terminus
Shin-Aomori towards Shinjō	Ōu Main Line Local	Terminus
Aburakawa towards Kanita	Tsugaru Line	Terminus
Preceding station	Aoimori Railway	Following station
Tsutsui towards Metoki	Aoimori Railway Line	Terminus
Location
- Location within Aomori Prefecture Location within Japan

Aomori Station (Japanese: 青森駅, Hepburn: Aomori-eki) is a railway station in the city of Aomori in Aomori Prefecture, Japan. The station has been operating since September 1891, though the most recent station building, which consists of three island platforms connected to the station building by a footbridge, was completed in March 2021. Since 1987 the station has been used by the East Japan Railway Company (JR East) which operates various services to destinations throughout the Tōhoku region. Since 2010 the station's operations have been jointly run by JR East and the Aoimori Railway Company, a third sector, regional rail operator.

== Location ==
Aomori Station is located at the western terminus of Aomori Prefecture Route 16, a 1,169-meter-long (3,835 ft) road that provides access to the station from Japan National Route 4 in central Aomori. The station is situated within the urban core of central Aomori and is near the city hall, prefectural hall, the city library, and several landmarks and museums including the Aomori Bay Bridge, A-Factory, and Nebuta Museum Wa Rasse. Aomori Station is the northern terminus of the Ōu Main Line and the Aoimori Railway Line and the southern terminus of the Tsugaru Line. The stations adjacent to it along those lines, respectively, are Shin-Aomori Station, Tsutsui Station, and Aburakawa Station.

== Station layout ==
Aomori Station has three island platforms connected to the station building by a footbridge. The station has a Midori no Madoguchi staffed ticket office, a convenience store, and a View Plaza travel agency. The station's two ticket offices for JR East and the Aoimori Railway Company are attended daily from 5:20 am to 10:30 pm, while the View Plaza agency is attended from 10:00 am to 5:30 pm daily. Tickets can also be purchased at two separate automatic dispensers for JR East and the Aoimori Railway Company. A second footbridge added during the station's reconfiguration in March 2021 connects the areas to the east and west of the station, allowing pedestrians to cross over the station's platforms without purchasing a ticket.

=== Platforms ===
1	■ Aoimori Railway Line	for Asamushi-Onsen, Noheji, and Hachinohe
2	■ Aoimori Railway Line	for Asamushi-Onsen, Noheji, and Hachinohe
2	■ Ōu Main Line	for Shin-Aomori, Hirosaki, Ōdate, and Akita
3–6	■ Ōu Main Line	for Shin-Aomori, Hirosaki, Odate, and Akita
3–6	■ Tsugaru Line	for Kanita

== History ==
The station opened on 1 September 1891 as the northern terminus of the Ueno–Aomori line of the Nippon Railway. It became a station on the Tōhoku Main Line of the Japanese Government Railways (JGR), the pre-war predecessor to the Japan National Railways (JNR), after the nationalization of the Nippon Railway on 1 November 1906. The station and its adjacent port facilities were destroyed during strategic bombing of Aomori in World War II on 28 July 1945. Kominato Station in Hiranai picked up the destroyed station's role as the terminal station of the Tōhoku Main Line until the reconstruction of Aomori Station was completed on 15 July 1949. The temporary structure built after the war was replaced in 1959 with the station building that was used until March 2021.

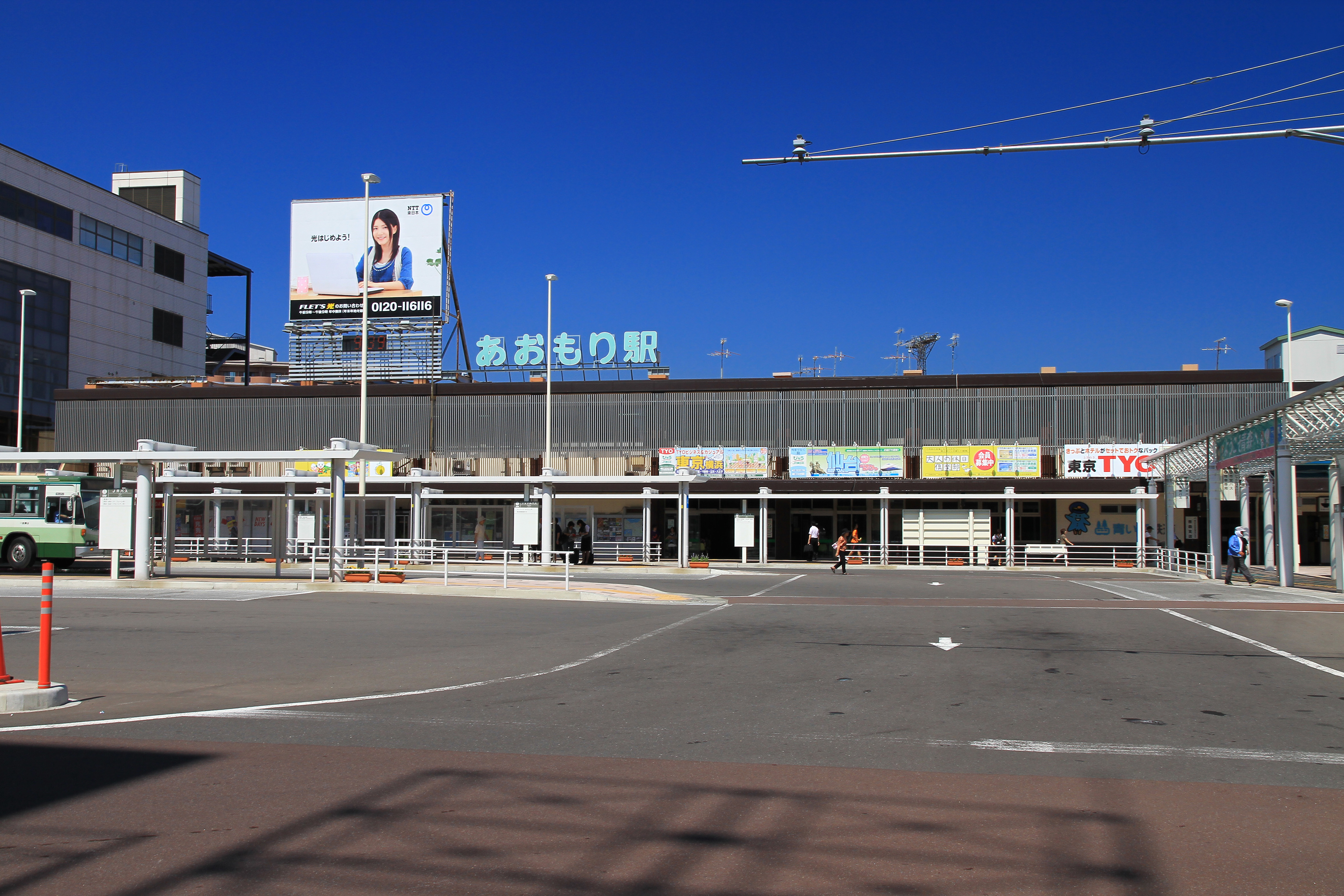
Aomori Station in July 2011

With the privatization of Japanese National Railways (JNR) on 1 April 1987, the station came under the control of JR East. On 4 December 2010, the Tōhoku Shinkansen was successfully extended north to Shin-Aomori Station from Hachinohe. As a result of the opening of the bullet train between the two stations, that section of the Tōhoku Main Line including the line's platforms at Aomori Station was transferred to the Aoimori Railway Company from JR East on the same day.

In October 2018 construction commenced on the fifth iteration of the Aomori Station building with improved access to the station's western entrance. On 27 March 2021, the fourth-generation station building was closed following the opening of the fifth-generation station building and the conclusion of celebratory festivities in the older building. Following the movement of station operations, the area occupied by the older building is slated to be replaced with commercial space operated by the city of Aomori and JR East as well as a hotel that overlooks the station platforms. The multi-use, ten-story building is set to be complete in 2024.

== Services ==
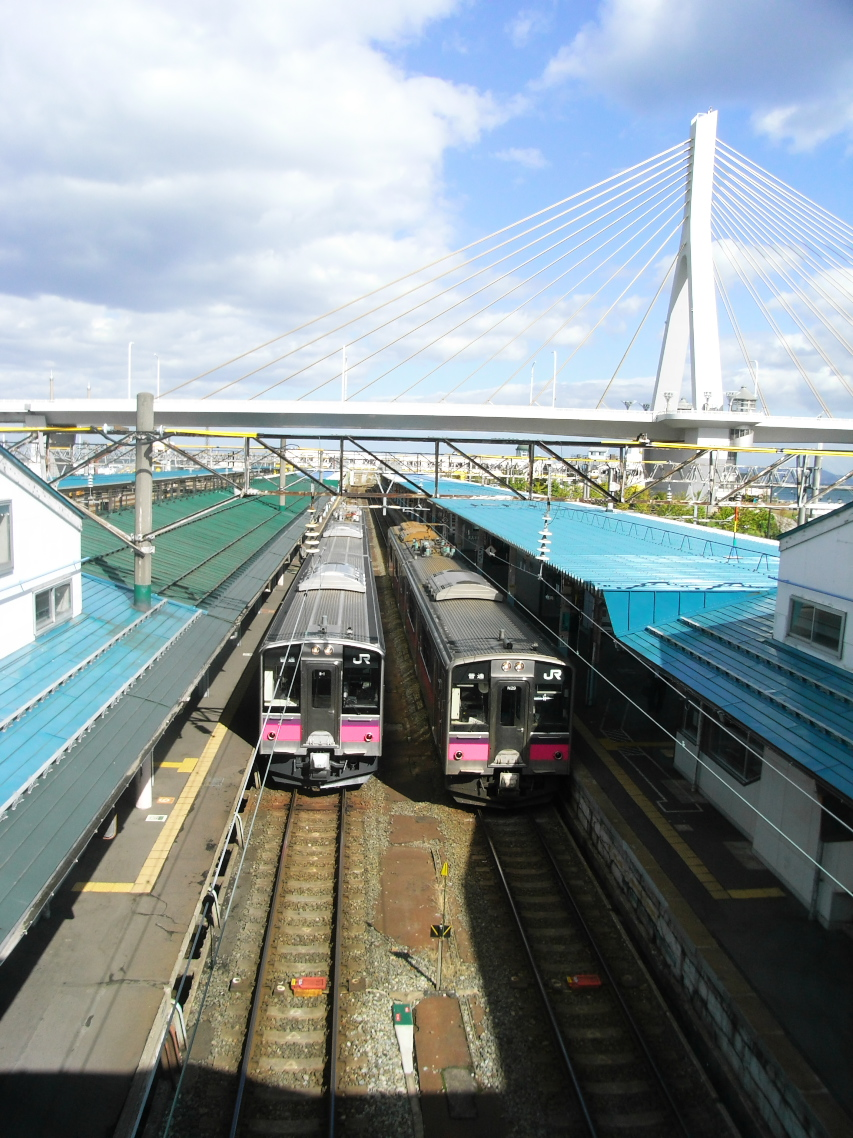
Aomori Bay Bridge and trains for the JR Ōu Main Line

Aomori Station is served by the Ōu Main Line and the Tsugaru Line of JR East. It is also served by the regional Aoimori Railway Line. The Tsugaru-Kaikyō Line formerly served Aomori Station as a connection to Hakodate in Hokkaido via the Seikan Tunnel; however, with the opening of the Hokkaido Shinkansen, conventional rail passenger services between Aomori and Hakodate have since been discontinued.

=== Aoimori Railway services ===
Aomori Station is primarily served by trains operating on a local service on the Aoimori Railway Line between it and Hachinohe Station. Passenger trains serve Aomori Station just over 17 hours a day from 5:40 am to 10:58 pm. Except for morning and evening peak hours, trains depart roughly at 25 to 80 minute intervals.

=== Limited express train services ===
The following limited express services stop at Aomori Station:

- Tsugaru (Akita - Aomori)

=== Former services ===
The following Limited express services used to stop at Aomori Station:

- Hakuchō / Super Hakuchō (Shin-Aomori - Hakodate via Aomori)

The following overnight sleeping car services also used to operate to and from Aomori Station.

- Akebono (Ueno - Aomori)
- Nihonkai (Osaka - Aomori)

=== Bus services ===
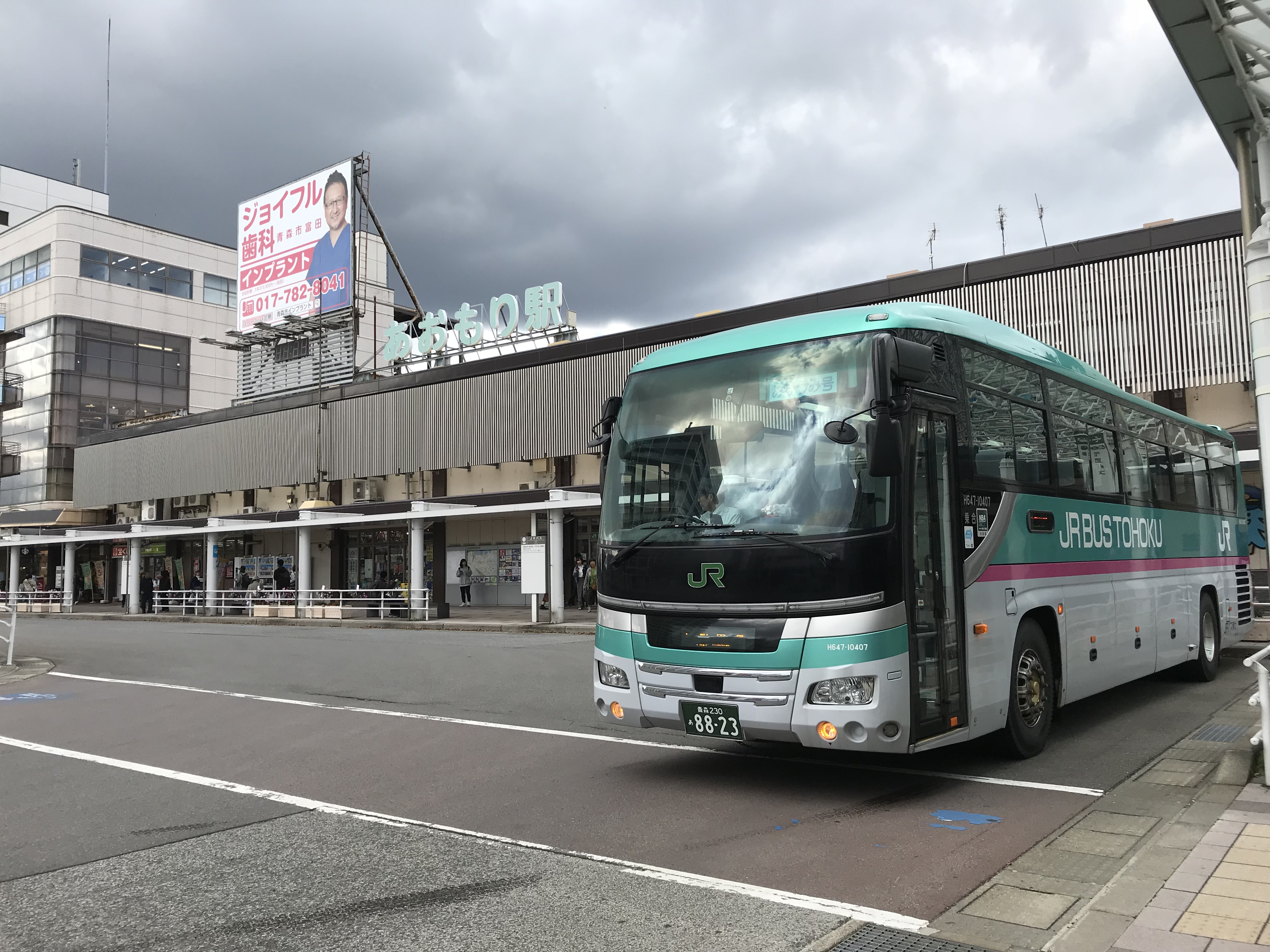
A bus of JR Bus Tōhoku at the station's bus terminal.

Buses serving the station are operated by the following operators.

- Aomori City Bus
- Kōnan Bus Company
- JR Bus Tōhoku
- Towada Kankō Electric Railway
- Shimokita Kōtsu

==== Highway buses ====
- Asunaro; For Namioka, Kuroishi, Kosaka, and Morioka Station
- Blue City; For Sendai Station
- Sky; For Ueno Station
- Panda; For Ueno Station
- Enburi; For Shinjuku Station and Tokyo Station
- Tsugaru; For Shinjuku Station and Tokyo Station
- Dream Aomori–Tokyo; For Tokyo Station and Tokyo Disneyland

=== Passenger statistics ===
In fiscal 2016, the JR East portion of the station was used by an average of 5,342 passengers daily (boarding passengers only).

== In popular culture ==
Aomori Station is the setting for the 1977 enka song by Sayuri Ishikawa "Tsugaru Kaikyō Fuyugeshiki". The song is about a young woman who has left a lover behind in Tokyo and is thinking back on them as she disembarks from a train at the station and prepares to board a ferry boat to Hokkaido.

== See also ==
- List of railway stations in Japan
