= Twilight Express =

Japanese overnight train service

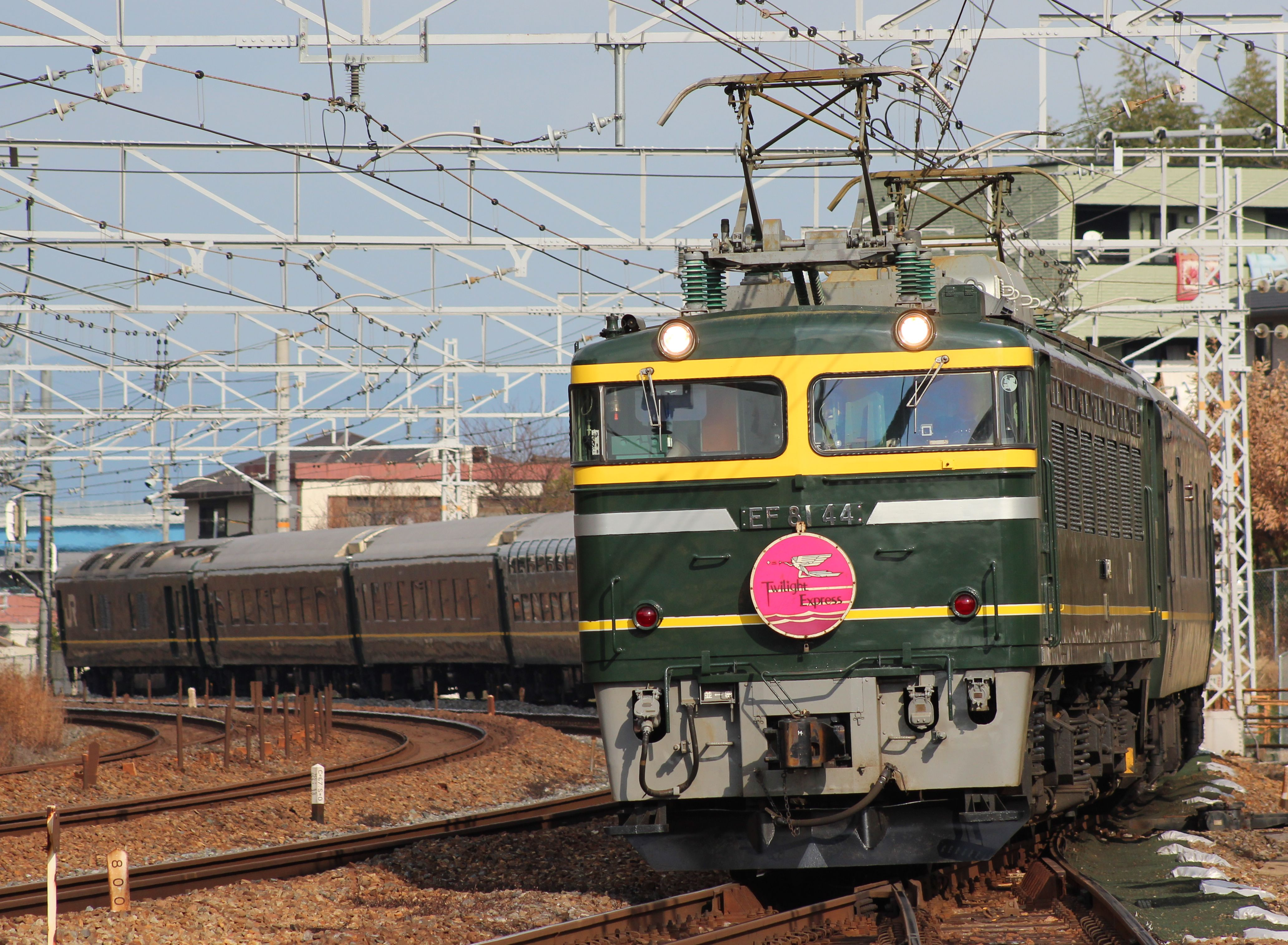
- The Twilight Express hauled by an EF81 electric locomotive in January 2013

Overview
- Service type: Limited express
- Status: Discontinued
- Locale: Japan
- First service: July 1989
- Last service: March 2016
- Successor: Twilight Express Mizukaze
- Former operator(s): JR West

Route
- Termini: Osaka; Sapporo
- Distance travelled: approx. 1,500 km (930 mi)
- Average journey time: 22-23 hours

Technical
- Rolling stock: 24 series sleeping cars
- Track gauge: 1,067 mm (3 ft 6 in)
- Electrification: 1,500 V DC / 20 kV AC
- Operating speed: 110 km/h (70 mph)

The Twilight Express (トワイライトエクスプレス, Towairaitoekusupuresu) was a limited express sleeping car train service operated by West Japan Railway Company (JR West) in Japan from 1989 until March 2015. It ran between the city of Sapporo on the northern island of Hokkaido and Osaka in south-western Honshu, a distance of approximately 1,500 km (930 mi), with the journey taking between 22 and 23 hours. From May 2015 until March 2016, the train operated as a luxury cruise train between Osaka and Shimonoseki in western Japan.

== Overview ==
Trains for Sapporo departed Osaka at 12:00, calling at Shin-Osaka, Kyoto, Tsuruga, Fukui, Kanazawa, Takaoka, Toyama, Naoetsu, and Nagaoka, with the final passenger pick-up made at in then at Niitsu at 19:31. The first stop in Hokkaido was at Tōya at 07:18. The train then made four more stops before arriving at Sapporo at 09:02.

The same stops were made in the reverse, with the Twilight Express departing Sapporo at 14:05 and making its final pickup at Tōya at 16:33. The first stop at Niitsu was made at 04:33, with the train eventually making its way to Kyoto at 12:15 and finally arriving at Osaka at 12:52.

The Twilight Express consisted of type "A" and "B" accommodations, all specific to this particular train. A flat fee was charged for all berths, regardless of starting or ending location. The other fares, the basic fare and limited express fare, were based on distance. For tourists using the Japan Rail Pass, the basic fare did not have to be paid, although the limited express fare and room fare had to be paid.

Trains departed several times per week, with more departures during holiday periods. The Nihonkai train made daily round-trip runs between Osaka and Aomori, with ongoing connections to Sapporo.

From 16 May 2015, the train became a luxury cruise train operating on a weekly basis between Osaka and Shimonoseki in the west of Japan, taking approximately 29 hours for the 829 km journey. This service operated until March 2016.

== Route ==
The Twilight Express ran on the following lines:

West Japan Railway Company (JR West)

- JR Kyoto Line (Tokaido Main Line), Osaka - Yamashina
- Kosei Line, Yamashina - Omi-Shiotsu
- Hokuriku Main Line, Omi-Shiotsu - Naoetsu

East Japan Railway Company (JR East)

- Shinetsu Main Line, Naoetsu - Niitsu
- Uetsu Main Line, Niitsu - Akita
- Ou Main Line, Akita - Aomori Signal^{1}

Hokkaido Railway Company (JR Hokkaido)

- Tsugaru Kaikyō Line, Aomori Signal - Kanita^{2} - Goryōkaku^{1}
- Hakodate Main Line, Goryōkaku - Oshamambe
- Muroran Main Line, Oshamambe - Numanohata
- Chitose Line, Numanohata - Shiroishi
- Hakodate Main Line, Shiroishi - Sapporo

^{1}Train reversal point
^{2}Crew change location for conductors (JR West and JR Hokkaido)

The Tsugaru Kaikyō Line runs over the tracks of the Tsugaru Line, Kaikyō Line, Esashi Line, and Hakodate Main Line.

== Formations ==
=== July 1989 - December 1989 ===
The original charter train formation operating from 21 July 1989 was as follows. The view from inside the "royal suite" in car 8 was obstructed by the adjacent generator van.

Car No.	1	2	3	4	5	6	7	8	
Numbering	SuRoNeFu 25-502	SuShi 24-2	OHa 25-552	OHaNeFu 25-501	OHaNe 25-562	OHaNe 25-561	OHa 25-551	SuRoNeFu 25-501	KaNi 24-12
Facilities	A-type suite and compartments	Dining car	Lounge car /Showers	B-type compartments	B-type compartments	B-type compartments	Lounge car /Showers	A-type suite and compartments	Generator van

=== December 1989 - July 1990 ===
From 2 December 1989, trains were formed as follows.

Car No.	1	2	3	4	5	6	7	8	
Numbering	SuRoNeFu 25-500	SuShi 24	OHa 25-550	OHaNe 25-520	OHaNe 25-520	OHaNe 25-510	OHaNe 25-560	OHaNeFu 25-500	KaNi 24
Facilities	A-type suite and compartments	Dining car	Lounge car /Showers	B-type compartments	B-type compartments	B-type compartments + mini lounge	B-type compartments	B-type compartments	Generator van

=== July 1990 - March 2015 ===
From 20 July 1990, trains were lengthened to nine cars (plus a generator van), and formed as shown below.

Car No.	1	2	3	4	5	6	7	8	9	
Numbering	SuRoNeFu 25-500	SuRoNe 25-500	SuShi 24	OHa 25-550	OHaNe 25-520	OHaNe 25-520	OHaNe 25-510	OHaNe 25-560	OHaNeFu 25-500	KaNi 24
Facilities	A-type suite and compartments	A-type suite and compartments	Dining car	Lounge car /Showers	B-type compartments	B-type compartments	B-type compartments + mini lounge	B-type couchettes	B-type couchettes	Generator van

=== May 2015 - March 2016 ===
From May 2015, the following formation was used for cruise train services. The "OHaNeFu 25" car was not used by passengers on these services.

Car No.	1	2	3	4	5	6	7	
Numbering	SuRoNeFu 25-500	SuRoNe 25-500	SuRoNe 25-500	SuRoNe 25-500	OHa 25-550	SuShi 24	OHaNeFu 25-500	KaNi 24
Facilities	A-type suite and compartments	A-type suite and compartments	A-type suite and compartments	A-type suite and compartments	Lounge car /Showers	Dining car	B-type couchettes	Generator van

== Rolling stock ==
=== Locomotives ===
Three types of locomotives were used to haul the Twilight Express service:

- Osaka to Aomori: JR West Class EF81 AC/DC electric locomotive assigned to Fukui Depot
- Aomori to Goryōkaku: JR Hokkaido Class ED79 AC electric locomotive assigned to Hakodate Depot
- Goryōkaku to Sapporo: JR Hokkaido Class DD51 diesel locomotives assigned to Hakodate Depot (double-headed)

As of October 2014, five specially-liveried Class EF81 locomotives were assigned for Twilight Express duties, numbers EF81 43, 44, 103, 113, and 114. Locomotive number EF81 104 was also formerly used on Twilight Express services, but was withdrawn in 2013.

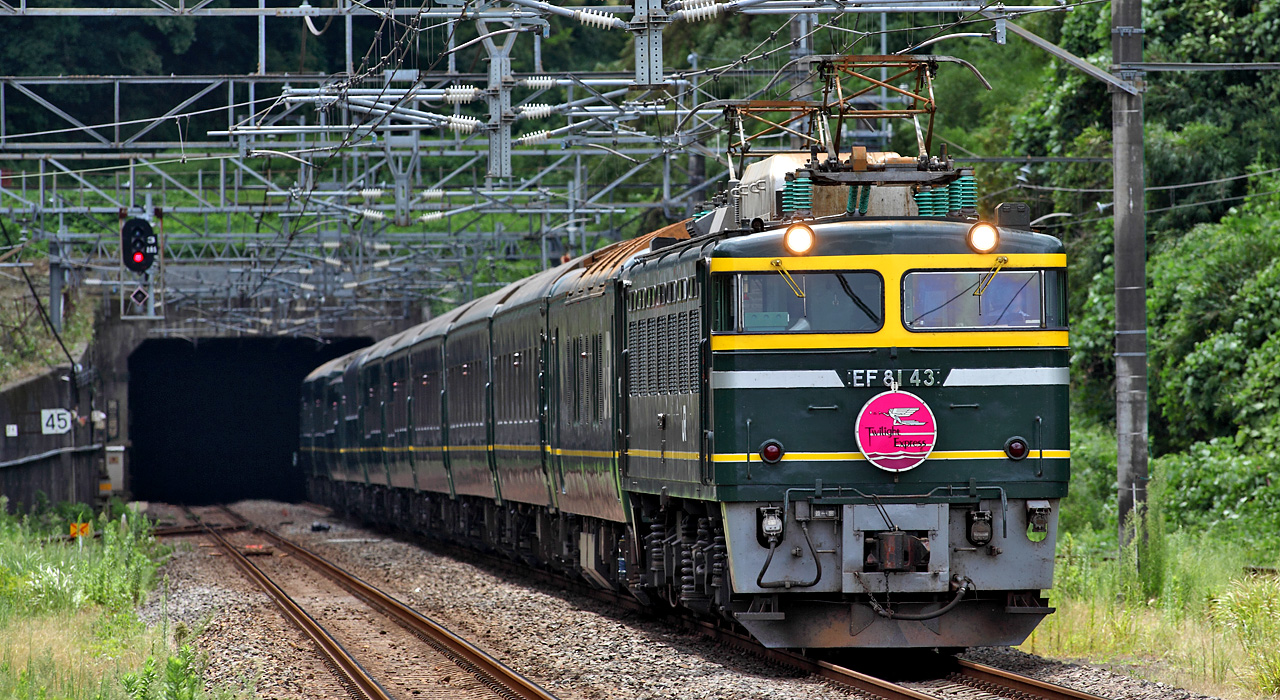
A Twilight Express service hauled by a JR West Class EF81 electric locomotive in August 2009

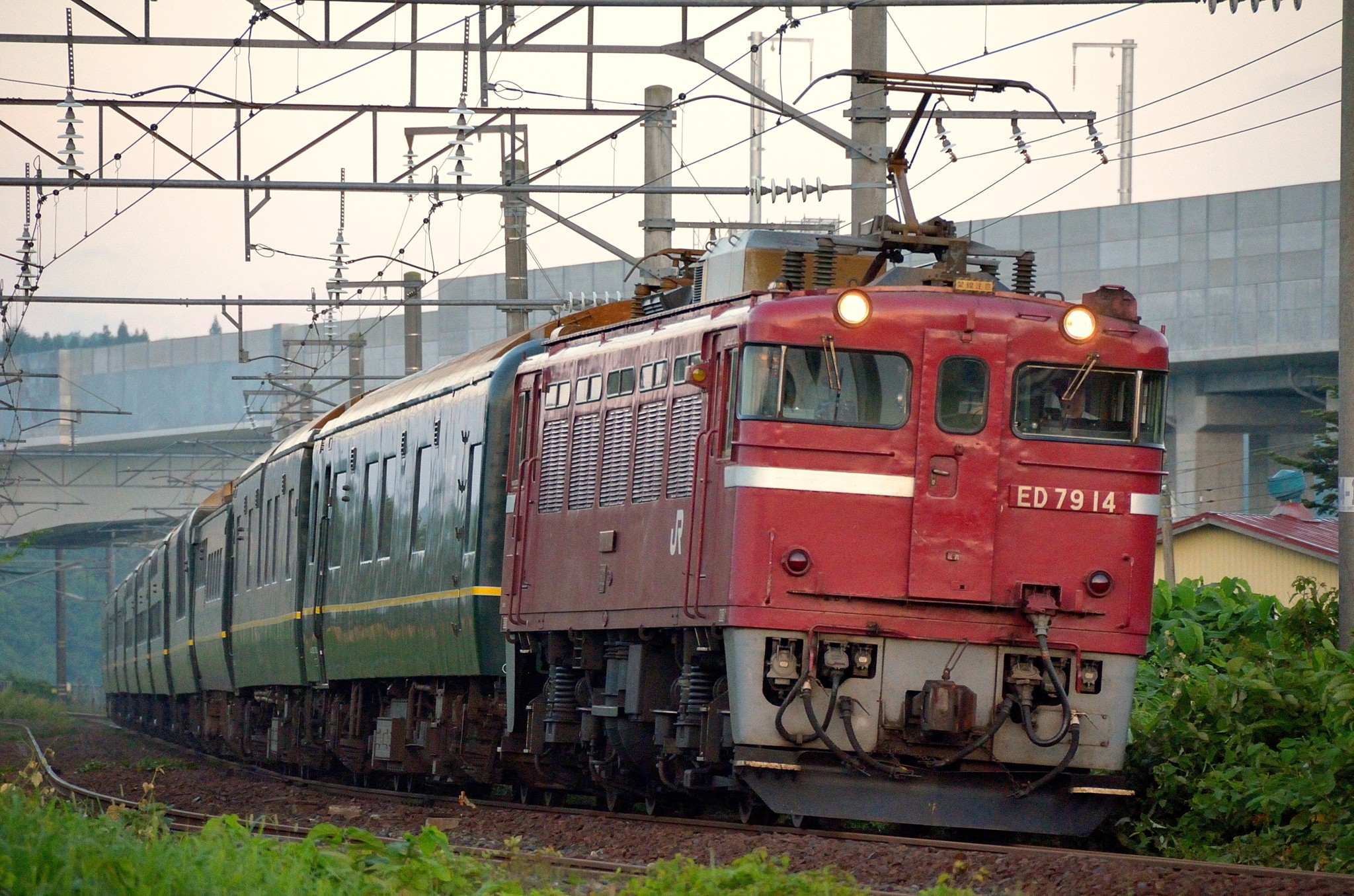
A Twilight Express service hauled by a JR Hokkaido Class ED79 electric locomotive in July 2013

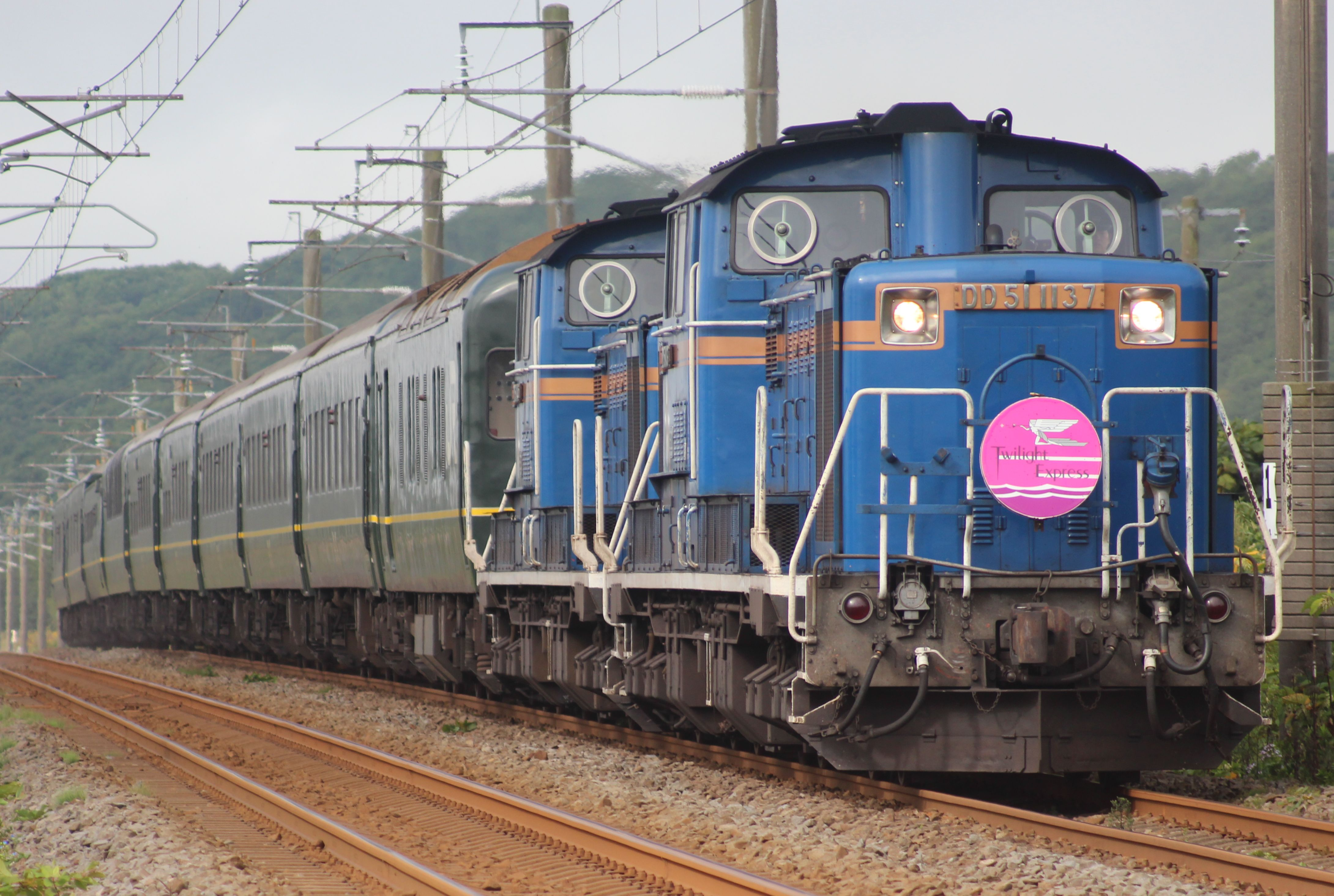
A Twilight Express service hauled by two Class DD51 diesel locomotives in Hokkaido in September 2012

=== Coaches ===
As of October 2014, three 9-car 24 series trainsets were used on Twilight Express services, formed as follows. The former coach numbers and conversion dates are shown below the current running numbers.

Car No.	1	2	3	4	5	6	7	8	9
Set 1	SuRoNeFu 25 501	SuRoNe 25 501	SuShi 24 1	OHa 25 551	OHaNe 25 523	OHaNe 25 523	OHaNe 25 511	OHaNe 25 561	OHaNeFu 25 501
Set 1	(OHaNe 25 87 / 1989)	(OHaNe 25 52 / 1990)	(SaShi 489-3 / 1988)	(OHaNe 15 38 / 1989)	(OHaNe 25 43 / 1989)	(OHaNe 25 50 / 1989)	(OHaNe 25 40 / 1989)	(OHaNe 25 69 / 1989)	(OHaNeFu 25 34 / 1989)
Set 2	SuRoNeFu 25 502	SuRoNe 25 502	SuShi 24 2	OHa 25 552	OHaNe 25 524	OHaNe 25 521	OHaNe 25 512	OHaNe 25 562	OHaNeFu 25 502
Set 2	(OHaNe 25 89 / 1989)	(OHaNe 25 52 / 1990)	(SaShi 489-4 / 1988)	(OHaNe 15 39 / 1989)	(OHaNe 25 55 / 1989)	(OHaNe 25 39 / 1989)	(OHaNe 25 51 / 1990)	(OHaNe 25 86 / 1989)	(OHaNeFu 25 41 / 1989)
Set 3	SuRoNeFu 25 503	SuRoNe 25 503	SuShi 24 3	OHa 25 553	OHaNe 25 525	OHaNe 25 526	OHaNe 25 513	OHaNe 25 563	OHaNeFu 25 503
Set 3	(OHaNe 25 44 / 1991)	(OHaNe 25 62 / 1991)	(SaShi 481-53 / 1988)	(OHaNe 14 8 / 1991)	(OHaNe 25 59 / 1991)	(OHaNe 25 47 / 1991)	(OHaNe 25 67 / 1991)	(OHaNe 25 80 / 1991)	(OHaNeFu 25 45 / 1991)

Four generator vans, numbered "KaNi 24 10, 12, 13, and 14", were used with the Twilight Express trainsets.

== Timetable ==
The train timetable as of March 2011 was as follows. For the Osaka departure to Sapporo, read down. For the Sapporo departure to Osaka, read up. Stations that were not used for passenger pick-up or drop-off are in italics.

Down	Station name	Up
Dep 11:50 (Track 10) ↓	Ōsaka	Arr 12:52 (Track 3) ↑
Arr 11:55 (Track 12); Dep 11:56	Shin-Ōsaka	Dep 12:48 (Track 17); Arr 12:47
Arr 12:24 (Track 0); Dp 12:25	Kyoto	Dep 12:18 (Track 7); Ar 12:15
Arr 13:46; Dep 13:48	Tsuruga	Dep 10:52; Arr 10:36
Arr 14:40 (Track 1); Dep 14:40	Fukui	Dep 09:56 (Track 5); Arr 09:54
Arr 15:37 (Track 7); Dep 15:40	Kanazawa	Dep 08:51 (Track 1); Arr 08:49
Arr 16:14; Dep 16:14	Takaoka	Dep 08:18; Arr 08:18
Arr 16:30 (Track 6); Dep 16:31	Toyama	Dep 08:03 (Track 3); Arr 08:01
17:28	Itoigawa	06:58
Arr 17:57; Dep 17:59	Naoetsu	Dep 06:27; Arr 06:25
Arr 18:56; Dep 18:58	Nagaoka	Dep 05:29; Arr 05:17
Arr 19:37; Dep 19:39	Niitsu	Dep 04:40; Arr 04:33
20:14	Nakajō	↑
20:41	Echigo-Hayakawa	3:29
21:50	Fujishima	↑
22:07	Sakata	02:04
23:51	Akita	00:34
01:24	Ōdate	23:04
02:05	Hirosaki	22:27
↓	Tsugaru-Shinjō	21:56
↓	Aomori Signal (near Aomori Station); Train reversal point	↑
03:19	Kanita; Crew change station for conductors JR West <> JR Hokkaido	20:38
↓ Enter 03:41; Exit 04:20 ↓	Seikan Tunnel	↑ Exit 20:17; Enter 19:41 ↑
05:05	Goryōkaku; Train reversal point	18:43
↓	Oshamambe	17:05
Arr 07:18; Dep 07:18	Tōya	Dep 16:33; Arr 16:23
Arr 07:52; Dep 07:54	Higashi-Muroran	Dep 15:50; Arr 15:48
Arr 08:11; Dep 08:12	Noboribetsu	Dep 15:34; Arr 15:33
Arr 08:50; Dep 08:50	Tomakomai	Dep 15:00; Arr 14:59
Arr 09:10; Dep 09:11	Minami-Chitose	Dep 14:39; Arr 14:39
↓ Arr 09:52 (Track 3)	Sapporo	↑ Dep 14:05 (Track 4)
Down	Station name	Up

== History ==
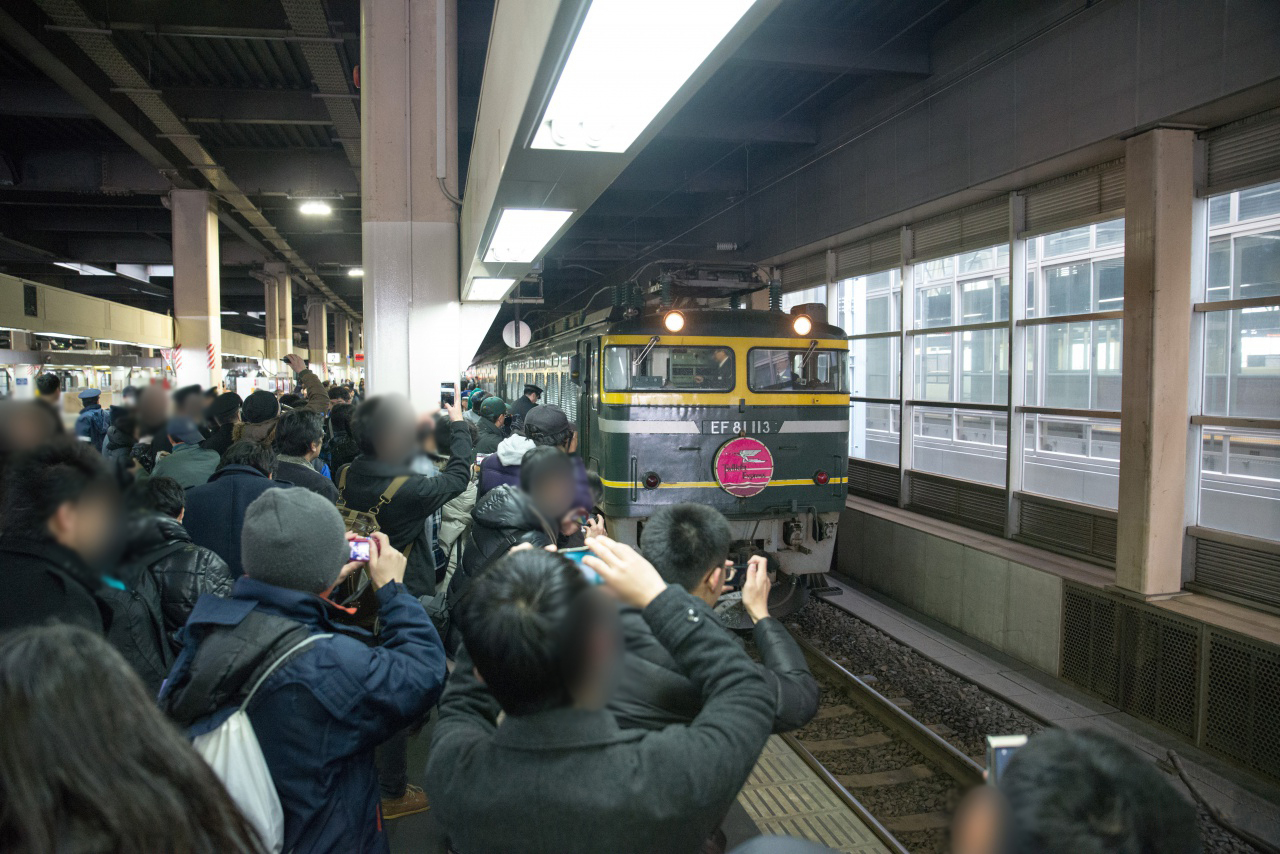
The final regular up service at Kanazawa Station on 13 March 2015

The Twilight Express first ran on 18 July 1989 from Osaka to Sapporo and back as a special preview run for invited passengers. From 21 July, it began operating as a charter service. A second rake of coaches was introduced from December 1989, allowing operation as a seasonal service. "A"-type sleeping cars were added to the formations between 1990 and 1991, and the formations were extended to 10 cars (including generator car). In April 1991, a third rake of coaches was introduced, allowing daily operations during busy seasons. The coaches underwent a program of interior refurbishment between 2001 and 2002.

=== Withdrawal ===
Twilight Express services were discontinued from March 2015, with the final services departing from both Osaka and Sapporo on 12 March, arriving at their destinations the following day.

=== Special Twilight Express cruise train ===
From 16 May 2015, the train became a luxury cruise train named the Special Twilight Express (特別なトワイライトエクスプレス) operating on a weekly basis between Osaka and Shimonoseki in the west of Japan. This operated until March 2016, with the last service departing from Osaka on 19 March, returning on 22 March.

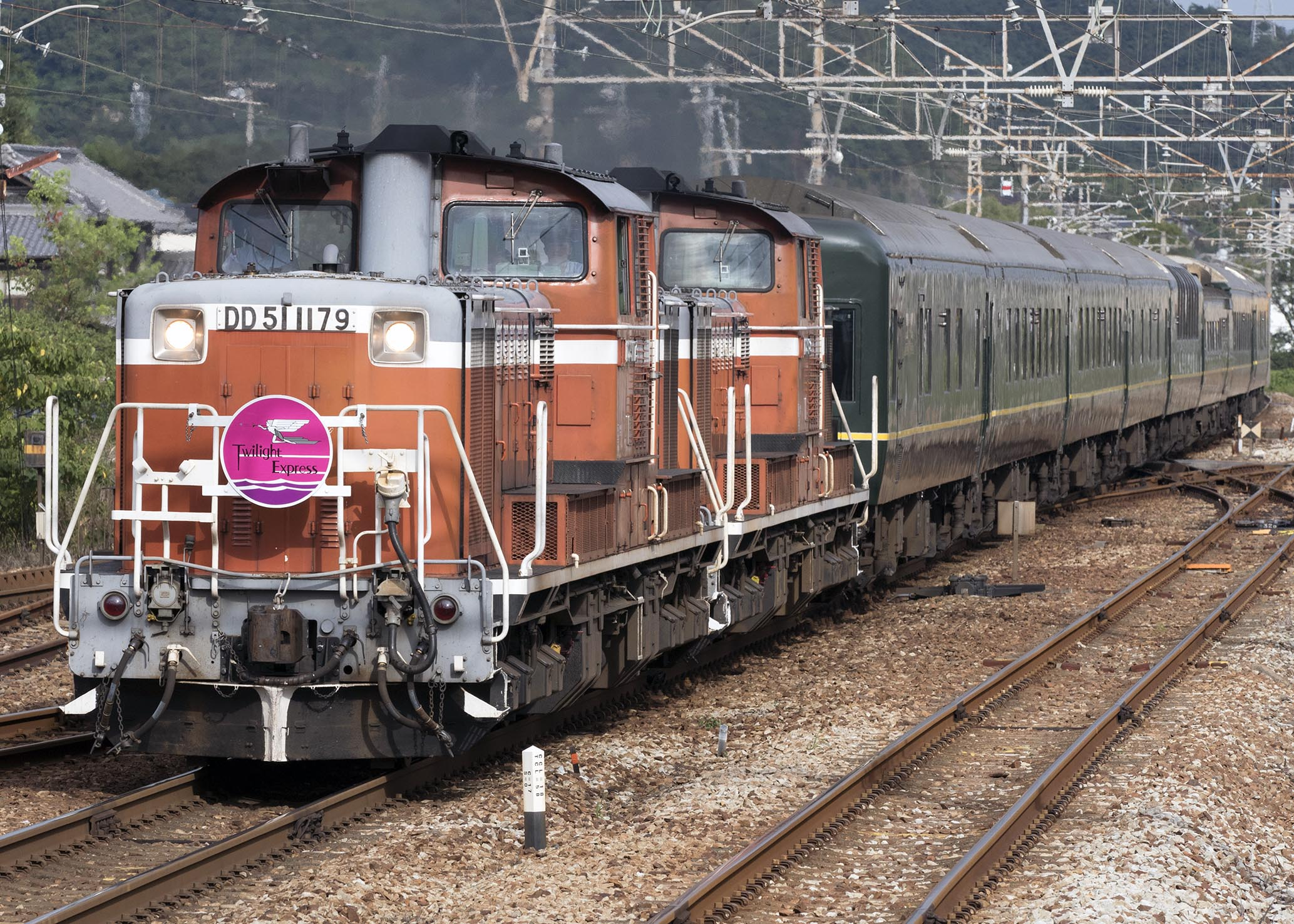
A Special Twilight Express cruise train hauled by a pair of Class DD51 diesel locomotives in September 2015

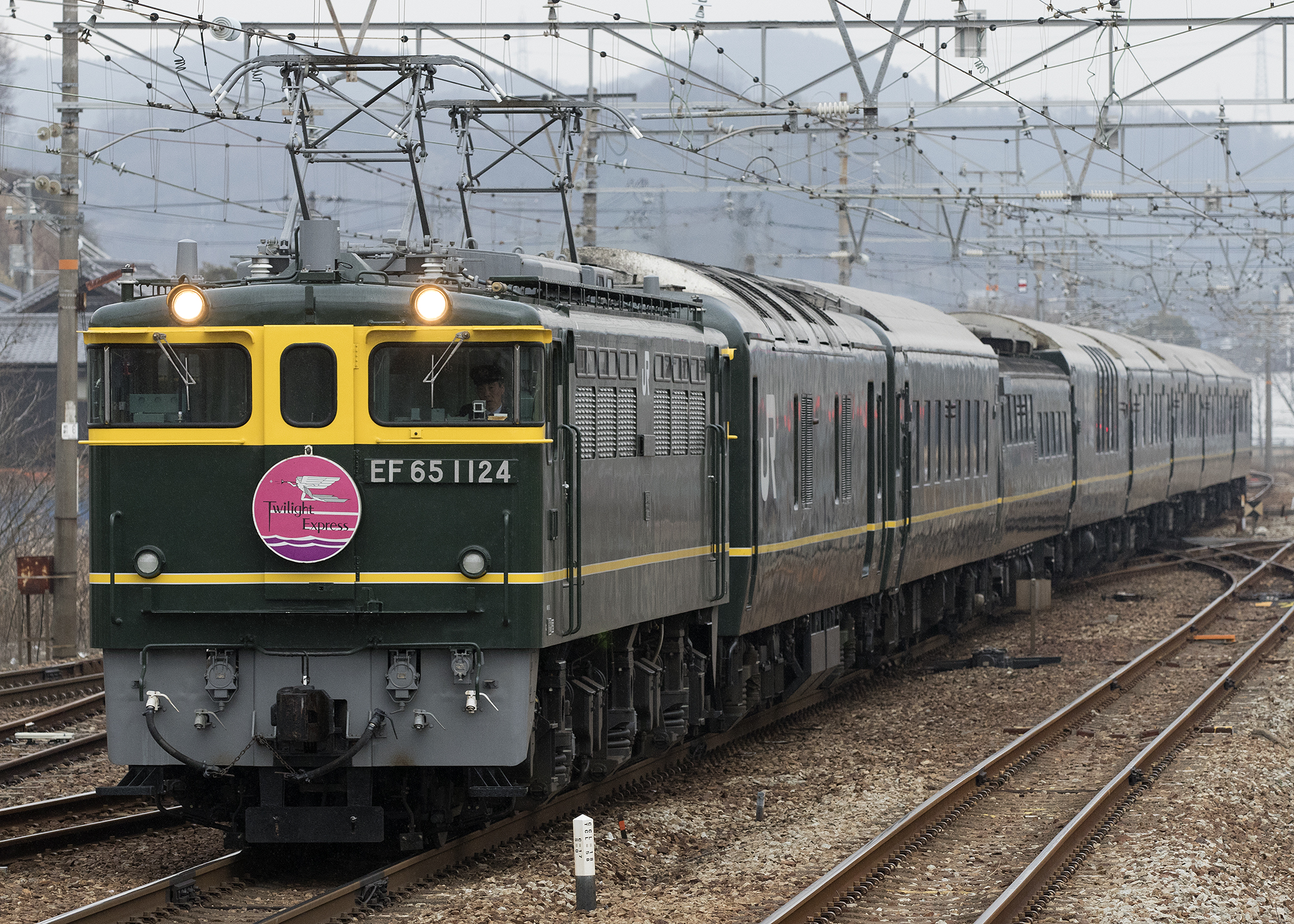
A Special Twilight Express cruise train hauled by specially reliveried electric locomotive EF65 1124 in February 2016

== Future developments ==
In June 2017, JR West introduced a new luxury sleeping-car excursion train named Twilight Express Mizukaze, continuing the name and brand established by the Twilight Express train service.

== Preservation ==
Former Twilight Express Class EF81 electric locomotive EF81 103 is exhibited at the Kyoto Railway Museum, which opened in April 2016, together with four former Twilight Express 24 series coaches, sleeping car SuRoNeFu 25-501, dining car SuShi 24-1, lounge car OHa 25-551, and generator van KaNi 24-12.

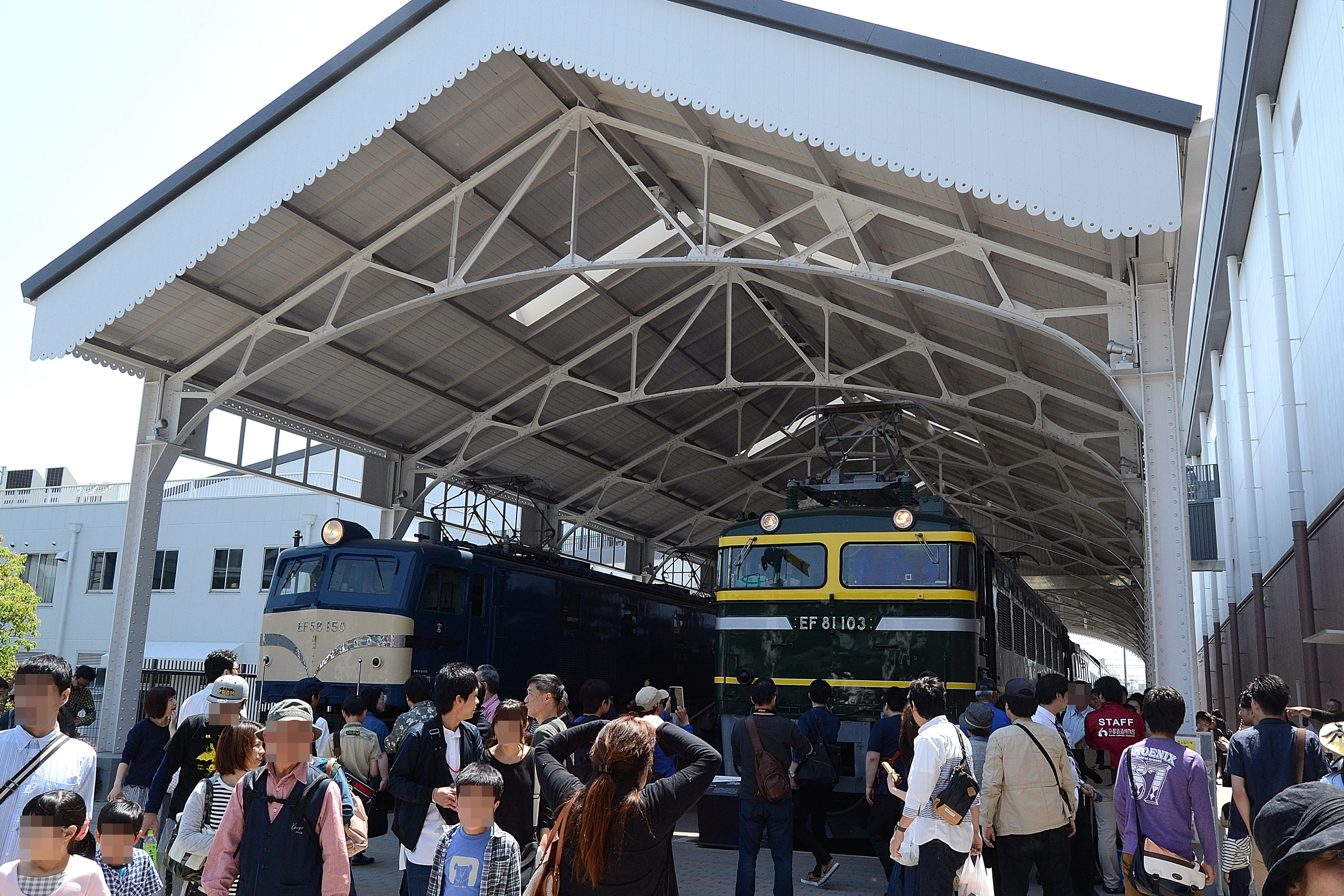
Twilight Express EF81 103 (right) in the Twilight Plaza zone at the Kyoto Railway Museum in May 2016

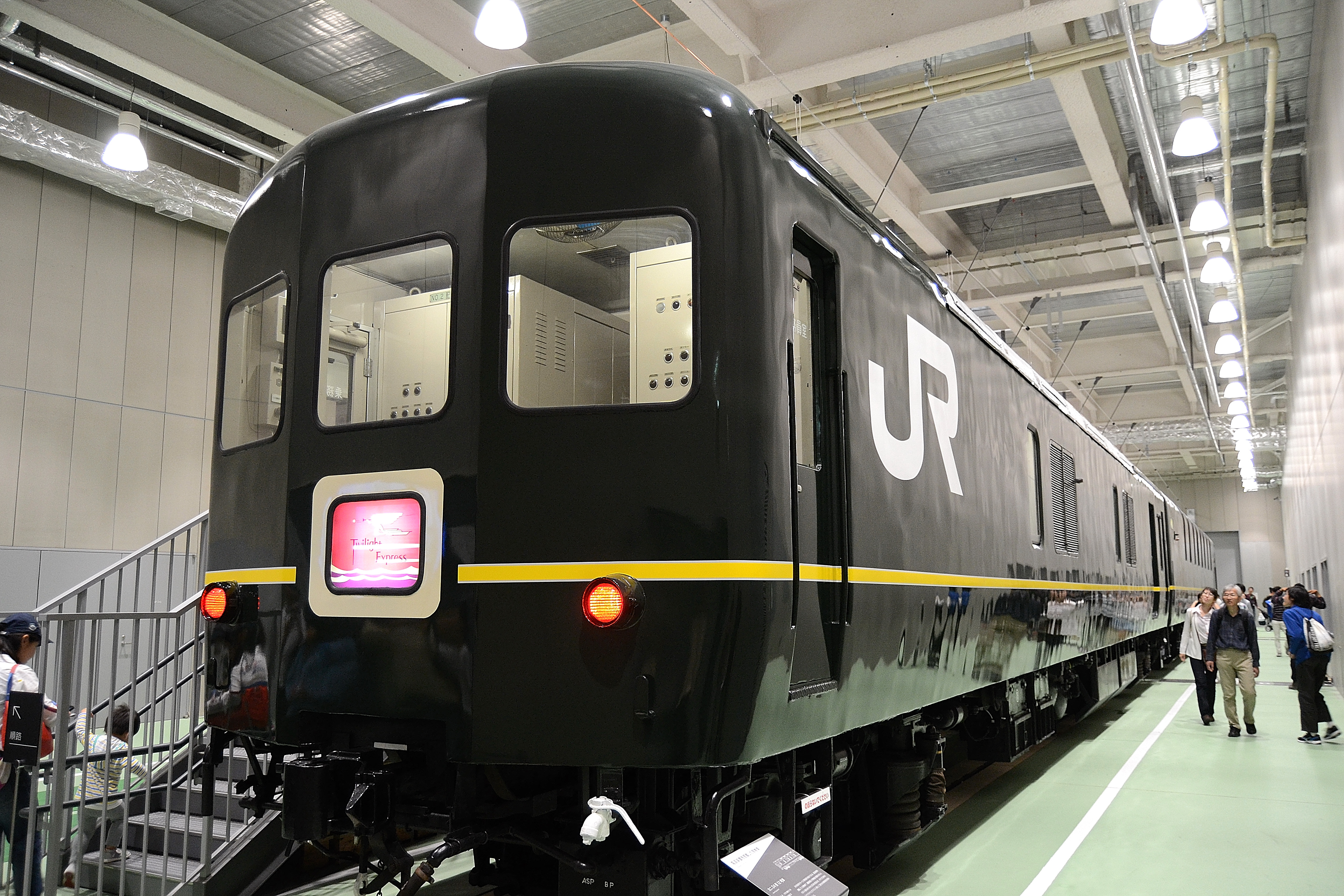
Former Twilight Express generator van KaNi 24-12 and lounge car OHa 25-551 in the Main Hall at the Kyoto Railway Museum in May 2016

== In popular culture ==
The Twilight Express formed the main backdrop for the TBS TV drama Terminus: Love on the Twilight Express (終着駅-トワイライトエクスプレスの恋), starring Kōichi Satō and Miho Nakayama, and broadcast on 20 March 2012.

The Twilight Express's dining car was featured in Chapters 41 an 42 of Ekiben Hitoritabi, a manga about ekiben.

== See also ==
- List of named passenger trains of Japan
