= Ekiben Hitoritabi =

Seinen manga series

駅弁ひとり旅
- Genre: Gourmet
- Manga

Ekiben Hitoritabi
- Written by: Jun Hayase
- Published by: Futabasha
- Magazine: Manga Action
- Original run: 2006 – November 15, 2011
- Volumes: 15
- Television drama

Ekiben Hitoritabi
- Original network: Fuji TV
- Original run: April 5, 2012 – June 21, 2012
- Episodes: 12

Ekiben Hitoritabi (駅弁ひとり旅; "Train Lunch Solo Journey") is a seinen manga series by Jun Hayase, serialized in Manga Action. It focuses on the main character, Nakahara Daisuke, as he eats ekiben, bento meals sold at train stations, as he travels around Japan by rail.

A 12-episode live-action television series adaptation aired between April 5 and June 21, 2012.

== Plot ==
Nakahara Daisuke is the owner of a bento shop in Tokyo and a densha otaku. For their tenth wedding anniversary, his wife gives him a train ticket for traveling across Japan since he has not had a chance to travel since their honeymoon. She tells him to investigate ekiben recipes along the way to help improve the bento in their shop. Although the trip is intended to be a solo one, Daisuke often befriends other travellers along the way and shares information about trains, railway history, ekiben, meibutsu, and local landmarks.

At each stop Daisuke or one of his fellow travellers buys an eki-bento (ekiben), and one full page is devoted to an image of the just-opened container with all components labelled; subsequent frames highlight the history and flavors. A related theme is the "romance of train travel".

== Major characters ==
In order of appearance:

- Nakahara Daisuke – the main character, a densha otaku and ekiben enthusiast
- Nakahara Yuko – Daisuke's wife who bought his ticket and sent him on a multiweek trip around Japan
- Ozaki Nana – a journalist for a travel magazine who Daisuke befriends and instructs about ekiben
- Mizukoshi Miki – a law student who has failed the bar exam three times who Daisuke takes under his wing and instructs about sightseeing and ekiben
- Mizukoshi Hiroshi – Miki's nephew, who Daisuke helps fulfill a promise made with his deceased father to ride the Yamaguchi Line steam locomotive and see the Amarube Viaduct
- Kate – an Australian exchange student traveling alone on her summer break

== Volumes ==
Each volume of the manga focuses on a different region of Japan as Daisuke travels from station to station, viewing the local sights and eating tokusanhin in famous ekiben.

No.	Release date	ISBN
1	April 20, 2006	978-4575832273
1. Tokyo Station – Kiwamestuki Bento; 2. Yokohama Station – Shūmai Bento; 3. Tokuyama Station – Anago-Meshi/Shimonoseki Station – Fuku Sushi; 4. Moji Station – Mentaiko Bento; 5. Oita Station – Bungo Saba Zushi; 6. Nobeoka Station – Ayu Sushi; 7. Miyazaki Station – Shiitake Rice/Miyakonojo Station – Kashima Rice/Kagoshima-chuo Station – Tonkotsu Bento; 8. Kareigawa Station: Karei River of the One Hundred Year Journey Story; 9. Hitoyoshi Station – Kuri Rice/Shin-Yatsushiro Station – Ayuyasandai; 10. Kumamoto Station – Tonasama Bento/Tosu Station – Shaomai Bento; 11. Nagasaki Station – Shippoku Bento, Braised Pork Bento/Sasebo Station – Hirado Nanban Ago Bento; 12. Hakata Station – Flavors of Kyushu, Genkai Chirashi/Yufuin no Mori Train Vendor – Yufuin no Mori Bento
Nakahara Daisuke is the owner of a bento shop in Tokyo and a densha otaku, train enthusiast. For their tenth wedding anniversary, his wife gives him a train ticket for traveling across Japan since he has not had a chance to travel since their honeymoon. She tells him to investigate ekiben recipes along the way to help improve the bento in their shop. Daisuke meets Ozaki Nana, a travel journalist who has neglected to pack food, on an overnight train and befriends her by sharing his ekiben. This volume focuses on ekiben in Kyushu.
2	September 28, 2006	978-4575832853
13. Matsuyama Station – Shoyu Rice / Imabari Station – Seto-No-Oshizushi; 14. Uwajima Station – Ekiben; 15. Kochi Station – Lightly-Roasted Bonito Bento, Bonito Rice; 16. Tokushima Station – Awa Chicken Bento; 17. Anpanman Bento; 18. Takamatsu Station – Sawara Sushi Shikoru Pilgrim Bento; 19. Okayama Station – Gift-use Matsuri-zushi; 20. Yonago Station – Gozaemon-zushi (Mackerel), Gyu-ben; 21. Matsue Station – Gokigen Bento, Yamato Shijimi No Moguri-zushi; 22. Izumoshi Station – Handmade Soba Bento; 23. Masuda Station – Sazae Rice/Shin-Yamaguchi Station – Railway Legend; 24. Miyajimaguchi Station – Anago Rice; 25. Hiroshima Station – Seto Jako Rice/Mihara Station – Original Tako Rice/Fukuyama Station – Fukuyama Bara-zushi; 26. Tottori Station – Squid Ink Bento, Kuro Rice
While staying at Dogo Onsen, Daisuke encounters Mizukoshi Miki who has failed the bar exam three times. She is on a rapid style Shikoku Pilgrimage, aiming to visit 10 out of the 88 sites in three days. Daisuke convinces her to slow down and enjoy the sights and ekiben with him. Through Miki, Daisuke meets her nephew, Hiroshi. Hiroshi's recently deceased father promised take him to ride the Yamaguchi Line steam locomotive and see the Amarube Viaduct during his upcoming school break. Daisuke volunteers to take Daisuke instead. Together they sightsee and enjoy ekiben, allowing Hiroshi to find closure. This volume focuses on ekiben in the Chūgoku region of Honshu and Shikoku.
3	April 28, 2007	978-4575833522
27. Toyooka Station – Crab Sushi, Wicker Basket Bento; 28. Wadayama Station – Tajima Country Japanese Beef Bento/Himeji Station – Oh! Wanna Eat Red Sea Bream; 29. Banshu-Ako Station – Shako Rice, Horoyoi Chushingura; 30. Nishi-Akashi Station – Hippari Dako Rice; 31. Kōbe Station – Kobe Wine Bento, Kobe Chinese Seafood Restaurant; 32. Osaka Station – Torato Bento, Boiled Sweetfish Sushi; 33. Kyoto Station – Delicious Lunch Western Bento, Eel Bed/Yoshinoguchi Station – Persimmon Leaf Sushi; 34. Wakayama Station – Kodai Suzume Zushi/Shirahama Station – Kishu Temari Bento; 35. Kii-Katsuura Station – Maguro Steak/Shingu Station and Kii-Katsuura Station – Nanki Whale Bento; 36. Matsusaka Station – Prime Matsusaka Beef Tenderloin Bento, Moo-Taro Bento; 37. Ujiyamada Station – Ise Bento, Abalone Bento; 38. Kameyama Station – Shigure Chazuke
At Kinosaki Onsen Daisuke meets Kate, an Australian exchange student traveling alone during her summer vacation. Daisuke teaches Kate about the joys of ekiben as they sightsee. This volume focuses on ekiben in the Kansai region of Honshu.
4	September 28, 2007	978-4575834062
39. Kusatsu Station – Manpuku Meshi, Awami Tenbin Bento; 40. Kanazawa Station – Kaganodachi Bento; 41. Twilight Express Dining Car – Dinner; 42. Twilight Express Dining Car – Breakfast; 43. Otaru Station – Hokkaitezuna, Otaru's Umino Kagataki; 44. Cassiopea train Dining Car – Kaiseki Gozen, French Cuisine; 45. Hakodate Station – Nishin Migaki Bento; 46. Mori Station – Squid Rice; 47. Oshamambe Station – Crab Rice, Mori Soba; 48. Touya Station – Touya Hokki Meshi, Bokoi Meshi; 49. New Chitose Airport Station – Gokujyo Sanshoku Chirashi, Rice Ball
Daisuke reunites briefly with Hiroshi to show him the Kyoto Railway Museum. Then Daisuke meets his wife, Yuko, to take a luxurious trip on the Twilight Express together. After sightseeing at the Sapporo Clock Tower, they visit the Otaru Transportation Museum. Yuko intends take the Cassiopea sleeper back to Ueno, but Daisuke is accidentally still onboard when the train departs the station, so they are able to share one last meal together before Daisuke disembarks at Hakodate Station. On his way to Oshamambe Daisuke runs into Nana again. This volume focuses on ekiben in southern Hokkaido.
5	March 28, 2008	978-4575834666
50. Tomakomai Station - Salmon Sushi, Ekiben Of The North; 51. Shizunai Station - Hidaka Tsubumeshi Bento; 52. Obihiro Station - Hot Pork Rice Bowl, Tonkachi Harvest Bento; 53. Ikeda Station - Wine Marinated Tokachi Steak Bento, Oyako Rapu; 54. Akkeshi Station - Kani Meshi, Hotate Bento; 55. Nemuro Station - Hanazaki Kanigama, Hanazakimeshi; 56. Kushiro Station - Taraba Sushi, Iwashi no Hokkaburi; 57. Mashu Station - Mashu Pork Rice Bowl; 58. Sapporo Station - DMV Trip Box; 59. Abashiri Station - Hotate Bento, Ohotsuku Zeitaku Zanmai; 60. Kitami Station - Scallop Rice Bowl, Kita no Season
This volume focuses on ekiben in eastern Hokkaido.
6	September 27, 2008	978-4575835366
This volume focuses on ekiben in northern Hokkaido and Sakhalin.
7	March 28, 2009	978-4575836028
This volume focuses on ekiben in the eastern Tōhoku region of Honshu.
8	August 28, 2009	978-4575836622
This volume focuses on ekiben in the western Tōhoku region of Honshu.
9	April 10, 2010	978-4575837513
10	July 12, 2010	978-4575837865
11	January 12, 2011	978-4575838558
12	April 28, 2011	978-4575838985
13	July 28, 2011	978-4575839326
14	October 28, 2011	978-4575839791
15	January 12, 2012	978-4575840124

== Ekiben competition ==
In 2011 Hanshin department store in Osaka partnered with Ekiben Hitoritabi to hold an ekiben competition in which 260 ekiben were rated to name the country's best.
