= Train Suite Shiki-shima =

Japanese hybrid diesel/electric luxury cruise train type

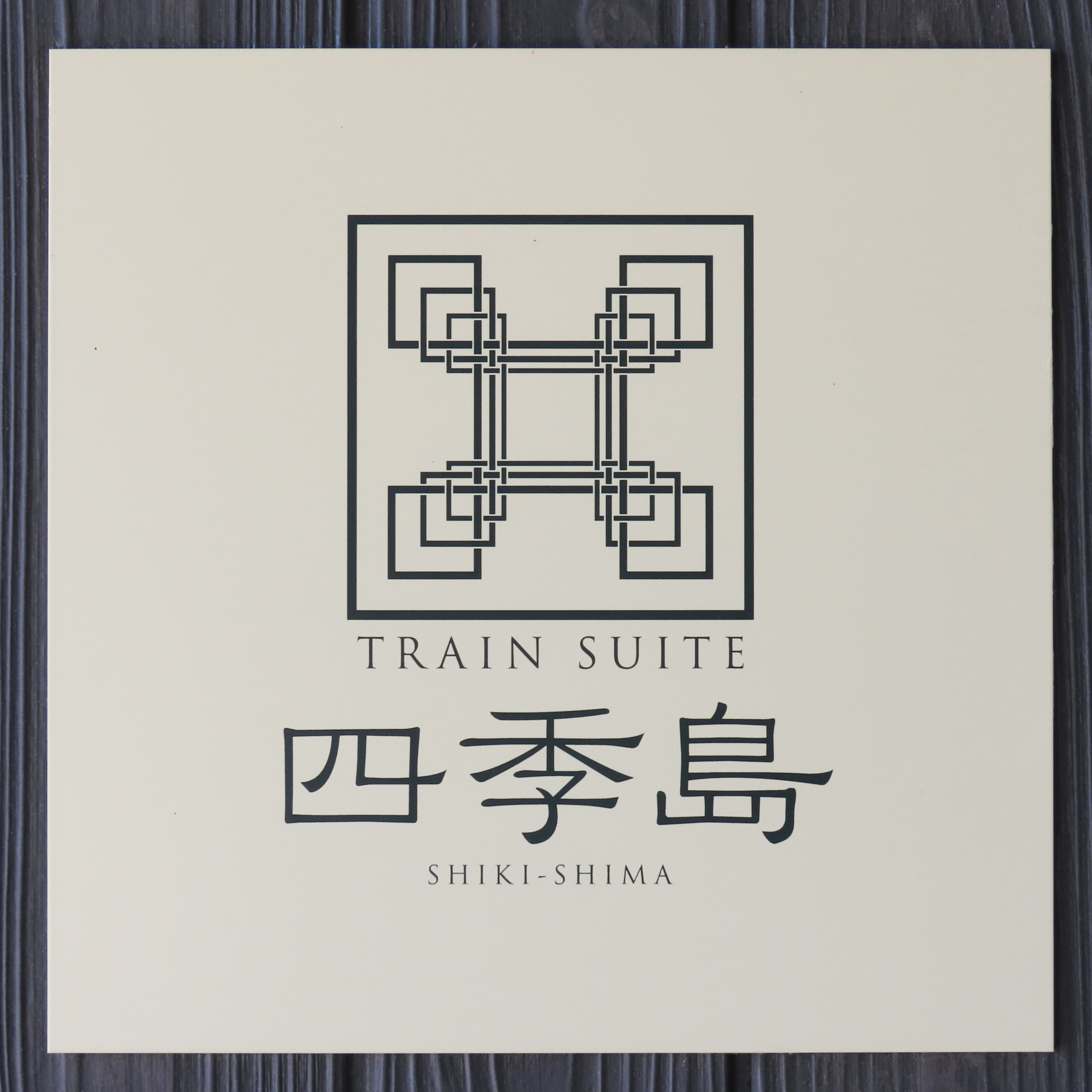
E001 series Train Suite Shiki-shima

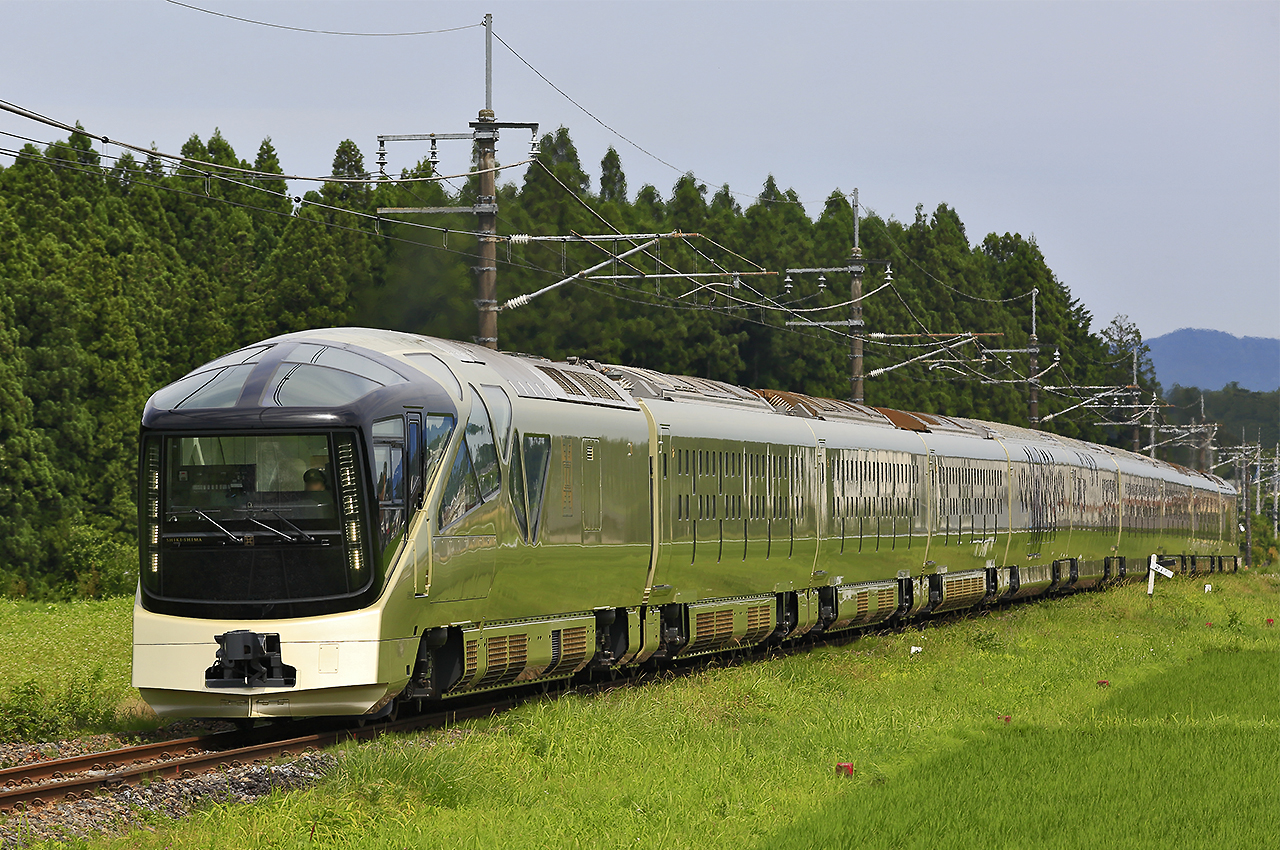
- The E001 series train on the Nikko Line in diesel mode in June 2017
- Stock type: Electric multiple unit/Diesel multiple unit
- In service: 2017–present
- Manufacturer: Kawasaki Heavy Industries/J-TREC
- Built at: Kobe/Yokohama
- Constructed: 2016
- Entered service: 1 May 2017
- Number built: 1 set (10 vehicles)
- Number in service: 1 set (10 vehicles)
- Formation: 10 cars per trainset
- Operator: JR East
- Depot: Oku

Specifications
- Car body construction: Stainless steel/aluminium
- Car length: 20,800 mm (68 ft 3 in)
- Width: 2,900 mm (9 ft 6 in)
- Height: 4,070 mm (13 ft 4 in)
- Maximum speed: 110 km/h (68 mph)
- Traction system: VVVF (IGBT)
- Acceleration: 1.5 km/(h⋅s) (0.93 mph/s)
- Deceleration: 3.6 km/(h⋅s) (2.2 mph/s)
- Current collection: PS37C pantographs
- Safety systems: ATC; ATS-P; ATS-PS; ATS-DN
- Track gauge: 1,067 mm (3 ft 6 in)

The E001 series (E001形), branded Train Suite Shiki-shima (TRAIN SUITE 四季島, Toran Suīto Shikishima; pronounced [toɾaɰ̃sɯiꜜːto ɕi̥kiɕima], French pronunciation: [tʁɛ̃ sɥit]) is a hybrid electric/diesel deluxe sleeping-car excursion train operated by the East Japan Railway Company (JR East) since 1 May 2017. The Train Suite Shiki-shima is one of the world's most exclusive and expensive trains.

== Design ==
The train uses an electric/diesel hybrid propulsion system, enabling the train to operate as an electric multiple unit under overhead electric wires or use two diesel generators in the end cars to power the train's traction motors on non-electrified routes.

Cars 1 to 4 and 8 to 10 were built by Kawasaki Heavy Industries in Kobe, while the three bilevel cars 5 to 7 were built by J-TREC in Yokohama. The Kawasaki-built cars have aluminium bodies, while the three J-TREC-built cars have stainless steel bodies.

The train styling and interior decoration of the train was overseen by industrial designer Ken Okuyama, and is advertised as using only the best quality materials and exemplifying traditional Japanese craftsmanship. Its overall design is reminiscent of the 251 series, also used by JR East.

== Train formation ==
The ten-coach train consists of six sleeping cars, a lounge car, a dining car, and observation cars at either end of the train. Five of the sleeping cars each have three private suite rooms, while one car (car 7) has two deluxe suites - a split-level "maisonette" type and a single-level "flat" type. The train formation is as shown below, formed of six motored ("M") cars and four non-powered trailer ("T") cars, and car 1 at the southern end. All suites have a shower and toilet. The two deluxe suites also each have a bathtub. One suite in car 4 is universal access. The entire train accommodates only 34 passengers.

| Car No. | 1 | 2 | 3 | 4 | 5 | 6 | 7 | 8 | 9 | 10 |
|---|---|---|---|---|---|---|---|---|---|---|
| Designation | M | | | T | | | | M | | |
| Numbering | E001-1 | E001-2 | E001-3 | E001-4 | E001-5 | E001-6 | E001-7 | E001-8 | E001-9 | E001-10 |
| Car type | Observation car | Sleeping car | | | Lounge | Dining car | Sleeping car | | | Observation car |
| Weight (t) | 64.1 | 55.4 | 51.3 | 49.5 | 44.6 | 50.1 | 50.5 | 51.8 | 55.4 | 63.9 |
| Capacity | 6 | | | | 18 | | 4 | 6 | | |
| Facilities | Diesel generator | 3 suites | | | Smoking Room | | 2 deluxe suites | 3 suites | | Diesel generator |
| Manufacturer | Kawasaki HI | | | | J-TREC | | | Kawasaki HI | | |

- Cars 2, 3, 8 and 9 are each fitted with a single-arm pantograph.
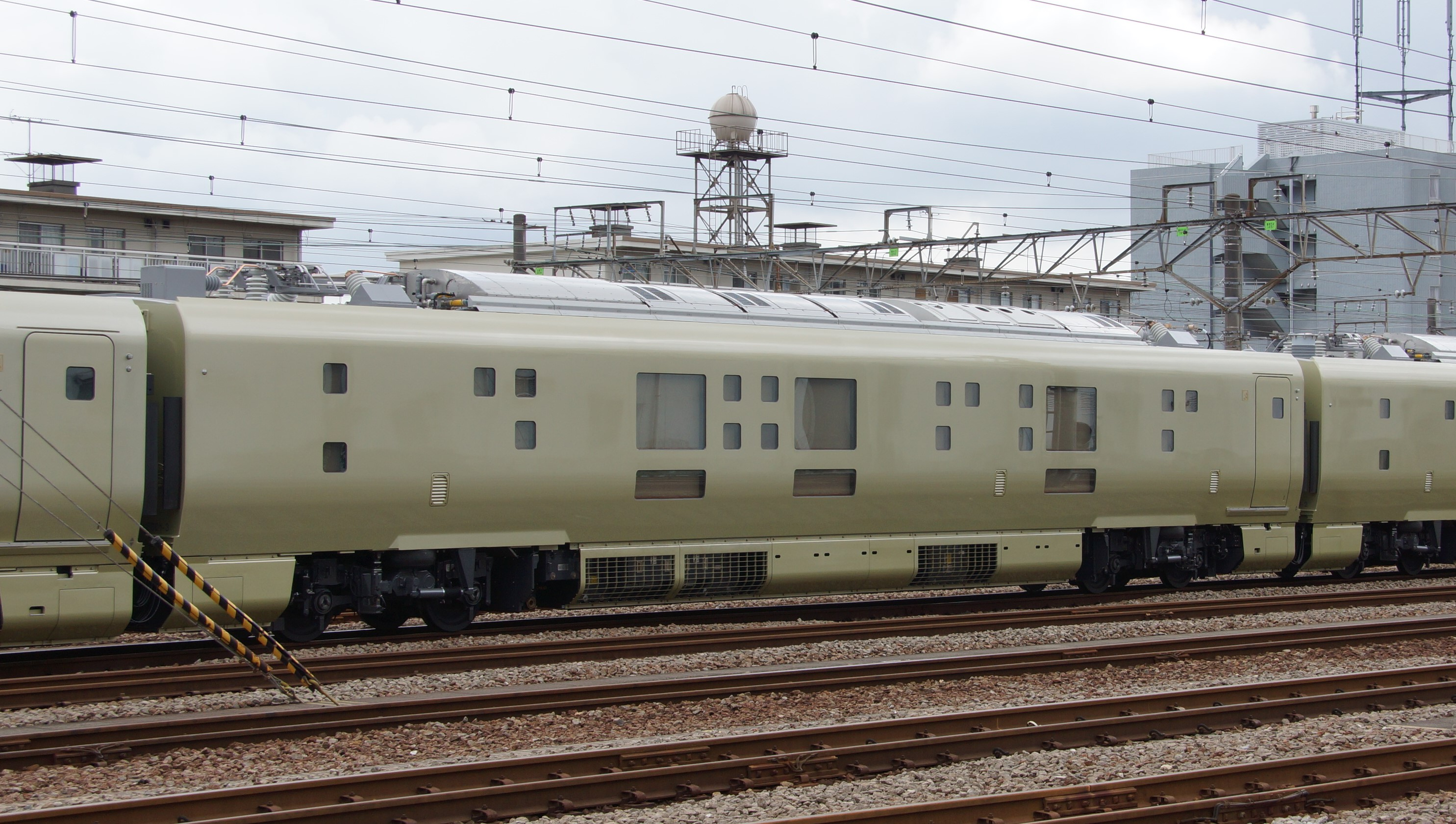
E001-3 in September 2016

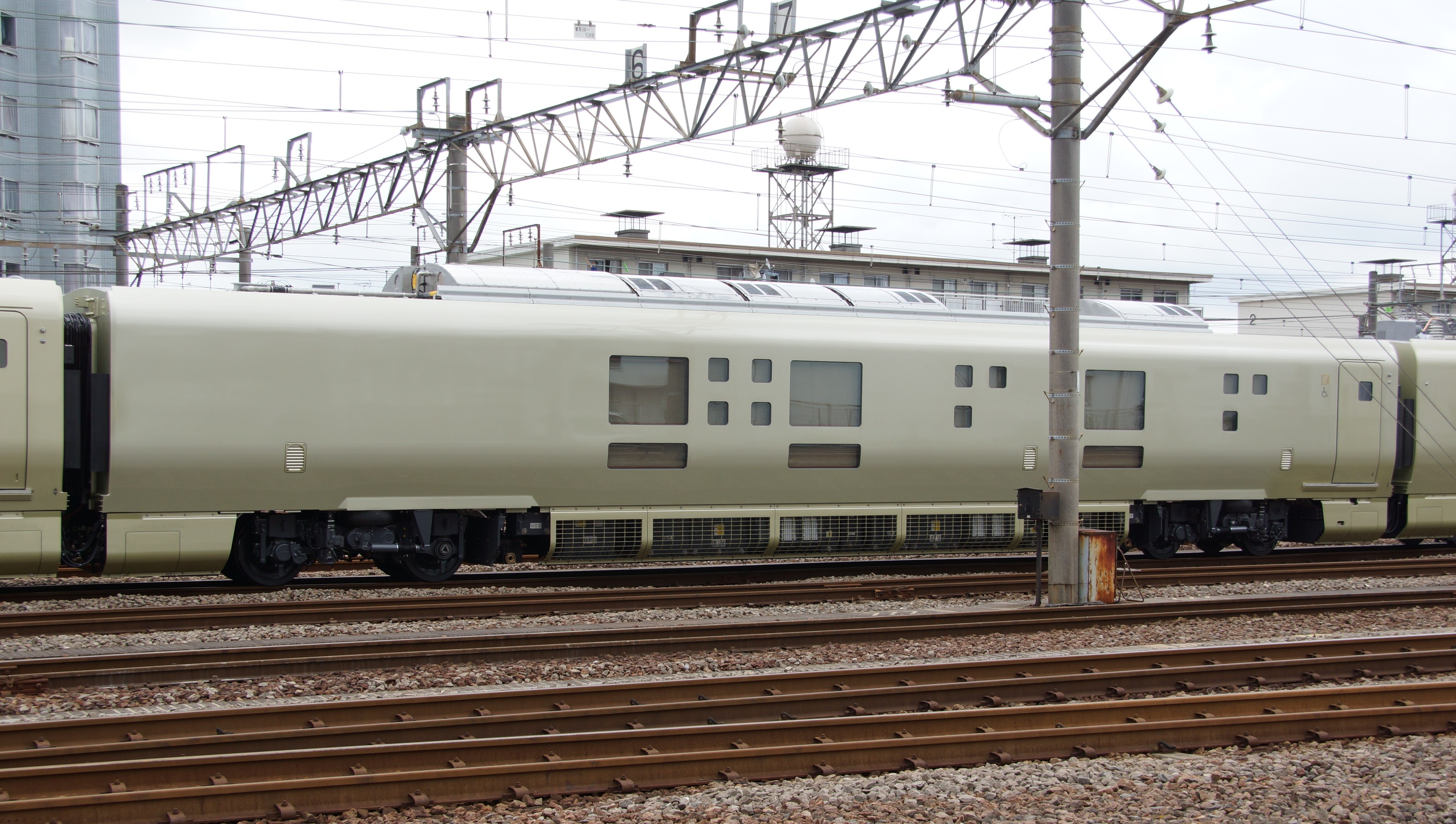
E001-4 in September 2016

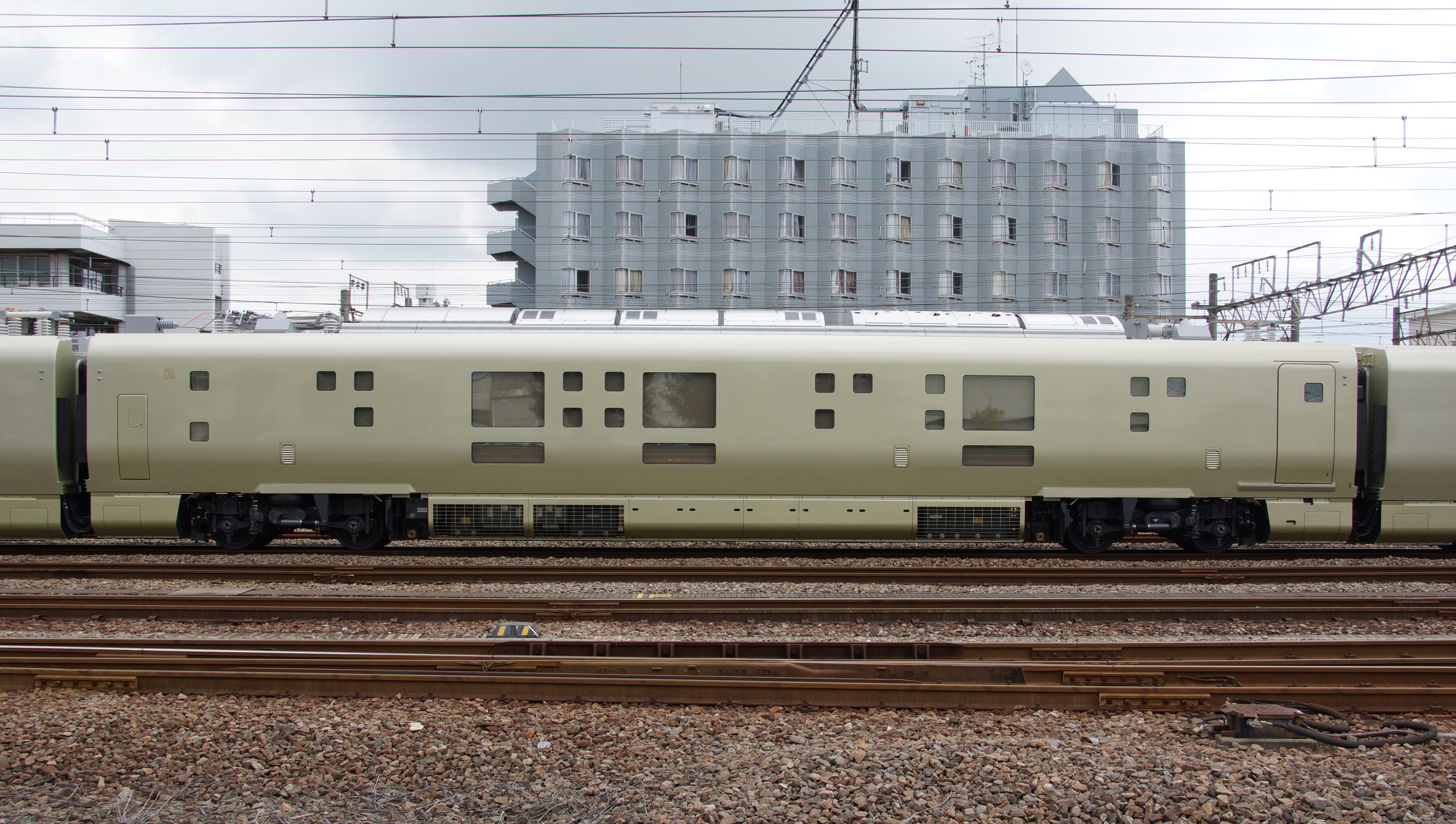
E001-8 in September 2016

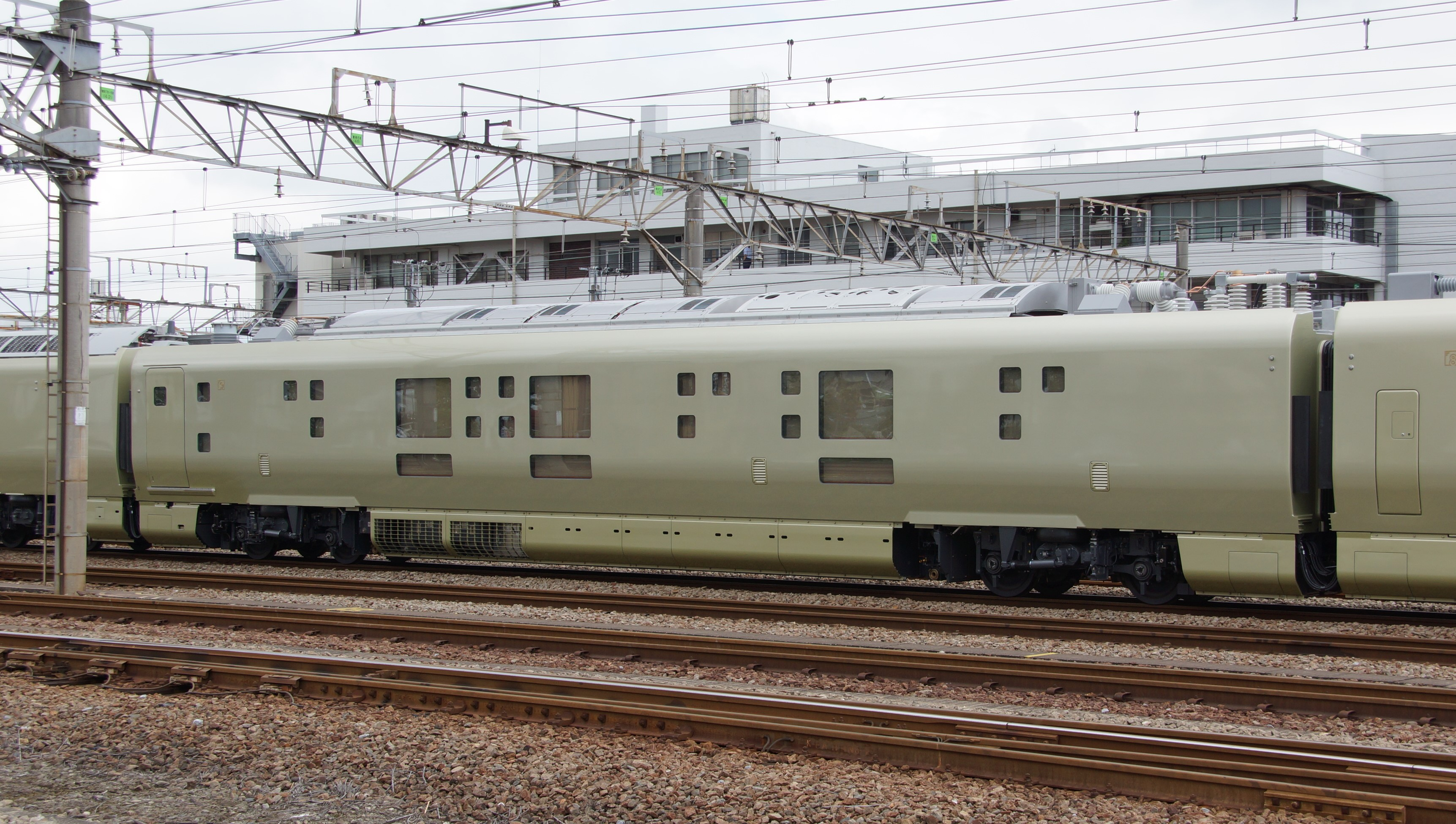
E001-9 in September 2016

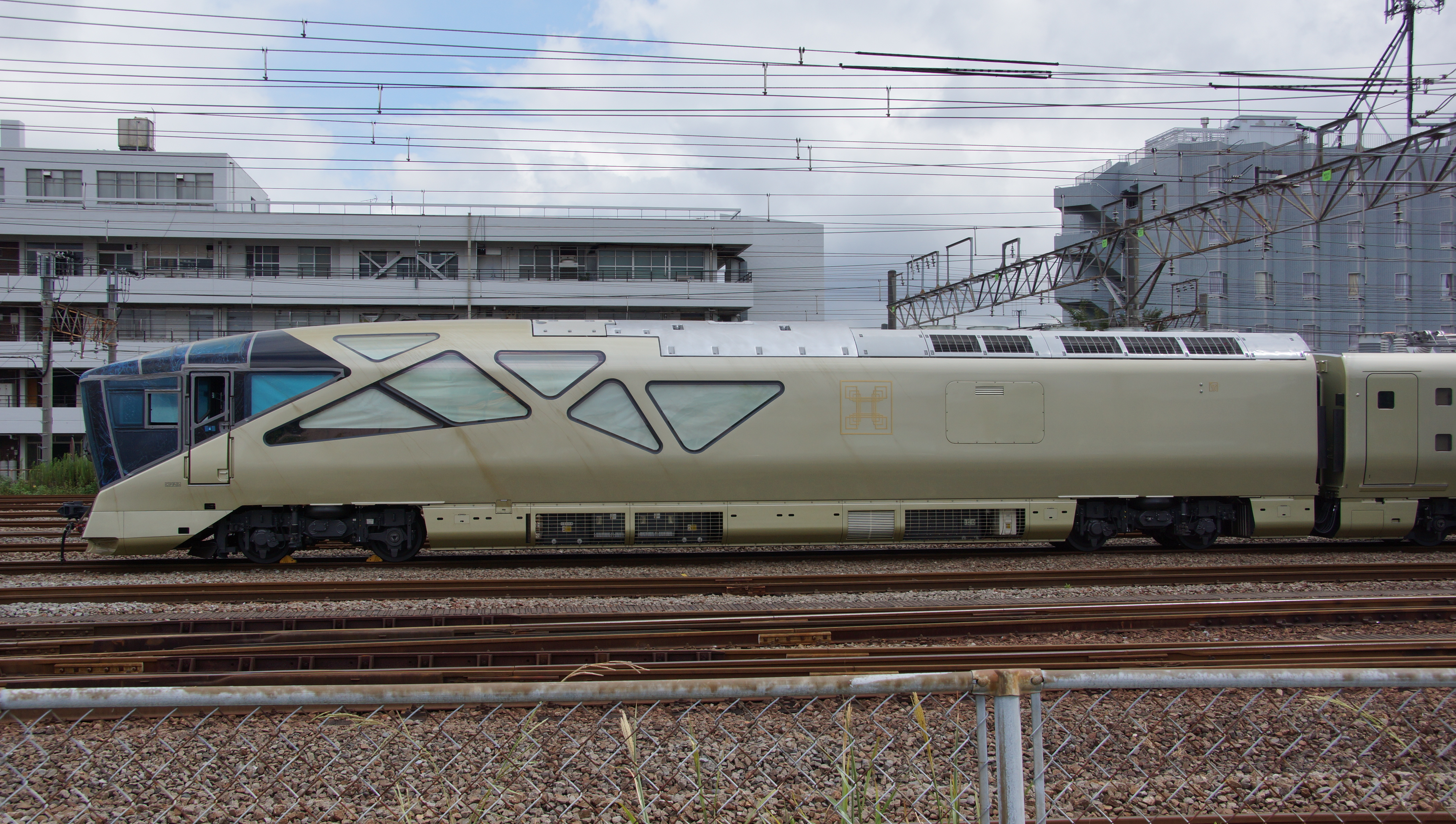
E001-10 in September 2016

== Planned itineraries ==
The train operates on two-day and four-day circular tours from spring to autumn, and on three-day tours during the winter period. Tickets cost between ¥440,000 (US$2,907) and ¥1,950,000 (US$12,883). The Train Suite Shiki-shima operates itineraries that are crafted based on the season of travel to ensure guests experience the best of each location visited.

=== 2-day itinerary (spring–autumn) ===
Day 1
Ueno → Enzan → Obasute (overnight onboard train)
Day 2
Aizu-Wakamatsu → Ueno

=== 4-day itinerary (spring–autumn) ===
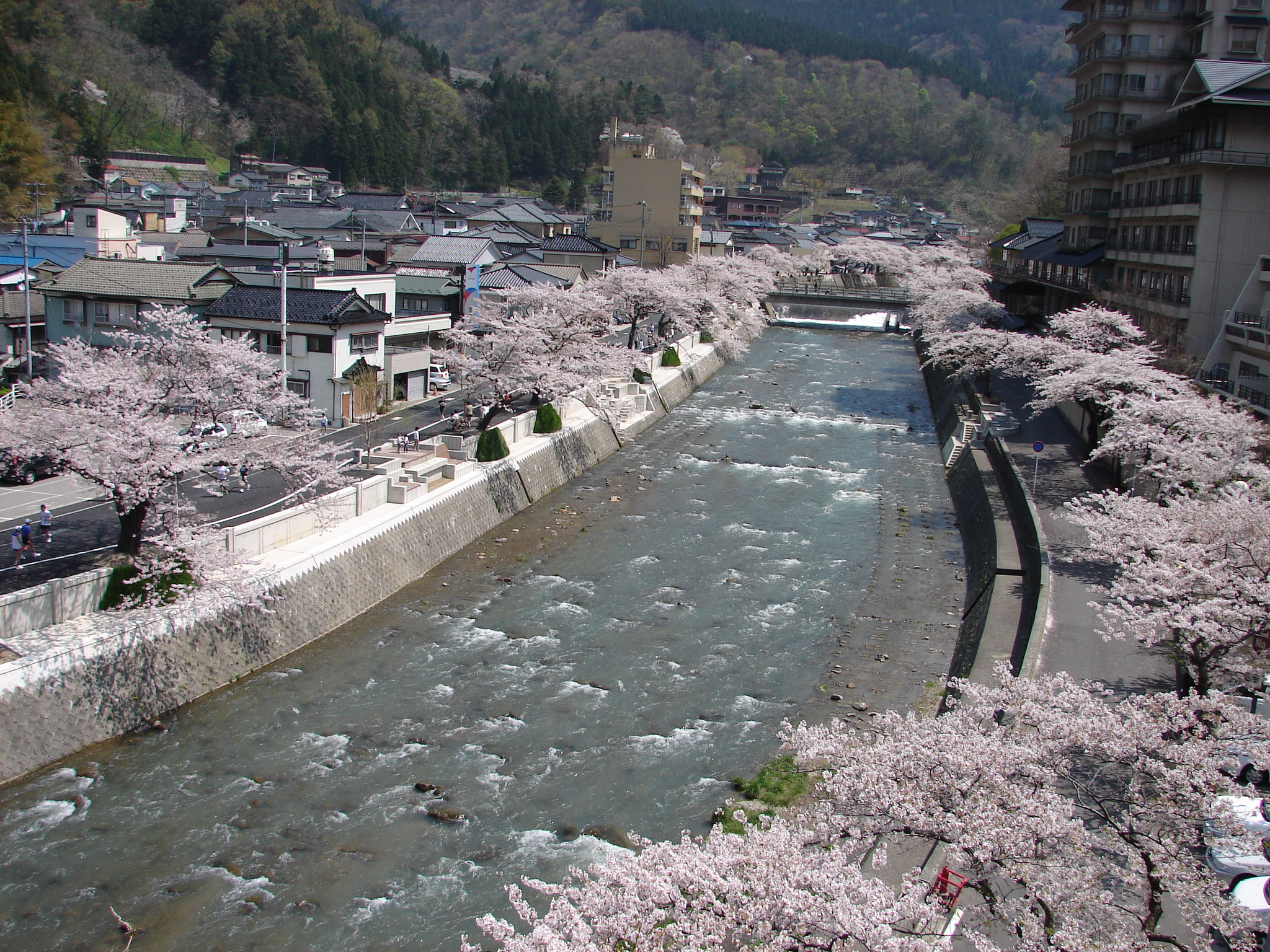
Atsumi Onsen hot spring resort in spring

Day 1
Ueno → Nikko (overnight onboard train)
Day 2
Hakodate → Datemombetsu → Noboribetsu (overnight at hotel accommodation)
Day 3
Higashi-Muroran → Tōya → Shin-Hakodate-Hokuto → Aomori → Hirosaki (overnight onboard train)
Day 4
Tsuruoka → Atsumi Onsen → Niitsu → Higashi-Sanjo → Ueno

=== 3-day itinerary (winter) ===
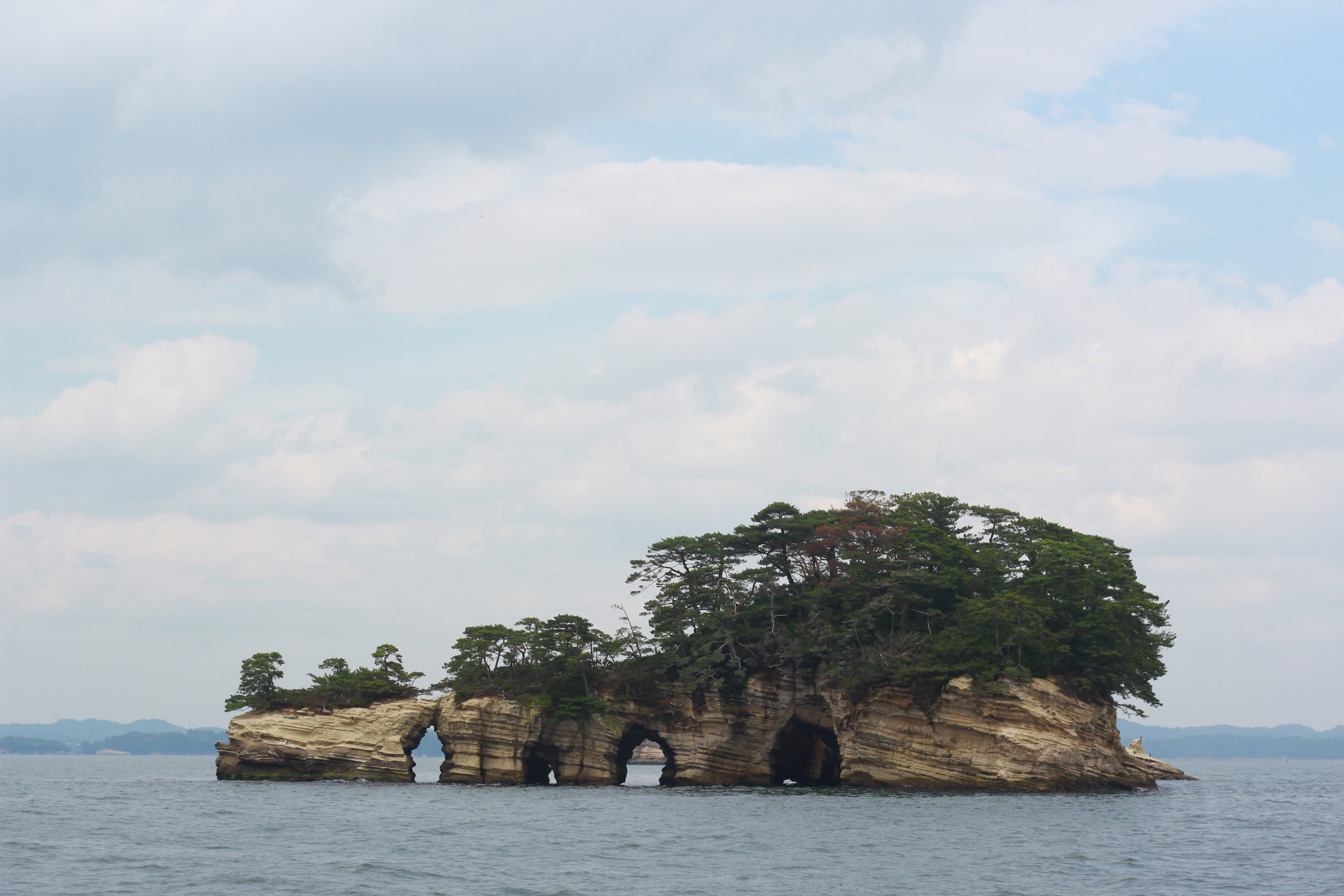
Matsushima Bay

Day 1
Ueno → Shiroishi → Matsushima (overnight onboard train)
Day 2
Aomori → Hirosaki (overnight onboard train)
Day 3
Naruko-Onsen → Ueno

== History ==
An initial artist's impression of the train published in June 2013, and later changed

JR East first announced its plans to build a new luxury cruising train in June 2013, designed by Ken Okuyama, and provisionally scheduled to enter service some time after spring 2016. A year later, in June 2014, JR East published more detailed plans for the new train, with a revised exterior design and service entry date scheduled for spring 2017. The train's name and logo design were officially announced in October 2014. Details of the planned itineraries were published in December 2015.

The first seven cars (1 to 4 and 8 to 10) of the ten-car trainset were delivered from the Kawasaki Heavy Industries factory in Kobe in September 2016. Main line test running commenced on 14 September 2016 on the Joban Line as a seven-car formation. Cars 5 to 7 were delivered from the J-TREC factory in Yokohama on 27 September 2016.

The service was launched formally on 1 May 2017. It attracted great interest, with tickets for the inaugural journey made available via a lottery that was reported to have been oversubscribed by a factor of 76. By the time of the launch, tickets were sold out until March 2018.

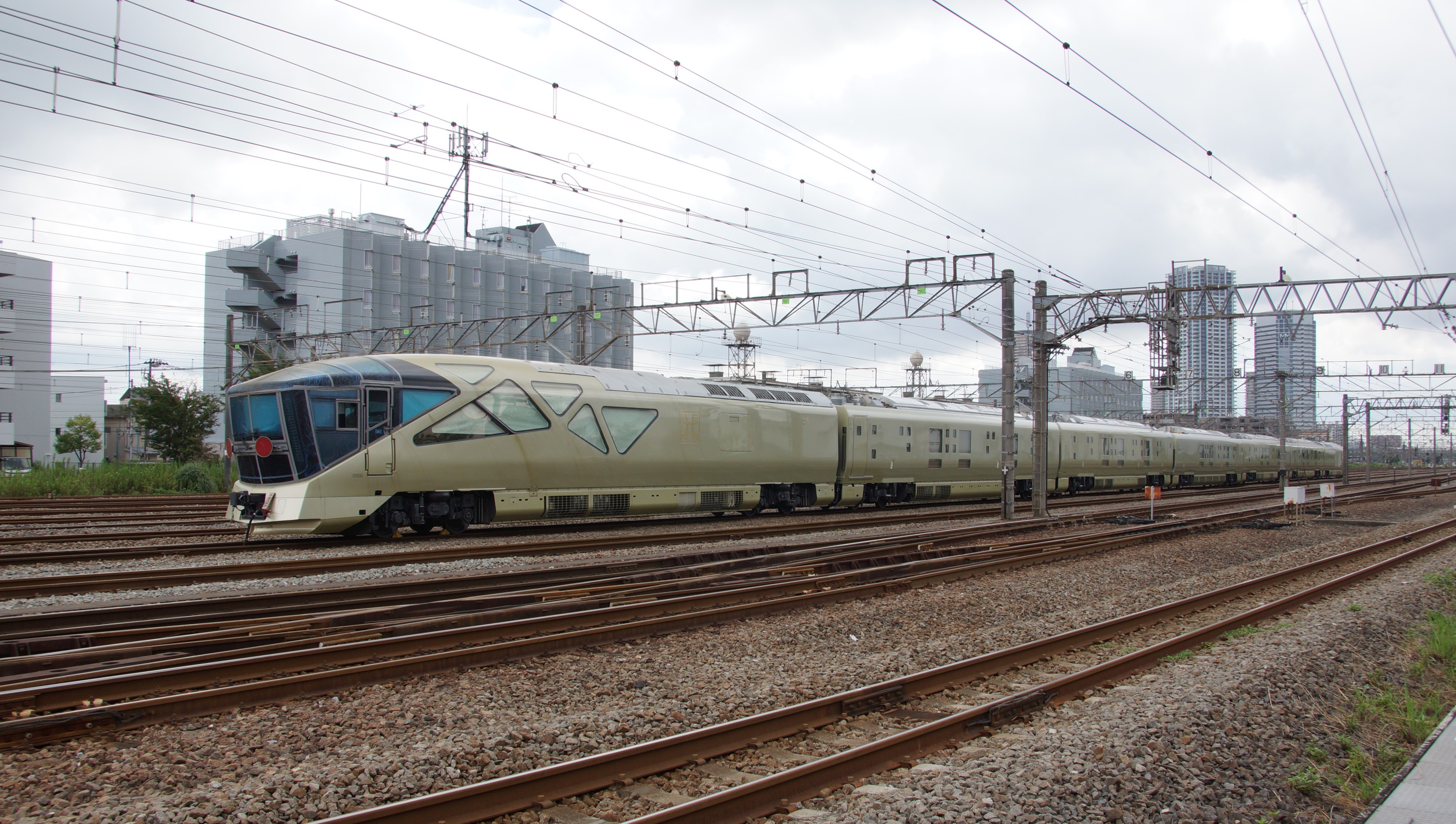
The first seven cars on delivery from Kawasaki Heavy Industries in September 2016

The full 10-car set on a test run on the Tohoku Main Line in January 2017

== See also ==
- List of named passenger trains of Japan
- Joyful Train, the generic name for excursion and charter trains in Japan
- Seven Stars in Kyushu, a luxury cruising train operated in Japan by JR Kyushu
- Twilight Express Mizukaze, a luxury sleeping car excursion train operated by JR West in Japan
- James May: Our Man in Japan, episode two
