= Twilight Express Mizukaze =

Japanese hybrid diesel multiple unit excursion train

87 series Twilight Express Mizukaze
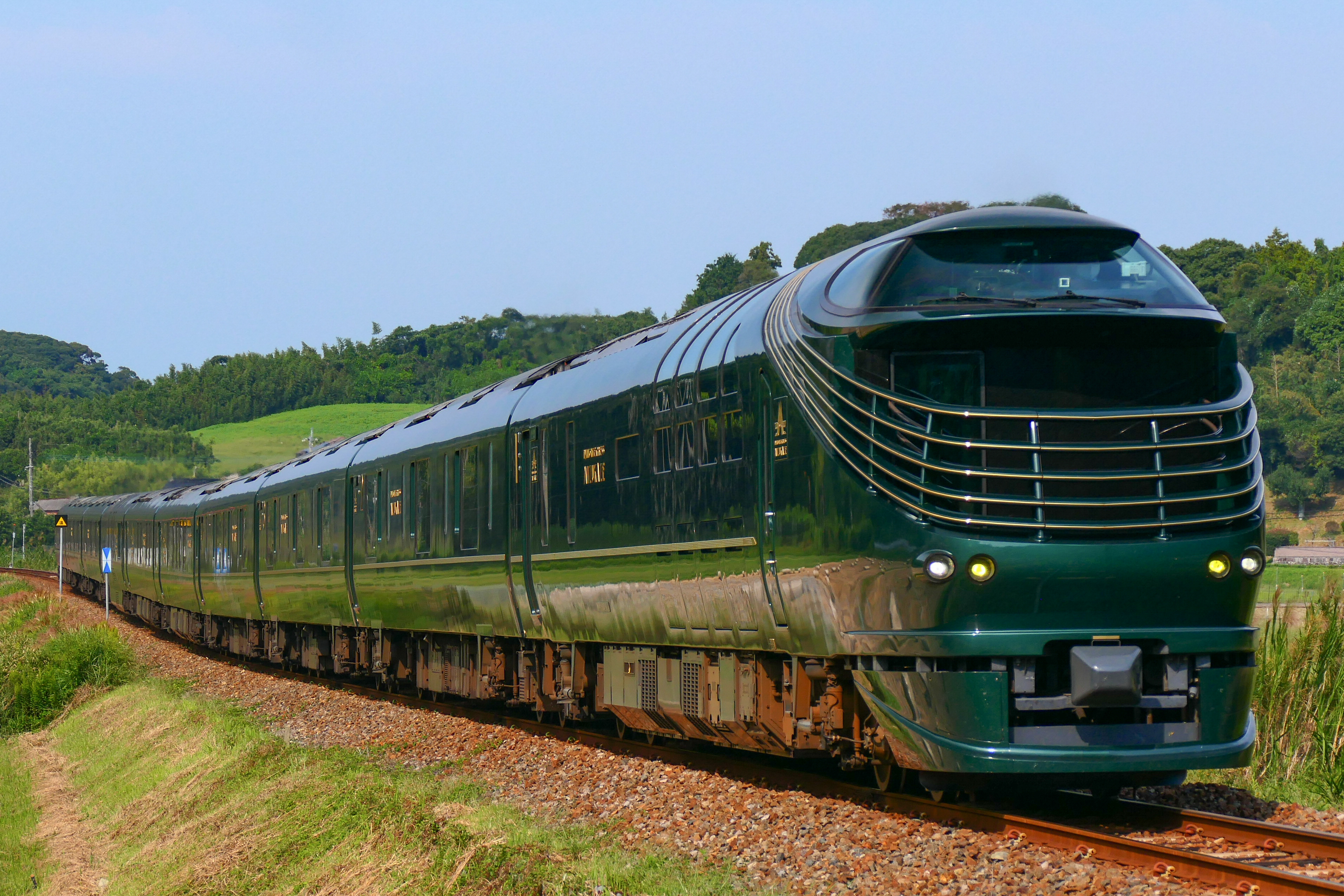
- The 87 series Twilight Express Mizukaze train in October 2022
- Manufacturers: Kawasaki Heavy Industries, Kinki Sharyo
- Entered service: 17 June 2017
- Number built: 10 cars (1 set)
- Formation: 10 cars per set
- Capacity: 34
- Operator: JR West

Specifications
- Car body construction: Steel; Aluminium alloy, double-skin (KiSaINe 86-1, 101, 201, 301, 401)
- Car length: 21,240 mm (69 ft 8 in) (end cars); 20,800 mm (68 ft 3 in) (intermediate cars)
- Width: 2,900 mm (9 ft 6 in)
- Height: 4,070 mm (13 ft 4 in)
- Floor height: 1,220 mm (4 ft 0 in)
- Maximum speed: 110 km/h (68 mph)
- Acceleration: 1.6 km/(h⋅s) (0.99 mph/s)
- Deceleration: 3.9 km/(h⋅s) (2.4 mph/s)
- Track gauge: 1,067 mm (3 ft 6 in)

The 87 series (87系), branded Twilight Express Mizukaze (TWILIGHT EXPRESS 瑞風), is a luxury hybrid diesel multiple unit (DMU) sleeping-car excursion train operated by West Japan Railway Company (JR West) in Japan since 17 June 2017. With a capacity of 34 passengers, the train is used on excursions in the Keihanshin, Sanin, and Sanyo regions of western Japan.

== Design ==
The train was built jointly by Kawasaki Heavy Industries and Kinki Sharyo.

=== Propulsion ===
The train is a ten-car self-propelled hybrid diesel multiple unit (DMU) train combining a diesel generator and battery storage power, allowing it to operate on the non-electrified Sanin Main Line.

=== Styling ===
The train styling was overseen by industrial designer Tetsuo Fukuda (福田 哲夫) and architect and interior designer Kazuya Ura (浦 一也).

=== Logo ===
The train's logo design combines a stylized "M" with the angels used in the logo of JR West's Twilight Express sleeping car train, which operated from 1989 until March 2015.

== Train formation ==
The ten-coach train consists of six sleeping cars, a lounge car, a dining car, and observation cars at either end of the train with open balconies. Five of the sleeping cars have three private suite rooms, while one car has a single luxury suite occupying the entire coach and featuring a bathtub and private balcony. The train formation is as shown below:

| Car No. | 1 | 2 | 3 | 4 | 5 | 6 | 7 | 8 | 9 | 10 |
|---|---|---|---|---|---|---|---|---|---|---|
| Car type | Observation car | Sleeping car | Sleeping car | Sleeping car | Lounge | Dining car | Sleeping car | Sleeping car | Sleeping car | Observation car |
| Designation | MFC2 | TNF1 | TNF3 | TNF4 | ML | MD | TNWF | TNF2 | TNF | MFC1 |
| Numbering | KiITe 87-2 | KiSaINe 86-101 | KiSaINe 86-301 | KiSaINe 86-401 | KiRa 86-1 | KiShi 86-1 | KiSaINe 86-501 | KiSaINe 86-201 | KiSaINe 86-1 | KiITe 87-1 |
| Weight (t) | 55.2 | 43.8 | 40.3 | 41.6 | 58.3 | 58.1 | 48.7 | 40.5 | 43.8 | 55.3 |
| Capacity | 8 | 6 | 6 | 6 | - | - | 4 | 6 | 6 | 8 |
| Facilities | Observation deck | Twin × 3 | Twin × 3 | Single × 2, Twin × 1 | Bar counter | Kitchen | Suite × 1 | Twin × 3 | Twin × 3 | Observation deck |

Cars 1, 5, 6, and 10 are powered. Cars 2, 3, 8, and 9, each have three double-occupancy "Twin" rooms, car 4 has two single-occupancy "Single" rooms and a universal design "Twin" room, and car 7 has one double-occupancy "Suite" room. In addition to the en-suite toilets provided in all rooms, cars 2, 3, 5, 8, and 9 have toilets for use by all passengers.

== Catering ==
On-board catering will be overseen by food columnist Takeshi Kadokami (門上 武司), with some of the menus designed by chef Yoshihiro Murata (村田 吉弘), owner of the Kikunoi restaurant in Kyoto, and Hajime Yoneda (米田 肇), owner of the Hajime restaurant.

== Tour routes ==
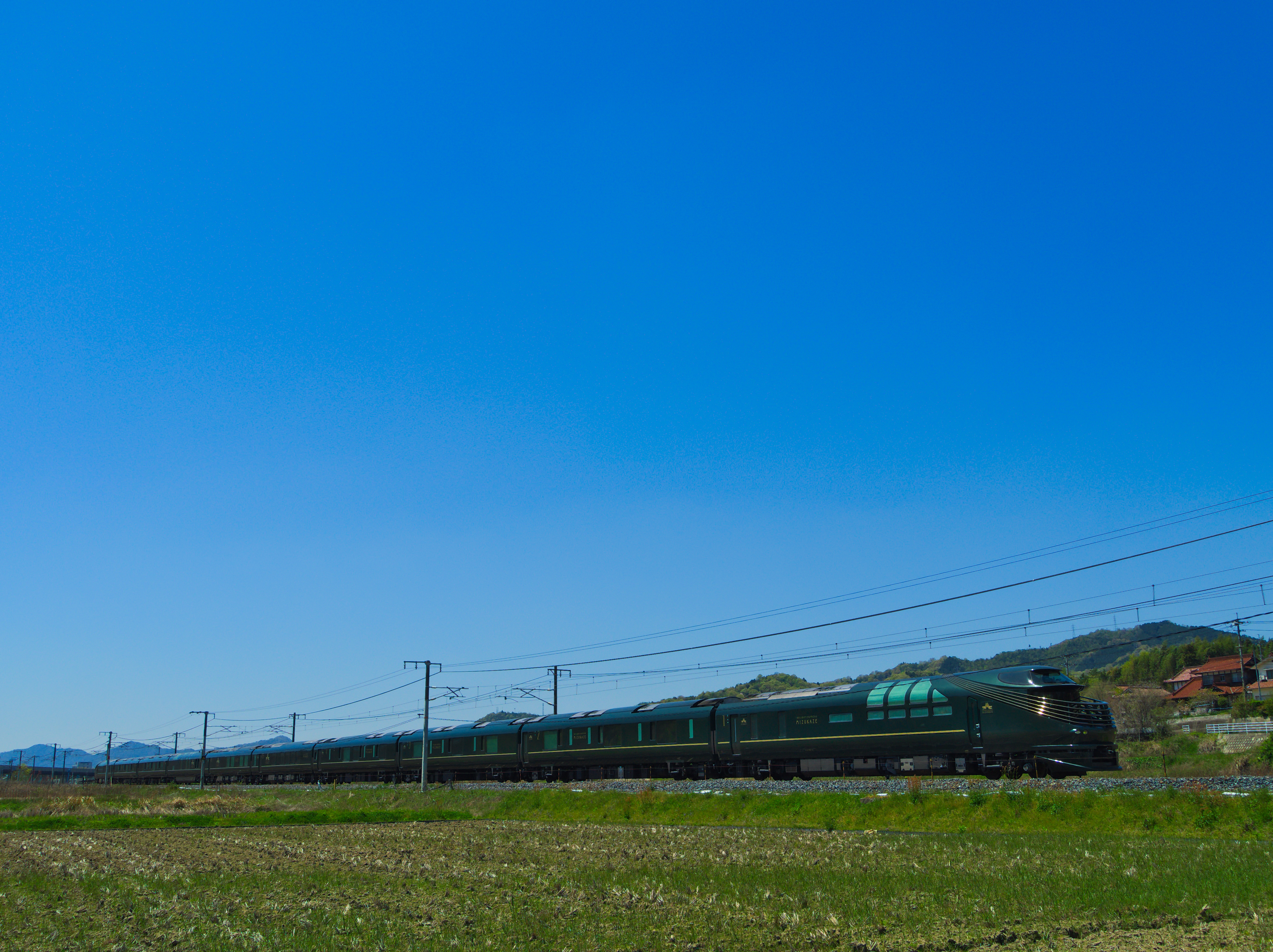
The 87 series Twilight Express Mizukaze train on test in April 2017

The train will initially be used on excursions in the Keihanshin, Sanin, and Sanyo regions of western Japan. The following five tour routes will be offered:

Sanyo Course (Outbound)
Two-day tour from Kyoto and Osaka to Shimonoseki via the Sanyo Main Line, stopping off at Miyajimaguchi and Onomichi en route.

Sanyo Course (Inbound)
Two-day tour from Shimonoseki to Kyoto and Osaka via the Sanyo Main Line, stopping off at Kurashiki and Iwakuni en route.

Sanin Course (Outbound)
Two-day tour from Osaka and Kyoto to Shimonoseki via the Sanin Main Line, stopping off at Kinosaki Onsen and Higashi-Hagi en route.

Sanin Course (Inbound)
Two-day tour from Shimonoseki to Kyoto and Osaka via the Sanin Main Line, stopping off at Izumoshi and Tottori en route.

Sanin & Sanyo Course
Three-day circular tour from Kyoto and Osaka back to Kyoto via the Sanyo Main Line and Sanin Main Line, stopping off at Okayama, Shinji/Matsue, and Higashihama en route.

== History ==
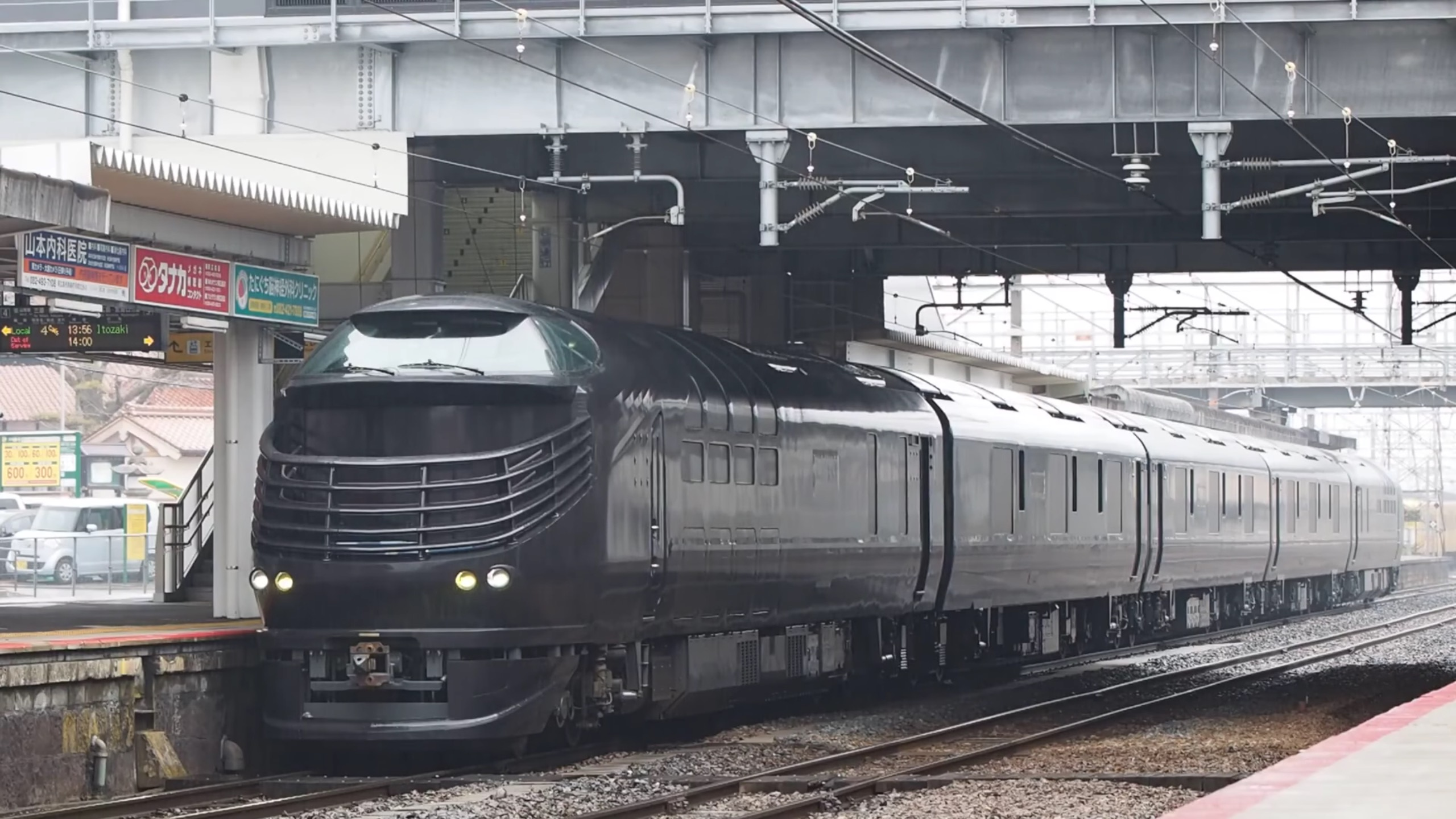
The 87 series Twilight Express Mizukaze train on a test run in early 2017, running as a 5-car formation with black protective vinyl wrapping

JR West first announced its plans to build a new luxury cruising train in May 2014. The name of the train, Twilight Express Mizukaze, and train logo were officially unveiled on 19 February 2015.

The first five intermediate cars of the ten-car trainset were delivered from the Kawasaki Heavy Industries factory in Kobe in March 2016. The two end cars, KiITe 87-1 and KiITe 87-2, were delivered from the Kinki Sharyo factory in Osaka in August 2016. Mainline test running commenced in late September, initially with the train formed as four cars.

== See also ==
- List of named passenger trains of Japan
- Joyful Train, the generic name for excursion and charter trains in Japan
- Seven Stars in Kyushu, a luxury cruising train operated by JR Kyushu in Japan
- Train Suite Shiki-shima, a luxury sleeping car excursion train operated by JR East in Japan
