= Echigo-Hayakawa Station =

Railway station in Murakami, Niigata Prefecture, Japan

Echigo-Hayakawa Station 越後早川駅
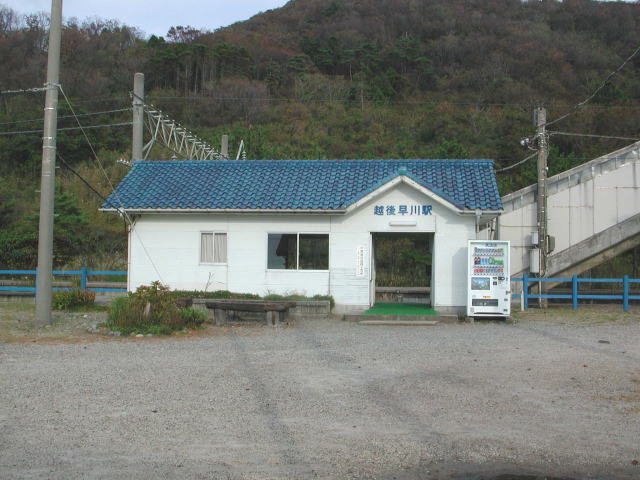
- Echigo-Hayakawa Station, September 2004

General information
- Location: Hayakawa, Murakami-shi, Niigata-ken 959-2026; Japan
- Coordinates: 38°18′57.75″N 139°26′58.85″E
- Operator: JR East
- Line: ■ Uetsu Main Line
- Distance: 71.4 km from Niitsu
- Platforms: 2 side platforms
- Tracks: 2

Other information
- Status: Unstaffed
- Website: Official website

History
- Opened: 31 July 1924

Services
Preceding station	JR East	Following station
Majima towards Niitsu	Uetsu Main Line	Kuwagawa towards Akita
Location
- Location within Japan

Echigo-Hayakawa Station (越後早川駅, Echigo-hayakawa-eki) is a railway station in the city of Murakami, Niigata, Japan, operated by East Japan Railway Company (JR East).

== Lines ==
Echigo-Hayakawa Station is served by the Uetsu Main Line, and is 71.4 kilometers from the starting point of the line at Niitsu Station.

== Station layout ==
The station consists of two ground-level opposed side platforms connected by a footbridge. The station is unattended.

=== Platforms ===
1	■ Uetsu Main Line	for Tsuruoka and Sakata
2	■ Uetsu Main Line	for Murakami and Niitsu

== History ==
Echigo-Hayakawa Station opened on 31 July 1924. With the privatization of Japanese National Railways (JNR) on 1 April 1987, the station came under the control of JR East. Limited Express Sleeper Train Twilight Express stopped at the station until 2015, when the Twilight Express ended.

== Surrounding area ==
- National Route 345

== See also ==
- List of railway stations in Japan
