= Tōya Station (Tōyako) =

Railway station in Tōyako, Hokkaido, Japan

Coordinates: 42°33′2.6676″N 140°45′49.4460″E

H41 Tōya Station 洞爺駅
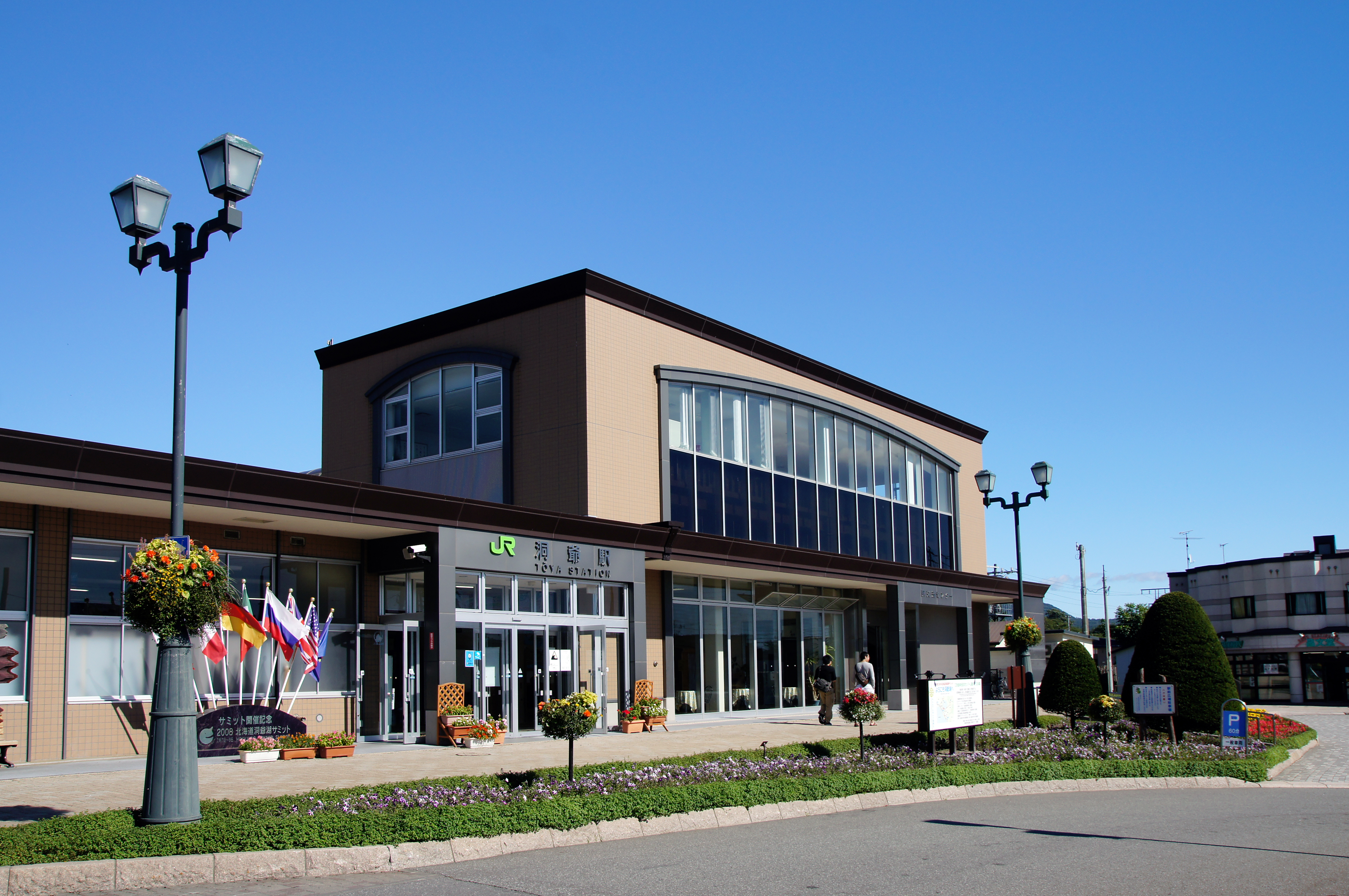
- The station entrance, September 2013

General information
- Location: Tōyako, Abuta, Hokkaido; Japan
- Operator: JR Hokkaido
- Line: Muroran Main Line

Other information
- Station code: H41

History
- Opened: 1928
- Former names: Abuta (until 1962)

Services
Preceding station	JR Hokkaido	Following station
Toyoura H42 towards Oshamambe	Muroran Main Line	Usu H40 towards Iwamizawa
Location
- Location within Hokkaido Location within Japan

Tōya Station (洞爺駅, Tōya-eki) is a railway station on the Muroran Main Line in Tōyako, Hokkaido, Japan, operated by Hokkaido Railway Company (JR Hokkaido). It is numbered "H41".

== Lines ==
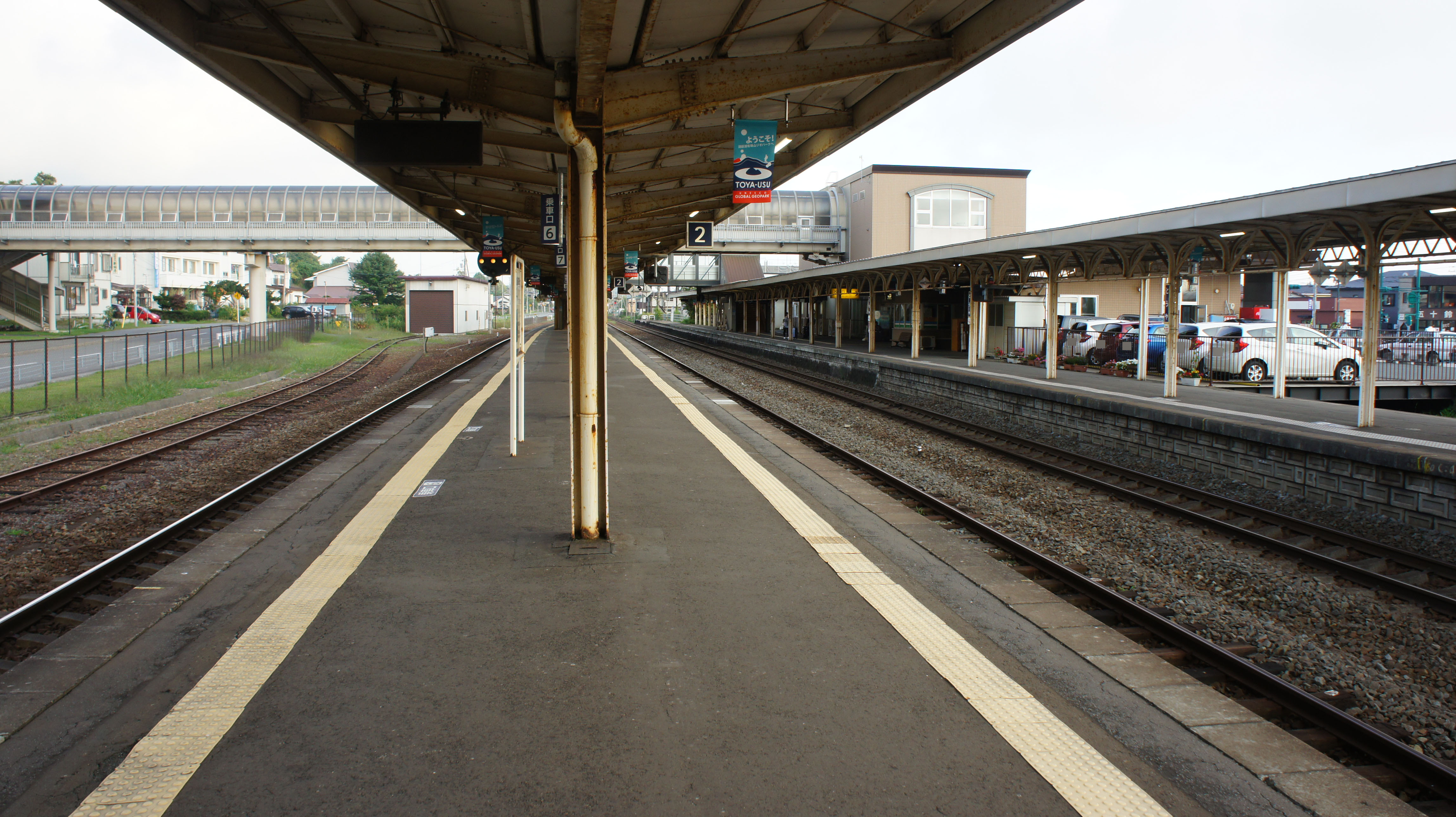
The platforms, September 2017

Tōya Station is served by the Muroran Main Line.

== History ==
The station opened on 10 September 1928, initially named Abuta Station (虻田駅). It was renamed Tōya Station on 1 November 1962. With the privatization of JNR on 1 April 1987, the station came under the control of JR Hokkaido.

== Surrounding area ==
- National Route 37
- National Route 230
- Lake Tōya
- Mount Usu
- Hokkaido Abuta High School
