= Aomori Prefecture =

Prefecture of Japan

Aomori Prefecture 青森県
- Prefecture

Japanese transcription(s)
  - Japanese: 青森県
  - Rōmaji: Aomori-ken
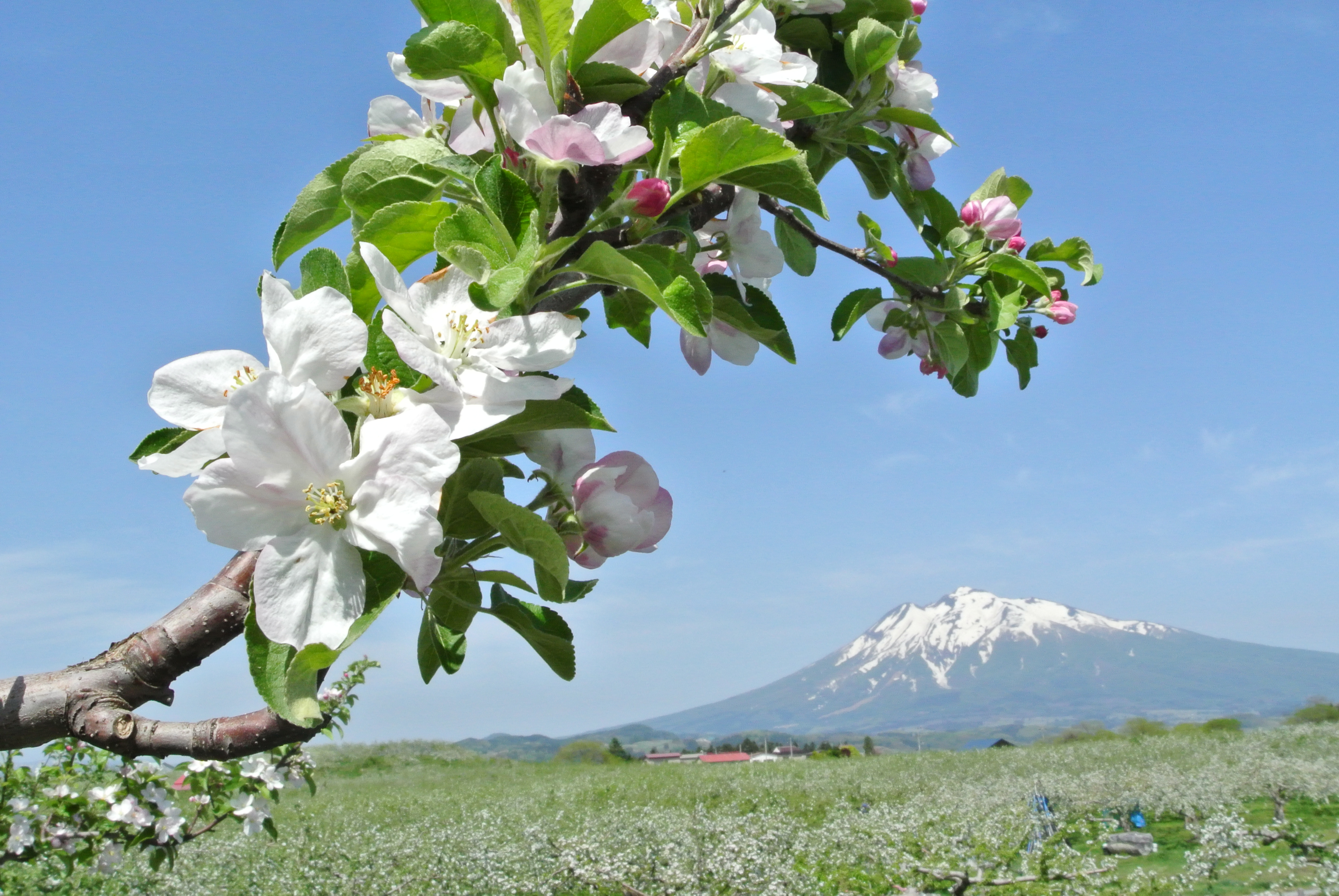
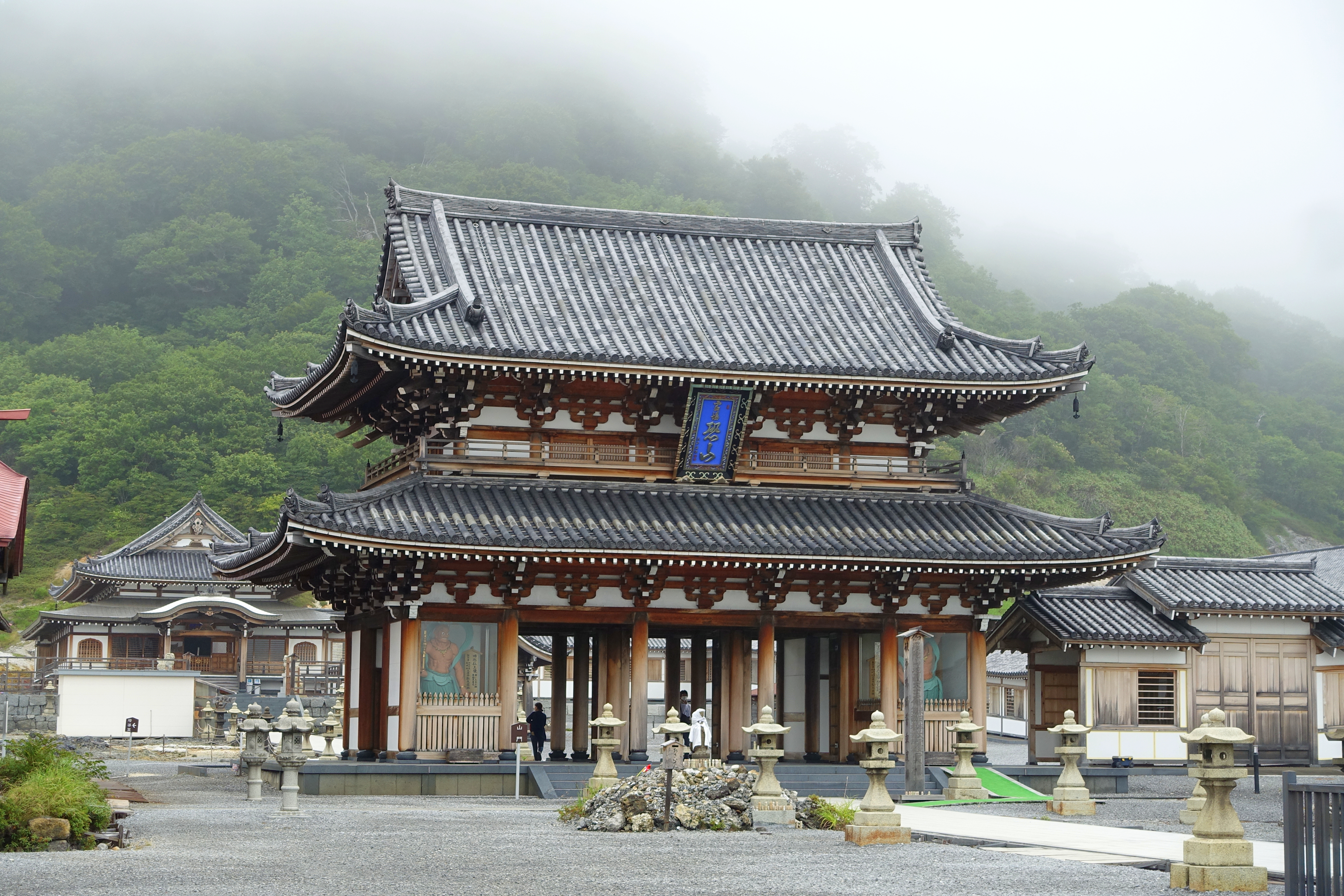
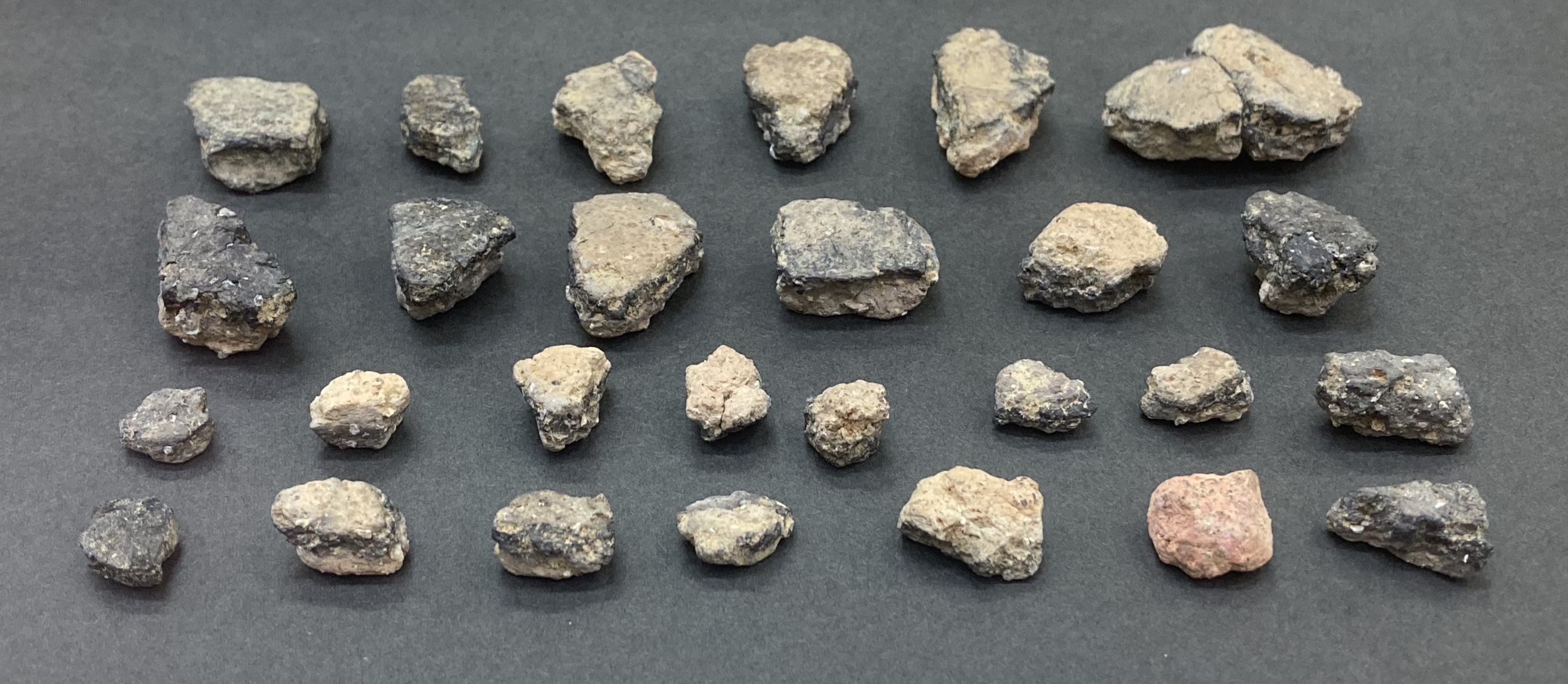
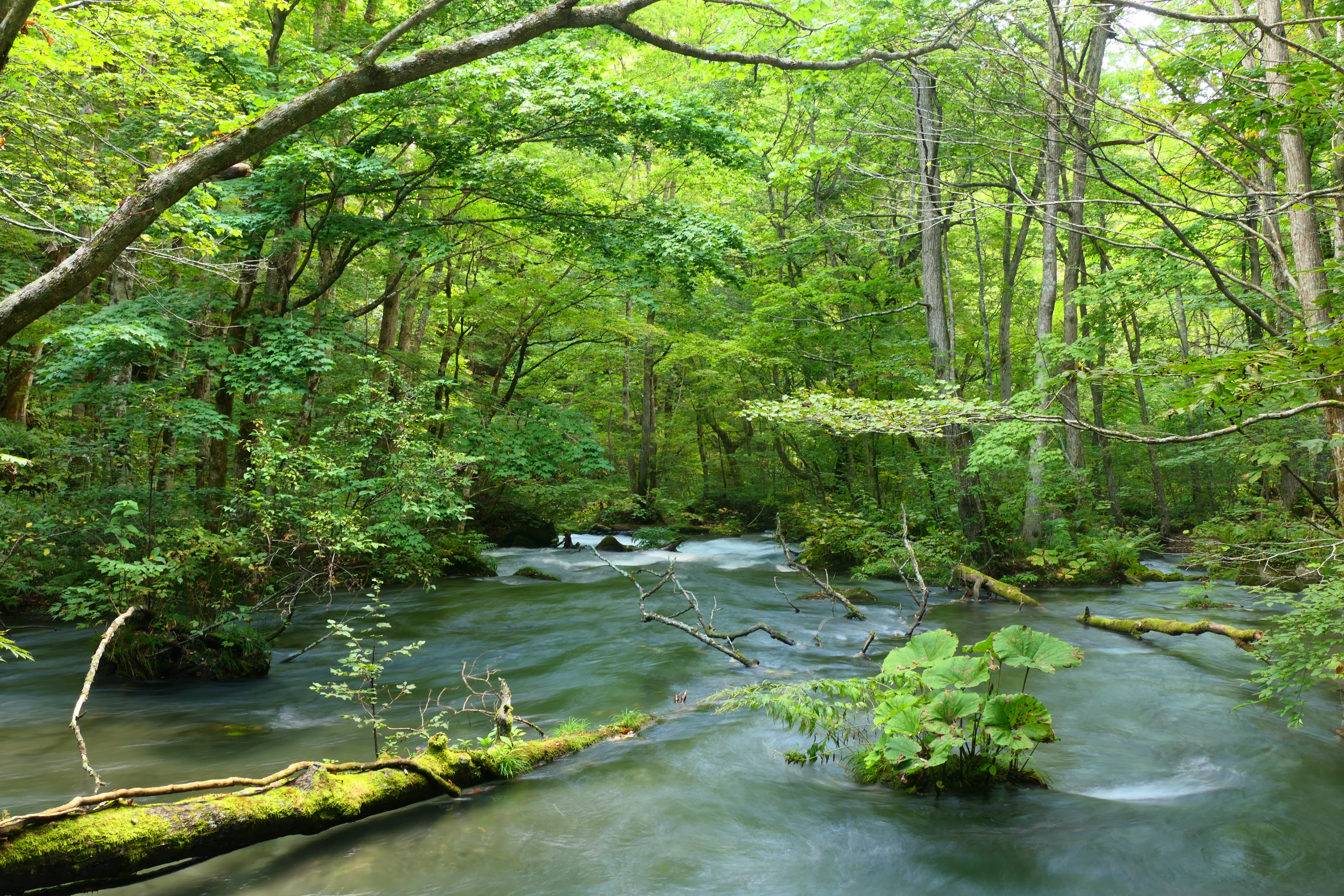
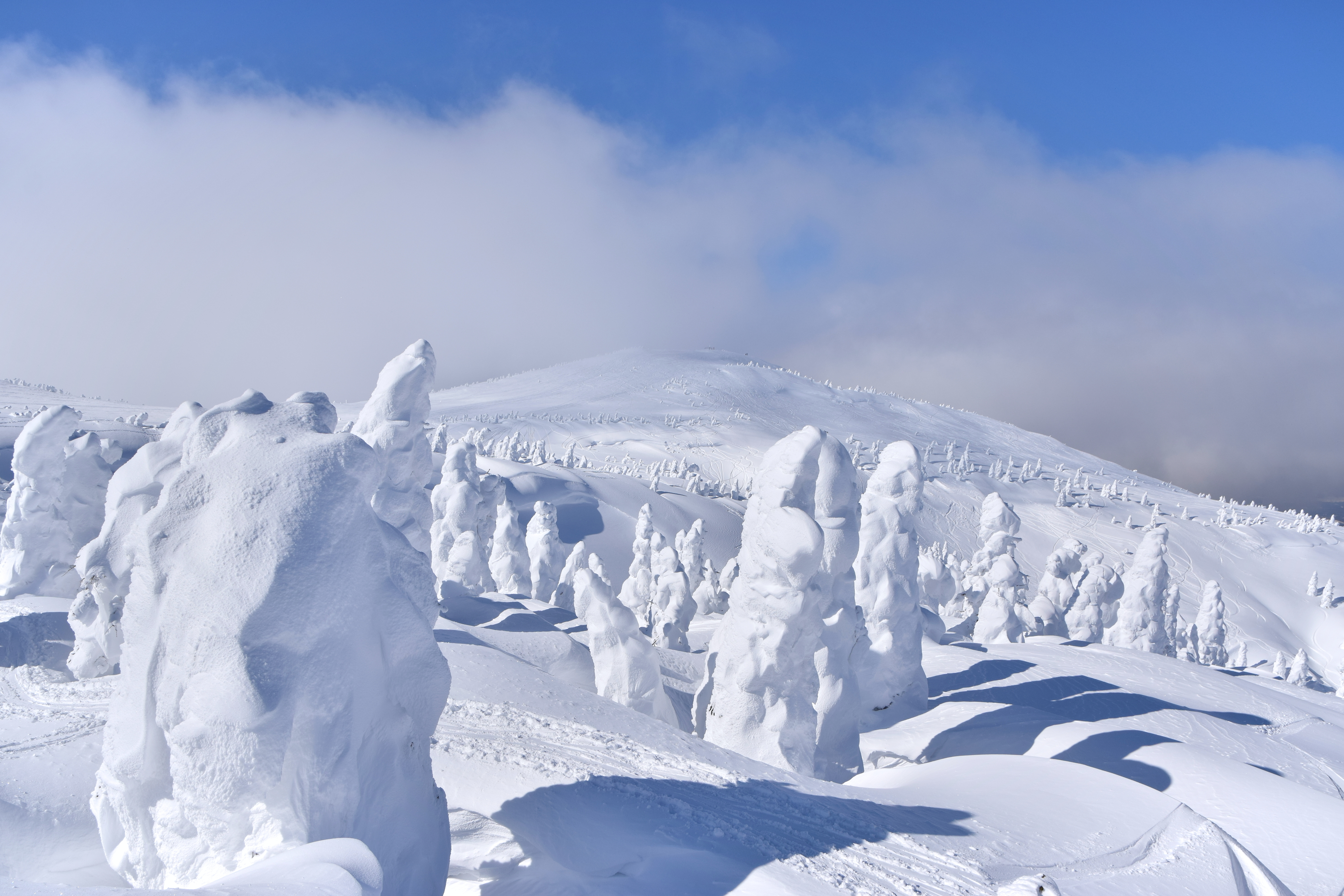
- Mount Iwaki and apple blossom Mount Osore Jōmon period potsherds from Ōdai Yamamoto I Site Oirase River "Snow monsters" on the Hakkōda Mountains

- Flag Symbol
- Anthem: Aomori-ken sanka
- Coordinates: 40°49′29″N 140°44′26″E
- Country: Japan
- Region: Tōhoku
- Island: Honshu
- Establishment as part of Mutsu Province: Around 1094
- Established as part of Rikuō Province: December 7, 1868
- Establishment of Aomori Prefecture: September 4, 1871
- Capital: Aomori
- Subdivisions: List: Districts: 8; Municipalities: 40

Government
  - Governor: Sōichirō Miyashita

Area
  - Total: 9,645.64 km^{2} (3,724.20 sq mi)
  - Rank: 8th
- Highest elevation (Mount Iwaki): 1,624.7 m (5,330 ft)
- Lowest elevation (Pacific Ocean): 0 m (0 ft)

Population (January 1st, 2026)
  - Total: 1,141,747
  - Rank: 31st
  - Density: 118.369/km^{2} (306.575/sq mi)
  - Dialects: Nanbu・Tsugaru・Shimokita
- Demonym: Aomorian

GDP
  - Total: JP¥ 4,439 billion US$ 32.79 billion (2022)
- ISO 3166 code: JP-02
- Longitude: 139°30′ E to 141°41′ E
- Latitude: 40°12′ N to 41°33′ N
- Website: www.pref.aomori.lg.jp
- Symbols of Aomori Prefecture
- Anthem: Hymn of Aomori Prefecture (青森県賛歌, Aomori-ken sanka)
- Song: Message of the Blue Forest (青い森のメッセージ, Aoimori no messēji)
- Bird: Bewick's swan (Cygnus bewickii)
- Fish: Japanese halibut (Paralichthys olivaceus)
- Flower: Apple blossom (Malus domestica)
- Tree: Hiba (Thujopsis dolabrata)

Aomori Prefecture (青森県, Aomori-ken; Japanese pronunciation: [ä̀.ó̞.mò̞.ɾʲì, -mó̞.ɾʲí.kè̞ɴ̀], locally [ä̀.ó̞.mó̞.ɾʲí]) is a prefecture of Japan in the Tōhoku region. The prefecture's capital, largest city, and namesake is the city of Aomori. Aomori is the northernmost prefecture on Japan's main island, Honshu, and is bordered by the Pacific Ocean to the east, Iwate Prefecture to the southeast, Akita Prefecture to the southwest, the Sea of Japan to the west, and Hokkaido across the Tsugaru Strait to the north. Aomori Prefecture is the eighth-largest prefecture, with an area of 9,645.64 km^{2} (3,724.20 sq mi), and the 31st-most populous prefecture, with more than 1.18 million people. Mount Iwaki, an active stratovolcano, is the prefecture's highest point, at 1,624.7 m (5,330 ft).

Humans have inhabited the prefecture for at least 15,000 years, and the oldest evidence of pottery in Japan was discovered at the Jōmon period Ōdai Yamamoto I Site. After centuries of rule by the Nanbu and Tsugaru clans, the prefecture was formed out of the northern part of Mutsu Province during the Meiji Restoration in the 19th century. The entire Tōhoku region, including Aomori Prefecture, experienced significant growth in population and economy until the late 20th century, when a significant population decline began. Though the prefecture remains dominated by primary sector industries, especially apple orchards, it also serves as a transportation and logistics hub due to its location. Additionally, it is the largest producer of black garlic in Japan. Tourism is also a significant part of the prefecture's economy, especially due to the Jōmon Prehistoric Sites in Northern Japan and Shirakami-Sanchi World Heritage Sites.

Aomori Prefecture has a distinctive subculture influenced by its distant location relative to the central government of Japan and the region's long, snowy winters. It is the birthplace of the traditional Tsugaru-jamisen, a local version of the three-stringed musical instrument known as shamisen. Embroidery, pottery, lacquerware, cabinetry, and iron working are also significant crafts in the prefecture. Various porridges and soups are distinctive to Aomori Prefecture. Several festivals are held in Aomori Prefecture; the most noted of which is Aomori Nebuta Matsuri. Aomori Prefecture is home to several association football, baseball, basketball, and ice hockey teams. The prefecture's religious beliefs are heavily rooted in Shinto and Buddhism; it is noted for its blind mediums and purported tomb of Jesus.

== Etymology ==
The name Aomori (青森) can be literally translated as "blue forest". (Note: Ao can mean 'blue' or 'green', depending on context.) The name was first given to a port settlement established by the Hirosaki Domain in 1624 (modern city of Aomori), and most likely originates from a small forest on a hill that existed nearby, which is said to have been used by fishermen as a landmark.

== History ==
=== Jōmon period ===
The Jōmon period is the time between c. 14,000 and 300 BCE, during which Japan was inhabited by the Jōmon people, a diverse hunter-gatherer and early agriculturalist population. The oldest evidence of pottery in Japan was found at the Ōdai Yamamoto I Site in the town of Sotogahama in the northwestern part of the prefecture. The relics found there suggest that the Jōmon period began about 15,000 years ago. By 7,000 BCE, fishing cultures had developed along the shores of the prefecture. Around 3,900 BCE, settlement at the Sannai-Maruyama Site in the present-day city of Aomori began. The settlement shows evidence of wide interaction between the site's inhabitants and people from across Jōmon period Japan, including Hokkaido and Kyushu. The settlement of Sannai-Maruyama ended around 2,300 BCE for unknown reasons. Its abandonment was likely due to the population's subsistence economy being unable to result in sustained growth, with its end being spurred on by the reduced amount of natural resources during a neoglaciation. The Jōmon period continued up to 300 BCE in present-day Aomori Prefecture at the Kamegaoka site in the city of Tsugaru where small statuettes called Shakōkidogū have been found.

=== Yayoi period to Heian period ===
The Yayoi period, c. 300 BCE – c. 300 AD, is one of the major historical periods of the Japanese archipelago. It is generally defined as the era between the beginning of food production based on rice cultivation in Japan and the emergence of keyhole-shaped burial mounds. The region, known then as Michinoku, was inhabited by the Emishi. It is not clear if the Emishi were the descendants of the Jōmon people, a group of the Ainu people, or if both the Ainu and Emishi were descended from the Jōmon people. The northernmost tribe of the Emishi that inhabited what would become Aomori Prefecture was known as the Tsugaru. Historic records mention a series of destructive eruptions in 917 from the volcano at Lake Towada. The eruptive activity peaked on August 17. The Heian period, c. 794 and 1185, was characterized by centralized government influenced by China. Throughout this period, the Emishi were slowly subdued by the Imperial Court in Kyoto before being incorporated into Mutsu Province by the Northern Fujiwara around 1094. The Northern Fujiwara continued to rule the Tōhoku region until 1189. Mutsu Province was a large province that was later broken into Fukushima, Miyagi, Iwate, and Aomori Prefectures and the municipalities of Kazuno and Kosaka in Akita Prefecture.

The Northern Fujiwara set up the port settlement of Tosaminato in present-day Goshogawara to develop trade between their lands, Kyoto, and continental Asia. The Northern Fujiwara were deposed in 1189 by Minamoto no Yoritomo, who would go on to establish the Kamakura shogunate, which is known for the emergence of the samurai, the warrior caste, and for the establishment of feudalism in Japan.

=== Kamakura period ===
The Kamakura period is a phase that marks the governance by the Kamakura shogunate between c. 1185 and 1333. Minamoto no Yoritomo incorporated Mutsu Province into the holdings of the Kamakura shogunate. Nanbu Mitsuyuki, founder of the Nanbu clan, was awarded vast estates in Nukanobu District after he had joined Minamoto no Yoritomo at the Battle of Ishibashiyama in 1180 and the conquest of the Northern Fujiwara.

Nanbu Mitsuyuki built Shōjujidate Castle in what is now Nanbu, Aomori. The eastern area of the current prefecture was dominated by horse ranches, and the Nanbu grew powerful and wealthy on the supply of warhorses. These horse ranches were fortified stockades, numbered one through nine (Ichinohe through Kunohe), and were awarded to the six sons of Nanbu Mitsuyuki, forming the six main branches of the Nanbu clan. The northwestern part of the prefecture was awarded to the Andō clan for their role in driving the Northern Fujiwara out of Tosaminato. The port was expanded under the rule of the Andō clan and they traded heavily with the Ainu in Ezo. Conflict would break out between the Ainu and the Andō clan in 1268 and again in the 1320s. The conflict ended after the Nanbu intervened at the behest of the shogunate. The conflict weakened the Kamakura shogunate in its later years. The Andō became split into northern (Andō) and southern (Akita) divisions. During this time, the Emishi were gradually assimilated into the warrior class.

Buddhism expanded greatly in Japan during this period, with six new schools of Buddhism being founded: Pure Land, Rinzai, Jōdo Shinshū, Sōtō, Nichiren school, and the Ji-shū branch of Pure Land. While these new schools of Buddhism spread to Aomori Prefecture, the process was slow due to the distance from Kamakura. Buddhism is Aomori remained strongly blended with older schools of Buddhism in Aomori Prefecture, especially Shugendō and Tendai.

=== Muromachi period ===
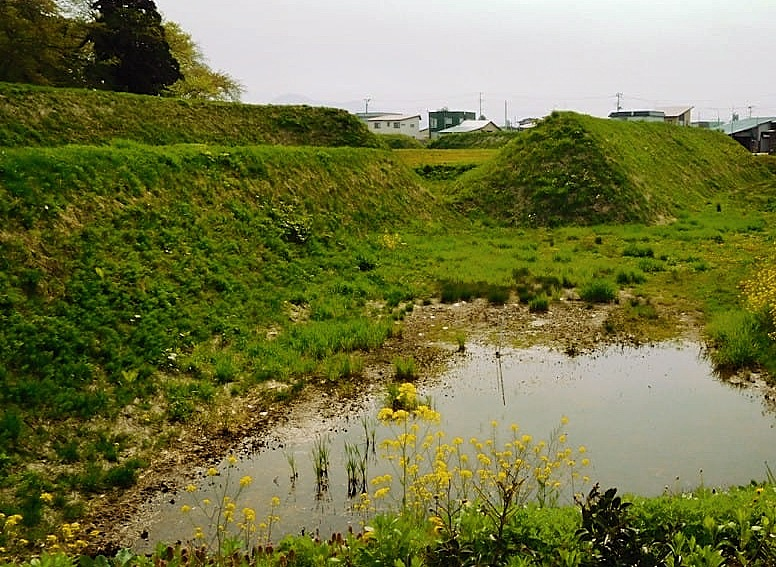
The remains of Horikoshi Castle

The Muromachi period, c. 1336 – c. 1573, saw the rise of the Muromachi or Ashikaga shogunate and Onmyōji, practitioners of astronomy and divination, into high governmental positions. At the onset of the Ashikaga shogunate, the Nanbu and Andō continued to rule the area, with the Nanbu controlling the current prefecture's southeastern section and the Andō controlling the Shimokita and Tsugaru peninsulas. The Andō also were involved with controlling the fringes of Ezo, splitting their attention. In 1336, the Andō completed construction of Horikoshi Castle during the Northern and Southern Courts period. During the Muromachi, the Nanbu slowly began edging the Andō out of present-day Aomori Prefecture. The Andō were pushed out of Tosaminato in 1432, retreating to Ezo, giving the Nanbu control over all their lands. The port settlement would fall into disrepair under the Nanbu.

During the Muromachi period, Aomori Prefecture became a key part of the Japan-Ezo-Northern Asia trade network. Tosaminato on the Tsugaru Peninsula was the primary port for this trade network. By this timeframe the Emishi no longer existed as a distinct polity, but their culture was still influential. Relations with the Ainu in Hokkaido were still strong.

=== Sengoku period ===
The Sengoku period of the 15th and 16th centuries is an era in which civil wars and social upheavals took place almost continuously, similar to the Early Middle Ages in Europe. During the Sengoku period, the Nanbu clan collapsed into several rival factions. One faction under Ōura Tamenobu asserted their control over the Hirosaki Domain. His clan, originally the Ōura clan (大浦氏, Ōura-shi), was of uncertain origins. According to later Tsugaru clan records, the clan was descended from the noble Fujiwara clan and had an accent claim to ownership of the Tsugaru region on the Tsugaru Peninsula and the area surrounding Mount Iwaki in the northwestern corner of Mutsu Province; however, according to the records of their rivals, the Nanbu clan, clan progenitor Ōura Tamenobu was born as either Nanbu Tamenobu or Kuji Tamenobu, from a minor branch house of the Nanbu and was driven from the clan due to discord with his elder brother.

In any event, the Ōura were hereditary vice-district magistrates (郡代補佐, gundai hosa) under the Nanbu clan's local magistrate Ishikawa Takanobu; however, in 1571, Tamenobu attacked and killed Ishikawa and began taking the Nanbu clan's castles in the Tsugaru region. He captured castles at Ishikawa, Daikoji and Aburakawa, and soon gathered support of many former Nanbu retainers in the region. After pledging fealty to Toyotomi Hideyoshi, he was confirmed as an independent warlord in 1590 and changed his name to "Tsugaru", formally establishing the Tsugaru clan. Tsugaru Tamenobu assisted Hideyoshi at the Battle of Odawara, and accompanied his retinue to Hizen during the Korean Expedition. Afterwards, he sided with Tokugawa Ieyasu during the Battle of Sekigahara in 1600.

Control of this region during the Sengoku period was more splintered than the central parts of Japan. Villagers were often forced to labor for the local rulers and feed soldiers. It was also more culturally diverse because of the Emishi-descendants and presence of the Wajin and Ainu. By this time the transition from a hunter-gatherer society to subsistence farming was fairly complete. The people of this region grew rice, barley, wheat, and millet and fished.

=== Edo period ===
Hirosaki Castle, the Edo period seat of the Tsugaru clan

During the Edo period, c. 1600 – c. 1868, Japan was under the rule of the Tokugawa shogunate and some 300 regional daimyo, or feudal lords. The Edo period was a prolonged era of peace, stability, economic expansion, and urbanizaion. After the establishment of the Tokugawa Shogunate, the Nanbu ruled the Shimokita Peninsula and the districts immediately to the south of it. The area to the west of the Nanbu's holdings and to the north of the lands held by the Akita clan were all controlled by the Tsugaru clan, from their capital at Hirosaki. Work on Hirosaki Castle was completed in 1611, replacing Horikoshi Castle as the Tsugaru clan's fortress. By 1631, the Tsugaru clan had solidified their control over their gains made during the Sengoku period. Mutsu Province was struck by the Tenmei famine between 1781 and 1789, due to lower than usual temperatures that were exacerbated by volcanic eruptions at Mount Iwaki, near the Tsugaru clan's capital, Hirosaki, between November 1782 and June 1783.

At the beginning of the Edo period, the last pockets of Ainu people in Honshu still lived in the mountainous areas on the peninsulas of the prefecture. They interacted with the ruling clans to some extent, but they primarily lived off of fishing the waters of Mutsu Bay and the Tsugaru Strait. The Tsugaru clan made two big pushes to assimilate the Ainu; the first came in 1756 and the second came in 1809. Records show that the clan was successful in wiping out the Ainu culture in their holdings, though some geographic names in Aomori Prefecture still retain their original Ainu names. While there was still Ainu contact through trade and fishing, long-term Ainu settlement in Aomori Prefecture had essentially ended by the late Edo period (18th-19th centuries). The Ainu left behind many artifacts and some place and nature-related words are of Ainu origin, such as Hiranai.

Most people during this time lived in villages or on farms. These communities were small and tight-knit with people relying on mutual support. During this time, education become much more common all over Japan, including for commoners. This included Aomori Prefecture, though at a slower rate due to the remoteness, rural nature, and harsh winters.

=== Meiji Restoration to World War II ===
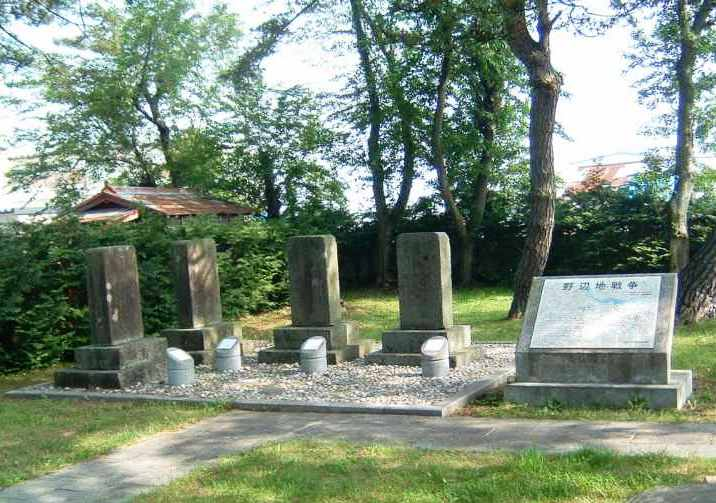
Memorial to the Battle of Noheji

The Meiji Restoration in 1868 restored imperial rule to Japan, with Emperor Meiji assuming the throne. Despite the 1867 resignation of the last shogun, Tokugawa Yoshinobu, the Boshin War had reached northern Japan by late 1868. On September 20, 1868 the pro-Shōgunate Ōuetsu Reppan Dōmei was proclaimed at Morioka, the capital of the Nanbu clan who ruled Morioka Domain. The Tsugaru clan first sided with the pro-imperial forces of Satchō Alliance, and attacked nearby Shōnai Domain. The Tsugaru soon switched course, and briefly became a member of the Ōuetsu Reppan Dōmei. For reasons unclear, the Tsugaru backed out of the alliance and re-joined the imperial cause after a few months. The Nanbu and Tsugaru clans resumed their old rivalry and fought at the Battle of Noheji.

As a result of the minor skirmish, the Tsugaru clan was able to prove its defection from the Ōuetsu Reppan Dōmei and loyalty to the imperial cause. Tsugaru forces later joined the imperial army in attacking the Republic of Ezo at the Battle of Hakodate, where the pro-Shōgunate forces were finally defeated. As a result, the entire clan was able to evade the punitive measures taken by the Meiji government on other northern domains.

In 1868, Mutsu Province was broken up into five provinces in the aftermath of the Boshin War, with a new province, Rikuō, occupying what would later become Aomori Prefecture and the northwestern corner of Iwate Prefecture. On September 4, 1871, Rikuō Province was abolished and divided, establishing today's Aomori Prefecture. Its capital was briefly located in Hirosaki, but it was moved on September to 23, 1871 to the centrally located port village, Aomori City.

The prefecture's new capital, Aomori City, saw rapid expansion due to its importance as a logistic hub in northern Japan. It became a town in 1889 and then a city in 1898. The Nippon Railway, a private company, completed the Tōhoku Main Line in 1891, linking Aomori to Ueno Station in Tokyo. Despite problems with harsh winters and little previous urban development, this accomplishment was crucial to the rapid population and economic development of the prefecture after the Meiji Restoration.

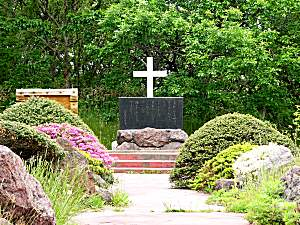
Cheseborough Memorial in Shariki Village

On October 30, 1889, an American merchant ship, Cheseborough, was wrecked off the prefecture's west coast near the village Shariki; many of the ship's crew were saved by the villagers. During a military exercise on January 23, 1902, 199 soldiers died after getting lost during a blizzard in the Hakkōda Mountains disaster. On May 3, 1910, a fire broke out in the Yasukata district. Fanned by strong winds, the fire quickly devastated the whole city. The conflagration claimed 26 lives and injured a further 160 residents. It destroyed 5,246 houses and burnt 19 storage sheds and 157 warehouses. Sabishiro Beach, Misawa was the departure point for Clyde Pangborn and Hugh Herndon when they began the first successful nonstop trans-Pacific flight on October 4, 1931. They landed in East Wenatchee, Washington a little over 41 hours later.

Throughout much of World War II, the conflict remained distant for the people of Aomori Prefecture. Its ports and railways served to connect Hokkaido to the rest of Japan, chiefly bringing coal from the north to production sites in Japan's more populous areas. This connectivity became a strategic target for the American forces as the war neared its conclusion. American carrier-based aircraft attacked Aomori Prefecture on July 14, 1945, destroying infrastructure across the prefecture, including the Seikan Ferry, naval facilities in Mutsu and Misawa, Hachinohe Airfield, and the ports and railways of Aomori and Hachinohe. At 10:30 p.m. on July 28, 1945, a group of 61 American B-29 bombers bombed the city of Aomori. Despite prior warnings, the estimated civilian impact of the air raid on the city was significant, partly because of threats by the prefecture's governor to cut food rations for those who fled the city. About 90 percent of city structures was destroyed, including 18,000 homes, along with 1,767 people killed and 282 people injured.

=== 1945 to present ===
During the occupation of Japan, Aomori Prefecture's military bases were controlled by the US military. Hachinohe Airfield was occupied until 1950, and was called Camp Haugen. Misawa Air Base was occupied and rebuilt by the United States Army Air Forces; since then the base has been shared by the Japanese military and the US military.

The occupation government began an extensive Land Reclamation Policy (LRP) in 1946 aimed at reintegrating the seven million repatriates from Japan's former Asian colonies. This resulted in 269 new villages and 29,612 households on approximately 24,400 hectares (60,000 acres) of land in Aomori Prefecture.

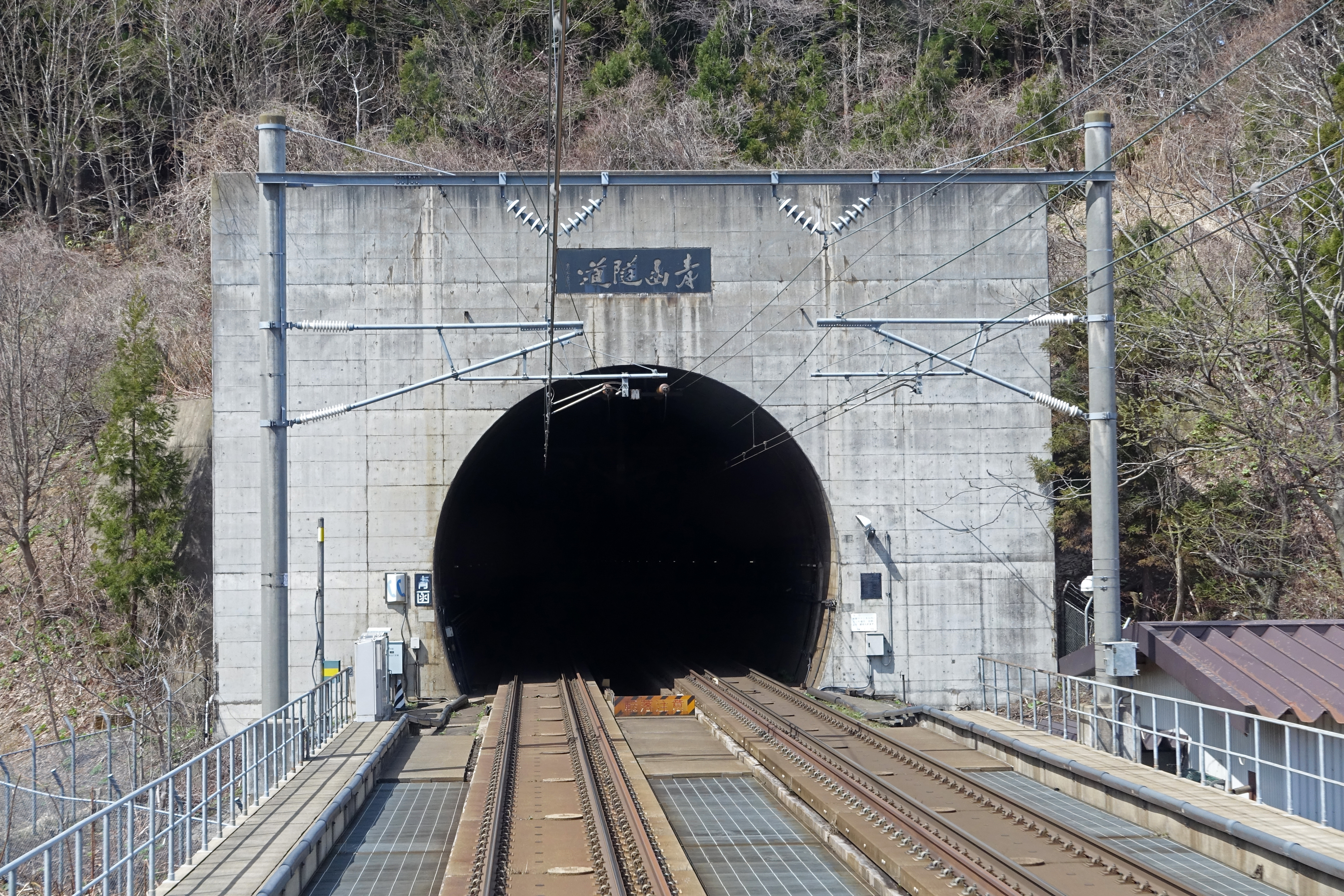
Entrance to Seikan Tunnel from Honshu side; note the dual gauge tracks

In March 1985, after 23 years of labor and a financial investment of 690 billion yen, the Seikan Tunnel finally linked the islands of Honshū and Hokkaido, thereby becoming the longest tunnel of its kind in the world. Almost exactly three years later, on March 13, railroad service was inaugurated on the Tsugaru Kaikyo Line. The tunnel's opening to rail traffic saw the end of the Seikan Ferry rail service. During their 80 years of service, the Seikan rail ferries sailed between Aomori City and Hakodate some 720,000 times, carrying 160 million passengers. Ferry service continues to operate between the cities, ferrying automobile traffic and passengers rather than trains.

On June 2, 2007, four North Korean defectors reached Aomori Prefecture, after having been at sea for six days, marking the second known case ever where North Korean defectors have successfully reached Japan by boat. This was a family of four who were picked up by the Japan Coast Guard and taken to the port of Fukaura. They were eventually flown to Incheon International Airport in South Korea at their own request.

On March 11, 2011, a magnitude 9.0 earthquake struck the east coast of Japan. The southeastern coast of Aomori Prefecture was affected by the resulting tsunami: three people died and one was missing. Buildings along harbors were damaged, with boats thrown about in the streets. Disruptions as result of the earthquake to road and rail networks were widespread throughout the prefecture in the days following the earthquake. The Tōhoku Shinkansen rail line was significantly damaged, cutting connectivity from the prefecture to points south along the line until full service was restored in late September.

During the first week of January 2025, a record setting disaster-level snowfall hit Aomori Prefecture, with snow depths as much as 3.74 meters (12.3 ft). Sōichirō Miyashita, the provincial governor, called this snowfall a "disaster" and invoked the Disaster Relief Act, the first time the prefecture had done so in 13 years. At least 4 people died as a result of the snowfall. This snowfall did massive damage to the prefecture's important apple harvest, causing an estimated ¥10 billion (US$64.8 million) in damage to the crop.

== Geography ==
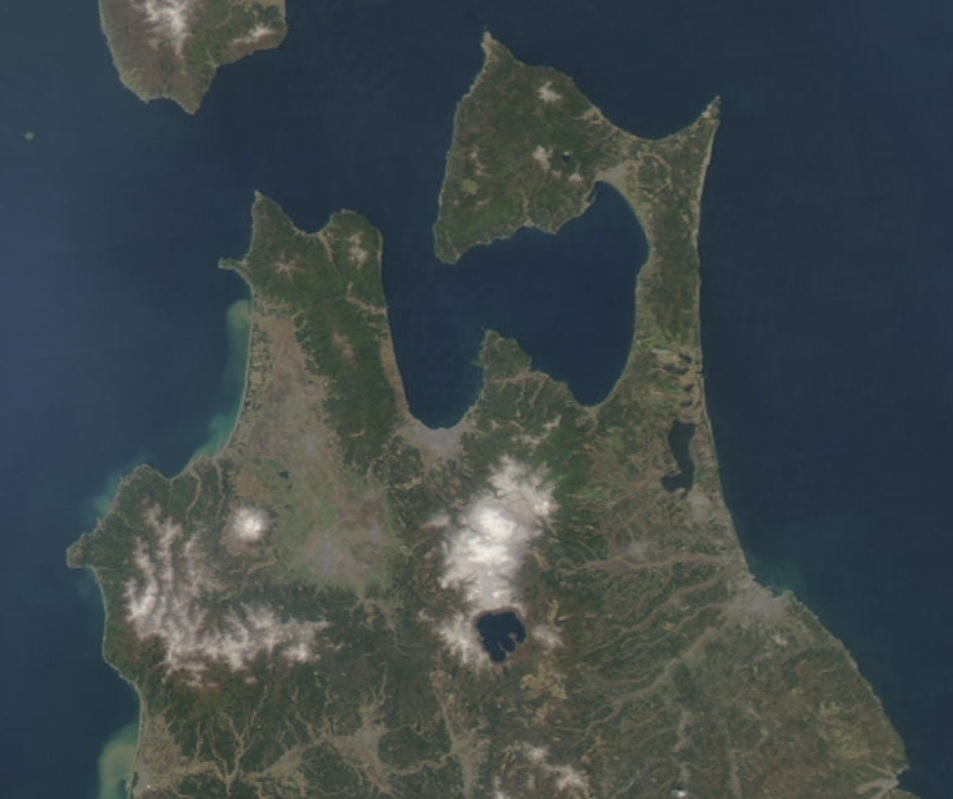
Aomori Prefecture and the surrounding area as seen from space

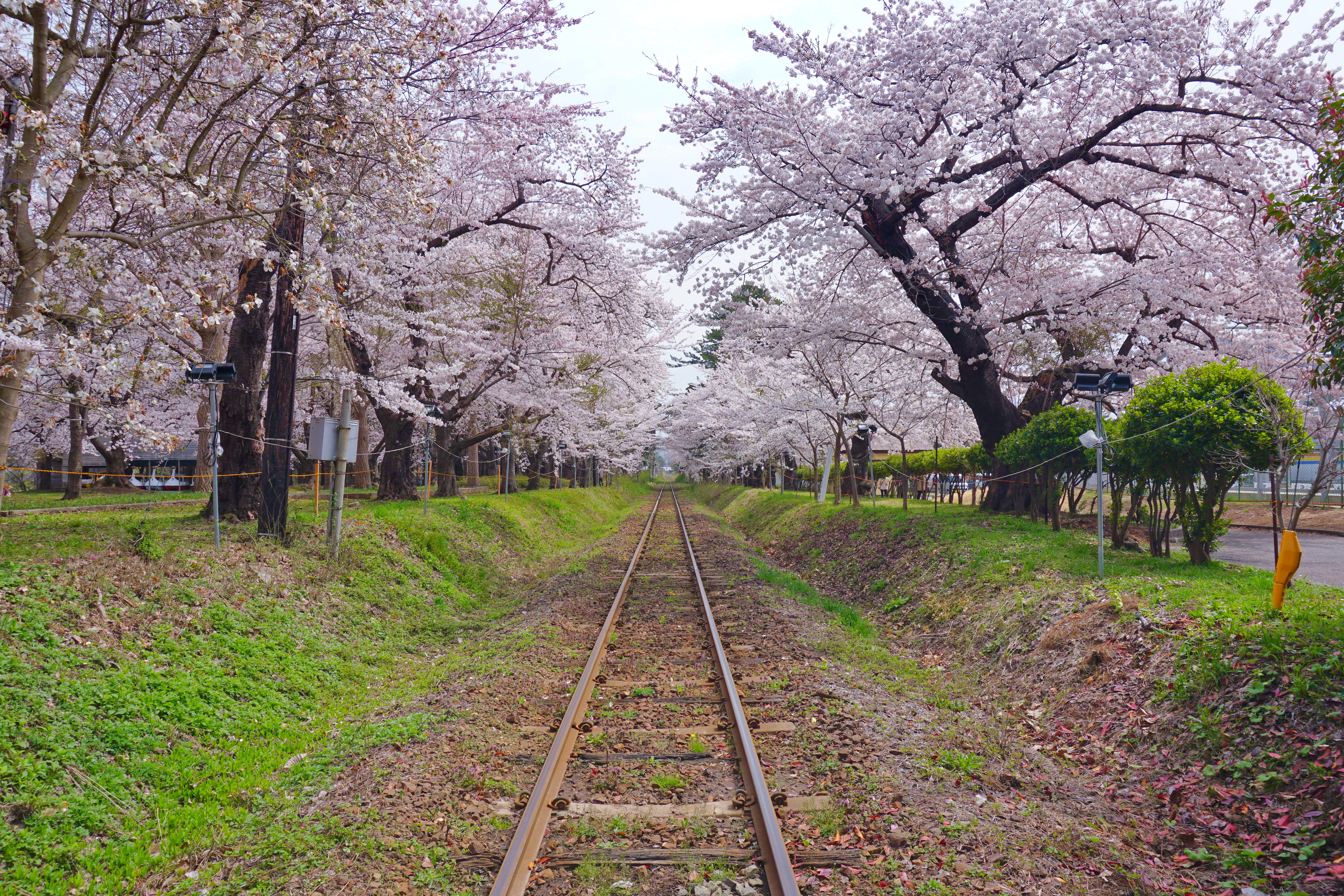
Tsugaru Railway in Ashino Chishōgun Prefectural Natural Park

Aomori Prefecture is the northernmost prefecture in the Tōhoku region, lying on the northern end of the island of Honshu. It faces Hokkaido from across the Tsugaru Strait and it borders Akita and Iwate in the south. The prefecture is flanked by the Pacific Ocean to the east and the Sea of Japan to the west with the Tsugaru Strait linking those bodies of water to the north of the prefecture. The islets of Kyūroku-jima in the Sea of Japan are the prefecture's westernmost point. Ōma, at the northwestern tip of the axe-shaped Shimokita Peninsula, is the northernmost point of Honshu. The Shimokita and Tsugaru Peninsulas enclose Mutsu Bay. Between those peninsulas lies the smaller Natsudomari Peninsula, the northern end of the Ōu Mountains. The three peninsulas are prominently visible in the prefecture's symbol, a stylized map. Aomori Prefecture is the eighth-largest prefecture, with an area of 9,645.64 km^{2} (3,724.20 sq mi), and the 31st-most populous prefecture, with more than 1.18 million people. Mount Iwaki, an active stratovolcano, is the prefecture's highest point, at almost 1,625 m (5,331 ft).

Lake Ogawara lies at the base of the Shimokita Peninsula. It is the prefecture's largest lake and the eleventh largest in Japan. It is also the largest brackish lake in the Tōhoku area. Lake Towada sits in a volcanic caldera, straddles Aomori Prefecture's boundary with Akita. It is a primary feature of Towada-Hachimantai National Park and is Honshu's largest caldera lake. Also within the park, the Oirase River flows east towards the Pacific Ocean from Lake Towada. Another feature of the park, the Hakkōda Mountains, an expansive volcanic group, rises in the lands to the south of the city of Aomori and north of Lake Towada.

Shirakami-Sanchi, a UNESCO World Heritage Site, is located in the Shirakami Mountains in the western part of the prefecture. The site contains the largest surviving virgin beech forest in East Asia, which is home to over 87 species of birds. Mount Iwaki, a stratovolcano and the prefecture's highest point lies to northeast of the Shirakami Mountains. The lands to the east and northeast of Mount Iwaki are an expansive floodplain that is drained by the Iwaki River. Hirosaki, the former capital of the Tsugaru clan, sits on the banks of the river.

As of March 31, 2019, 12 percent of the total land area of the prefecture was designated as Natural Parks, namely the Towada-Hachimantai and Sanriku Fukkō National Parks; Shimokita Hantō and Tsugaru Quasi-National Parks; and Asamushi-Natsudomari, Ashino Chishōgun, Iwaki Kōgen, Kuroishi Onsenkyō, Nakuidake, Ōwani Ikarigaseki Onsenkyō, and Tsugaru Shirakami Prefectural Natural Parks; and Mount Bonju Prefectural Forest.

=== Natural resources ===
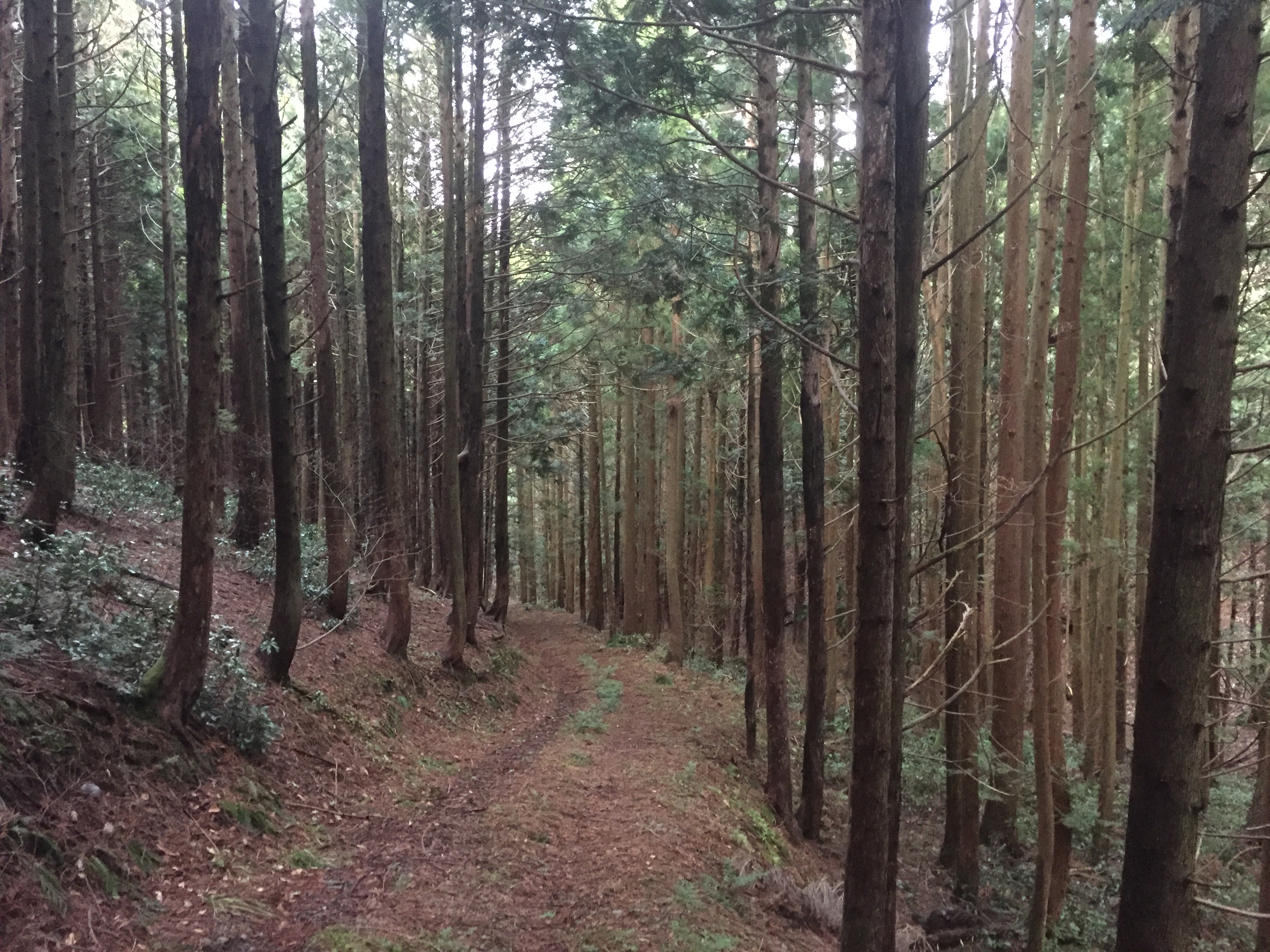
A logging trail through Thujopsis timberland in Hiranai

Aomori Prefecture is highly biodiverse and rural, with forests covering 66 percent of its land and it promotes responsible forestry practices; the exemplars are the virgin Japanese beech forests of Shirakami-Sanchi. The Shirakami Mountains are primarily granite and sedimentary rock and also include rhyolite and quartz diorite. The prefecture has many waterfalls and rivers. Significant birds and mammals include: harlequin duck, Hodgson's hawk eagle, golden eagle, black woodpecker, Japanese serow, Japanese dormouse, Japanese macaque—those found on Shimokita Peninsula are the world's northernmost wild primates, and Tsukinowa bear.

Being surrounded on three sides by ocean, marine resources are a significant food source for the entire country of Japan, not just the prefecture, which includes: tuna (especially the "black diamond" type from Ōma), akaika (flying squid), scallop, flounder, monkfish, sea urchin roe, and konbu (kelp).

In 2011, non-ferrous metal mining was 23.7 percent of the prefecture's economy. Ferrous metals and nickel are also mined. The Hachinohe mine is a limestone quarry that is the lowest point in Japan at 170 meters (560 ft) below sea level. Tsugaruite is a sulfosalt mineral still being researched that was discovered at the Yunosawa mine in the Tsugaru region in 1997 and approved as a new mineral by the International Mineralogical Association in 1998.

=== Cities, towns, and villages ===
==== Cities ====
Ten cities are located in Aomori Prefecture:

Name		Area (km^{2})	Population	Map
Rōmaji	Kanji	Area (km^{2})	Population	Map
Aomori (capital)	青森市	824.61	264,945	
Goshogawara	五所川原市	404.20	51,578	
Hachinohe	八戸市	305.56	212,279	
Hirakawa	平川市	346.01	30,086	
Hirosaki	弘前市	524.20	157,031	
Kuroishi	黒石市	217.05	31,540	
Misawa	三沢市	119.39	37,065	
Mutsu	むつ市	864.20	50,589	
Towada	十和田市	725.65	56,766	
Tsugaru	つがる市	253.55	30,128	

==== Towns and villages ====
These are the towns and villages in each district:

Name		Area (km^{2})	Population	District	Map
Rōmaji	Kanji	Area (km^{2})	Population	District	Map
Ajigasawa	鰺ヶ沢町	343.08	8,250	Nishitsugaru District	
Fujisaki	藤崎町	37.29	14,558	Minamitsugaru District	
Fukaura	深浦町	488.91	6,579	Nishitsugaru District	
Gonohe	五戸町	177.67	14,977	Sannohe District	
Hashikami	階上町	94.00	12,345	Sannohe District	
Higashidōri	東通村	295.32	5,415	Shimokita District	
Hiranai	平内町	217.09	9,616	Higashitsugaru District	
Imabetsu	今別町	125.27	2,311	Higashitsugaru District	
Inakadate	田舎館村	22.35	7,420	Minamitsugaru District	
Itayanagi	板柳町	41.88	12,686	Kitatsugaru District	
Kazamaura	風間浦村	69.466	1,491	Shimokita District	
Nakadomari	中泊町	216.34	9,981	Kitatsugaru District	
Nanbu	南部町	153.12	15,922	Sannohe District	
Nishimeya	西目屋村	246.02	1,160	Nakatsugaru District	
Noheji	野辺地町	81.68	11,539	Kamikita District	
Oirase	おいらせ町	71.96	25,026	Kamikita District	
Ōma	大間町	52.09	4,565	Shimokita District	
Ōwani	大鰐町	163.43	8,009	Minamitsugaru District	
Rokkasho	六ヶ所村	252.68	9,559	Kamikita District	
Rokunohe	六戸町	83.89	10,439	Kamikita District	
Sai	佐井村	135.05	1,572	Shimokita District	
Sannohe	三戸町	151.79	8,561	Sannohe District	
Shichinohe	七戸町	337.23	13,671	Kamikita District	
Shingō	新郷村	150.77	1,965	Sannohe District	
Sotogahama	外ヶ浜町	230.30	4,775	Higashitsugaru District	
Takko	田子町	241.98	4,592	Sannohe District	
Tōhoku	東北町	326.50	15,795	Kamikita District	
Tsuruta	鶴田町	46.43	11,968	Kitatsugaru District	
Yokohama	横浜町	126.38	3,937	Kamikita District	
Yomogita	蓬田村	80.84	2,570	Higashitsugaru District	

Largest cities in Aomori Prefecture Source:
Rank		Pop.
1	Aomori City	275,192
2	Hachinohe	223,415
3	Hirosaki	168,466
4	Towada	60,378
5	Mutsu	54,103
6	Goshogawara	51,415
7	Misawa	39,152
8	Kuroishi	31,946
9	Tsugaru	30,934
10	Hirakawa	30,567

=== Climate ===
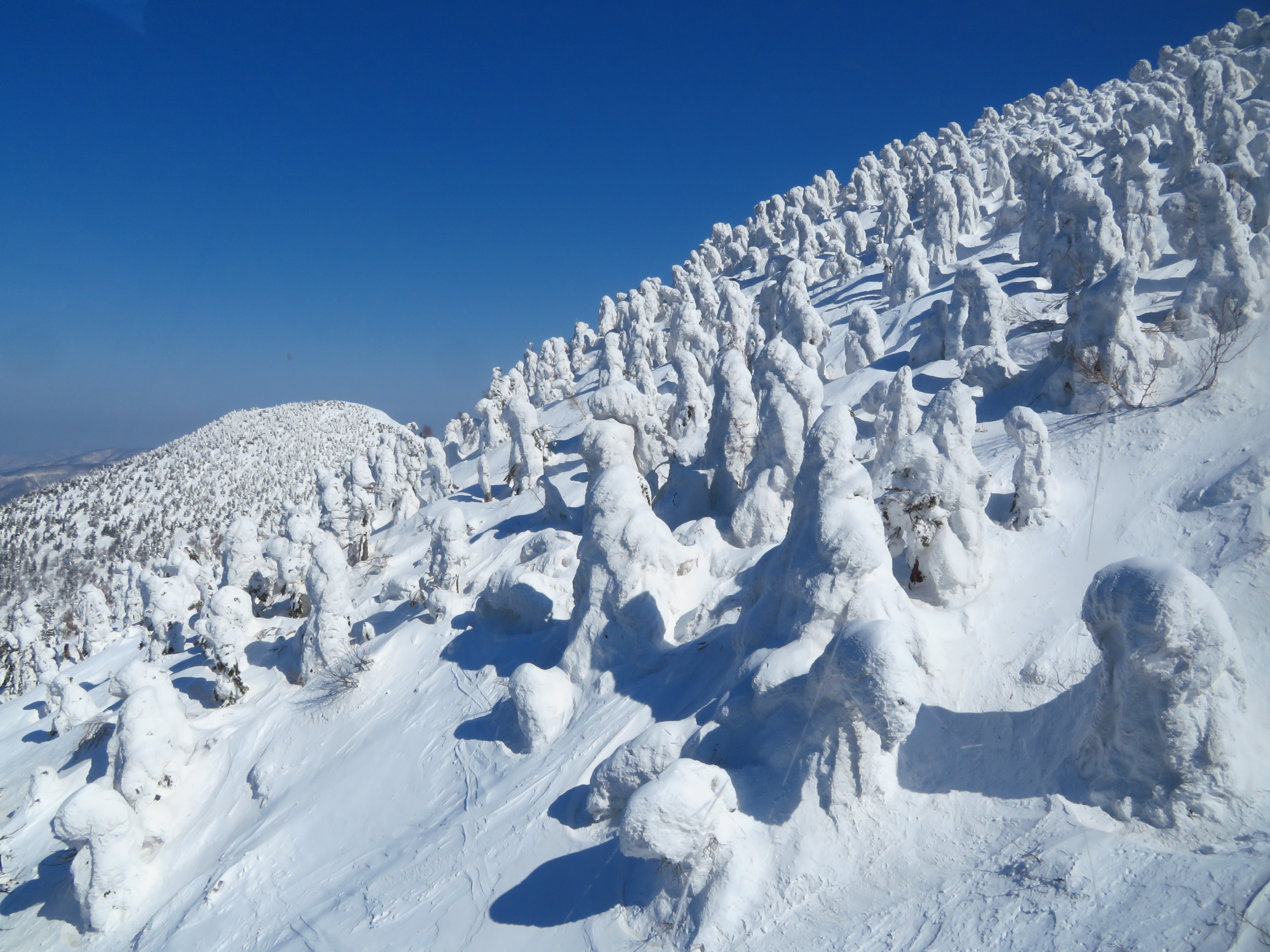
"Snow monsters" in the Hakkōda Mountains

Aomori Prefecture has four distinct seasons, with an average annual temperature of 10 °C (50 °F). Variations in climate exist between the eastern (Pacific Ocean) and the western (Sea of Japan) parts of the prefecture. This is in part due to the Ōu Mountains that run north to south in the middle of the prefecture, dividing the two regions. The western side is subject to heavy monsoons and receives little sunshine; it experiences heavy snowfall during the winter. The eastern side is subject to low clouds brought in by northeasterly winds during the summer months, known locally as Yamase winds, from June through August, with temperatures staying relatively low. There are instances of Yamase winds making summers so cold that food production is hindered. The lowest recorded temperature during the winter is −9.3 °C (15.3 °F), and the highest recorded temperature during the summer is 33.1 °C (91.6 °F). The city of Aomori and the surrounding areas are known for having the heaviest snowfall in the world. In 2016, AccuWeather ranked Aomori as the snowiest city in the world.

Aomori Prefecture's typically heavy snowfalls are caused by cold dry air from Siberian masses moving south, reaching the Sea of Japan, where they pick up significant amounts of moisture, thereby causing heavy snowfalls when they reach Japan's mountains. The Kuroshio Current is a major cause of the warm ocean waters in the area. Climate change in Aomori Prefecture is impacting its snowy winters and affecting water resources and marine life. Steady average temperature increases have been occurring in Aomori Prefecture since the early 1980s. Trends show decreasing seasonal snowfall and a shift in river runoff timing, potentially leading to water supply issues for agriculture during the spring. Warming ocean temperatures are impacting local fisheries, specifically with the potential to harm the cold-water seaweed kombu. The prefecture's historically heavy winters are known for creating "snow monsters" (樹氷, juhyo), also known as rime ice. Climate change has steadily made it more difficult to find instances of "snow monsters".

==== Temperature comparison ====
Monthly average highs and lows for various cities and towns in Aomori Prefecture in Fahrenheit and Celsius
City	Jan	Feb	Mar	Apr	May	Jun	Jul	Aug	Sep	Oct	Nov	Dec
Aomori	1.8 / −3.5 (35.2 / 25.7)	2.7 / −3.3 (36.9 / 26.1)	6.8 / −0.8 (44.2 / 30.6)	13.7 / 4.1 (56.7 / 39.4)	18.8 / 9.4 (65.8 / 48.9)	22.1 / 14.1 (71.8 / 57.4)	26.0 / 18.6 (78.8 / 65.5)	27.8 / 20.0 (82.0 / 68.0)	24.5 / 15.8 (76.1 / 60.4)	18.3 / 9.1 (64.9 / 48.4)	11.2 / 3.4 (52.2 / 38.1)	4.5 / −1.4 (40.1 / 29.5)
Hachinohe	2.8 / −3.9 (37.0 / 25.0)	3.6 / −3.7 (38.5 / 25.3)	7.6 / −0.9 (45.7 / 30.4)	13.8 / 4.0 (56.8 / 39.2)	18.7 / 9.2 (65.7 / 48.6)	21.1 / 13.3 (70.0 / 55.9)	24.9 / 17.7 (76.8 / 63.9)	26.5 / 19.5 (79.7 / 67.1)	23.6 / 15.7 (74.5 / 60.3)	18.2 / 9.0 (64.8 / 48.2)	11.9 / 3.0 (53.4 / 37.4)	5.4 / −1.6 (41.7 / 29.1)
Mutsu	1.8 / −4.9 (35.2 / 23.2)	2.4 / −4.9 (36.3 / 23.2)	6.3 / −2.0 (43.3 / 28.4)	12.7 / 2.8 (54.9 / 37.0)	17.8 / 7.8 (64.0 / 46.0)	20.8 / 12.2 (69.4 / 54.0)	24.1 / 16.9 (75.4 / 62.4)	25.8 / 18.4 (78.4 / 65.1)	23.2 / 14.2 (73.8 / 57.6)	17.6 / 7.2 (63.7 / 45.0)	10.9 / 2.1 (51.6 / 35.8)	4.4 / −2.5 (39.9 / 27.5)
Fukaura	2.3 / −2.4 (36.1 / 27.7)	3.0 / −2.2 (37.4 / 28.0)	6.7 / 0.1 (44.1 / 32.2)	12.7 / 4.5 (54.9 / 40.1)	17.8 / 9.6 (64.0 / 49.3)	21.6 / 14.1 (70.9 / 57.4)	25.3 / 18.7 (77.5 / 65.7)	27.1 / 20.0 (80.8 / 68.0)	23.6 / 15.9 (74.5 / 60.6)	17.5 / 10.0 (63.5 / 50.0)	11.1 / 4.7 (52.0 / 40.5)	5.1 / −0.3 (41.2 / 31.5)
Ōma	2.2 / −2.4 (36.0 / 27.7)	2.7 / −2.3 (36.9 / 27.9)	6.2 / 0.0 (43.2 / 32.0)	11.0 / 4.1 (51.8 / 39.4)	15.0 / 8.5 (59.0 / 47.3)	18.4 / 12.4 (65.1 / 54.3)	22.3 / 16.9 (72.1 / 62.4)	24.8 / 19.1 (76.6 / 66.4)	22.8 / 16.0 (73.0 / 60.8)	17.4 / 10.3 (63.3 / 50.5)	11.0 / 4.8 (51.8 / 40.6)	4.8 / −0.3 (40.6 / 31.5)
Sukayu Onsen	−5.1 / −10.0 (22.8 / 14.0)	−4.3 / −9.8 (24.3 / 14.4)	−0.2 / −6.8 (31.6 / 19.8)	6.4 / −0.8 (43.5 / 30.6)	13.1 / 5.1 (55.6 / 41.2)	17.6 / 9.8 (63.7 / 49.6)	21.1 / 14.6 (70.0 / 58.3)	21.9 / 15.3 (71.4 / 59.5)	17.7 / 10.7 (63.9 / 51.3)	11.4 / 4.2 (52.5 / 39.6)	4.5 / −2.0 (40.1 / 28.4)	−2.2 / −7.6 (28.0 / 18.3)

== Demographics ==
Aomori Prefecture Population
Year	Pop.	±% p.a.
1880	475,413	—
1890	545,026	+1.38%
1903	665,691	+1.55%
1913	764,485	+1.39%
1920	756,454	−0.15%
1925	812,977	+1.45%
1930	879,914	+1.60%
1935	967,129	+1.91%
1940	1,000,509	+0.68%
1945	1,083,250	+1.60%
1950	1,282,867	+3.44%
1955	1,382,523	+1.51%
1960	1,426,606	+0.63%
1965	1,416,591	−0.14%
1970	1,427,520	+0.15%
1975	1,468,646	+0.57%
1980	1,523,907	+0.74%
1985	1,524,448	+0.01%
1990	1,482,873	−0.55%
1995	1,481,663	−0.02%
2000	1,475,728	−0.08%
2005	1,436,657	−0.54%
2010	1,373,339	−0.90%
2015	1,308,649	−0.96%
2020	1,237,984	−1.10%

A person living in or from Aomori Prefecture is referred to as an Aomorian in English. As of 2020, the prefecture had a total population of 1.23 million residents, accounting for just over 1 percent of Japan's total population. Approximately 45 percent of Aomori Prefecture's residents live in its two core cities, Aomori and Hachinohe, on its coastal plains. The majority of the prefecture is covered in forested mountain ranges, with population centers occupying valleys and plains. Aomori is the third-most populous prefecture in the Tōhoku region, after Miyagi Prefecture and Fukushima Prefecture.

Aomori Prefecture's population grew until the late 20th century; it peaked at 1.52 million in 1985, dropped to 1.23 million by 2020 and by 2023 was 1.19 million. Japan's population growth rate started declining in 1970 and the total population peaked in 2010 at 128 million; dropping to 123.3 million by 2025. Aomori Prefecture has the 5th highest percentage of population of seniors among all prefectures at 34.8 percent. This percentage is expected to be 46.8 percent by 2045, resulting in the prefecture having the second highest rate above age 65 by then. The total population is expected to fall by 35 percent by 2050. The prefecture's declining total fertility rate (TFR) was 6.32 in 1925, but by 2008 it had fallen to 2.04. In 2022, the prefecture's birth rate was 1.24, the lowest in its recorded history.

In 2018, Aomori Prefecture saw the second largest decrease in the number of Japanese citizens out of any prefecture in the country. Only neighboring Akita Prefecture lost more citizens than Aomori Prefecture. In July 2025 the "Aomori Declaration" was issued by a meeting held in Aomori City of the National Governors' Association to address Japan's declining population, describing it as "the biggest challenge" facing the country. In 2017, 23,529 people moved out of Aomori Prefecture, while 17,454 people moved to the prefecture.

In 2020, 583,402 of the prefecture's residents were men and 654,582 were women, 10.8 percent of the population was below the age of 15, 56.6 percent of residents were between the ages of 15 and 64, and 32.6 percent was above the age of 64. In the same year the prefecture had a density of 130.9 people per square kilometer. Japan is noted for long lifespans, however Aomori Prefecture has the lowest male and female life expectancy of the whole country, for which high salt consumption and low physical activity are factors.

In 2020, Aomori Prefecture had the fifth lowest ratio of foreign immigrants of all Japan's prefectures. Scholars suggest that immigration is not expected to reverse the prefecture's population decline. In 2007, Aomori Prefecture had the 7th lowest number of international marriages among all of Japan's prefectures, with only 664 marriages where one of the spouses was a foreigner. Efforts have been made to attract more foreign workers to address the labor shortage but so far these efforts have been insufficient to meet needs.

== Economy ==
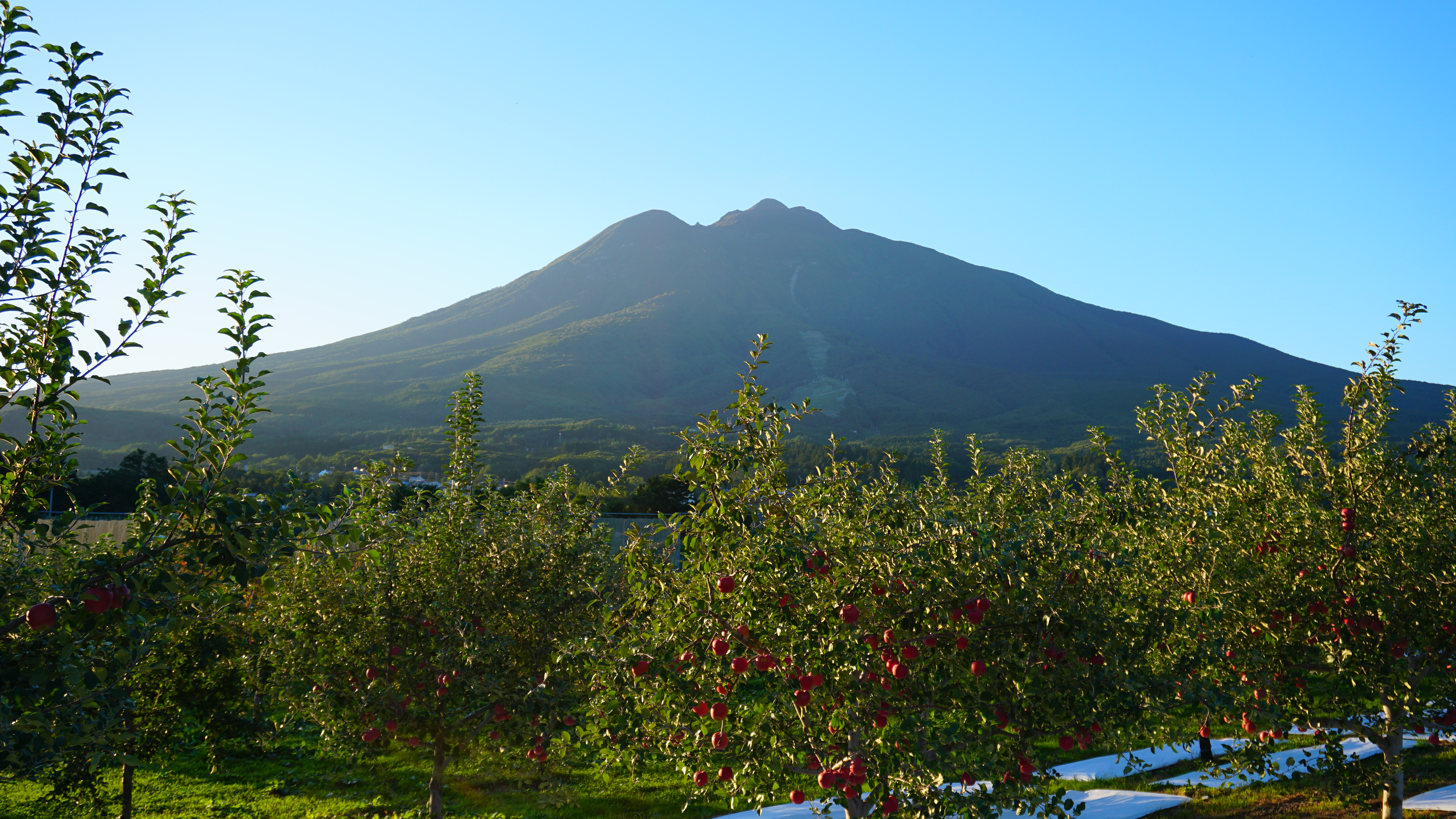
Apple orchards in the foothills of Mount Iwaki

Like much of the Tōhoku Region, Aomori Prefecture remains dominated by primary sector industries, such as farming, forestry and fishing. The prefecture's forestry industry is centered around the cultivation and harvesting of hiba, a cypress tree utilized in construction of wooden structures across the country. In 2021, its economy had a GDP of 4,464 billion yen, which represented about 0.8 percent of Japan's economy. Aomori Prefecture generates the largest amount of wind energy out of the prefectures of Japan, with large wind farms located on the Shimokita Peninsula and Tsugaru. The peninsula is also home to the inactive Rokkasho Reprocessing Plant that is owned by Japan Nuclear Fuel Limited, a company headquartered in the village of Rokkasho that is involved in the production of nuclear fuel, as well as the reprocessing, storage, and disposal of nuclear waste. In July 2024, the governor of Aomori Prefecture announced the approval of a nuclear waste storage facility in town of Mutsu. The city of Hachinohe is home to the Pacific Metals Company, a manufacturer of ferronickel products.

=== Agriculture ===
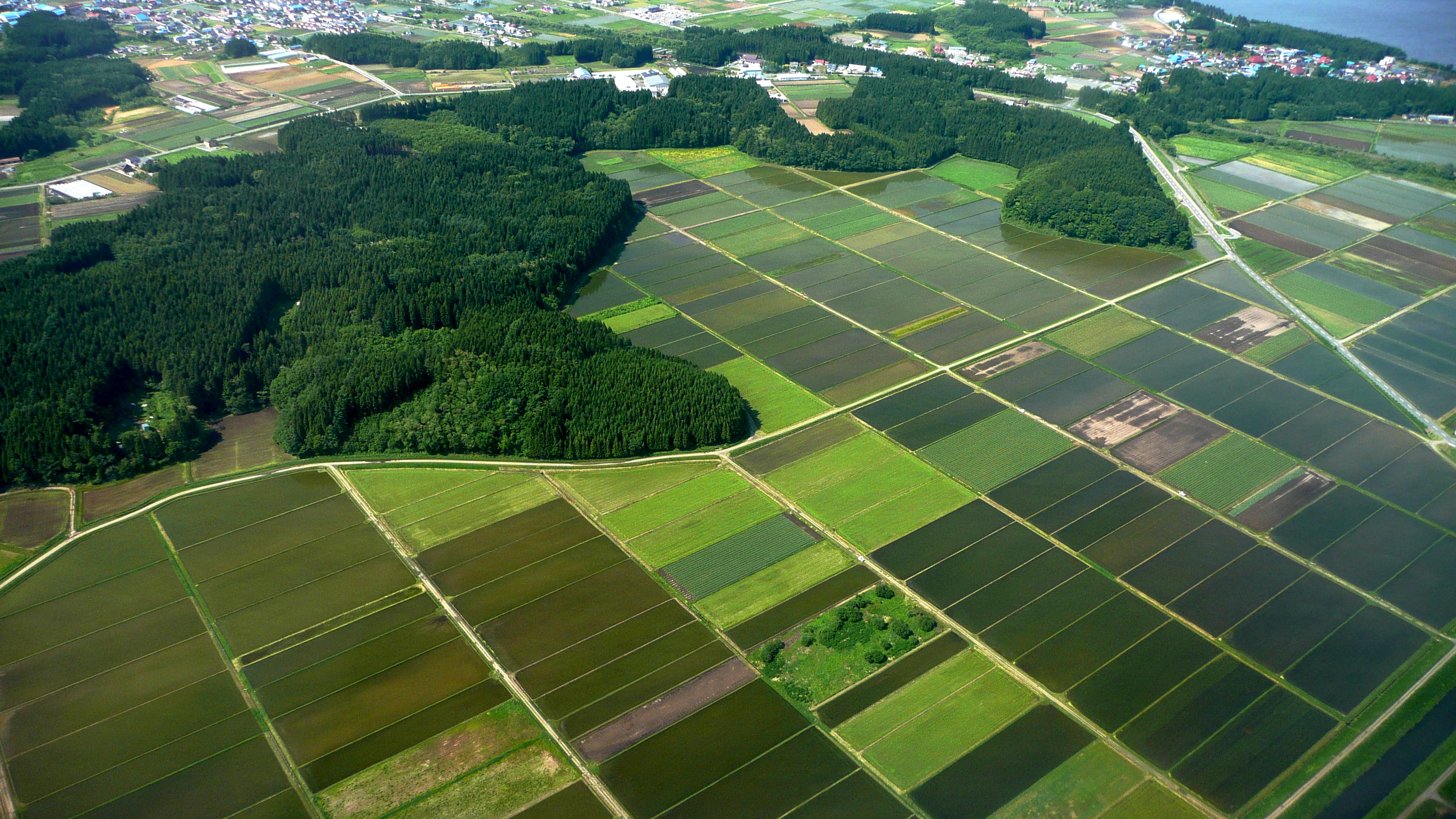
Farmland in Aomori

Aomori Prefecture is a leading agricultural region in Japan. It has Japan's largest producer of apples for more than 100 years, growing about 60 percent of Japan's total apple production, producing 50 million tons yearly. The cultivation of apples in the prefecture began in 1875 when the prefecture was given three varieties of Western origin to grow. Most imported apple trees came from the France and United States. The apples are consumed within Japan and exported to the United States, China, Taiwan, and Thailand. Aomori Prefecture is also ranked highly in the nation's production of redcurrant, burdock, and garlic, accounting for 81, 37, and 66 percent, respectively, of the country's production. Climate change is having a negative impact on agriculture in Aomori Prefecture, especially on apples and other fruits.

Aomori Prefecture is also the center of Hakkōda cattle rearing, a rare, region-specific breed of Japanese Shorthorn. The town of Gonohe has a long history as a breeding center for horses, popular among the samurai. With the decline of the samurai, Gonohe's horses continued to be bred for their meat. The lean horse meat is coveted as a delicacy, especially when served in its raw form, known as basashi (馬刺し). The Aomori Prefecture coastline along Mutsu Bay is a large source of scallops; they are particularly a specialty of the town Hiranai, where the calm water around Natsudomari Peninsula makes a good home for them.

=== Tourism ===
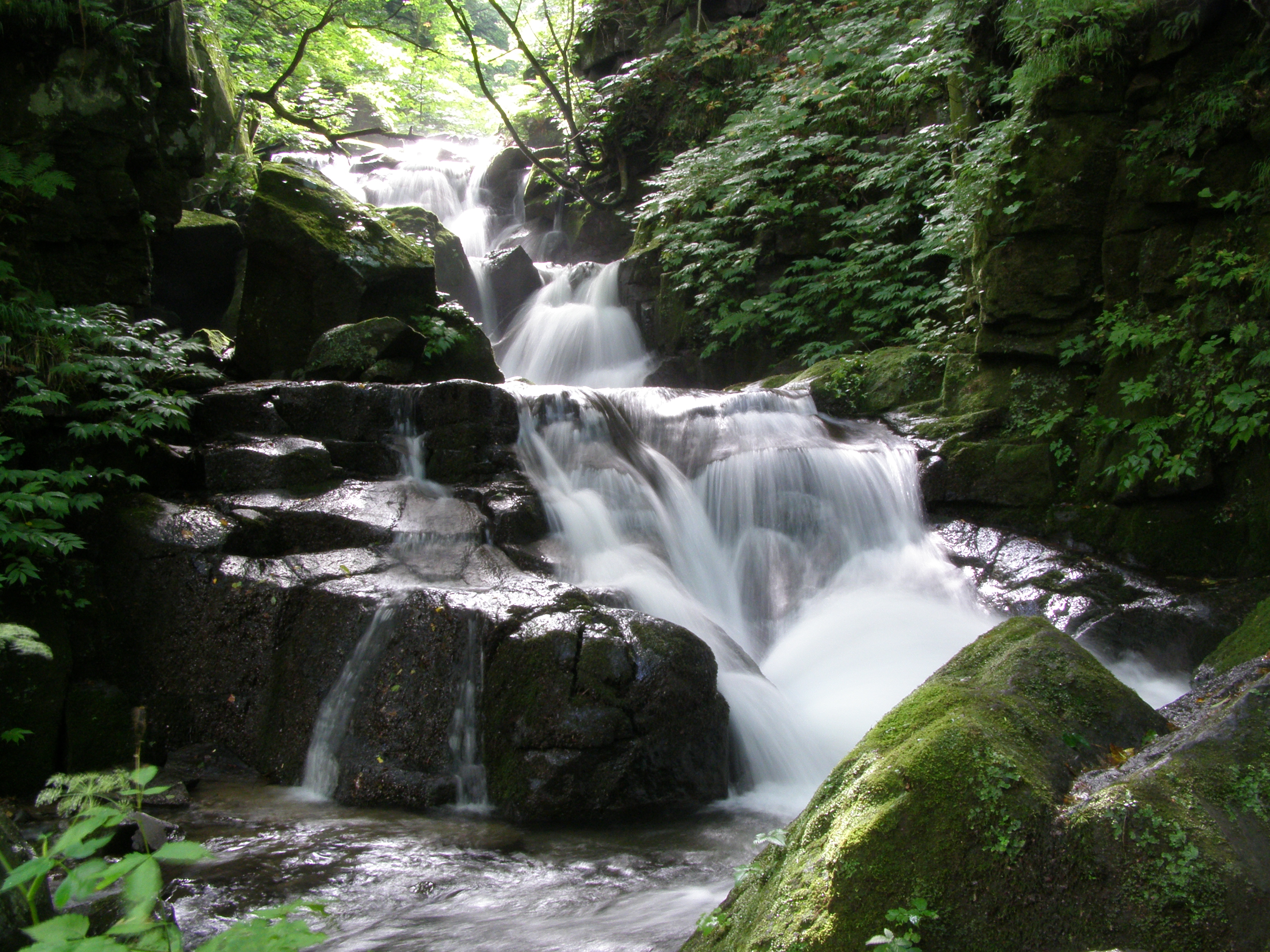
The cascades of the Oirase River in the prefecture's Towada-Hachimantai National Park

With a growth rate of 43.5%, Aomori Prefecture was among the top five prefectures of Japan in terms of growth rate in foreign tourists between 2012 and 2017. Heavy marketing of the prefecture's strong connection to the Jōmon culture significantly increased heritage tourism and kept this trend going through at least 2023. The total number of overnight visitors to the prefecture in 2019 was 5,060,000, with around 296,000 being foreigners. In terms of guest-nights, foreign visitors accounted for 356,550 nights in 2018, dipped to a low of 17,090 nights in 2021 due to COVID-19, and reached an all-time high of 435,010 in 2024.

This influx of foreign tourists has led to the construction of more hotels in Aomori Prefecture. Major draws to the prefecture are its apple industry, historic sites, museums, and national parks. Several of the prefecture's Jōmon period historic sites were nominated in January 2009 to become UNESCO World Heritage Sites and were placed on the World Heritage Tentative List. On July 27, 2021 the other Jōmon sites, totaling 17 sites, in neighboring prefectures were placed on the World Heritage Site list. These sites were the second sites in Aomori Prefecture placed on the list. The first was Shirakami-Sanchi, an area of virgin forests. Tourist access to Shirakami-Sanchi is heavily restricted due to its delicate ecosystem, though several water features, trails, and roads can be accessed by its visitors. About 35.2 million domestic travelers visited Aomori Prefecture in 2016, while about 95,000 foreign tourists visited in 2017.

=== Military ===
Aomori Prefecture and the Tsugaru Strait are of strategic value to both Japan and the United States, as the strait serves as an access point for the United States Navy into the Sea of Japan where they can put pressure on Russia, China, and North Korea. The prefecture also hosts Misawa Air Base, the only combined, joint U.S. service installation in the western Pacific servicing Army, Navy, Marine Corps, Space Force, and Air Force, as well as the Japan Self-Defense Forces.

== Culture ==
=== Crafts ===
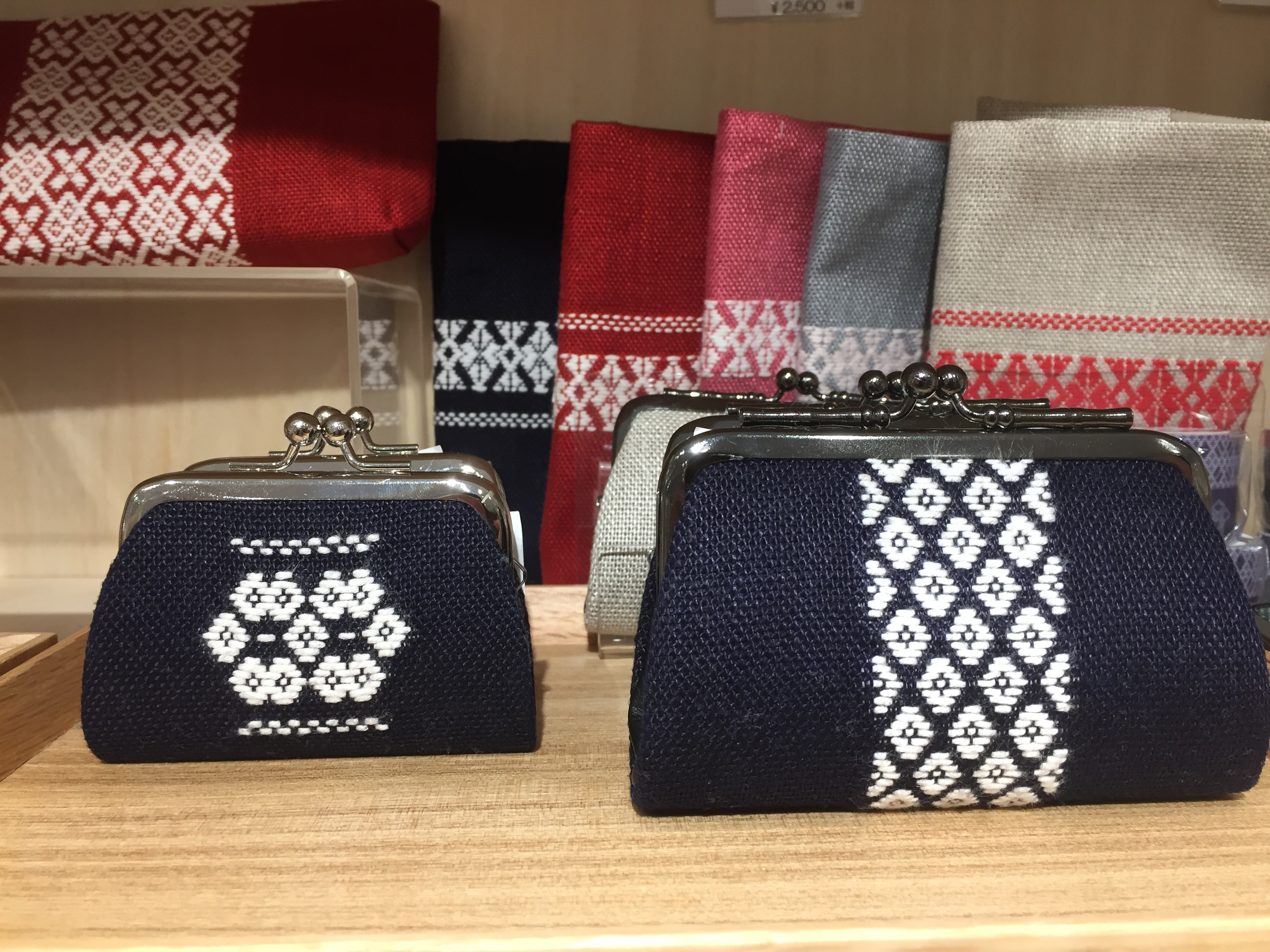
Kogin-zashi pattern examples

The Tsugaru region of Aomori Prefecture is the birthplace of the traditional Tsugaru-jamisen, a local style of music played on the shamisen (a three–stringed musical instrument). A notable player of the style was Takahashi Chikuzan, a blind musician from Hiranai, who wandered around the country and eventually gained nationwide appeal. Aomori Prefecture is also where the decorative embroidery styles, kogin-zashi and Nanbu hishizashi originated, as more utilitarian textile techniques during the Edo period. The peasant women of the area, who created the styles, used them to make linen clothing more robust and warm during the harsh winters since cotton was unavailable to the lower class. Wooden horse figures called Yawata-uma (also Hachinohe horse) Have Been Made in the Former Holdings of the Nanbu for 700 Years. Hachinohe horses are often given at celebrations as they are believed to bring good luck. Other crafts native to Aomori Prefecture include pottery, lacquerware, cabinetry, and iron working. The type of lacquerware specific to Aomori Prefecture is known as Tsugaru-Nuri.

=== Cuisine ===
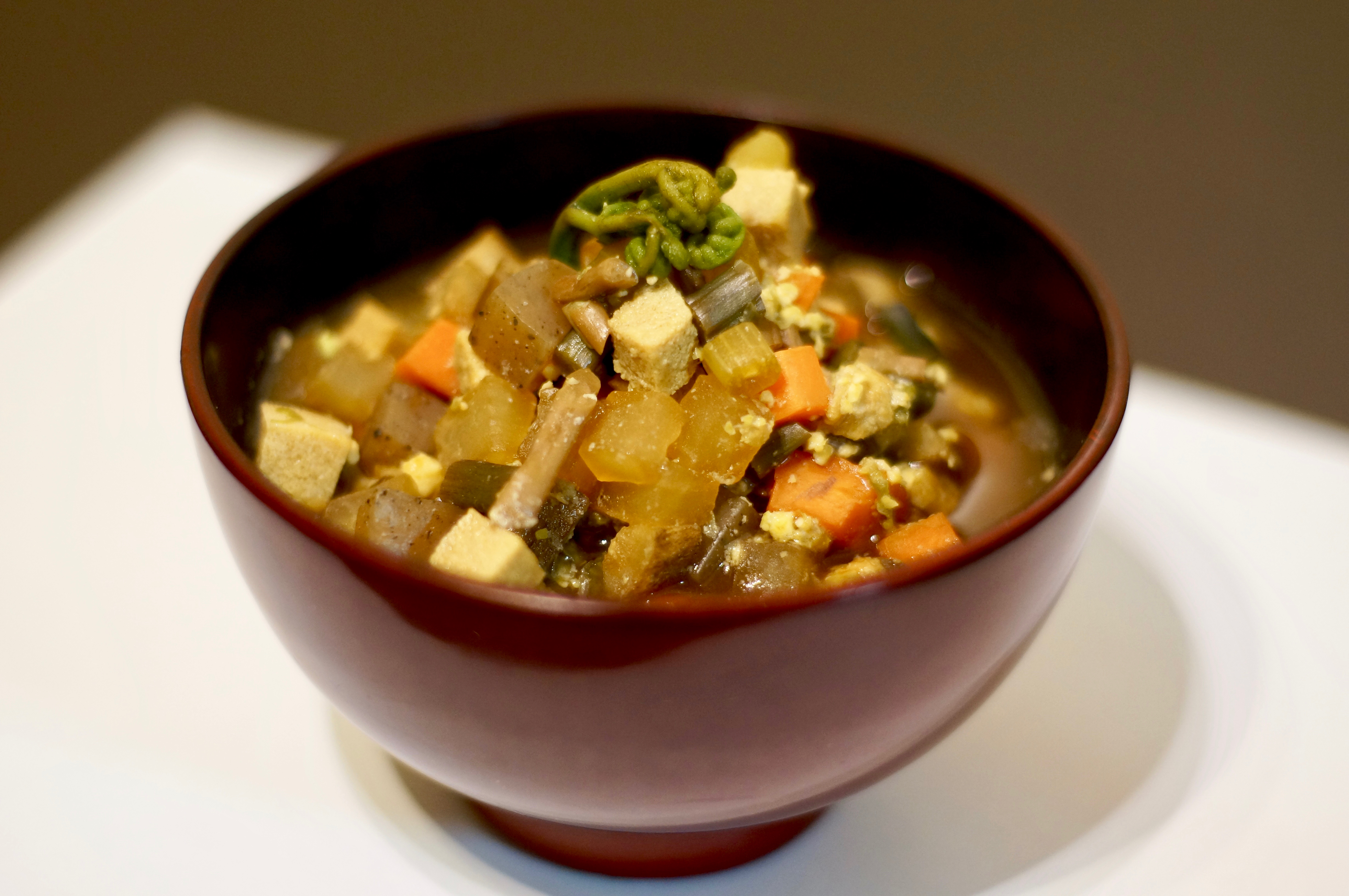
Ke porridge

Aomori Prefecture has given rise to several soups: ke porridge or Keno-jiru, which consists of miso soup with diced root vegetables and wild plants such as butterbur and bracken with tofu from the Tsugaru area; ichigoni, a sea urchin roe and abalone soup in which the sea urchin roe looks like strawberries, known as ichigo in Japanese, from the town of Hashikami; hittsumi a roux with chicken and vegetables from the Nanbu area; Hachinohe senbei soup a hearty soup with Nanbu senbei loaded with vegetables and chicken; jappa-jiru a vegetable soup with cod roe from Aomori City; and keiran a red bean dumpling soy sauce soup served during special occasions on the Shimokita Peninsula. Another dish that was created in the area surrounding Mutsu Bay is kaiya in the Tsugaru area or kayaki on the Shimokita Peninsula, it is a boiled miso and egg dish mixed with fish or scallop meat on a large scallop shell that serves as both the cookware and dishes. In 2006, the production of aged black garlic began in Aomori Prefecture. The prefecture has since become the largest producer of black garlic in Japan.

=== Festivals ===
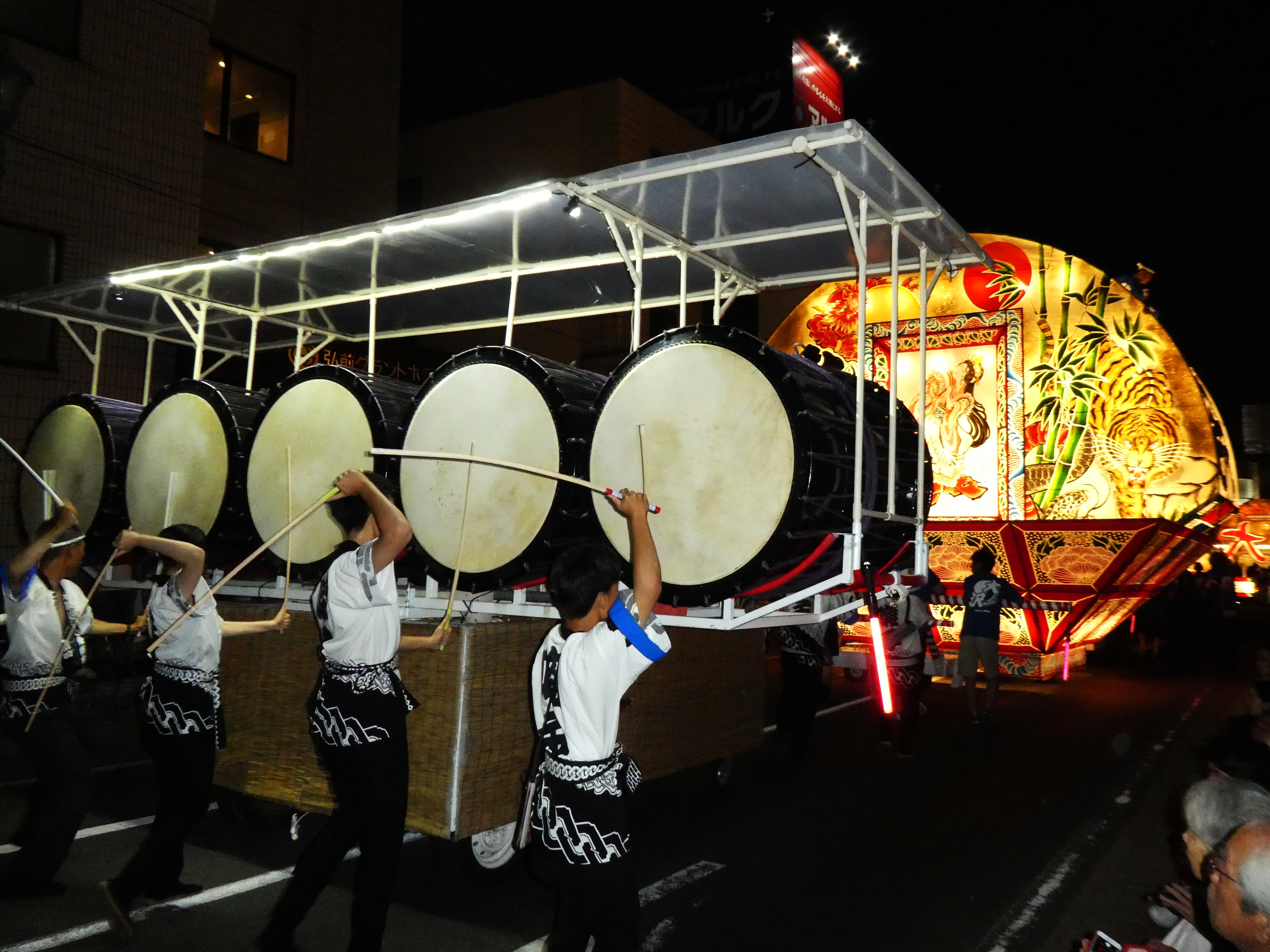
Hirosaki Neputa Festival

Aomori Prefecture hosts the Aomori Nebuta Matsuri, one of the Three Great Festivals of Tōhoku annually in early August. The other two Great Festivals are Akita Kanto and the Sendai Tanabata, which are held elsewhere in Tōhoku. During late April, hanami festivals are held across the prefecture, with the most prominent being located on the grounds of Hirosaki Castle. Many unique festivals are held during summer with bright lights, floats, dancing and music; including Aomori Nebuta Matsuri as well as several other iterations of the festival throughout the towns and cities of the prefecture. Winter is centered on snow festivals where attendees can view ice sculptures and eat local cuisine inside ice huts. Tsugaru's festivals tie in to its past and are more rural and community in nature than religious; even though they mix Shinto and Buddhist practices as well as music and dance.

=== Arts and literature ===
Osamu Dazai, the writer of Japan's second most popular novel No Longer Human, is one of the prefecture's best-known writers. Shunsuke Kikuchi, a composer for series such as Dragon Ball and Doraemon, was born in the city of Hirosaki. The creator of the supernatural manga series Shaman King, Hiroyuki Takei, is from the village of Yomogita in northwestern Aomori Prefecture. The comedian Daimaō Kosaka, known widely for his viral single "PPAP (Pen-Pineapple-Apple-Pen)", was born in Aomori Prefecture. Sōsaku-hanga artist Shikō Munakata was born in Aomori City. Much of his art was inspired by the prefecture's natural qualities and rural culture.

=== Religion ===
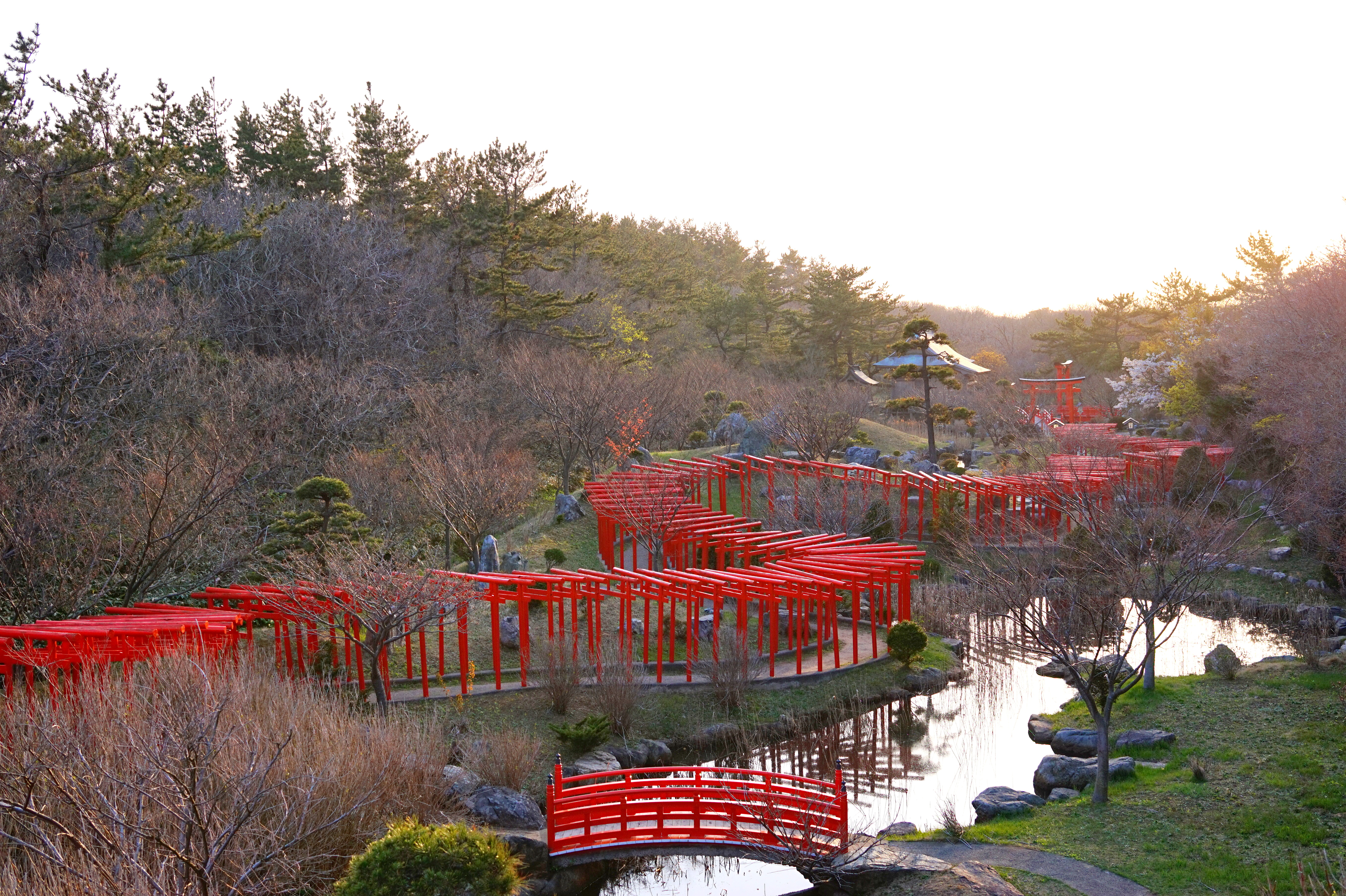
Takayama Inari Shrine in Tsugaru

Japanese religious beliefs are very syncretic, known as Shinbutsu-shūgō. About 95 percent of the population is either Buddhist or Shinto. The formal separation of those two religions did not occur until the late 19th century and is known as Shinbutsu bunri. This began occurring during the Meiji Restoration when a series of laws began to be passed. There is no agreement among modern theologians as to the degree of melding of the two religions. Christianity comprises about 1-2 percent of the population of Japan. The Christian population is concentrated mostly in Tokyo and western Japan. In Aomori Prefecture in 2018, there were only 5,582 Christians out of a populations of about 1.2 million.

The Takayama Inari Shrine is a Shinto shrine located in Tsugaru. People come here to offer prayers on behalf of business prosperity, plentiful harvests, and maritime safety. There is a memorial with a Christian cross dedicated to American sailors who died when the Cheseborough ran aground in a typhoon at Shariki, Aomori in 1889.

Mount Osore, located on the Shimokita Peninsula of the prefecture, is covered with a barren landscape, jagged rock formations, and smells of sulfuric gases. It is considered a gateway to the underworld in some belief systems. The Bodai-ji Temple is located here and it specializes in taking care of the dead and is the traditional home to the itako blind mediums who connect with the dead.

==== Blind mediums ====
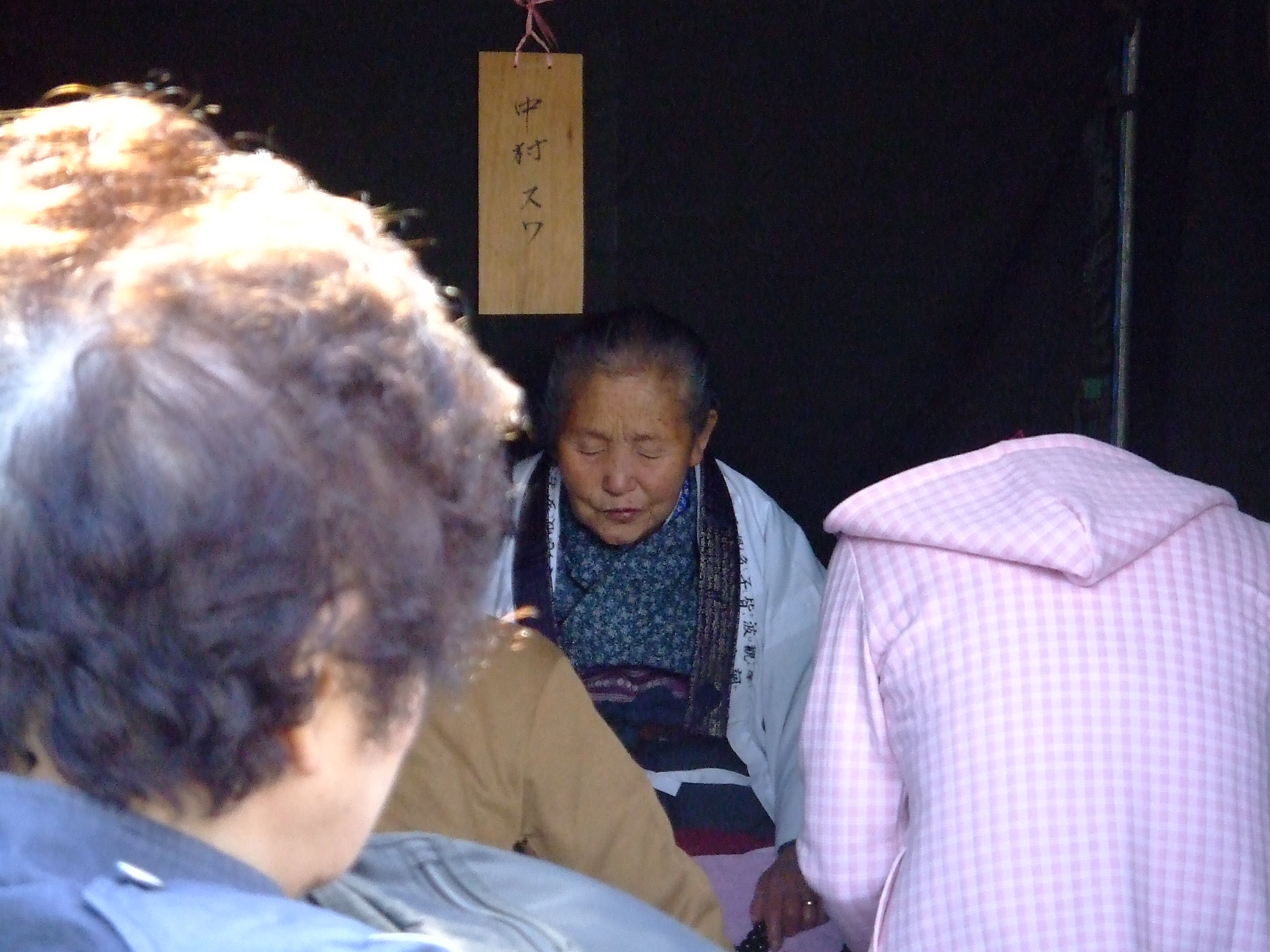
An itako at the autumn Inako Taisai festival at Mount Osore, Aomori Prefecture

Itako, also known as ichiko or ogamisama, are blind women who train to become spiritual mediums in Japan. They are strongly associated with Aomori Prefecture and today they are most commonly associated with the Mt. Osore area of the prefecture. Itako have traditionally gathered there for an annual festival to channel the dead. Itako perform ceremonies to communicate with spirits of the recently deceased, including those of aborted and stillborn children.

The tradition of itako arose because in earlier times the prefecture had very poor nutrition and sanitation, causing many children to go blind. In order for these children to be able to make a living, the females were trained as itako and the males for professions such as acupuncture, massage, moxibustion, and playing shamisen. Blindness has long been associated with spiritual powers in Japan.

Itako training traditionally began at a very young age, and included ritualized exposure to cold water. Hundreds of buckets of ice water could be poured on their bodies over the course of a few days. This education for itako takes about three years, and also includes memorization of songs and sutras. This training involves severe ascetic practices, after which the woman is said to be able to communicate with Japanese Shinto spirits, kami, and the spirits of the dead. At the end of this training, a ceremony is held, announcing the marriage of the itako and her patron spirit. Itako perform rituals tied to communication with the dead and divination. In the 1950s to 1970s there were still dozens of itako in the prefecture. The practice has been on the decline since then. As of 2009, there were only 20 living itako in Japan, all more than 40 years old.

==== Tomb of Christ ====
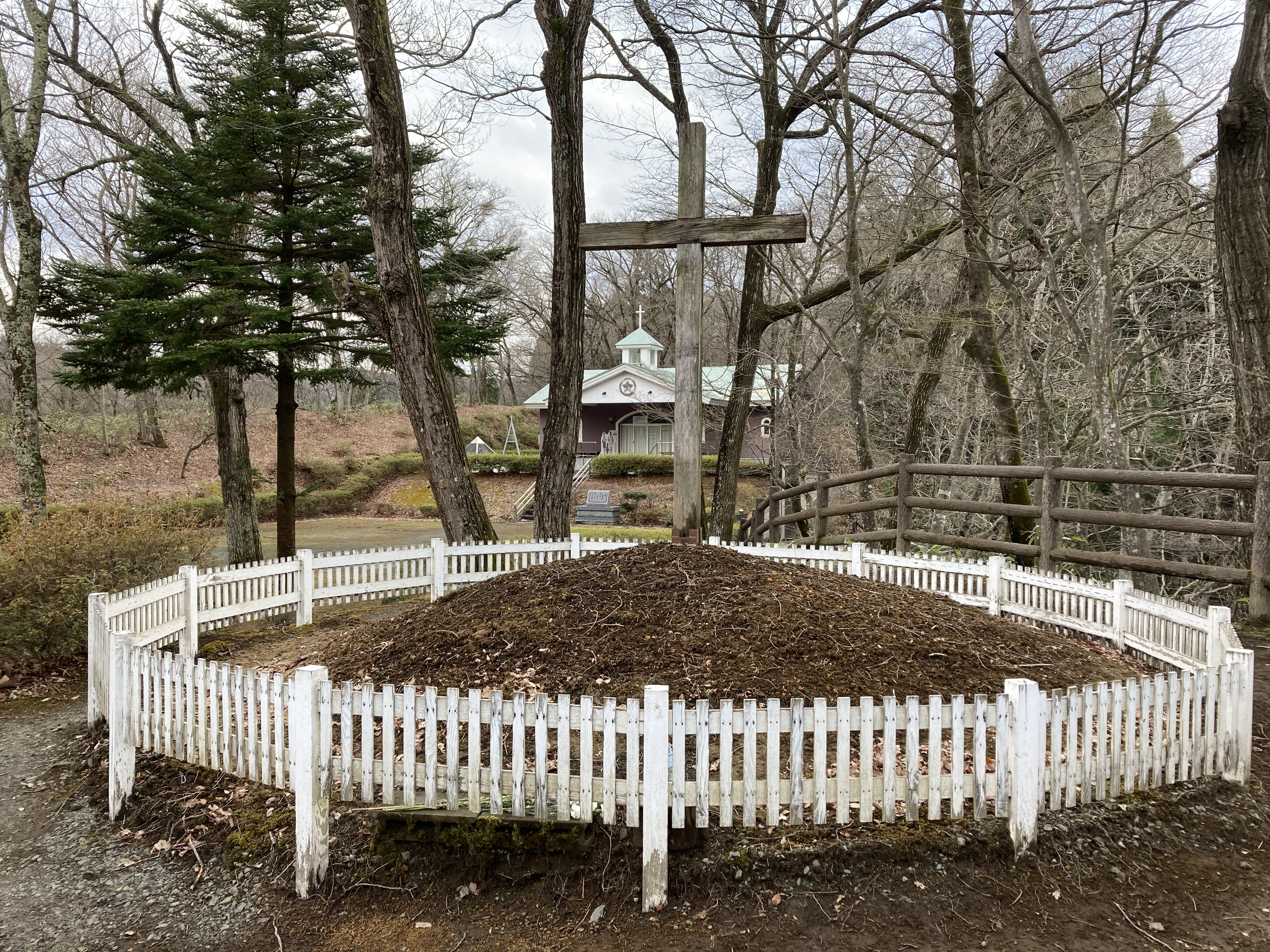
Jesus' purported gravesite

Purportedly ancient documents were published in 1935, claiming Jesus preached and died at age 106 in Shingō village in Aomori Prefecture. This is one of many claims is made in a group of documents known as the "Takeuchi documents" or "Takeuchi manuscript", which claim Jesus did not die on the cross, but rather his brother did and Jesus made his way to Aomori Prefecture via Siberia. According to the documents, Jesus then married a young woman named Miyuko and fathered three daughters. During this time he trained for 12 years and then began to spread Christianity. Historian and literature professor Kokichi Kano examined the Takeuchi documents in 1935 and proved them modern forgeries. His purported grave is in Shingō has become a tourist attraction and 20,000-30,000 visitors see it every year. In June 1964 an annual festival began being held at the gravesite. Jesus' eldest purported daughter married into the Sawaguchi family and there are still members of that family who claim non-Asian physical characteristics and lineage from Jesus.

=== Landmarks ===
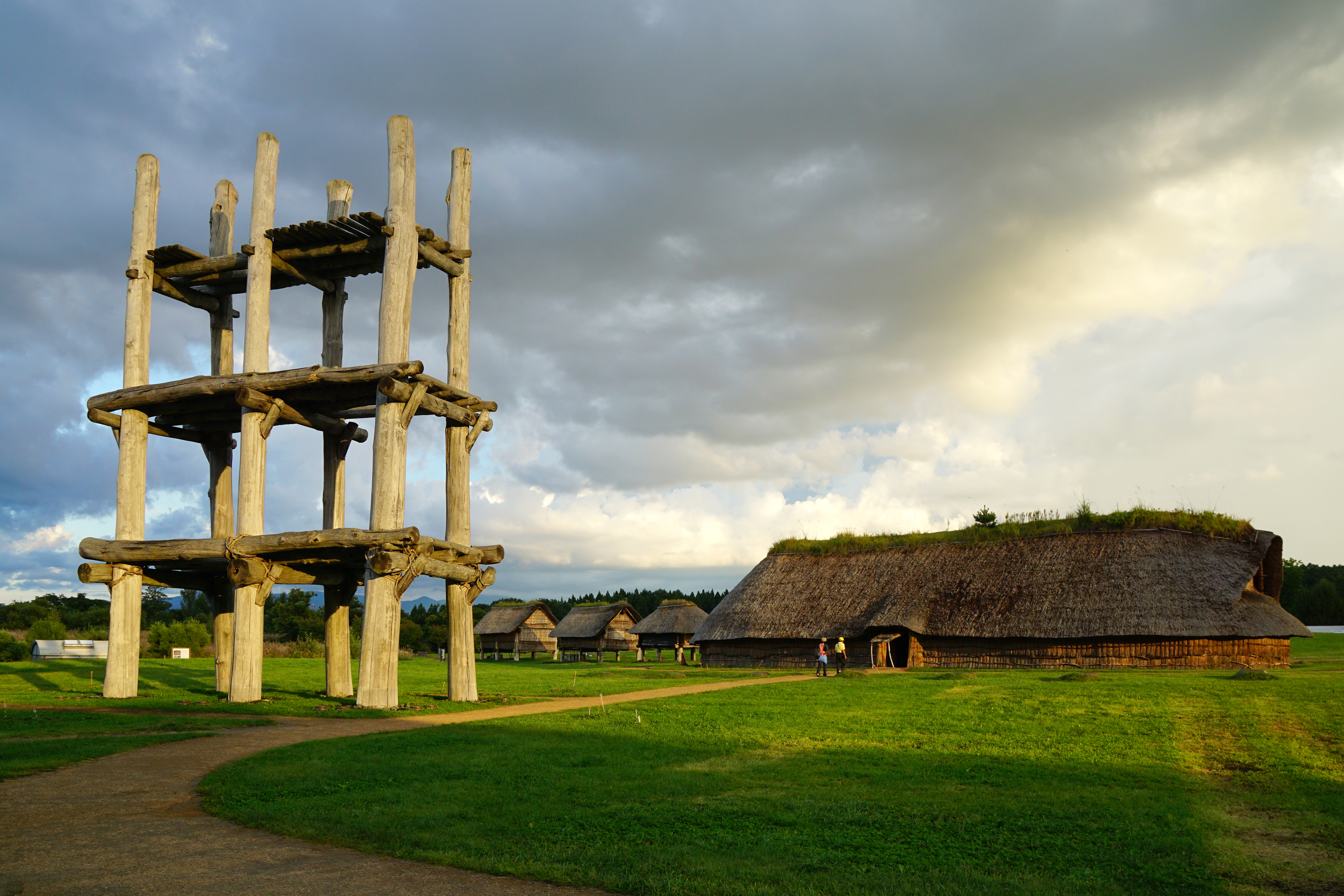
Reconstructed six-pillar structure and long pit-dwelling at Sannai-Maruyama Site

Hirosaki Castle was the seat of the Tsugaru clan; it was constructed in 1611. It is the only castle in the Tōhoku region from the Edo period that is still standing and is located in the western part of the prefecture. Festivals held on the grounds of Hirosaki Castle include the Cherry Blossom Festival and Snow Lantern Festival.

The Sannai-Maruyama Site is an early-middle Jōmon period site where thousands of artifacts have been found. It is located in Sannai, Aomori City. It was designated as a Special National Historical Site of Japan in 2000, and a UNESCO World Heritage Site as part of the Jōmon Prehistoric Sites in Northern Japan collection in 2021. The site has various reconstructions of Jōmon structures, and a museum that displays and houses artifacts collected on the site, which have collectively been designated an Important Cultural Property of Japan.

Osamu Dazai Memorial Museum, also known as Shayōkan, is a museum that was formerly a writer's home built in 1907 located in Kanagi area of Goshogawara. While consisting mostly of Japanese style architecture, there are also Westen influences, such as the staircase. It is an Important Cultural Property of Japan.

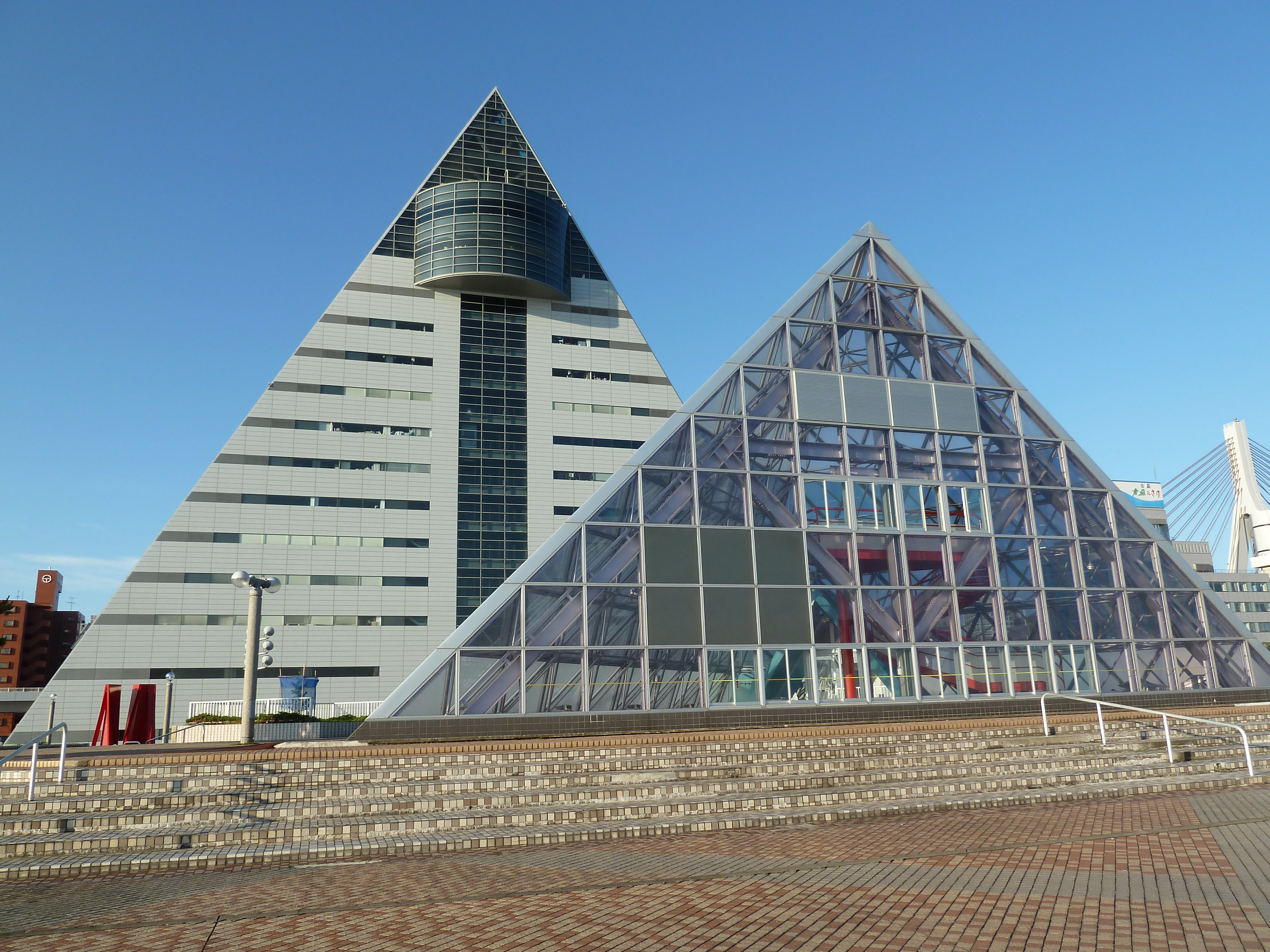
Aomori Prefecture Tourist Center

The Aomori Museum of Art is located near the Sannai-Maruyama Site, which inspired the museum's partially buried structure. It opened in 2006 focusing on highlighting the arts of northern Tōhoku. An 8.5-meter (28 ft) tall concrete sculpture of a dog has become the museum's symbol. The museum has helped increase tourism in the area and is most noted for its collection of Marc Chagall's backdrops for the play Aleko. The Towada Art Center is a set of geometric structures designed by SANAA and opened in 2008 in an effort to revitalize downtown Towada. It focuses on art that blends city structures and nature. Some of the works it holds are by Ron Mueck and Yoko Ono.

The Aomori Prefecture Tourist Center, also known as Aomori Prefecture Tourism Information Center (ASPAM: "Aomori", "Sightseeing", "Products", "Mansion"), is large triangle shaped building built in 1986 in Aomori City used to promote tourism in the prefecture. It has a 360-degree panoramic movie theater, a Kogin-zashi embroidery demonstration, apple sales, and an observatory.

=== Sports ===
The two largest cities of the prefecture, Aomori and Hachinohe, both host professional sports teams. Both cities have professional soccer clubs in the Japan Professional Football League: Aomori City's ReinMeer Aomori and Hachinohe's Vanraure Hachinohe. Other professional sports teams in the two cities include the Aomori Wat's, a basketball team from Aomori City in the B.League and the Tohoku Free Blades, an ice hockey team from Hachinohe that competes in the Asia League. Aomori Prefecture hosted the 2003 Asian Winter Games in February 2003. Approximately 1,200 athletes from 29 Asian countries participated in the games. Five venues across the prefecture held 51 different events. Aomori Prefecture is scheduled to host the 80th National Sports Festival of Japan in 2026. Aomori Prefecture was to have hosted these games in 2025, but due to the COVID-19 pandemic the games were delayed for a year. The prefecture has produced some professional athletes. Yoshisada Yonezuka from the town of Nakadomari was a martial arts instructor for USA Judo. He coached the team in the 1988 and 1992 Summer Olympics. Several ice hockey players are from Aomori, such as Masami Tanabu, who later became a politician, and Fumika Sasano.

Major professional teams
Club	Sport	League	Stadium and city
Aomori Wat's	Basketball	B.League (East Second Division)	Maeda Arena, Aomori
ReinMeer Aomori	Association football	Japan Football League (JFL)	Maeda Arena, Aomori
Tohoku Free Blades	Ice hockey	Asia League Ice Hockey	Flat Arena, Hachinohe
Vanraure Hachinohe	Association football	Japan Professional Football League (J3 League)	Prifoods Stadium, Hachinohe

Minor teams
Club	Sport	League	Stadium and city
Blancdieu Hirosaki FC	Association football	Tohoku Soccer League (Division 1)	Hirosaki Sports Park, Hirosaki
Hirosaki Areds	Baseball	Japan Amateur Baseball Association	Hirosaki
King Blizzard	Baseball	Japan Amateur Baseball Association	Goshogawara

==== Other teams ====
The Aomori Curling Club was a member of the Japan Curling Association from the city of Aomori that represented Japan in the 2006 Winter Olympics and the 2010 Winter Olympics and several World Curling Championships. The club was disbanded in 2013.

==== Sumo ====
The prefecture is known as the "kingdom of sumo" (相撲王国, sumou ōkoku) due to the success of its wrestlers in the professional divisions. Aomori is the home prefecture of yokozuna (the highest rank in sumo) Kagamisato, Wakanohana I, Tochinoumi, Wakanohana II, Takanosato, and Asahifuji. Although the prefecture is second in terms of producing the most yokozuna (behind Hokkaido), Aomori earned its title by always having at least one wrestler from the prefecture in the top makuuchi division since Ichinoya in 1883. In September 2025, this continuity was threatened when Takerufuji withdrew due to injury, forcing him to drop down to the second division jūryō for the November tournament. At the same time, however, Nishikifuji achieved a high enough score to return him to the top division, thus continuing the streak for a 142nd year. The prefecture is facing a decline in the number of professional recruits, falling from 50 natives in the 1950s, to just 10 in the 2020s.

== Government ==
Numbered map of Aomori Prefecture single-member districts

Aomori Prefecture's head of government is a governor, with the seat of the prefectural government in the city of Aomori. There are 48 members in the Aomori Prefectural Assembly, which is unicameral. Members are elected to four-year terms. In terms of national politics, the prefecture has three single-member districts: Aomori 1st district, Aomori 2nd district, Aomori 3rd district, each a constituency of the House of Representatives in the national Diet of Japan. In addition, the prefecture has two members elected from the Aomori at-large district to the House of Councillors in the Diet. The at-large members are elected to six-year terms in staggered elections every three years.

Aomori Prefecture is a stronghold of Japan's Liberal Democratic Party (LDP), though the Constitutional Democratic Party of Japan (CDP) has won some elections since its formation in 2017. One of Aomori Prefecture's notable politicians is LDP member Tadamori Ōshima, who served as the Minister of Education, Culture, Sports, Science and Technology (2000-2002), Minister of Agriculture, Forestry and Fisheries (2002-2003), and Speaker of the House of Representatives of Japan (2015-2021). He also held several leadership positions in the LDP.

== Education ==
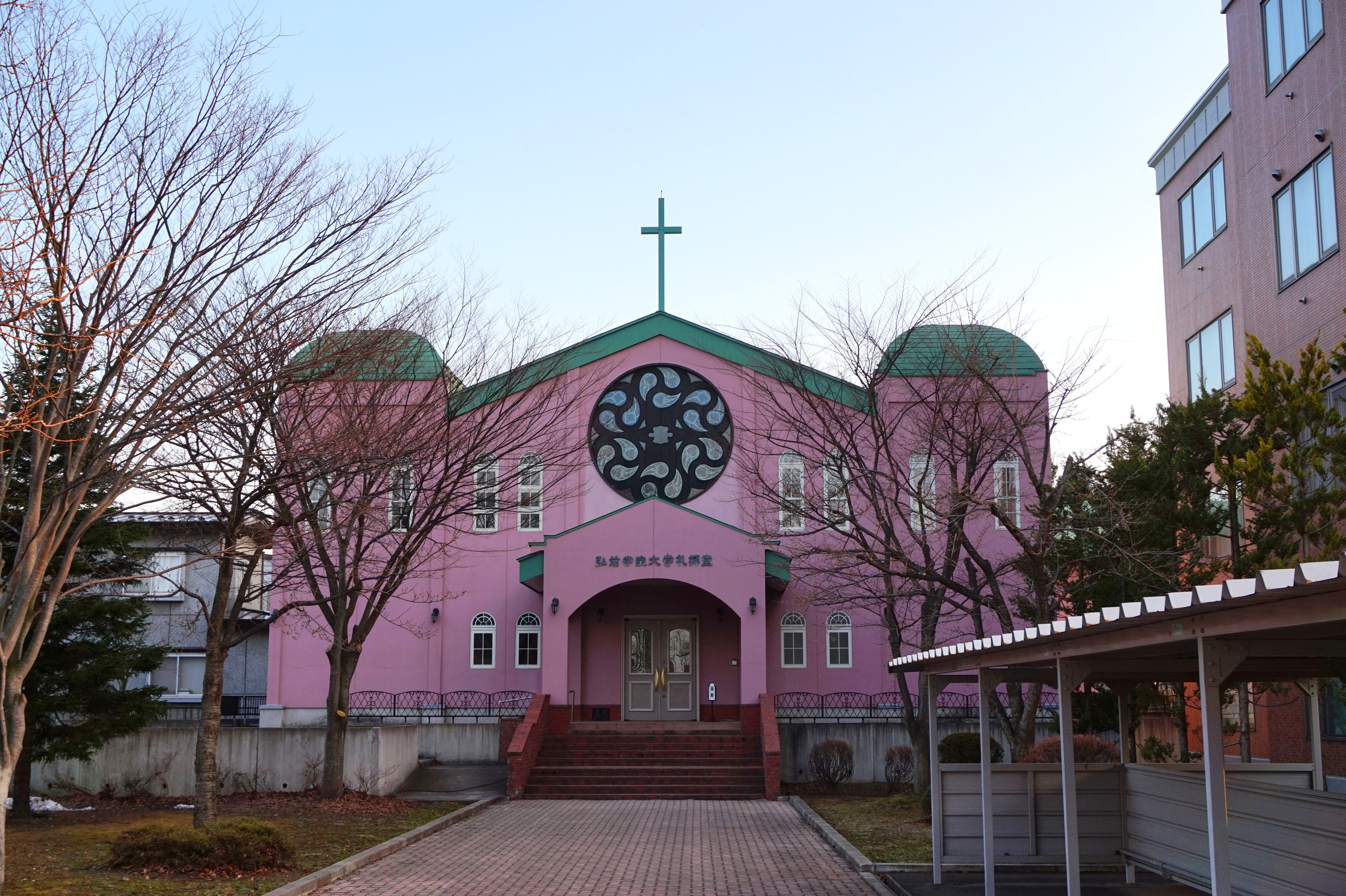
Hirosaki Gakuin University Chapel

Aomori Prefecture's most prominent university is Hirosaki University, which was formed by the combination of several colleges and higher education schools in 1949 in accordance with the National School Establishment Law of 1949. The prefecture has two other public universities, Aomori Public University and the Aomori University of Health and Welfare. Several private universities are also located in Aomori Prefecture. Among them are Aomori University, Hachinohe Gakuin University, Hachinohe Institute of Technology, Hirosaki Gakuin University, Hirosaki University of Health and Welfare, Tohoku Women's College, and the Towada Campus of Kitasato University.

The Aomori Prefecture Board of Education oversees various aspects of the prefecture's educational system including the management of libraries, the Aomori Prefectural Museum, and various educational support offices and centers. The declining population has resulted in significant decreases in the number of schools and enrollment, but with a slight increase in the budget due to rising costs. The prefecture allocated 130.3 billion yen towards education in 2018 and 131.8 billion yen in 2025. In 2017 the prefecture's public school system was teaching 133,507 students, a sharp decrease from a total of 173,537 students ten years earlier. By 2024 the enrollment dropped to 126,406 students. Overall in 2018, the prefecture had 94 kindergartens (1 of which is a national school and 3 that are public), 289 elementary schools (1 of which is a national school and 288 that are run by municipal governments), 161 middle schools (1 of which is a national school, another which is run by the prefecture, 4 that are private, and 155 that are run by municipal governments), and 95 high schools. By 2025 the number of schools had dropped to 242 elementary schools (1 national, 241 municipal), 151 middle schools (national: 1, prefectural: 1, municipal: 143, private: 6), and 1 cumpulsory school; with the number of high schools dropping to 46 public and 17 private schools.

== Transportation ==
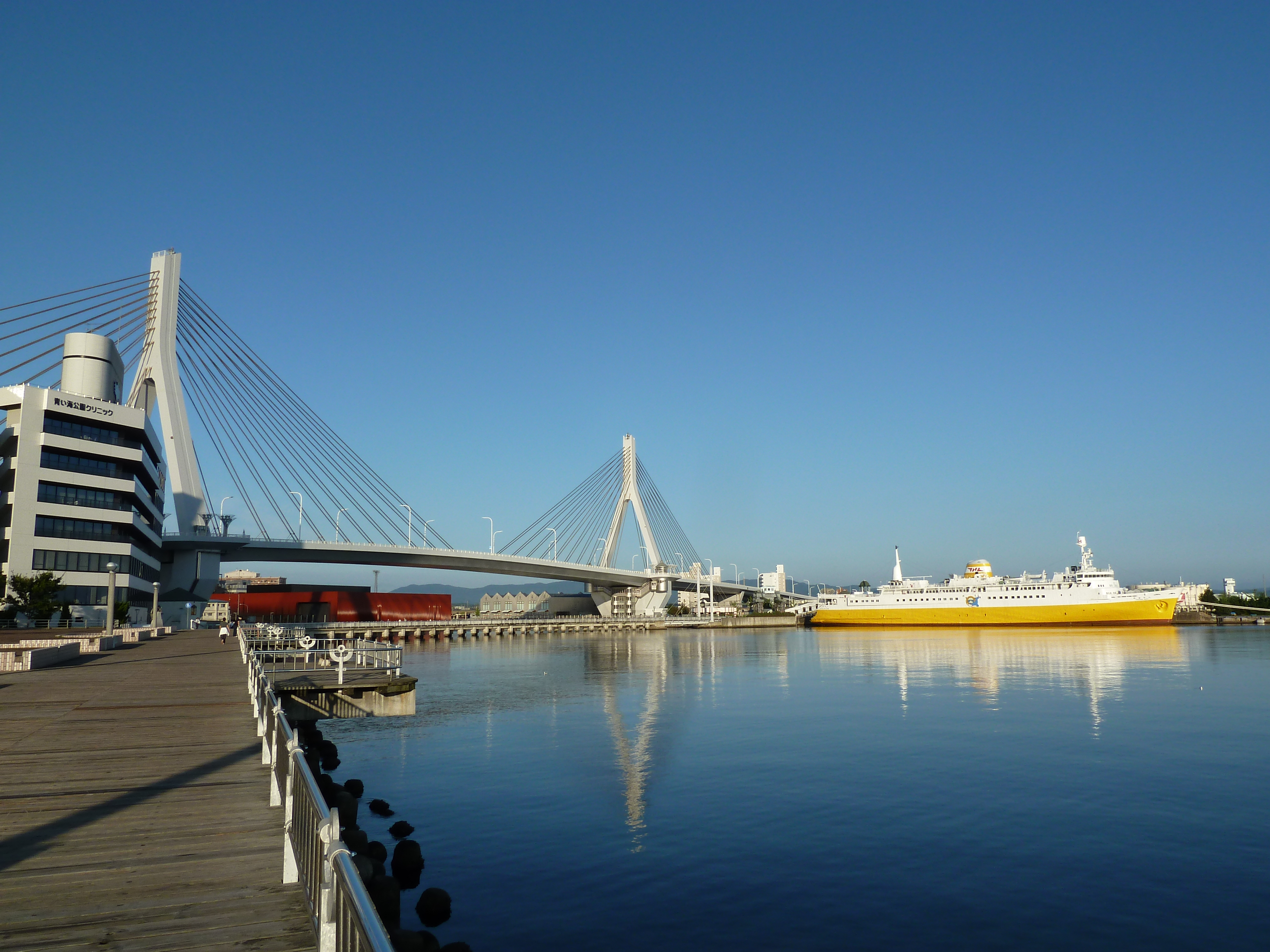
The Aomori Bay Bridge and the Memorial Ship Hakkoda-Maru seen from Aomori Bay

Aomori Prefecture has 20,818.1 km (12,935.8 mi) of roads, highways, and streets, along with 229 km (142 mi) of expressways. Four major expressways pass through the prefecture: the Tōhoku Expressway, which runs south–north through center of the prefecture; the incomplete Tsugaru Expressway, running east–west in the southwestern portion of the prefecture; the partially-complete Hachinohe-Kuji Expressway that travels south–north along the prefecture's eastern coast to Hachinohe; and the partially-complete Shimokita Expressway that travels south–north along Shimokita Peninsula from the town of Noheji to the city of Mutsu.

Several auxiliary routes of the Tōhoku Expressway also serve the prefecture. The Aomori Expressway and Hachinohe Expressway, spur routes into the eastern part of the city of Aomori and central Hachinohe. A spur of the Hachinohe Expressway continues northwest across the eastern side of the prefecture towards the prefecture's capital. It is made up of several named routes: the Momoishi Toll Road, the Daini-Michinoku Toll Road, the Kamikita Expressway, and the Michinoku Toll Road. Several national highways pass through the prefecture. National routes 4, 7, and 45 are primary routes that link the prefectural capital to the capitals of other prefectures across Japan. Additional national routes in Aomori Prefecture include routes 101, 102, 103, 104, 279, 280, 282, 338, 339, 340, 394, and 454. Two of the prefecture's national highways also continue north across the Tsugaru Strait to Hokkaido: National Route 279, which is carried to Hakodate by the Tsugaru Kaikyō Ferry; and National Route 280, which was previously carried by ferry to the town of Fukushima, Hokkaido, though the route is still signed from Fukushima to Hakodate.

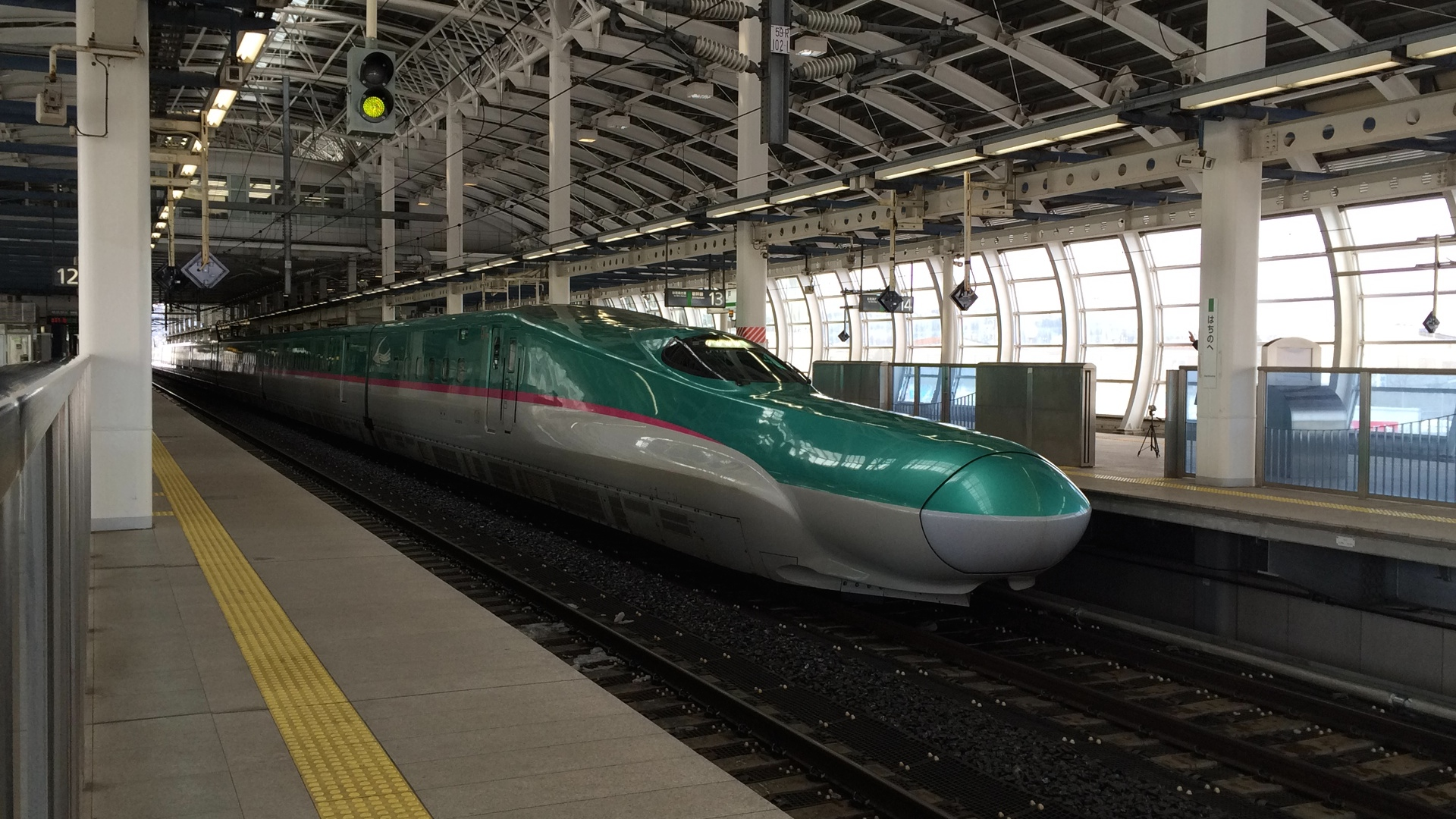
The E5 Series Shinkansen at Hachinohe Station on the high-speed Tōhoku Shinkansen line

Railways have played an important role in Aomori Prefecture's transportation network and development since the Meiji period. Aomori Station, Shin-Aomori Station, Hachinohe Station, Hirosaki Station, and Shichinohe-Towada Station are major rail stations operating in Aomori Prefecture. The East Japan Railway Company (JR East), operates several rail lines in the prefecture: the Tōhoku Shinkansen, the Tōhoku Main Line, the Ōu Main Line, the Ōminato Line, the Gonō Line, the Hachinohe Line, and the Tsugaru Line. Other notable rail operators in the prefecture are the Hokkaido Railway Company (JR Hokkaido), that runs the Hokkaido Shinkansen through the Seikan Tunnel to and from Hokkaido, the Aoimori Railway that operates passenger services on the Tōhoku Main Line, and the northernmost privately owned railway in Japan, the Tsugaru Railway.

Maritime transport in Aomori Prefecture operates primarily from the ports of Aomori City, Mutsuogawara, and Hachinohe, though smaller ports are found throughout the prefecture. The ports at Aomori City and Hachinohe both serve cruise ships and ferry lines. Additionally, a ferry line operates between Ōma and Hakodate. Prior to the opening of the Seikan Tunnel, rail ferries operated by the Japanese National Railways linked Aomori Station and Hakodate Station as the primary connection between Hokkaido and the rest of Japan. A museum dedicated to the historic rail ferries operates near Aomori Station in a former rail ferryboat, the Hakkoda Maru. In April 1995, Aomori Airport began offering a regular international air service.

There are two commercial airports located within Aomori Prefecture, Aomori Airport and Misawa Airport. Both airports are relatively small, though Aomori Airport offers regular international flights to South Korea and Taiwan, in addition to domestic flights to several cities. Combined the prefecture's two commercial airports moved 1.56 million passengers in 2024, with Aomori Airport handling 1.23 million of them.

== Symbols and names ==
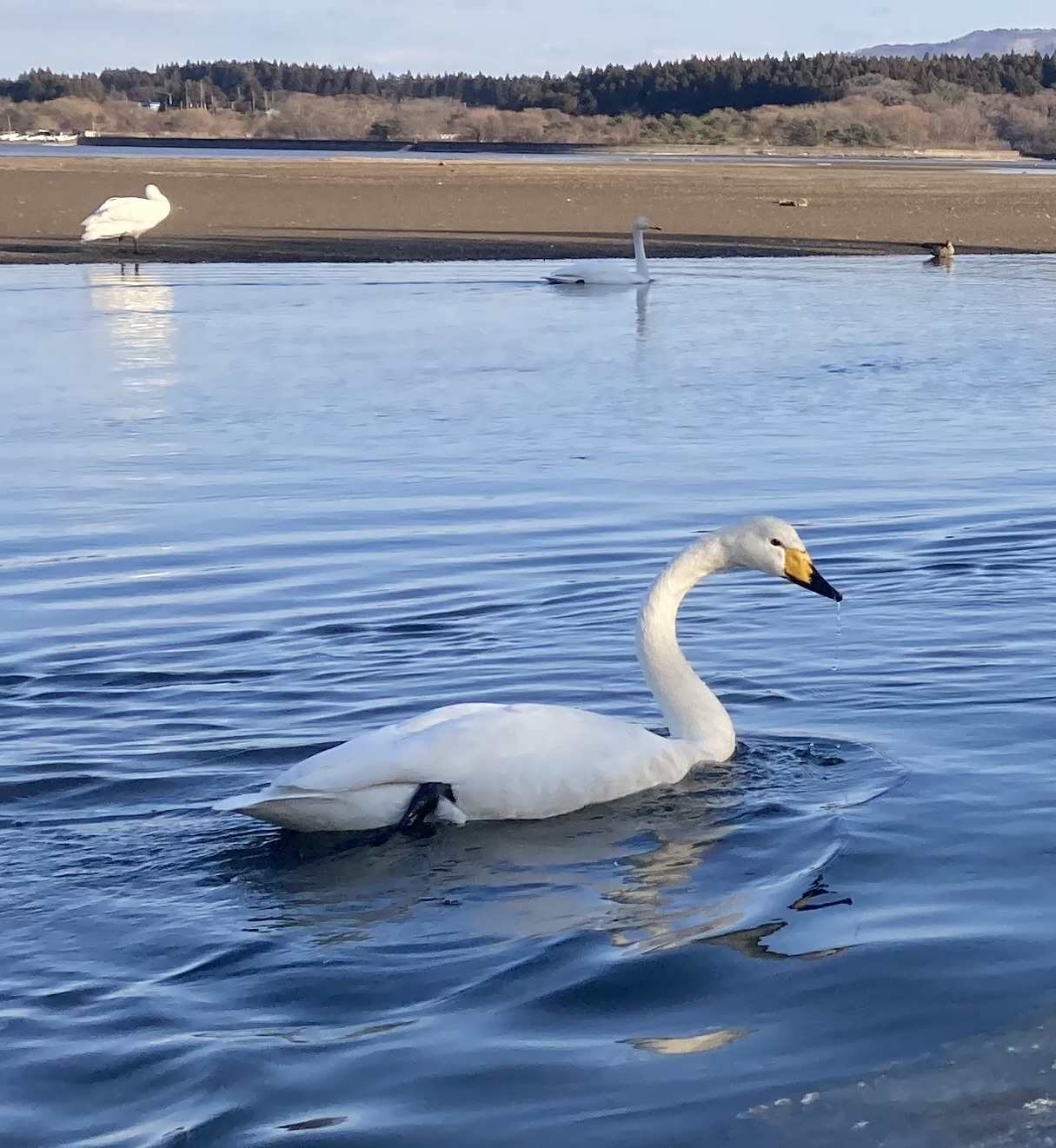
The Bewick's swan (Cygnus bewickii), seen here at Asadokoro, is the symbolic bird of Aomori Prefecture.

During the Lowell Observatory Near-Earth-Object Search conducted in Flagstaff, Arizona for main-belt asteroids that have a risk of coming close to Earth, observers discovered 19701 Aomori, an asteroid which they named after Aomori Prefecture. 19701 Aomori was given its name on May 9, 2012 after the 2011 Tōhoku earthquake and tsunami to pay respect towards the damaged communities along the prefecture's southeastern coast.

=== Prefectural symbols ===
Since 1961, the prefectural symbol of Aomori is a green stylized map of the prefecture on a white background, showing the crown of Honshū: the Tsugaru, Natsudomari and Shimokita Peninsulas. The green is representative of development while the white symbolizes the vastness of the world.

The prefectural bird has been Bewick's swan since 1964, the species migrates to the area during the winter. In 1966, the prefecture designated the hiba (Thujopsis dolabrata) as its prefectural tree. The apple blossom was designated as the prefectural flower in 1971 to pay homage to the prefecture's apple production. In 1987, the Japanese halibut was designated as the prefectural fish.

== Dialects ==
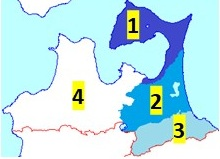
Approximate Nanbu dialect divisions in Aomori Prefecture, with the Shimokita dialect (1-dark blue), Kamikita dialect (2-medium blue), Sanpachi dialect (3-light blue), and other dialects (4-white)

Tōhoku dialect, one of the three main dialects of Japan, is spoken in Aomori Prefecture. The most widespread variants are the Tsugaru dialect, Nanbu dialect, and Shimokita dialect. The boundary determining which of these dialects are spoken is mainly along the former border of the Tsugaru and Nanbu clans between Hiranai and Noheji, with some overlap. Speakers of the Tsugaru dialect are typically centered around Hirosaki, while those who use the Nanbu dialect are centered around Hachinohe. The Shimokita dialect is used on the Shimokita Peninsula around Mutsu and has been recognized as having enough differences to distinguish it from the Nanbu dialect. It was also used in combination with the Nanbu dialect in an early Japanese–Russian dictionary written by a man whose father came from the Shimokita Peninsula. The Ainu people, culture, and language still influence Aomori Prefecture, including several Ainu words that are still in use, place names in particular.

The oldest discovered compilation of words and phrases of the Nanbu dialect was written in 1790 followed by a dictionary of the Tsugaru dialect in 1809. Special features of the Aomori Prefecture dialects include an atypical intonation, voicing consonants that are typically unvoiced (e.g. [k] sounds become [g]), and the addition of voiced velar nasal sounds and corresponding kana (か゚ [ŋa], き゚ [ŋi], く゚ [ŋu], け゚ [ŋe], and こ゚ [ŋo]).

There is a negative connotation associated with the Tōhoku dialect, associated with rurality and laziness. In shogunate times, government officials visiting the prefecture considered the Nanbu dialect very hard to understand. People from the entire Tōhoku region were often considered unsophisticated, simple, and rural and their accent was often the object of jokes. The name for the defunct Mutsu Province uses the same kanji symbol, 陸奥, as the Japanese phrase for 'land far from the capital' or 'end of the road' (陸奥, michinoku). The inhabitants were called lit. shrimp barbarians (蝦夷, ezo) and lit. citizens of the outer world (化外の民, kagainotami). Due to these negative perceptions, speakers of Tōhoku dialects will often hide their accents. A study performed in 2016 indicated that people from Aomori Prefecture who are 70 years and older frequently use these dialects, while use becomes less frequent the younger a person is, regardless of fluency. Additionally, the study revealed that when traveling to Tokyo, older generations will continue to use their dialect, while younger generations switch to standard Japanese. Over half of each generation surveyed preferred to use their local dialect when talking to Tokyoites in Aomori Prefecture. Dialectal forms are more common in the Tsugaru region of Aomori Prefecture and forms a significant part of the cultural identity of the local population. Southern Tōhoku reveals a transition from standard language to dialects of Aomori Prefecture.

== Media ==
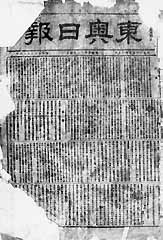
First issue of The Tō-Ō Nippō Press, December 6, 1888

The largest newspaper by readership in Aomori Prefecture is The Tō-Ō Nippō Press with a daily readership of 205,000, 55 percent of the total share of the newspaper market in the region. The newspaper also runs a radio news station which is broadcast by the Aomori Broadcasting Corporation (RAB). Other local newspapers are Hachinohe's The Daily Tōhoku Shimbun, Hirosaki's Mutsu Shimpō, and Kuroishi's Tsugaru Shinpō.

Four television stations are broadcast in Aomori Prefecture. RAB is a television and radio broadcaster based in the capital that is affiliated with the Japan Radio Network, National Radio Network, and Nippon News Network. RAB uses the call signs JOGR-DTV for digital television broadcasts and JOGE, JOGO, and JOGR for radio broadcasts in Hirosaki, Hachinohe, and Aomori City, respectively. Japan News Network's affiliate, Aomori Television began broadcasting with the call sign JOAI on 1 December 1969. Asahi Broadcasting Aomori. NHK broadcasts radio, television, and digital television from NHK Aomori with the call signs JOTC and JOTG. NHK radio services began on April 17, 1941, while television broadcasts commenced on March 22, 1959.

Hani Motoko, a native of Hachinohe, is considered to be Japan's first female journalist. She became known for her column about famous Japanese women that began publication in 1897 in the Hōchi Shimbun. Motoko later started a journal, that focused on the values of middle-class women.
