= Kanagi, Aomori =

Kanagi 金木町
- Former municipality
- Flag Emblem

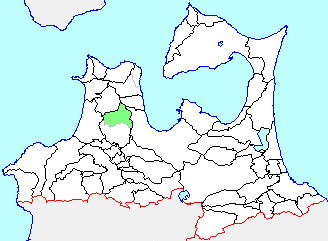
- Location of Kanagi in Aomori Prefecture

- Location in Japan
- Coordinates: 40°54′9.4″N 140°27′43.3″E
- Country: Japan
- Region: Tōhoku
- Prefecture: Aomori Prefecture
- District: Kitatsugaru
- Merged: March 28, 2005 (now part of Goshogawara)

Area
  - Total: 125.97 km^{2} (48.64 sq mi)

Population (March 1, 2005)
  - Total: 10,557
  - Density: 83.8/km^{2} (217/sq mi)
- Time zone: UTC+09:00 (JST)
- Symbols
- Bird: Skylark
- Flower: Sakura
- Tree: Hiba

Kanagi (金木町, Kanagi-machi) was a town located in Kitatsugaru District in western Aomori Prefecture, Japan.

== History ==
The town was also known as the birthplace of famed author Osamu Dazai. The area was part of Hirosaki Domain during the Edo period. After the Meiji Restoration, the village of Kanagi was created in 1898. It was raised to town status in 1920. In 1955, it annexed the neighboring villages of Kase and Kira.

On March 28, 2005, Kanagi, along with the neighboring village of Shiura (also from Kitatsugaru District), was merged into the expanded city of Goshogawara, and thus no longer exists as an independent municipality.

At the time of its merger, Kanagi had an estimated population of 10,557 and a population density of 83.8 persons per km^{2}. The total area was 125.97 km^{2}.

The town economy was dominated by commercial fishing and agriculture.

== Geography ==
Kanagi was located in the center of the Tsugaru Peninsula, in an area known for severe winter weather conditions and blizzards. The Iwaki River ran through the town.

=== Neighboring municipalities ===
These were the neighboring municipalities of Kanagi just before its incorporation into Goshogawara.

- Aomori
- Goshogawara
- Tsugaru
- Nakasato – now part of Nakadomari
- Yomogita

== Transportation ==
=== Railway ===
- Tsugaru Railway
  - Kase - Kanagi - Ashino-Kōen - Kawakura

=== Highway ===
- National Route 339

== Notable people from Kanagi ==
- Osamu Dazai - author
- Yoshi Ikuzō - enka singer-songwriter
- Takerufuji Mikiya - sumo wrestler
