= Kawakura Station =

Railway station in Goshogawara, Aomori Prefecture, Japan

Kawakura Station 川倉駅
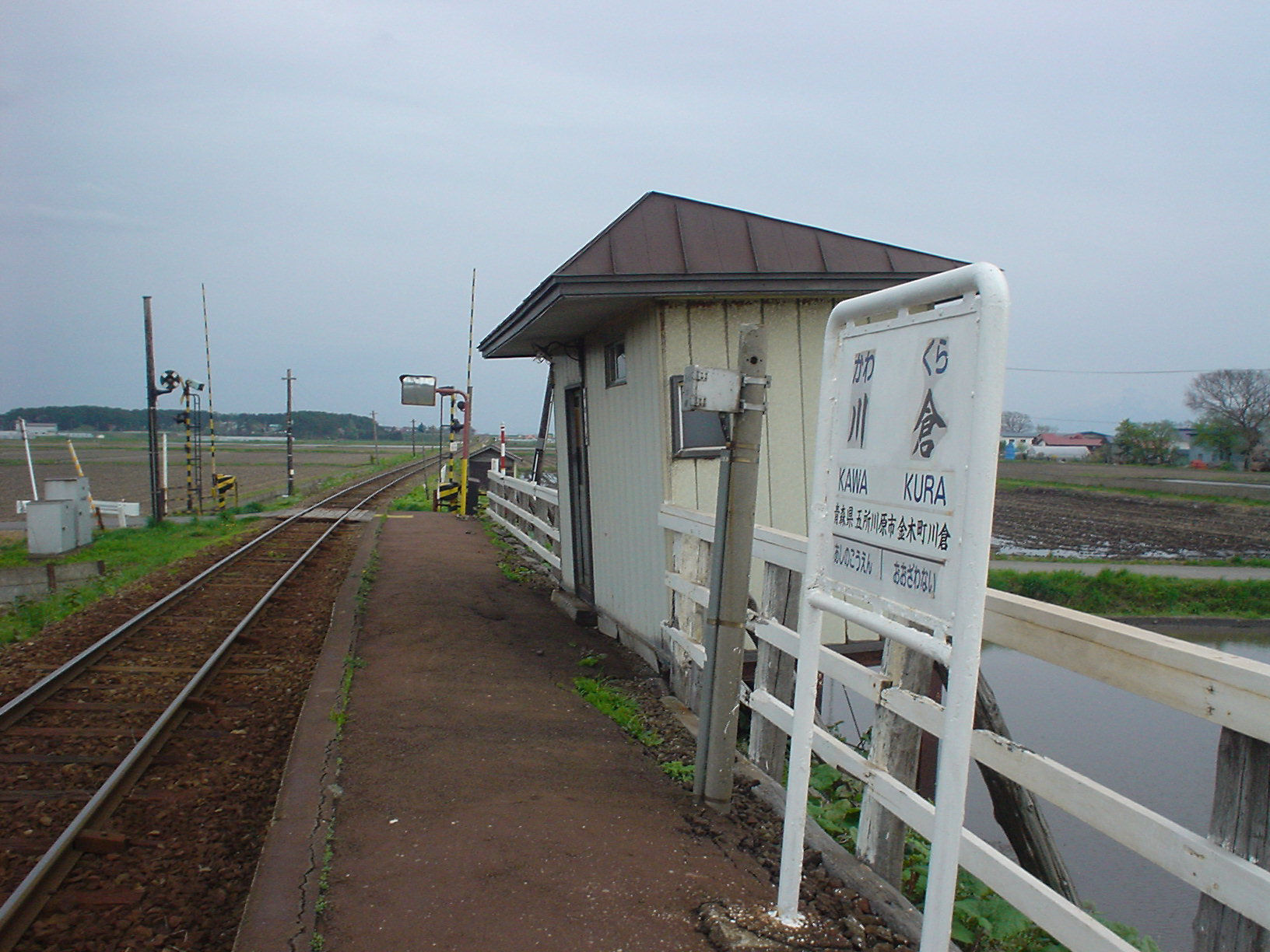
- Kawakura Station in May 2006

General information
- Location: 17-7 Kanagi Kawakura Hayashishita, Nakadomari-machi, Kitatsugaru-gun, Aomori-ken 037-0201; Japan
- Coordinates: 40°55′34.26″N 140°26′37.45″E
- Operator: Tsugaru Railway Company
- Line: ■ Tsugaru Railway Line
- Distance: 16.0 km from Goshogawara
- Platforms: 1 (1 side platform)
- Tracks: 1

Other information
- Status: Unstaffed
- Website: Official website

History
- Opened: April 24, 1932
- Closed: 1943-1955

Services
Preceding station	Tsutetsu	Following station
Ashino-Kōen towards Tsugaru Goshogawara	Tsugaru Railway Line Local	Ōzawanai towards Tsugaru-Nakasato
Location
- Location within Aomori Prefecture Location within Japan

Kawakura Station (川倉駅, Kawakura-eki) is a railway station on the Tsugaru Railway Line in the town of Nakadomari, Aomori, Japan, operated by the private railway operator Tsugaru Railway Company.

== Lines ==
Kawakura Station is served by the Tsugaru Railway Line, and is located 16.0 km from the terminus of the line at Goshogawara.

== Station layout ==
The station has one side platform serving a single bidirectional line. There is no station building, but only a weather shelter on the platform. The station is unattended.

== History ==
Kawakura Station was opened on April 24, 1932. The station building was reconstructed in 1967. It was closed on April 1, 1943, but reopened on May 20, 1955.

== Surrounding area ==
- National Route 339

== See also ==
- List of railway stations in Japan
