= Ashino-Kōen Station =

Railway station in Goshogawara, Aomori Prefecture, Japan

Ashino-Kōen Station 芦野公園駅
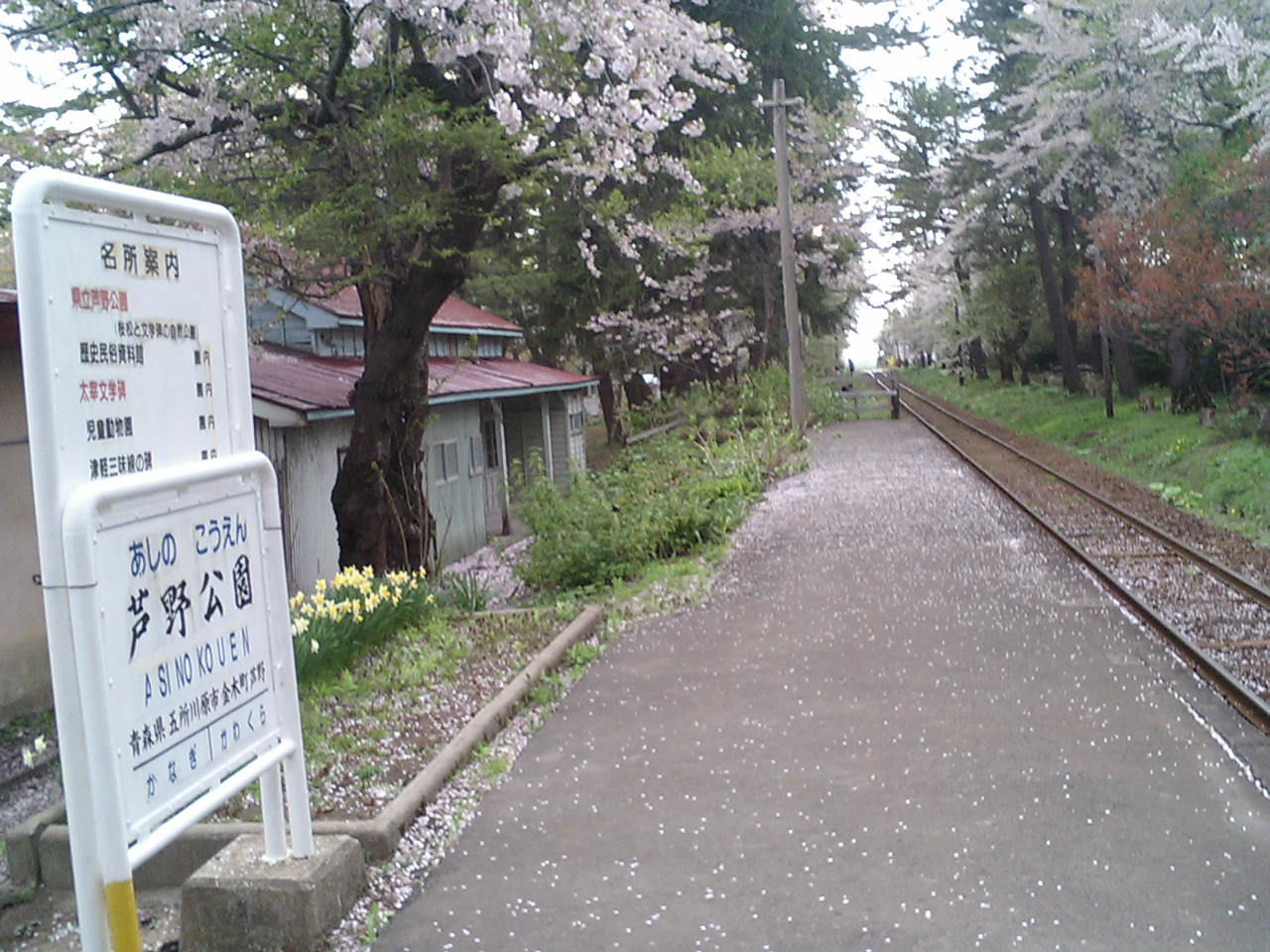
- Ashino-Kōen Station in May 2006

General information
- Location: 84-171 Kanagi-cho, Goshogawara-shi, Aomori-ken 037-0202; Japan
- Coordinates: 40°54′44″N 140°27′06″E
- Operator: Tsugaru Railway Company
- Line: ■ Tsugaru Railway Line
- Distance: 14.3 km from Tsugaru-Goshogawara
- Platforms: 1 (1 side platform)
- Tracks: 1

Other information
- Status: Unstaffed
- Website: Official website

History
- Opened: October 4, 1930

Services
Preceding station	Tsutetsu	Following station
Kanagi towards Tsugaru Goshogawara	Tsugaru Railway Line Semi-Express	Ōzawanai towards Tsugaru-Nakasato
Kanagi towards Tsugaru Goshogawara	Tsugaru Railway Line Local	Kawakura towards Tsugaru-Nakasato
Location
- Location within Aomori Prefecture Location within Japan

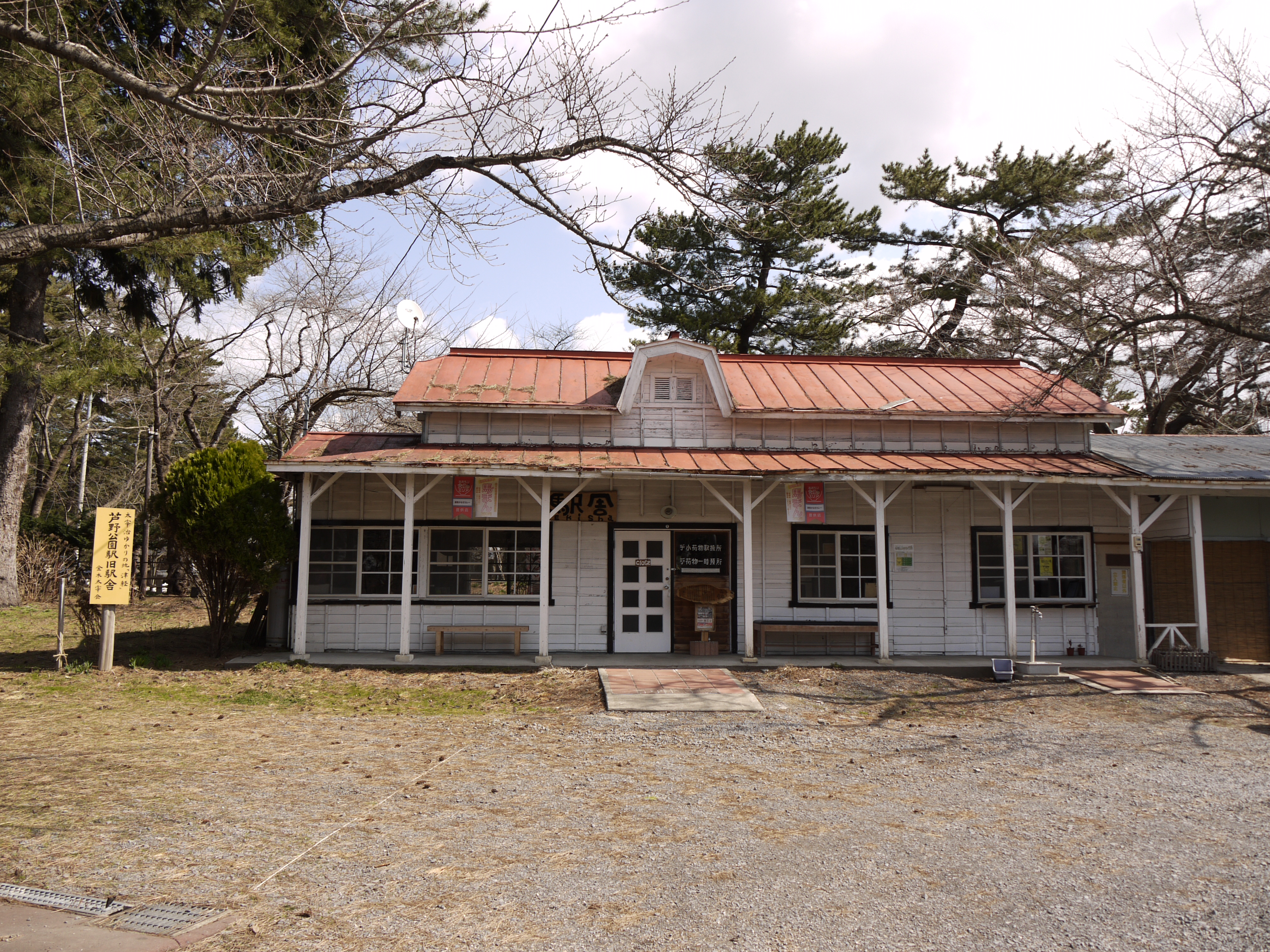
former Ashino-Kōen Station building, Registered Tangible Cultural Property

Ashino-Kōen Station (芦野公園駅, Ashino Kōen-eki) is a railway station in the city of Goshogawara, Aomori, Japan, operated by the private railway operator Tsugaru Railway Company.

== Lines ==
Ashino-Kōen Station is served by the Tsugaru Railway Line, and is located 14.3 km from the terminus of the line at Tsugaru-Goshogawara.

== Station layout ==
The station has a single ground-level side platform serving a bidirectional track. The station is unattended.

== History ==
Ashino-Kōen Station was opened on October 4, 1930. The station building was replaced in 1975. The original station building, a one-story wooden structure with a copper roof and pentagonal gable which appeared in Osamu Dazai's novel "Tsugaru", was preserved and used as a coffee shop by the NPO "Kanagi Genki Club" and as the "Tsugaru Railway Old Ashinokoen Station Bookstore". It received protection as a Registered Tangible Cultural Property in 2014. It is the last remaining building on the Tsugaru Railway from the time of its opening

== Surrounding area ==
- Ashino Chishōgun Prefectural Natural Park
- National Route 339

== See also ==
- List of railway stations in Japan
