= Gonōkōmae Station =

Railway station in Goshogawara, Aomori Prefecture, Japan

Gonōkōmae Station 五農校前駅
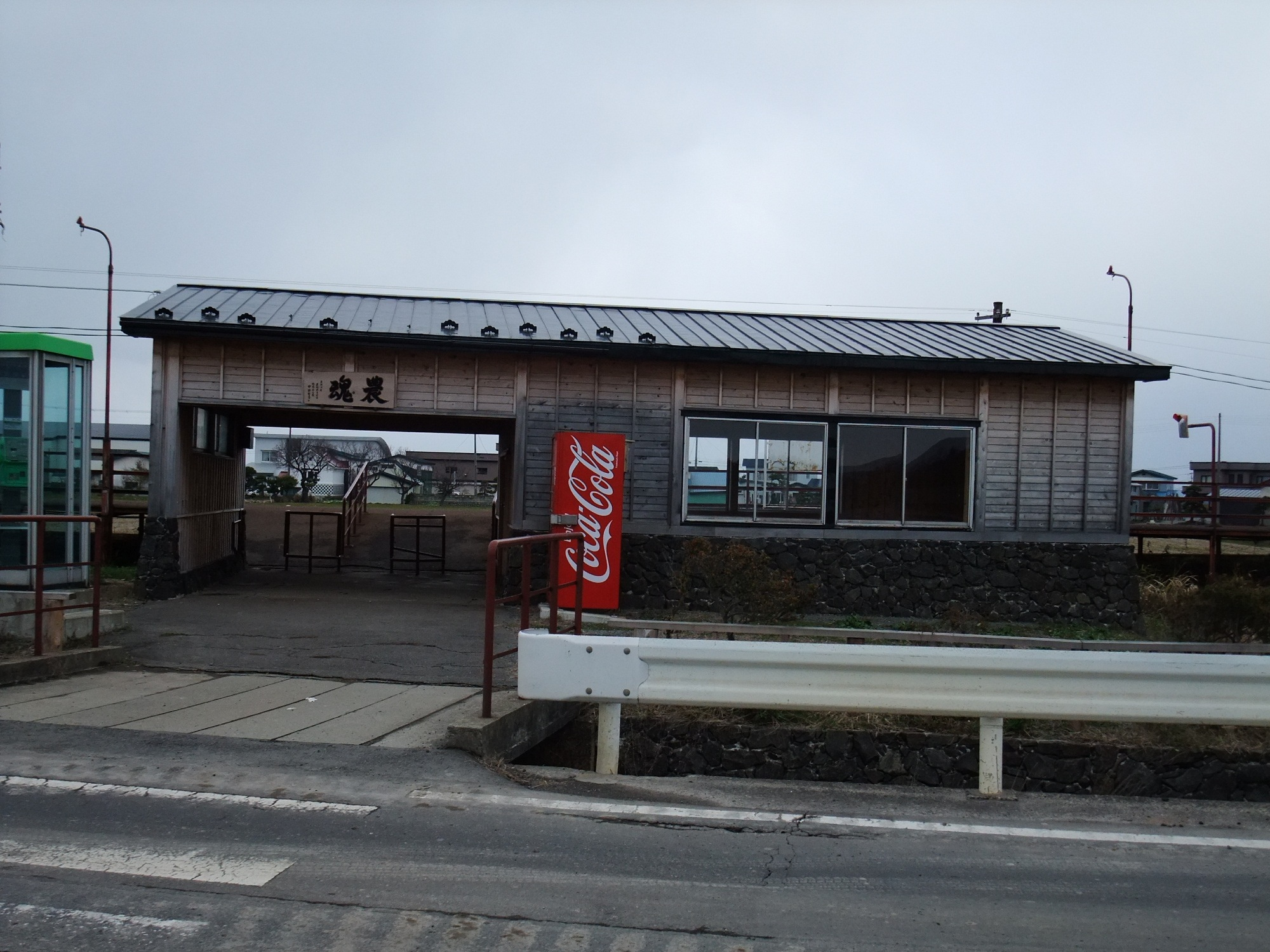
- Gonōkōmae Station in November 2012

General information
- Location: 91 Ichinotsubo Asahi Tazaki, Goshogawara-shi, Aomori-ken 037-0093; Japan
- Coordinates: 40°49′16.15″N 140°28′43.60″E
- Operator: Tsugaru Railway Company
- Line: ■ Tsugaru Railway Line
- Distance: 3.2 km from Goshogawara
- Platforms: 1 (1 side platform)
- Tracks: 1

Other information
- Status: Unstaffed
- Website: Official website

History
- Opened: April 1, 1974

Services
| Preceding station | Tsutetsu | Following station |
|---|---|---|
| Togawa towards Tsugaru Goshogawara | Tsugaru Railway Line Semi-Express; Local | Tsugaru-Iizume towards Tsugaru-Nakasato |
Location
- Location within Aomori Prefecture Location within Japan

Gonōkōmae Station (五農校前駅, Gonōkōmae-eki) is a railway station on the Tsugaru Railway Line in the city of Goshogawara, Aomori, Japan, operated by the private railway operator Tsugaru Railway Company.

== Lines ==
Gonōkōmae Station is served by the Tsugaru Railway Line, and is located 3.2 km from the terminus of the line at Goshogawara.

== Station layout ==
The station has a single side platform serving bidirectional traffic. The station is unattended.

== History ==
Gonōkōmae Station was opened on April 1, 1974.

== Surrounding area ==
- Goshogawara Agricultural High School (after which the station is named)

== See also ==
- List of railway stations in Japan
