= Bishamon Station =

Railway station in Goshogawara, Aomori Prefecture, Japan

Bishamon Station 毘沙門駅
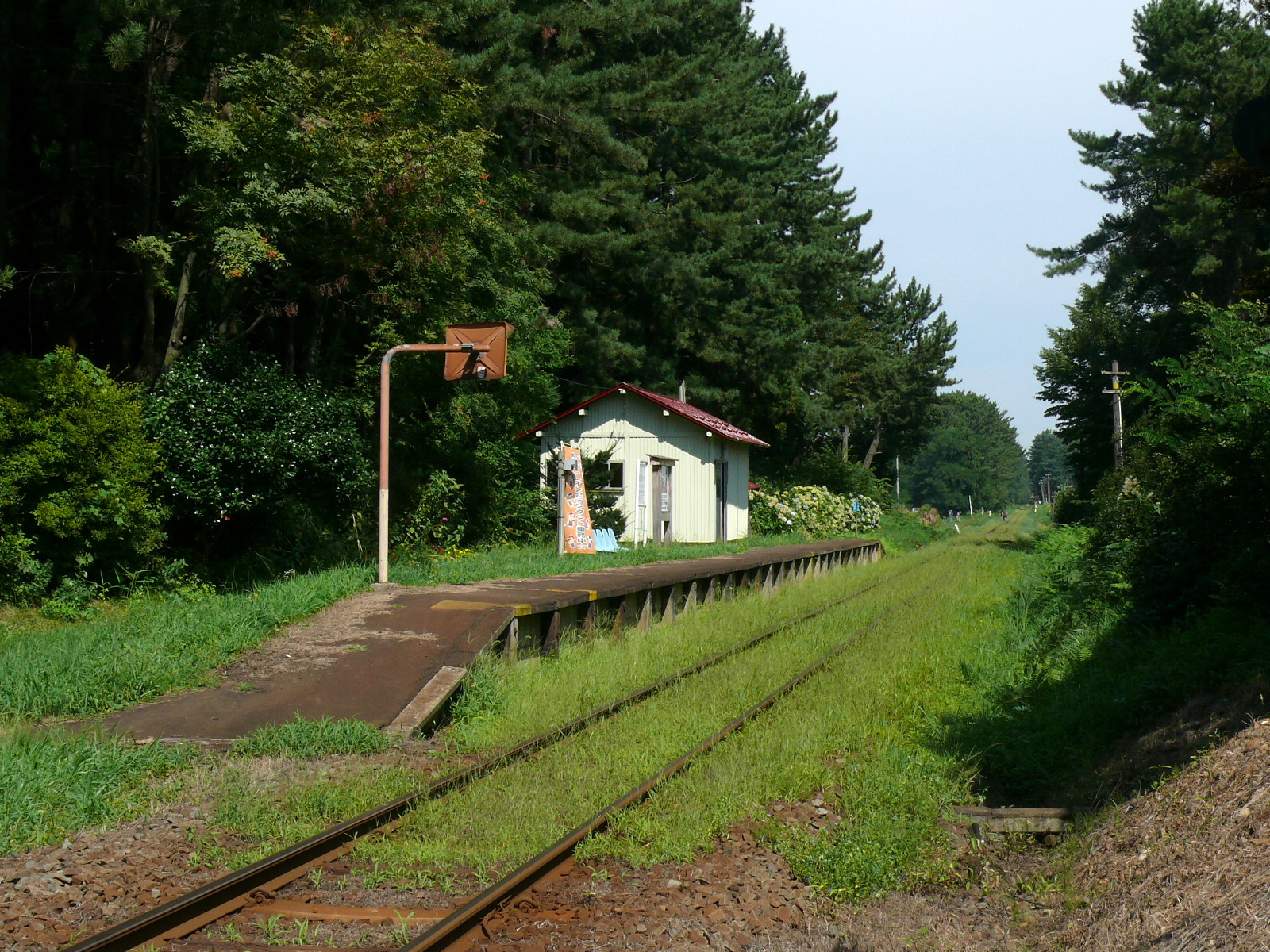
- Bishamon Station in August 2008

General information
- Location: 113-23 Bishamon Kumaishi, Goshogawara-shi, Aomori-ken 037-0096; Japan
- Coordinates: 40°51′28.48″N 140°28′39.95″E
- Operator: Tsugaru Railway Company
- Line: ■ Tsugaru Railway Line
- Distance: 7.4 km from Goshogawara
- Platforms: 1 (1 side platform)
- Tracks: 1

Other information
- Status: Unstaffed
- Website: Official website

History
- Opened: July 15, 1931
- Closed: 1941-1955

Services
Preceding station	Tsutetsu	Following station
Tsugaru-Iizume towards Tsugaru Goshogawara	Tsugaru Railway Line Local	Kase towards Tsugaru-Nakasato
Location
- Location within Aomori Prefecture Location within Japan

Bishamon Station (毘沙門駅, Bishamon-eki) is a railway station on the Tsugaru Railway Line in the city of Goshogawara, Aomori, Japan, operated by the private railway operator Tsugaru Railway Company.

== Lines ==
Bishamon Station is served by the Tsugaru Railway Line, and is located 7.4 km from the terminus of the line at Goshogawara.

== Station layout ==
The station has a single side platform serving a bidirectional track. The station is unattended.

== History ==
Bishamon Station was opened on July 15, 1931. It was closed on August 1, 1941, but was reopened on May 20, 1955.

== Surrounding area ==
The station is located in an isolated rural area.

== See also ==
- List of railway stations in Japan
