= Fukōda Station =

Railway station in Nakadomari, Aomori Prefecture, Japan

Fukōda Station 深郷田駅
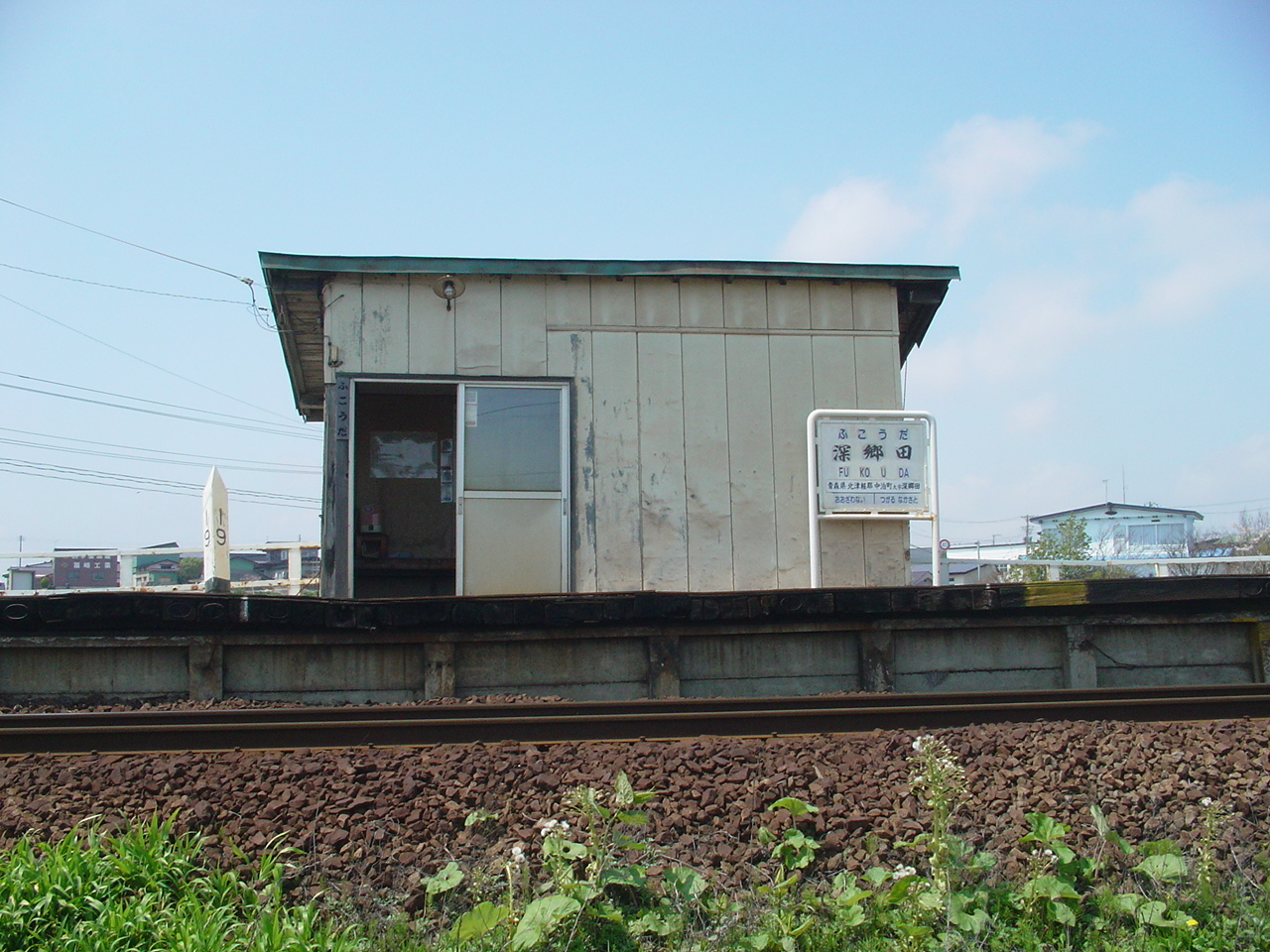
- Fukōda Station in May 2007

General information
- Location: 7-3 Amagi, Fukōda, Nakadomari-machi, Kitatsugaru-gun, Aomori-ken 037-0308; Japan
- Coordinates: 40°57′04.42″N 140°26′27.82″E
- Operator: Tsugaru Railway Company
- Line: ■ Tsugaru Railway Line
- Distance: 19.0 km from Tsugaru-Goshogawara
- Platforms: 1 (1 side platform)
- Tracks: 1

Other information
- Status: Unstaffed
- Website: Official website

History
- Opened: April 24, 1932
- Closed: 1943-1955

Services
Preceding station	Tsutetsu	Following station
Ōzawanai towards Tsugaru Goshogawara	Tsugaru Railway Line Local	Tsugaru-Nakasato Terminus
Location
- Location within Aomori Prefecture Location within Japan

Fukōda Station (深郷田駅, Fukōda-eki) is a railway station on the Tsugaru Railway Line in the town of Nakadomari, Aomori, Japan, operated by the private railway operator Tsugaru Railway Company.

== Lines ==
Fukōda Station is served by the Tsugaru Railway Line, and is located 19.0 km from the terminus of the line at Tsugaru-Goshogawara.

== Station layout ==
The station has one side platform serving a single bidirectional line. There is no station building, but only a weather shelter on the platform. The station is unattended.

== History ==
Fukōda Station was opened on April 24, 1932. It was closed on April 1, 1943, but reopened again on May 20, 1955.

== Surrounding area ==
- National Route 339

== See also ==
- List of railway stations in Japan
