= Togawa Station =

Railway station in Goshogawara, Aomori Prefecture, Japan

Togawa Station 十川駅
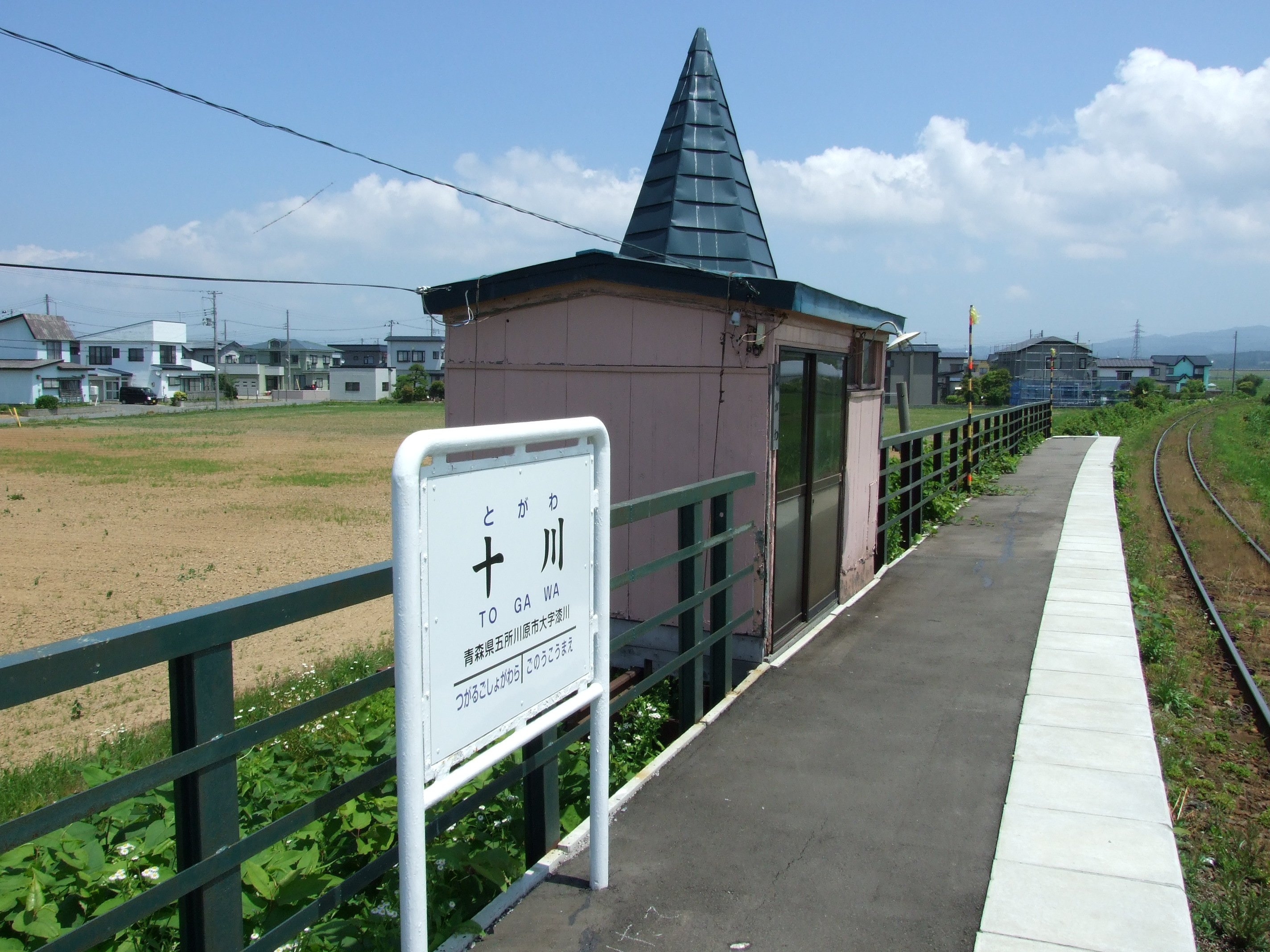
- Togawa Station in June 2015

General information
- Location: Urushigawa, Goshogawara-shi, Aomori-ken 037-0017; Japan
- Coordinates: 40°49′2.99″N 140°27′24.02″E
- Operator: Tsugaru Railway Company
- Line: ■ Tsugaru Railway Line
- Distance: 1.3 km from Goshogawara
- Platforms: 1 (1 side platform)
- Tracks: 1

Other information
- Status: Unstaffed
- Website: Official website

History
- Opened: April 25, 1961

Services
Preceding station	Tsutetsu	Following station
Tsugaru Goshogawara Terminus	Tsugaru Railway Line Semi-Express; Local	Gonōkōmae towards Tsugaru-Nakasato
Location
- Location within Aomori Prefecture Location within Japan

Togawa Station (十川駅, Togawa-eki) is a railway station on the Tsugaru Railway Line in the city of Goshogawara, Aomori, Japan, operated by the private railway operator Tsugaru Railway Company.

== Lines ==
Togawa Station is served by the Tsugaru Railway Line, and is located 1.3 km from the terminus of the line at Goshogawara.

== Station layout ==
The station has a single side platform serving bidirectional traffic. The station is unattended.

== History ==
Togawa Station opened on April 25, 1961.

== Surrounding area ==
- Fuji Electric Tsugaru Semiconductor Plant

== See also ==
- List of railway stations in Japan
