= Tsugaru-Iizume Station =

Railway station in Goshogawara, Aomori Prefecture, Japan

Tsugaru-Iizume Station 津軽飯詰駅
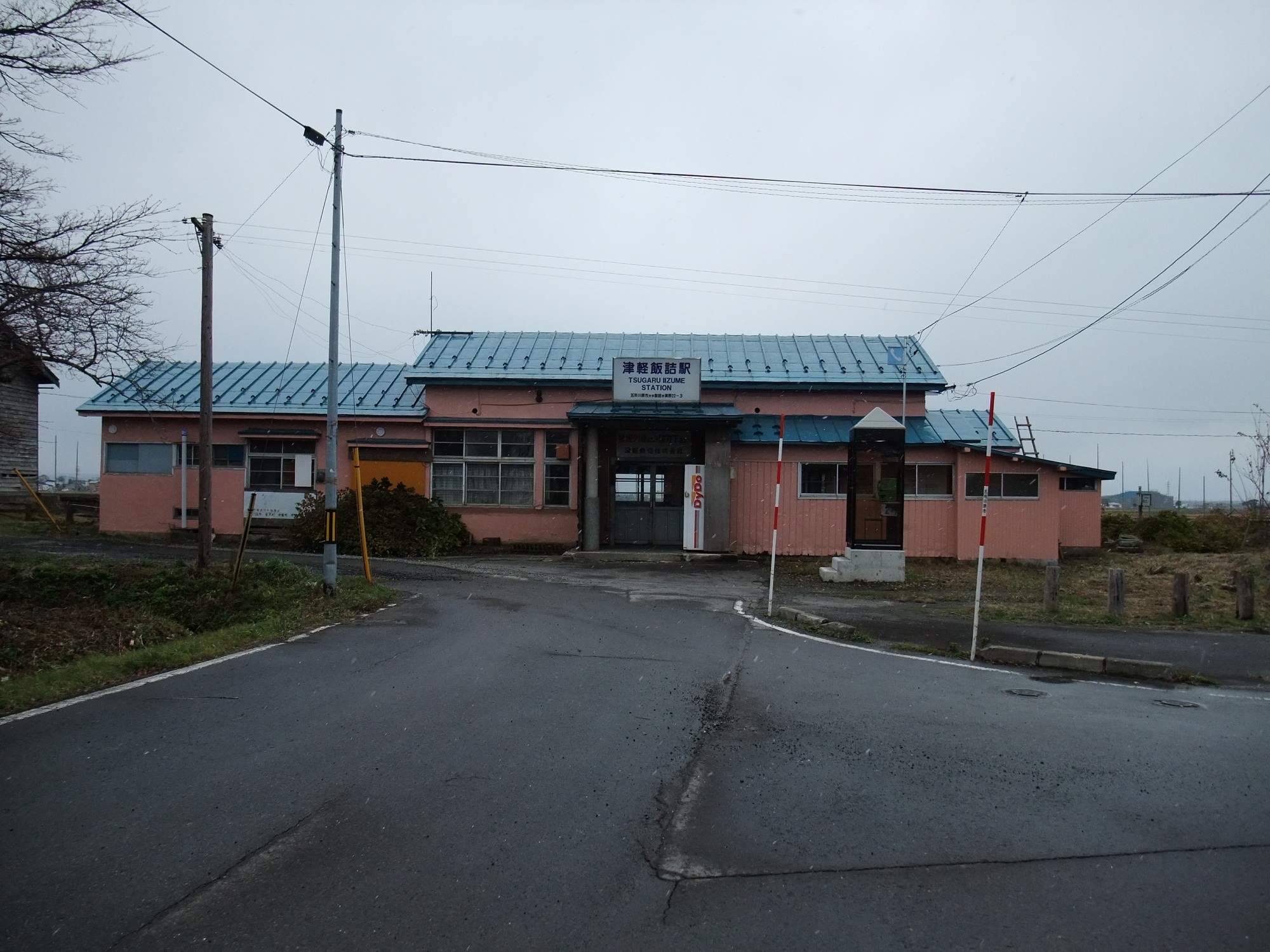
- Tsugaru-Iizume Station in November 2012

General information
- Location: 22-3 Iizume Seino, Goshogawara-shi, Aomori-ken 037-0002; Japan
- Coordinates: 40°49′47.58″N 140°28′46.51″E
- Operator: Tsugaru Railway Company
- Line: ■ Tsugaru Railway Line
- Distance: 4.2 km from Goshogawara
- Platforms: 1 (1 side platform)
- Tracks: 1

Other information
- Status: Unstaffed
- Website: Official website

History
- Opened: July 15, 1930

Services
Preceding station	Tsutetsu	Following station
Gonōkōmae towards Tsugaru Goshogawara	Tsugaru Railway Line Semi-Express	Kase towards Tsugaru-Nakasato
Gonōkōmae towards Tsugaru Goshogawara	Tsugaru Railway Line Local	Bishamon towards Tsugaru-Nakasato
Location
- Location within Aomori Prefecture Location within Japan

Tsugaru-Iizume Station (津軽飯詰駅, Tsugaru Iizume-eki) is a railway station on the Tsugaru Railway Line in the city of Goshogawara, Aomori, Japan, operated by the private railway operator Tsugaru Railway Company.

== Lines ==
Tsugaru-Iizume Station is served by the Tsugaru Railway Line, and is located 4.2 km from the terminus of the line at Goshogawara.

== Station layout ==
The station has a single side platform serving a bidirectional track. The station is unattended.

== History ==
Tsugaru-Iizume Station was opened on July 15, 1930. It has been unattended since 2004.

== Surrounding area ==
- Iizume Post Office
- Goshogawara No.4 Junior High School

== See also ==
- List of railway stations in Japan
