= Kase Station (Aomori) =

Railway station in Goshogawara, Aomori Prefecture, Japan

Kase Station 嘉瀬駅
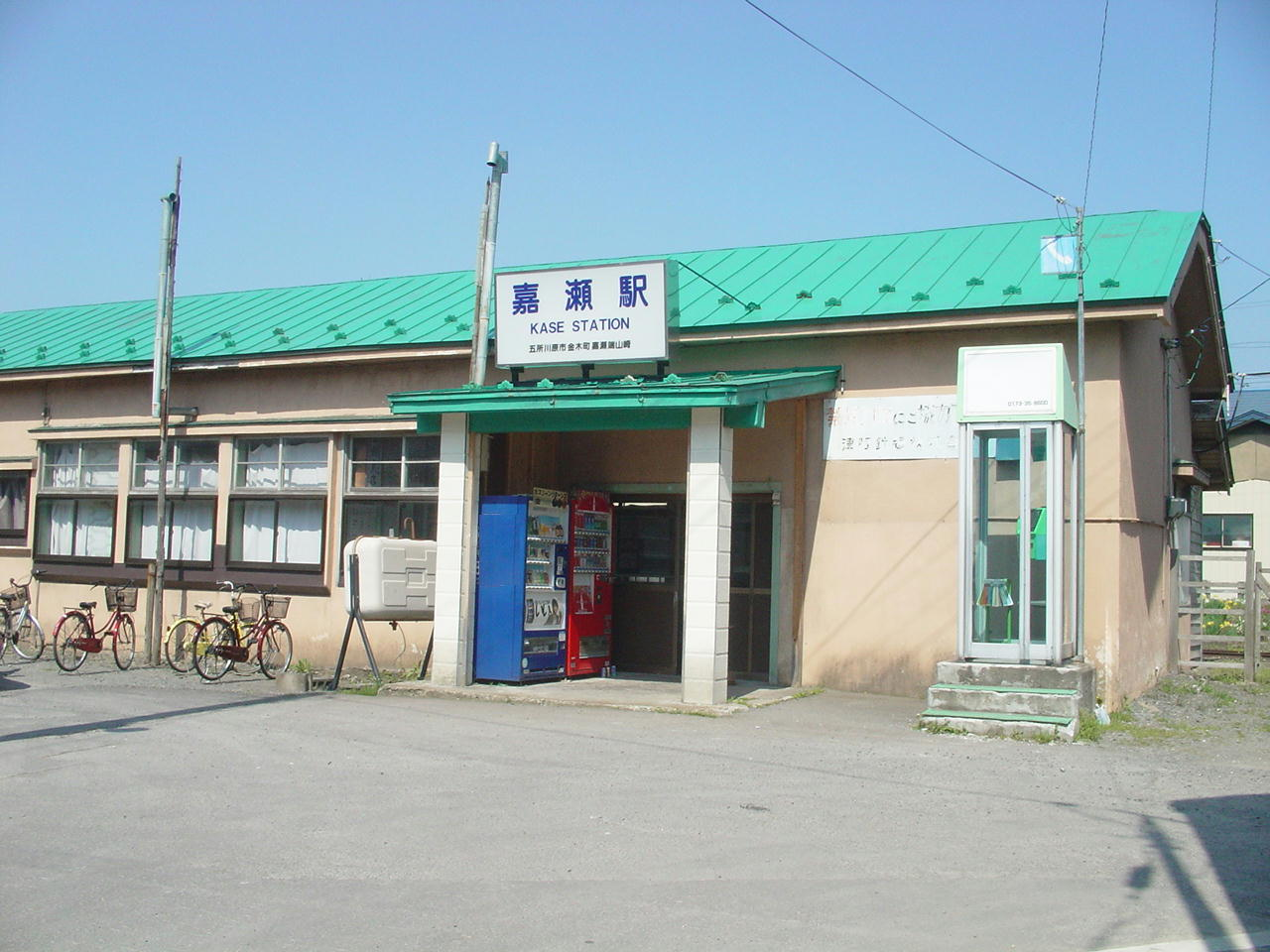
- Kase Station in May 2005

General information
- Location: 269-3 Kanagi Kase Fuchiyamazaki, Goshogawara-shi, Aomori-ken 037-0204; Japan
- Coordinates: 40°52′51.43″N 140°28′09.71″E
- Operator: Tsugaru Railway Company
- Line: ■ Tsugaru Railway Line
- Distance: 10.1 km from Goshogawara
- Platforms: 1 (1 side platform)
- Tracks: 1

Other information
- Status: Unstaffed
- Website: Official website

History
- Opened: July 15, 1930

Services
Preceding station	Tsutetsu	Following station
Tsugaru-Iizume towards Tsugaru Goshogawara	Tsugaru Railway Line Semi-Express	Kanagi towards Tsugaru-Nakasato
Bishamon towards Tsugaru Goshogawara	Tsugaru Railway Line Local	Kanagi towards Tsugaru-Nakasato
Location
- Location within Aomori Prefecture Location within Japan

Kase Station (嘉瀬駅, Kase-eki) is a railway station on the Tsugaru Railway Line in the city of Goshogawara, Aomori, Japan, operated by the private railway operator Tsugaru Railway Company.

== Lines ==
Kase Station is served by the Tsugaru Railway Line, and is located 10.1 km from the terminus of the line at Goshogawara.

== Station layout ==
The station has a single ground-level side platform serving a bidirectional track. The station is unattended.

== History ==
Kase Station was opened on July 15, 1930. It has been unattended since the 2004.

== Surrounding area ==
- Kase Post Office
- National Route 339

== See also ==
- List of railway stations in Japan
