= Ōzawanai Station =

Railway station in Nakadomari, Aomori Prefecture, Japan

Ōzawanai Station 大沢内駅
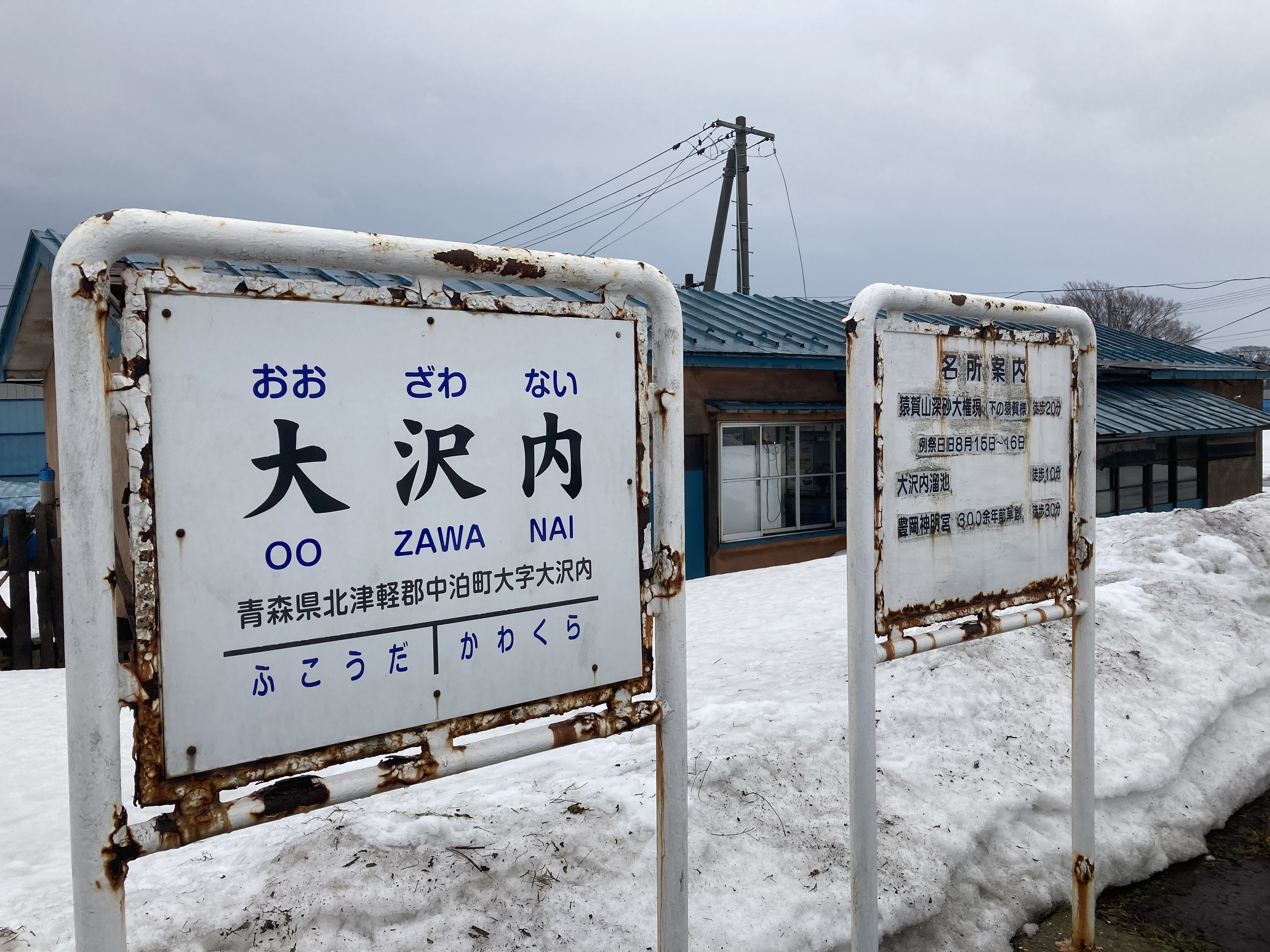
- Ōzawanai Station in February 2021

General information
- Location: 48-2 Umihara, Ōzawanai, Nakadomari-machi, Kitatsugaru-gun, Aomori-ken 037-0311; Japan
- Coordinates: 40°56′24.66″N 140°26′14.60″E
- Operator: Tsugaru Railway Company
- Line: ■ Tsugaru Railway Line
- Distance: 17.7 km from Goshogawara
- Platforms: 1 (1 side platform)
- Tracks: 1

Other information
- Status: Unstaffed
- Website: Official website

History
- Opened: October 4, 1930
- Rebuilt: 1967

Services
Preceding station	Tsutetsu	Following station
Ashino-Kōen towards Tsugaru Goshogawara	Tsugaru Railway Line Semi-Express	Tsugaru-Nakasato Terminus
Kawakura towards Tsugaru Goshogawara	Tsugaru Railway Line Local	Fukōda towards Tsugaru-Nakasato
Location
- Location within Aomori Prefecture Location within Japan

Ōzawanai Station (大沢内駅, Ōzawanai-eki) is a railway station on the Tsugaru Railway Line in the town of Nakadomari, Aomori, Japan, operated by the private railway operator Tsugaru Railway Company.

== Lines ==
Ōzawanai Station is served by the Tsugaru Railway Line, and is located 17.7 km from the terminus of the line at Goshogawara.

== Station layout ==
The station has one ground-level side platform serving a single bidirectional line. The station is unattended.

== History ==
Ōzawanai Station was opened on October 4, 1930. The station building was reconstructed in 1967.

== Surrounding area ==
- Ōzawanai Reservoir

== See also ==
- List of railway stations in Japan
