= Japan National Route 339 =

National highway in Japan

National Route 339
- 国道339号
- Japan National Route 339 highlighted in red

Route information
- Length: 108.4 km (67.4 mi)
- Existed: 1 April 1975–present

Major junctions
- South end: National Route 7 in Hirosaki
- National Route 102 / National Route 394; National Route 101; Tsugaru Expressway
- North end: National Route 280 in Sotogahama

Location
- Country: Japan

Highway system
- National highways of Japan; Expressways of Japan
← National Route 338	→ National Route 340

National Route 339 (国道339号, Kokudō Sanbyaku san-jukyūgō) is a national highway of Japan that traverses the western side of Aomori Prefecture, traveling south to north. The 108.4-kilometer (67.4 mi) highway begins as a concurrent route with National Route 7 in central Hirosaki, it then leaves National Route 7 in Fujisaki and travels north through the municipalities of Itayanagi, Tsuruta, Goshogawara, and Nakadomari before ending at an intersection with National Route 280 in Sotogahama. In a unique feature, a 0.4-kilometer-long (0.25 mi) section of the route on Cape Tappi is a staircase.

== Route description ==
National Route 339 has a section of highway on Cape Tappi that is a staircase.

National Route 339 begins as a concurrent route with National Route 7 in central Hirosaki, northeast of Undōkōenmae Station. Shortly after, the highway has an interchange with National Routes 102, 394, and Aomori Route 109. After passing through the city and entering the town of Fujisaki, it leaves National Route 7 and turns northwest, paralleling the downstream path of the Iwaki River. In Itayanagi, the route curves to the north again, heading directly towards central Goshogawara. After entering Goshogawara, the highway intersects National Route 101. The two highways parallel one another in central Goshogawara before diverging, Route 101 turns west and Route 339 curves northeast. North of the central district of Goshogawara, the highway connects to the Tsugaru Expressway, a limited-access bypass of the city, at Goshogawara-kita Interchange.

Continuing north, the highway begins its journey across to the Tsugaru Peninsula to Cape Tappi at its northern tip. In the former town of Kanagi, the highway draws closer to the parallel Tsugaru Railway. They parallel one another, crossing out of Goshogawara, until they reach central Nakadomari, where the railway terminates while the highway continues north out of the town. Upon leaving Nakadomari the first time, the highway re-enters Goshogawara and curves northwest along the northern shore of Lake Jūsan. Eventually the route arrives at the Sea of Japan coast of the peninsula, it curves north here and eventually enters Nakadomari once again. As the highway approaches Cape Tappi, it winds its way across the western Tsugaru Mountains into the former town of Minmaya (now part of Sotogahama); due to the sharp curves and rapid changes in elevation, this section of the highway is closed during the winter when weather conditions would make the feature impassable. At Cape Tappi, a 338.2-meter-long (1,110 ft) section of the highway is a staircase made up of 362 stairs, the only one of its kind among the national highways of Japan. This section of the highway is open only to pedestrian traffic and is subject to closure in the winter. After the staircase section ends, the highway continues southeast away from the cape along the coast of the Tsugaru Strait. The route terminates at an intersection with National Route 280, just short of Sotogahama's border with Imabetsu.

== History ==
The staircase at Cape Tappi was built as a joint effort between local people and the Japan Self-Defense Forces. When the national government was looking for local roads to incorporate into the planned National Route 339, the stairs were left in place and designated as part of the proposed highway because a normal road would be too steep and narrow. National Route 339 was established by the Cabinet of Japan in 1975 along the stairway and other local roads between Hirosaki and then-extant Minamaya (now part of Sotogahama). On 18 July 2018, a 1.5-kilometer (0.93 mi) section of the highway was realigned just north of central Goshogawara as a measure to improve its level of safety and its access to the Tsugaru Expressway. This section is referred to as the Goshogawara-kita Bypass.

== Major junctions ==
The route lies entirely within Aomori Prefecture.

Location	km	mi	Destinations	Notes
Hirosaki	0.0	0.0	National Route 7 south	Southern terminus
Hirosaki	0.5	0.31	National Route 102 east / National Route 394 north – Lake Towada, Kuroishi, Tōhoku Expressway, Inakadate; Aomori Prefecture Route 109 west – Central Hirosaki, Hirosaki Castle	Interchange; western terminus of National Route 102, southern terminus of National Route 394
Hirosaki	2.1	1.3	Aomori Prefecture Route 3 west – Central Hirosaki; Akita Prefecture Route 268 east – Kuroishi	
Hirosaki	3.6	2.2	Kita-Ōdori – Central Hirosaki, Hirosaki Castle, Naijoshi	Interchange
Hirosaki	4.3	2.7	Aomori Prefecture Route 41 east – Naijoshi	Southern end of Aomori Prefecture Route 41 concurrency
Hirosaki	5.8	3.6	Aomori Prefecture Route 41 west – Ajigasawa	Northern end of Aomori Prefecture Route 41 concurrency
Hirosaki	6.4	4.0	Aomori Prefecture Route 260 south	
Fujisaki	7.0	4.3	National Route 7 north – Towada, Aomori	Northern end of National Route 7 concurrency
Fujisaki	7.7	4.8	Aomori Prefecture Route 239 east – Fujisaki Station	
Fujisaki	7.9	4.9	Aomori Prefecture Route 131 – Maesaka, Kita-Tokiwa Station	
Itayanagi	13.9	8.6	Aomori Prefecture Route 35 south – Hirosaki; Aomori Prefecture Route 125 east – Itayanagi Town Office, Itayanagi Station	Southern end of Aomori Prefecture Routes 35 and 125 concurrency
Itayanagi	14.4	8.9	Aomori Prefecture Route 35 north – Aomori, Namioka	Northern end of Aomori Prefecture Route 35 concurrency
Itayanagi	16.6	10.3	Aomori Prefecture Route 125 west – Kashiwa, Hirosaki (Otomo)	Northern end of Aomori Prefecture Route 35 concurrency
Tsuruta	20.1	12.5	Aomori Prefecture Route 200 west – Mawarizeki; Aomori Prefecture Route 240 east – Kurumidate	
Tsuruta	22.1	13.7	Aomori Prefecture Route 153 west – Morita	
Tsuruta	23.1	14.4	Aomori Prefecture Route 150 – Mutsu-Tsuruda Station	
Tsuruta	24.6	15.3	Aomori Prefecture Route 158 south	
Tsuruta	25.0	15.5	Aomori Prefecture Route 159 north – to National Route 339 Bypass, Tappi	
Goshogawara	27.4	17.0	National Route 101 – Ajigasawa, Aomori	
Goshogawara	27.9	17.3	Aomori Prefecture Route 156 – to Tsugaru Expressway, Ajigasawa	
Goshogawara	28.9	18.0	Aomori Prefecture Route 252 east – Goshogawara Station	
Goshogawara	30.0	18.6	National Route 339 south (Bypass) – Hirosaki; Former National Route 339 north – Goshosgawara (Kanagi), Osamu Dazai Memorial Museum	
Goshogawara	31.0	19.3	Tsugaru Expressway – to Tōhoku Expressway, National Route 7, Aomori, Senjōjiki, Ajigasawa	Goshogawara-kita Interchange
Goshogawara	32.0	19.9	Aomori Prefecture Route 163 – Iizume, Tsugaru (Inagaki)	
Goshogawara	34.8	21.6	Former National Route 339 south	
Goshogawara	36.2	22.5	Aomori Prefecture Route 36 south – Kase Station	
Goshogawara	39.3	24.4	Aomori Prefecture Route 2 east – Aomori	
Goshogawara	40.0	24.9	Aomori Prefecture Route 2 – Shariki, Inagaki, Kanagi Station	
Nakadomari	44.5	27.7	Aomori Prefecture Route 102 west – Ōzawanai Station	
Nakadomari	44.8	27.8	Aomori Prefecture Route 103 north – Fukōda Station	
Nakadomari	46.1	28.6	Aomori Prefecture Route 197 south – Fukuura	
Nakadomari	52.5	32.6	Aomori Prefecture Route 189 west – Shariki (Tomiyachi)	
Nakadomari	55.5	34.5	Aomori Prefecture Route 12 north – to Okutsugaru-Imabetsu Station, Imabetsu, Sotogahama	Southern end of Aomori Prefecture Route 12 concurrency
Goshogawara	66.2	41.1	Aomori Prefecture Route 12 south – Ajigasawa, Lake Jūsan	Northern end of Aomori Prefecture Route 12 concurrency
Nakadomari	74.1	46.0	Aomori Prefecture Route 111 west – Kodomari Fishing Port	Northern end of Aomori Prefecture Route 12 concurrency
Nakadomari	76.3	47.4	Aomori Prefecture Route 286 east – Kodomari Dam	Northern end of Aomori Prefecture Route 12 concurrency
Sotogahama	96.3	59.8	Aomori Prefecture Route 281 (Ajisai Road) east – Minmaya Station	Northern end of Aomori Prefecture Route 12 concurrency
Sotogahama	98.3– 98.7	61.1– 61.3	National Route 339 (Kaidan-kokudō stairs)	Only pedestrian traffic is allowed
Sotogahama	108.4	67.4	National Route 280 – Aomori, Imabetsu; Aomori Prefecture Route 230 east – Minmaya Station	Northern terminus
1.000 mi = 1.609 km; 1.000 km = 0.621 mi: Concurrency terminus; Incomplete access
