= Ashino Chishōgun Prefectural Natural Park =

Natural park of Aomori prefecture, Japan

Coordinates: 40°54′59″N 140°27′25″E

- 芦野池沼群県立自然公園
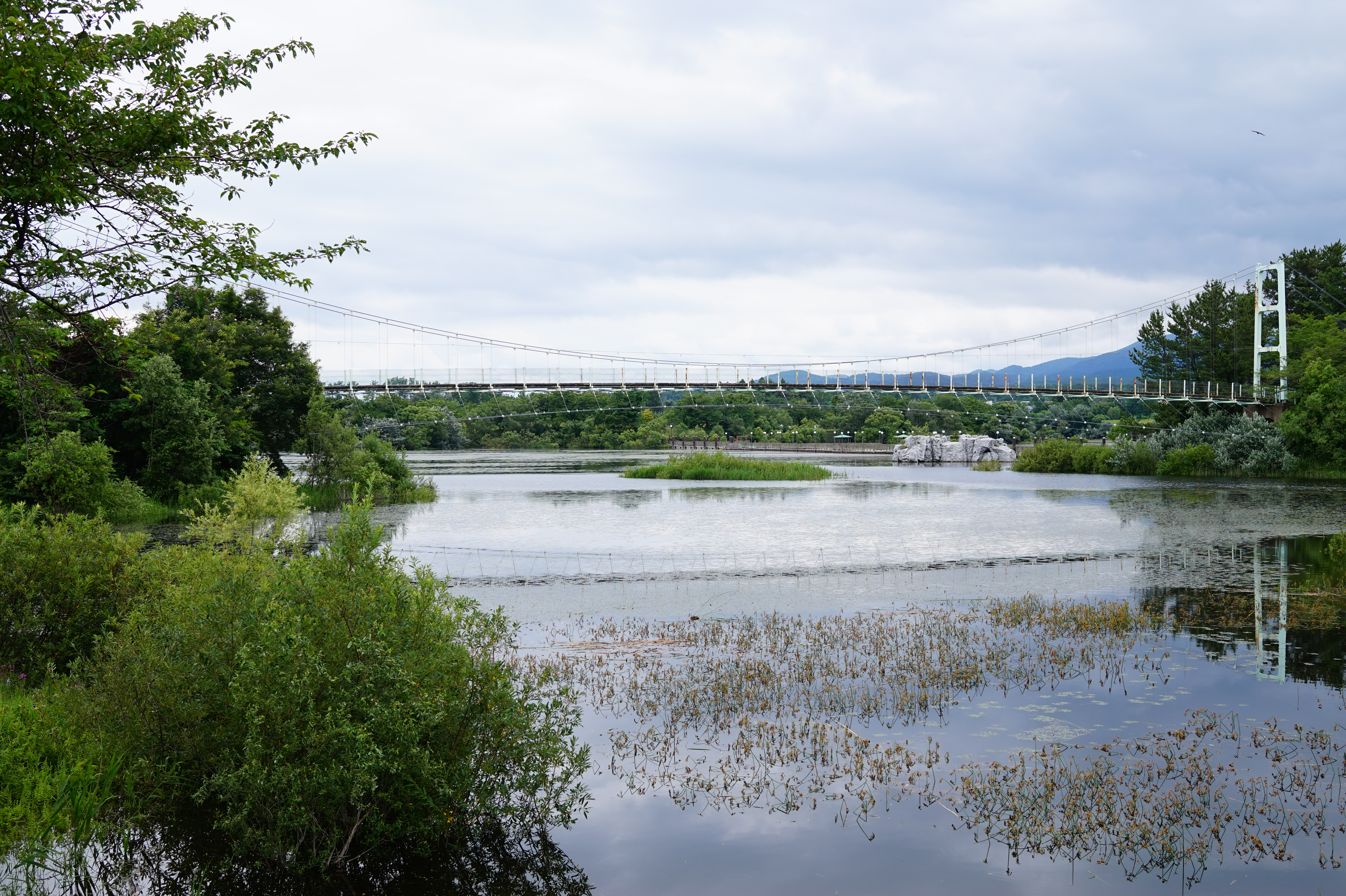
- Ashino Park in Goshogawara, Aomori.
- Interactive map of Ashino Chishōgun Prefectural Natural Park
- Location: Aomori Prefecture, Japan
- Nearest city: Goshogawara/Nakadomari
- Area: 6.12 km^{2} (2.36 sq mi)
- Established: 14 October 1958

Ashino Chishōgun Prefectural Natural Park (芦野池沼群県立自然公園, Ashino Chishōgun kenritsu shizen-kōen) is a Prefectural Natural Park on the Tsugaru Peninsula in northwest Aomori Prefecture, Japan. Established in 1958, the park spans the borders of the municipalities of Goshogawara and Nakadomari. It encompasses Lake Ashino (芦野湖) and Ashino Park, which is planted with 2,300 cherry trees.

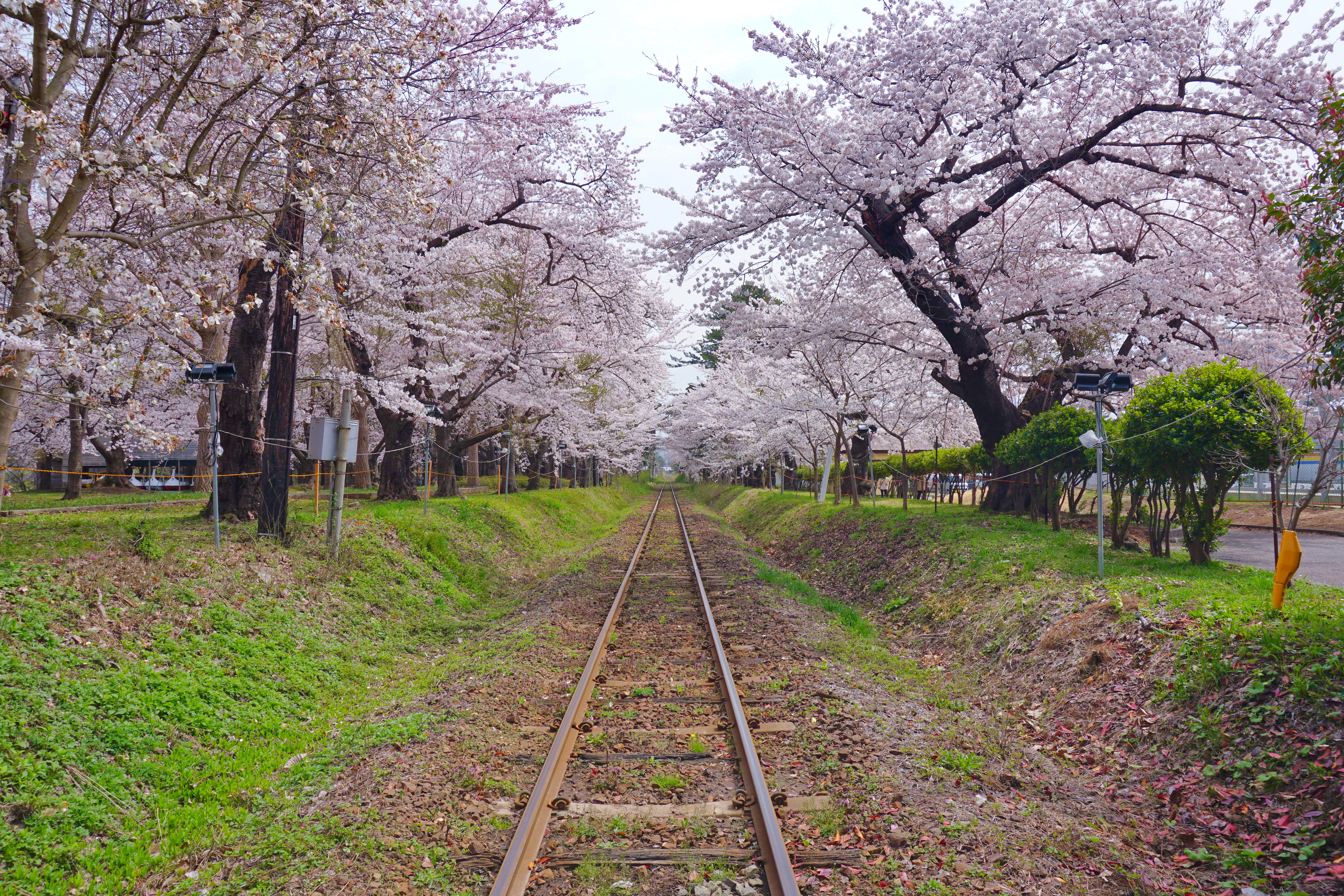

== See also ==
- National Parks of Japan
