= Kodomari Dam =

Dam on the Kodomari River in Aomori Prefecture, Japan

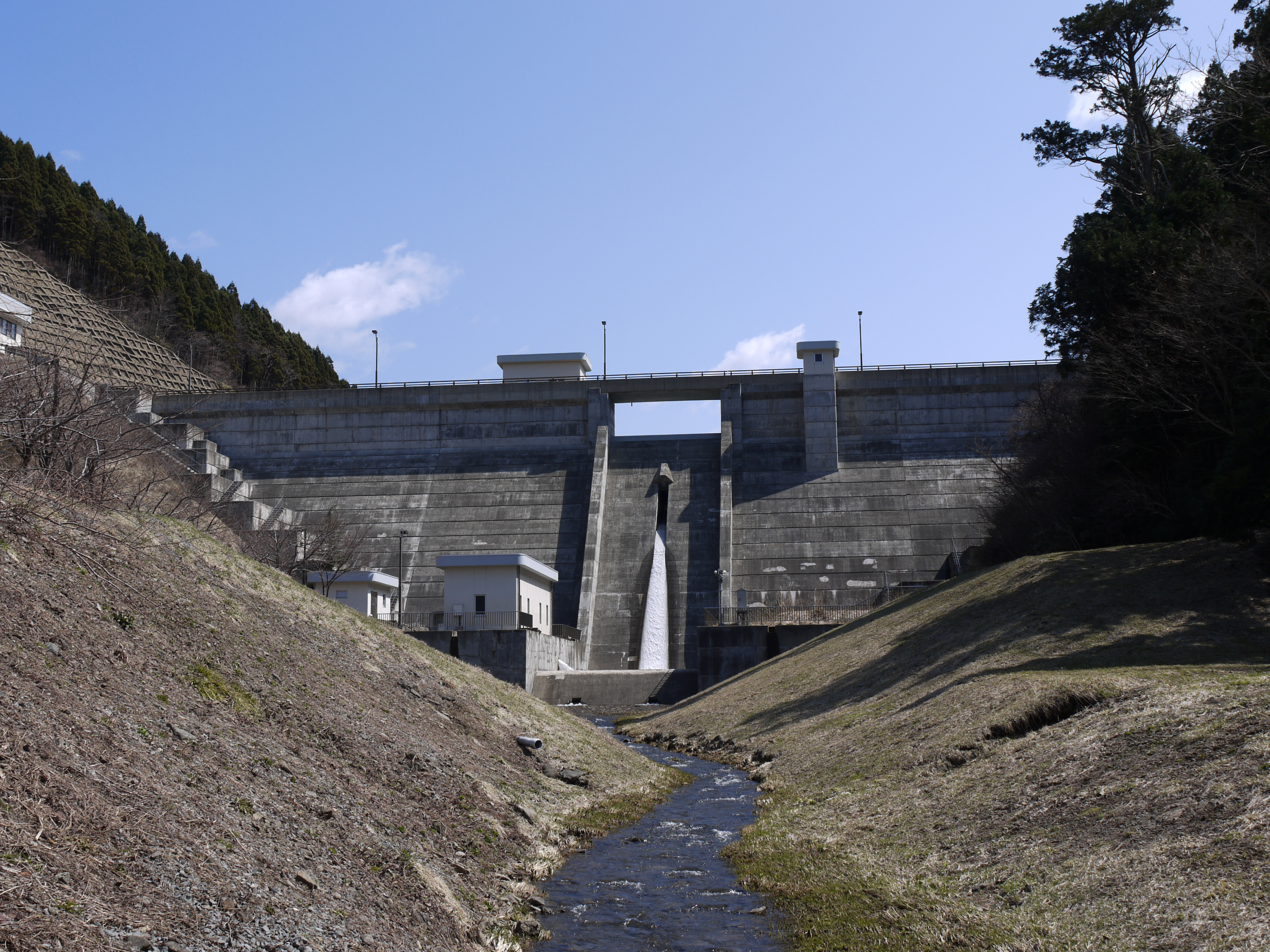
- Interactive map of Kodomari Dam
- Official name: 小泊ダム
- Country: Japan
- Location: Nakadomari, Aomori Japan
- Coordinates: 41°7′45″N 140°20′17″E
- Purpose: FNW
- Status: Operational
- Construction began: 1988
- Opening date: 1996
- Built by: Okumura Gumi
- Operator: Aomori Prefecture

Dam and spillways
- Type of dam: Gravity dam
- Impounds: Kodomari River
- Height: 33.5 meters
- Length: 121.5 meters

Reservoir
- Creates: Yusenko
- Total capacity: 400,000 m^{3}
- Active capacity: 340,000 m^{3}
- Catchment area: 2.4 km^{2}
- Surface area: 4.23 hectares

The Kodomari Dam (小泊ダム, Kodomari damu) is a dam on the Kodomari River, located in the town of Nakadomari, Kitatsugaru District, Aomori Prefecture in the Tohoku region of Japan.

The dam is a concrete gravity dam across the Kodomari River. It is multipurpose dam to provide water for irrigation, flood control and drinking water.
