= Kanagi Station =

Railway station in Goshogawara, Aomori Prefecture, Japan

Kanagi Station 金木駅
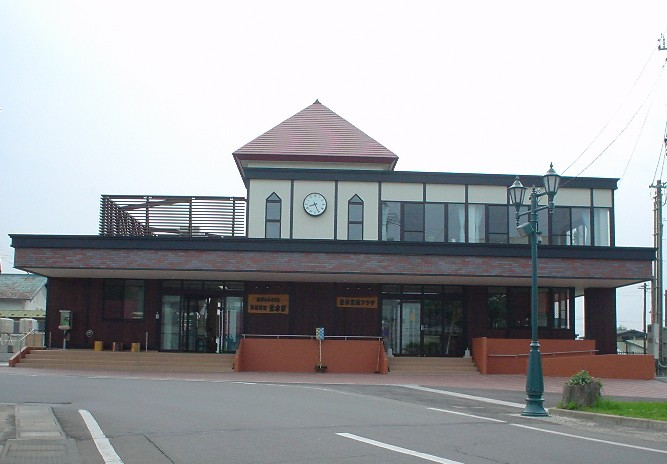
- Kanagi Station in July 2004

General information
- Location: Kanagi-cho Asahiyama 360-2, Goshogawara-shi, Aomori-ken 037-0202; Japan
- Coordinates: 40°54′11″N 140°27′36″E
- Operator: Tsugaru Railway Company
- Line: ■ Tsugaru Railway Line
- Distance: 12.8 km from Tsugaru-Goshogawara
- Platforms: 2 (2 side platforms)
- Tracks: 2

Other information
- Status: Staffed
- Website: Official website

History
- Opened: July 15, 1930
- Rebuilt: 2003

Services
Preceding station	Tsutetsu	Following station
Kase towards Tsugaru Goshogawara	Tsugaru Railway Line Semi-Express; Local	Ashino-Kōen towards Tsugaru-Nakasato
Location
- Location within Aomori Prefecture Location within Japan

Kanagi Station (金木駅, Kanagi-eki) is a railway station on the Tsugaru Railway Line in the city of Goshogawara, Aomori, Japan, operated by the private railway operator Tsugaru Railway Company.

== Lines ==
Kanagi Station is served by the Tsugaru Railway Line, and is located 12.8 km from the terminus of the line at Tsugaru-Goshogawara.

== Station layout ==
The station has dual opposed ground-level side platforms serving two tracks, connected by a level crossing. The station is staffed.

== Platforms ==
1	■ Tsugaru Railway Line	for Tsugaru-Nakasato
2	■ Tsugaru Railway Line	Tsugaru-Goshogawara

== History ==
Kanagi Station was opened on July 15, 1930 with the opening of the Tsugaru Railway Line. The station building was rebuilt on December 25, 2003.

== Surrounding area ==
- Kanagi Post Office
- Osamu Dazai Memorial Museum
- National Route 339

== See also ==
- List of railway stations in Japan
