= Tsugaru Railway =

Railway line in Aomori prefecture, Japan

Tsugaru Railway Line

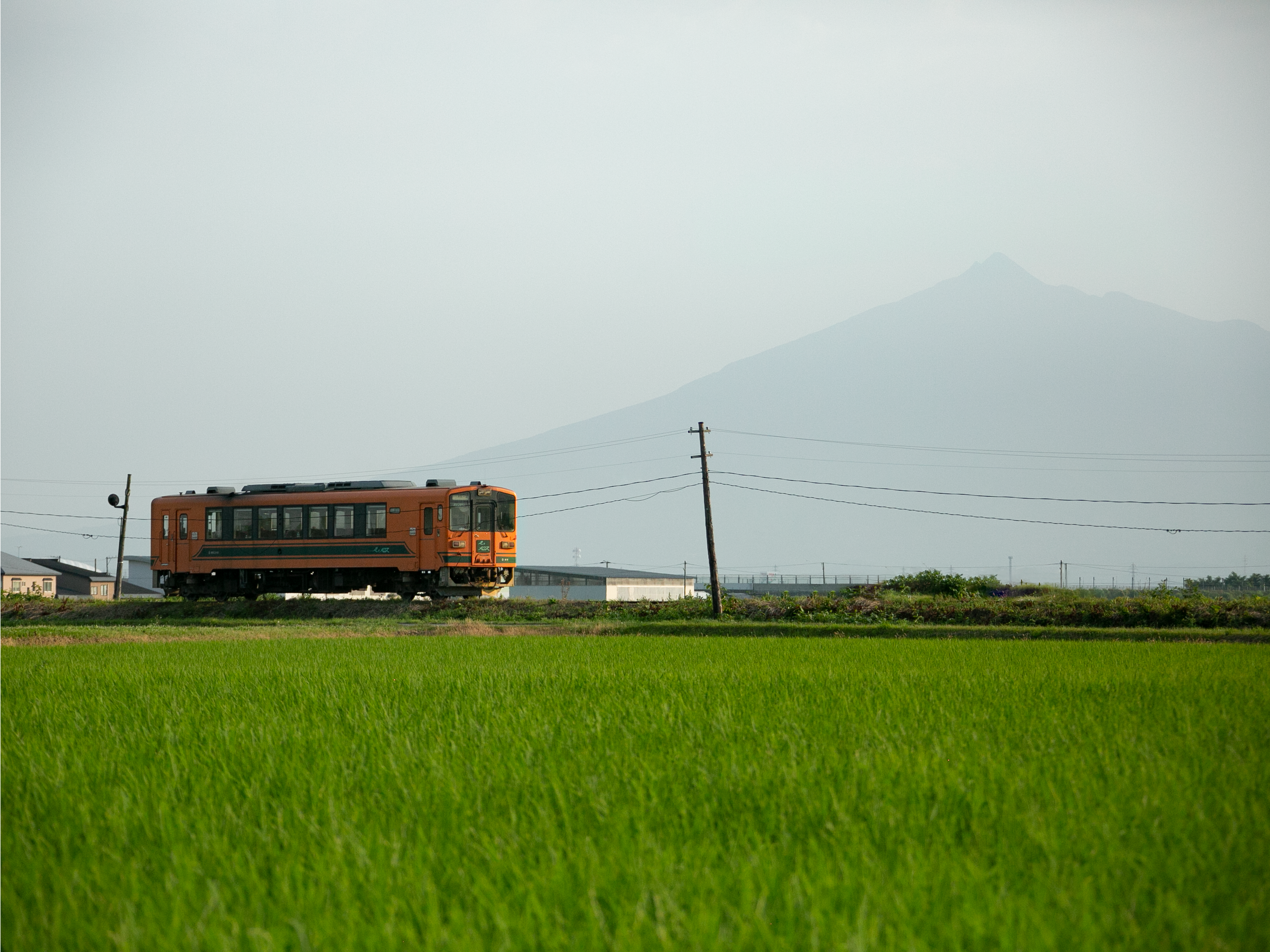
- A train on the Tsugaru Railway Line with Mount Iwaki in the background, July 2023

Overview
- Native name: 津軽鉄道線
- Status: In operation
- Owner: Tsugaru Railway Company
- Locale: Aomori Prefecture
- Termini: Goshogawara; Tsugaru-Nakasato
- Stations: 12

Service
- Type: Regional rail
- Operator: Tsugaru Railway Company

History
- Opened: 1930

Technical
- Line length: 20.7 km (12.9 mi)
- Number of tracks: Single track (entire line)
- Character: Rural
- Track gauge: 3 ft 6 in (1,067 mm)
- Electrification: None
- Operating speed: 70 km/h (44 mph)
Route map
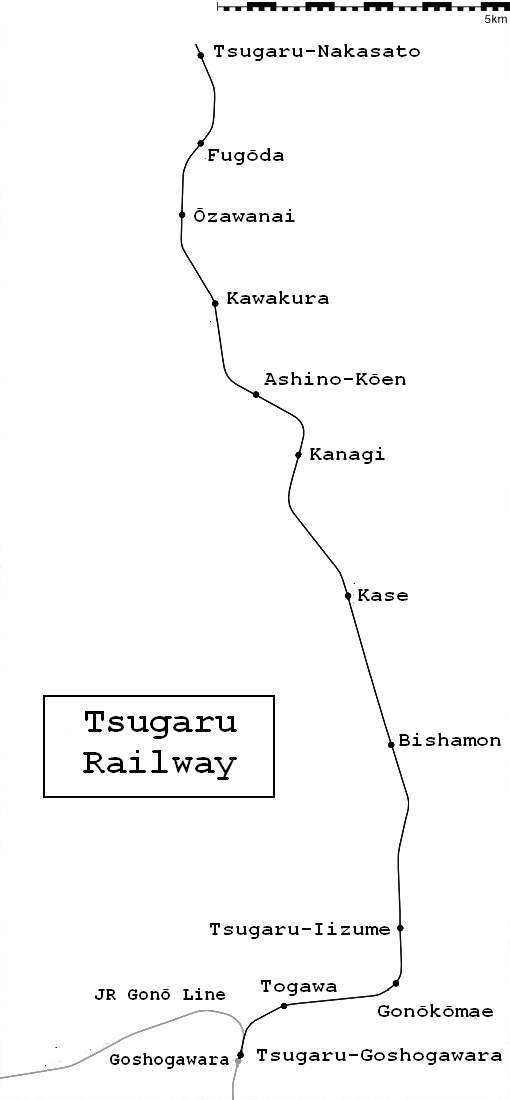

The Tsugaru Railway Line (津軽鉄道線, Tsugaru Tetsudō-sen) is a railway line in Aomori Prefecture, Japan, connecting Tsugaru-Goshogawara in the city of Goshogawara and Tsugaru-Nakasato in the town of Nakadomari, in central-southern Tsugaru Peninsula. The line is the only railway line operated by the Tsugaru Railway Company, which is locally referred to as Tsutetsu (津鉄). The Tsugaru Railway Line is notable for its seasonal trains that are run during the summer, autumn and winter. The Tsugaru Railway Line should not be confused with the former government Tsugaru Line, now operated by JR East.

== Operation ==
The Tsugaru Railway Line is single-track for its entire length, and its sole passing loop is located at Kanagi Station. Railway signaling of the line consists of two staff tokens; one token controls access between Tsugaru-Goshogawara and Kanagi, while the other token controls access between Kanagi and Tsugaru-Nakasato.

As of 1 July 2023, there are 12 round-trip trains daily that run between Tsugaru-Goshogawara and Tsugaru-Nakasato. This is down from 14 round-trip trains daily that ran before the COVID-19 pandemic. An additional 2 trains that run between Kanagi and Tsugaru-Nakasato (one of which does not run on holidays), providing a service every 60-90 minutes during the day. All train services on the line are officially classified by the company as Local services, and most trains stop at all stations; however, some trains are timetabled to skip several stations. Historically, such trains were classified separately as Semi-Express services, and are referred to as such in the station list below.

During the summer (from 1 July to 31 August), locally made wind chimes and haiku strips are hung from the ceiling of all trains in operation. These are replaced with baskets of suzumushi during the autumn (1 September to mid-October).

=== Stove train ===
During the winter (from 1 December until 31 March the following year), a 'stove train' is generally operated three times per day. (Note: During weekdays in December, 'stove trains' are operated twice per day instead.) The 'stove train' features a traditional passenger car heated using a potbelly stove. A supplementary 'stove train' ticket, which costs ¥500, is required to board the 'stove train'. 'Stove trains' follow the Semi-Express stopping pattern.

=== Station list ===
Station	Japanese	Distance (km)	Semi-Express (Note: Including 'stove trains' during winter.)	Transfers	Location	
Tsugaru-Goshogawara	津軽五所川原	0.0	●	■ Gonō Line (Goshogawara)	Goshogawara	Aomori
Togawa	十川	1.3	●		Goshogawara	Aomori
Gonōkōmae	五農校前	3.2	●		Goshogawara	Aomori
Tsugaru-Iizume	津軽飯詰	4.2	●		Goshogawara	Aomori
Bishamon	毘沙門	7.4	|		Goshogawara	Aomori
Kase	嘉瀬	10.1	●		Goshogawara	Aomori
Kanagi	金木	12.8	●		Goshogawara	Aomori
Ashino-Kōen	芦野公園	14.3	●		Goshogawara	Aomori
Kawakura	川倉	16.0	|		Goshogawara	Aomori
Ōzawanai	大沢内	17.7	●		Nakadomari	Aomori
Fukōda	深郷田	19.0	|		Nakadomari	Aomori
Tsugaru-Nakasato	津軽中里	20.7	●		Nakadomari	Aomori

== History ==
The Tsugaru Railway Company was founded in 1928, and the first section of the line was opened on July 15, 1930, from Goshogawara to Kanagi. This was extended to Ōzawanai by October 4, 1930, and to its present terminus of Tsugaru-Nakasato by November 13, 1930. All freight operations were discontinued on February 1, 1984.

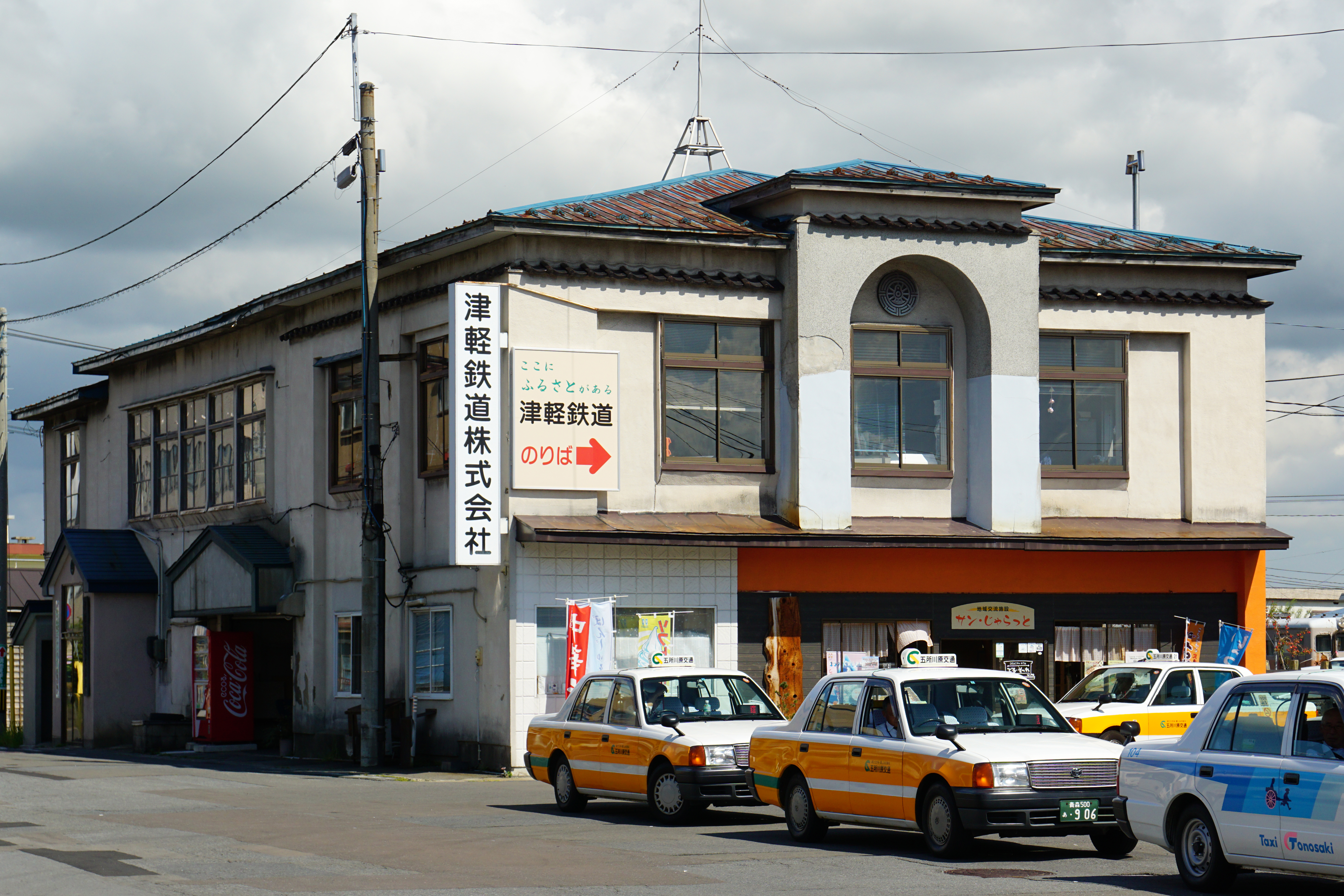
The company's head office in Goshogawara

=== Former connecting lines ===
- Kanagi station - The Tsugaru Forest Railway, utilising a Shay locomotive and consisting of a 67 km main line (including two tunnels) and four branches between 2 and 8 km in length, operated between 1906 and 1970.

== See also ==
- List of railway companies in Japan
- List of railway lines in Japan
