= Nakadomari =

Nakadomari 中泊町
- Town
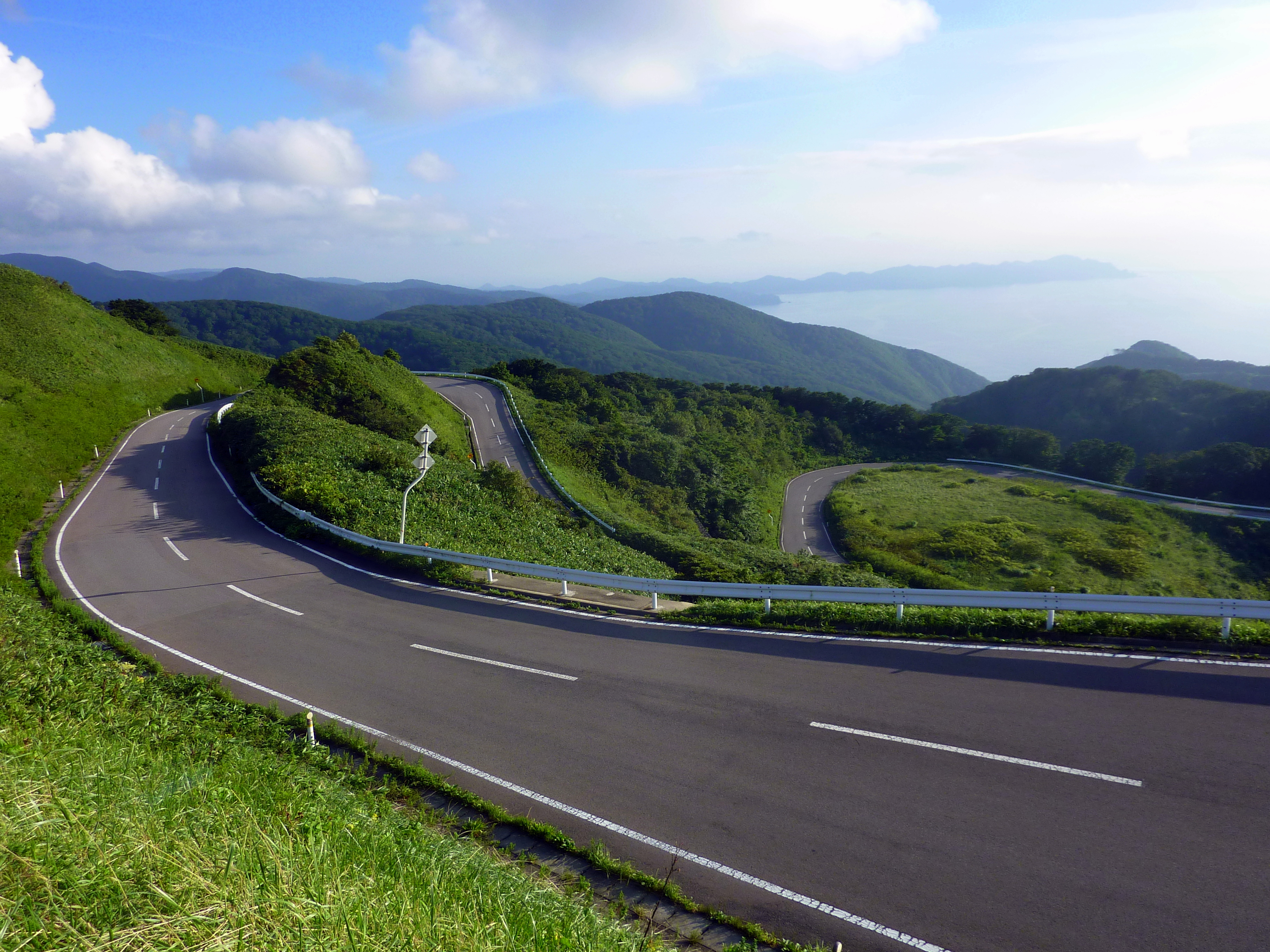
- Tatsudomari Line between Kodomari and Cape Tappi

- Flag Seal
- Location of Nakadomari in Aomori Prefecture

- Coordinates: 40°57′38″N 140°26′03″E
- Country: Japan
- Region: Tōhoku
- Prefecture: Aomori
- District: Kitatsugaru

Area
  - Total: 216.34 km^{2} (83.53 sq mi)

Population (January 31, 2023)
  - Total: 9,981
  - Density: 46.14/km^{2} (119.5/sq mi)
- Time zone: UTC+9 (Japan Standard Time)
- Phone number: 0173-57-2111
- Address: 434 Kameyama, Nakasato, Nakadomari-machi, Kitatsugraru-gun, Aomori-ken 037-0392
- Website: Official website
- Symbols
- Bird: Barn swallow
- Flower: Chrysanthemum
- Tree: Hiba

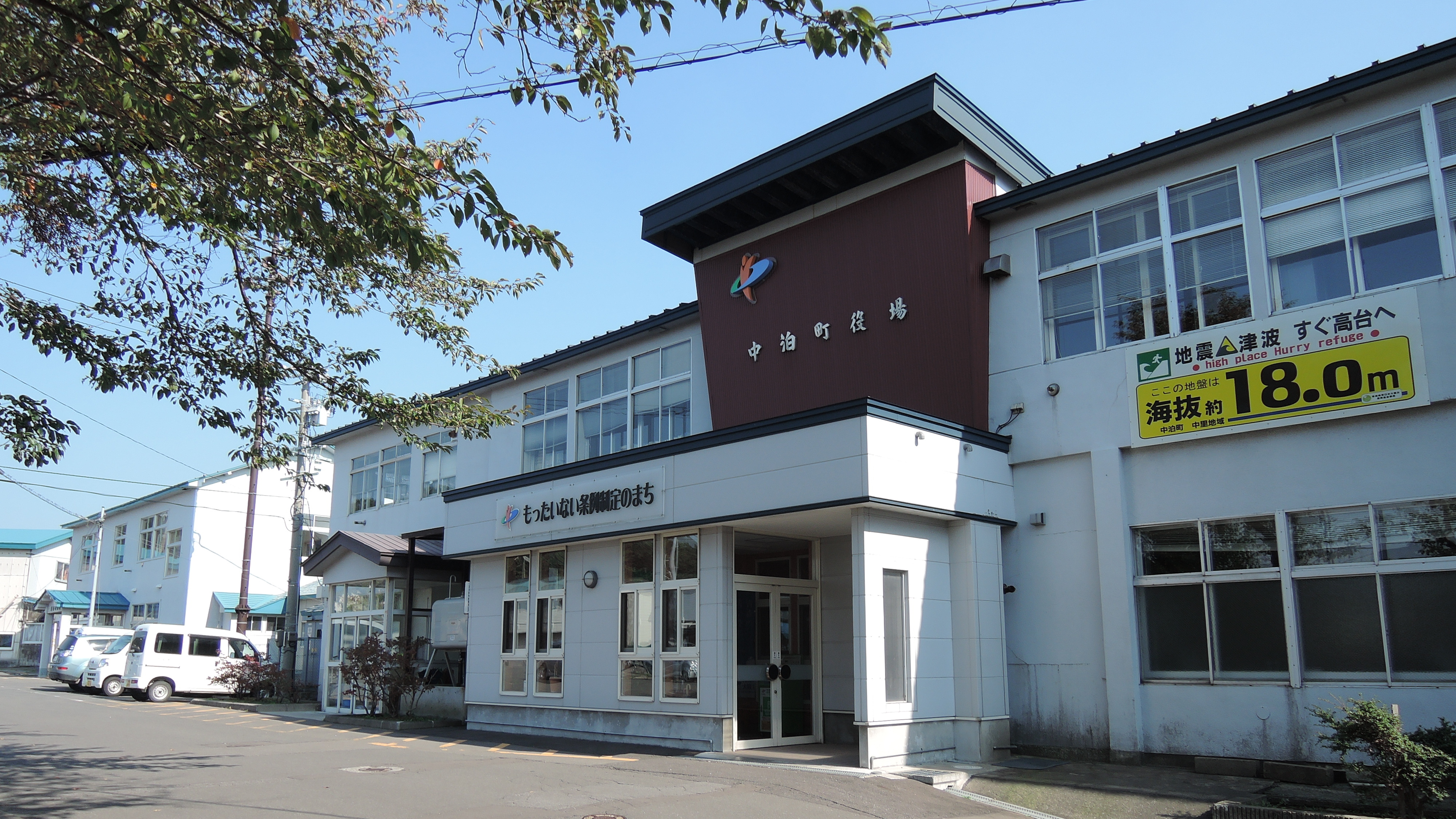
Nakadomari Town Hall

Nakadomari (中泊町, Nakadomari-machi) is a town located in Aomori Prefecture, Japan. As of 31 January 2023, the town had an estimated population of 9,981 in 4960 households, and a population density of 50 persons per km^{2}. The total area of the town is 216.34 square kilometres (83.53 sq mi).

== Geography ==
Nakadomari is in Kitatsugaru District of Aomori Prefecture, and consists of two discontinuous geographic areas in northern Tsugaru Peninsula. The larger area is in the south, and consists of the former town of Nakasato. The smaller area is in the north, and consists of the former village of Kodomari with a coastline on the Sea of Japan at the western end of Tsugaru Strait. The Kodomari Dam is located in the town.

=== Neighboring municipalities ===
Aomori Prefecture

- Goshogawara
- Sotogahama
- Tsugaru
- Yomogita

=== Climate ===
Nakadomari has a cold humid continental climate (Köppen Cfa) characterized by warm short summers and long cold winters with heavy snowfall. The average annual temperature in Nakadomari is 9.4 °C. The average annual rainfall is 1399 mm with September as the wettest month. The temperatures are highest on average in August, at around 22.3 °C, and lowest in January, at around -2.3 °C. Snowfall typically begins in late November and lasts through March and sometimes April. Blizzard-like conditions, created by strong winds and a heavy accumulation of snow, are common during winter. During these times visibility can be reduced to several feet or less.

Climate data for Nakadomari (1981-2010)
Month	Jan	Feb	Mar	Apr	May	Jun	Jul	Aug	Sep	Oct	Nov	Dec	Year
Mean daily maximum °C (°F)	1.8 (35.2)	2.3 (36.1)	5.9 (42.6)	12.0 (53.6)	16.6 (61.9)	20.6 (69.1)	24.1 (75.4)	26.7 (80.1)	23.1 (73.6)	17.3 (63.1)	10.8 (51.4)	4.8 (40.6)	13.8 (56.9)
Mean daily minimum °C (°F)	−3.6 (25.5)	−3.5 (25.7)	−1.2 (29.8)	3.3 (37.9)	8.0 (46.4)	12.6 (54.7)	17.3 (63.1)	19.2 (66.6)	14.6 (58.3)	8.4 (47.1)	3.2 (37.8)	−1.1 (30.0)	6.4 (43.6)
Average precipitation mm (inches)	111.4 (4.39)	77.4 (3.05)	65.3 (2.57)	72.6 (2.86)	95.3 (3.75)	80.8 (3.18)	135.7 (5.34)	155.9 (6.14)	156.3 (6.15)	123.4 (4.86)	143.5 (5.65)	118.7 (4.67)	1,336.3 (52.61)
Source: "Japan Meteorological Agency [2]".

== Demographics ==
Per Japanese census data, the population of Nakadomari peaked around the year 1960 and has decreased steadily since then. It is now less than it was a century ago.

Historical population
Year	Pop.	±%
1920	12,910	—
1930	14,414	+11.6%
1940	14,662	+1.7%
1950	21,189	+44.5%
1960	22,846	+7.8%
1970	21,061	−7.8%
1980	19,968	−5.2%
1990	17,354	−13.1%
2000	15,325	−11.7%
2010	12,743	−16.8%
2020	9,657	−24.2%

== History ==
The area around Nakadomari was controlled by the Tsugaru clan of Hirosaki Domain during the Edo period. With the establishment of the modern municipalities system on April 1, 1889, the villages of Nakasato and Kodomari were created within Kitatsugaru District, Aomori. Nakasato was raised to town status on September 10, 1941. The town of Nakadomari was created on March 28, 2005, as a result of the merger of Nakasato with Kodomari.

== Government ==
Nakadomari has a mayor-council form of government with a directly elected mayor and a unicameral town legislature of 15 members. Together with the city of Goshogawara, it contributes three members to the Aomori Prefectural Assembly. In terms of national politics, the town is part of Aomori 3rd district of the lower house of the Diet of Japan.

== Economy ==
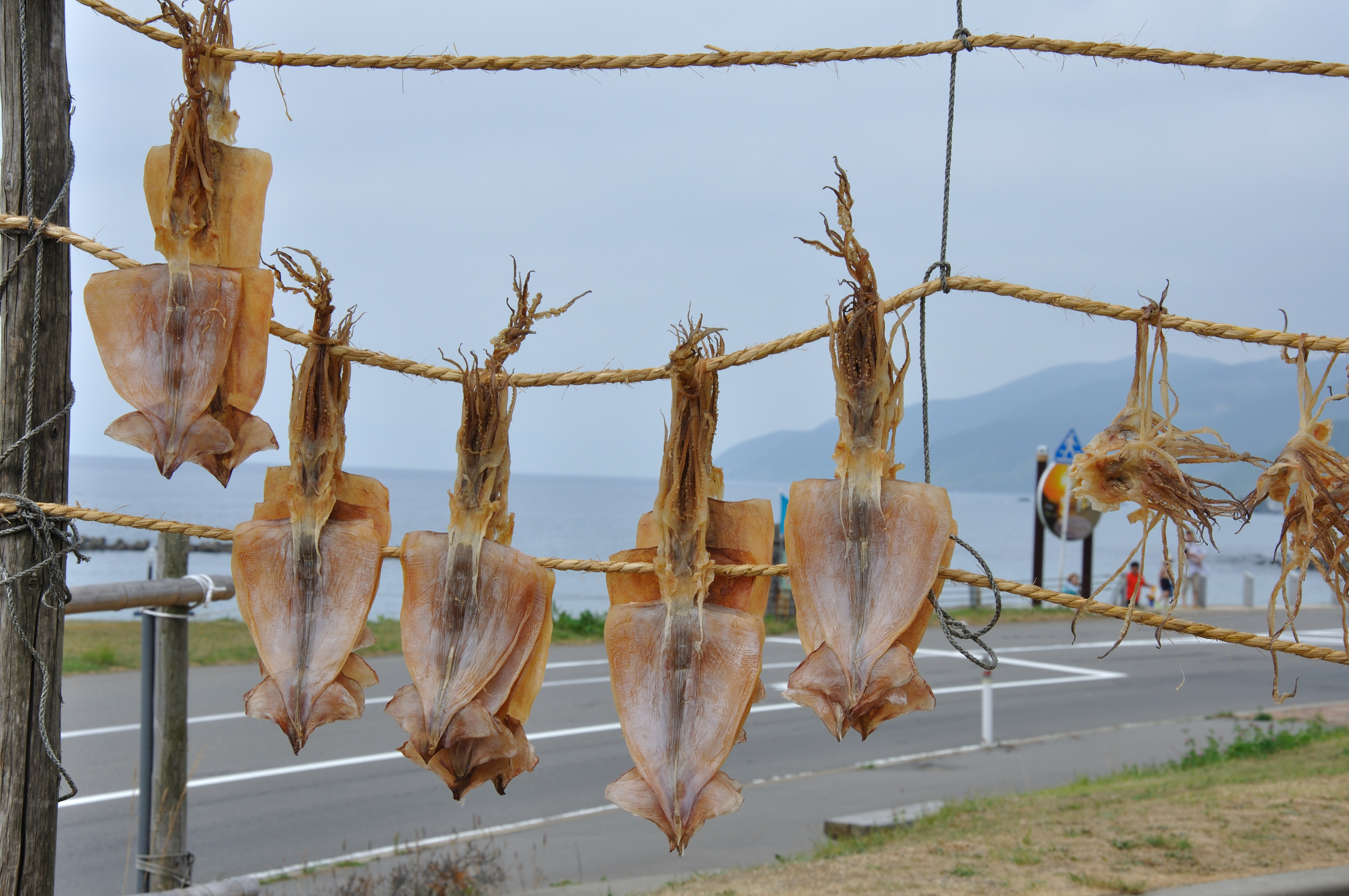
Squid drying in Kodomari

The economy of Nakadomari is heavily dependent on agriculture, forestry and commercial fishing.

== Education ==
Nakasato has four public elementary schools (three in Nakasato and one in Kodomari) and two public junior high schools (one in Kodomari and one in Nakasato) operated by the town government. The town has one public high school, located in Nakasato, operated by the Aomori Prefectural Board of Education.

== Transportation ==
=== Railway ===
Tsugaru Railway Source:

- Ōzawanai - Fukōda - Tsugaru-Nakasato,

=== Highway ===
- National Route 339

== Local attractions ==
- Lake Jūsan, National Historic Site

=== Culture ===
Nakadomari has several yearly festivals including a firefly festival, summer festival and winter snow festival. The area is known locally for producing high quality blueberries and dried squid.

== Noted people from Nakadomari ==
- Takarafuji Daisuke, sumo wrestler
- Ōnoshō Fumiya, sumo wrestler
- Kan Mikami, folk singer
