= Tsugaru-Nakasato Station =

Railway station in Nakadomari, Aomori Prefecture, Japan

Tsugaru-Nakasato Station 津軽中里駅
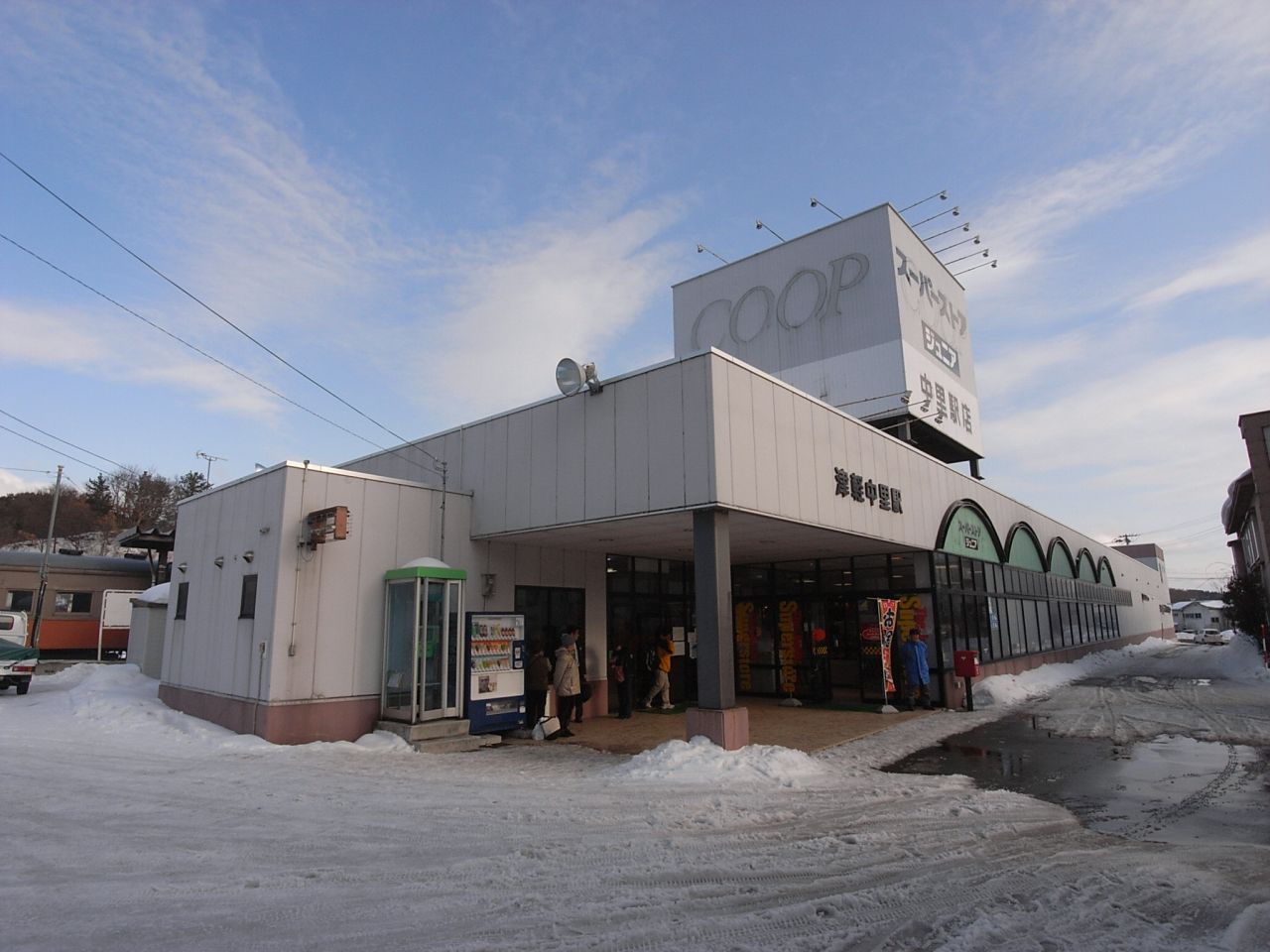
- Tsugaru-Nakasato Station in February 2008

General information
- Location: 225-1 Kameyama, Nakasato, Nakadomari-machi, Kitatsugaru-gun, Aomori-ken 037-0305; Japan
- Coordinates: 40°57′54″N 140°26′28″E
- Operator: Tsugaru Railway Company
- Line: ■ Tsugaru Railway Line
- Distance: 20.7 km from Tsugaru-Goshogawara
- Platforms: 1 (1 side platform)
- Tracks: 1

Other information
- Status: Staffed
- Website: Official website

History
- Opened: November 13, 1930

Services
Preceding station	Tsutetsu	Following station
Ōzawanai towards Tsugaru Goshogawara	Tsugaru Railway Line Semi-Express	Terminus
Fukōda towards Tsugaru Goshogawara	Tsugaru Railway Line Local	Terminus
Location
- Location within Aomori Prefecture Location within Japan

Tsugaru-Nakasato Station (津軽中里駅, Tsugaru-Nakasato-eki) is a railway station on the Tsugaru Railway Line in the town of Nakadomari, Aomori, Japan, operated by the private railway operator Tsugaru Railway Company.

== Lines ==
Tsugaru-Nakasato Station is the terminus of the Tsugaru Railway Line, and is located 20.7 km from the opposing terminus of the line at Tsugaru-Goshogawara.

== Station layout ==
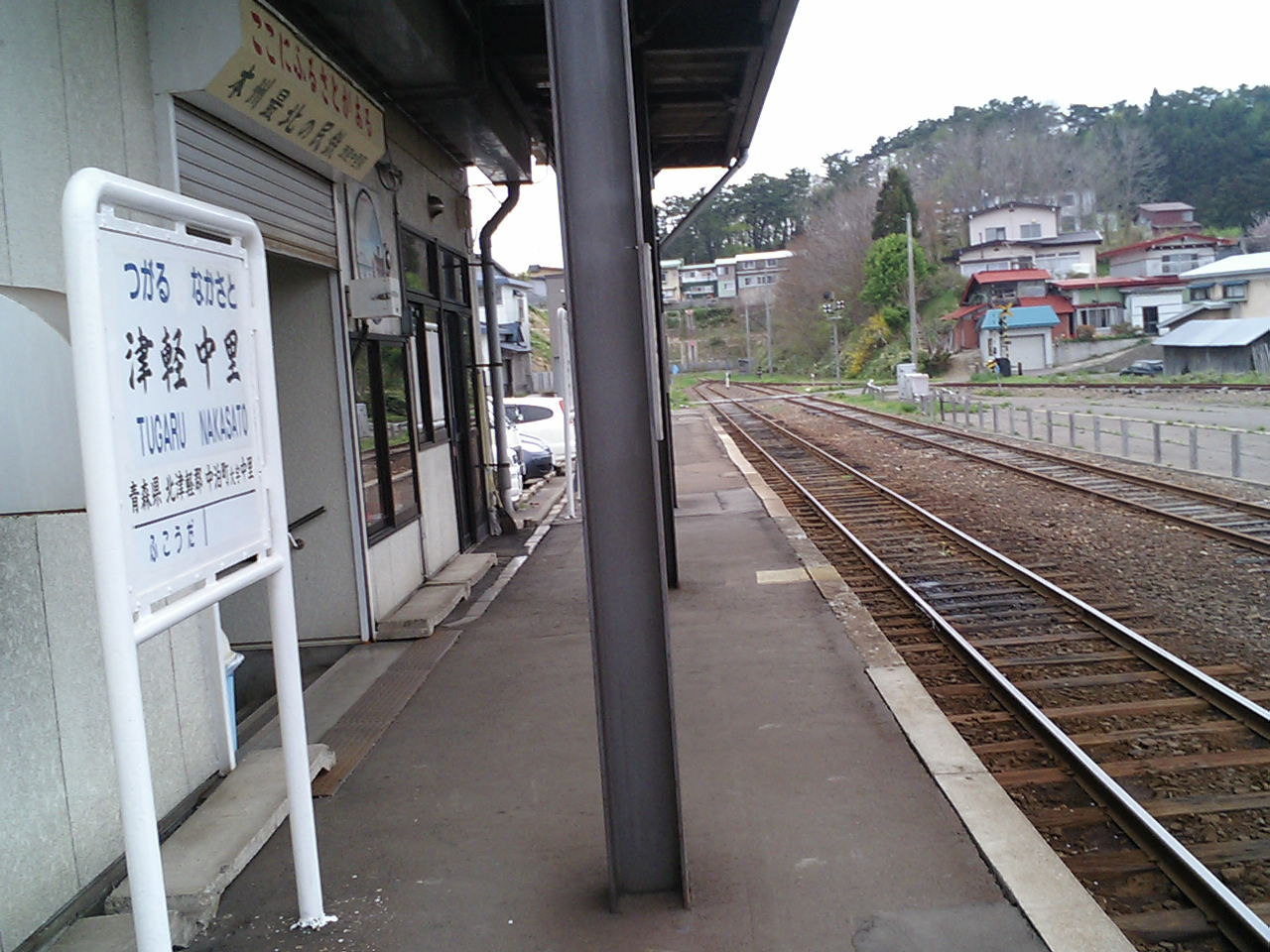
The station platform

The station has one side platform serving a single bidirectional line on a reversing headshunt. The station is staffed.

== History ==
Tsugaru-Nakasato Station was opened on November 13, 1930.

== Surrounding area ==
- Former Nakasato Town Hall
- Nakasato Post office

== See also ==
- List of railway stations in Japan
