= Tsugaru Railway Company =

Railway company in Japan

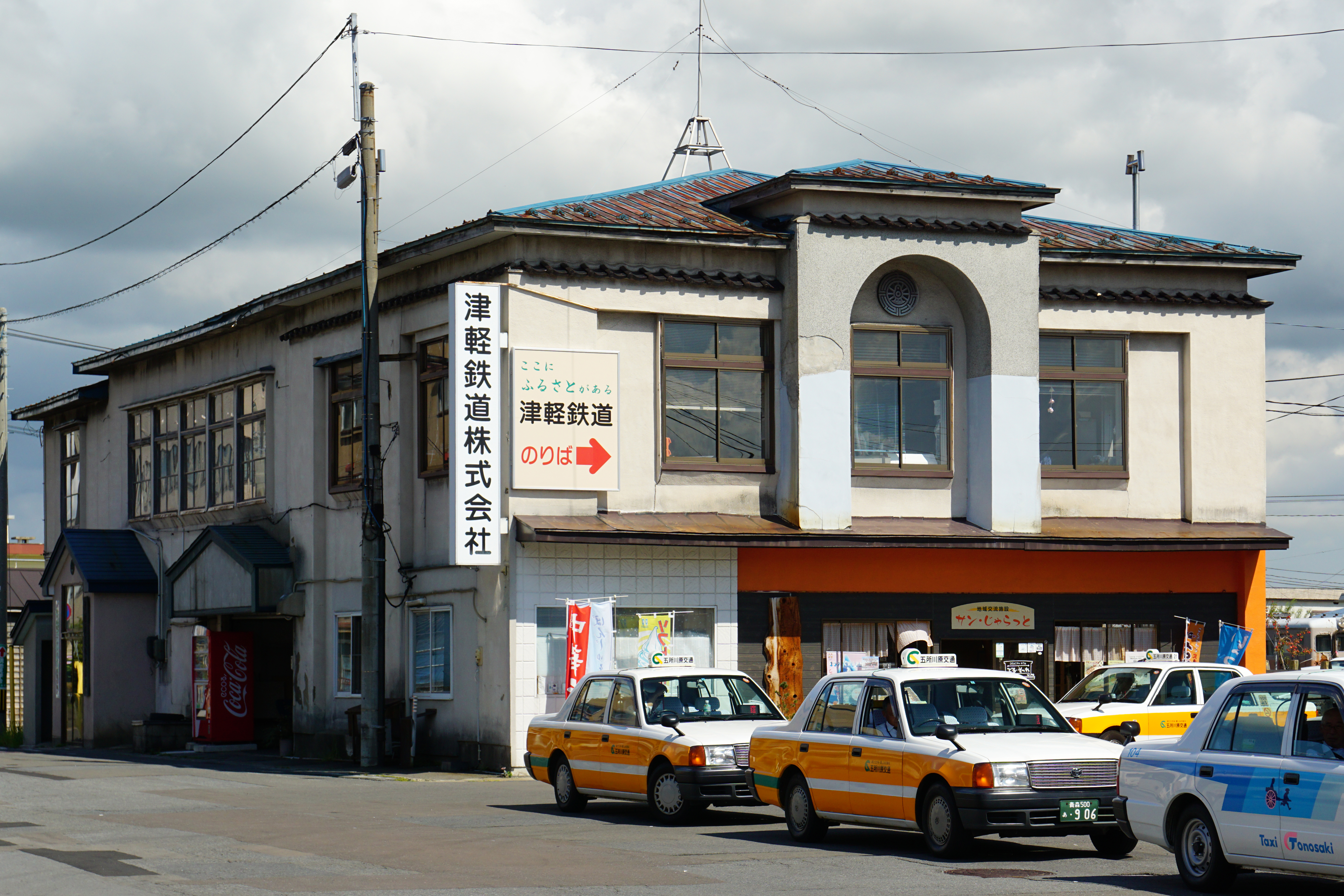
- Tsugaru Railway Company head office
- Native name: 津軽鉄道株式会社
- Type: Unlisted stock company
- Industry: Transportation
- Founded: 24 February 1928
- Headquarters: Goshogawara, Aomori, Japan
- Area served: Aomori Prefecture, Japan
- Services: Operation of Tsugaru Railway Line
- Website: http://tsutetsu.com/

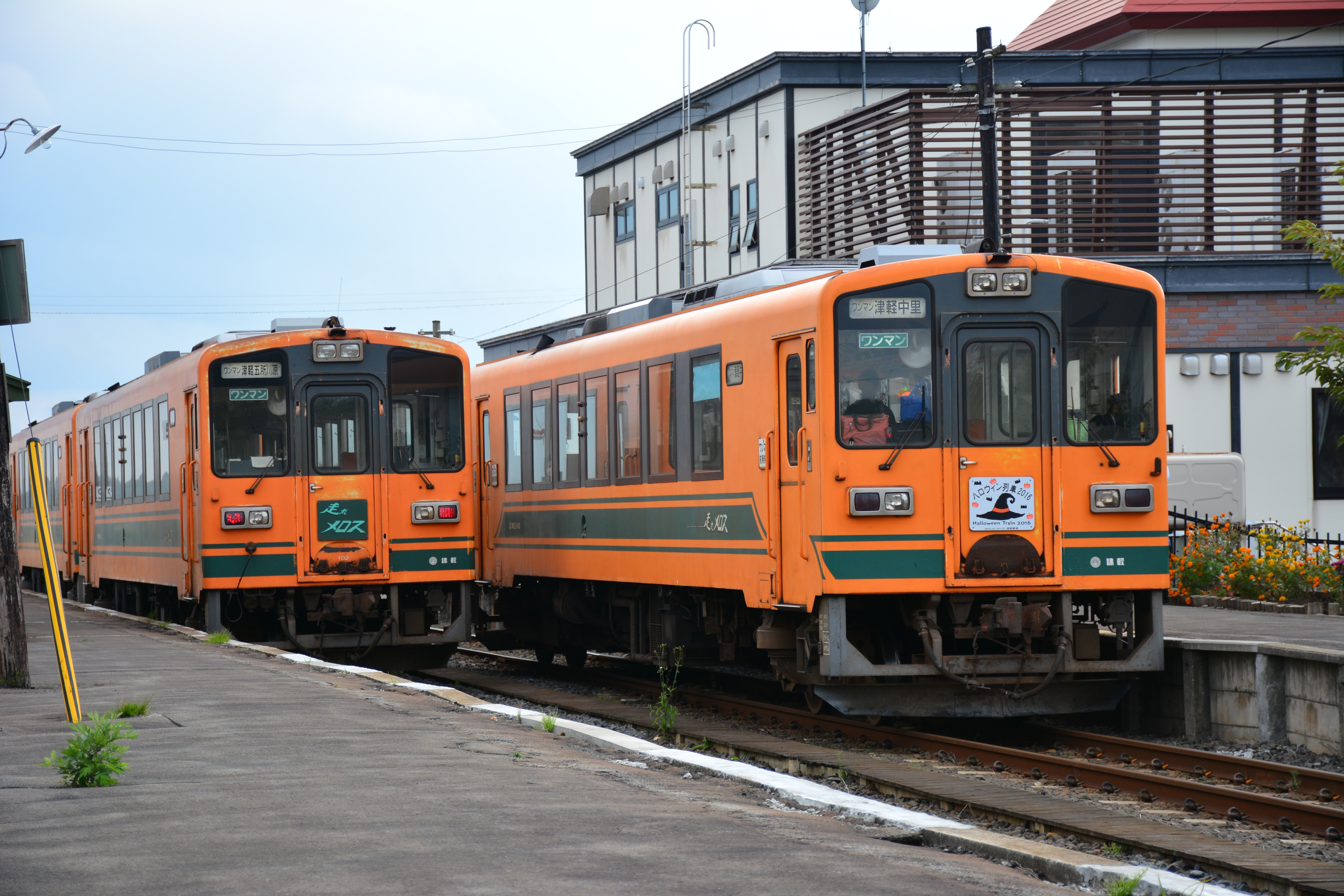
Tsugaru Railway 21 series DMUs at Kanagi Station

The Tsugaru Railway Company (津軽鉄道株式会社, Tsugaru Tetsudō Kabushiki Kaisha), also known as Tsutetsu (津鉄), is a railway company that provides transportation services in western Aomori Prefecture, Japan. The company operates the Tsugaru Railway Line, which connects Tsugaru-Goshogawara Station in the city of Goshogawara with Tsugaru-Nakasato Station in the town of Nakadomari in Tsugaru Peninsula. The company also operates, through subsidiary operations, taxi services. It is headquartered in the city of Goshogawara. It should not be confused with the JR East Tsugaru Line.

== History ==
The Tsugaru Railway was founded by former shareholders of the Mutsu Railroad (the forerunner to the JR East Gonō Line) on February 24, 1928, after that line was nationalized and became part of the Japanese Government Railways system. The new privately held Tsugaru Railway connected Goshogawara (present Tsugaru-Goshogawara Station) with Kanagi Station on July 15, 1930, and was extended to its present terminus, Nakasato Station (present Tsugaru-Nakasato), on November 13, 1930. Transit bus operations began on November 13, 1934. The bus subsidiary, Tsugaru Bus Company, was sold to the Kōnan Bus Company in 1955.

== Rail operations ==
The Tsugaru Railway Line is a Class 1 Railway Operator, operating twelve stations over a 20.7 kilometres (12.9 mi) route connecting Goshogawara with Nakasato. The line also runs a number of antique carriages equipped with coal-burning stoves during the winter, which serve as a local tourist attraction.
