= Goshogawara Station =

Railway station in Goshogawara, Aomori Prefecture, Japan

Goshogawara Station 五所川原駅
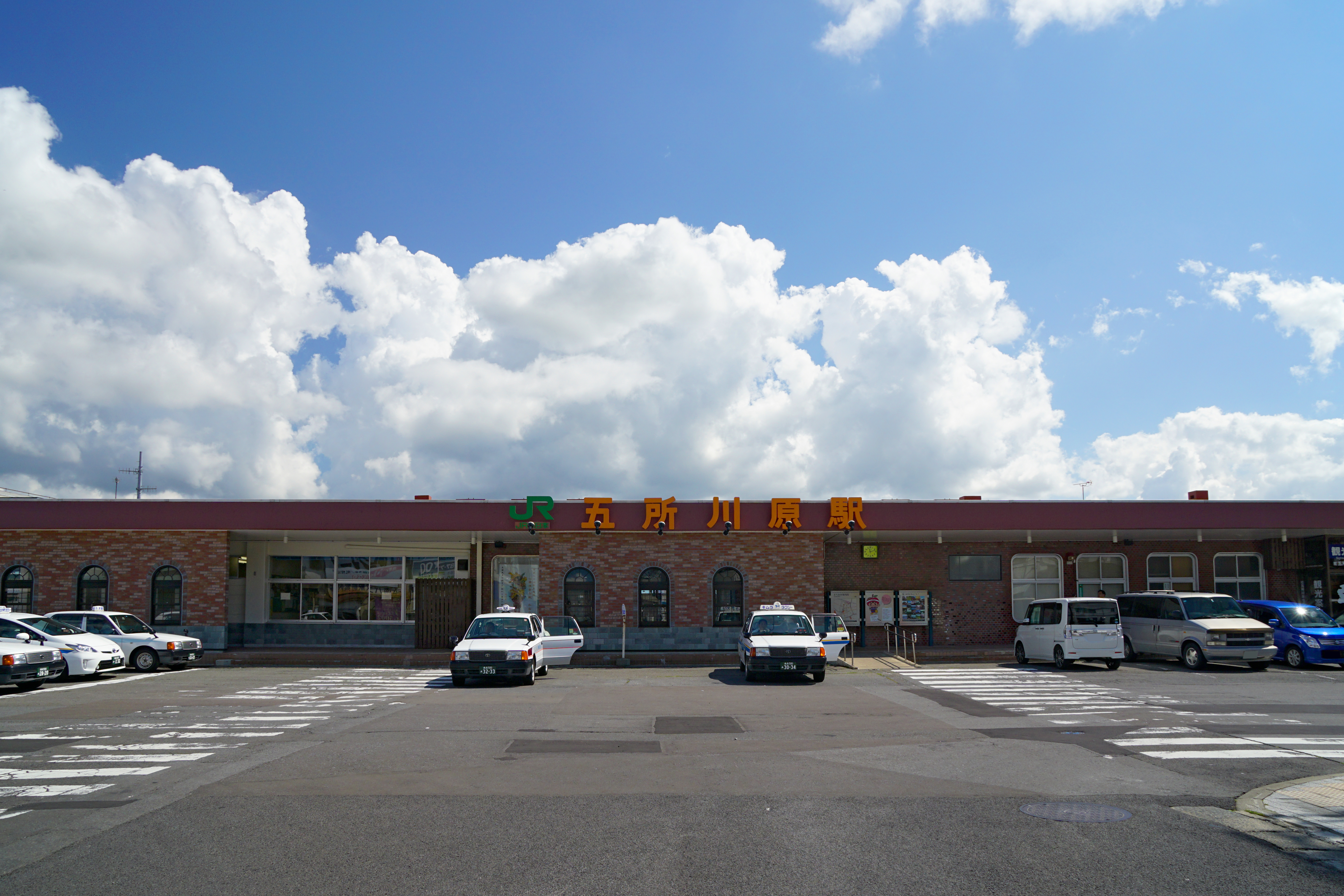
- Goshogawara Station in September 2014

General information
- Location: 38 Aza Omachi, Goshogawara City, Aomori Prefecture 037-0063; Japan
- Coordinates: 40°48′32″N 140°26′53″E
- Operator: JR East; Tsugaru Railway Company
- Lines: ■ Gonō Line; ■ Tsugaru Railway Line
Location
- Location within Aomori Prefecture Location within Tohoku, Japan Location within Japan

Goshogawara Station (五所川原駅, Goshogawara-eki) is a joint-use railway station on the Gonō Line and Tsugaru Railway Line in the city of Goshogawara, Aomori, Japan, jointly operated by East Japan Railway Company (JR East) and the private railway operator Tsugaru Railway Company.

Tsugaru Railway Company refers to the station as Tsugaru Goshogawara Station (津軽五所川原駅, Tsugaru Goshogawara-eki).

== Lines ==
Goshogawara Station is served by the JR East Gonō Line and forms the terminus of the Tsugaru Railway Line. It is located 125.7 km from the southern terminus of the Gonō Line at Higashi-Noshiro.

== Station layout ==
Goshogawara Station has a single side platform and an island platform serving three tracks. The JR Gono Line uses the side platform and half of the island platform, while the Tsugaru Line uses the other half of the island platform. The station building has a staffed Midori no Madoguchi ticket office. The exterior of the JR East station structure was rebuilt in 2013, reopening on 1 August 2013.

== JR East ==
Goshogawara Station 五所川原駅
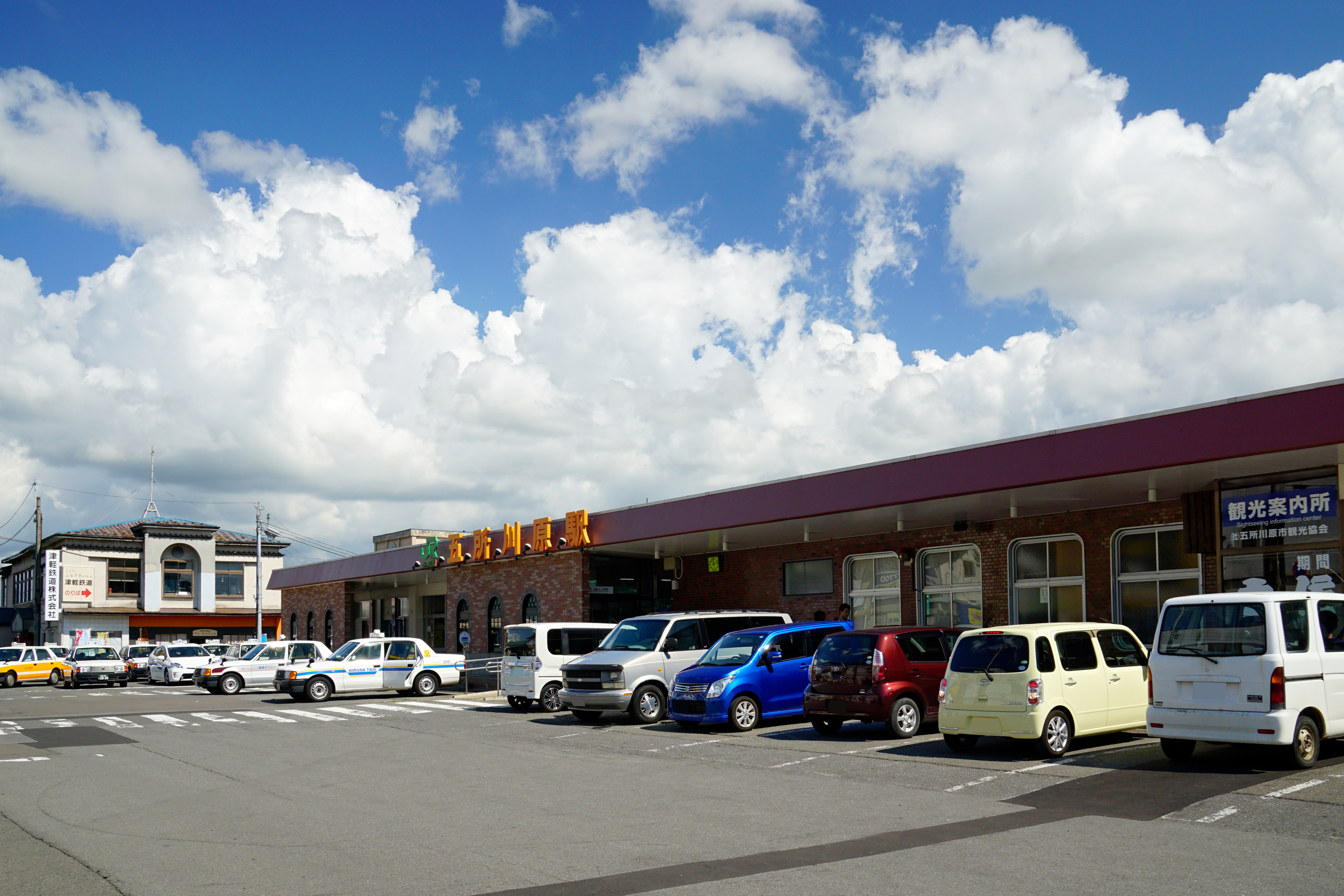
- JR East Goshogawara Station

General information
- Location: 38 Aza Omachi, Goshogawara City, Aomori Prefecture 037-0063; Japan
- Operator: JR East
- Line: ■ Gonō Line
- Platforms: 2 (1 island platform)
- Tracks: 2

Other information
- Status: Staffed (Midori no Madoguchi )
- Website: Official website

History
- Opened: 25 September 1918; 108 years ago

Passengers
- FY2021: 675 daily

Services
Preceding station	JR East	Following station
Kizukuri towards Higashi-Noshiro	Gonō Line Rapid	Mutsu-Tsuruda One-way operation
Kizukuri towards Higashi-Noshiro	Gonō Line Local	Mutsu-Tsuruda towards Hirosaki
Location

=== Platforms ===
1	■ Gonō Line	for Ajigasawa and Fukaura
	■ Gonō Line	for Hirosaki and Aomori (starting trains)
2	■ Gonō Line	for Hirosaki and Aomori

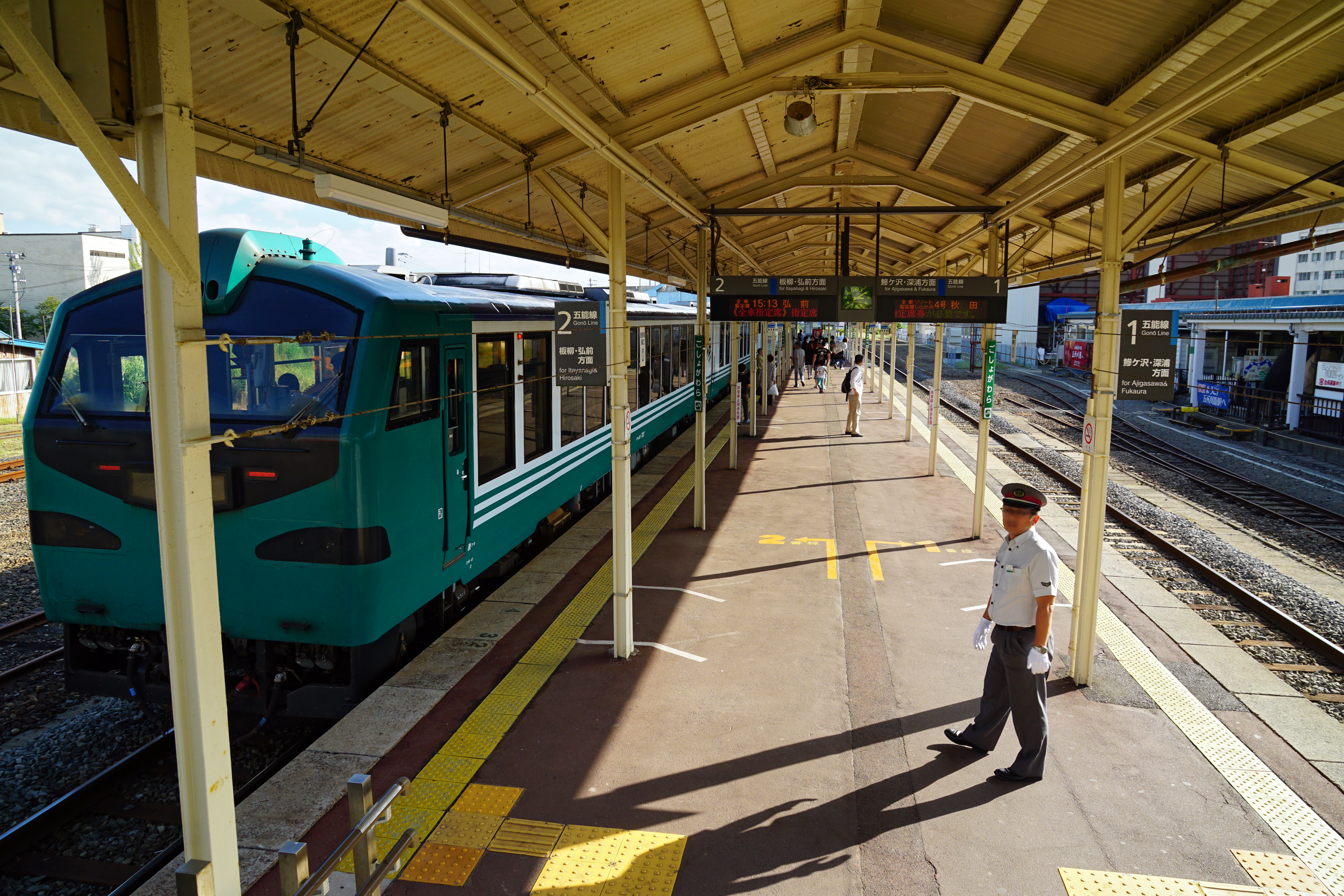
The Gono Line platforms

== Tsugaru Railway ==
Tsugaru Goshogawara Station 津軽五所川原駅
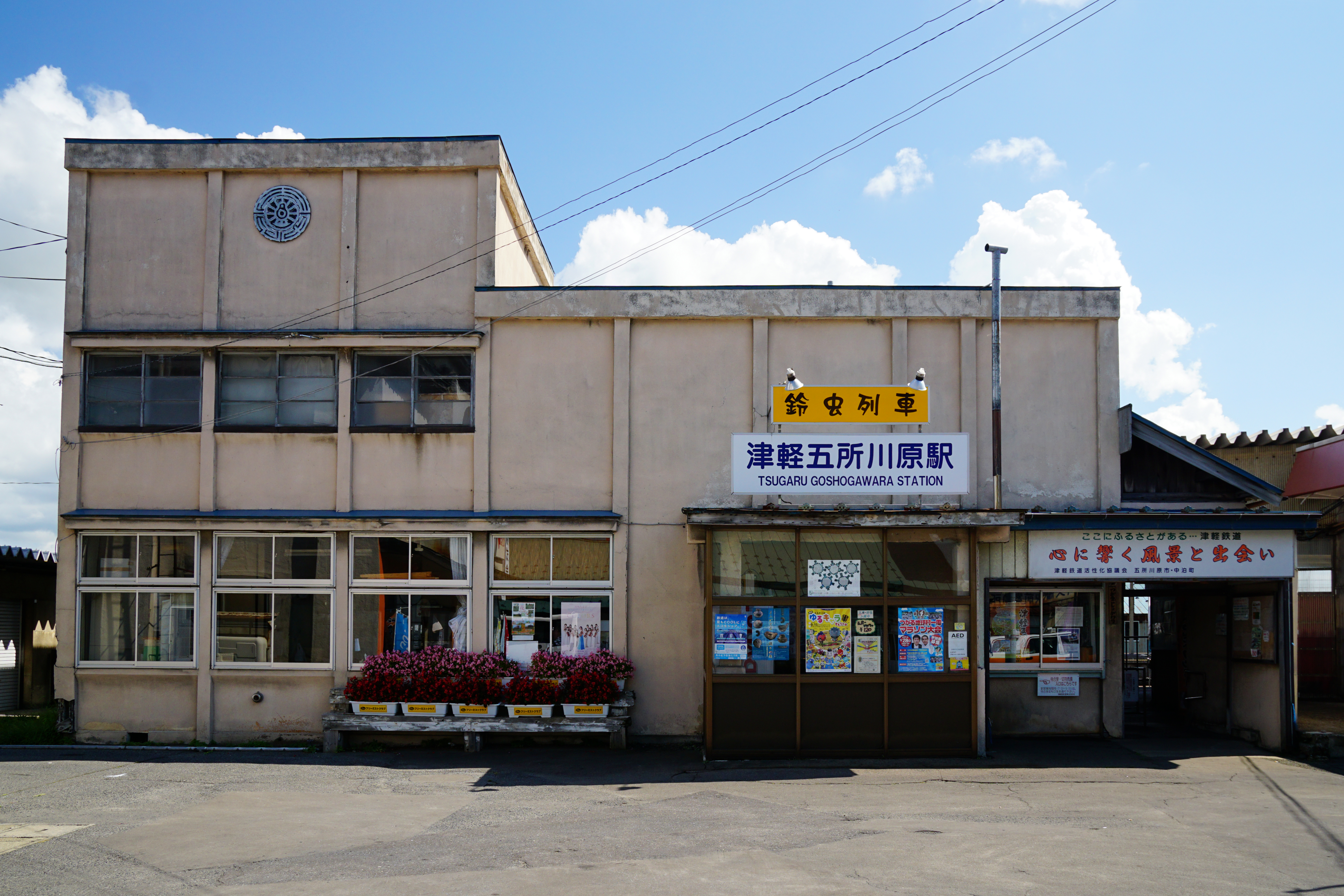
- Tsugaru Railway Goshogawara Station in May 2014

General information
- Location: 7-5 Omachi, Goshogawara-shi, Aomori-ken; Japan
- System: Tsugaru Railway station
- Operator: Tsugaru Railway
- Line: ■ Tsugaru Railway Line
- Platforms: 1 (1 side platform)

Other information
- Status: Staffed
- Website: Official website

History
- Opened: 15 July 1930
- Former names: Goshogawara (until 1956)

Passengers
- FY2015: 330 daily

Services
Preceding station	Tsutetsu	Following station
Terminus	Tsugaru Railway Line Semi-Express; Local	Togawa towards Tsugaru-Nakasato
Location

=== Platforms ===
3	■ Tsugaru Railway Line	for Kanagi and Tsugaru-Nakasato

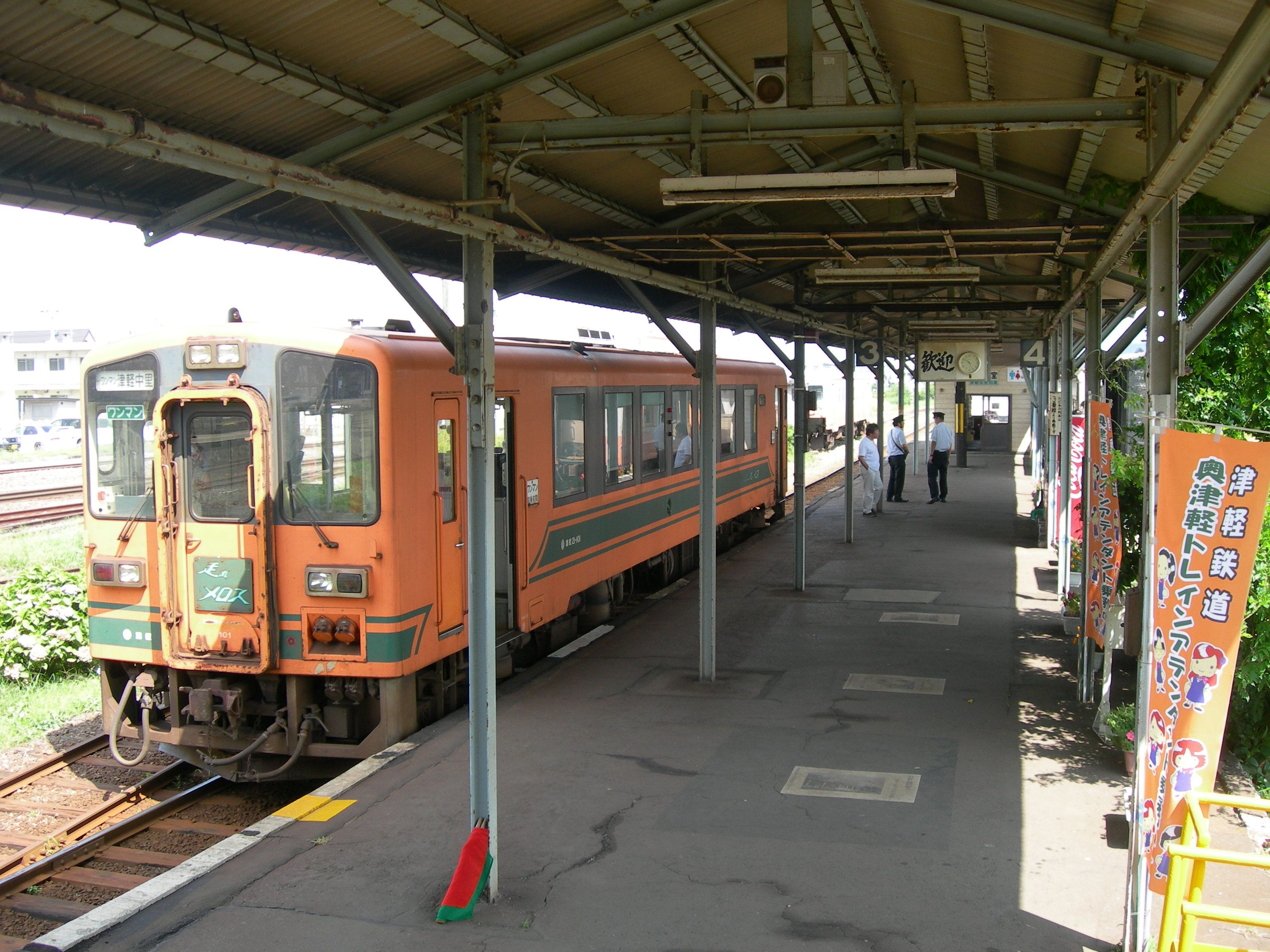
The Tsugaru Railway Line platform in August 2010

== History ==
Goshogawara Station opened on September 25, 1918, as a station on the Japanese National Railways (JNR) Goshogawara Line. On June 1, 1927, the Goshogawara Line was joined with the newly nationalized Mutsu Railway. The Tsugaru Railway Line began operations from Goshogawara on July 15, 1930. On July 10, 1956, the Tsugaru Railway portion of the station was officially renamed Tsugaru Goshogawara Station (津軽五所川原駅), to distinguish it from the JNR portion. With the privatization of JNR on April 1, 1987, the JNR portion came under the operational control of JR East.

== Passenger statistics ==
In fiscal 2016, the JR East station was used by an average of 894 passengers daily (boarding passengers only) The passenger figures for the JR East station in previous years are as shown below.

Fiscal year	Daily average
2000	1,228
2005	909
2010	863
2015	825

== Surrounding area ==
- National Route 101
- National Route 339
- Goshogawara Post office
- Goshogawara City Hall

== See also ==
- List of railway stations in Japan
