= List of populated places in Aomori Prefecture by population =

The following list sorts all cities (including towns and villages) in the Japanese prefecture of Aomori with a population of more than 5,000 according to the 2020 Census. As of October 1, 2020, 31 places fulfill this criterion and are listed here. This list refers only to the population of individual cities, towns and villages within their defined limits, which does not include other municipalities or suburban areas within urban agglomerations.

== List ==
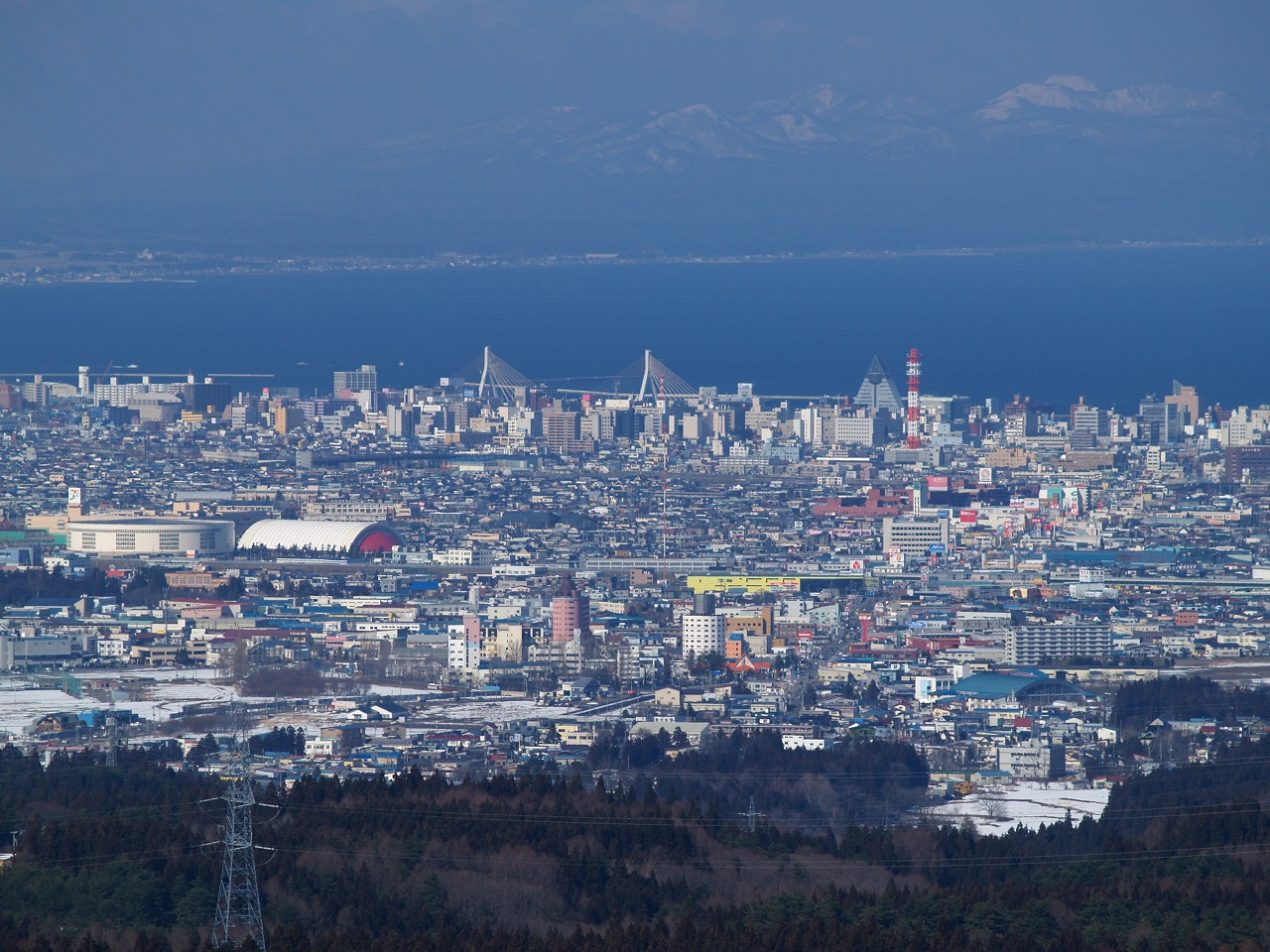
Aomori

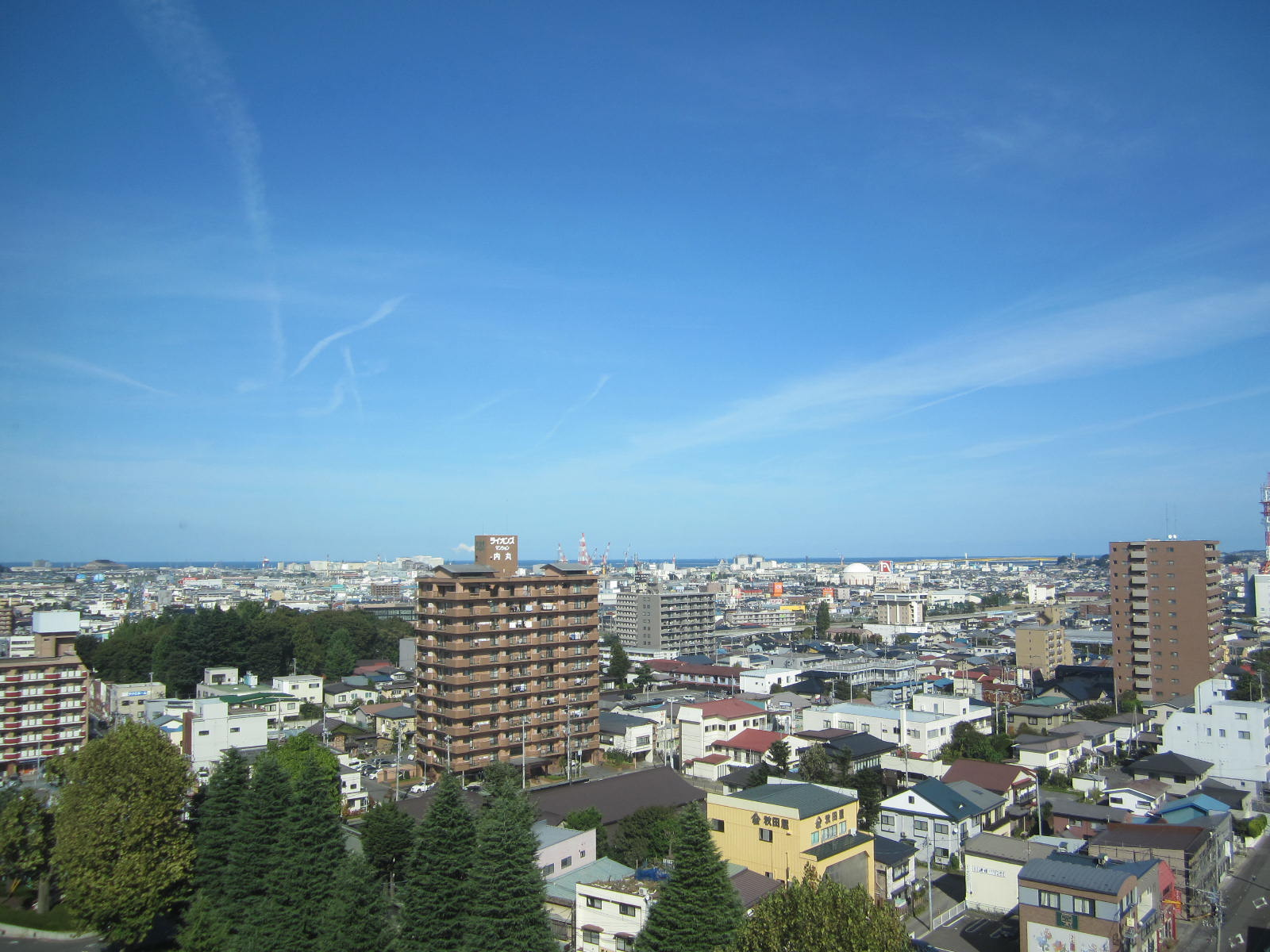
Hachinohe

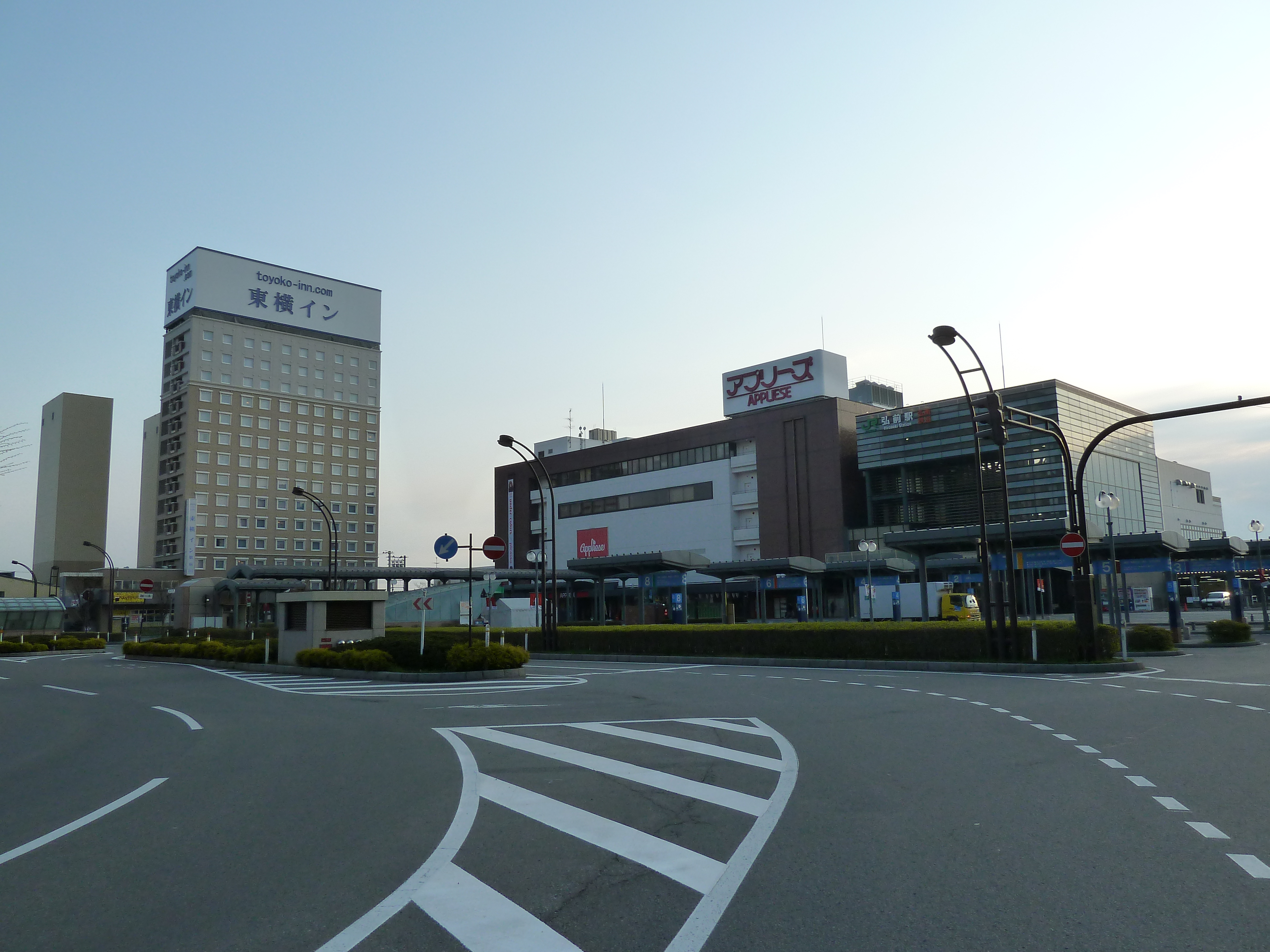
Hirosaki

The following table lists the 31 cities, towns and villages in Aomori with a population of at least 5,000 on October 1, 2020, according to the 2020 Census. The table also gives an overview of the evolution of the population since the 1995 census.

Rank (2020)	Name	Status	2020	2015	2010	2005	2000	1995
1	Aomori	City	275,340	287,648	299,520	311,386	318,732	314,917
2	Hachinohe	City	223,529	231,257	237,615	244,700	248,608	249,358
3	Hirosaki	City	168,564	177,411	183,473	189,043	193,217	194,197
4	Towada	City	60,420	63,429	66,110	68,359	69,630	69,146
5	Mutsu	City	54,122	58,493	61,066	64,052	67,022	67,969
6	Goshogawara	City	51,435	55,181	58,421	62,181	63,208	63,383
7	Misawa	City	39,181	40,196	41,258	42,425	42,495	41,605
8	Kuroishi	City	31,972	34,284	36,132	38,455	39,059	39,004
9	Tsugaru	City	30,979	33,316	37,243	40,091	41,320	42,384
10	Hirakawa	City	30,621	32,106	33,764	35,336	36,454	36,876
11	Oirase	Town	24,282	24,222	24,211	24,172	23,220	21,031
12	Nanbu	Town	16,822	18,312	19,853	21,552	22,596	23,041
13	Tōhoku	Town	16,441	17,955	19,106	20,016	20,591	21,270
14	Gonohe	Town	16,051	17,433	18,712	20,138	21,318	21,666
15	Fujisaki	Town	14,578	15,179	16,021	16,617	16,858	16,940
16	Shichinohe	Town	14,564	15,709	16,759	18,471	19,357	20,209
17	Hashikami	Town	13,506	14,025	14,699	15,356	15,618	14,428
18	Itayanagi	Town	12,712	13,935	15,227	16,222	16,840	17,320
19	Noheji	Town	12,389	13,524	14,314	15,218	16,012	15,969
20	Tsuruta	Town	12,077	13,392	14,270	15,218	15,795	16,126
21	Rokunohe	Town	10,456	10,423	10,241	10,430	10,481	10,523
22	Rokkasho	Village	10,369	10,536	11,095	11,401	11,849	11,063
23	Hiranai	Town	10,129	11,142	12,361	13,483	14,528	15,441
24	Nakadomari	Town	9,663	11,187	12,743	14,184	15,325	15,998
25	Sannohe	Town	9,090	10,135	11,299	12,261	13,223	13,740
26	Ajigasawa	Town	9,047	10,126	11,449	12,662	13,551	14,077
27	Ōwani	Town	8,671	9,676	10,978	11,921	12,881	13,990
28	Fukaura	Town	7,346	8,429	9,691	10,910	11,799	12,546
29	Inakadate	Village	7,328	7,783	8,153	8,541	8,835	9,151
30	Higashidōri	Village	5,956	6,607	7,252	8,042	7,975	8,045
31	Sotogahama	Town	5,410	6,198	7,089	8,215	9,170	9,813
