= Fujisaki =

Fujisaki may refer to:

- Fujisaki (surname)
- Fujisaki, Aomori, a town in Minamitsugaru District, Aomori Prefecture, Japan
- Fujisaki Station (disambiguation), multiple railway stations in Japan

== See also ==
- Fujisaki Hachiman-gū, a Shinto shrine in Chūō-ku, Kumamoto, Japan
