= Tsurugasaka Station =

Railway station in Aomori, Aomori Prefecture, Japan

Tsurugasaka Station 鶴ヶ坂駅
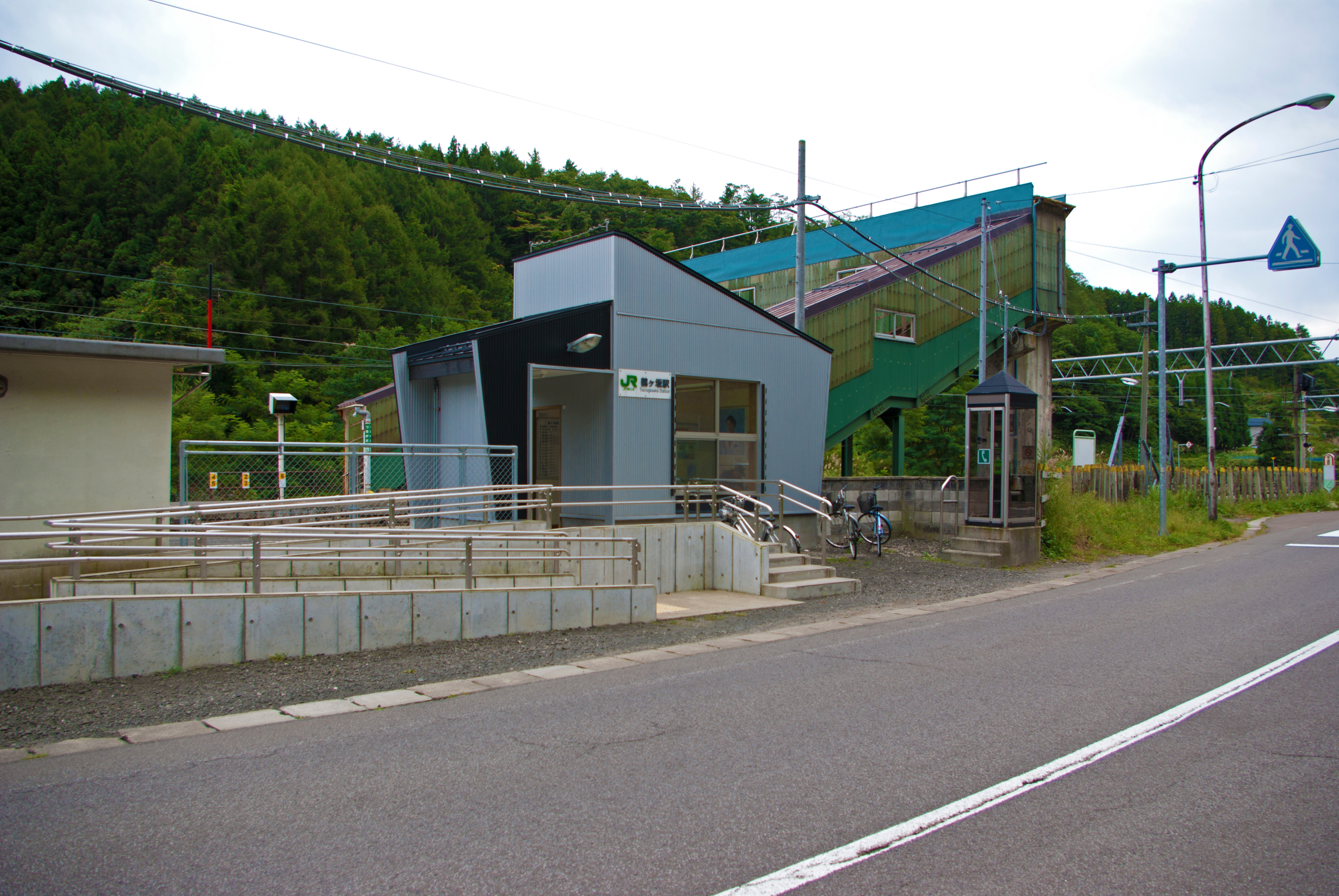
- Tsurugasaka Station in September 2009

General information
- Location: Tsurugasaka Kawai 91-3, Aomori-shi, Aomori-ken 038-0045; Japan
- Coordinates: 40°47′28.5″N 140°38′05.5″E
- Operator: JR East
- Line: ■ Ōu Main Line
- Distance: 473.4 km from Fukushima
- Platforms: 2 side platforms
- Tracks: 2

Other information
- Status: Unstaffed
- Website: Official website

History
- Opened: January 20, 1933
- Rebuilt: 2007

Services
Preceding station	JR East	Following station
Daishaka towards Shinjō	Ōu Main Line Local	Tsugaru-Shinjō towards Aomori
Location
- Location within Aomori Prefecture Location within Japan

Tsurugasaka Station (鶴ヶ坂駅, Tsurugasaka-eki) is a railway station on the northern Ōu Main Line in the city of Aomori, Aomori Prefecture, Japan, operated by East Japan Railway Company (JR East).

== Lines ==
Tsurugasaka Station is served by the Ōu Main Line, and is located 473.4 km from the starting point of the line at Fukushima.

== Station layout ==
The station has two opposed side platforms, connected to the station building by a footbridge. The station is unattended.

=== Platforms ===
1	■ Ōu Main Line	for Aomori
2	■ Ōu Main Line	for Hirosaki and Higashi-Noshiro

== History ==
Tsurugasaka Station was opened on November 15, 1929 as the Tsurugasaka Signal. It was upgraded to a station on the Japanese Government Railways (JGR), the pre-war predecessor to Japanese National Railways (JNR) on January 20, 1933. With the privatization of JNR on April 1, 1987, the station came under the operational control of JR East. A new station building was completed in July 2007.

== Surrounding area ==
- Tarapoki onsen

== Bus services ==
- Aomori Municipal Bus
  - For Aomori Station via Shinjō and Furukawa
  - For Namioka Station via Daishaka
  - For Magonai
- Konan Bus
  - For Kuroishi via Namioka and Tobinai
  - For Gosyogawara via Daishaka and Harako
  - For Yadame via Shinjō, Aomori Station and Shinmachi

== See also ==
- List of railway stations in Japan
