= Mutsu-Tsuruda Station =

Railway station in Tsuruda, Aomori Prefecture, Japan

Mutsu-Tsuruda Station 陸奥鶴田駅
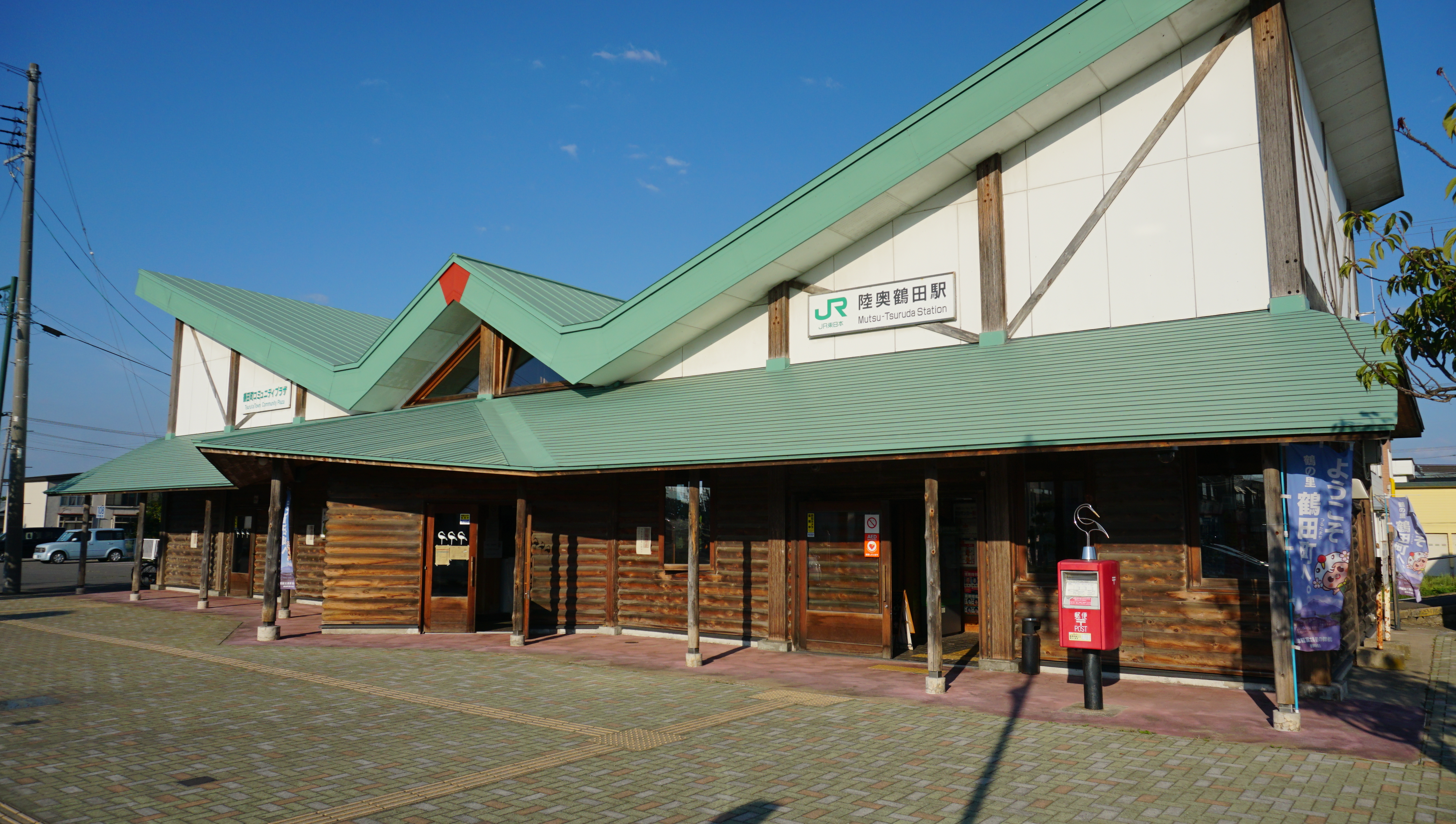
- Mutsu-Tsuruda Station in September 2019

General information
- Location: Maeda 38, Tsuruta-cho, Kitatsugaru-gun, Aomori-ken 038-3503; Japan
- Coordinates: 40°45′26.52″N 140°26′06.91″E
- Operator: JR East
- Line: ■ Gonō Line
- Distance: 131.7 kilometers from Higashi-Noshiro
- Platforms: 1 side platform

Other information
- Status: Unstaffed
- Website: www.jreast.co.jp/estation/station/info.aspx?StationCd=1542

History
- Opened: September 25, 1918

Passengers
- FY2016: 195

Services
Preceding station	JR East	Following station
Goshogawara towards Higashi-Noshiro	Gonō Line Rapid	Tsurudomari One-way operation
Goshogawara towards Higashi-Noshiro	Gonō Line Local	Tsurudomari towards Hirosaki
Location
- Location within Japan

Mutsu-Tsuruda Station (陸奥鶴田駅, Mutsu-Tsuruda-eki) is a railway station located in the town of Tsuruta, Aomori Prefecture Japan, operated by the East Japan Railway Company (JR East).

== Lines ==
Mutsu-Tsuruda Station is served by the Gonō Line, and is 131.7 rail kilometers from the terminus of the line at Higashi-Noshiro.

== Station layout ==
Mutsu-Tsuruda Station has a single island platform; however, one track is not used, making it effectively a side platform station serving bi-directional traffic. The station building is staffed during normal daytime hours.

== Route bus ==
- Kōnan Bus
  - For Goshogawara Station

== History ==
Mutsu-Tsuruda Station was opened on September 25, 1918 as a station on the Mutsu Railway. It became a station on the Japan National Railways (JNR) when the Mutsu Railway was nationalized on June 1, 1927. With the privatization of the JNR on April 1, 1987, it came under the operational control of JR East.

== Passenger statistics ==
In fiscal 2016, the station was used by an average of 195 passengers daily (boarding passengers only).

== Surrounding area ==
- National Route 339
- Tsuruta Town Hall
- Tsuruta Post office
- Tsuruta High School

== See also ==
- List of railway stations in Japan
