= Tsugaru Fujimi Lake =

- 津軽富士見湖 (Japanese)
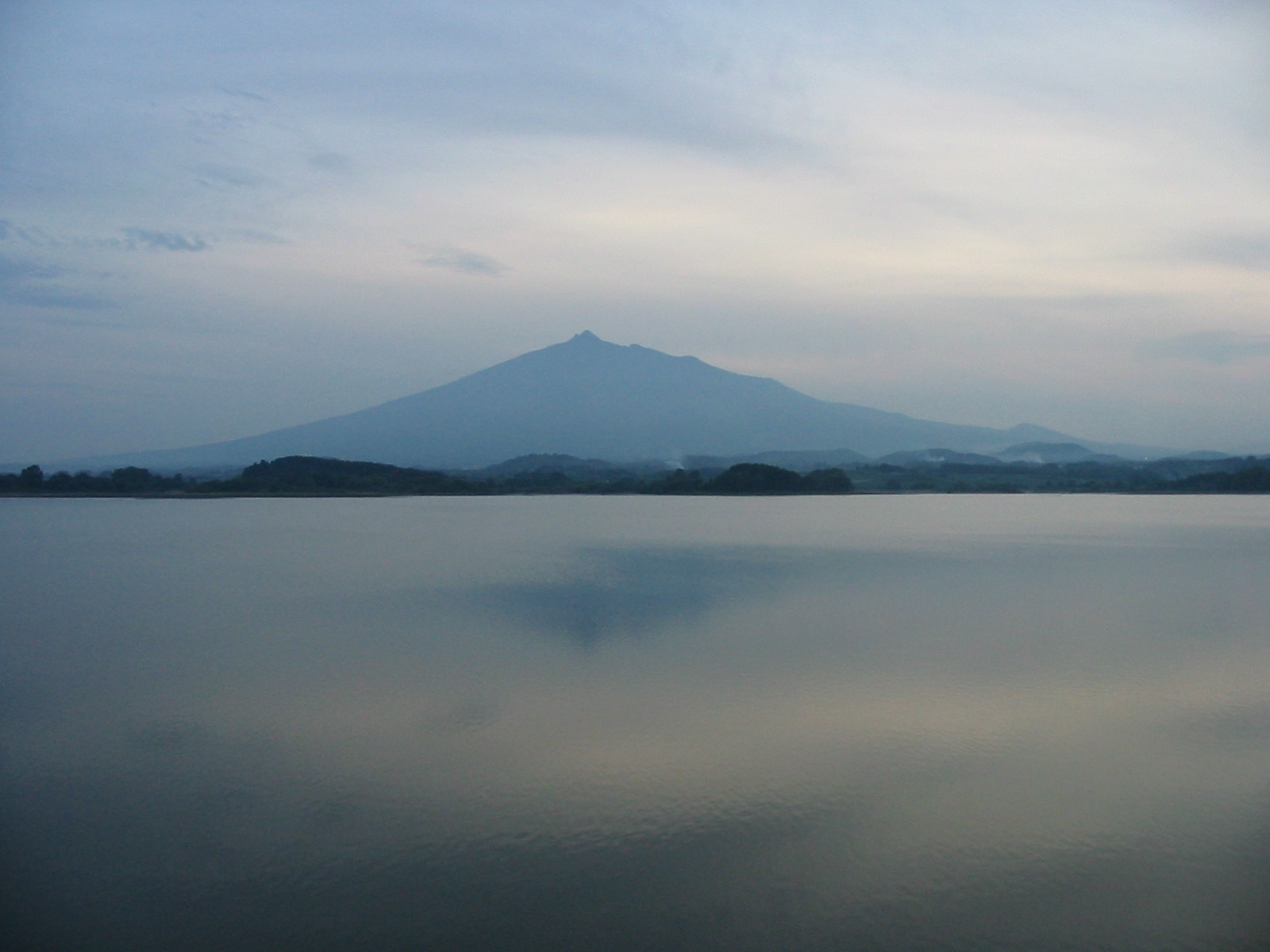
- Tsugaru Fujimi Lake with Mount Iwaki in the background

- Location within Aomori Prefecture Location within Japan
- Location: Aomori Prefecture, Honshū, Japan
- Coordinates: 40°44′46″N 140°23′46″E
- Type: Reservoir
- Primary inflows: Snowmelt
- Primary outflows: Iwaki River
- Basin countries: Japan

Tsugaru Fujimi Lake (津軽富士見湖, Tsugaru Fujimi-ko) also known as Mawarizeki Ōtameike (廻堰大溜池) is a reservoir that is located almost entirely within the town of Tsuruta in Aomori Prefecture, Japan, though a portion of its southern shore lies within the city of Hirosaki. It was built in 1660 to collect snowmelt in order to irrigate the fields in the surrounding area.

== History ==
The reservoir's construction was ordered by Tsugaru Nobumasa, daimyō of the Hirosaki Domain in 1660 in order to collect water from snowmelt. Upon completion, its 4.2-kilometer-long (2.6 mi) retaining wall became the longest embankment dam in Japan, a record it still holds. In 2010, it was selected by the Ministry of Agriculture, Forestry and Fisheries as one of the 100 best reservoirs in Japan.
