= Daishaka Station =

Railway station in Aomori, Aomori Prefecture, Japan

Daishaka Station 大釈迦駅
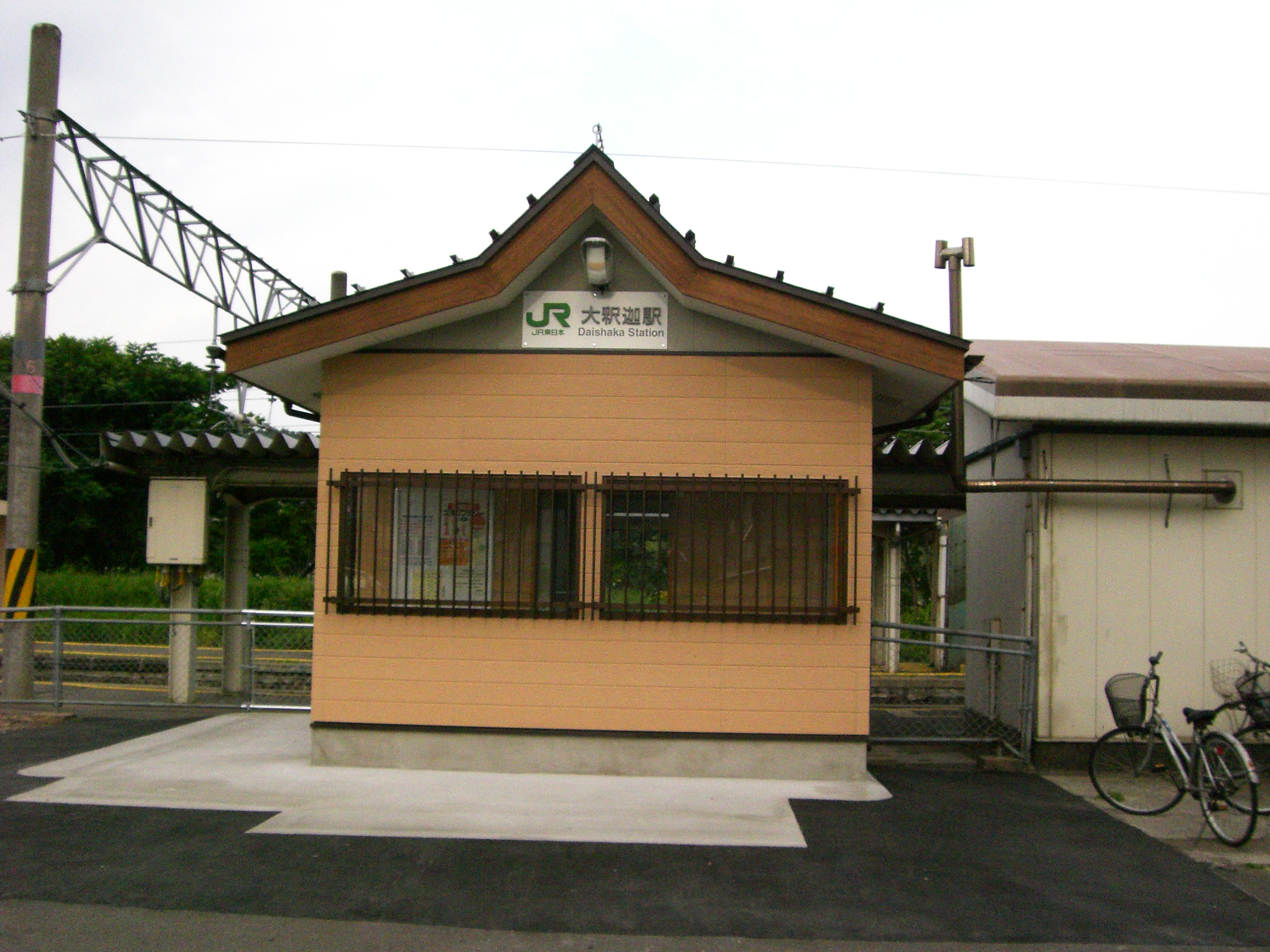
- Daishiki Station in August 2007

General information
- Location: Namioka Daishaka Maeda 80, Aomori-shi, Aomori-ken 038-1301; Japan
- Coordinates: 40°45′24.04″N 140°35′15.42″E
- Operator: JR East
- Line: ■ Ōu Main Line
- Distance: 467.2 km from Fukushima
- Platforms: 1 side + 1 island platform

Other information
- Status: Unstaffed
- Website: Official website

History
- Opened: December 1, 1894

Services
Preceding station	JR East	Following station
Namioka towards Shinjō	Ōu Main Line Local	Tsurugasaka towards Aomori
Location
- Location within Aomori Prefecture Location within Japan

Daishaka Station (大釈迦駅, Daishaka-eki)is a railway station located in the city of Aomori, Aomori Prefecture, Japan, operated by the East Japan Railway Company (JR East)

== Lines ==
Daishaka Station is served by the Ōu Main Line, and is located 467.2 km from the southern terminus of the line at Fukushima.

== Station layout ==
The station has one side platform and one island platform serving three tracks, connected to the station building by a footbridge. The station is unattended.

=== Platforms ===
1	■ Ōu Main Line	for Shin-Aomori and Aomori
2	■ Ōu Main Line	for Kawabe and Hirosaki
3	■ Ōu Main Line	(siding)

Note: Track 3 is used primarily for freight trains changing direction.

== History ==
Daishaka Station was opened on December 1, 1894 as a station on the Japanese Government Railways, the predecessor to the Japan National Railway (JNR) in former Namioka village. With the privatization of the JNR on April 1, 1987, it came under the operational control of JR East. A new station building was completed in July 2007.

== Surrounding area ==
- National Route 7
- National Route 101
- Daishaka Post Office

== See also ==
- List of railway stations in Japan
