= Tsurudomari Station =

Railway station in Tsuruda, Aomori Prefecture, Japan

Tsurudomari Station 鶴泊駅
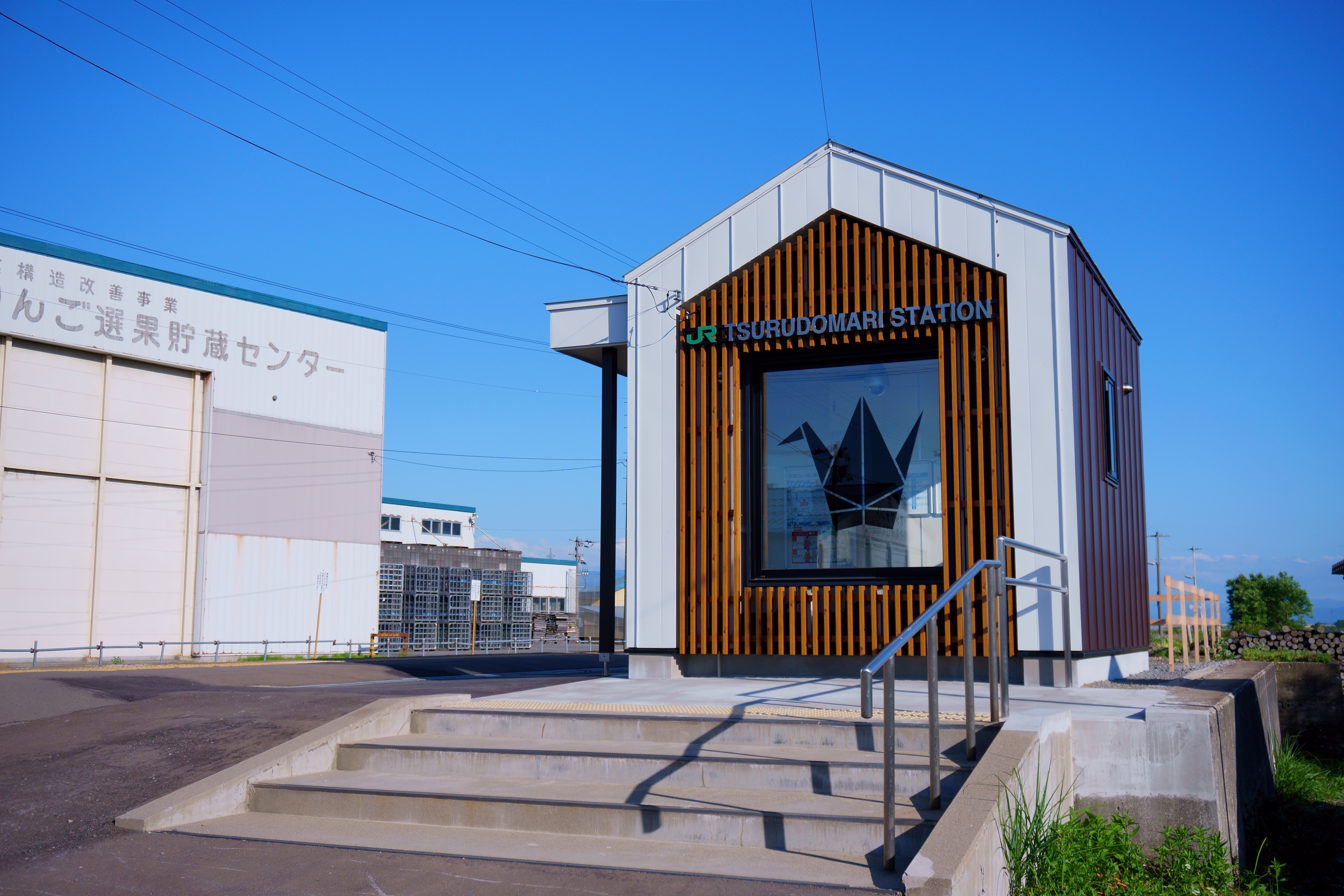
- Tsurudomari Station in June 2020

General information
- Location: Umebayashi 91, Tsuruta-machi, Kitatsugaru-gun, Aomori-ken 038-3522; Japan
- Coordinates: 40°44′08.14″N 140°26′16.52″E
- Operator: JR East
- Line: ■ Gonō Line
- Distance: 97.4 km from Higashi-Noshiro
- Platforms: 1 side platform

Other information
- Status: Unstaffed
- Website: Official website (in Japanese)

History
- Opened: September 25, 1918

Services
| Preceding station | JR East | Following station |
|---|---|---|
| Mutsu-Tsuruda towards Higashi-Noshiro | Gonō Line Rapid | Itayanagi One-way operation |
| Mutsu-Tsuruda towards Higashi-Noshiro | Gonō Line Local | Itayanagi towards Hirosaki |
Location
- Location within Japan

Tsurudomari Station (鶴泊駅, Tsurudomari-eki) is a railway station located in the town of Tsuruta, Aomori Prefecture, Japan, operated by the East Japan Railway Company (JR East).

== Lines ==
Tsurudomari Station is a station on the Gonō Line and is located 134.1 kilometers from the terminus of the line at Higashi-Noshiro.

== Station layout ==
Tsurudomari Station has one ground-level side platform serving a single bi-directional track. The station building is unattended.

== History ==
Tsurudomari Station was opened on September 25, 1918 as a station on the Mutsu Railway. It became a station on the Japan National Railways (JNR) when the Mutsu Railway was nationalized on June 1, 1927. With the privatization of the JNR on April 1, 1987, it came under the operational control of JR East. Tsurudomari Station is a simple consignment station, administered by Goshogawara Station and operated by JA Itayanagi.

== Surrounding area ==
- National Route 339

== See also ==
- List of railway stations in Japan
