= Tsugaru-Shinjō Station =

Railway station in Aomori, Aomori Prefecture, Japan

Tsugaru-Shinjō Station 津軽新城駅
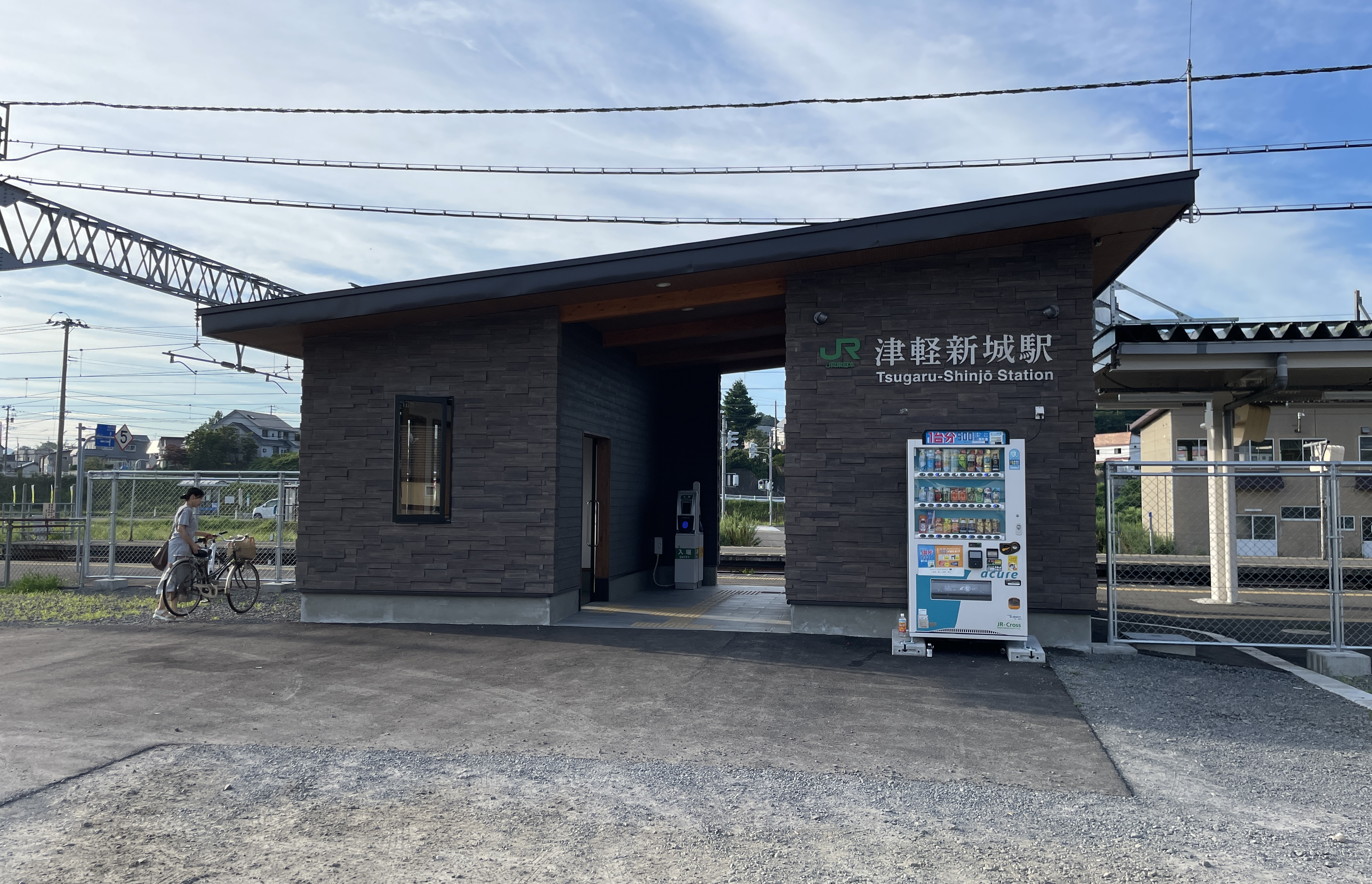
- Tsugaru-Shinjō Station in August 2023

General information
- Location: 376 Yamada, Shinjō, Aomori-shi, Aomori-ken 038-0042; Japan
- Coordinates: 40°49′40.88″N 140°40′19.46″E
- Operator: JR East
- Line: ■ Ōu Main Line
- Distance: 478.8 km from Fukushima
- Platforms: 1 side + 1 island platform

Other information
- Status: Staffed (Midori no Madoguchi )
- Website: Official website

History
- Opened: 1 December 1894
- Former names: Shinjō (until 1915)

Passengers
- FY2018: 365 daily

Services
Preceding station	JR East	Following station
Namioka towards Akita	Ōu Main Line Rapid	Shin-Aomori towards Aomori
Tsurugasaka towards Shinjō	Ōu Main Line Local	Shin-Aomori towards Aomori
Location
- Location within Aomori Prefecture Location within Japan

Tsugaru-Shinjō Station (津軽新城駅, Tsugaru-Shinjō-eki) is a railway station located in the city of Aomori, Aomori Prefecture, Japan, operated by the East Japan Railway Company (JR East).

== Lines ==
Tsugaru-Shinjō Station is served by the Ōu Main Line, and is located 478.8 km from the southern terminus of the Ōu Main Line at Fukushima.

== Station layout ==
The station has one side platform and one island platform serving three tracks, connected to the station building by a footbridge. The station has a Midori no Madoguchi staffed ticket office.

=== Platforms ===
1	■ Ōu Main Line	for Aomori
2	■ Ōu Main Line	for Hirosaki and Akita
3	■ Ōu Main Line	(siding)

Note: Track 3 is used primarily for freight trains changing direction.

== Route bus ==
- Aomori City Bus
  - For.Aomori Station via Ishie, Nishitaki and Furukawa
  - For.Namioka Station via Daishaka
  - For.Magonai via Tsurugasaka
  - For.Furukawa via Okamachi, Aburakawa and Okidate
  - For.Nogiwa-Danchi via Okachimachi and Aburakawa
- Kōnan Bus
  - For.Kuroishi via Namioka and Tobinai
  - For.Goshogawara via Daishaka and Harako
  - For.Yadame via Aomori Station and Shinmachi

== History ==
Tsugaru-Shinjō Station was opened on 1 December 1894 as Shinjō Station (新城駅, Shinjō-eki) on the Japanese Government Railway, the predecessor to the Japan National Railways (JNR). It took its present name on 11 September 1915. With the privatization of JNR on 1 April 1, 1987, it came under the operational control of JR East.

== Passenger statistics ==
In fiscal 2018, the station was used by an average of 365 passengers daily (boarding passengers only).

== Surrounding area ==
- Aomori city hall Shinjō office

== See also ==
- List of railway stations in Japan
