= Tarō Kimura (politician) =

Japanese politician (1965–2017)

- 木村 太郎
- Official portrait, 2012

Member of the House of Representatives
- In office 20 October 1996 – 25 July 2017
- Preceded by: Constituency established
- Succeeded by: Constituency abolished
- Constituency: Aomori 4th

Member of the Aomori Prefectural Assembly
- In office 1991–1996
- Constituency: Minamitsugaru District

Personal details
- Born: 20 July 1965 Fujisaki, Aomori, Japan
- Died: 25 July 2017 (aged 52) Tokyo, Japan
- Party: Liberal Democratic
- Relatives: Jiro Kimura (brother)
- Education: Toyo University

Tarō Kimura (木村 太郎, Kimura Tarō; 20 July 1965 − 25 July 2017) was a Japanese politician of the Liberal Democratic Party, a member of the House of Representatives in the Diet (national legislature).

== Early life ==
Kimura was a native of Fujisaki, Aomori and graduated from Toyo University.

== Political career ==
Kimura was elected to the House of Representatives for the first time in 1996 after serving in the Aomori Prefectural Assembly for two terms.

== Death ==
He died of cancer on 25 July 2017, at a hospital in Tokyo, aged 52.
