= Hayashizaki Station =

Railway station in Fujisaki, Aomori Prefecture, Japan

Hayashizaki Station 林崎駅
- Hayashizaki Station in July 2026

General information
- Location: Hayashizaki Hiraoka 35, Fujisaki-machi, Minamitsugaru-gun, Aomori-ken 038-3806; Japan
- Coordinates: 40°40′29.92″N 140°28′49.88″E
- Operator: JR East
- Line: ■ Gonō Line
- Distance: 141.9 km from Higashi-Noshiro
- Platforms: 1 side platform

Other information
- Status: Unstaffed
- Website: Official website (in Japanese)

History
- Opened: April 15, 1935

Services
Preceding station	JR East	Following station
Itayanagi towards Higashi-Noshiro	Gonō Line Rapid	Fujisaki One-way operation
Itayanagi towards Higashi-Noshiro	Gonō Line Local	Fujisaki towards Hirosaki
Location
- Location within Japan

Hayashizaki Station (林崎駅, Hayashizaki-eki) is a railway station located in the town of Fujisaki, Aomori Prefecture, Japan, operated by the East Japan Railway Company (JR East).

== Lines ==
Hayashizaki Station is a station on the Gonō Line, and is located 141.9 kilometers from the terminus of the line at Higashi-Noshiro.

== Station layout ==
Hayashizakii Station has one ground-level side platform serving a single bi-directional track. In 2007, the platform was lengthened to accommodate four-car trains, thus eliminating the need for a Selective door operation system. The station is unattended.

== History ==
Hayashizaki Station was opened on April 15, 1935, as a station on the Japan National Railways (JNR). With the privatization of the JNR on April 1, 1987, it came under the operational control of JR East.

== Surrounding area ==
- National Route 339

== See also ==
- List of railway stations in Japan
