= Kita-Tokiwa Station =

Railway station in Fujisaki, Aomori Prefecture, Japan

Kita-Tokiwa Station 北常盤駅
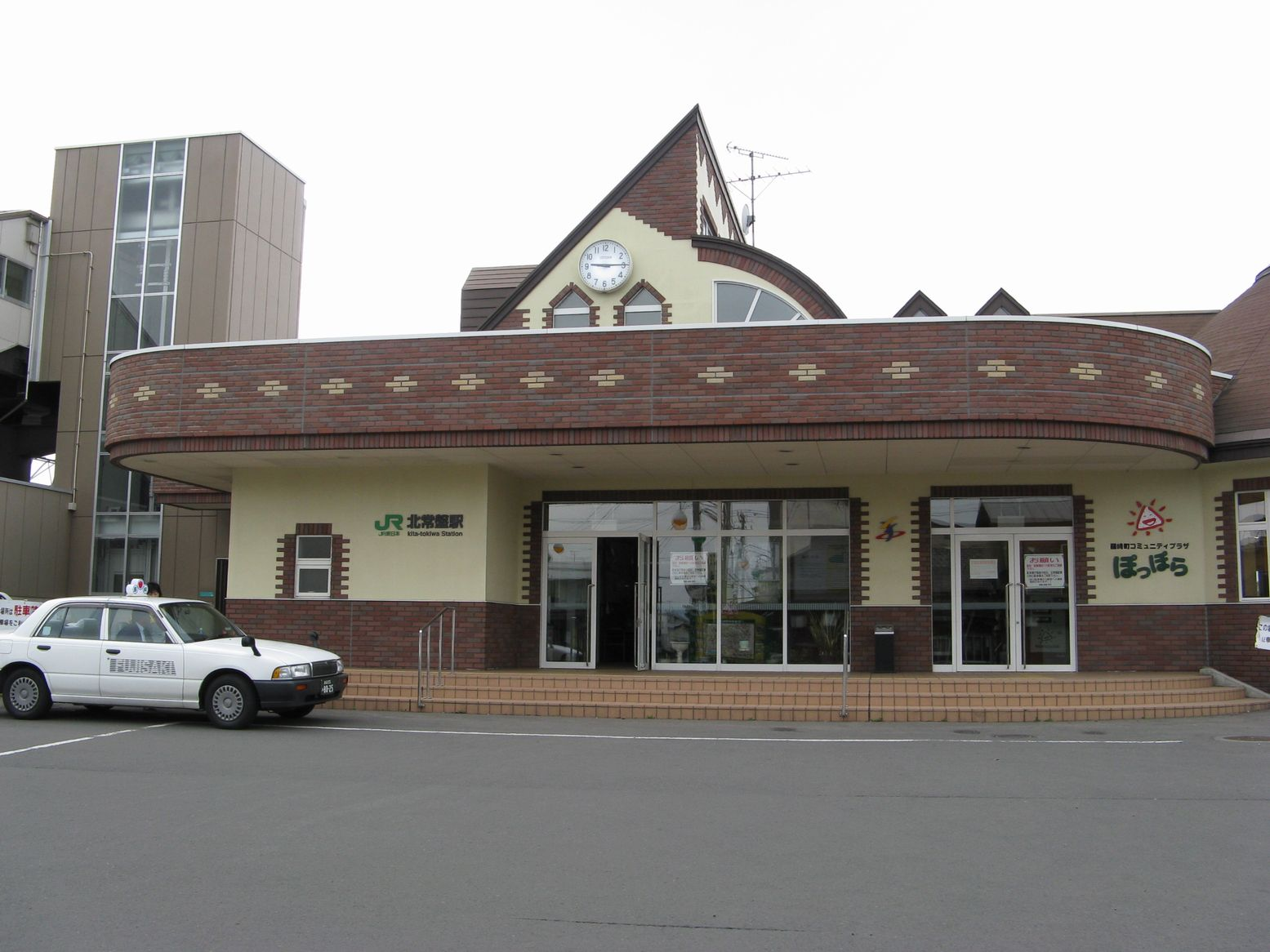
- Kita-Tokiwa Station in April 2008

General information
- Location: Tokiwa, Fujisaki-machi, Minamitsugaru-gun, Aomori-ken 038-1214; Japan
- Coordinates: 40°40′14.29″N 140°32′37.33″E
- Operator: JR East
- Line: ■ Ōu Main Line
- Distance: 456.6 km from Fukushima
- Platforms: 1 side + 1 island platform
- Tracks: 3

Other information
- Status: Staffed (Midori no Madoguchi )
- Website: Official website

History
- Opened: 20 December 1924

Passengers
- FY2018: 421 daily

Services
Preceding station	JR East	Following station
Kawabe towards Akita	Ōu Main Line Rapid	Namioka towards Aomori
Kawabe towards Shinjō	Ōu Main Line Local	Namioka towards Aomori
Location
- Location within Aomori Prefecture Location within Japan

Kita-Tokiwa Station (北常盤駅, Kita-Tokiwa-eki) is a railway station in the town of Fujisaki, Aomori Prefecture, Japan, operated by the East Japan Railway Company (JR East).

== Lines ==
Kita-Tokiwa Station is served by the Ōu Main Line, and is located 455.6 km from the southern terminus of the line at Fukushima.

== Station layout ==
The station has one side platform and one island platform serving three tracks, connected to the station building by a footbridge. The station has a Midori no Madoguchi staffed ticket office.

=== Platforms ===
1	■ Ōu Main Line	for Hirosaki and Akita
2	■ Ōu Main Line	for Namioka and Aomori
3	■ Ōu Main Line	(not normally used)

Track 3 is used primarily for freight trains changing direction.

== History ==
Kita-Tokiwa Station opened on 20 December 1924 as a station on the Japanese Government Railways (JGR), the pre-war predecessor to the Japanese National Railways (JNR). With the privatization of JNR on 1 April 1987, it came under the operational control of JR East.

== Passenger statistics ==
In fiscal 2018, the station was used by an average of 421 passengers daily (boarding passengers only).

== Station vicinity ==
- Aomori Shinkin Bank Tokiwa branch
- Mutsu Tokiwa Post Office (delivery and collection office)
- Tokiwa Taxi
- Hirosaki Police District Fujisaki Koban
- Fujisaki Municipal Meitoku Junior High School

== See also ==
- List of railway stations in Japan
