= Itayanagi Station =

Railway station in Itayanagi, Aomori Prefecture, Japan

Itayanagi Station 板柳駅
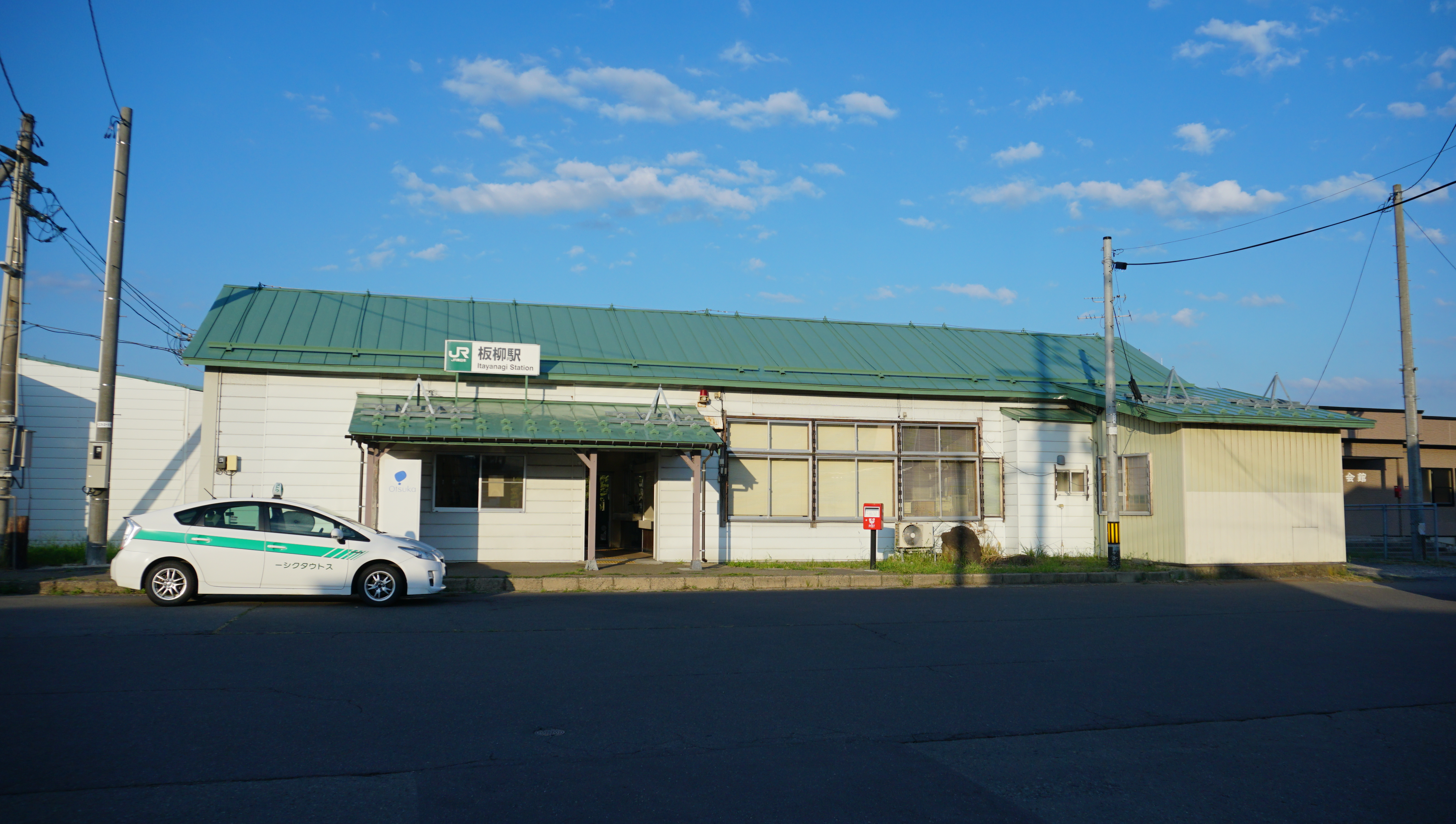
- Itayanagi Station in September 2019

General information
- Location: Fukunoda Minoruta 48, Itayanagi-cho, Minamitsugaru-gun, Aomori-ken 038-3661; Japan
- Coordinates: 40°41′50.89″N 140°27′41.68″E
- Operator: JR East
- Line: ■ Gonō Line
- Distance: 138.9 kilometers from Higashi-Noshiro
- Platforms: 1 island platform

Other information
- Status: Staffed (Midori no Madoguchi )
- Website: www.jreast.co.jp/estation/station/info.aspx?StationCd=134

History
- Opened: September 25, 1918

Passengers
- FY2016: 351

Services
Preceding station	JR East	Following station
Tsurudomari towards Higashi-Noshiro	Gonō Line Rapid	Hayashizaki One-way operation
Tsurudomari towards Higashi-Noshiro	Gonō Line Local	Hayashizaki towards Hirosaki
Location
- Location within Japan

Itayanagi Station (板柳駅, Itayanagi-eki) is a railway station located in the town of Itayanagi, Aomori Prefecture, Japan, operated by the East Japan Railway Company (JR East).

== Lines ==
Itayanagi Station is served by the Gonō Line. It is 138.9 rail kilometers from the terminus of the line at Higashi-Noshiro.

== Station layout ==
Itayanagi Station has a single ground-level island platform, connected to the station building by a footbridge. The station has a Midori no Madoguchi staffed ticket office.

=== Platforms ===
1	■ Gonō Line	For Goshogawara, Ajigasawa and Fukaura
2	■ Gonō Line	For Kawabe, Hirosaki and Aomori

== History ==
Itayanagi Station was opened on September 25, 1918 as a station on the Mutsu Railway. It became a station on the Japanese Government Railways (JGR) when the Mutsu Railway was nationalized on June 1, 1927. With the privatization of the Japanese National Railways (successor to JGR) on April 1, 1987, it came under the operational control of JR East.

== Passenger statistics ==
In fiscal 2016, the station was used by an average of 351 passengers daily (boarding passengers only).

== Surrounding area ==
- National Route 339
- Itayanagi town hall
- Itayanagi Post Office
- Itayanagi onsen

== See also ==
- List of railway stations in Japan
