= Fujisaki Station =

Fujisaki Station (藤崎駅) is the name of two train stations in Japan:

- Fujisaki Station (Aomori)
- Fujisaki Station (Fukuoka)
