= Tsuruta, Aomori =

Tsuruta 鶴田町
- Town
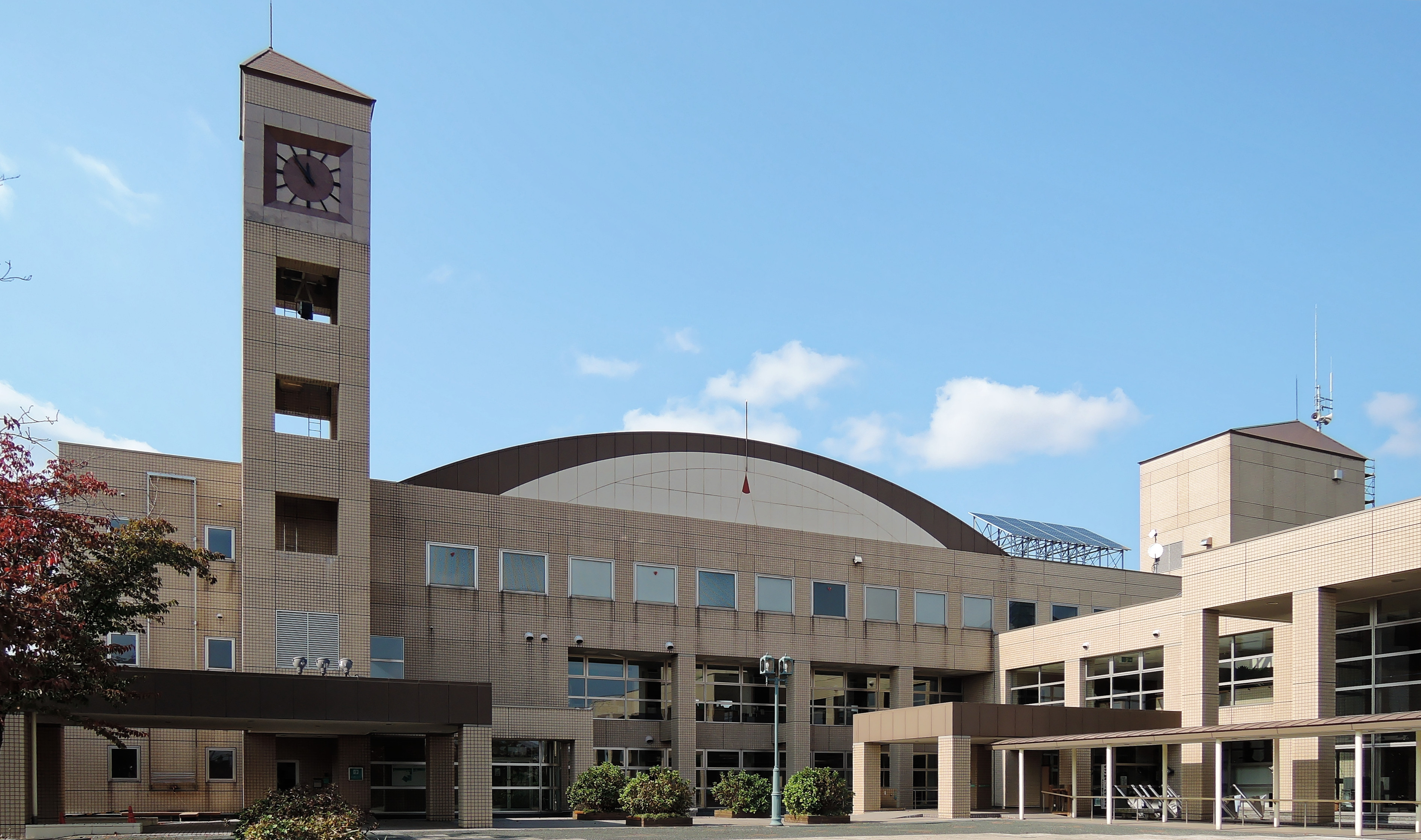
- Tsuruta town hall

- Flag Seal
- Location of Tsuruta in Aomori Prefecture

- Coordinates: 40°45′31.7″N 140°25′42.7″E
- Country: Japan
- Region: Tōhoku
- Prefecture: Aomori
- District: Kitatsugaru

Area
  - Total: 46.43 km^{2} (17.93 sq mi)

Population (January 31, 2023)
  - Total: 11,968
  - Density: 257.8/km^{2} (667.6/sq mi)
- Time zone: UTC+9 (Japan Standard Time)
- Phone number: 0173-74-2111
- Address: 200-1 Hayase, Tsuruta-machi, Kitatsugaru-gun, Aomori-ken 038-3503
- Website: Official website
- Symbols
- Bird: Red-crowned crane
- Flower: Apple
- Tree: Japanese black pine

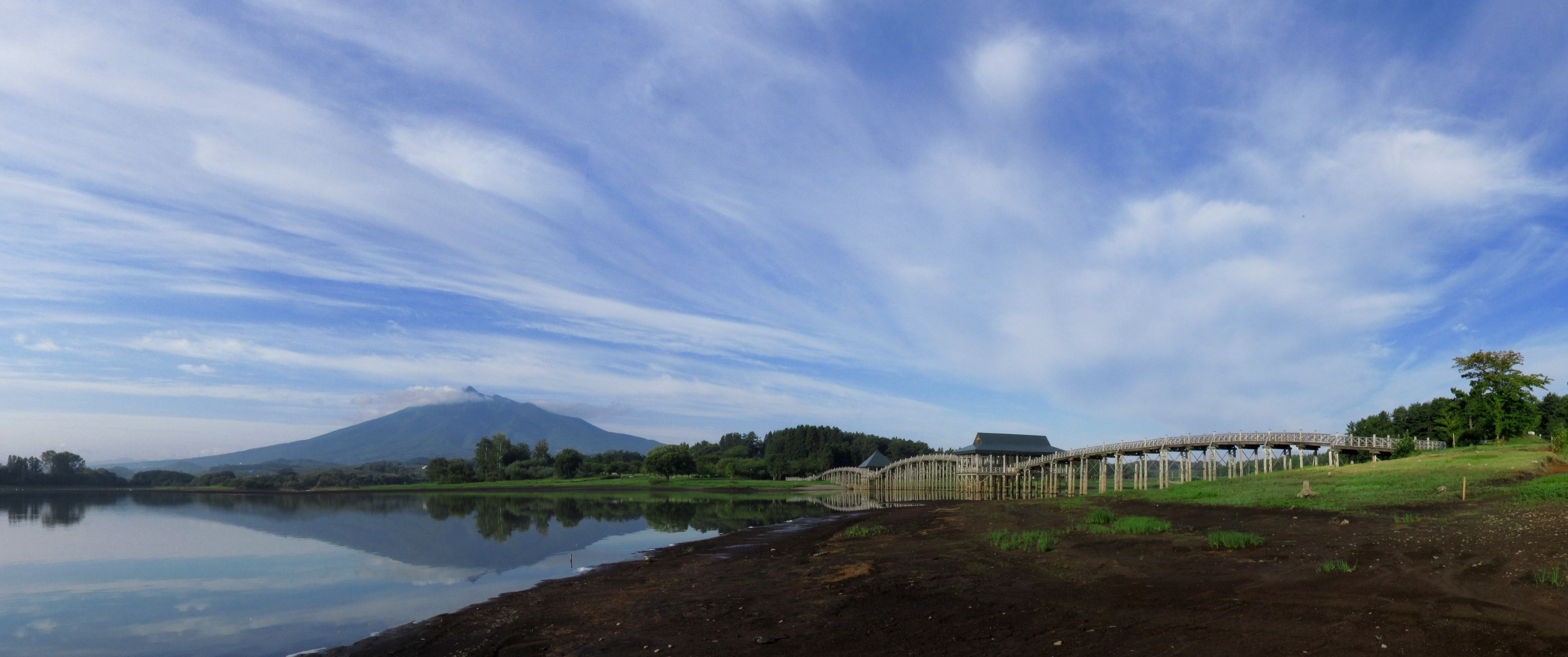
Tsurunomaihashi and Fujimiko Park

Tsuruta (鶴田町, Tsuruta-machi) is a town located in Aomori Prefecture, Japan. As of 31 January 2023, the town had an estimated population of 11,968 in 5355 households, and a population density of 260 persons per km^{2}. The total area of the town is 46.4 square kilometres (17.9 sq mi). The name "Tsuruta" is a combination of the character for crane (鶴) with that for rice field (田).

== Geography ==
Tsuruta is located at the base of Tsugaru Peninsula in Kitatsugaru District of Aomori Prefecture. The Iwaki River flows through the town. Tsuruta Town Office, approximately in the center of town, is 25 kilometers from the Sea of Japan and about 45 kilometers from Aomori City, the capital of Aomori Prefecture.

=== Neighbouring municipalities ===
Aomori Prefecture

- Goshogawara
- Hirosaki
- Itayanagi
- Tsugaru

=== Climate ===
Tsuruta has a cold humid continental climate (Köppen Dfb) characterized by warm short summers and long cold winters with heavy snowfall. The average annual temperature in Tsuruta is 10.6 °C. The average annual rainfall is 1296 mm with September as the wettest month. The temperatures are highest on average in August, at around 23.9 °C, and lowest in January, at around -1.6 °C.

== Demographics ==
Per Japanese census data, the population of Tsuruta has declined over the past 60 years.

Historical population
Year	Pop.	±% p.a.
1960	19,774	—
1970	17,620	−1.15%
1980	16,892	−0.42%
1990	16,306	−0.35%
2000	15,795	−0.32%
2010	14,270	−1.01%
2020	12,074	−1.66%

== History ==
The area around Tsuruta was controlled by the Tsugaru clan of Hirosaki Domain during the Edo period. After the Meiji Restoration, it was formed into a village on April 1, 1889 with the establishment of the modern municipalities system. It was elevated to town status on October 1, 1941. On March 1, 1955, it annexed the neighboring villages of Umezawa, Rokugo, and Mizumoto, and on November 1, 1958 it also annexed a portion of Itayanagi.

== Government ==
Tsuruta has a mayor-council form of government with a directly elected mayor and a unicameral town legislature of 12 members. Kitatsugaru District, less the town of Nakadomari, contributes one member to the Aomori Prefectural Assembly. In terms of national politics, the town is part of Aomori 3rd district of the lower house of the Diet of Japan.

== Economy ==
The economy of Tsuruta is heavily dependent on horticulture, especially for apples. Cold-hardy varieties of rice and many varieties of apples are grown in the town. Farmers in the area have developed a strain of apples that does not oxidize (turn brown) when cut.

== Education ==
Tsuruta has one public elementary school and one public junior high school operated by the town government, and one private high school, which opened in 2023 on the campus of the old public high school.

Tsuruta's school system is part of a new government pilot program in Japan. Schools participating in the program pick an area of focus and develop specialized curricula that expose young kids to the specialty at an early age. Tsuruta's school system focuses on teaching English starting in preschool. To implement this program in elementary schools, Tsuruta employs CIRs, one from the JET Programme and one from Hood River, Oregon. In addition, ALTs are also employed at both the middle school and the high school. The Tsuruta-Hood River sister city relationship is among the most active in Japan, with groups of students and/or adults making a pilgrimage between the two towns several times a year.

== Transportation ==
=== Railway ===
East Japan Railway Company (JR East) - Gonō Line

- Mutsu-Tsuruda - Tsurudomari

=== Highway ===
National Route 339

== Sister cities ==
- Hood River, Oregon, United States of America, since 1977

== Local attractions ==
- Tsurunomai Bridge: Tsuruta is famous for its wooden footbridge, which is 300 meters in length. It is said that anyone who walks across the bridge will have a long life. The bridge passes over Tsugaru Fujimi Lake in Fujimiko Park, where the town hosts a cherry blossom festival that falls sometime around Japan's Golden Week, May 3–5.
- The town is also host to a summer festival, Tsuruta Matsuri, when floats (nebuta ねぶた) parade through the central streets. This is a time when Tsuruta's townfolk take to the streets to make what is claimed to be Japan's longest sushi roll.
- The town's central park, Fujimi Lake Park (富士見湖パーク), has views of the nearby volcano, Mount Iwaki, and has a stage where various events take place in the summer months. The lake, whose name means "Fuji view", is so called because Mount Iwaki has been called Mount Fuji of Tsugaru. The park also houses a number of red-crowned cranes.
