= Itayanagi, Aomori =

Itayanagi 板柳町
- Town
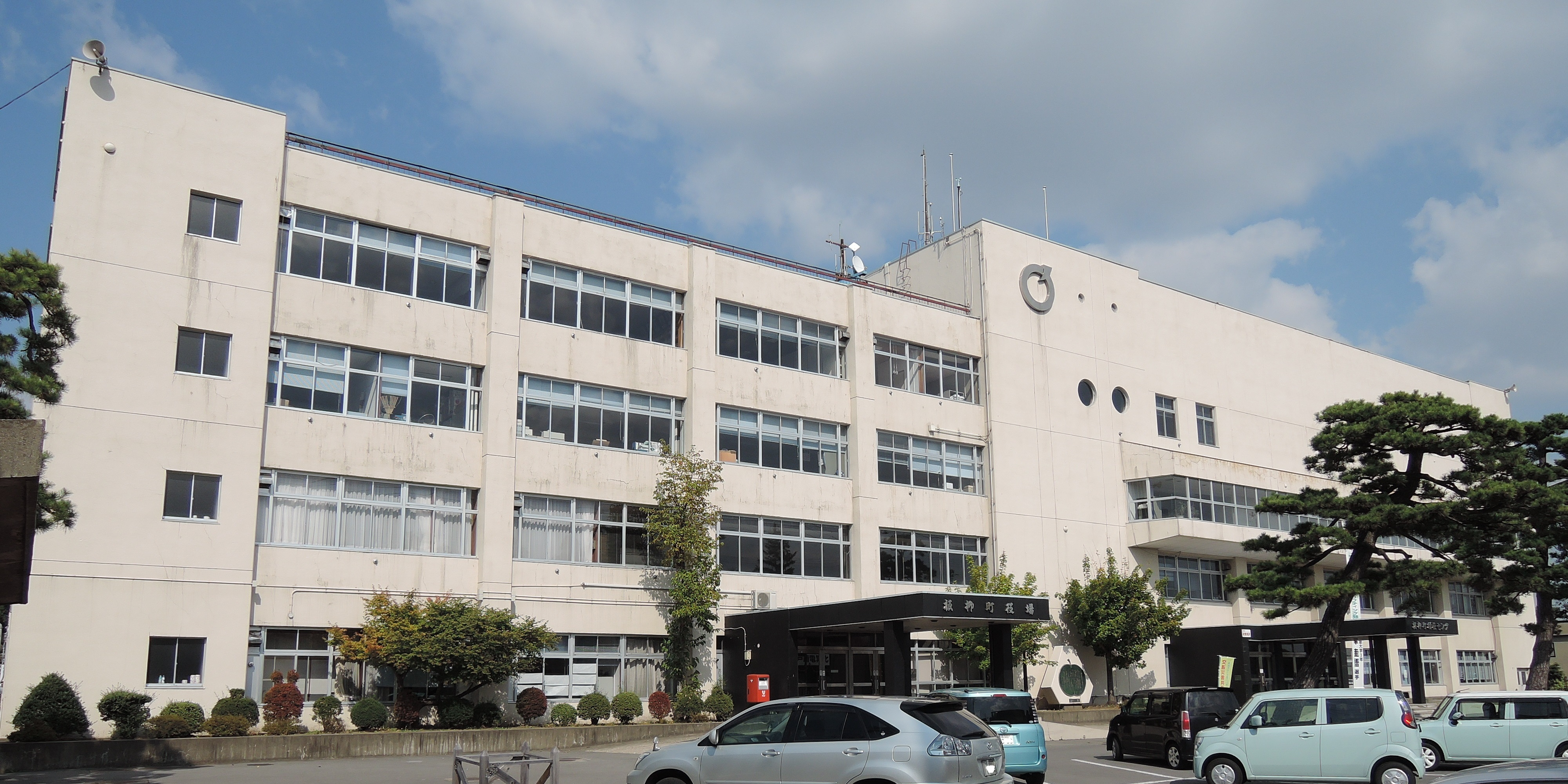
- Itayanagi town hall

- Flag Seal
- Interactive map of Itayanagi
- Coordinates: 40°41′45.2″N 140°27′26.1″E
- Country: Japan
- Region: Tōhoku
- Prefecture: Aomori
- District: Kitatsugaru

Area
  - Total: 41.88 km^{2} (16.17 sq mi)

Population (February 1, 2023)
  - Total: 12,686
  - Density: 302.9/km^{2} (784.5/sq mi)
- Time zone: UTC+9 (Japan Standard Time)
- Phone number: 0172-73-2111
- Address: 239-3 Doi, Itayanagi-machi, Kitatsugaru-gun, Aomori-ken 038-3692
- Website: Official website
- Symbols
- Flower: Platycodon grandiflorus
- Tree: Maple

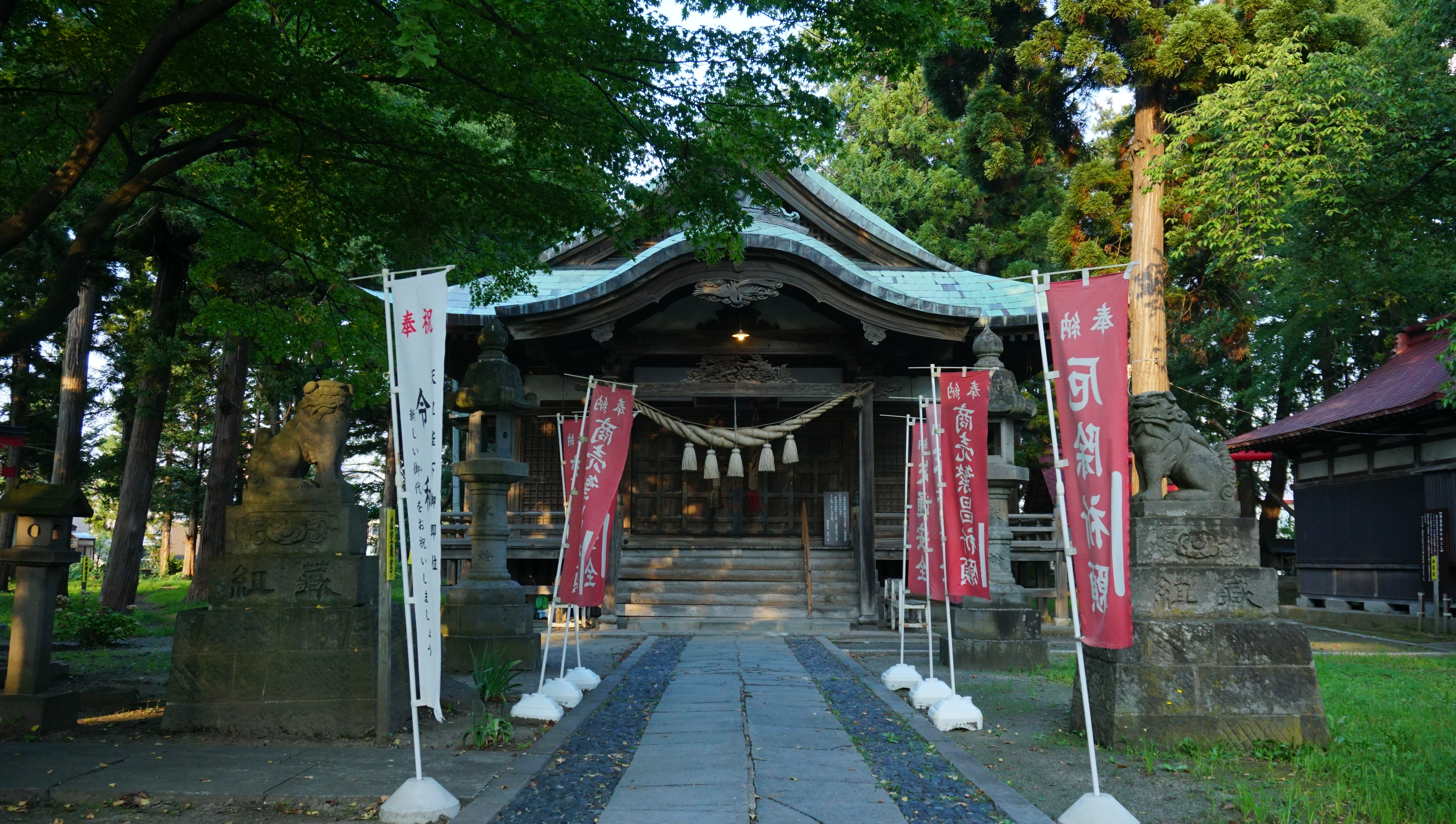
KaidoJinja founded by Tsugaru Tamenobu

Itayanagi (板柳町, Itayanagi-machi) is a town located in Aomori Prefecture, Japan. As of 1 April 2020, the town had an estimated population of 13,332 in 5450 households, and a population density of 300 persons per km^{2}. The total area of the town is 41.88 square kilometres (16.17 sq mi).

== Geography ==
Itayanagi is located at the base of Tsugaru Peninsula in Kitatsugaru District of Aomori Prefecture. The Iwaki River flows through the town.

=== Neighbouring municipalities ===
Aomori Prefecture

- Aomori
- Fujisaki
- Goshogawara
- Hirosaki
- Tsuruta

=== Climate ===
The town has a cold humid continental climate (Köppen Dfb) characterized by warm short summers and long cold winters with heavy snowfall. The average annual temperature in Itayanagi is 10.6 °C. The average annual rainfall is 1290 mm with September as the wettest month. The temperatures are highest on average in August, at around 24.1 °C, and lowest in January, at around -1.7 °C.

== Demographics ==
Per Japanese census data, the population of Itayanagi has decreased steadily over the past 60 years.

Historical population
Year	Pop.	±% p.a.
1960	21,860	—
1970	19,901	−0.93%
1980	19,215	−0.35%
1990	17,766	−0.78%
2000	16,840	−0.53%
2010	15,227	−1.00%
2020	12,700	−1.80%

== History ==
The area around Itayanagi was controlled by the Tsugaru clan of Hirosaki Domain during the Edo period, and was the location of a daikansho. After the Meiji Restoration, it was formed into a village on April 1, 1889, with the establishment of the modern municipalities system. It was elevated to town status on April 1, 1920. On March 10, 1955, Itayanagi annexed the neighboring villages of Hataoka, Koami, and Arakawa.

== Government ==
Itayanagi has a mayor-council form of government with a directly elected mayor and a unicameral town legislature of 12 members. Kitatsugaru District, less the town of Nakadomari, contributes one member to the Aomori Prefectural Assembly. In terms of national politics, the town is part of Aomori 3rd district of the lower house of the Diet of Japan.

== Economy ==
The economy of Itayanagi is heavily dependent on horticulture, especially for apples, with rice as a secondary crop.

== Education ==
Itayanagi has four public elementary schools and one public junior high school operated by the town government, and one public high school operated by the Aomori Prefectural Board of Education.

== Transportation ==
=== Railway ===
East Japan Railway Company (JR East) - Gonō Line

- Itayanagi

=== Highway ===
National Route 339

== International relations ==
- Yakima, Washington, United States of America
- Changping District, Beijing, China

== Notable people ==
- Kayoko Fukushi, track and field athlete
- Hayateumi Hidehito, sumo wrestler
- Chū Kudō, Manchukuo politician
- Mami Matsuyama, pop idol singer
- Norio Nagayama, mass murder and novelist
- Takamisakari Seiken, sumo wrestler
