= Namioka Station =

Railway station in Aomori, Aomori Prefecture, Japan

Namioka Station 浪岡駅
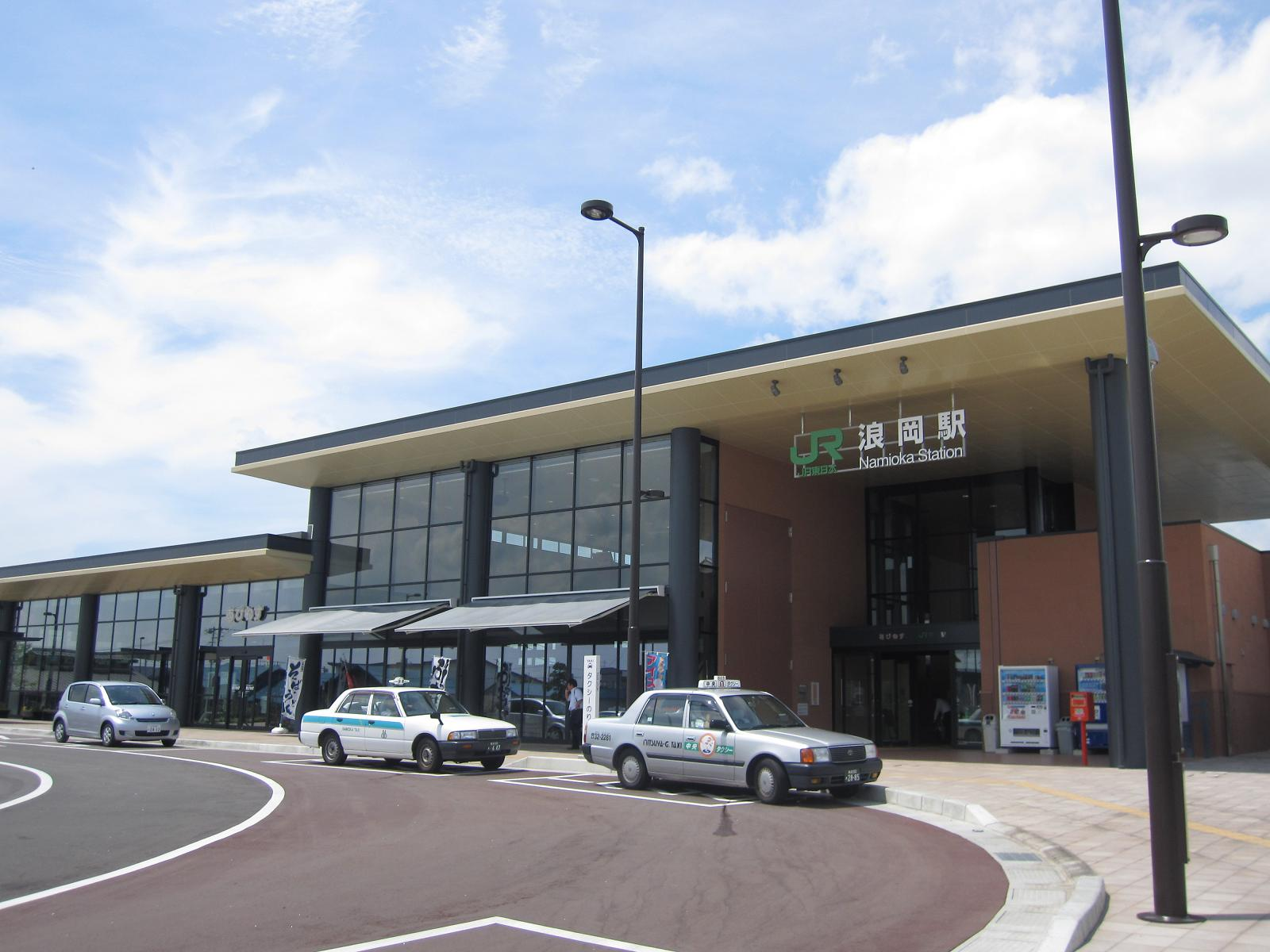
- Namioka Station in July 2010

General information
- Location: 61 Hosoda, Namioka, Aomori-shi, Aomori-ken 038-1311; Japan
- Coordinates: 40°42′38.11″N 140°34′52.22″E
- Operator: JR East
- Line: ■ Ōu Main Line
- Distance: 462.1 km from Fukushima
- Platforms: 1 side + 1 island platforms

Other information
- Status: Staffed
- Website: Official website

History
- Opened: 7 December 1894

Passengers
- FY2018: 942 daily

Services
Preceding station	JR East	Following station
Kita-Tokiwa towards Akita	Ōu Main Line Rapid	Tsugaru-Shinjō towards Aomori
Kita-Tokiwa towards Shinjō	Ōu Main Line Local	Daishaka towards Aomori
Location
- Location within Aomori Prefecture Location within Japan

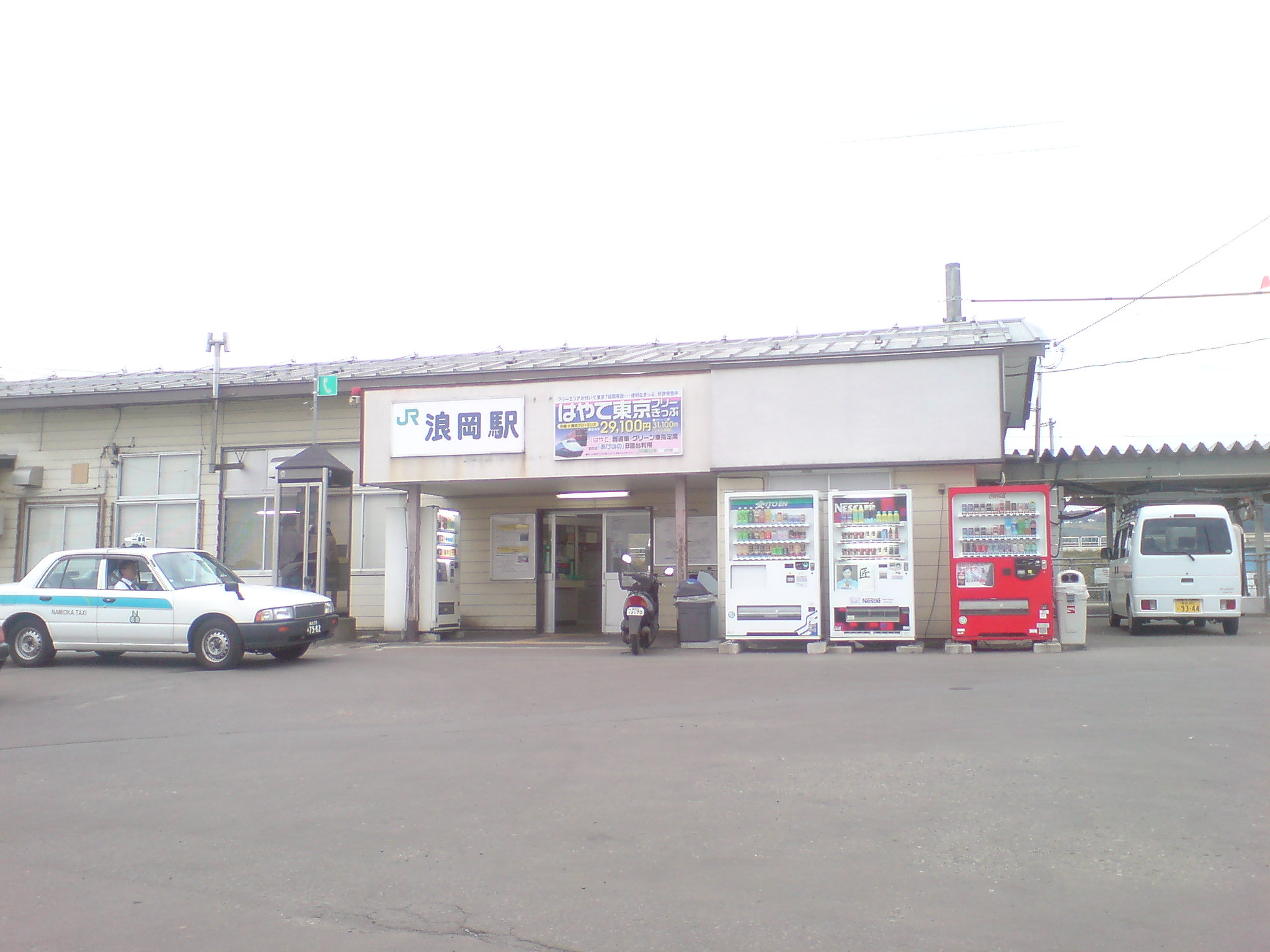
The old Namioka Station

Namioka Station (浪岡駅, Namioka-eki) is a railway station located in the city of Aomori, Aomori Prefecture, Japan, operated by the East Japan Railway Company (JR East).

== Lines ==
Namioka Station is served by the Ōu Main Line, and is located 462.1 kilometres (287.1 mi) from the southern terminus of the line at Fukushima.

== Station layout ==
The station has one side platform and one island platform serving three tracks, connected to the station building by a footbridge. The station has a reserved seat ticket vending machine.

=== Platforms ===
1	■ Ōu Main Line	for Kawabe and Hirosaki
2	■ Ōu Main Line	for Tsugaru-Shinjō and Aomori
3	■ Ōu Main Line	(siding)

== Route bus ==
- Aomori municipal Bus
  - For Aomori Station via Daishaka and Shinjō
  - For Aomori Station via Aomori Airport
- Konan Bus
  - For Kuroishi Station via Hongō
  - For Kuroishi Station via Tobinai and Mayajiri

== History ==
Namioka Station was opened on 7 December 1894 as a station on the Japanese Government Railway, the predecessor to the Japanese National Railways (JNR) in former Namioka village. With the privatization of the JNR on 1 April 1987, it came under the operational control of JR East. A new station building was completed in November 2009.

== Passenger statistics ==
In fiscal 2018, the station was used by an average of 942 passengers daily (boarding passengers only).

== Surrounding area ==
- Namioka post office
- National Route 7
- Aomori city hall Namioka office
- Namioka onsen

== See also ==
- List of railway stations in Japan
