= Fujisaki Station (Aomori) =

Railway station in Fujisaki, Aomori Prefecture, Japan

Fujisaki Station 藤崎駅
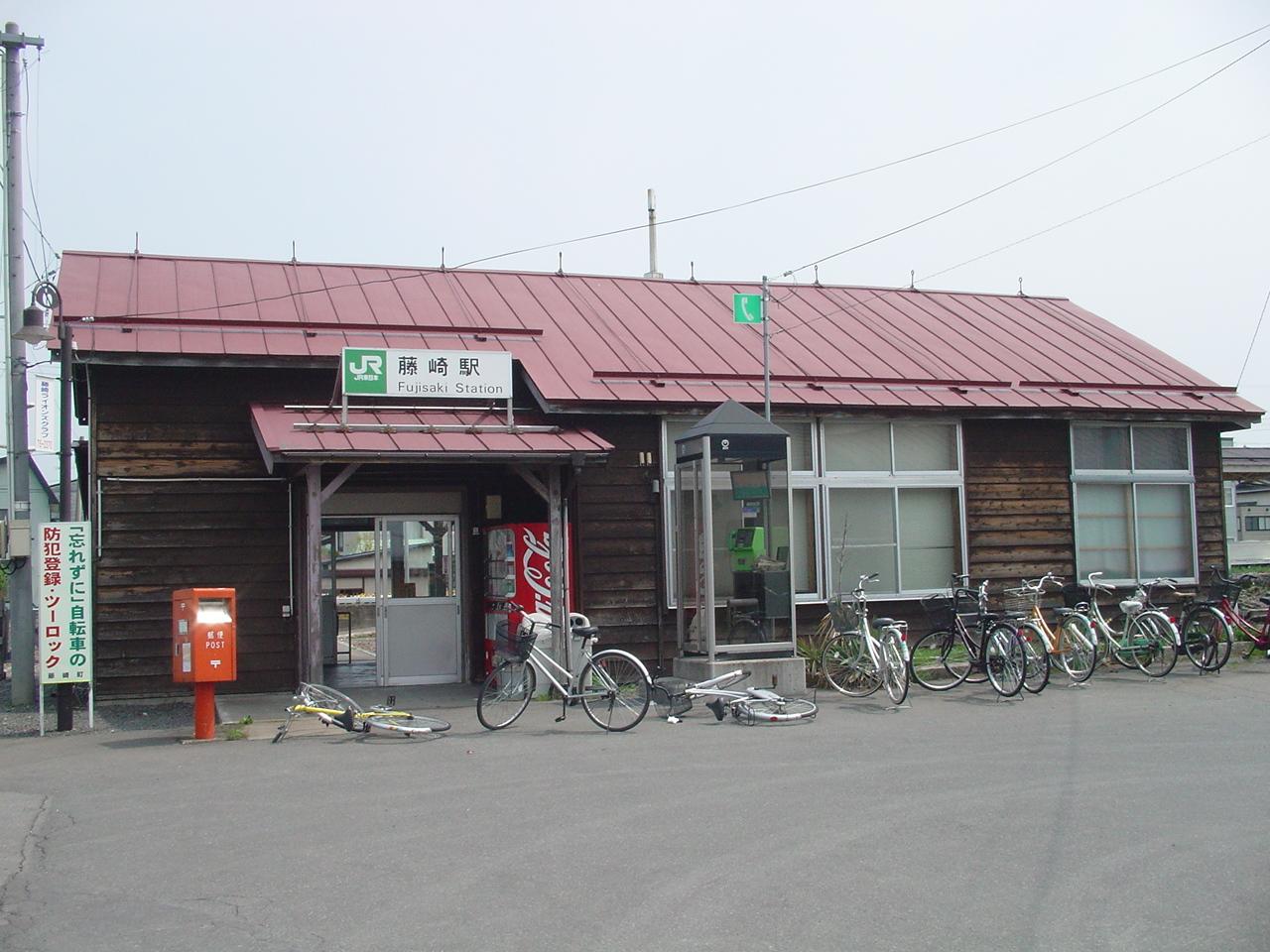
- Fujisaki Station in May 2007

General information
- Location: Nishimurai 60, Fujisaki-machi,[Minamitsugaru-gun, Aomori-ken 038-3802; Japan
- Coordinates: 40°39′14.64″N 140°29′58.68″E
- Operator: JR East
- Line: ■ Gonō Line
- Distance: 144.7 km from Higashi-Noshiro
- Platforms: 1 side platform

Other information
- Status: Unstaffed
- Website: Official website (in Japanese)

History
- Opened: September 25, 1918

Services
| Preceding station | JR East | Following station |
|---|---|---|
| Hayashizaki towards Higashi-Noshiro | Gonō Line Rapid | Kawabe One-way operation |
| Hayashizaki towards Higashi-Noshiro | Gonō Line Local | Kawabe towards Hirosaki |
Location
- Location within Japan

Fujisaki Station (藤崎駅, Fujisaki-eki) is a railway station located in the town of Fujisaki, Aomori Prefecture, Japan, operated by the East Japan Railway Company (JR East).

== Lines ==
Fujisaki Station is a station on the Gonō Line, and is located 144.7 kilometers from the terminus of the line at Higashi-Noshiro.

== Station layout ==
Fujisaki Station has one ground-level island platform, but only a single track is in use, serving bidirectional traffic. The station is unattended.

== History ==
Fujisaki Station was opened on September 25, 1918 as a station on the Mutsu Railway. It became a station on the Japan National Railways (JNR) when the Mutsu Railway was nationalized on June 1, 1927. With the privatization of the JNR on April 1, 1987, it came under the operational control of JR East. The station has been unattended since 2001.

== Surrounding area ==
- National Route 339
- Fujisaki town hall
- Fujisaki Post Office

== See also ==
- List of railway stations in Japan
