= Fujisaki (surname) =

Fujisaki (written: 藤崎 or 藤嵜) is a Japanese surname. Notable people with the surname include:

- Ichirō Fujisaki (藤崎 一郎, born 1947), Japanese diplomat
- Ryu Fujisaki (藤崎 竜, born 1971), Japanese manga artist
- Satoshi Fujisaki, Japanese mixed martial artist
- Shota Fujisaki (藤﨑 将汰, born 1994), Japanese footballer
- Tomoki Fujisaki (藤嵜 智貴, born 1994), Japanese footballer
- Yoshitaka Fujisaki (藤崎 義孝, born 1975), Japanese footballer

== Fictional characters ==
- Chihiro Fujisaki (不二咲 千尋), a character in the visual novel Danganronpa
- Nadeshiko Fujisaki (藤咲 なでしこ), a character in the manga series Shugo Chara!
- Shiori Fujisaki (藤崎 詩織), a character in the visual novel Tokimeki Memorial
- Yusuke Fujisaki (藤崎 佑助), protagonist of the manga series Sket Dance
