= Fujisaki, Aomori =

Fujisaki 藤崎町
- Town
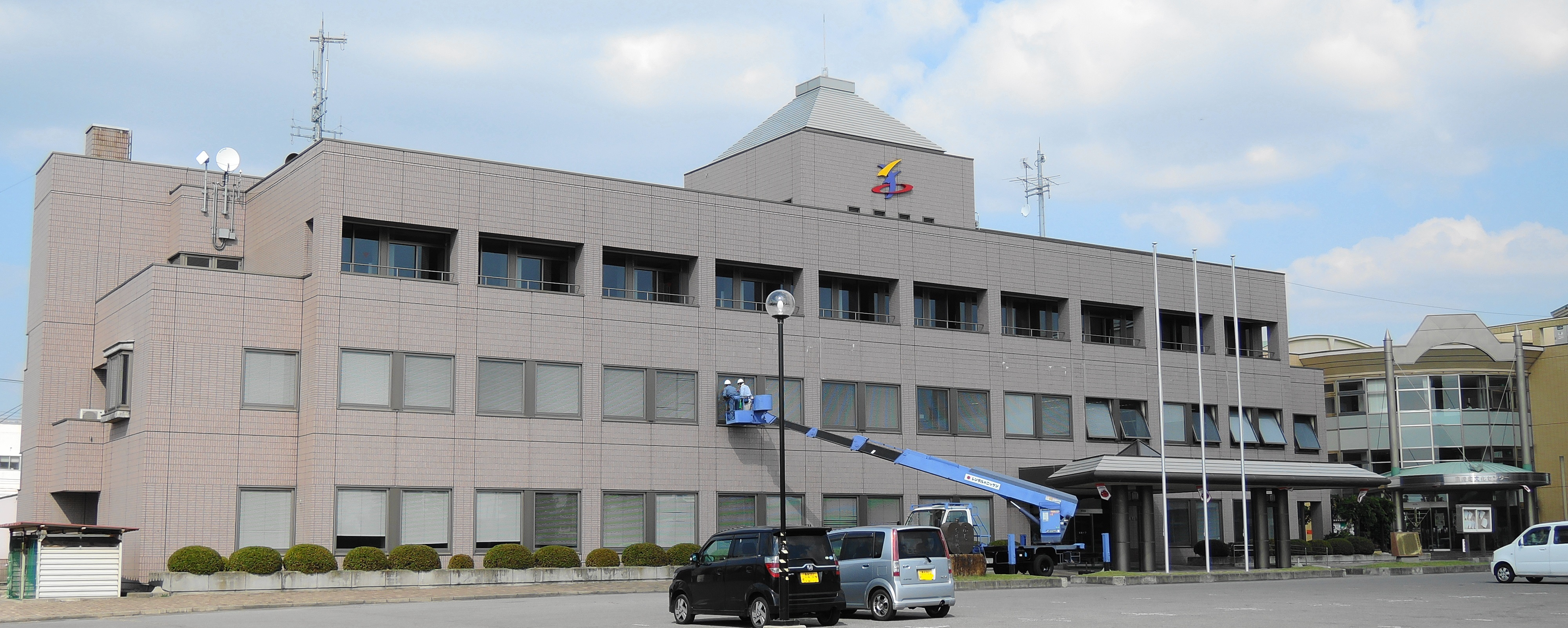
- Fujisaki Town Hall

- Flag Seal
- Interactive map of Fujisaki
- Coordinates: 40°39′21.8″N 140°30′10.1″E
- Country: Japan
- Region: Tōhoku
- Prefecture: Aomori
- District: Minamitsugaru

Area
  - Total: 37.29 km^{2} (14.40 sq mi)

Population (January 31, 2023)
  - Total: 14,558
  - Density: 390.4/km^{2} (1,011/sq mi)
- Time zone: UTC+9 (Japan Standard Time)
- Phone number: 0172-75-3111
- Address: 1-1 Toyota-chō, Fujisaki-machi, Minamitsugaru-gun, Aomori-ken 038-3892
- Website: Official website
- Symbols
- Bird: Swan
- Flower: Wisteria
- Tree: Apple

Fujisaki (藤崎町, Fujisaki-machi) is a town in Aomori Prefecture, Japan. As of 31 January 2023, the town had an estimated population of 14,558 in 6162 households, and a population density of 390 persons per km². The total area of the town is 37.29 square kilometers (14.40 sq mi).

== Geography ==
Fujisaki occupies the flatlands within Minamitsugaru District of south-central Aomori.

=== Neighboring municipalities ===
- Aomori
- Hirosaki
- Inakadate
- Itayanagi
- Kuroishi

=== Climate ===
The town has a cold humid continental climate (Köppen Dfb) characterized by warm short summers and long cold winters with heavy snowfall. The average annual temperature in Fujisaki is 10.6 °C. The average annual rainfall is 1288 mm with September as the wettest month. The temperatures are highest on average in August, at around 24.0 °C, and lowest in January, at around -1.8 °C.

== Demographics ==
Per Japanese census data, the population of Fujisaki has steadily decreased over the past 60 years.

Historical population
Year	Pop.	±% p.a.
1960	20,609	—
1970	18,355	−1.15%
1980	17,787	−0.31%
1990	17,139	−0.37%
2000	16,858	−0.17%
2010	16,021	−0.51%
2020	14,573	−0.94%

== History ==
During the Edo period, the area around Fujisaki was controlled by the Tsugaru clan of Hirosaki Domain. With the Meiji period establishment of the modern municipalities system on April 1, 1889 Fujisaki was chartered as a village within Minamitsugaru District, Aomori. On May 20, 1923, Fujisaki attained town status. On February 1, 1955, Fujisaki merged with neighboring Junisato Village. It annexed a portion of Itayanagi Village on August 10, 1956. On March 25, 2005, it merged with the neighboring town of Tokiwa. On September 1, 2007, a portion of the Namioka part of Aomori City merged into Fujisaki.

== Government ==
Fujisaki has a mayor-council form of government with a directly elected mayor and a unicameral town legislature of 14 members. Minamitsugaru District (with the exception of the town of Ōwani contributes one member to the Aomori Prefectural Assembly. In terms of national politics, the city is part of Aomori 3rd district of the lower house of the Diet of Japan.

== Economy ==
The economy of Fujisaki is heavily dependent on agriculture, notably rice and horticulture. The Fuji apple was developed here.

== Education ==
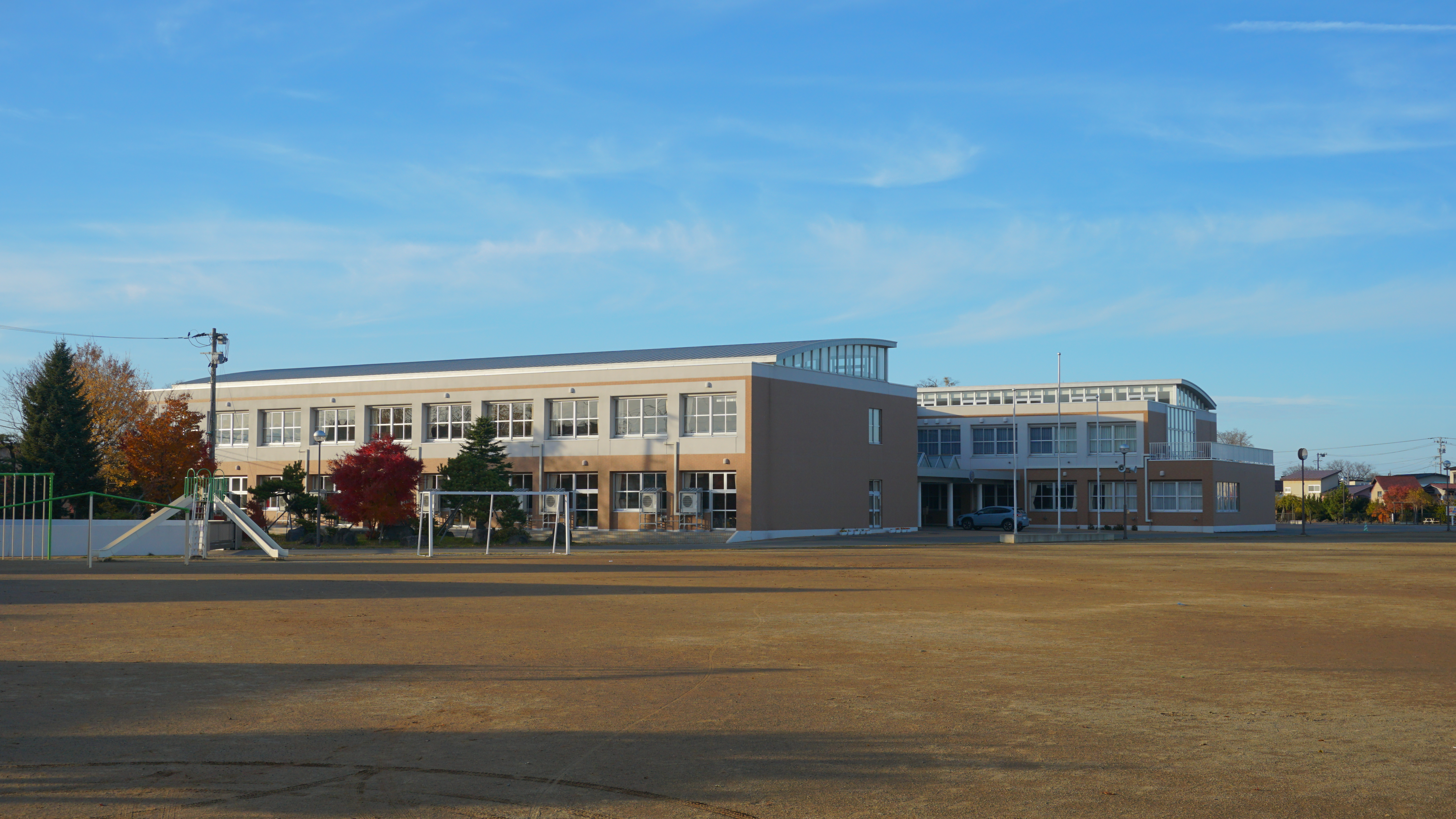
Fujisaki Elementary School

Fujisaki has three public elementary schools and two public junior high schools operated by the town government. The town does not have a high school.

== Transportation ==
=== Railway ===
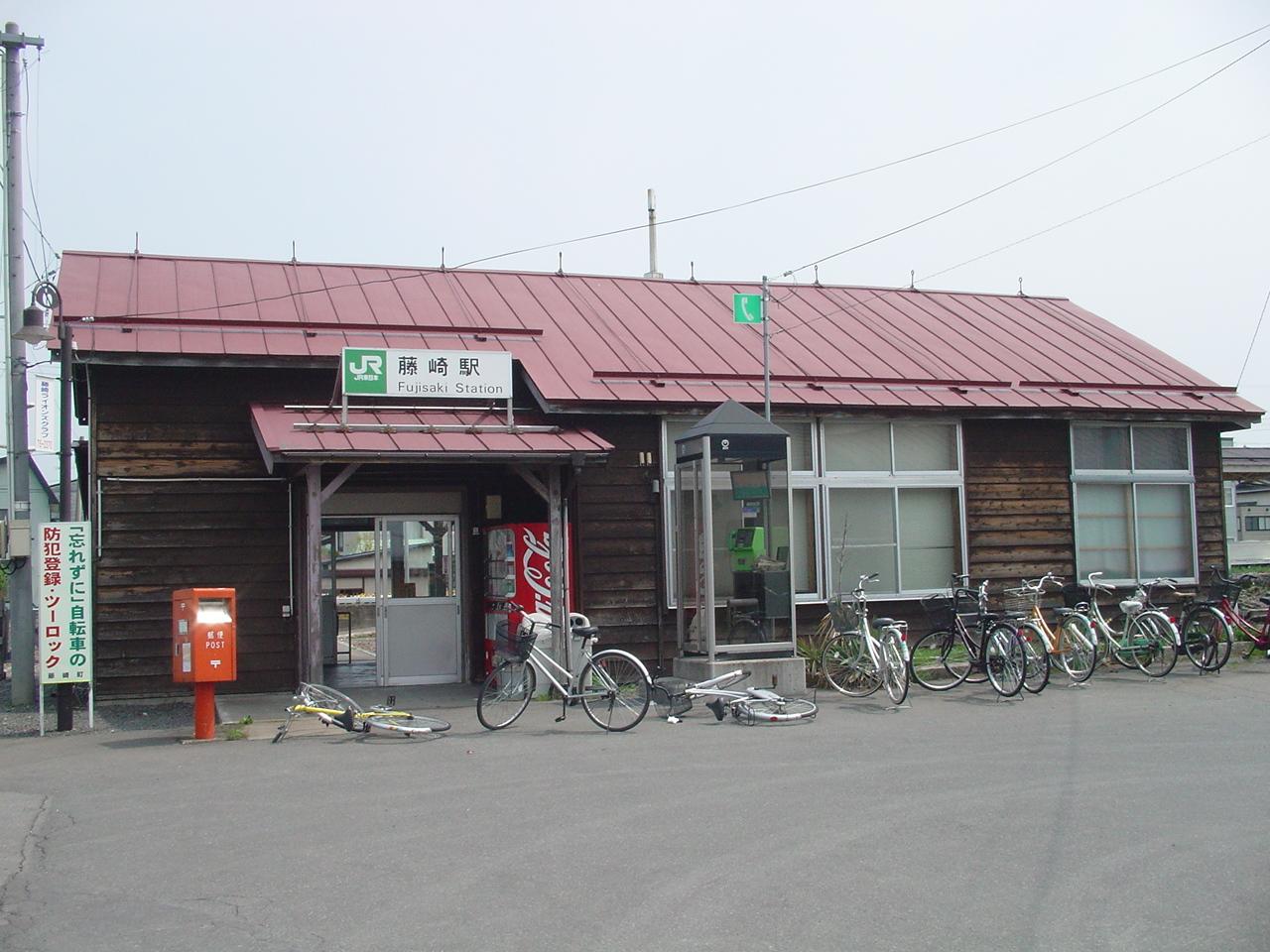
Gono Fujisaki Station

East Japan Railway Company (JR East) - Ōu Main Line

- Kita-Tokiwa

East Japan Railway Company (JR East) - Gonō Line

- Fujisaki - Hayashizaki

=== Highway ===
National Route 7
National Route 339

== Notable people from Fujisaki ==
- Taro Kimura, politician (1965-2017)
- Ōnosato Mansuke, professional sumo wrestler (1892-1938)

== Mascots ==

Fujisaki has two mascots, Fujimaru-kun and Jumbou-kun.

- Fujimaru-kun (ふじ丸くん) is a winged apple. He is most likely a Fuji apple. Despite his wings, he cannot fly.
- Jumbou-kun (ジャン坊くん) is a rice ball. His dream is to become mayor of Fujisaki. There are snacks of the same name produced in Fujisaki which feature Jumbou-kun's face.
