= Nakasato, Aomori =

Nakasato 中里町
- Former municipality
- Flag Seal

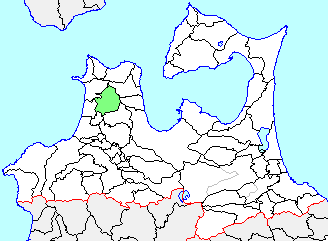
- Location of Nakasato in Aomori Prefecture

- Location in Japan
- Coordinates: 40°57′53.7″N 140°26′23.9″E
- Country: Japan
- Region: Tōhoku
- Prefecture: Aomori Prefecture
- District: Kitatsugaru
- Merged: March 28, 2005 (now part of Nakadomari)

Area
  - Total: 151.63 km^{2} (58.54 sq mi)

Population (March 1, 2005)
  - Total: 10,384
  - Density: 68.48/km^{2} (177.4/sq mi)
- Time zone: UTC+09:00 (JST)
- Symbols
- Bird: Japanese bush-warbler
- Flower: Chrysanthemum
- Tree: Ume

Nakasato (中里町, Nakasato-machi) was a town located in Kitatsugaru District in western Aomori Prefecture, Japan.

Nakasato Town was located in the center of Tsugaru Peninsula. The area was part of Hirosaki Domain during the Edo period. After the Meiji Restoration, Nakasato Village was created on April 1, 1889. It was elevated to town status on September 1, 1941. On March 1, 1955, it annexed neighboring Uchigata and Takeda villages.

On March 28, 2005, Nakasato, along with the neighboring village of Kodomari (also from Kitatsugaru District), was merged to create the town of Nakadomari, and thus no longer exists as an independent municipality.

At the time of its merger, Nakasato had an estimated population of 10,384 and a population density of 68.48 persons per km^{2}. The total area was 151.63 km^{2}.

The town economy was dominated by agriculture and forestry. The town was served Route 339 (Japan) highway, and by Tsugaru-Nakasato Station, Fukōda Station and Ōzawanai Station on the Tsugaru Line of JR East.
