= Takerufuji Mikiya =

Japanese sumo wrestler (born 1999)

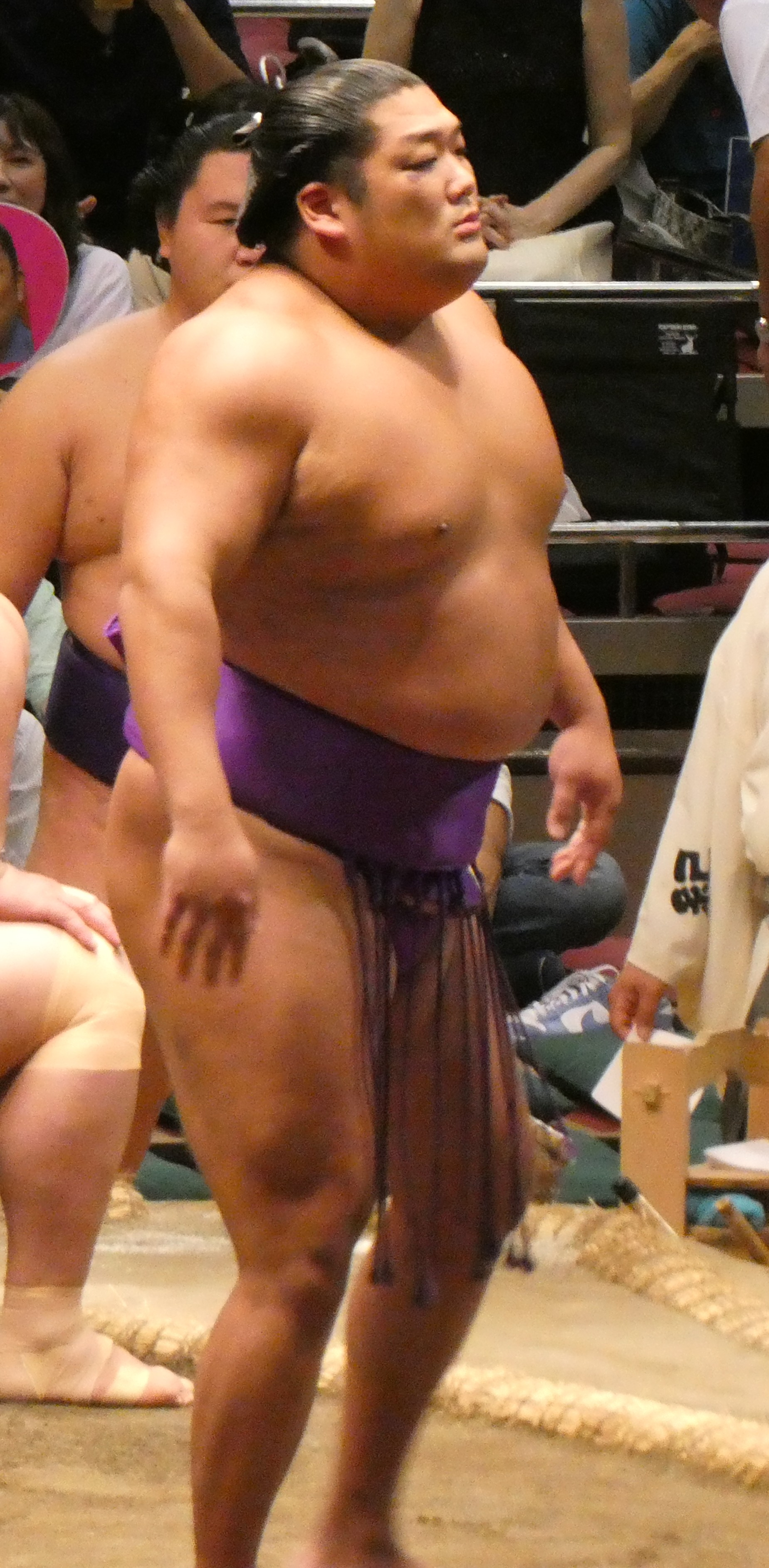
- Takerufuji in September 2024

Personal information
- Native name: 尊富士 弥輝也
- Born: Mikiya Ishioka; April 9, 1999 (age 27) Kanagi, Aomori Prefecture, Japan
- Height: 1.84 m (6 ft 1/2 in)
- Weight: 148 kg (326 lb; 23.3 st)

Sport
- Sport: Sumo
- Rank: see below
- University team: Nihon University
- Heya: Isegahama
- Debut: September, 2022
- Highest rank: Maegashira 4 (May, 2025)
- Championships: 1 (Makuuchi); 2 (Jūryō); 1 (Jonidan); 1 (Jonokuchi)
- Special Prizes: Fighting Spirit (1); Outstanding Performance (1); Technique (1)
- Updated on 28 April 2025

Takerufuji Mikiya (Japanese: 尊富士 弥輝也; born April 9, 1999, as Mikiya Ishioka (石岡 弥輝也, Ishioka Mikiya)) is a Japanese professional sumo wrestler from Goshogawara, Aomori Prefecture. His highest rank is maegashira 4.

Recognised as a wrestler of great potential, he stood out in 2024 by earning promotion straight into sumo's top division (makuuchi) after just one tournament in the second-highest jūryō division. In March 2024, he became the first wrestler in 110 years to win the championship in his inaugural top division tournament.

== Early life and sumo background ==
Mikiya Ishioka was born in the rural district of Kitatsugaru and grew up in a single-parent household, his mother (a former sprinter) having divorced his father during his high school years. His family are no strangers to sumo, his grandfather being an amateur wrestler and the coach of a local club. Ishioka began to take an interest in sport at nursery school. When he became a professional, he remembered that he used to go to training sessions so that they would give him pocket money to buy karaage. During his fourth year at elementary school, he took part in the National Wanpaku Championships, reaching the top 8 in the individual competition and winning the team competition with his school. He then chose to leave his hometown to join Tsugaru's Asahifuji Sumo Club (旭富士ジュニアクラブ). In his third year of junior high school, he won third place in the individual competition of the National Junior High School Tournament. He was also in the top eight of the individual competition of the All Junior High School Tournament. Finally, his team won the 2015 Hakuhō Cup team competition and he finished third place in the individual competition.

After junior high school, he enrolled at Tottori Jōhoku High School, a senior high school famous for its sumo club, where he became classmate with future makuuchi-ranked wrestler Rōga and trained with Yuki Ishida, a senior who was also in the sumo club. At Jōhoku High, he however also suffered from repeated knee injuries, including a torn anterior cruciate ligament in his left knee. He managed to rank himself in the top 8 of the Kanazawa's National High School Tournament.

After high school, he continued his amateur career by joining Nihon University, where he was classmates with Miyagino stable's Kihō and Ōtani. In his second year there, he injured his right knee and almost gave up on becoming a professional rikishi. Pushing through, he still achieved second place in the individual competition at the All-Japan University Invitational Tournament in Kanazawa. During his university years, he acquired a sense of rivalry with Daiki Nakamura, one of the great names of Japanese amateur sumo, facing him a total of four times and winning two of these matches.

Ishioka decided to turn professional, inspired by the record-breaking repromotion of Terunofuji, a former alumnus of Jōhoku High. He joined Isegahama stable because Terunofuji belongs to this heya and because stablemaster Isegahama (former yokozuna Asahifuji) maintained a training camp in Aomori, which enabled Ishioka to be in contact with the stable since his junior high school years.

== Early career ==
Ishioka was given the shikona, or ring name, Takerufuji (尊富士) with a kanji to denote a person of high status (尊) which is also a kanji in the name of the hero Yamato Takeru, with the hope that it will reach a high rank, combined with the kanji -fuji (富士) from the stablemaster's own name (Asahifuji). In the stable, he lives with stablemate and upper-division wrestler Nishikifuji.

In his first professional tournament, Takerufuji won the jonokuchi division with a perfect score, inflicting defeat on former makuuchi wrestler Kyokutaisei, who was making his return to tournament action after a three-tournament absence due to injury. At the following tournament, he won his second title, once again taking seven wins in jonidan. Takerufuji suffered his first defeat when he lost his third sandanme match, finishing the tournament with a score of 6–1. Promoted to makushita, Takerufuji continued to produce solid results but were unable to win the division's championship. His results did, however, earn him promotion to the jūryō division for the first tournament of 2024, when he recorded a fourth (kachi-koshi) victory over Tsushimanada. This promotion to sekitori status, secured for his eighth tournament, makes Takerufuji the seventh fastest wrestler to earn this promotion in sumo's modern history, ex-aequo with his stablemate Atamifuji and former ōzeki Konishiki VI.

Takerufuji began his sekitori career by becoming the eighth wrestler in sumo's modern history to record eight consecutive victories in his first jūryō tournament with a victory over Shishi. He later won the jūryō championship at his inaugural tournament, coinciding this victory with that of his stablemate, Yokozuna Terunofuji, who won the makuuchi one. Unusually, Takerufuji served as flag bearer in his senior's victory parade.

== Makuuchi ==
=== Top division promotion and historical title ===
When the announcement of his promotion was official, he commented he had hoped to equal the records for makuuchi promotions in nine tournaments since professional debut, which Jōkōryū had managed to achieve. Having been promoted after just one tournament in jūryō, Takerufuji is also the first wrestler since Endō in 2013 to achieve this feat, being the seventh overall in sumo's modern history.

During the 2024 Haru basho tournament, Takerufuji stood out by recording six consecutive victories in the first six days and took the sole tournament lead with a seventh consecutive victory over Shōnannoumi. Takerufuji continued his winning streak with an eighth consecutive victory over Ryūden, becoming the first newly promoted makuuchi wrestler to win that many in 13 years (since Kaisei's debut in 2011), as well as the first such wrestler in modern sumo history to lead a grand sumo tournament alone at the halfway point. Takerufuji continued his unbeaten progress in the top division by facing and beating a san'yaku-ranked wrestler for the first time, defeating Komusubi Abi on Day 9. On Day 10, Takerufuji defeated Ōnosato, his closest rival in the title race, securing a comfortable two-win lead over the rest of the wrestlers competing for the title. Takerufuji's victory the following day over an ōzeki opponent, Kotonowaka, matched the professional sumo record of 11 wins in the first 11 days by a newly-promoted makuuchi competitor set in January 1960 by Taihō. Takerufuji's streak came to an end on Day 12, however, when he was defeated by Ōzeki Hōshōryū. Unusually, Takerufuji's rapid progress forced an extraordinary meeting of the judging department on the thirteenth day to establish his last two matches, whereas by custom the judges normally wait until the fourteenth day to decide a wrestler's last match in a tournament. During Day 14, Takerufuji lost a second match against former ōzeki Asanoyama, injuring his right leg in the process and having to be taken from the dohyō area in a wheelchair. At the end of the day's fighting, this situation led to the assumption making Hōshōryū in a potential kingmaker's position, able to allow the final two competitors (Takerufuji and Ōnosato) to each win the tournament; on the one hand by defeating Ōnosato to allow Takerufuji to maintain a lead at the top (in the case of Takerufuji sitting out the final day or losing his final match) or on the other by getting beaten which would allow a potential playoff that Takerufuji (injured and in case of withdrawal) would have to lose by default. On the final day, however, Takerufuji decided to compete and won his match against Gōnoyama, getting out of a situation where he would have needed the result of the match between Ōnosato and Hōshōryū to know if he won the championship.

This championship victory for a beginner wrestler in the makuuchi division is a feat never achieved in 110 years, a first since Ryōgoku Kajinosuke II won the June 1914 tournament. The win also made Takerufuji the fastest wrestler to win a top-division championship at the time, doing so in 10 tournaments since his debut. Sources within the Japan Sumo Association also pointed out that he is the only person to win a tournament without being able to style a proper ōichōmage topknot in recorded sumo history. For his performances at the tournament, Takerufuji also simultaneously received the three special prizes awarded to highlight the abilities of deserving wrestlers, becoming the first to achieve a sanshō sweep in 24 years, since Kotomitsuki also simultaneously received the three awards at the November 2000 tournament. Finally, Takerufuji is the first wrestler from Aomori Prefecture to win a top division tournament in 26 years, since former ōzeki Takanonami in November 1997. After his championship, Aomori Prefecture announced plans to award Takerufuji its prefectural prize, making him the ninth sumo wrestler overall to receive it and the first since his master Asahifuji. At the same time, his hometown of Goshogawara announced the creation of its own "Citizen's Honor Award", with the intention of making Takerufuji the first recipient of the prize. Regarding his rivalry with Ōnosato, the president of the Yokozuna Deliberation Council, Masayuki Yamauchi, defined it in his review of the tournament as that of the "ryūko" (龍虎), an expression drawing a parallel between the rivalry of the tiger and the dragon to designate two opponents of equal strength. After the win, Takerufuji, who showed up for his Day 15 match with only a few hours to spare, said that he had been diagnosed with a ligament injury in his right ankle following his loss to Asanoyama the day before. Despite the suggestion from his stablemaster Isegahama (the 63rd yokozuna Asahifuji) to withdraw, Takerufuji said that he would have regretted it for the rest of his life if he did. "If you ever ask me to do it again, there's no way I would be able to," he said. Isegahama, who was on the NHK broadcast that day, said that he was happy with the result and praised Takerufuji for having a strong will.

=== Injury, demotion and return ===
Thanks to his historic title, Takerufuji was promoted to maegashira 6 for his second tournament in the top division. Shortly before the start of the May tournament, on 2 May, he travelled to his hometown of Goshogawara, where a parade was held in his honour to celebrate his performance. Around 55,000 people attended the event, more than the town's population of 50,000. The parade was marked by Takerufuji's accompaniment by a 23-metre-high nebuta representing Susanoo-no-Mikoto.

Due to his sprained ankle injury, Takerufuji decided not to take part in the May tournament, as he had only been able to train a little, and only a week before the start of the tournament. Prior to the start of the July tournament, Takerufuji, demoted to jūryō 2, withdrew again. Stablemaster Isegahama left open the possibility of Takerufuji entering the July tournament while it is in progress depending on his recovery, citing his strong desire to participate. He returned at the halfway point of the competition, scoring two victories before pulling out again on Day 10. Newspapers reported that as a result of the two wins it was very likely that Takerufuji would remain ranked in jūryō for the September 2024 tournament, rather than be demoted out of sekitori status to the makushita division.

After the September tournament, during which he won the jūryō championship, it was confirmed when the banzuke for the November 2024 tournament was published that Takerufuji had been promoted to maegashira 16. He achieved winning records in his first three tournaments back in the top division, leading to his holding a career-high rank of maegashira 4 for the May 2025 tournament.

At the July 2025 tournament, Takerufuji appeared to injure his upper right arm following his Day 6 win over Sadanoumi. He returned to the ring the following day with tape around the arm, but won just once in his next six matches. He pulled out on Day 13 after suffering his eighth loss of the tournament, citing pain in the affected arm. His medical certificate with the Sumo Association indicated a bicep tear, requiring about two months of treatment. Stablemaster Isegahama (the 73rd yokozuna Terunofuji) announced that Takerufuji would not compete in any matches at the September 2025 tournament.

In July 2026, before the final day of the tournament, it was announced that Takerufuji could win a second special prize for Fighting Spirit if he won his last match. Takerufuji lost to Kotoeihō and did not win the award.

== Fighting style ==
Takerufuji specializes in thrusting and pushing techniques (tsuki/oshi). He regularly wins by oshi-dashi (push out) and hataki-komi (slap down). Takerufuji's speed, both physical and mental, is also highlighted as one of his greatest strengths. In an article for Sports Hochi, Oguruma (former ōzeki Kotokaze) compared this ability with that of former sekiwake Kotonishiki, while at the same time former yokozuna Wakanohana III praised in Nikkan Sports his ability to adapt and always practice an offensive style.

It is also noted that Takerufuji can lift 220 kg (490 lb; 35 st) in the bench press. Nevertheless, after the January 2024 tournament, he revealed that on the advice of Yokozuna Terunofuji he had refrained from continuing any strength training in order to focus more on the lower body.

== Personal life ==
Takerufuji's maternal grandfather, a coach at a local sumo club in Goshogawara, is a former amateur wrestler who served as an Aomori prefectural official.

== Career record ==
Takerufuji Mikiya
Year	January Hatsu basho, Tokyo	March Haru basho, Osaka	May Natsu basho, Tokyo	July Nagoya basho, Nagoya	September Aki basho, Tokyo	November Kyūshū basho, Fukuoka
2022	x	x	x	x	(Maezumō)	West Jonokuchi #15; 7–0; Champion
2023	West Jonidan #15; 7–0; Champion	West Sandanme #19; 6–1	East Makushita #41; 6–1	East Makushita #17; 6–1	East Makushita #6; 5–2	West Makushita #1; 6–1
2024	East Jūryō #10; 13–2; Champion	East Maegashira #17; 13–2; FOT	East Maegashira #6; Sat out due to injury 0–0–15	East Jūryō #2; 2–1–12	West Jūryō #11; 13–2; Champion	West Maegashira #16; 10–5
2025	West Maegashira #11; 10–5	West Maegashira #6; 9–6	East Maegashira #4; 6–9	East Maegashira #6; 5–8–2	East Maegashira #12; Sat out due to injury 0–0–15	East Jūryō #7; 8–7
2026	West Jūryō #5; 8–7	West Jūryō #4; 8–7	West Jūryō #2; 11–4	West Maegashira #13; 10–5	East Maegashira #8; 9–6	East Maegashira #4; 5–10
Record given as wins–losses–absences Top division champion Top division runner-up Retired Non-participation Jūryō Lower divisions Sanshō key: F=Fighting spirit; O=Outstanding performance; T=Technique Also shown: ★=Kinboshi; P=Playoff(s); Divisions: Makuuchi — Jūryō — Makushita — Sandanme — Jonidan — Jonokuchi Makuuchi ranks: Yokozuna — Ōzeki — Sekiwake — Komusubi — Maegashira

== See also ==
- Glossary of sumo terms
- List of active sumo wrestlers
- List of active special prize winners
- List of sumo record holders
- List of sumo top division champions
- List of sumo second division champions
