= Sannobō Site =

Archaeological site in Japan

Sannobō ruins
- 山王坊遺跡 (Japanese)
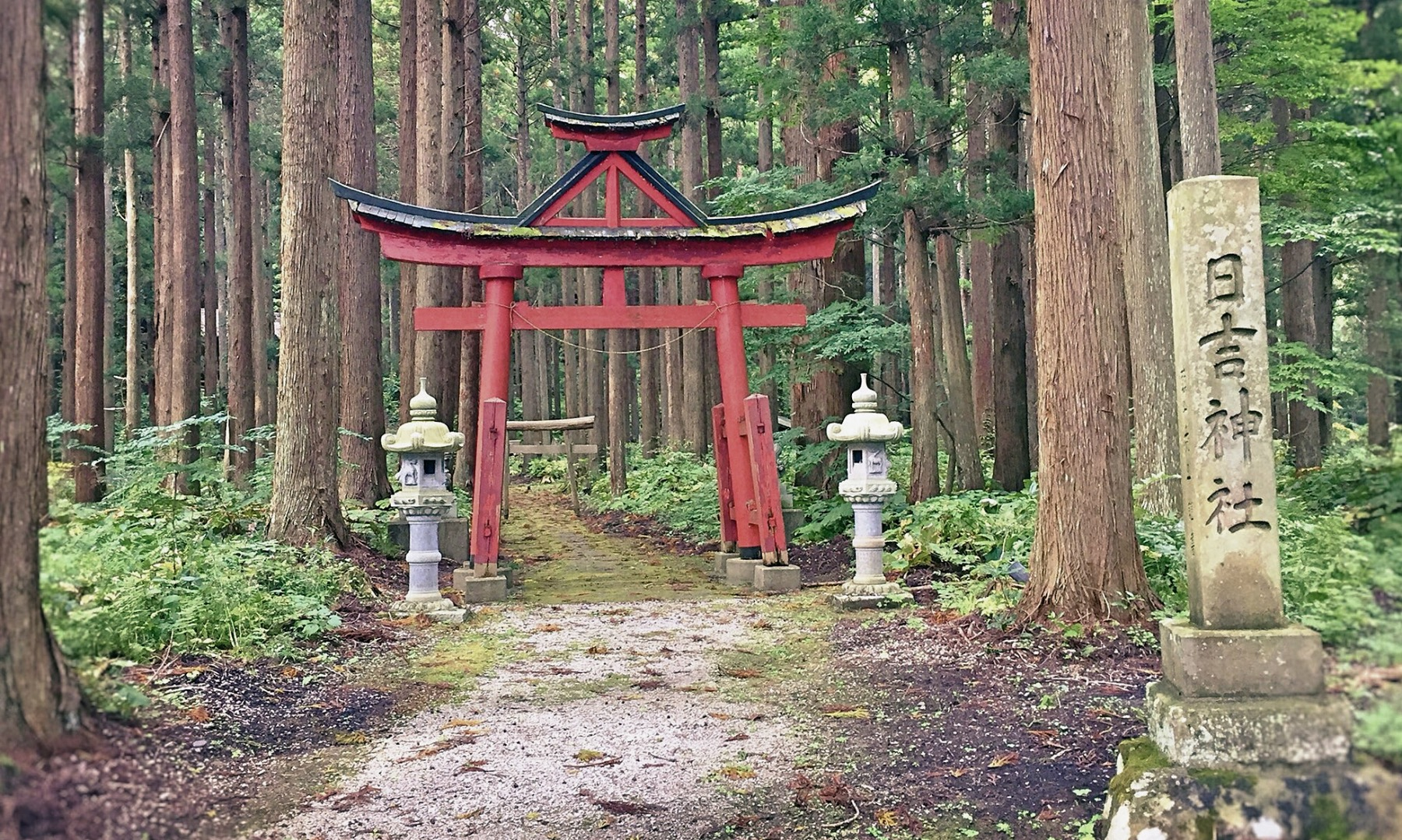
- Goshogawara Hiyoshi Jinja

- Location within Aomori Prefecture Location within Japan
- 41°03′55″N 140°22′05″E
- Type: temple ruins
- Periods: Muromachi period
- Location: Goshogawara, Aomori, Japan
- Region: Tōhoku region

Site notes
- Condition: ruins
- Public access: Yes (no public facilities)

Sannobō ruins (山王坊遺跡, Sannobō iseki) is an archaeological site in what is now the city of Goshogawara, Aomori Prefecture, in the Tōhoku region of northern Japan containing the ruins of a Muromachi period Buddhist temple. The remains were designated a National Historic Site in 2017 by the Japanese government.

== Overview ==
The site is located on the northern shore of Lake Jūsan, facing the Sea of Japan, almost in the center of the Tsugaru Peninsula in a forested valley near the Sannobō River. The site has a Shinto Shrine, the Goshogawara Hiyoshi Jinja which is a branch of the famous Hiyoshi Taisha in Ōtsu, Shiga. Under the pre-Meiji period amalgamation of Buddhism with Shintoism (Honji suijaku), the kami of the Hiyoshi Taisha was referred to as "Sannō Gongen", and the shrine has a tradition that a Buddhist temple called Aun-ji (阿吽寺) was once located nearby. The temple was destroyed by the Nanbu clan when they conquered his area in 1443, and had never been rebuilt, although its location had been preserved by the shrine as a sacred site.

Excavations thus far have revealed the foundation stones of several buildings preserved in very good condition, including the foundations of the South Gate, Hondō, Kairō, Oku-no-in, and several smaller structures. The age of these foundations range from the mid-14th century to the mid-15th century. During this period, this area was controlled by the Andō clan, who had close ties with the Ashikaga Shogunate and the layout is similar to contemporary temple layouts in Kyoto during the Nanboku-chō and Muromachi periods.

== See also ==
- List of Historic Sites of Japan (Aomori)
