= List of Intangible Cultural Properties of Japan (Aomori) =

This list is of the Intangible Cultural Properties of Japan in the Prefecture of Aomori.

== National Cultural Properties ==
As of 1 February 2015, zero Important Intangible Cultural Properties have been designated.

== Prefectural Cultural Properties ==
As of 19 December 2014, two properties have been designated at a prefectural level.

Property	Holder	Comments	Image	Ref.
Nezasa-ha Ōnezasa-ryū Kinpū-ryū Shakuhachi 根笹派大音笹流錦風流尺八; Nezasa-ha Ōnezasa-ryū Kinpū-ryū shakuhachi	Sudō Shūhō (須藤脩鵬), Yamada Fumio (山田史生), Hirao Yūzō (平尾雄三), Fujita Masahiro (藤田昌宏)			
Tsugaru Sōkyoku Ikuta-ryū 津軽箏曲郁田流; Tsugaru sōkyoku Ikuta-ryū	Kushibiki Reiko (櫛引禮子), Kasai Yōko (葛西洋子), Kasai Yoshiko (葛西淑子)			

== Municipal Cultural Properties ==
As of 1 May 2014, two properties have been designated at a municipal level.

Property	Holder	Comments	Image	Ref.
Mushi-okuri 虫おくり mushi-okuri	Goshogawara City Mushi-okuri Preservation Society (五所川原市虫おくり保存会)	annual festival held in mid-June to "send off" insects; Cultural Property of Goshogawara		
Urushi-kawa Lion Dance 漆川獅子舞; Urushi-kawa shishi mai	Goshogawara City Urushi-kawa Shishi-mai Preservation Society (五所川原漆川獅子舞保存会)	Cultural Property of Goshogawara		

== See also ==
- Cultural Properties of Japan
- Tsugaru-jamisen
- Aomori Nebuta Matsuri
