= Tsugaru Plain =

Plain in Japan

Coordinates: 40°50′N 140°25′E

The Tsugaru Plain is an alluvial plain in Japan, located in the western part of Aomori Prefecture on the Honshu Island.

The total area of the plain is about 1000 km², its length is about 60 km and width is about 20 km.

Iwaki River crosses the plain before emptying into Lake Jūsan.
