= Iwaki River =

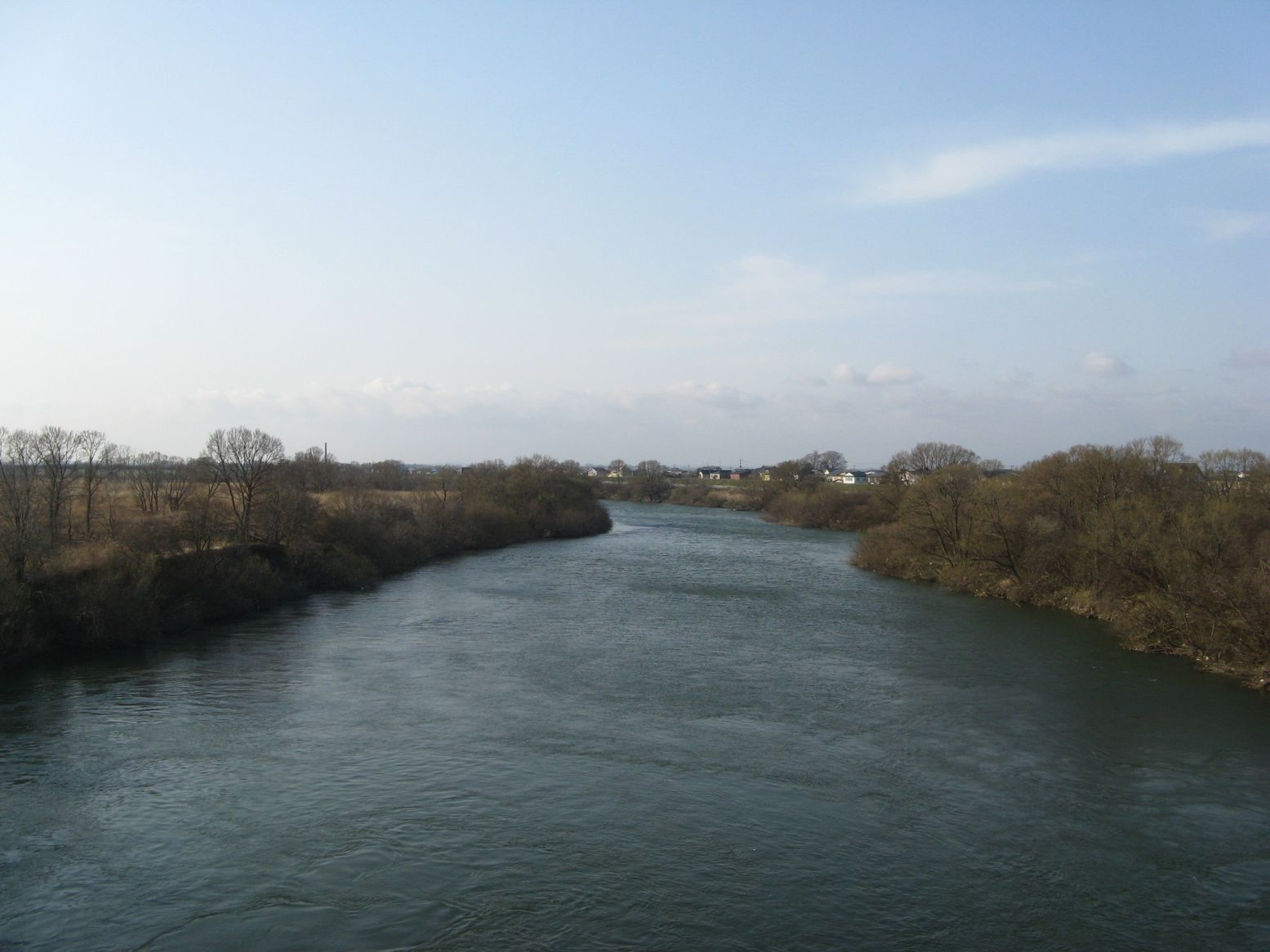
- Iwaki River, view north from Goshogawara, Aomori Prefecture

- Location within Japan
- Native name: 岩木川 (Japanese)

Location
- Country: Japan

Physical characteristics
- Source
  - location: Shirakami-Sanchi
- Mouth
  - location: Japan Sea via Lake Jūsan, Aomori Prefecture
  - coordinates: 41°00′48″N 140°21′50″E
  - elevation: 0 m (0 ft)
- Length: 102 km (63 mi)
- Basin size: 2,544 km^{2} (982 sq mi)

The Iwaki River (岩木川, Iwaki-gawa) is a river that crosses western Aomori Prefecture, Japan. It is 102 kilometers (63 mi) in length and has a drainage area of 2,544 square kilometers (982 sq mi). Under the Rivers Act of 1964 the Iwaki is designated as a Class 1 River and is managed by the Japanese Ministry of Land, Infrastructure, Transport and Tourism. The Iwaki River is the longest river in Aomori Prefecture, and is the source of irrigation for the large-scale rice and apple production of the prefecture. The Iwaki River, in the Tōhoku region north of the Fukushima Daiichi Nuclear Power Plant, remains unpolluted by radioactive materials after the Fukushima Daiichi nuclear disaster. Testing for caesium-134 and caesium-137 is carried out and published on a bimonthly basis.

== Geography ==
The source of the Iwaki River is at Mount Ganmori (987 metres (3,238 ft))^{A} in the Shirakami-Sanchi region, a mountainous, unspoiled expanse of virgin forest which spans both Akita and Aomori Prefectures. The river flows eastward as a small mountain stream, then joins several tributaries to form the scenic Meya Ravine. The multi-purpose Meya Dam is located in the upper reaches of the Iwaki River. The river turns sharply northward at the city of Hirosaki. The river crosses the broad Tsugaru Plain, where it is joined by the Aseishi, Hira, and To rivers before emptying into Lake Jūsan on the western coast of the Tsugaru Peninsula. The mouth of the Iwaki River at Lake Jūsan is known as Mitoguchi. Parts of the Iwaki River are protected as part of Towada-Hachimantai National Park, Tsugaru Quasi-National Park, and five prefectural parks. It flows through the following municipalities: Nishimeya, Hirosaki, Fujisaki, Itayanagi, Tsuruta, Tsugaru, Goshogawara, Nakadomari, and Shiura, where it enters Lake Jūsan.

=== Tributaries ===
- Anmon River (暗門川, Anmon-gawa)
- Ōsawa River (大沢, Ōsawa-gawa)
- Yunosawa River (湯ノ沢川, Yunosawa-gawa)
- Taiaki River (大秋川, Taiaki-gawa)
- Sōma River (相馬川, Sōma-gawa)
- Aseishi River (浅瀬石川, Aseishi-gawa)
- Hira River (平川, Hira-gawa)
- To River (十川, To-gawa)
- Kanagi River (金木川, Kanagi-gawa)

== History ==
=== Early history ===
The Iwaki River supported numerous villages as early as the Jōmon period (14,000 – 300 BCE) as evidenced by numerous shell mounds. The river was revered as the "mother of the Tsugaru Plain" throughout its early history. The Iwaki River region, located in the vast northern Mutsu Province, came under the control of the central government throughout much of the Heian period (794–1185). The Northern Fujiwara clan, based in Hiraizumi in present-day Iwate Prefecture, controlled the rich trade of the Port of Tosa in present-day Goshogawara. Despite the loss of control of much of Japan later in the Heian period, the court maintained some level of military presence in Mutsu. This control ended when the Northern Fujiwara were conquered by Minamoto no Yoritomo (1147–1199) and clans of the Kantō region, and the Iwaki River region came under the direct control of the Kamakura shogunate. By the mid-Kamakura period the Akita clan ruled the area, and the ranches, agriculture of the Iwaki River region, and trade with the Ainu. The Port of Tosa was destroyed in an enormous tsunami in 1340. The Akita clan was eventually defeated by the Nanbu clan during the Sengoku period (1467–1573). Numerous castles were constructed along the Iwaki River, notably Hirosaki Castle.

=== Edo period ===
The Tokugawa shogunate quickly established stability in the Iwaki River region at the beginning of the Edo period (1603–1868). The course of the Iwaki River was diverted and developed for agricultural as part of an effort by the Tokugawa shogunate for the increase of agricultural output across Japan. The original path of the upper reaches of the Iwaki River remains unclear. There were originally two rivers in the area of the castle town of Hirosaki, and at some point in the late 17th century they were diverted into a single river, the Iwaki. The Tsugaru Domain began large-scale work on the Iwaki River in the same period to open new rice paddies on the Tsugaru Plain. The Iwaki River had a lively riverboat trade, and rice storehouses controlled by the Tokugawa shogunate were built in Sanzeji (present-day Akita City), Fujisaki, Itayanoki (present-day Itayanagi), and Kanagi. The rice was collected at the Port of Jūsan in present-day Goshogawara at the mouth of the river at Lake Jūsan. From there the rice was transported to Ajigasawa on the Sea of Japan to be shipped to the Edo capitol.

=== Modern period ===
After the Meiji Restoration in 1868 the construction of railroads in Aomori Prefecture, specifically the Ōu Main Line, ended the comparatively inefficient riverboat trade along the Iwaki River in favor of the movement of agricultural cargo by rail. In the 20th century the central government of Japan took direct control of riverworks to prevent flooding on the Iwaki, a chronic problem recorded as early as the Edo period. The Iwaki River Improvement Plan (岩木川改修計画, Iwakigawa Kaishuu Keikaku) was officially approved by the Diet of Japan in 1917. Large-scale flood prevention works began shortly afterwards. The mouth of the river at Lake Jūsan, Mitoguchi, suffered frequent blockage between November and April due to strong winds and waves, a feature of the harsh climate of northern Aomori Prefecture. Projects to remove blockages of the river at Mitoguchi began in the Meiji period, but caused a change in water levels on the upper reaches of the river. The controversy over construction work at Mitoguchi became increasingly controversial, resulting in violent clashes between residents of the upper and lower regions of the Iwaki River in 1890. A pier to prevent blockage was excavated and constructed at the mouth of the river between 1930 and 1946. The passageway allows year round access to the river. Numerous bridges were also constructed across the Iwaki River to improve transportation in Aomori Prefecture.

== Use ==
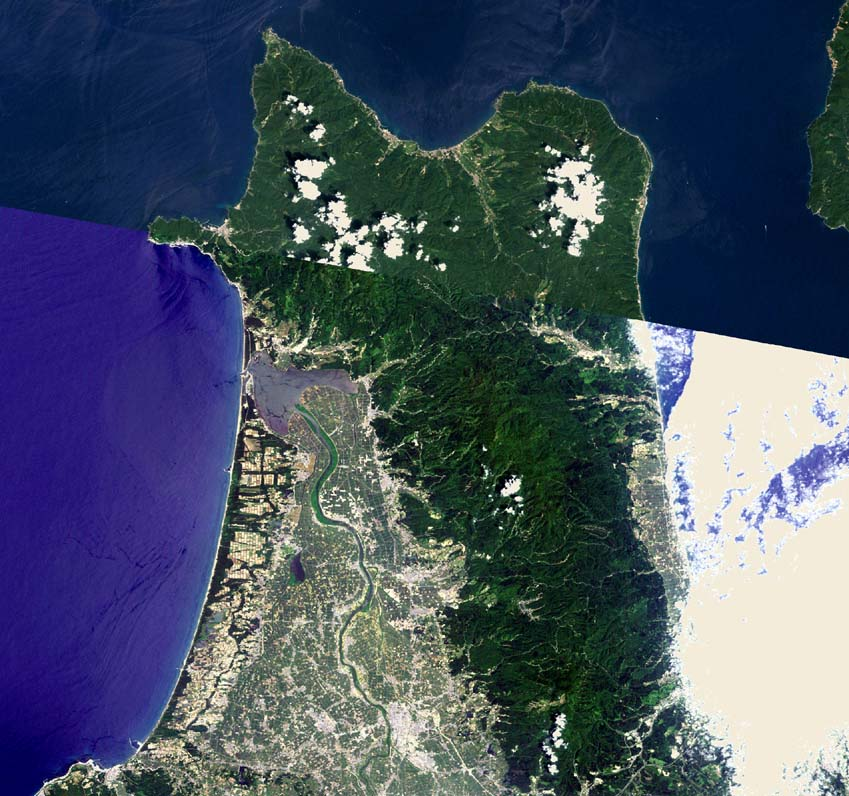
Iwaki River on the Tsugaru Peninsula

The Iwaki River is a major source of water for irrigation. Numerous irrigation canals have been built across the Tsugaru Plain, and the Iwaki supports the paddies for vast production of rice in Aomori Prefecture. The river is called "the mother of Tsugaru" for this reason. Aomori Prefecture is the largest producer of apples in Japan, and the upper zone of the Iwaki River provides irrigation for an extensive network of orchards, especially in the area of Hirosaki City. The commercial fishery of ayu is no longer held on the Iwaki, but its lower reaches and mouth of the river at Mitoguchi are a source of commercial clam production.

== Fauna and flora ==
=== Upper ===
The source of the Iwaki, in the Shirakami-Sanchi, is home to large virgin expanses of the buna, Siebold's beech. This area, which is also the source of the Oirase River, is designated a UNESCO World Heritage Site. The upper reaches of the Iwaki are a spawning area of the ayu, also known as the sweetfish, and ugui, the Japanese dace. The area is also known as a home for the kingfisher and the Asian house martin. Tsuruyoshi, a creeping species of the common reed and the branched bur-reed can be found in this area.

=== Middle ===
The middle reaches of the river, also home to the apple orchards of Aomori, are noted for long belts of willows. The northern goshawk, the nosuri, a species of the common buzzard, and the black kite have breeding grounds in the area.

=== Lower ===
The lower reaches of the Iwaki were once a vast reed bed. Numerous bird species are protected in this area, including the marsh grassbird, also known as the Japanese swamp warbler, and the Japanese reed bunting, both of which are threatened by habitat loss. The mākuosamu and Dytiscidae species of beetles are indigenous to the area. The least weasel, common in other areas of the world, is increasingly rare in the Iwaki River region and may become a protected species. The yamato shijimi, a species of clam used in Japanese cuisine, is common in the brackish area of the mouth of the Iwaki River at Mitoguchi and Lake Jūsan.

== Footnotes ==
A. Mount Iwaki (1,624.7 metres; 5,330 ft) is not the source of the Iwaki River. While the mountain and river are located in the Tsugaru region and share a common name, Mount Iwaki is located to the west of the middle reaches of Iwaki River, far north of the source of the river.
