= Ryohei Fujiwara =

Japanese baseball player

Ryohei Fujiwara 藤原 良平
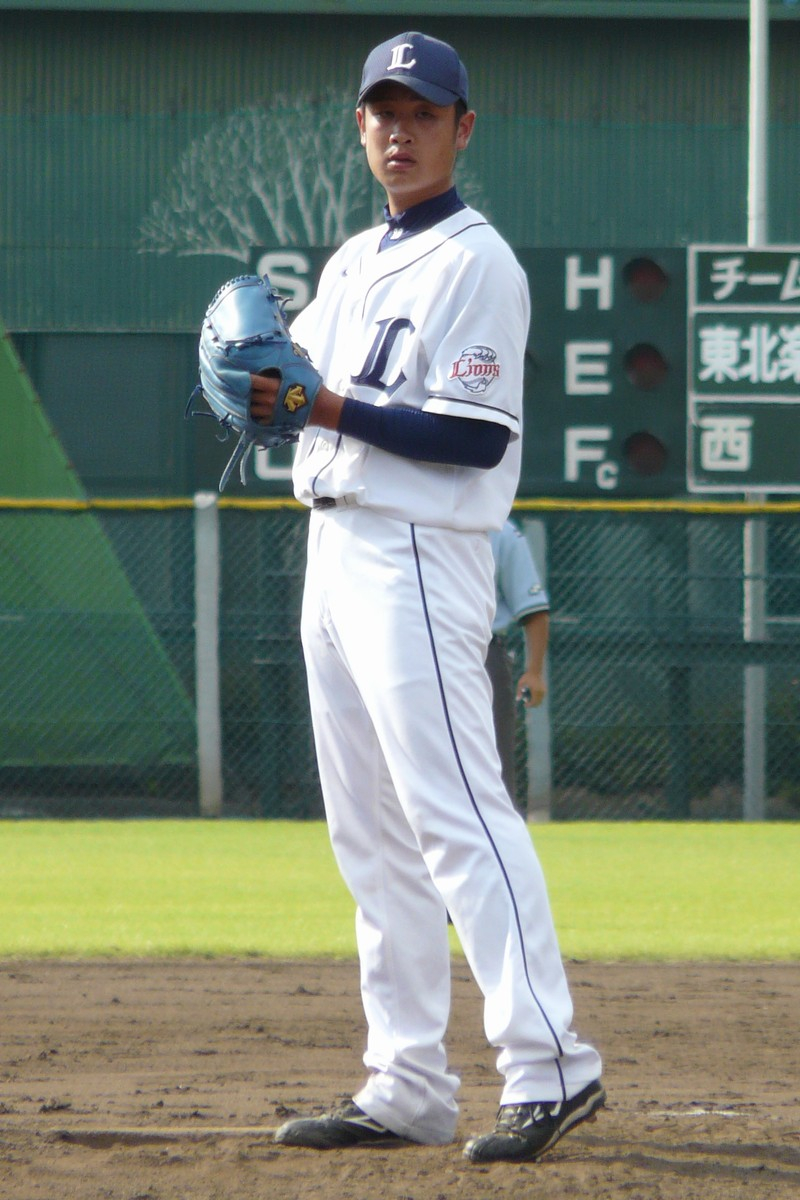
- Fujiwara with the Saitama Seibu Lions
- Pitcher
- Born: February 15, 1986 (age 40); Hyogo, Japan
- Bats: Right Throws: Right
- Stats at Baseball Reference

Teams
- Saitama Seibu Lions (2008–2018)
- Last updated on: 29 January 2009

Ryohei Fujiwara (藤原 良平, Fujiwara Ryohei; born in Hyogo, Japan) is a former Japanese professional Nippon Professional Baseball player for the Saitama Seibu Lions in Japan's Pacific League. He attended Tottori Jōhoku High School.
