= Tottori Jōhoku High School =

Private high school in Tottori, Japan

Tottori Jōhoku High School 鳥取城北高校
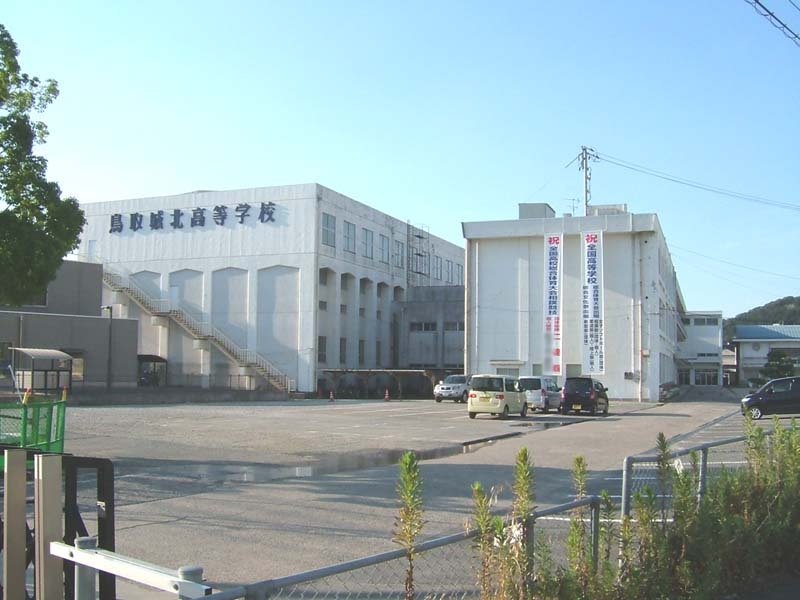

Location
- 848 Nishihonji; Tottori Prefecture; Tottori, Japan
- Coordinates: 35.5089°N 134.2241°E

Information
- School type: Private, Coeducational
- Motto: 質実剛毅 "simplicity and fortitude"
- Established: 1963
- School number: 0857-23-3502
- Principal: Tokiyoshi Ishiura
- Enrollment: approx. 1000 students
- Colors: dark red and white
- Website: In Japanese https://www.tottori-johoku.ed.jp/

Tottori Jōhoku High School, also commonly known as Jōhoku High, is a private high school located in Tottori, Tottori Prefecture, Japan.

The school is known for its baseball and sumo clubs, and a range of club activities and studies.

== History ==
The school was founded on March 12, 1963, by the Tottori Gakuen Educational Corporation but only effectively opened in April of the same year. At the time, only regular, commercial, and home economics courses were established. In 1976, the school established a department of Major Studies followed by a General Education Course (Liberal Arts, University Preparatory Course, Physical Education, and Shigaku Course) and the Commerce Course (Commerce and Information Processing Course) in 1988. In March 2004, the Major Studies department was closed. In 2009, the physical education course became coeducational. Tokiyoshi Ishiura is the current principal and chairman of the board.

== Features and characteristics ==
=== Educational policy ===
Since the 2013 school year, the school has been offering six classes a day, each lasting 45 minutes. In addition, students in the "Shigaku" course have a special 7th period class, and for students who are involved in club activities, supplementary classes are offered after the club activities are over. The school also offers classes after school and on weekends and holidays for students who volunteer. The employment rate of Tottori Jōhoku High School has been 100% for seven consecutive years (2014–2021).

=== Courses ===
Tottori Jōhoku High School's general program have three courses: the "Shigaku Course", the "Kenshi Course", and the "Sports Science Course". The three courses vary greatly in terms of difficulty and goals.

==== Shigaku Course (志学コース) ====
The Shigaku course is a core in which students study with the aim of advancing to a national or public university or a highly competitive private university. It is a course that is close to the image of a general high school entrance course.

In the Shigaku course, second year students give first year students advice on study and school life with a system of tutoring, making it possible to create vertical connections between seniors and juniors students.

In addition, there are educational efforts to pass the difficult university exams, such as mini-tests every day and a study camp in September of the third year, so that students can work together to take the exam.

==== Kenshi Course (研志コース) ====
The goal of this course is to aim for a range of career paths, such as entering a university or vocational school or finding a job. Beginning in the first year, students are divided into a "university entrance class", which aims to go on to higher education, and an "inquiry class", which aims to get the students a job directly after high school.

==== Sports science course (スポーツ科学コース) ====
In the Sports Science Course, students spend their days in their sports disciplines in the Tottori Jōhoku campus. The course has an advanced class aimed at advancing to university, allowing students to aim for both academic and athletic successes. Some graduates went on to national universities from the special course.

In this particular course, Tottori Jōhoku High School graduated have gone on to success in sports such as baseball and sumo.

== Clubs ==
=== Sports ===
Tottori Jōhoku High School has athletic facilities including an artificial turf field, tartan course, baseball field, training room, and arena gymnasium.

==== Sumo ====
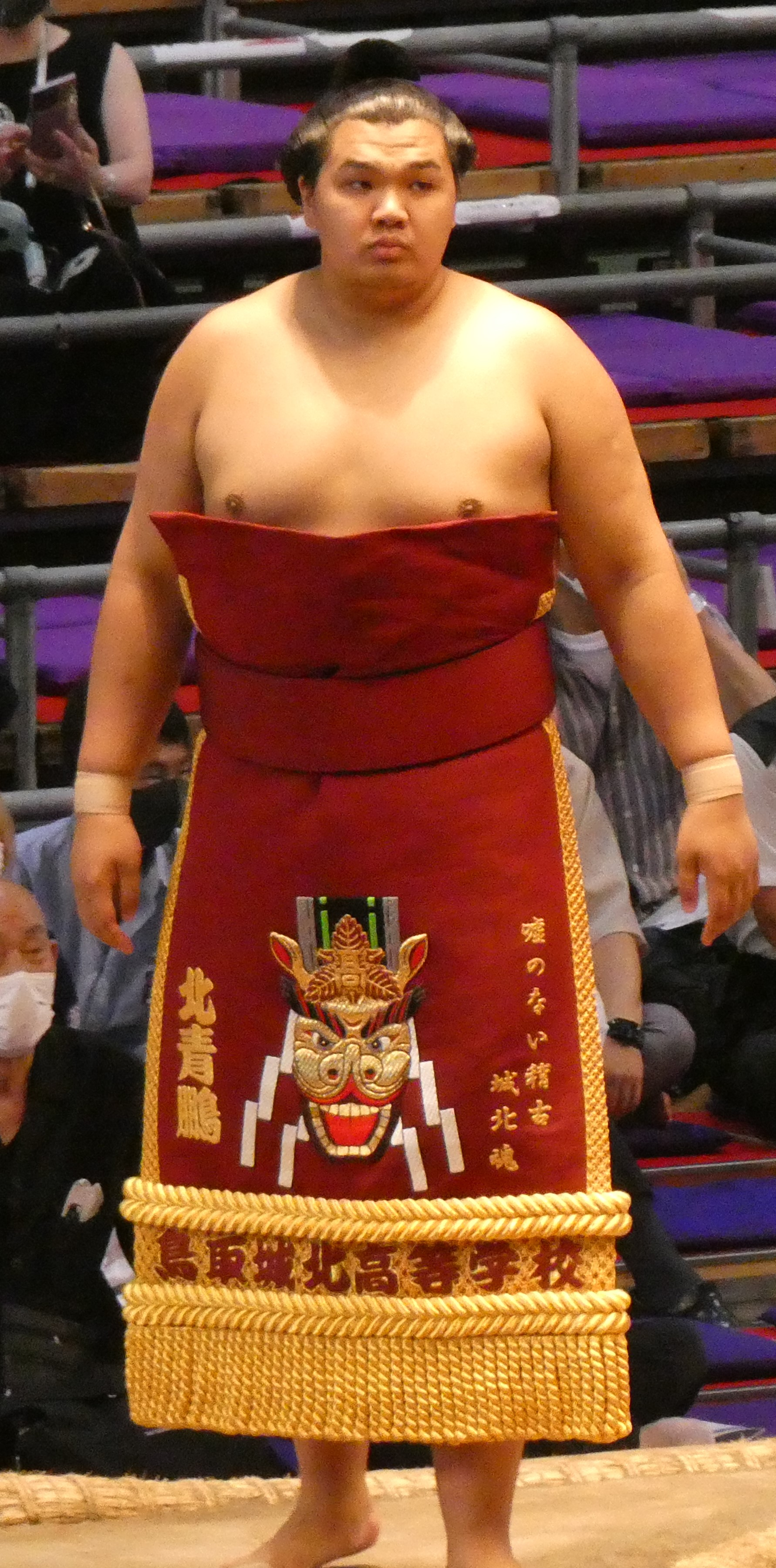
Hokuseihō with his Johōku High keshō-mawashi

The sumo club was founded in 1968. Ishiura, the head of the sumo club, is the current director of the school board and its principal. The coach of the club, Mongolian Rentsendorj Gantugs, is a former recruit of the school. A number of sekitori come from the ranks of the school, among whom are yokozuna Terunofuji, sekiwake Ichinojō, maegashira Ishiura, Mitoryū and Hokuseihō, Hakunofuji, Takerufuji and juryō Takakento. In May 2015, Terunofuji won professional sumo's top division championship, or yūshō, and he visited the school in October 2021 shortly after being promoted to yokozuna. Since the opening of the club, Tottori Jōhoku have produced 17 sekitori. The school has links to the former Miyagino stable.

Between 2019 and 2022, Tottori Jōhoku's sumo team won four team championships and ended second place in one. In March 2024, the school won its first team competition in five years at the Kōchi's National High School Sumo Draft Tournament. Individually, and during the same period, its wrestlers won three individual championships (including medium-weight and open-weight classes). Since 2021, it is customary for the school to present a keshō-mawashi (ceremonial apron) to each of its former student who is promoted to juryō. So far, the school has offered a keshō-mawashi to Hokuseihō, Takakento, Rōga and Hakunofuji. The aprons are usually dark red (after the colour of the school) with the head of a kirin, a traditional art figure from the Inaba Province (now Tottori Prefecture), depicted in the center. The words "Training without lies," the motto of the Sumo Club, and "Johōku spirit," a reminder of the alma mater, are embroidered on the side of the head along with the name of the wrestler.

==== Baseball ====
The school's baseball club was founded in 1969 and has the largest number of members in the prefecture (135 in 2018). The current coach of the team, Hiroyuki Yamaki, is a graduate and a former coach at Shimane's prestigious Enokawa High School baseball club (now Iwami Chisuikan High School). Since its creation, the club have participated in eight Kōshien tournaments, four spring invitationals and four summer national championships. They have also been successful at the Tottori prefectural level, having won the tournament 11 times, most recently in 2023. In February 2023, former professional baseball player Kazuhisa Kawaguchi, a native of Tottori-city and Tottori Jōhoku graduate, was appointed prefectural advisor for baseball competitions in Tottori. Other successful alumni include Atsushi Nomi and Ryohei Fujiwara.

== Alumni ==
=== Sumo ===
- Terunofuji Haruo, sumo's 73rd yokozuna
- Mitoryū Takayuki, first non-Japanese to win the title of amateur-yokozuna
- Rōga Tokiyoshi, first foreigner to win the title of high-school yokozuna
- Kotomitsuki Keiji
- Ichinojō Takashi
- Takanoiwa Yoshimori
- Sakaizawa Kenichi
- Ishiura Masakatsu
- Hokuseihō Osamu
- Takakento Terutora
- Hakunofuji Tetsuya
- Takerufuji Mikiya

=== Baseball ===
- Ryohei Fujiwara, professional player
- Atsushi Nomi, professional player
- Kazuhisa Kawaguchi, prefectural advisor, former professional player

=== Others ===
- Dancho Yasuda, TV celebrity
- Tanaka Seiji, former professional boxer (flyweight)
- Yuki Ishida, professional wrestler
