= Goshogawara Sue Pottery Kiln Site =

Goshogawara Sue Ware Kiln Site
- 五所川原須恵器窯跡 (Japanese)
- Location in Japan Goshogawara Sue Pottery Kiln Site (Japan)
- 40°45′31″N 140°32′49″E
- Periods: Heian period
- Location: Goshogawara, Aomori, Japan
- Region: Tōhoku region

Site notes
- Elevation: 25 m (82 ft)
- Excavation dates: 1998
- Discovered: 1967
- Public access: Yes (no public facilities)

The Goshogawara Sue Pottery Kiln Site (五所川原須恵器窯跡, Goshogawara Sueki kama ato) is an archaeological site consisting of the remains of Heian period kilns located in what is now the city of Goshogawara, Aomori Prefecture in the Tōhoku region of northern Japan. It is protected by the central government as a National Historic Site.

== Overview ==
Sue pottery (須恵器, sueki) was a blue-gray form of unglazed stoneware which was produced in Japan and southern Korea over many centuries from during the Kofun through the Heian periods, and was initially used for funerary and ritual objects Sue pottery is believed to have originated in the 5th or 6th century in the Kaya region of southern Korea, and was brought to Japan by immigrant craftsmen. It was produced in numerous locations around Japan. By the Heian period, it had become a utilitarian pottery.

The Goshogawara Sue Kiln Ruins date from the middle of the 9th century to the late 10th century, or the middle of the Heian period. The site is located approximately 15 kilometers southeast of the center of present-day Goshogawara, on a small hill on a tributary of the Maedano River, and consists of at least 40 kilns. However, the locations are divided into three separate groups across an area measuring 3.5 kilometers east–west by five kilometers north–south. The site was discovered during construction work for forestry roads in 1967. Each kiln is built semi-underground into the slope of a hill, and are a stepless form of the traditional anagama kiln. Each kiln has a length of approximately five meters and a width and height of one meter. The pottery produced was primarily storage devices such as long neck bottles, pots, jars, and jars, most of which have letters and symbols engraved with a spatula, which is a distinctive feature of pottery produced at this site.

Radiocarbon dating of shards found at the site mark it as the northernmost known site at which this type of Sue pottery is known to have been produced. The pottery produced from the site has been found in at archaeological sites to the south in Akita, and Iwate Prefecture and north in Hokkaidō, indicating ongoing trade across the Tsugaru Strait from the earliest times.

The site has been excavated since 1998 by the Goshogawara Board of Education, and of the 40 kiln sites, 13 were in good preservation and qualified for protection as a National Historic Site. It is located approximately 20 minutes by car from Daishaka Station on the JR East Ōu Main Line.

== See also ==
- List of Historic Sites of Japan (Aomori)
