= Kodomari, Aomori =

Kodomari 小泊村
- Former municipality
- Flag Emblem

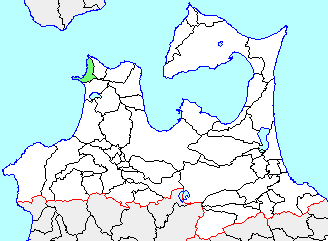
- Location of Kodomari in Aomori Prefecture

- Location in Japan
- Coordinates: 41°7′52.9″N 140°18′25.2″E
- Country: Japan
- Region: Tōhoku
- Prefecture: Aomori Prefecture
- District: Kitatsugaru
- Merged: March 28, 2005 (now part of Nakadomari)

Area
  - Total: 64.62 km^{2} (24.95 sq mi)

Population (March 1, 2005)
  - Total: 3,989
  - Density: 61.73/km^{2} (159.9/sq mi)
- Time zone: UTC+09:00 (JST)
- Symbols
- Bird: Common house martin
- Flower: Chrysanthemum
- Tree: Hiba

Kodomari (小泊村, Kodomari-mura) was a village located in Kitatsugaru District in western Aomori Prefecture, Japan.

Kodomari was located in the far northwest corner of Tsugaru Peninsula facing the Sea of Japan and Tsugaru Strait. The area was part of Hirosaki Domain during the Edo period. After the Meiji Restoration, Kodomari Village was created on April 1, 1889.

On March 28, 2005, Kodomari, along with the neighboring town of Nakasato (also from Kitatsugaru District), was merged to create the town of Nakadomari, and thus no longer exists as an independent municipality.

At the time of its merger, Kodomari had an estimated population of 3,989 and a population density of 61.73 persons per km^{2}. The total area was 64.62 km^{2}.

The village economy was dominated by agriculture and forestry.
