= Goshogawara =

Goshogawara 五所川原市
- City
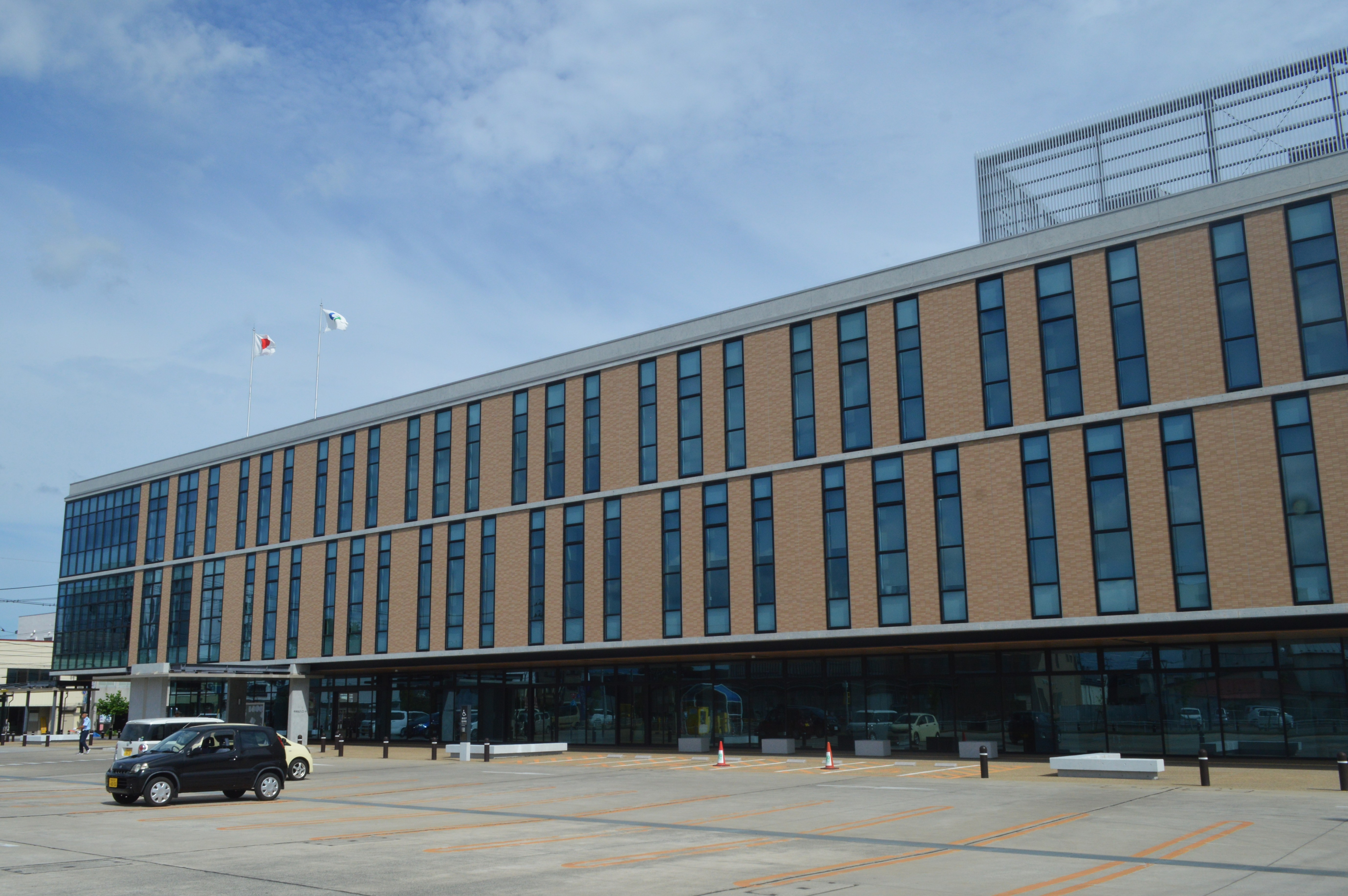
- Goshogawara City Hall

- Flag Seal
- Interactive map of Goshogawara
- Coordinates: 40°48′28.9″N 140°26′24.3″E
- Country: Japan
- Region: Tōhoku
- Prefecture: Aomori
- Town settled: July 1, 1898
- City settled: October 1, 1954

Government
  - Mayor: Takamasa Sasaki(佐々木孝昌) - from June 2018

Area
  - Total: 404.20 km^{2} (156.06 sq mi)

Population (January 31, 2023)
  - Total: 51,578
  - Density: 127.61/km^{2} (330.50/sq mi)
- Time zone: UTC+9 (Japan Standard Time)
- Phone number: 0173-35-2111
- Address: 12 Iwakichō, Goshogawara-shi, Aomori-ken 037-8686
- Climate: Cfa/Dfa
- Website: Official website
- Symbols
- Bird: Oriental greenfinch
- Flower: Nohanashōbu (iris ensata var. spontanea)
- Tree: Japanese elm

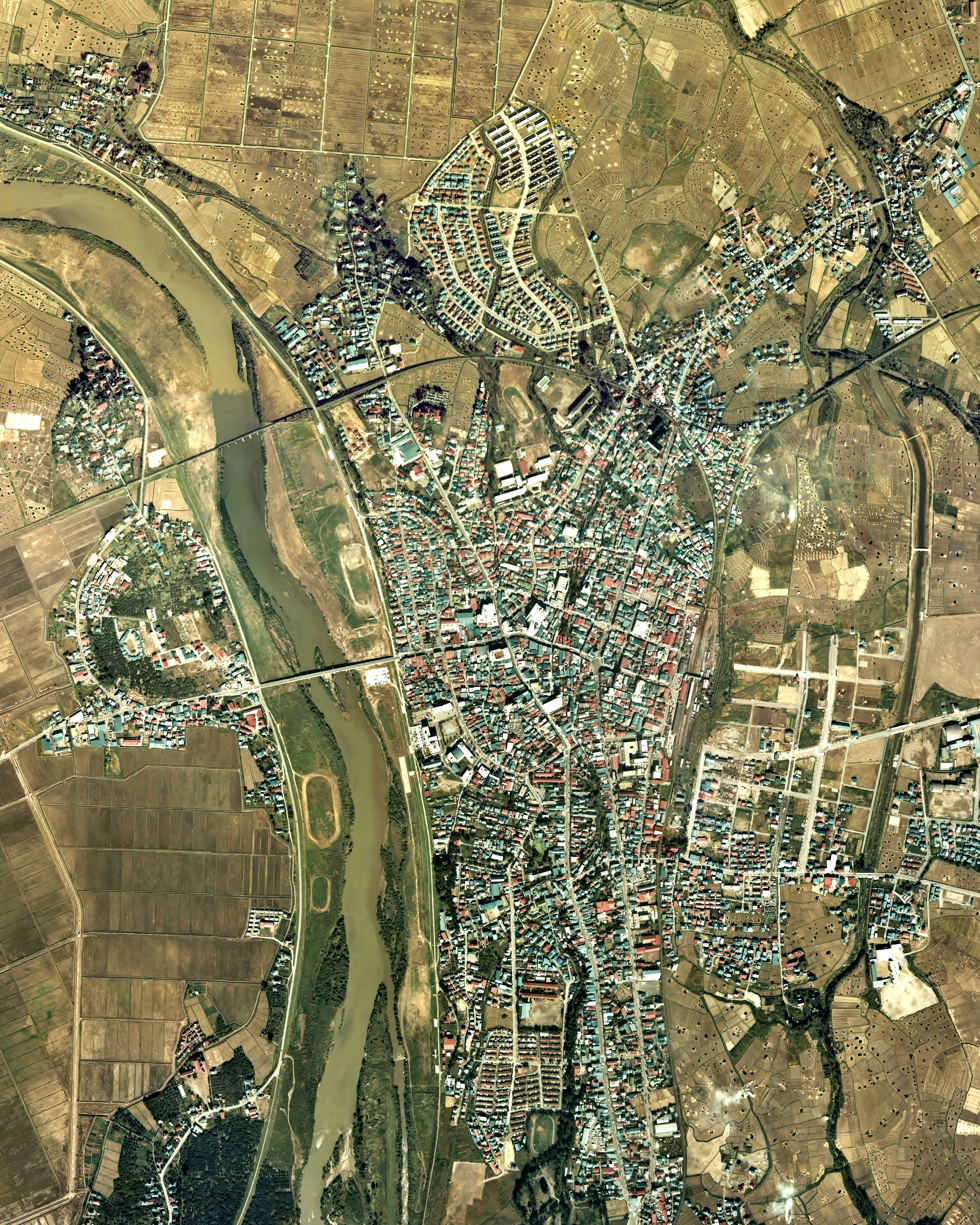
Aerial View of Goshogawara city center

Goshogawara (五所川原市, Goshogawara-shi) is a city located in Aomori Prefecture, Japan. As of 31 January 2023, the city had an estimated population of 51,578 in 25,615 households, and a population density of 130 persons per km^{2}. The total area of the city is 404.18 square kilometres (156.05 sq mi).

== Geography ==
Goshogawara occupies two discontinuous areas on Tsugaru Peninsula in western Aomori Prefecture. The Iwaki River flows through the city. The larger section is landlocked, and is in the middle of the peninsula. It contains the original town of Goshogawara, and is the population centre of the city. The smaller exclave to the north is on the Sea of Japan coast. Parts of the city are within the borders of the Tsugaru Quasi-National Park.

=== Neighbouring municipalities ===
Aomori Prefecture

- Aomori
- Imabetsu
- Itayanagi
- Nakadomari
- Sotogahama
- Tsugaru
- Tsuruta
- Yomogita

== Climate ==
The city has a humid continental climate (Köppen Dfa) characterized by warm short summers and long cold winters with heavy snowfall. The average annual temperature in Goshogawara is 10.6 °C. The average annual rainfall is 1281 mm with September as the wettest month. The temperatures are highest on average in August, at around 23.4 °C, and lowest in January, at around -1.5 °C.

Climate data for Goshogawara (elevation 9 m, 1991–2020 normals, extremes 1976–present)
Month	Jan	Feb	Mar	Apr	May	Jun	Jul	Aug	Sep	Oct	Nov	Dec	Year
Record high °C (°F)	10.1 (50.2)	18.4 (65.1)	21.9 (71.4)	29.0 (84.2)	33.5 (92.3)	34.2 (93.6)	36.4 (97.5)	39.0 (102.2)	36.2 (97.2)	28.9 (84.0)	24.8 (76.6)	17.5 (63.5)	39.0 (102.2)
Mean daily maximum °C (°F)	1.7 (35.1)	2.6 (36.7)	6.6 (43.9)	13.8 (56.8)	19.4 (66.9)	22.8 (73.0)	26.5 (79.7)	28.2 (82.8)	24.6 (76.3)	18.2 (64.8)	11.0 (51.8)	4.4 (39.9)	15.0 (59.0)
Daily mean °C (°F)	−1.1 (30.0)	−0.7 (30.7)	2.5 (36.5)	8.5 (47.3)	14.1 (57.4)	18.0 (64.4)	22.0 (71.6)	23.4 (74.1)	19.5 (67.1)	13.1 (55.6)	6.9 (44.4)	1.3 (34.3)	10.6 (51.1)
Mean daily minimum °C (°F)	−4.2 (24.4)	−4.2 (24.4)	−1.5 (29.3)	3.5 (38.3)	9.4 (48.9)	14.1 (57.4)	18.4 (65.1)	19.6 (67.3)	15.0 (59.0)	8.5 (47.3)	3.0 (37.4)	−1.7 (28.9)	6.7 (44.1)
Record low °C (°F)	−14.3 (6.3)	−15.8 (3.6)	−12.4 (9.7)	−5.0 (23.0)	0.4 (32.7)	4.8 (40.6)	9.9 (49.8)	10.7 (51.3)	4.9 (40.8)	0.0 (32.0)	−8.8 (16.2)	−13.7 (7.3)	−15.8 (3.6)
Average precipitation mm (inches)	120.7 (4.75)	81.9 (3.22)	64.1 (2.52)	62.6 (2.46)	69.2 (2.72)	74.9 (2.95)	113.3 (4.46)	139.2 (5.48)	133.9 (5.27)	131.3 (5.17)	147.8 (5.82)	141.5 (5.57)	1,280.4 (50.41)
Average snowfall cm (inches)	186 (73)	143 (56)	80 (31)	3 (1.2)	0 (0)	0 (0)	0 (0)	0 (0)	0 (0)	0 (0)	19 (7.5)	122 (48)	543 (214)
Average precipitation days (≥ 1.0 mm)	22.8	18.5	14.9	11.0	9.7	8.6	9.7	10.1	11.7	14.7	18.4	22.7	172.7
Mean monthly sunshine hours	22.7	49.4	115.7	179.6	202.4	181.2	160.5	184.7	160.2	134.2	74.7	32.0	1,497.4
Source: Japan Meteorological Agency (1991–2020 normals, extremes 1976–present)

Climate data for Shiura, Goshogawara (elevation 20 m, 1991–2020 normals, extremes 1976–present)
Month	Jan	Feb	Mar	Apr	May	Jun	Jul	Aug	Sep	Oct	Nov	Dec	Year
Record high °C (°F)	11.9 (53.4)	18.0 (64.4)	21.8 (71.2)	25.9 (78.6)	28.6 (83.5)	31.1 (88.0)	35.4 (95.7)	37.2 (99.0)	33.6 (92.5)	26.3 (79.3)	22.3 (72.1)	15.9 (60.6)	37.2 (99.0)
Mean daily maximum °C (°F)	2.0 (35.6)	2.7 (36.9)	6.3 (43.3)	12.0 (53.6)	17.0 (62.6)	20.8 (69.4)	24.5 (76.1)	26.6 (79.9)	23.5 (74.3)	17.5 (63.5)	10.9 (51.6)	4.6 (40.3)	14.0 (57.2)
Daily mean °C (°F)	−0.6 (30.9)	−0.2 (31.6)	2.8 (37.0)	7.8 (46.0)	12.7 (54.9)	16.7 (62.1)	20.9 (69.6)	22.7 (72.9)	19.2 (66.6)	13.2 (55.8)	7.2 (45.0)	1.8 (35.2)	10.3 (50.5)
Mean daily minimum °C (°F)	−3.4 (25.9)	−3.2 (26.2)	−0.9 (30.4)	3.4 (38.1)	8.4 (47.1)	13.1 (55.6)	17.9 (64.2)	19.4 (66.9)	15.0 (59.0)	8.6 (47.5)	3.3 (37.9)	−1.2 (29.8)	6.7 (44.1)
Record low °C (°F)	−15.0 (5.0)	−16.4 (2.5)	−13.0 (8.6)	−7.4 (18.7)	−0.8 (30.6)	4.9 (40.8)	8.1 (46.6)	9.3 (48.7)	3.5 (38.3)	−0.8 (30.6)	−7.5 (18.5)	−12.2 (10.0)	−16.4 (2.5)
Average precipitation mm (inches)	117.6 (4.63)	83.9 (3.30)	76.1 (3.00)	77.9 (3.07)	94.3 (3.71)	84.8 (3.34)	118.4 (4.66)	166.6 (6.56)	154.8 (6.09)	137.9 (5.43)	154.8 (6.09)	135.6 (5.34)	1,402.4 (55.21)
Average precipitation days (≥ 1.0 mm)	22.1	18.5	14.8	11.1	10.5	9.3	9.6	10.2	11.5	13.8	17.5	21.5	170.4
Mean monthly sunshine hours	27.6	55.5	126.1	187.2	198.5	177.6	157.6	186.4	170.3	144.9	68.6	33.9	1,527.1
Source: Japan Meteorological Agency (1991–2020 normals, extremes 1976–present)

== Demographics ==
Per Japanese census data, the population of Goshogawara has declined over the past 40 years.

Historical population
Year	Pop.	±% p.a.
1960	70,222	—
1970	67,047	−0.46%
1980	68,738	+0.25%
1990	63,843	−0.74%
2000	63,208	−0.10%
2010	58,421	−0.78%
2020	51,415	−1.27%

== History ==
The area of Goshogawara was part of the holdings of the Tsugaru clan of Hirosaki Domain in the Edo period. With the post-Meiji restoration establishment of the modern municipalities system on April 1, 1889, the area became part of Kitatsugaru District, Aomori, and was divided into the villages of Goshogawara, Sakae, Miyoshi, Nakagawa, Nagahashi, Nanawa, Matsushima and Itayanagi on April 1, 1889. On July 1, 1898, Goshogawara was elevated to town status. On October 1, 1954. Goshogawara absorbed the villages of Sakae, Nakagawa, Nagahashi, Matsushima and Iizume to create the city of Goshogawara. On April 1, 1958, Goshogawara absorbed a portion of the town of Kizukuri.

On March 28, 2005, the town of Kanagi, and the village of Shiura were merged into Goshogawara.

In March 2024, the city announced the creation of its own "Citizen's Honor Award", with the intention of making sumo wrestler Takerufuji the first recipient of the prize following his historical championship win.

== Government ==
Goshogawara has a mayor-council form of government with a directly elected mayor and a unicameral city legislature of 26 members. Goshogawara, together with the town of Nakadomari contribute three members to the Aomori Prefectural Assembly. In terms of national politics, the city is part of Aomori 3rd district of the lower house of the Diet of Japan.

== Economy ==
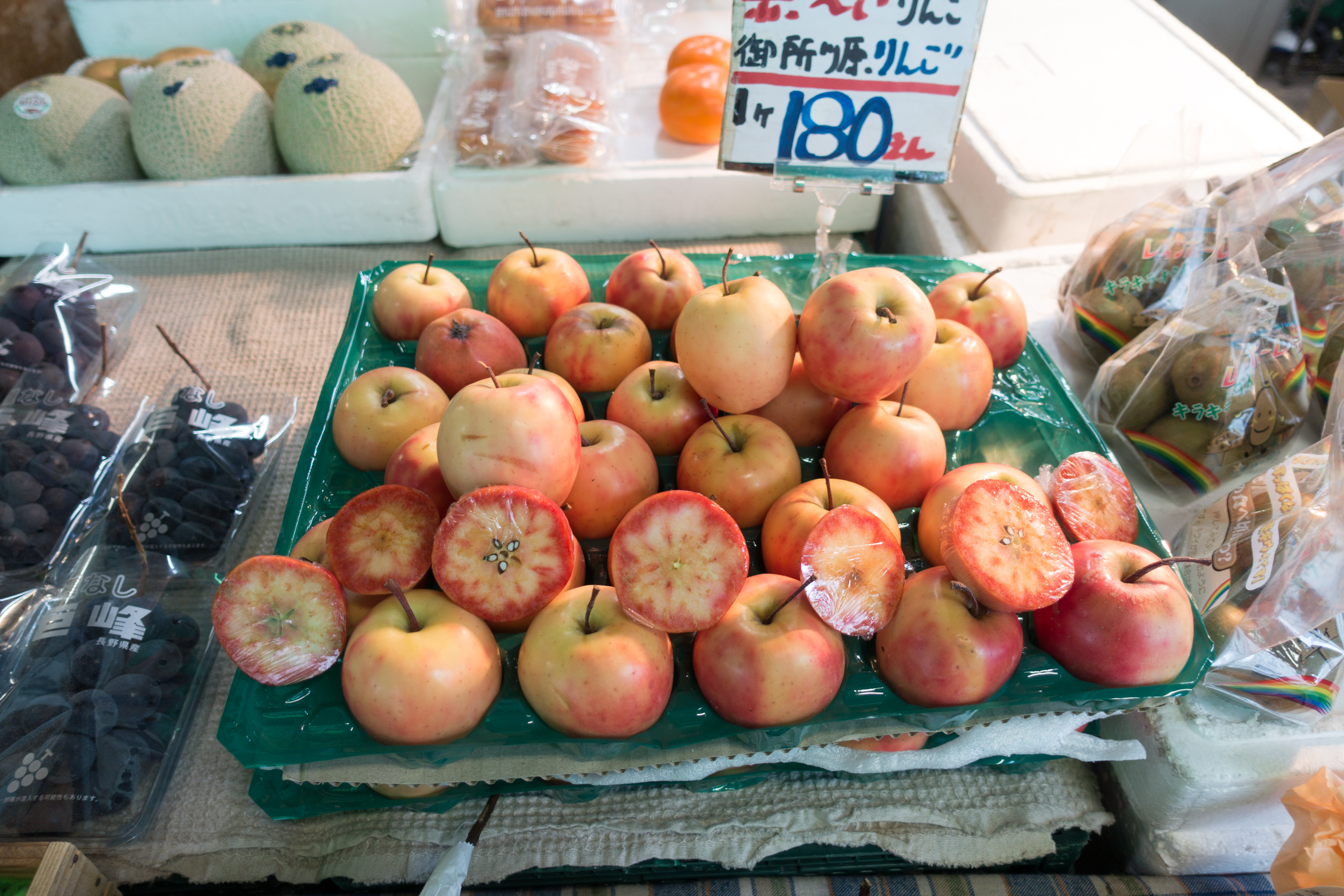
Goshogawara apples, a local cultivar

The economy of Goshogawara is mixed. The city serves as a regional commercial center. Agricultural produce includes rice and apples, and commercial fishing includes clams. The Aomori Technopolis High-Tech Industrial Park is located in the city.

== Education ==
Goshogawara has 11 public elementary schools and six public junior high schools operated by the city government. The city has five public high schools operated by the Aomori prefectural Board of Education. The city also has two private high schools.

=== High schools ===
Prefectural

- Goshogawara Agriculture and Forestry High School
- Goshogawara High School
- Goshogawara Technical High School
- Kanagi High School

Private

- Goshogawara Commercial High School
- Goshogawara Daiichi High School

== Transportation ==
=== Railway ===
East Japan Railway Company (JR East) - Gonō Line

- Goshogawara

Tsugaru Railway

- Goshogawara - Togawa - Gonōkōmae - Tsugaru-Iizume - Bishamon - Kase - Kanagi - Ashino-Kōen - Kawakura

=== Highway ===
- Tsugaru Expressway
- National Route 101
- National Route 339

=== Air ===
The nearest airport is Aomori Airport, located 28 km (17 mi) south east. The airport primarily serves domestic flights and international flights to South Korea and Taiwan.

== Local attractions ==
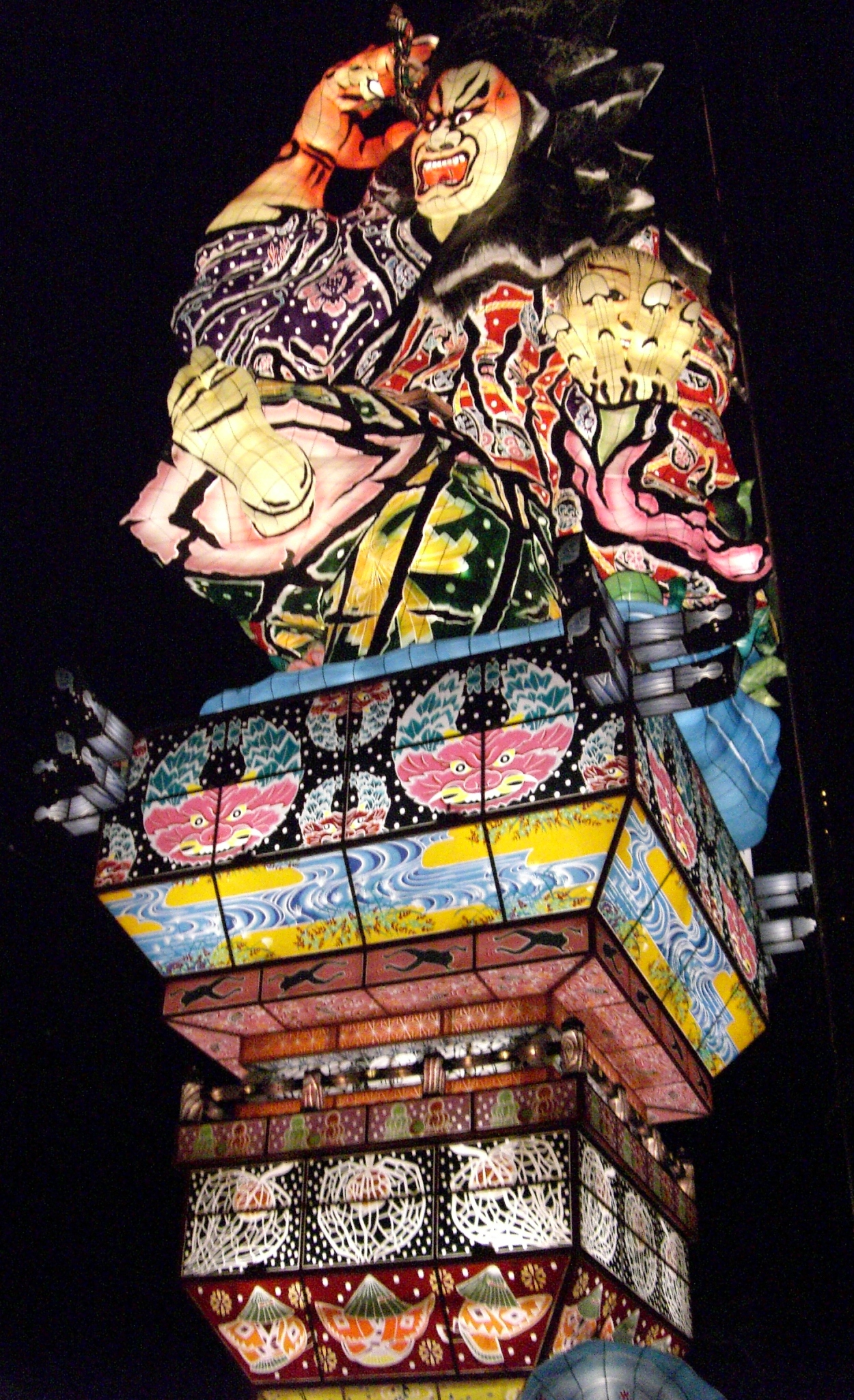
Goshogawara Tachineputa

- Ashino Chishōgun Prefectural Natural Park
- Osamu Dazai Memorial Museum
- Goshogawara Sue Pottery Kiln Site, a National Historic Site
- Lake Jūsan
- Sannobō Site, a National Historic Site
- Tachineputa Museum - Goshogawara is famous for its Tachineputa Festival, held annually from August 4 to August 8. The tachineputa floats are much taller than their counterparts in Aomori and Hirosaki, reaching heights of up to 23 meters.
- Tosaminato ruins, a National Historic Site

== Noted people from Goshogawara ==
- Osamu Dazai, novelist
- Kōji Hirayama, politician
- Takerufuji Mikiya, sumo wrestler
- Shimizugawa Motokichi, sumo wrestler
- Kashiwado Risuke, sumo wrestler
- Wakako Sawara, dentist and politician
- Daichi Shimoyama, basketball player
- Bunji Tsushima, politician
- Ikuzo Yoshi, Enka singer-songwriter
