= Shiura, Aomori =

Shiura 市浦村
- Former municipality
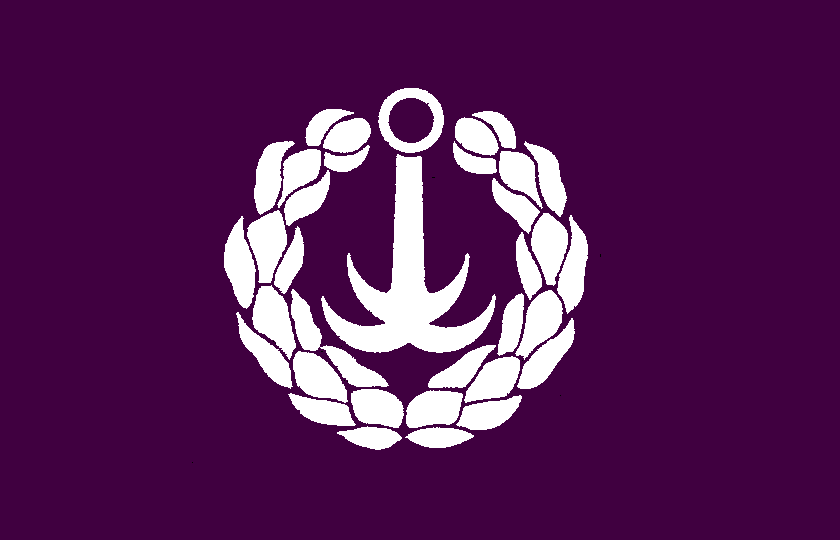
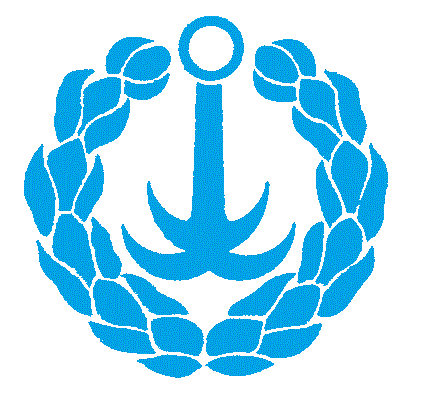
- Flag Seal

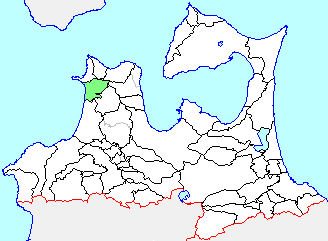
- Location of Shiura in Aomori Prefecture

- Location in Japan
- Coordinates: 41°3′18″N 140°20′43.9″E
- Country: Japan
- Region: Tōhoku
- Prefecture: Aomori Prefecture
- District: Kitatsugaru
- Merged: March 28, 2005 (now part of Goshogawara)

Area
  - Total: 111.75 km^{2} (43.15 sq mi)

Population (March 1, 2005)
  - Total: 2,708
  - Density: 24.23/km^{2} (62.8/sq mi)
- Time zone: UTC+09:00 (JST)
- Climate: Cfa
- Symbols
- Bird: Black kite
- Flower: Oenothera
- Tree: Hiba

Shiura (市浦村, Shiura-mura) was a village located in Kitatsugaru District in western Aomori Prefecture, Japan.

== Geography ==
Shiura was located in northwest corner of Tsugaru Peninsula facing the Sea of Japan. The area was part of Hirosaki Domain during the Edo period.

== History ==
After the Meiji Restoration, Shiura Village was created on March 31, 1955 through the merger of Aiuchi, Jusan and Wakimoto villages.

On March 28, 2005, Shiura, along with the neighboring town of Kanagi (also from Kitatsugaru District), was merged into the expanded city of Goshogawara, and thus no longer exists as an independent municipality.

== Population ==
At the time of its merger, Shiura had an estimated population of 2,708 and a population density of 24.23 persons per km^{2}. The total area was 111.75 km^{2}.

== Economy ==
The village economy was dominated by commercial fishing and agriculture. The village was on Route 339 (Japan) highway.

== Climate ==
Climate data for Shiura, Aomori (1991−2020 normals, extremes 1976−present)
Month	Jan	Feb	Mar	Apr	May	Jun	Jul	Aug	Sep	Oct	Nov	Dec	Year
Record high °C (°F)	11.2 (52.2)	16.9 (62.4)	17.6 (63.7)	24.9 (76.8)	28.6 (83.5)	31.1 (88.0)	35.4 (95.7)	36.3 (97.3)	33.6 (92.5)	26.3 (79.3)	22.2 (72.0)	15.9 (60.6)	36.3 (97.3)
Mean daily maximum °C (°F)	2.0 (35.6)	2.7 (36.9)	6.3 (43.3)	12.0 (53.6)	17.0 (62.6)	20.8 (69.4)	24.5 (76.1)	26.6 (79.9)	23.5 (74.3)	17.5 (63.5)	10.9 (51.6)	4.6 (40.3)	14.0 (57.3)
Daily mean °C (°F)	−0.6 (30.9)	−0.2 (31.6)	2.8 (37.0)	7.8 (46.0)	12.7 (54.9)	16.7 (62.1)	20.9 (69.6)	22.7 (72.9)	19.2 (66.6)	13.2 (55.8)	7.2 (45.0)	1.8 (35.2)	10.4 (50.6)
Mean daily minimum °C (°F)	−3.4 (25.9)	−3.2 (26.2)	−0.9 (30.4)	3.4 (38.1)	8.4 (47.1)	13.1 (55.6)	17.9 (64.2)	19.4 (66.9)	15.0 (59.0)	8.6 (47.5)	3.3 (37.9)	−1.2 (29.8)	6.7 (44.0)
Record low °C (°F)	−15.0 (5.0)	−16.4 (2.5)	−13.0 (8.6)	−7.4 (18.7)	−0.8 (30.6)	4.9 (40.8)	8.1 (46.6)	9.3 (48.7)	3.5 (38.3)	−0.5 (31.1)	−7.5 (18.5)	−12.2 (10.0)	−16.4 (2.5)
Average precipitation mm (inches)	117.6 (4.63)	83.9 (3.30)	76.1 (3.00)	77.9 (3.07)	94.3 (3.71)	84.8 (3.34)	118.4 (4.66)	166.6 (6.56)	154.8 (6.09)	137.9 (5.43)	154.8 (6.09)	135.6 (5.34)	1,402.4 (55.21)
Average precipitation days (≥ 1.0 mm)	22.1	18.5	14.8	11.1	10.5	9.3	9.6	10.2	11.5	13.8	17.5	21.5	170.4
Mean monthly sunshine hours	27.6	55.5	126.1	187.2	198.5	177.6	157.6	186.4	170.3	144.9	68.6	33.9	1,527.1
Source: Japan Meteorological Agency
