= Kitatsugaru District, Aomori =

District in Aomori prefecture, Japan

Coordinates: 40.984°N 140.45°E

- Japan > Tōhoku region > Aomori Prefecture > Kitatsugaru District

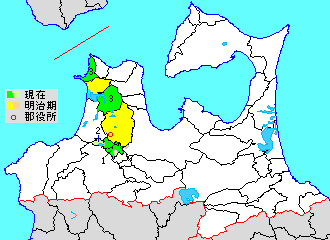
Map showing original extent of Kitatsugaru District in Aomori Prefecture green - current green/yellow - former extent in early Meiji period: 1. - Itayanagi; 2. – Tsuruta; 3. - Nakadomari; 4. – Sotogahama

Kitatsugaru District (北津軽郡, Kitatsugaru-gun) is a rural district located in Aomori Prefecture, Japan.

As of September 2013, the district had an estimated population of 40,171 and an area of 304.54 km^{2}. Much the city of Goshogawara and part of the city of Aomori was formerly part of Kitatsugaru District. In terms of national politics, the district is represented in the Diet of Japan's House of Representatives as a part of the Aomori 3rd district.

== Towns and villages ==
- Itayanagi
- Nakadomari
- Tsuruta

== History ==
The area of Kitatsugaru District was formerly part of Mutsu Province. At the time of the Meiji restoration of 1868, the area consisted of 159 villages, all under the control of Hirosaki Domain. Aomori Prefecture was founded on December 13, 1871, and Kitatsugaru District was carved out for former Tsugaru District on October 30, 1878.

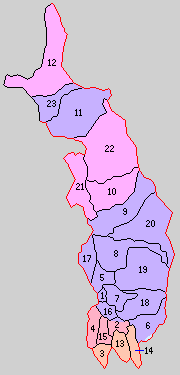
Historic Map of Kitatsugaru District: 1.Goshogawara 2.Umezawa 3.Itayanagi 4.Tsuruta 5.Nakagawa 6.Nanawa 7.Matsushima 8.Kase 9.Kanagi 10.Nakasato 11.Aiuchi 12. Kodomari 13.Koami 14.Soikawa 15.Rokugo 16.Sakai 17.Miyoshi 18.Nagahashi 19.Iizumi 20.Kiraichi 21.Takeda 22.Uchigata 23.Wakimoto Purple= Goshogawara City, Orange=Itayanagi, Red= Nakadomari, Peach=Tsuruta

With the establishment of the municipality system on April 1, 1889, Kitatsugaru District, organized into 23 villages, was established.

- 1898 - Goshogawara was elevated to city status.
- 1920 – Kanagi and Itayanagi were elevated to town status.
- 1941 – Nakasato and Tsuruta were elevated to town status
- On March 28, 2005 the town of Kanagi and the village of Shiura merged into the city of Goshogawara.
- On March 28, 2005 the town of Nakasato and the village of Kodomari merged to form the new town of Nakadomari.
