= Lake Jūsan =

Lake in Japan

- Jūsangata 十三潟 (Tsugaru dialect)
- 十三湖 (Japanese)
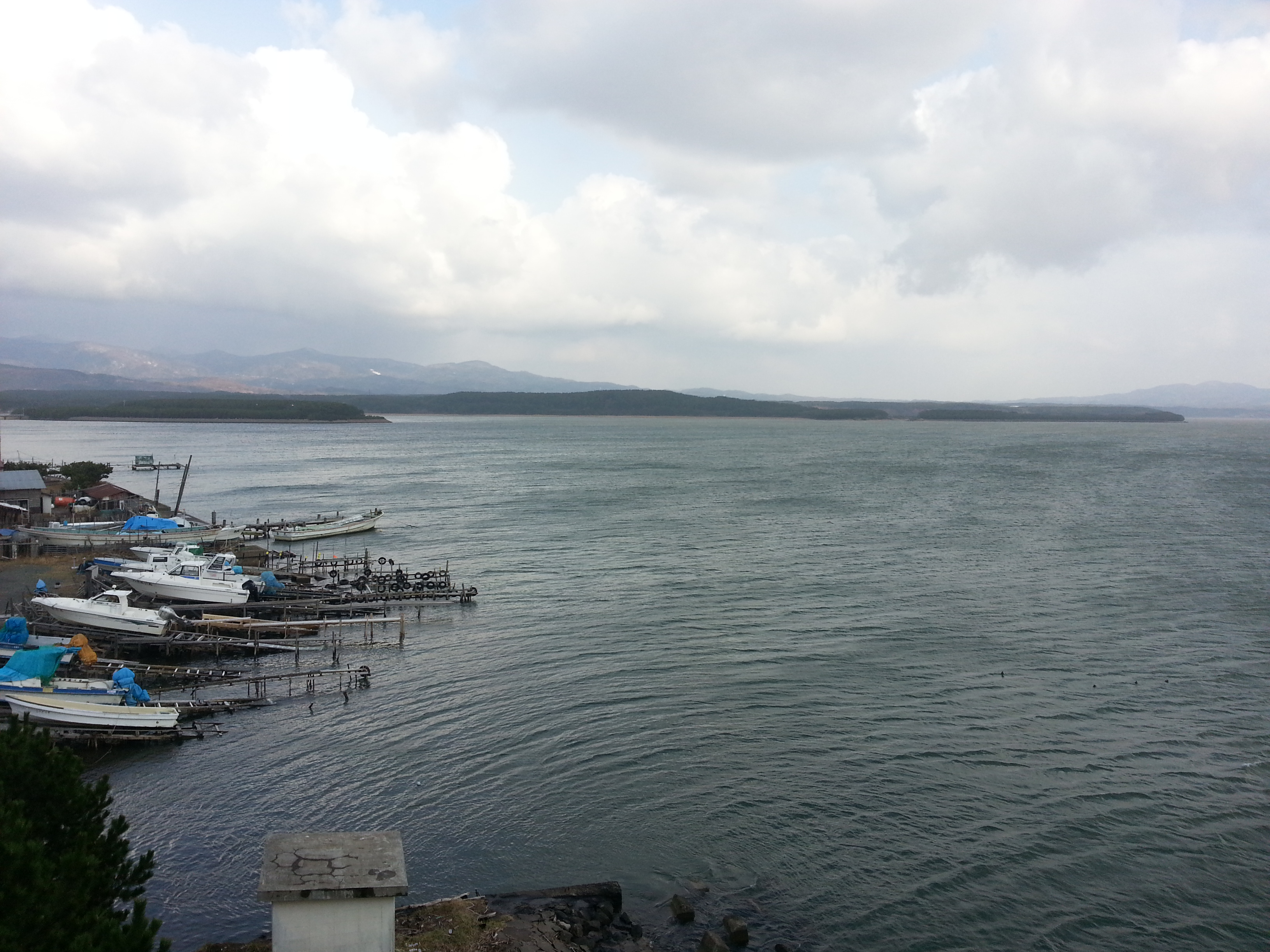
- View of Lake Jūsan.

- Location within Aomori Prefecture
- Location: Goshogawara, Aomori
- Coordinates: 41°1′57″N 140°20′31″E
- Type: lagoon-type estuary
- Primary inflows: Iwaki River
- Primary outflows: Sea of Japan
- Basin countries: Japan
- Max. length: 31.4 km (19.5 mi)
- Max. width: 5 km (3.1 mi)
- Surface area: 17.81 km^{2} (6.88 sq mi)
- Average depth: 1.5 m (4 ft 11 in)
- Max. depth: 3 m (9.8 ft)
- Shore length^{1}: 30 km (19 mi)
- Surface elevation: 0 m (0 ft)
- ^{1} Shore length is not a well-defined measure.

Lake Jūsan (Japanese: 十三湖, Hepburn: Jūsan-ko), also known locally as Jūsan Lagoon (Japanese: 十三潟, Hepburn: Jūsan-gata) is a brackish-water lagoon-type estuary located in the city of Goshogawara in Aomori Prefecture, Japan. It is the third-largest lake in Aomori Prefecture, after Lake Towada and Lake Ogawara, with a shoreline of 30 kilometers (19 mi) and a maximum depth of 3 meters.

== Etymology ==
Per the Goshogawara city tourist bureau, the lagoon is called Lake Jusan because thirteen (十三, jūsan) different rivers flow into it. However, other sources state that the name comes from the Ainu language word "To Sam", meaning the "shoreline of a lake".

== Hydrology ==
The primary inflow to Lake Jūsan is the Iwaki River. Several small rivers also flow into the lagoon. The only outflow of the lagoon is to the Sea of Japan at the northwest corner of the lake, opposite to the mouth of the Iwaki River.

== Geology ==
Lake Jūsan was formed after the end of a glacial period about 7,000 years ago. The retreating glaciers left behind sandy deposits that divided the estuary from the Sea of Japan. After five hundred years a 18-meter-deep (59 ft) lake had formed. However, the lake would be filled in by sediments deposited by the Iwaki River, causing it to become more shallow and brackish.

== History ==
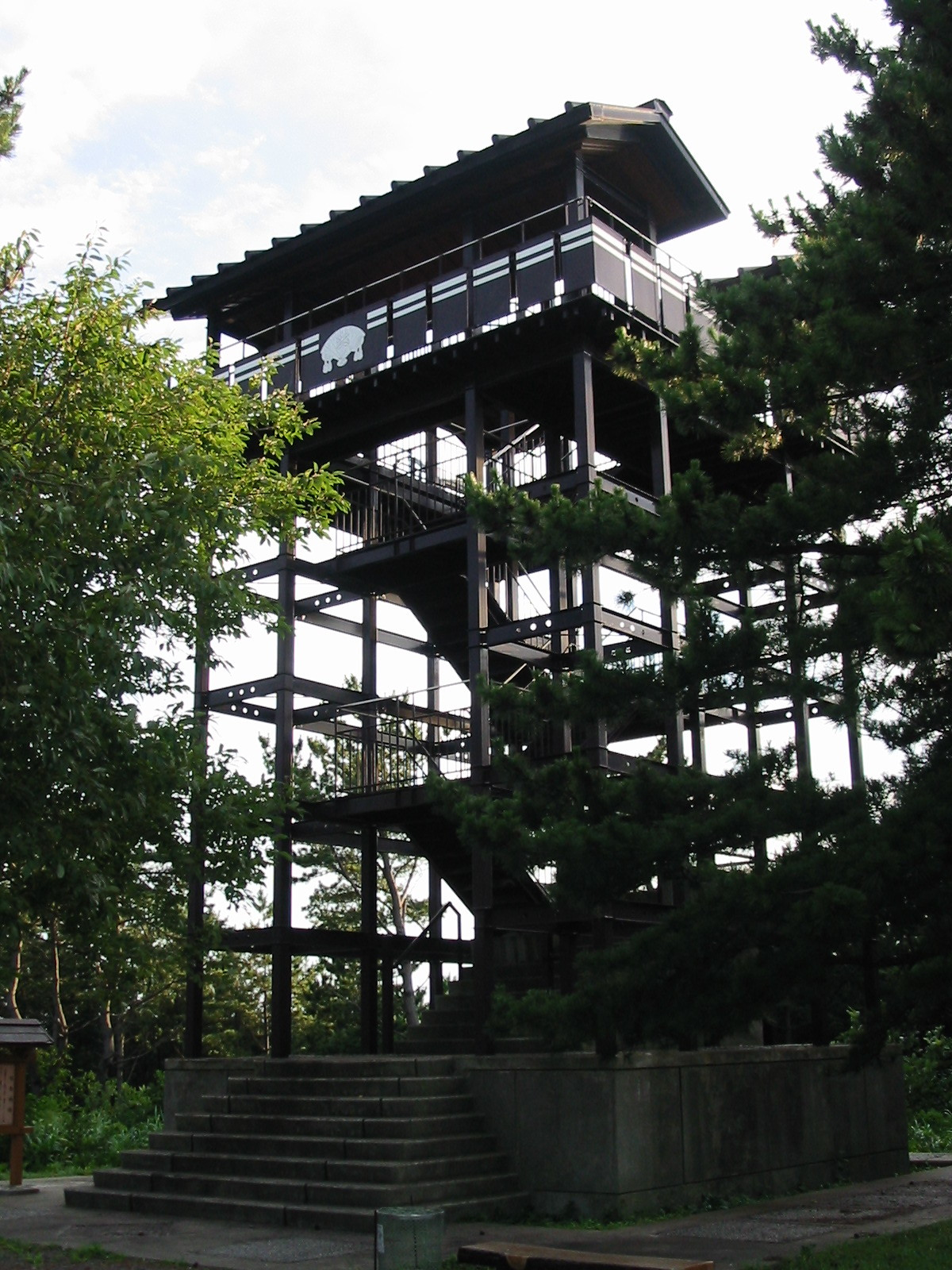
A partially-rebuilt Fukushima Castle stands on the northern shore of the estuary.

The primary source of the lagoon, the Iwaki River, supported numerous villages as early as the Jōmon period (14,000 – 300 BCE) as evidenced by numerous shell mounds. The river was revered as the "mother of the Tsugaru Plain" throughout its early history. The Iwaki River region, located in the vast northern Mutsu Province, did not come under the control of the central government until the late Heian period (794 – 1185) The Northern Fujiwara clan, based in Hiraizumi in present-day Iwate Prefecture, controlled the trade with the Asian continent and Hokkaido via the Port of Tosa, located on the western shore of the lake. Despite the loss of control of much of Japan later in the Heian period, the court maintained some level of military presence in Mutsu. This control ended when the Northern Fujiwara were conquered by Minamoto no Yoritomo (1147 – 1199) and clans of the Kantō region, and the Iwaki River region came under the direct control of the Kamakura shogunate. By the mid-Kamakura period the Andō clan ruled the area, and Fukushima Castle was built on the north shore of the lake. The Andō controlled trade with the Ainu via Tosaminato. Some records indicate that Port Tosa was destroyed in an enormous tsunami in 1340; however, historical records for this period are scarce and lack veracity. What is more certain is that the Andō were defeated by the Nanbu clan in 1442, and the port fell rapidly into disuse after that date.

During the Edo period, the port was rebuilt as the point where rice harvested in the Hirosaki Domain was exported to the Osaka, but it never regained its former prosperity and fell into disrepair again after the proliferation of railroads during the Meiji period. The ruins of Port Tosa are preserved today as a National Historic Site. The Sand Dunes of Tosa (十三の砂山まつり, Tosa no Sunayama Matsuri) folk song and dance pays tribute to the lagoon and the port.

Economically, Lake Jūsan is noted today for its production of shijimi clams.
